= Black Ribbon Movement Myanmar =

Movement against military appointments in Myanmar

Black Ribbon Movement Myanmar 2015
- The banner of Black Ribbon Movement Myanmar 2015
- Date: August – September 2015
- Location: Online plus physical protests in various locals
- Caused by: appointment of military officers to positions within Ministry of Health
- Goals: to issue an official declaration from MOH to halt the further appointment of military staff; to withdraw the recently appointed military officers from MOH
- Methods: Website banners and various actions
- Motto: Say no to militarisation of Myanmar Ministry of Health. Black Ribbon Movement Myanmar 2015

The Black Ribbon Movement Myanmar was a movement of medical professions and medical students against the appointment of military officers to positions within Ministry of Health in Myanmar (Burma) in August 2015.

== Background ==
Successive Burmese governments since the military took over in the 60s have transferred retired military officers into management positions in various civilian departments and army appointees across various sectors have often stifled the progress of experienced civilian staff.

Pe Thet Khin, a paediatrician and Minister for Health, was forced into retirement on 29 July 2014, and was replaced by Than Aung, a former military doctor. On reform, the department of health under Ministry of Health was split into two departments; department of public health and department of medical services, and as a result, about 330 new vacancies appeared. There had been widespread speculation within the Ministry that the minister planned to appoint 350 military officers.

On 28 and 30 July, the Ministry of Health announced that 14 officers from the Ministry of Defence would be transferred to the department. Five of the appointment notices were leaked online in early October. According to the appointments, not only military doctors but also other military officers graduated from the Defence Services Academy were appointed to senior positions. These military officers will become assistant and deputy directors of Ministry of Health. As of 2015, more than 100 ex-military officers are serving in various positions within the Ministry appointed before reforms in Myanmar.

== Protests ==
As for DSMA, it is an academy, they (military medical students) get the salaries, their life as a public servant starts. As for universities of medicine, they (medical students) are students; when they pass the exam (when they graduate), they apply for job, and they get the job. So, the length of service becomes different. When a medical student's service is one year, a person from his side (Minister) will be 7 or 8 years.

— Saw Win, a paediatrician

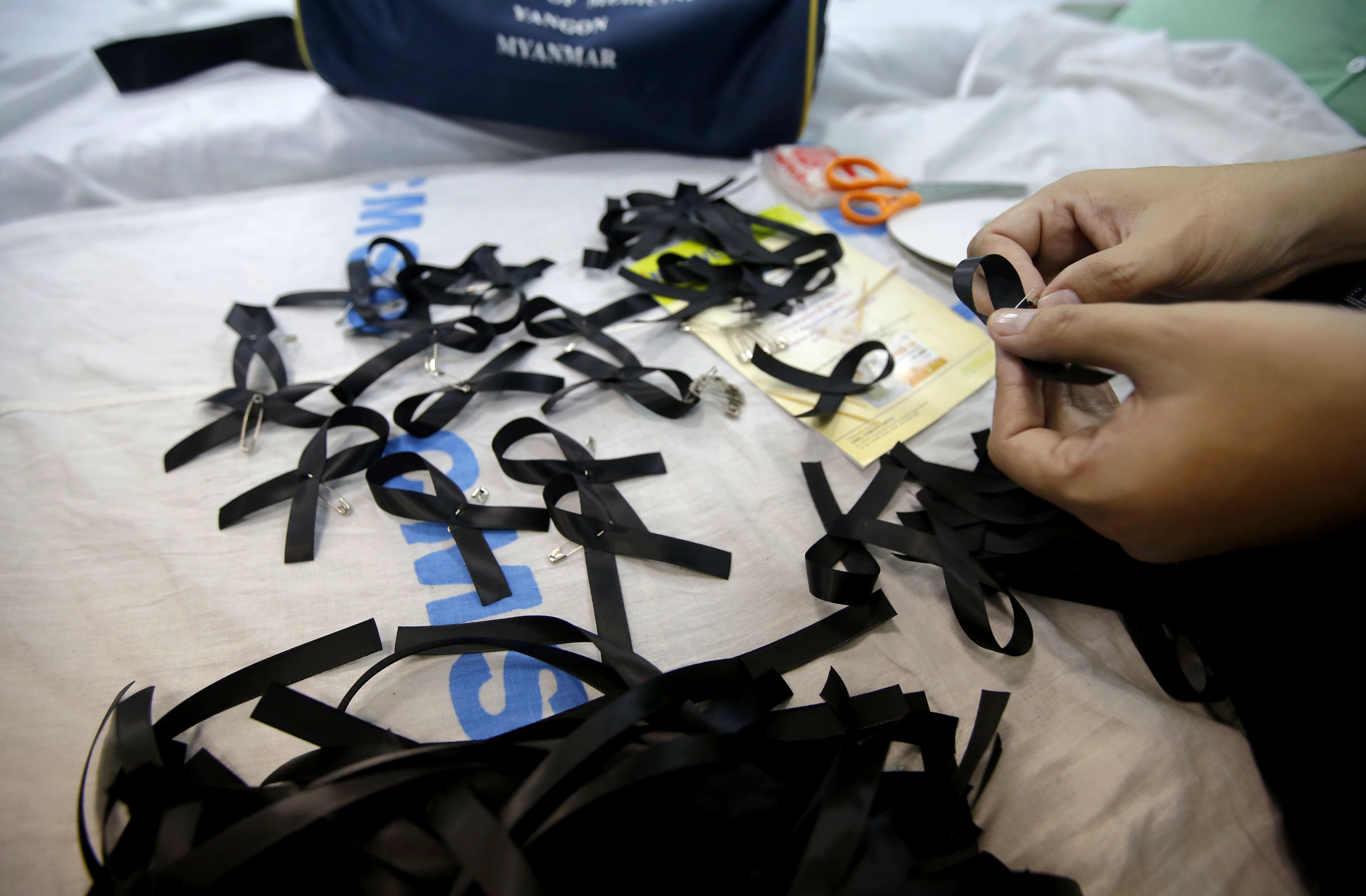
Black ribbons ready to be worn at Yangon General Hospital

On 10 August, doctors from Mandalay Orthopaedic Hospital and Taungoo Hospital created a Facebook page named Black Ribbon Movement Myanmar 2015. The page reached 40000 likes within three days after creation. The campaign encouraged anyone, including medical professionals, to make a black ribbon, take a photo of themselves wearing it on their chest, and then share the image on Facebook. People who lead the campaign welcomed the military veterans to participate in the campaign announcing that this movement did not mean to fight graduates from Defence Services Academy, and was just to oppose the dictatorial decisions.

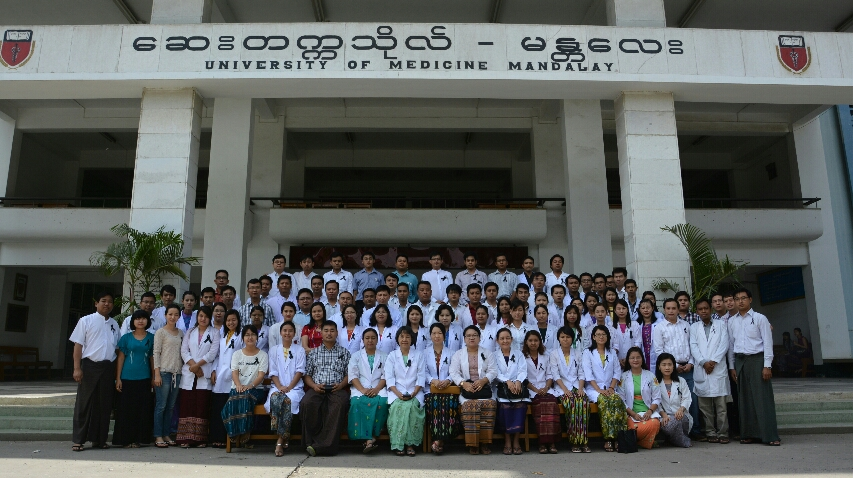

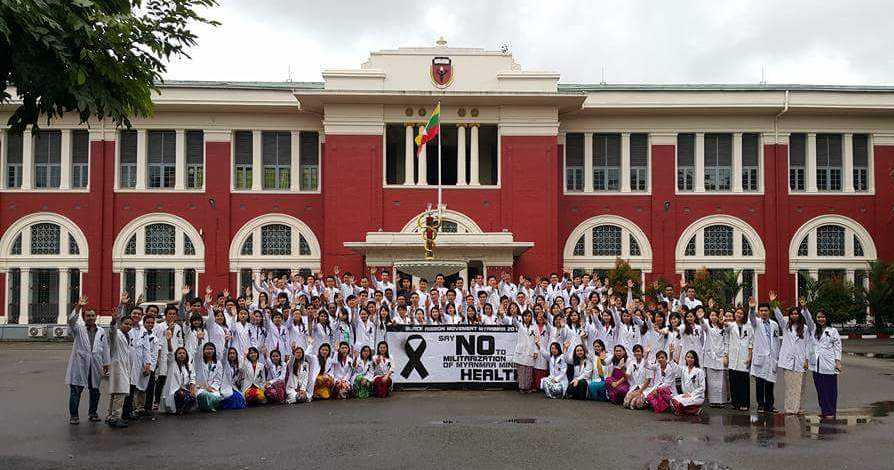
Doctors graduated from University of Medicine, Mandalay (up) and University of Medicine 1, Yangon wearing black ribbons at a protest

Well-known doctors like Ye Myint Kyaw, head of department of paediatrics, and Nyunt Thein, emeritus professor of University of Medicine 1, Yangon supported the campaign. Hundreds of doctors, nurses and other medical staff from various hospitals across the country rallied against the appointment donning black ribbons in photos posted online and adopting the catch cry, Say no to militarisation of Myanmar Ministry of Health.

Petitions against the transfers of military officers were also collected in many hospitals, and in Yangon, and Mandalay. Union of Karenni State Youth and Kayan New Land Party declared that they supported the campaign.

== Governmental response ==
On 11 August, following the public backlash, Minister for Health conveyed a verbal message to the Myanmar Medical Association pledging that the Ministry would halt the further appointment of military staff. On 12 August, the Movement called on the Ministry to issue an official declaration and officially withdraw the recently appointed military officers. However, the Ministry refused to withdraw the military appointees or offer an official declaration.
