= Aye Maung Han =

Burmese paediatrician and professor

- အေးမောင်ဟန်

Rector of University of Medicine-1, Yangon
- In office 24 February 2007 – 2009
- Preceded by: Myo Myint
- Succeeded by: Pe Thet Khin

Personal details
- Born: British Burma
- Education: Institute of Medicine, Rangoon (M.B., B.S.)
- Occupation: Physician and professor

Aye Maung Han (Burmese: အေးမောင်ဟန်) is a Burmese paediatrician and professor, currently working as a senior consultant physician for two private hospitals in Yangon (Pun Hlaing and Shwegondaing Hospitals). He previously served as the rector (dean) of the University of Medicine-1, Yangon from 2007 to 2009. He has published over 25 scientific papers in medical journals. He graduated from the Institute of Medicine, Rangoon with a medical degree in 1973.
