= Gerard Sutton =

Gerard Sutton may refer to:

- Gerard Sutton (ophthalmologist)
- Gerard Sutton (referee)
