= Department of Public Health (Myanmar) =

Latha Township Public Health Department

The Department of Public Health (Myanmar) is part of the Ministry of Health and Sports in Myanmar. The Department has five main Units.

- Director-General's office
- Disease Control
- Public Health
- Disaster
- Admin and Finance

Each unit comprises further divisions. Each division has a Director, Deputy Director, Assistant Director, Medical Officer, Health Assistants (HA) and others.

== Units ==
=== Disease Control ===
- Malaria Control Division
- Tuberculosis (TB) Control Division
- Leprosy Control Division
- Trachoma Control Division
- HIV Control Division

=== Public health ===
- Maternal and Reproductive Health
- Child Health Division
- School Health Knowledge Promotion Division
- Health Promotion Division
- Health Education Division
- Nutrition Division
- Occupational Health Division
- Environmental Health Division

=== Disaster ===
- Central Epidemiology Unit
- Non-communicable Diseases Control
- Expanded Programme on Immunization (EPI)
- Disaster Management Division

=== Admin and Finance ===
- Administration Division
- Finance Division
- Procurement and Supply Division
- Planning Division
- Health Management Information System (HMIS)
- Inspection Division

== See also ==
- Health in Myanmar
- HIV/AIDS in Myanmar
