= Than Aung =

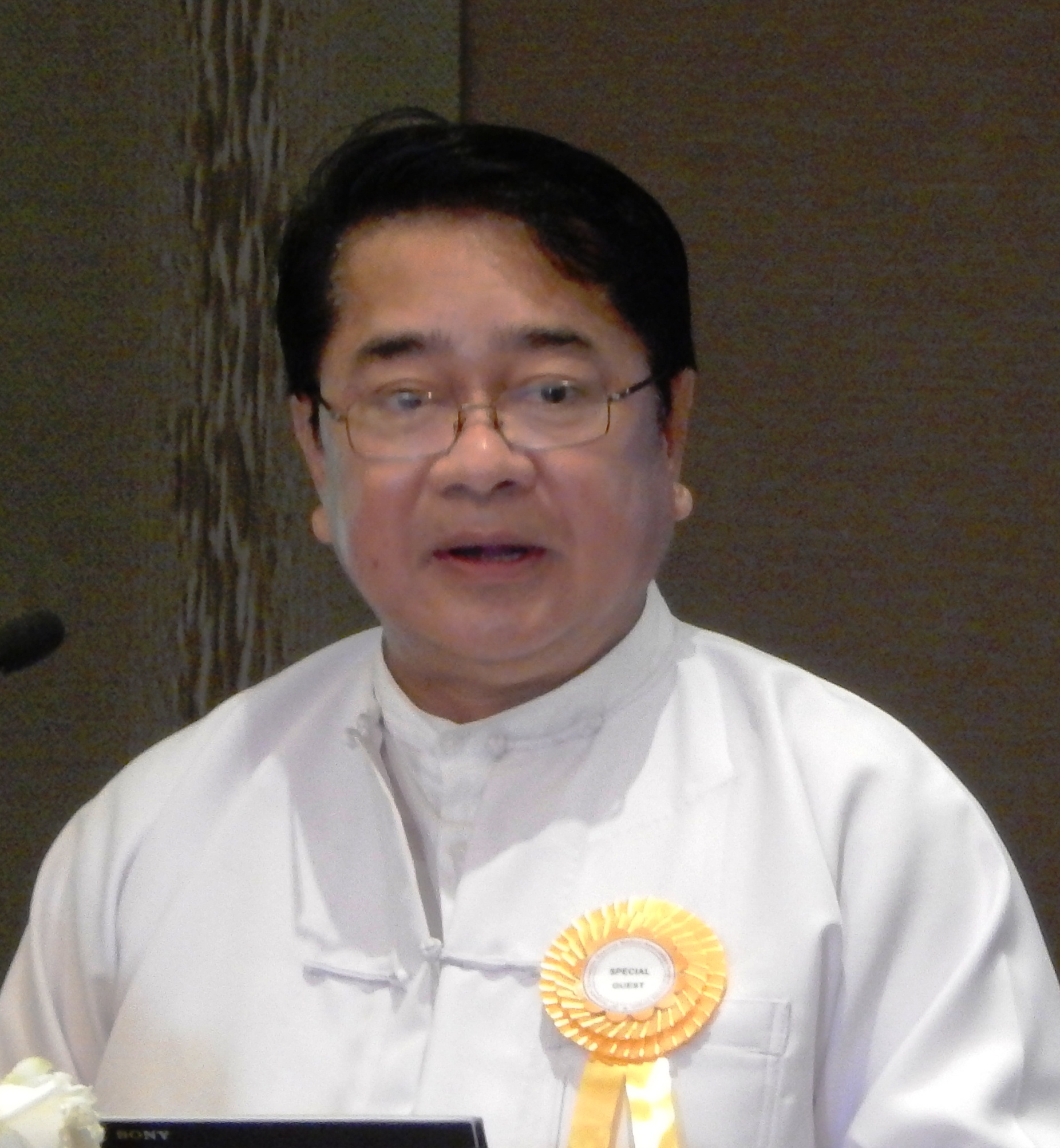
- Than Aung in 2014

Minister for Ministry of Health
- In office 1 August 2014 – 30 March 2016
- Preceded by: Pe Thet Khin
- Succeeded by: Myint Htwe

Deputy Minister of Ministry of Health
- In office 25 July 2013 – 1 August 2014
- Preceded by: Win Myint
- Succeeded by: Win Myint, Thein Thein Htay

Member of Naypyidaw Council
- In office 30 March 2011 – 25 July 2013

Director of Myanmar Army Medical Corps
- In office 2003–2011
- Preceded by: Mya Thein Han, Brig Gen
- Succeeded by: Myo Myint Thein, Maj Gen

Personal details
- Party: Union Solidarity and Development Party
- Spouse(s): Win Win Mya, Dr
- Education: Institute of Medicine 1, Rangoon
- Occupation: Army Officer

Military service
- Allegiance: Myanmar
- Branch/service: Myanmar Army Medical Corps
- Years of service: 1978 – 2011
- Rank: Brigadier general

Than Aung (Burmese: သန်းအောင်, [θáɴ àʊɴ]) is a former Minister for the Ministry of Health of Myanmar (Burma). He previously served as Deputy Minister for Ministry of Health, Member of Naypyidaw Council and director of Myanmar Army Medical Corps.

== Criticism ==
He is a former military physician and close to former military general Than Shwe. His appointment of the military officers to the Ministry of Health in August 2015 was faced with a strong opposition from medical fellows, known as Black Ribbon Movement Myanmar.
