= HIV/AIDS in Myanmar =

Human immunodeficiency virus and acquired immune deficiency syndrome in Myanmar (Formerly Burma) is recognised as a disease of concern by the Ministry of Health and is a major social and health issue in the country. In 2005, the estimated adult HIV prevalence rate in Burma was 1.3% (200,000–570,000 people), according to UNAIDS, and early indicators show that the epidemic may be waning in the country, although the epidemic continues to expand in parts of the country. Four different strains of HIV are believed to have originated from Burma, along heroin trafficking routes in northern, eastern and western Burma.

Intravenous drug users (43%), along with miners (who often become infected through drug use) and sex workers (32%), are along the most likely to be infected with HIV. At least half of the 300,000 to 500,000 drug users (according to conservative estimates) in Burma are intravenous drug users, and Burma (Shan State and Kachin State) is a major regional supplier of heroin (with a major domestic shift from opium consumption to heroin consumption occurring in the late 1980s) and methamphetamines. The most common form of heroin is a highly refined injectable product, colloquially known as "Number 4".

The national government, in 2005, spent US$137,120 (K150,831,600) on HIV, while international donors (the governments of Norway, the Netherlands, United Kingdom, and Sweden) donated US$27,711,813 towards HIV programmes in Burma. Burma (ranked 51 out of 166 countries) has one of Asia's highest adult HIV prevalence rates, following Cambodia and Thailand. An estimated 20,000 (range of 11,000 to 35,000) die from HIV/AIDS annually.

In geographic terms, the lowest rates of HIV were in the West (Rakhine and Chin State), while intermediate rates were in the central region (Ayeyarwady, Mandalay, Magway, Sagaing, Yangon and Bago Regions), and the highest infection rates were in the North (Kachin State), East (Shan and Kayin State), and South (Mon State, Tanintharyi Region).

== Government action ==
The Ministry of Health began surveying for HIV/AIDS in Burma in 1985. The first HIV case in Burma was reported in 1988, and the first AIDS patient in Burma was reported in 1991. Surveillance for HIV began the following year, and a prevention of mother-to-child transmission programme subsequently began in 2000. In 2005, antiretroviral therapy was introduced to the public sector, although only 3% of HIV/AIDS patients currently receive such treatment. Currently, AIDS is one of the priority diseases in the National Health Plan. On 18 August 2005, The Global Fund to Fight AIDS, Tuberculosis and Malaria terminated its US$98,400,000 grant (US$19,200,000 towards HIV/AIDS) in Burma after the national government imposed restrictions on travel of its staff, which contradicted earlier written agreements.

== Issues ==
According to the report named "Preventable Fate", published by Doctors without Borders (also known as Médecins Sans Frontières, 25,000 Burmese AIDS patients died in 2007, deaths that could largely have been prevented by antiretroviral therapy drugs and proper treatment. There was simply not enough money coming in from the government or from outside donors, and people are too poor to afford the treatment themselves. Médecins Sans Frontières had to restrict the number of new cases it could treat in Burma in 2008.

Pushed to its limit by the lack of treatment on offer by other care providers, Médecins Sans Frontières has recently been forced to make the painful decision to drastically reduce the number of new patients it can treat.

By 2008 Médecins Sans Frontières had become the major health provider of antiretroviral therapy and treatment in Burma, not the government or any public or private medical institution. It gave antiretroviral therapy, essential for surviving AIDS, to about 11,000 people, while over 70,000 people need the treatment. However, less than 20% of HIV/AIDS patients receive the treatment necessary.

Burma's government spends the least percentage of its GDP on health care of any country in the world, and international donor organisations give less to Burma, per capita, than any other country except India. Unsafe medical practices, like the reuse of unsterilised equipment, as well as insufficient blood screening, has also been a source of infection. Also, the relative lack of accessible health care in conflict areas along the Burmese border make it difficult for AIDS patients to seek medical help. Interruptions in supply and delivery of ART lead to drug resistance and could lead to new strains of HIV.

The criminal nature of sex work in Burma, as it is prohibited by the Suppression of Prostitution Act in 1949, also contributes to the ineffectiveness of reaching out to sex workers in Burma with regard to HIV/AIDS awareness and condom usage. In Yangon, there are over 100 brothels and up to 10,000 sex workers, with 70–90% having a history of sexually transmitted infections and less than 25% having been tested for HIV. An anecdotal study found that nearly half of sex workers in Yangon have HIV/AIDS.

== See also ==
- Prostitution in Burma
- Health in Burma
- HIV/AIDS in Asia
- AIDS pandemic
- Demographics of Burma

HIV Information for Myanmar [him] https://web.archive.org/web/20111011064958/http://him.civiblog.org/
