= Myat Myat Ohn Khin =

Burmese government minister

Agga Maha Thiri Thudhamma Theingi Thiri Pyanchi Dr Myat Myat Ohn Khin
- မြတ်မြတ်အုန်းခင်

Minister for Social Welfare, Relief and Resettlement
- In office 7 September 2012 – 30 March 2016
- Preceded by: Aung Kyi
- Succeeded by: Win Myat Aye

Deputy Minister for Health
- Preceded by: Mya Oo

Personal details
- Born: 16 October 1948 (age 77) Rangoon, Burma

Myat Myat Ohn Khin (Burmese: မြတ်မြတ်အုန်းခင်, born 1948 in Rangoon, Burma) is the former Minister for Social Welfare, Relief and Resettlement. She was sworn in on 7 September 2012, becoming the first Burmese woman in President Thein Sein's Cabinet. Myat Myat Ohn Khin was an Upper House representative and a former Deputy Minister for Health.

She was awarded the title "Agga Maha Thiri Thudhamma Theingi" in 2008. In April 2016, she was awarded the title "Thiri Pyanchi" by the President of Myanmar for her outstanding performances for the people of Myanmar.
