= Win Myat Aye =

Burmese politician

His Excellency Dr Win Myat Aye
- ဝင်းမြတ်အေး
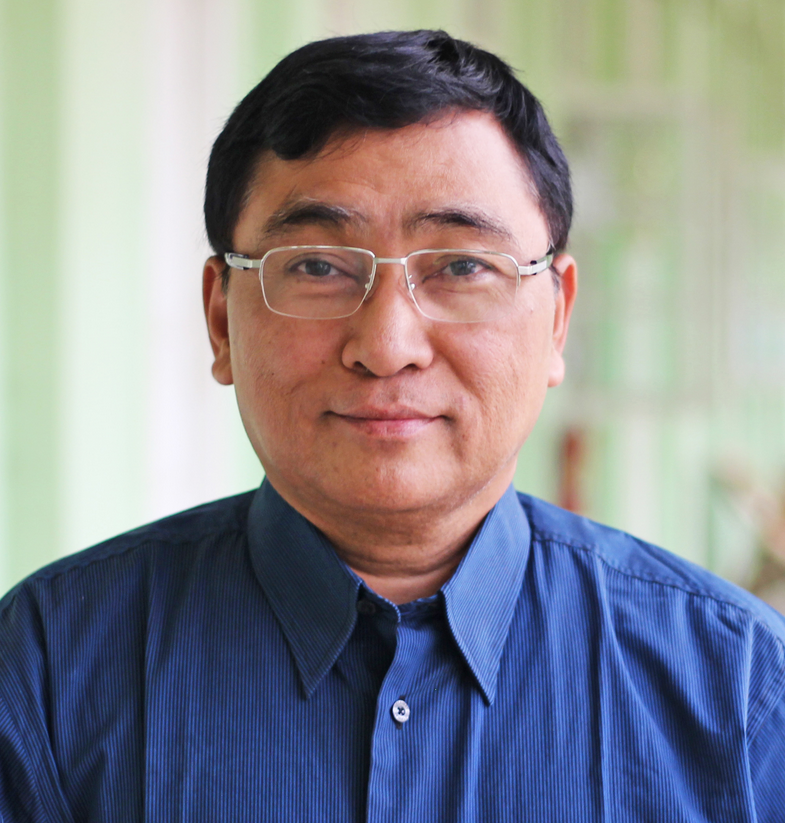
- Win Myat Aye in 2016

Minister for Social Welfare, Relief and Resettlement
- In office 30 March 2016 – 1 February 2021
- President: Htin Kyaw; Myint Swe (acting); Win Myint
- Preceded by: Myat Myat Ohn Khin
- Succeeded by: Thet Thet Khine

Amyotha Hluttaw MP
- In office 1 February 2016 – 30 March 2016
- Constituency: Bago Region № 4

Rector of University of Medicine, Magway
- In office 13 January 2011 – 30 May 2014
- Succeeded by: Aye Tun

Personal details
- Born: June 1, 1954 (age 72) Pyuntaza, Pegu Division, Burma
- Party: National League for Democracy
- Spouse: Mya Thida
- Children: 1
- Education: Institute of Medicine 1, Rangoon
- Occupation: Politician and Paediatrician

Win Myat Aye (Burmese: ဝင်းမြတ်အေး [wɪ́ɴ mjaʔ ʔé]; born 1 June 1954) is a Burmese politician and former Minister for Social Welfare, Relief and Resettlement of Myanmar (Burma). He also serves as the chairman of the Myanmar Youth Affairs Committee.

He previously served as Amyotha Hluttaw MP for Bago Region No. 4 constituency. He is a practicing paediatrician and previously served as the rector of the University of Medicine, Magway.

== Early life and education ==
Win Myat Aye was born on 1 June 1954 in Pyuntaza, Pegu Division, Burma (now Myanmar) to U Than and Daw Aye. He graduated from Institute of Medicine 1, Rangoon with medical degree in March 1980 and master's degree in pediatrics in February 1994. He got doctorate degree in pediatrics in October 2006.

== Medical and academic career ==
Win Myat Aye served as an assistant medical officer at Yangon Children's Hospital from 1988 to 1998, as an paediatrician at Waibargi Hospital from 2001 to 2004. He also served as a lecturer from 2004 to 2006 and as an associate professor from 2006 to 2007 at University of Medicine, Magway. He served as an associate professor from 2007 to 2010, and as a professor from 2010 to 2011 at University of Medicine 1, Yangon. On 13 January 2011, Win Myat Aye became the rector of University of Medicine, Magway. He retired from his post in 2014.

== Political career ==
In 2015 Myanmar general election, he was elected as an Amyotha Hluttaw MP for Bago Region No. 4 constituency.

On 22 March 2016, he was nominated to be Minister for Social Welfare, Relief and Resettlement in President Htin Kyaw's Cabinet. On 24 March, the Assembly of the Union confirmed his nomination.

During the 2021 Myanmar coup d'état on 1 February, Win Myat Aye was placed under house arrest by the Myanmar Armed Forces.

== Personal life ==
He married Mya Thida, an obstetrician and gynecologist, and has one son, Soe Lin Myat.
