= Mya Oo =

Burmese politician (born 1940)

- မြဦး

Member of the Amyotha Hluttaw
- In office 31 January 2011 – 29 January 2016
- Preceded by: None
- Succeeded by: Aye Cho
- Constituency: Bago Region № 9 (Paungde, Shwedaung and Thegon Townships)
- Majority: 110,250 (54.22%)

Deputy Minister of Health of Myanmar
- In office 16 November 1997 – 30 March 2011
- Succeeded by: Myat Myat Ohn Khin

7th Rector of University of Medicine 1, Yangon
- In office 6 June 1991 – 25 September 1996
- Preceded by: Maung Maung Sein
- Succeeded by: Kyaw Myint Tun

Personal details
- Born: 25 January 1940 (age 86) Burma
- Party: Union Solidarity and Development Party
- Spouse: Tin Tin Mya
- Children: Tun Tun Oo, Mya Thuzar, Mya Thidar, Mya Nandar
- Education: Institute of Medicine-1, Rangoon (M.B., B.S.)

Mya Oo (Burmese: မြဦး, born 25 January 1940) is a Burmese politician and physician. He was a member of the Amyotha Hluttaw, the country's upper house, representing Bago Region's Constituency No. 9 (Paungde, Shwedaung and Thegon Townships). He previously served as Deputy Minister for Health and is a former Rector of University of Medicine 1, Yangon.

Mya Oo was born on 25 January 1940. He is married to Tin Tin Mya, and has 4 children: Tun Tun Oo, Mya Thuza, Mya Thida, and Mya Nanda.
