= Food and Drug Board of Authority =

Burma federal agency

- အစာဆေးဝါးအာဏာပိုင်အဖွဲ့

Agency overview
- Type: Department
- Jurisdiction: Government of Burma
- Headquarters: Naypyidaw
- Parent agency: Ministry of Health (Burma)
- Website: www.moh.gov.mm

The Food and Drug Board of Authority (Burmese: အစားအသောက်နှင့် ဆေးဝါးကွပ်ကဲရေး ဦးစီးဌာန; abbreviated FDBA) is Myanmar's national regulatory agency, responsible for the regulation of therapeutic goods, including the manufacture, import, export, storage, distribution and sale of food and drugs, in the interests of public safety. The agency was established under the 1992 National Drug Law. According to the 1992 law, the membership is led by the Minister of Health and Deputy Minister of Health, who act as Chairman and Vice-Chairman, respectively. The FDBA is the highest authority of food and drug regulations in the country.

== See also ==
- Ministry of Health (Burma)
- Food and Drug Administration (Burma)
