= The Wachet Jivitadana Sangha Hospital =

Coordinates: 21.91516°N 96.00161°E

Wachet Jivitadana Sangha Hospital
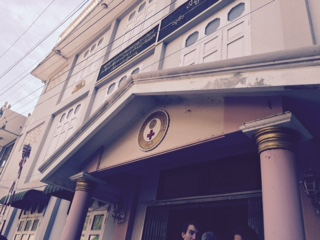

Geography
- Location: Wachet, Sagaing Hills, Sagaing, Upper Myanmar, Myanmar

Organisation
- Type: General
- Religious affiliation: Monastic
- Affiliated university: Kyaswa Gyuang Monastery

Services
- Beds: 50

History
- Founded: 20 October 1984

Links
- Lists: Hospitals in Myanmar

The Wachet Jivitadana Sangha Hospital (Burmese: ဝါးချက်ဇီဝိတဒါနသံဃာ့ဆေးရုံ) is a monastic hospital located in Wachet, Myanmar. It was founded on 20 October 1984 by Sayadaw U Lakkhana (also known as Badandha Lakkhana Sayadaw), an abbot of the Kyaswa Gyaug Monastery in Sagaing, using donations from monks, nuns, and others in the village of Wachet.

The hospital was established as a charitable institution to provide free medical treatment to monks and nuns. After 19 years, a committee of monks from Kyaswa Monastery decided to modernize the small facility. Since then, it has been significantly upgraded and expanded with local, national, and foreign aid. When first opened, it was a two-story clinic with four rooms. Today, it is a four-story, 50-bed facility that provides low-cost health services to the general public as well as to monks and nuns. The hospital provides both Western and traditional medicine, including acupuncture.

== Location ==
Wachet is a village in the Sagaing region of Upper Myanmar, along the Ayeyarwady River. The hospital is located north of the Kyaswa Monastery, east of the Sagaing Hills, and west of the Ayeyarwady River.

== Kyaswa Monastery and Sayadaw U Lakkhana ==
The Kyaswa Monastery was founded in the 14th century and is located in Wachet. Sayadaw U Lakkhana, the founder of Wachet Jivitadana Sangha Hospital, was the abbot of the monastery when the hospital was founded in 1984, and was known both in Myanmar and abroad as a meditation teacher and spiritual leader. He traveled extensively to lead Satipatthana meditation retreats, including in Australia, Malaysia, Nepal, Singapore, and the United States.

In 1988, the Myanmar government awarded him the title of Agga Maha Kammathanacarriya, its highest honor for meditation instruction. The resulting publicity helped him garner support for community projects. In addition to founding Wachet Jivitadana Sangha Hospital, Sayadaw U Lakkhana and the Kyaswa Monastery opened a primary school in Wachet, provided grants for students, and delivered humanitarian relief to civilians after Cyclone Nargis in 2008. Sayadaw U Lakkhana died in 2014.

== Facilities and services ==
The hospital has 50 beds, but often accommodates up to 200 patients.

In 2014, according to a hospital pamphlet, the average number of medical outpatients per month was 131. The average numbers of dental, ENT, and dermatological cases were 341, 59, and 34 per month, respectively. An average of 322 patients per month received acupuncture, and an average of 284 were treated with other forms of traditional medicine.

There are about 50 permanent staff members, including one doctor, five nurses, nine paramedics, and five administrators. The hospital has three operating theatres, one laser treatment room in the outpatient department, and five dental chairs. Additional facilities include a laboratory, a radiology department, and a traditional medicine and acupuncture unit. Four air conditioned rooms with attached bathrooms, as well as five beds and bathrooms in the main hall, are reserved for VIP patients.

The hospital provides a variety of health services throughout the week, but certain procedures that must be performed by specialists are only available during certain days and times. Physicians, surgeons, and dental surgeons from Mandalay are available on Sunday mornings; the dental surgeons are also available on Saturdays. An acupuncture team from Mandalay provides services on Wednesdays and Saturdays. Eye specialists and ear, nose, and throat (ENT) teams from Mandalay come on Thursdays.

For billing purposes, the hospital divides patients into three categories. Those in the first category, including monks, nuns, and yogis, receive treatment free of charge. Those in the second category—low-income or otherwise disadvantaged patients—are charged a small portion of their treatment costs. All other patients are responsible for the total or most of the cost of their treatment.

== Affiliated organizations ==
Wachet does not receive funding from the Myanmar government. It is supported by donations and volunteers from both domestic and international organizations, including Japan Heart, the RANZCO Eye Foundation, the Brighter Future Foundation, and Vipassana Hawai’i.

=== Japan Heart ===
Japan Heart, a volunteer-based international healthcare organization based in Tokyo, was founded in 2004 by Dr. Hideto Yoshioka. The organization operates in both Myanmar and Cambodia, and began working with Wachet Hospital in May 2004. Japanese doctors and nurses assist local staff members in treating patients, and also work to improve the medical techniques used at the hospital. In Myanmar, Japan Heart volunteers help treat approximately 10,000 outpatients and perform up to 2,000 surgical operations per year. In 2004, its medical volunteers conducted, on average, 1,001 outpatient procedures and 154 operations per month. Its other initiatives in Myanmar include the Dream Development Center, or "Dream Train", a child development center in Yangon founded in 2010. Also in 2010, with funding from the Japanese Ministry of Foreign Affairs, Japan Heart opened a vocational training center for the visually impaired in Myanmar.

=== RANZCO Eye Foundation ===
The RANZCO Eye Foundation is a nonprofit organization, founded in 2002, that represents over 800 ophthalmologists in Australia and New Zealand. It funds a number of initiatives, including sustainable eye care programs in disadvantaged communities in both countries, research on the causes of vision loss, and community awareness campaigns about eye health. It works with Wachet Hospital on the Myanmar Eye Care Project (MECP), which aims to reduce preventable vision loss and improve eye care in rural Myanmar. MECP is led by Dr. Geoff Cohn, a Sydney-based ophthalmologist. Eight times per year, Dr. Cohn leads a team of over 40 Australian ophthalmologists, technicians, and support staff to the hospital to treat eye diseases such as cataracts and glaucoma. The foundation also provides ophthalmic surgical equipment to the hospital and trains local specialists to perform eye care procedures in the absence of the Australian team. MECP has performed over 12,000 surgeries and currently performs 5,000 per year throughout Myanmar. In 2014, at Wachet Hospital alone, MECP treated 1,500 patients. It has also provided services to four other monastery-based eye care centers and one non-monastery-based clinic in Myanmar.

=== Brighter Future Foundation ===
The Brighter Future Foundation (BFF) is a nonprofit organization founded by Zwe Nanda and Dr. Thinn Thinn Hlaing in 2005. It provides health services and equipment to public hospitals, helps educate health care professionals, and supports undergraduate and postgraduate medical education in Myanmar. In July 2013, its doctors and volunteers provided free diabetes care to 270 patients at Wachet Hospital, offering each patient blood tests (to measure kidney function, lipid profile, glycated hemoglobin (HbA1c), and blood sugar), urine tests, and a one-week supply of medication. In August 2014, the team made another visit. The foundation also gave the hospital an Afinion HbA1c analyzer, which measures glycated hemoglobin levels in blood.

=== Vipassana Hawai’i/MettaDana Project ===
Vipassana Hawai’i, based in Hawaii, promotes the teachings of Buddha as preserved in the Pāli Canon of Theravada Buddhism. In 1995, Steven Smith of Vipassana, in collaboration with Sayadaw U Lakkhana and the Kyaswa Monastery, started the MettaDana Project, which provides funding, staff support, medicines, and other supplies to Wachet Hospital. The group has arranged a public health training program on HIV/AIDS and funded additional training programs for the hospital’s technical and clerical workers. In addition, Vipassana helped establish the acupuncture training and treatment program at the hospital. The MettaDana Project collects charitable donations, which are then distributed to communities in Myanmar through the Kyaswa Monastery. In addition to its support for the hospital, it has provided educational grants to approximately 300 primary school students in Wachet, helped fund a new primary school in Wachet village, and assisted with humanitarian relief after Cyclone Nargis.

== See also ==
- Health in Burma
