= University of Community Health, Magway =

Health University

Coordinates: 20.19258°N 94.94158°E

- အခြေခံ ကျန်းမာရေးတက္ကသိုလ် (မကွေး)
- Motto: To born public health specialists to uplift health status of the nation
- Type: public
- Established: 1995; 31 years ago
- Affiliations: Ministry of Health
- Rector: Dr. Aby
- Faculty: 102 (2009)
- Administrative staff: 256 (2009)
- Location: Magway; Magway Division, Myanmar
- Website: www.uch.gov.mm

Main entrance road to the university

Another entrance

The University of Community Health, Magway (UCH) (Burmese: အခြေခံ ကျန်းမာရေး တက္ကသိုလ် (မကွေး), pronounced [tɕáɰ̃màjé tɛʔkəθò (məɡwé)]) is a Community Health University under the Ministry of Health (Myanmar), and located in Magway city, Myanmar. The university offers a four-year Bachelor of Community Health (B.Comm.H) degree program. Students have to study how to perform community health. Also, they must take clinical subjects as integration for rural population that cannot get primary healthcare. Formally, the graduates are allowed to practice as Health Assistants (HA) in Department of Public Health and Food and Drug Administration of Myanmar, many of whom are the main providers of primary healthcare in rural Myanmar where access to regular physicians is difficult.

First, it was established as Health Assistant’s training school in Yangon in 1951. Health Assistant’s training school and Aung San Health Demonstration Unit (Field Department) were combined and emerged as School of Health Science for Basic Health Workers in December 1991 that was upgraded up to University of Community Health in 1996. The University moved to Magway in 2000. Field Department was also moved to Tawsaint village, Salin Township in 2006.

Nowadays, most of the alumni are working in various sectors such as NGOs, INGOs, UN, Department of Food and Drug Administration and Department of Public Health of Myanmar Government.

== History ==
With the guidance and national health policy of U Nu's Government the Health Assistant Training School was established in 1951 in Yangon to provide health care to rural population where access to regular medical doctors are difficult. The main objective of that training school is to produce the health assistant within a short time (three years) while the medical doctors were trained for six year. Later, The school was moved a few kilometers north to Insein in 1963, and then to Hlegu in 1968. In 1989, the school came under the purview of the Ministry of Health. The school became the Institute of Community Health in 1991, and became a university in 1995 and began offering a four-year bachelor's degree program. The objective of the university of community health is also change and wide scope. In 1999, the military government moved the school out of Yangon Division to Upper Myanmar. UCH is located on a 41.4-hectare campus at Htonpauk, about 14.5 km north of Magway, and 3.2 km off the Magway-Natmauk Road.

University of Community Health, Magway regularly accepts approximately 150 students (Male: Female = 70:30) who passed the matriculation examination. The required score for selection is approximately 450 for males and 470 for females.

== Academic departments ==
- Department of Biomedical Science
- Department of Community Health
- Department of Disease Control/Epidemiology
- Department of Health Promotion/Health Education
- Department of Environmental Health
- Department of Educational Science
- Department of Myanmar
- Department of English
- Department of Zoology
- Department of Botany
- Department of Chemistry
- Department of Physics
- Department of Field Research (Salin Township, Taw Saint village)

== Curriculum ==
Each school year lasts ten months from January to October. Students are required to take written, practical, field trip and oral exams at the end of each year.

=== First year ===
==== Coursework with assignment ====
- Biomedical Science

1. Zoology
2. Botany
3. Chemistry
4. Physics

- Communication science

1. Myanmar language
2. English language

- Primary Medical Care

1. Myanmar Traditional Medicine
2. First Aid

==== Coursework with or without assignment ====
- Total Personal Professional Development (TPPD)
- Basic Computer

=== Second year ===
==== Coursework with assignment ====
- Structure and Function of Human Body/Human Anatomy and Physiology
- Vital Statistics
- General Pathology and Pharmacology
- Epidemiology

==== Coursework without assignment ====
- Health Education

=== Third year ===
Third year students are required to make field trips to nearby villages and provide seminars on such health education topics as the natural history of diseases, environmental sanitation, the dangers of smoking/alcohol, rodent control, disaster management and global warming, etc. The seminars are organized by the departments of Health Education, Community Health and Environmental Health. The students then visit a local Rural Health Center (RHC) to learn the operations of an RHC.

==== Coursework with assignment ====
- Disease Control
- Health Education
- Environmental Health
- Educational Science

==== Coursework without assignment ====
- Medicine
- Surgery
- Community Health
- Research Methodology

=== Fourth year ===
- Fourth year students need to make research for protocol. For this we had to go to Rural Health Center, under Magway Region (from October to November).

==== Coursework with assignment ====
- Community Health I
- Community Health II
- Research Methodology
- Medicine
- Surgery
- Research

==== Affiliated teaching hospitals ====
Students are required to study bedside lecture at the following UCH affiliated hospitals in the region for three months(May–July).

- Pakokku General Hospital
- Nyaung U General Hospital
- Meiktila General Hospital
- Field Trip (8 weeks) to rural health center (RHC) for research paper

==== Graduate Program ====
The university offers a range of Master of Community Health (M.Comm.H) degree program in 2017.

== See also ==
- University of Public Health, Yangon
- Ministry of Health
