= Health in Myanmar =

The current population of Myanmar is 67.05 million. It was 27.27 million in 1970. The general state of healthcare in Myanmar (also known as Burma) is poor. The military government of 1962-2011 spent anywhere from 0.5% to 3% of the country's GDP on healthcare. Healthcare in Myanmar is consistently ranked among the lowest in the world. In 2015, in congruence with a new democratic government, a series of healthcare reforms were enacted. In 2017, the reformed government spent 5.2% of GDP on healthcare expenditures. Health indicators have begun to improve as spending continues to increase. Patients continue to pay the majority of healthcare costs out of pocket. Although, out of pocket costs were reduced from 85% to 62% from 2014 to 2015. They continue to drop annually. The global average of healthcare costs paid out of pocket is 32%. Both public and private hospitals are understaffed due to a national shortage of doctors and nurses. Public hospitals lack many of the basic facilities and equipment. WHO consistently ranks Myanmar among the worst nations in healthcare.

As of 2020, Myanmar had a total population of over 54 million people. The increased population has brought with it a need for change and modernization within the healthcare sector. The administration of the healthcare system is distributed between the public and private sectors, in terms of finance and supply. Nevertheless, all administrative functions are ultimately overseen by the Ministry of Health (MoH).

The Ministry of Health is further divided into six departments which provide healthcare services to the entire population. Basic healthcare services and primary healthcare are catered to by the Department of Public Health. The Department of Medical Services oversees treatments and rehabilitation facilities, while the Department of Medical research conducts nation-wide surveys and research for medical development. The training of medical health professionals is the duty of the Department of Health Professional Resource Development (HPRD) and Management. Other areas within the ministry include the Department of Food and Drug Administration, and the Department of Traditional Medicine.

The Human Rights Measurement Initiative finds that Myanmar is fulfilling 81.5% of what it should be fulfilling for the right to health based on its level of income. When looking at the right to health with respect to children, Myanmar achieves 89.9% of what is expected based on its current income. In regards to the right to health amongst the adult population, the country achieves only 83.5% of what is expected based on the nation's level of income. Myanmar falls into the "very bad" category when evaluating the right to reproductive health because the nation is fulfilling only 71.2% of what the nation is expected to achieve based on the resources (income) it has available.

== Health infrastructure ==
Burma has 6 medical universities: 5 civilian and one military. All are operated by the government and recognised by the Myanmar Medical Council. They are:

1. University of Medicine-1, Yangon
2. University of Medicine-2, Yangon
3. Defence Services Medical Academy
4. University of Medicine, Mandalay
5. University of Medicine, Magway
6. University of Medicine, Taunggyi
7. University of Community Health, Magway

In March 2012, Okayama University announced it was planning to build a medical academy in the country, tentatively named the Rinsho Academy, which would be the first foreign-run medical school in the country.

== Health Economy ==
GDP per capita: US$1,407.81 (2019)

Myanmar spends 4.79% of its total GDP in the health sector.

Current health expenditure per capita (current US$) - Myanmar VS World.
	2009	2010	2011	2012	2013	2014	2015	2016	2017	2018
Myanmar	18.1	19.6	26.5	36.1	36.5	52.6	61.7	57.9	57.8	59.2
World	875.7	914.2	988.7	999.03	1015.7	1039.9	999.1	1020.8	1064.9	1111

== Health status ==
=== Disease burden ===
Disease burden or burden of disease is a concept used to describe the death and loss of health due to diseases, injuries and risk factors. One most common measure used to measure the disease burden is disability adjusted life year (DALY). Developed in 1993, the indicator is a health gap measure and simply the sum of years lost due to premature death and years lived with disability. One DALY represents a loss of one year of healthy life.

In the report of IHME 2019, Myanmar has observed a drop down since 1990 on various health indicators however it is still high compared to the global average.

The Disease burden causes are categorised into 3 common groups of communicable diseases, non-communicable disease (NCD) and injuries.

In 1990, Respiratory infection and Tuberculosis was the top causes of disease burden, 5,846 DALYs per 100,000 lives which had reduced to 1,977 per 100,000 lives in 2019 with a decline of 66.17%

53% decline in Maternal and neonatal death from 1990 to 2019 but it is still the top cause of death in Myanmar at a rate of 2,556 DALYs per 100.000 lives for 2019.

In recent years, cardiovascular diseases are the leading cause of death in Myanmar.

Disability Adjusted Life Year
DALYs	2000	2017
DALY rates from communicable, neonatal, maternal & nutritional diseases	33,281.03	10,545.56
DALY rates from non-communicable diseases (NCDs)	35,100.14	24,902.13
DALY rates from injuries	5,993.53	3,916.74
DALYs from mental health and substance use disorders	469,236.62	642,053.69

=== Life Expectancy at birth ===
In 2020, Myanmar had an average life expectancy at birth of just over 67 years. This was an increase of approximately 3 years from 2019 and 8 years from 2009 according to world bank.

=== Maternal and child healthcare ===
In reference to 2017 world bank data, the maternal mortality ratio for 2017 was 250 deaths per 100,000 live births, a 2.04% increase from 2016 which was 245 deaths per 100,000 live births and 5.6% declined from 2010 maternal mortality ratio of 265 deaths per 100,000 live births. This can be compared to the Southeast Asia average, which is 163 in 2017.

Maternal Mortality Rate, Myanmar VS World (Per 100k live births)
	2009	2010	2011	2012	2013	2014	2015	2016	2017
Myanmar	274	265	259	254	251	247	246	245	250
Global	257	248	241	234	229	224	219	214	211

According to myanmar.unfpa.org 63 per cent of deliveries take place at home, where 30 per cent of maternal deaths occur. The main causes of deaths are post-partum haemorrhage (bleeding), hypertensive disorders of pregnancy (such as eclampsia), consequences of unsafe abortions, and sepsis (a whole-body inflammatory response to infection). Deaths are significantly higher in rural areas, where women have limited access to reproductive health services. Most maternal deaths can be prevented through cost-effective interventions such as the presence of skilled birth attendants during deliveries, emergency obstetric care, and access to birth-spacing commodities and services.

The antenatal care coverage rate is 81%, while skilled birth attendants are present at 60 per cent of deliveries. The main constraints are limited access to health services due to poverty, geographical barriers, and a shortage of health personnel, especially midwives. The availability of skilled birth attendants is far below the level recommended by the WHO: an additional 7,000 additional midwives are needed in Myanmar. An additional concern is the quality of services.

The total fertility rate is 2.51. However, fertility among married women is significantly higher at 4.99. The contraceptive prevalence rate is 52.2%, and the unmet need for family planning is 16%. Abortion complications are one of the leading causes of maternal deaths. Ensuring adequate supply of contraceptives and improving quality of birth spacing services are crucial to reducing unintended and unwanted pregnancies and abortions

Infant Mortality Rate In 2019, According to world bank data, the infant mortality rate in Myanmar was at about 35.8 deaths per 1,000 live births. a 14.7% decline from 2013 data, that was 42 deaths per 1,000 live births in 2013 and a 28.8% decline from 2009 where the infant mortality rate was 50.3 deaths per 1,000 live births. Maximum number of deaths occur in the first year of life, where more than 60% occur within the first month.

Infant mortality rate, Myanmar VS Global (per 1000 live births)
	2009	2010	2011	2012	2013	2014	2015	2016	2017	2018	2019
Myanmar	50.3	48.6	46.8	45.1	43.5	42	40.7	39.4	38.2	37	35.8
Global	38.3	37	35.7	34.5	33.5	32.5	31.5	30.7	29.8	29	28.2

The neonatal Mortality Rate in Myanmar for 2019 was 22.4 per 1,000 live births. 9.6% decline from 2015 neonatal death rate of 24.8 and 20.5% decline from 2010 data of 28.2 death rate per 1,000 live births.

Under 5 Mortality Rate the report from World Bank Open Data. In 2019, it was 44.7 death per 1,000 live birth as compared to the 2015 neonatal death rate of 51.8 and 2011 neonatal death rate of 60.7.

In 2018, around 14.1 percent of the population were undernourished in Myanmar. This was a decrease from 2009, in which approximately 19 percent of Myanmar's population were undernourished.

In 2019, 84 percent of children aged between 12 and 23 months were immunized against measles in Myanmar. Comparatively, in the year before 93 percent of children aged between 12 and 23 months in Myanmar were immunized against measles.

In 2019, 90 percent of children aged between 12 and 23 months in Myanmar were immunized against diphtheria, pertussis and tetanus (DPT). This was an increase from 2013, in which 75 percent of children aged between 12 and 23 months in Myanmar were immunized against DPT.

=== HIV/AIDS ===
HIV/AIDS recognised as a disease of concern by the Burmese Ministry of Health, is most prevalent among sex workers and intravenous drug users. In 2005, the estimated adult HIV prevalence rate in Burma was 1.3% (200,000 - 570,000 people), according to UNAIDS, and early indicators show that the epidemic may be waning in the country, although the epidemic continues to expand. The National AIDS Programme Burma found that 32% of sex workers and 43% of intravenous drug users in Burma have HIV.

The national government spent US$137,120 (K150,831,600) in 2005 on HIV, while international donors (the governments of Norway, the Netherlands, United Kingdom, and Sweden) donated US$27,711,813 towards HIV programmes in Burma. Burma (ranked 51 out of 166 countries) has one of Asia's highest adult HIV prevalence rates, following Cambodia and Thailand. An estimated 20,000 (range of 11,000 to 35,000) die from HIV/AIDS annually.

In 2019, it was estimated that approximately 240 thousand people in Myanmar were living with HIV, 0.7% adult HIV prevalence (ages15-49), 10,000 new HIV infections. 7,700 AIDS- related deaths, 77%adults on antiretroviral treatment, 73% children on antiretroviral treatment as recorded by Joint United Nations Programme on HIV/AIDS.

The key infected population in Myanmar are People who inject drugs (PWID), Men who have sex with men (MSM), Sex workers, Young people (15-24 age) and migrants.

Although sustained and focused efforts to reach key populations have led to major reductions in HIV infections between 2010 and 2017, Myanmar continues to display a high incidence of new HIV infections. People who inject drugs are the group most affected by HIV in Myanmar. This is largely due to the endemic use of drugs, which are farmed, manufactured and distributed, in the northern regions of the country. Although access to HIV treatment is expanding, the country's low financial investment in public health appears to be a major barrier to the success of HIV programmes.

=== Tuberculosis ===
Tuberculosis (TB) remains one of the major public health problems in Myanmar. Directly Observed Treatment Short Course (DOTS) strategy was introduced in 1997 and it covered all the townships since November 2003. It was followed by STOP TB Strategy from the year 2007 to 2015 and changed to End TB Strategy from 2016 onward. During 2015 to 2019, National TB Programme (NTP) achieved case notification rate for all forms of TB at around 267 per 100,000 population and treatment success rate of 87 percent. This indicates the emphasis on case holding activities all over the country in collaboration with 32 implementing partners including ethnic health organizations.

=== Injuries ===
In Myanmar, injury has been one of the top leading causes of morbidity and mortality. In the report of Myanmar statistical 2021, it has shown increased from about 370,000 in 2016 to 460,000 in 2019. More than 80 percent of total incidents were attributable to vehicle accidents (45 to 51 percent), accident on farm (16 to 25 percent) and fighting (12 to 14 percent) across these four years period.

In 2019, the highest number of total injuries 62,300 was reported from Sagaing Region followed by Mandalay Region with about 50,200 reported cases and Bago and Ayeyarwady Regions with more than 40,000 reported injuries.

During the same period of 2016 to 2019, the number of deaths increased from about 11,300 to 15,300 which corresponded to the death rate of 3.1 percent to 3.4 percent among cases. More than 75 percent of injury deaths were attributable to vehicle accident (41 to 43 percent), drowning (23 to 24 percent) and suicides (13 to 15 percent) across the years.

For each cause of injuries, the case specific fatality rate was the highest for drowning at about 80 percent followed by suicides at about 50 percent and poisoning at about 7 percent.

=== Nutritional Status ===
The findings from large scale sequential studies showed slight declining trends of stunting, underweight and wasting among under-five children from 2010 to 2018, however the under nutrition remains one of the public health problems for under-five children in Myanmar. In 2018, one in four of the under-five children was stunted and one in five was underweight. Children living in Chin State and Ayeyarwady Region have the higher probability of being stunted compared with those living in other states and regions. In addition, findings from the "Micronutrient and Food Consumption Survey" highlighted that at least three in ten of children or teenagers or women were being anaemic which is a common consequence of micronutrient deficiencies such as iron, folic acid, vitamin B12, etc.

=== Malaria ===
Myanmar made significant progress in malaria control in the 2010s, with an 80 percent reduction in the number of confirmed malaria cases registered from 2011 to 2016 (from 567,452 to 110,146 respectively) and a 96 percent reduction in the number of deaths attributable to malaria has been reported in the same period (from 581 to 21 respectively). Yet the malaria burden in Myanmar remains the highest among the six countries of the Greater Mekong Subregion, and an early warning sign of artemisinin resistance – delayed parasite clearance – has been reported in several parts of the country.

Despite this, the annual monitoring of the therapeutic efficacy of first- and second-line recommended artemisinin-based combination therapies (artemether-lumefantrine and dihydroartemisinin-piperaquine) has shown that both are still fully efficacious with an adequate clinical and parasitological response above 95 percent. P. falciparum, accounting for 60 percent of all malaria cases, and P. vivax are the major parasite species, and there are 10 malaria-transmitting mosquito species. Analysis of the age and the sex distribution of malaria cases shows that the majority of cases occur in adult males, reflecting the risk associated with occupations such as mining, rubber tapping, construction, and forest-related activities.

The ultimate goal of Myanmar's National Strategic Plan for Intensifying Malaria Control and Accelerating Progress Towards Malaria Elimination (2016–2020) is to eliminate P. falciparum malaria by 2025 and all forms of malaria by 2030.

== See also ==
- COVID-19 pandemic in Myanmar
- National Herbal Park
- The Wachet Jivitadana Sangha Hospital
- Women's health in Myanmar
