= University of Pharmacy, Mandalay =

Higher education institute in Mandalay, Myanmar

Coordinates: 21°52′25.7″N 96°10′54.7″E

- ဆေးဝါး တက္ကသိုလ် (မန္တလေး)
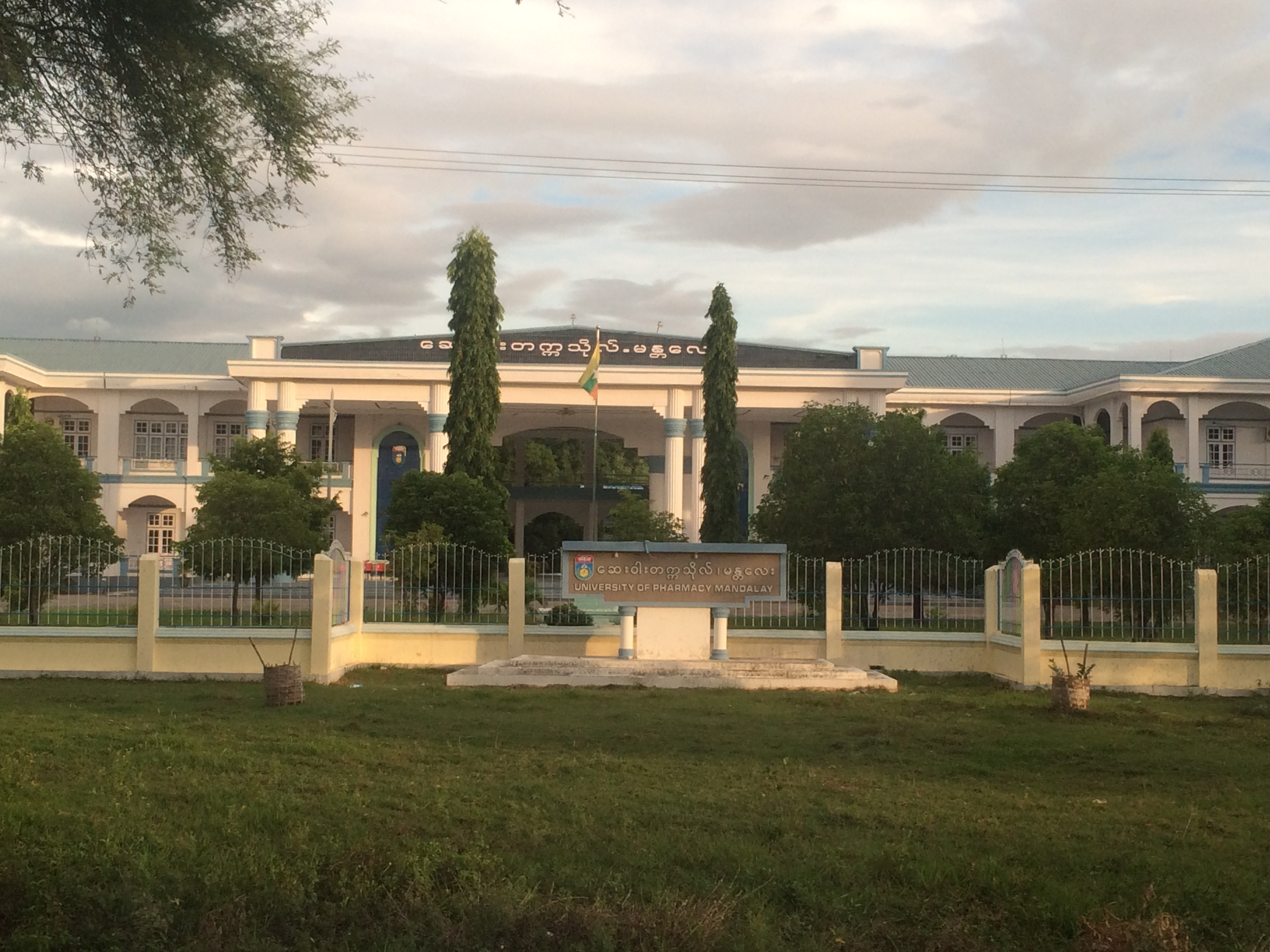
- Motto: အဘယ ဝိပါက ဂုဏ (Quality Efficacy Safety)
- Type: public
- Affiliations: Ministry of Health
- Rector: Professor Dr.Thein May Saw (ဘောမ)
- Location: Mandalay; Mandalay Division, Myanmar
- Website: www.uopmdy.gov.mm

The University of Pharmacy, Mandalay (Burmese: ဆေးဝါး တက္ကသိုလ် (မန္တလေး), pronounced [sʰéwá tɛʔkəθò (máɰ̃dəlé)]), located in Mandalay, is one of two pharmacy schools in Myanmar. The university offers a Bachelor of Pharmacy (B.Pharm.) degree which is a 4-year full-time program.

== See also ==
- University of Pharmacy, Yangon
