= Phyo Pyae Sone =

Burmese pop singer

Sitt Hmue Pyae Sone
- ဖြိုးပြည့်စုံ
- Born: Burma
- Education: University of Medicine 1, Yangon
- Occupation: Singer
- Years active: 2010–present
- Website: Phyo Pyae Sone on Facebook

Sitt Hmue Pyae Sone is a Burmese pop singer. He debuted after winning the 2010 season of Melody World, a local singing competition. His first album, Every Hope (မျှော်နိုင်သမျှ) was released in 2015. In 2018, he collaborated with Aung Htet to release another album, Star (ကြယ်).

== Early life and education ==
He is a physician by training, having attended University of Medicine 1, Yangon.

== Personal life ==
On 7 October 2019, Phyo and two others, Nyein Chan Ko, and Ronny San Lwin, were falsely arrested on charges of drug possession. They were subsequently released on 9 October 2019, after police authorities determined they had been falsely arrested.

== Discography ==
- Every Hope (မျှော်နိုင်သမျှ) (2015)
- With Many Loves (အချစ်များစွာနဲ့) (2017)
- Thingyan Lay Nyin Lu Lin (သင်္ကြန်လေညင်းလုလင်) (2018)
- Star (ကြယ်) (2018)
