= Myanmar Youth Affairs Committee =

Governmental body in Myanmar

Myanmar Youth Affairs Committee မြန်မာနိုင်ငံလူငယ်ရေးရာကော်မတီ
Government overview
- Formed: 22 May 2019
- Headquarters: Myanmar
- Government executive: Win Myat Aye, Chairman
- Parent department: Government of Myanmar

Myanmar Youth Affairs Committee is a government committee for Myanmar Youths to become Multi-developed citizens . It was formed on the 22 May 2019 with 27 members. The committee is led by Union Minister for Social Welfare, Relief and Resettlement, Dr Win Myat Aye.

Many other Youth affairs committees were formed in each Region, District and Township to initiate youth policies and the committees are composed of officials from different government departments.
