= Myo Myint =

Burmese orthopaedic surgeon

Myo Myint FRCS
- မျိုးမြင့်
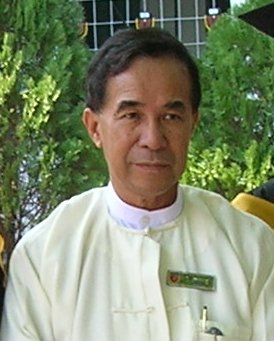

President of the Myanmar Medical Association
- In office 1999–2005
- Preceded by: Ye Myint
- Succeeded by: Kyaw Myint Naing

Rector of the University of Medicine 1, Yangon
- In office 21 February 1998 – 24 February 2007
- Preceded by: Kyaw Myint
- Succeeded by: Aye Maung Han

Personal details
- Born: 25 February 1944 Yegyi, Pathein District, Japanese Burma
- Died: 15 May 2013 (aged 69) Yangon, Myanmar
- Education: Institute of Medicine, Rangoon (M.B., B.S.)
- Occupation: Surgeon, educator

Myo Myint FRCS (Burmese: မျိုးမြင့်; 25 February 1944 – 15 May 2013) was a Burmese orthopaedic surgeon. He served as the president of the Myanmar Medical Association (MMA) from 1999 to 2005, and the rector of the University of Medicine 1, Yangon from 1998 to 2007. In 1977, Myo Myint became the first surgeon in Burma to successfully replant a totally amputated hand. From 1988 to 1990, he served as the head of the University of Medicine 2, Yangon's orthopaedics department. Myo Myint was born in Yegyi, Pathein District on 25 February 1944 during the Japanese occupation.
