= Sujoy B. Roy =

Indian cardiologist

- Born: Myanmar
- Died: 25 March 1976; New Delhi, India
- Occupations: Cardiologist; Medical administrator
- Known for: Preventive cardiology
- Awards: Padma Bhushan; ICMR Basanti Devi Amir Chand Prize; FICCI Award

Sujoy Bhushan Roy was an Indian cardiologist and the founder Head of the department of the Cardiology at the All India Institute of Medical Sciences, Delhi. He was the president of the Cardiological Society of India in 1972. He was known for medical research in cardiology and was reported to have coined the name, Juvenile Rheumatic Stenosis. The Government of India awarded him the third highest civilian honour of the Padma Bhushan, in 1972, for his contributions to medical science.

== Biography ==
Sujoy Roy was born in Myanmar (erstwhile Burma) and graduated in medicine from Rangoon University Medical School before completing his post graduate studies at Edinburgh and at Brigham and Boston City Hospital where he trained under renowned cardiologists such as Benedict Massell and Walter Abelmann. After working for a while at Brigham and Boston City Hospital, he moved to Harvard University as a member of its medical faculty when Amrit Kaur, the then Minister of Health of India, invited him to the All India Institute of Medical Sciences, Delhi as the head of the department of cardiology, which was a newly formed department at that time. Roy returned to India to take up the position in 1958.

Roy has done known researches on rheumatic fever and rheumatic heart diseases. As a fellow of the Armed Forces Medical Research Council of India, he studied the cardio-respiratory problems at high altitudes and his work was reported to have assisted the Indian Armed Forces for their troop mobilization in regions like the Himalayas. His work on Stenosis helped in the understanding the disease presently known by name coined by him as Juvenile Rheumatic Stenosis. His researches have been documented by way of over 150 medical papers published in international journals. He was associated with the World Health Organization as a member of their Cardiovascular Expert Committee. It was under his leadership, the cardiology department of AIIMS, Delhi developed into a modern cardio care facility where he performed the first cardiac catheterization in India in 1962. He headed the Cardiological Society of India in 1972. A Massachussehts Heart Fellow, Roy was a recipient of the Basanti Devi Amir Chand Prize of the Indian Council of Medical Research and the FICCI Award of the Federation of Indian Chambers of Commerce and Industry. The Government of India awarded him the civilian honour of the Padma Bhushan in 1972. He died on 25 March 1976 in New Delhi, survived by his wife.

== See also ==
- All India Institute of Medical Sciences Delhi
