= Naga Thein Hlaing =

Burmese surgeon (1933–2021)

- နာဂသိန်းလှိုင်
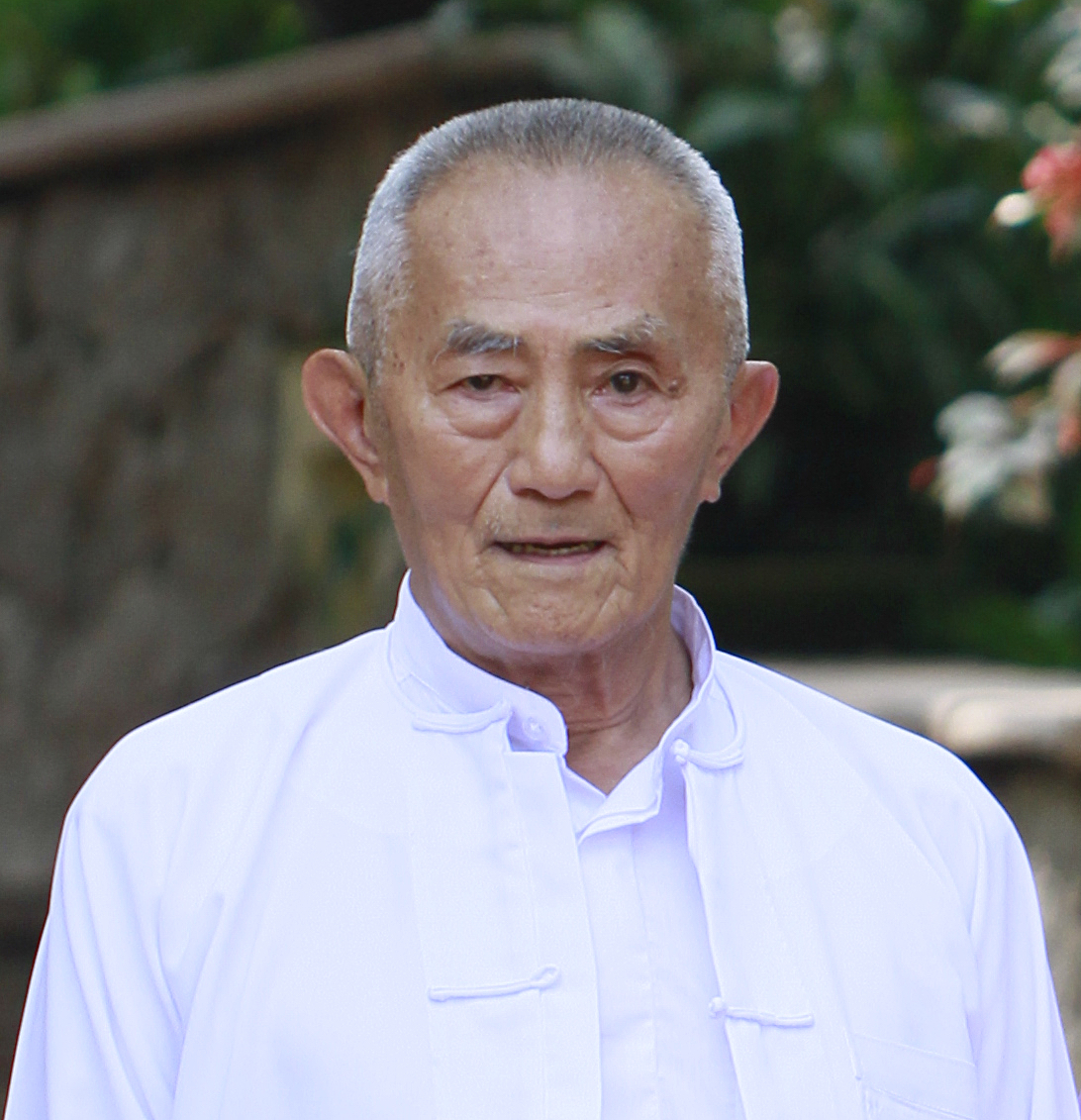
- Naga Thein Hlaing in 2012
- Born: Thein Hlaing; 3 November 1933; Thaton, Tenasserim Division, Burma Province, India (modern-day Mon State, Myanmar)
- Died: 10 August 2021 (aged 87); Yangon, Myanmar
- Resting place: Yay Way Cemetery, Yangon
- Other names: Edward Thompson Hoke Wang, Shwe Darr Bo
- Citizenship: Burmese
- Education: University of Medicine 1, Yangon
- Occupation: Surgeon
- Years active: 1962–1988

Thein Hlaing (Burmese: သိန်းလှိုင်; also Edward Thompson Hoke Wang; 3 November 1933 – 10 August 2021), known honorifically as Naga Thein Hlaing (Burmese: နာဂသိန်းလှိုင်, pronounced [nàga̰ θéɪɰ̃ l̥àɪɰ̃]), was a Burmese surgeon. He was well known for his performance of endocrine surgery in the Naga Hills of northwestern Burma, using local anesthetic only. Since he was able to cure goitre, which local shamans could not do, Thein Hlaing was recognized by the local residents as Naga Nat (God of Naga) and was worshiped as a deity.

Naga Thein Hlaing is highly respected among Burmese doctors. His life story is still part of popular Burmese medical history, in which he is portrayed as a heroic figure.

== Early life and education ==
Thein Hlaing was born in 1933 in Thaton, Burma Province, India to a family of Chinese descent. His father wanted him to take over the family business and become a merchant, but Thein Hlaing instead chose medicine. He graduated with a MBBS degree from the University of Medicine 1, Yangon.

== Career ==
During his university years, Thein Hlaing served as a general secretary of the Medical College Students' Union in 1957 and of the Young Doctors Association (YDA) in 1960. During his internship as a surgeon, Thein Hlaing led a strike against the government for paying interns at a low rate in public hospitals.

He worked as an assistant doctor in Myeik Township in 1962. From 1965 to 1971, Thein Hlaing was sent as a surgeon to Sinklaing Hkamti, a town of the Naga Hills, in Sagaing Region.

At that time, about 70% of the population in the Naga Hills suffered from goitre. He operated on patients with goitre and other surgical conditions common in the region. He faced many difficulties and had to educate and persuade the Naga people, who did not want to accept surgery. In order to gain their cooperation, he pledged his life on his work.

Without adequate surgical instruments, Thein Hlaing operated to alleviate thyroid disease, a common condition in the area, performing surgery even under trees or outside huts. Winning over local people who had formerly relied on spirits to cure their diseases, he became known as the God of Naga.

According to him, the total number of patients who underwent local anesthesia was 2,895 in the 47-year period from 2009 until his retirement. No one had died while he was operating.

== Later life ==
Thein Hlaing retired as a government employee on 30 April 1988, without receiving a pension. On 15 January 2020, at the Naga New Year Day ceremony, he was given the certificate of honour by the Leading Body of the Naga Self-Administered Zone for his contributions to the Naga people.

He died on 10 August 2021, at the age of 87, in Yangon.

== In popular culture ==
Naga Thein Hlaing is a protagonist in the 2016 novel The Sweet Honey Drop on the Sharp Scalpel Blade by Nyi Pu Lay. The book won the National Literature Award for Fiction in 2017.

Writer Kyaw Kyaw Win stated that "Dr. Naga Thein Hlaing is the only doctor who can operate on the goitre with local anesthesia in the history of the world of medicine".
