= Kyaw Myint =

Burmese physician (born 1940)

- ကျော်မြင့်

Member of the Pyithu Hluttaw
- In office 31 January 2011 – 29 January 2016
- Preceded by: Constituency established
- Succeeded by: Myo Naing
- Constituency: Chanayethazan Township
- Majority: 30,591 (41.85%)

Minister for Health of Myanmar
- In office 1 February 2003 – 30 March 2011
- Preceded by: Kat Sein
- Succeeded by: Pe Thet Khin

Deputy Minister for Health of Myanmar
- In office 2000–2003

Rector of University of Medicine 1, Yangon
- In office 17 September 1997 – 20 February 1998
- Preceded by: Kyaw Myint Tun
- Succeeded by: Myo Myint

Personal details
- Born: 22 January 1940 (age 86) Burma
- Party: Union Solidarity and Development Party
- Spouse: Nilar Thaw
- Children: Hnin Kalayar Kyaw Myint
- Education: Institute of Medicine, Rangoon (M.B., B.S.)
- Occupation: Professor of University of Medicine 1, Yangon

Kyaw Myint (Burmese: ကျော်မြင့်, born 22 January 1940) is a Burmese physician and former Minister of Health. He previously served as a member of parliament in the House of Representatives for Chanayethazan Township constituency. He has served as the personal physician of Than Shwe, the country's former head of state.
