= Sein Myint =

Burmese politician

- စိန်မြင့်

Member-elect of the Pyithu Hluttaw
- Preceded by: Constituency established
- Succeeded by: Constituency abolished
- Constituency: Bogale № 2
- Majority: 28,259 (55%)

Personal details
- Born: 13 April 1954 (age 72) Gadongani village, Bogale Township, Burma
- Party: National League for Democracy
- Relations: Than Tun (father); Khin Sein (mother)
- Education: Rangoon Institute of Medicine
- Occupation: Politician and physician

Sein Myint (Burmese: စိန်မြင့်) is a Burmese politician and former political prisoner. In the 1990 Burmese general election, he was elected as a Pyithu Hluttaw member of parliament, winning a majority of 28,259 (55% of the votes), but was never allowed to assume his seat.

In 1980, he obtained a medical degree (MBBS) from the Rangoon Institute of Medicine and ran a private clinic from 1981 to 1989.

From 9 August to 30 October 1989, he was sentenced to the Bassein prison under the 1975 State Protection Act's Article 10a, for his involvement in organizing a trip by Aung San Suu Kyi to the Irrawaddy Division. From November 1991 to January 1992, he was arrested for allegedly participating in the Karen National Union's underground movement.
