= University of Pharmacy, Yangon =

Higher education institute in Yangon, Myanmar

Coordinates: 16°55′07.6″N 96°09′26.1″E

- ဆေးဝါး တက္ကသိုလ် (ရန်ကုန်)
- Motto: အဘယ ဝိပါက ဂုဏ
- Motto in English: Safety, Quality and Efficacy
- Type: Public
- Established: 30 January 1992; 34 years ago
- Affiliations: Ministry of Health and Sports
- Rector: Prof. Dr. Latt Latt Win
- Administrative staff: 103
- Location: North Okkalapa Yangon; Yangon Division, Myanmar
- Website: www.uopygn.gov.mm

The University of Pharmacy, Yangon (Burmese: ဆေးဝါး တက္ကသိုလ် (ရန်ကုန်) [sʰéwá tɛʔkəθò (jàɰ̃ɡòʊɰ̃)]), located in North Okkalapa, Yangon, is one of two pharmacy schools in Myanmar. The university offers Bachelor of Pharmacy (BPharm), Master of Pharmacy (MPharm) and PhD degree programs. The university accepts approximately 150 students annually based solely on their University Entrance Examination scores.

== Programs ==
The university is one of the two pharmacy universities in Myanmar that offers undergraduate, graduate and doctoral degrees.

- Bachelor of pharmacy (B.pharm.)

- 4 years course

- Master of pharmacy (M.pharm.)

Subject	Duration
Pharmaceutical chemistry	2 years
Pharmaceutics	2 years
Pharmacognosy	2 years
Clinical pharmacy	3 years

- Doctor of philosophy in pharmacy (Ph.D)

Subject	Duration
Pharmaceutical chemistry	2 years
Pharmaceutics	2 years
Pharmacognosy	2 years
Clinical pharmacy	2 years

== See also ==
- University of Pharmacy, Mandalay
- List of universities in Myanmar
