= Gerard Sutton (ophthalmologist) =

Australian ophthalmic surgeon and ophthalmologist

Gerard Sutton is an Australian ophthalmic surgeon and ophthalmologist in Australia and New Zealand. His specialty is laser vision correction, cataract and lens surgery, and corneal transplantation.

== Education ==
Sutton graduated in medicine from the University of New South Wales. After completing his ophthalmic training at Sydney Eye Hospital, he completed advanced surgical training at St Thomas’ and Moorfields Eye Hospitals in London. He followed this with a fellowship in laser vision correction surgery at the Friedrich Alexander University in Erlangen, Germany in 1996.

== Career and research ==
In 2010, Sutton became the inaugural Professor of Corneal and Refractive Surgery at the Sydney Eye Hospital and the University of Sydney. Here he established and continues to supervise the first university degree in the world for refractive vision correction surgery training. He also holds a clinical associate professor position at Auckland University. He continues to see patients as a partner at Vision Eye Institute, Chatswood. In late 2013, Sutton co-authored a book, “The Naked Eye”, with Dr Michael Lawless. The book provided an overview of laser refractive and lens surgery options for prospective patients and health practitioners in optometry and ophthalmology.

He has developed local and international collaborative research relationships across ophthalmology and medical science. Recently with Professor Gordon Wallace of the University of Wollongong, the team developed a novel treatment for the repair of corneal wounds. This initiative developed into BIENCO, a world-first consortium aiming to develop scalable, bioengineered corneal tissue to address the global shortage of donor tissue in the treatment of corneal blindness. The bioengineered corneal tissue aims to replace current Keratoprosthesis options (artificial cornea) to help vision rehabilitation in corneal disease. Serving as project lead, BIENCO was awarded $35 million by the Australian Government through the Medical Research Future Fund (MRFF), one of the largest investments in ophthalmic innovation in Australia to date. BIENCO brings together leading experts in clinical medicine, bioengineering, and governance from the University of Sydney, University of Wollongong, University of Melbourne, Queensland University of Technology, the Centre for Eye Research Australia, and the NSW Organ and Tissue Donation Service.

Gerard Sutton’s involvement in the Myanmar Eye Care Project has been pivotal in helping to develop the community ophthalmic and corneal transplant service in Myanmar and represents an ongoing commitment to development of ophthalmic services in third-world countries. This work was recognised in receiving the XOVA Excellence in Ophthalmology award in 2015 for developing the service in Myanmar. By overseeing the training and development of local ophthalmologists and alongside the organisation of continued government and education support, the program has become self-sufficient tripling the amount of corneal surgical procedures in less than a decade. Identifying continued issues with access for underserved populations in Australia, in particular the Indigenous population, Sutton has been involved in developing screening and treatment opportunities for those in rural or remote communities through the development of the Gadigal Clinic and telehealth service at Sydney Eye Hospital.

He has performed over 20,000 surgical procedures in cornea, cataract and refractive surgery. Sutton has lectured continually on a wide variety of topics within ophthalmology both at home and abroad. In 2018 he was won the individual and team gold medals at the Cataract Olympic Marathon session at the World Ophthalmology Conference in Barcelona, Spain. He has published over 150 peer-reviewed papers and textbook chapters. He has co-authored two books on Keratoconus and Refractive Surgery. He was the Chief Ophthalmologist for the 2000 Olympics and recently named to Asia-Pacific Academy of Ophthalmology's EYE 100 list for most influential ophthalmologists within the region.
