= Zaw Lin Htut =

Burmese politician and doctor

Member of the Amyotha Hluttaw
- In office 3 February 2016 – 1 February 2021
- Constituency: Mon State № 9
- Majority: 51376 votes

Personal details
- Born: 11 February 1964 (age 62) Yangon, Myanmar
- Party: National League for Democracy
- Spouse: Wint Ye Tint
- Parent(s): Maung Maung Oo (father); Daw Tin (mother)
- Education: University of Medicine 1, Yangon

Zaw Lin Htut (Burmese: ဇော်လင်းထွဋ်, born 11 February 1964) is a Burmese politician and medical doctor who is an Amyotha Hluttaw MP for Mon State No. 9 constituency. He is a member of the National League for Democracy.

== Early life and education ==
Zaw Lin Htut was born on 11 February 1964 in Yangon, Myanmar. He graduated with MBBS from University of Medicine 1, Yangon. He is also a medical doctor and opened a private clinic.

== Political career ==
He is a member of the National League for Democracy. In the 2015 Myanmar general election, he was elected as an Amyotha Hluttaw MP, winning a majority of 51376 votes and elected representative from Mon State No. 9 parliamentary constituency.
