= Myint Htwe =

Burmese politician (1948–2026)

His Excellency Dr Myint Htwe
- မြင့်ထွေး
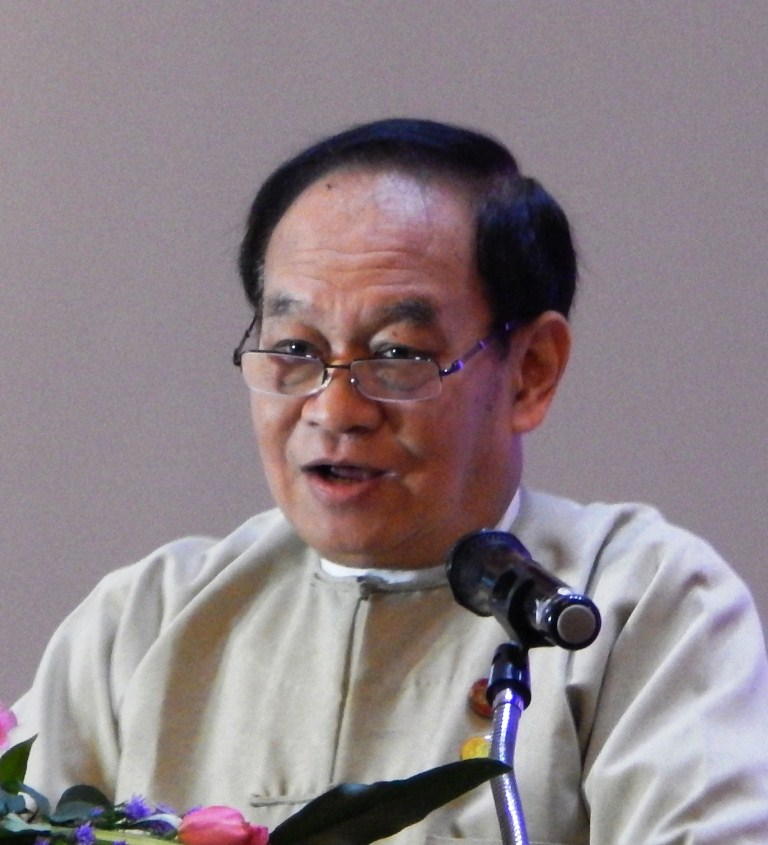
- Myint Htwe in 2018

Minister for Health and Sports
- In office 30 March 2016 – 1 February 2021
- President: Htin Kyaw; Myint Swe (acting); Win Myint
- Deputy: Mya Lay Sein
- Preceded by: Than Aung
- Succeeded by: That Khaing Win

Personal details
- Born: 24 September 1948 Sittwe, Burma
- Died: 26 January 2026 (aged 77) Bangkok, Thailand
- Spouse: Nang Kham Mai
- Children: 2
- Education: Institute of Medicine 1, Rangoon; University of the Philippines; Johns Hopkins University
- Occupation: Public health physician

Myint Htwe (Burmese: မြင့်ထွေး [mjɪ̰ɴ tʰwé]; 24 September 1948 – 26 January 2026) was a Burmese politician and public health physician who served as Minister for Health and Sports of Myanmar.

== Early life and education ==
Myint Htwe was born in Sittwe, Burma (now Myanmar) on 24 September 1948, to Shwe Tha Htwe and Aye Yi.

From 1966 until 1973, he studied at the Institute of Medicine (1), in Rangoon and graduated with a MBBS. From the same institute, he received in 1979 a Diploma (with distinctions in Public Health Administration, Epidemiology & Biostatistics, Environmental Health & Microbiology) in Preventive & Tropical Medicine. After winning a scholarship at the Institute of Public Health, University of the Philippines Systems, he graduated in 1982 with a Master of Public Health. In 1992, he received Doctor of Public Health from the renowned Johns Hopkins University Bloomberg School of Public Health, Baltimore, USA. In 2020, he received a distinguished alumnus award from the Johns Hopkins Bloomberg School of Public Health.

He published a five-book series on public health between 2022 and 2025 and available to download athttps://mbdsnet.org/publication/update-publication/. His aim is to become a force for positive change in global health especially in developing countries.

== Career ==
After graduating, Myint Htwe worked in the Ministry of Health for 17 years. In 1994, he was appointed a Regional Adviser for the WHO South-East Asia Regional Office (WHO SEARO), where he served in various positions until his retirement in 2011. As Director of Programme Management at WHO SEARO he was instrumental in supporting Member Countries in their health development efforts.

Myint Htwe also served as an executive committee member of the Myanmar Academy of Medical Science, Chairperson of the Ethics Review Committee, Department of Medical Research, Ministry of Health, and vice-chairperson of the Myanmar Liver Foundation. As public health physician, he was a chairperson of the Preventive and Social Medicine Society of the Myanmar Medical Association.

In 2014, during the government of former General Thein Sein, he was a member of the committee that drafted two of the four bills designed to regulate religious conversion and population-control measures in Myanmar.

On 22 March 2016, he was nominated as Minister for Health and Sports in President Htin Kyaw's Cabinet, which was Myanmar's first democratically elected civilian government since 1962. On 24 March 2016, the Assembly of the Union confirmed his nomination. In the aftermath of the military-led 2021 Myanmar coup d'état, the Myanmar Armed Forces appointed Thet Khaing Win as Myint Htwe's successor on 1 February 2021.

== Personal life and death ==
Htwe was married to Nang Kham Mai, a medical doctor, and had two children.

Htwe died at the Bumrungrad Hospital in Bangkok, Thailand, on 26 January 2026, at the age of 77.
