= Food and Drug Administration (Myanmar) =

Myanmar's FDA oversees the safety and quality of food and other products

- အစားအသောက်နှင့် ဆေးဝါးကွပ်ကဲရေး ဦးစီးဌာန

Agency overview
- Formed: 1995
- Type: Department
- Jurisdiction: Government of Burma
- Headquarters: Naypyidaw
- Agency executive: Prof. Ye Myint
- Parent agency: Ministry of Health (Burma)
- Website: www.fda.gov.mm

The Department of Food and Drug Administration (Burmese: အစားအသောက်နှင့် ဆေးဝါးကွပ်ကဲရေး ဦးစီးဌာန; abbreviated FDA) is Myanmar's food safety regulatory body, which oversees the safety and quality of food, drugs, medical devices and cosmetics. The FDA was established in 1995. The agency was established under the 1992 National Drug Law, which also established the Food and Drug Board of Authority, which regulates and controls the manufacture, import, export, storage, distribution and sale of food and drugs, in the interests of public safety.

== See also ==
- Ministry of Health (Burma)
