= Prostitution in Myanmar =

Prostitution in Myanmar (also known as Burma) is illegal, but widespread. Prostitution is a major social issue that particularly affects women and children. UNAIDS estimate there to be 66,000 prostitutes in the country.

Women are often lured into prostitution with the promise of legitimate jobs, substantially higher pay, and because their low educational levels makes it difficult for them to find jobs elsewhere. In many instances, such women come from remote regions.

== Current situation ==
In Yangon (Rangoon), prostitution often occurs in hotels that also operate as brothels. The recent appearance of massage parlours began in 1995, with ethnic minority groups such as the Wa running such businesses in particular. Nightclubs in Yangon are also frequented by prostitutes who work independently. Throughout the country, the sex industry generally operates out of restaurants, brothels posing as guesthouses, and nightclubs. Since Cyclone Nargis hit in May 2008, the number of prostitutes in Yangon has increased significantly, thus lowering prices for sexual services.

Mandalay has many prostitutes working in massage parlours, KTV lounges, stage shows and on the streets.

A red-light district has also emerged in Naypyidaw, Burma's new national capital, with brothels primarily disguised as beauty parlors and massage salons that attract mainly businessmen and military personnel. Approximately 70 brothels, mostly in the form of tents and bamboo huts, operate a cheap red light zone on a 30-mile stretch of highway to Naypyidaw.

In all of Southeast Asia, Burma is by far the cheapest when securing the services of a prostitute, eclipsing even the choice and price in Laos.

Sex workers and NGOs report law enforcement to be abusive, violent and corrupt.

== Names ==
Prostitutes in Burma are called by a number of different terms. They are called ပြည့်တံဆာ (lit. "fulfilling the rod's hunger") and အပြာမယ် (lit. "blue mistress", with "blue" being a reference to pornography). In slang usage, ကြက်မ ("chicken"), ဖါမ ("female pimp"), နတ်သမီး ("female nat"), and ညမွှေးပန်း ("fragrant flowers of the night") are also used.

== Legal situation ==
Prostitution is illegal. Under the Suppression of Prostitution Act, enacted in 1949, the act of soliciting or seducing in public is illegal, as is forcing or enticing women into prostitution or owning brothels. The Act also criminalises making financial gain from prostitution, including the sex worker's own earnings.

Condoms were previously used as evidence of prostitution, but an administrative order was issued in 2011 to prevent condoms from being used as evidence. This was subsequently incorporated in section 271 of the Penal Code.

The Penal Code guarantees protection of female children from sexual abuse, with any person found having sexual intercourse with a girl under 14 years (with or without consent) charged with rape. The Child Law, enacted in 1993, raised the age of consent to 16 and made prostitution of children illegal. It is an offence to knowingly allow a girl younger than sixteen years of age under one's guardianship to engage in prostitution. There is no obvious corresponding offence for boys. The Child Law also makes it a punishable offence to use children in the creation of pornographic materials.

Sex workers are often placed in detention centres prior to being charged. Work, such as sewing clothes, is compulsory. Some are subsequently released without charge.

In 2013, MP Daw Sandar Min called for prostitution to be decriminalised but this was rejected by the government.

Currently (2018), the Ministry of Social Welfare, Relief and Resettlement is working on amendments to the law to protect sex workers.

== History ==
=== Konbaung dynasty ===
Prostitution was banned in 1785, during the reign of King Bodawpaya in the early Konbaung dynasty period.

When King Mindon Min founded Mandalay in the 1850s, a separate administrative quarter for prostitutes was included.

=== British rule ===
From the British occupation until 1937, Burma was part of colonial India.

The British sought to regulate prostitution as a matter of accepting a necessary evil. The Cantonment Acts regulated and structured prostitution in the British military bases. The structuring features of the Cantonment Acts provided for about twelve to fifteen Indian women for each regiment of British soldiers. Each regiment contained about a thousand soldiers. These women were kept in brothels called chaklas. They were licensed by military officials and were allowed to consort with soldiers only. Most of the women came from poor families and had no other opportunities for social or economic independence. The structural inequalities that pushed women into prostitution were often enforced by the colonial governments.

Furthermore, the Cantonment Act of 1864 provided for the establishment and extension of hospitals in cantonments. Women working in chaklas were often required to undergo medical examinations once a week, in order to examine them for traces of venereal diseases. Prostitutes were often confined against their wills in these prison hospitals, especially if they were found to have a venereal disease. The Cantonment Act of 1864, originally meant for military bases, was eventually extended to the Presidencies and Provinces of British India. However, when military personnel were increasingly struck down by venereal diseases, more regulations were demanded. This eventually led to the Indian Contagious Disease Acts.

The Contagious Disease Acts sought to prevent venereal diseases in military personnel through several regulations. The Acts required the registration of women engaged in prostitution. These women were often required to carry a license in the form of a card. Furthermore, it mandated the regular medical examination of female prostitutes. If any of these women were found to be infected during an examination, they were required to undergo in-patient treatment. If they refused such treatment, they could be penalized by imprisonment. Once cured of their diseases, they were released. None of these measures was applied to infected men. The Acts only targeted female prostitutes, as they were the only people subject to licensing and medical examinations.

The Great Depression in the 1930s caused unprecedented unemployment and displacement in British Burma, forcing many women to serve clients, mainly British troops and Indian sepoys. According to some accounts, Burma had the largest thriving prostitution industry in British India because of the economic crisis.

== HIV/AIDS ==
Burma has the second highest HIV prevalence rate in Asia, after Thailand. Sex workers are particularly at risk. The criminal nature of sex work in Burma, as it is prohibited by the 1949 Suppression of Prostitution Act, also contributes to the ineffectiveness of reaching out to sex workers in Myanmar with regard to HIV/AIDS awareness and condom usage. In 2005 in Yangon, there were over 100 brothels and up to 10,000 sex workers, mostly of the Bamar ethnic group, with between 70-90 percent having a history of sexually transmitted infections and less than 25 percent having been tested for HIV. An anecdotal study at that time found that nearly half of sex workers in Yangon had HIV/AIDS.

Various campaigns have taken place by the government, NGO, and international organisation to raise awareness of HIV, to give greater access to healthcare and improve treatment of those infected. As a result, the national adult prevalence rate has fallen to 0.4% The prevalence rate amongst sex workers has also fallen: 18.4% in 2008, 7.1% in 2012 and 5.4% in 2016. Condom use amongst sex worker has increased to over 80%.

== Sex trafficking ==
Myanmar is a source country for women and children subjected to sex trafficking, both in Myanmar and abroad. It is also increasingly a destination and transit country for foreign victims, including women and girls from India. Some Myanmar women and children who migrate for work abroad, particularly to Thailand and China, as well as other countries in Asia, the Middle East, and the United States, are subjected to sex trafficking. Myanmar women are increasingly transported to China and subjected to sex trafficking; Myanmar government officials are occasionally complicit in this form of trafficking, as well as in the facilitation of the smuggling and exploitation of Rohingya migrants.

Myanmar is a major source of prostitutes (an estimate of 25,000–30,000) in Thailand, with the majority of women trafficked taken to Ranong, bordering south Myanmar, and Mae Sai, at the eastern tip of Myanmar. Myanmar sex workers also operate in Yunnan, China, particularly the border town of Ruili. The majority of Burmese prostitutes in Thailand are from ethnic minorities. Sixty percent of Burmese prostitutes are under 18 years of age.

The United States Department of State Office to Monitor and Combat Trafficking in Persons ranks Myanmar as a 'Tier 3' country.
