= Myanmar Eye Care Project =

The Myanmar Eye Care Project (MECP) is focused on improving the delivery of critical eye care services to at-risk populations in Myanmar. Founded in 2002 and staffed entirely by ophthalmologists, it aims to end blindness in Myanmar. Myanmar is one of the poorest countries in Southeast Asia and has the highest rate of blindness in the world. Working with partners and a network of providers, MECP operates clinics that provide routine eye care, acute treatment, and surgeries to Myanmar's poor rural populations. MECP also builds eye care infrastructure in rural communities, trains indigenous physicians and nursing staff, and provides equipment.

== History ==
In early 2002, a resident of Sydney, Australia, and former refugee from Myanmar, asked Sydney-based ophthalmologist Geoffrey Cohn OAM to consider setting up an eye care project in Myanmar. Cohn had previously worked pro bono in Bali, in the development of eye care projects in Indonesia in 1989 with Yayasan Kemanusiaan Indonesia (also known as the John Fawcett Foundation), in Papua New Guinea from 1993 to 2001 for the Church Medical Council of Papua New Guinea, and in Cambodia from 1998 to 1999 with HelpAge International.

With the support of U Lakkhana, Chief Abbot of the Kyaswa Monastery, and with the help of local project co-coordinators, members of the monastery community and many volunteers, MECP began treating patients in The Wachet Jivitadana Sangha Hospital by late 2002.

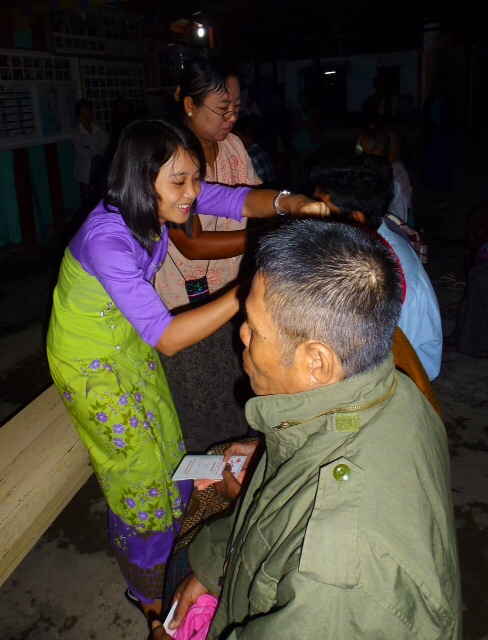
A doctor examining patients on the morning following surgery

Following this, a second project was established in a monastery hospital on the slopes of Mount Popa in 2003. The current national project co-ordinator and project developer of MECP for the past ten years, Daw Phyu Sinn Mon, initially trained as an ophthalmic technician at the Mount Popa-Taung-Kalat centre in 2003.

At the request of U Nayaka, Chief Abbot of Phaung Daw Oo Monastery, another eye care project was started within his monastery at the foot of Mandalay Hills in 2004. In the following years, the service consulted with hundreds of thousands of outpatients, performed tens of thousands of free or low cost eye operations and trained many mid-level ophthalmic technicians (MLOT). The project has continued to grow with the help of donations and visiting teams of eye surgeons, technicians and support staff from Australia, New Zealand, Great Britain, Nepal, and the United States of America.

The project has also been responsible for the introduction of subspecialty training of local ophthalmologists in vitreoretinal surgery, glaucoma and corneal specialties. In 2010, Sydney-based vitreoretinal surgeon Dr H. Kwon Kang introduced vitreoretinal surgery teaching and services to The Wachet Jivitadana Sangha Hospital. In 2015, Prof. Gerard Sutton (Professor of Corneal and Refractive Surgery) and a team from the New South Wales Lions Eye Bank worked with Prof. Daw Yee Yee Aung (Professor of Ophthalmology, Mandalay Eye and Ear Hospital) to establish the Mandalay Eye Bank. From 2014 to 2016, paediatric ophthalmologist and academic Dr Judith Newman has also assisted Mandalay Eye and Ear Hospital in training paediatric ophthalmology.

== Ongoing projects ==
As of December 2017, the MECP has contributed to eleven projects, nine of which are currently running throughout Myanmar. Several outreach projects and charity programs are also being supported by MECP. The MECP aims to provide cataract operations either free of cost or at significantly reduced cost and also aims that all visiting ophthalmologists have some university-affiliated teaching experience.

=== Eye service at the Wachet Jivitadana Sangha Hospital ===
This service was the original pilot project and continues to function as the principal teaching centre. It is one hour southwest of Mandalay.

=== Mandalay Eye Bank ===
Responsibility was handed to the MECP and Mandalay Eye and Ear Hospital by former Minister for Health, Prof. Pe The Khin. The Eye Bank serves as a repository for donated corneas, which may be stored and transplanted into patients with severe corneal disease. The MECP has facilitated technical training (from Sydney Eye Bank Technician Raj Devashayam) to harvest, assess and store corneas as well as surgical training (from Prof. Gerard Sutton) to perform and optimize corneal transplantation.

=== Phaung Daw Oo Monastery, Mandalay ===
Commencing in 2003, the MECP has provided equipment for the Eye service, trained many ophthalmic technicians and has recruited two Mandalay surgeons to serve this centre. The centre has become largely self-sufficient with MECP input needed only for equipment maintenance and replacement.

=== Yangon Jivitadana Sangha Hospital ===
The centre dates initiatives back to the 1940s; however, the eye service commenced in 2012. The MECP has provided equipment and support, which allows more than twenty Yangon eye surgeons to operate in their spare time. MECP sponsors approximately 3,000 free cataract operations per year.

=== North Okkalapa General Hospital ===
The MECP has significantly contributed to the surgical resident teaching program at the North Okkalapa General Hospital. This includes funding for teaching, teaching accessories, operating microscopes, lasers and other equipment. The centre now performs up to 2,400 free or subsidised cataract operations per year and provides training for ophthalmologists in residency.

=== Thiri Dagon Monastery ===
Located in Northeast Yangon in a highly flood-prone area, the MECP provides ophthalmic technicians and has facilitated two volunteer surgeons to service the area. The centre performs 1,500 free or subsidised cataract operations per year.

=== Phyar Pone ===
In the wake of Cyclone Nargis in 2008, the MECP initially established two eye services, which merged into one to serve the people of the Ayeyarwady Region. The service employs ophthalmic technicians and ophthalmologists to perform 1,200 cataract operations per year.

=== Mandalay Eye and Ear Hospital ===
The MECP facilitated the donation of 1000 cataract operations in 2013, as well as the donation of specialist equipment. The MECP also provides ongoing support and teaching as required.

=== Hmawbi Monastery ===
Requested by U Say Keinda, Chief Abbot of Hmawbi Monastery, the MECP established the service and has employed ophthalmic technicians, provided equipment and arranged for visiting ophthalmologists to service the area. The centre is now independent of MECP.

=== Htee Saung Eye Hospital ===
Serving as the principle training and development centre for ophthalmic technicians for the MECP, the hospital is one of the largest service under the governance of the MECP.

In March 2024, Myanmar Eye Care Project projects reached the milestone of 500,000 free eye operations. The largest number has been performed at Shwe Yatu Tipitaka Cakkhu Pala Eye Hospital, Htee Saung under the auspices of Sayadaw U Wunthe Pala Linkara.

Shwe Yatu Tipitaka Cakkhu Pala Eye Hospital, Htee Saung, was created by Daw Phyu Sinn Mon, Honorary Project Manager and Developer of the Myanmar Eye Care Project, at the request of Sayadaw U Wunthe Pala Linkara. It is strategically located at a bus junction. This makes the service accessible to the mass of impoverished and needy people of the Arid Zone.

Satellite services in other regions have developed to be serviced by the teams from Shwe Yatu Tipitaka Cakkhu Pala Eye Hospital, Htee Saung, ultimately to provide sight-restoration independently.

=== Pyin Cee Monastery Eye Hospital ===
Created in 2015, the MECP has provided equipment for the centre, trained ophthalmic technicians and has currently recruited one surgeon to serve this centre. The centre performs approximately 2,000 cataract operations per year.
