= Ministry of Health (Myanmar) =

Government ministry of Myanmar

- ကျန်းမာရေးဝန်ကြီးဌာန

Agency overview
- Formed: 1947; 79 years ago; 1 August 2021; 5 years ago
- Preceding agency: Health Department
- Dissolved: 25 May 2016; 10 years ago
- Superseding agency: Ministry of Health and Sports (Myanmar)
- Jurisdiction: Myanmar
- Headquarters: Office No (4), Naypyidaw
- Annual budget: US$ 18 million (2003)
- Minister responsible: Dr Thet Khaing Win
- Child agencies: Department of Public Health; Department of Medical Services; Department of Health Professional Resources Development and Management; Department of Traditional Medicine; Department of Medical Research; Department of Food and Drug Administration
- Website: www.mohs.gov.mm

The Ministry of Health (Burmese: ကျန်းမာရေးဝန်ကြီးဌာန, Burmese pronunciation: [tɕáɰ̃màjé wʊ̀ɰ̃dʑí tʰàna̰]; abbreviated MOH) is a national government-run ministry administering health affairs and health care in Myanmar, including all of the medical schools. In 2016, President Htin Kyaw dissolved the Ministry of Sports (Myanmar) and organized it under the Ministry of Health, which was renamed as Ministry of Health and Sports (Myanmar) on 25 May 2016.

On 1 August 2021, the SAC reconstituted the Ministry of Health and Sports as Ministry of Health and Ministry of Sports and Youth Affairs.

== Departments ==
The Ministry of Health is divided into departments, each headed by a Director-General.

- Department of Public Health
- Department of Medical Services
- Department of Health Professional Resources Development and Management
- Department of Medical Research
- Department of Traditional Medicine
- Department of Food and Drug Administration
- Department of Sports and Physical Education

Department of Health Professional Resources Development and Management is the controlling body of the following universities in 2014.

- University of Medicine 1, Yangon
- University of Medicine 2, Yangon
- University of Medicine, Mandalay
- University of Medicine, Magway
- University of Medicine, Taunggyi
- University of Dental Medicine, Yangon
- University of Dental Medicine, Mandalay
- University of Pharmacy, Yangon
- University of Pharmacy, Mandalay
- University of Medical Technology, Yangon
- University of Medical Technology, Mandalay
- University of Public Health, Yangon
- University of Community Health, Magway
- University of Nursing, Yangon
- University of Nursing, Mandalay
- University of Traditional Medicine, Mandalay

== List of heads ==
=== Pre–Independence ===
- Hla Min (1943–45)
- Ba Gyan (1945–47)

=== AFPFL Government ===
- Aung Zan Wai
- Khin Maung Lat
- Sein Ban, Dr
- Ba Saw
- Hla Min

=== Caretaker Government ===
- Tun Tin (1958–60)

=== Pyidaungsu Party Government ===
- Sultan Mahmud (1960–62)

=== Revolutionary Council Government ===
- Than Pe, Commodore (1962)
- Hla Han, Col. (1964–74)

=== Burma Socialist Programme Party Government ===
- Hla Han, Col. (1974)
- Kyi Maung (1974–78)
- Win Maung (1978–81)
- Tun Wai (1981–88)

=== State Law and Order Restoration Council Government ===
- Pe Thein, Col. (1988–93)
- Than Nyunt, Vice-Adm. (1993–96)
- Saw Tun (1996–97)

=== State Peace and Development Council Government ===
- Kat Sein, Maj-Gen. (November 1997–November 2003)
- Kyaw Myint, Dr. (November 2003–March 2011)

=== Thein Sein 's Government ===
- Pe Thet Khin, Dr. (March 2011 – July 2014)
- Than Aung, Dr. (August 2014 – 30 March 2016)

=== Htin Kyaw 's Government ===
- Myint Htwe, Dr. (30 March 2016 – 2018)

=== Win Myint 's Government ===
- Myint Htwe, Dr. (2018 – 1 February 2021)

=== Min Aung Hlaing Military 's Government ===
- Thet Khaing Win, Dr. (1 February 2021 – present)

== See also ==
- Health in Myanmar
- HIV/AIDS in Myanmar
- Ministry of Sports (Myanmar)
- Ministry of Health and Sports (Myanmar)
