= Pe Thet Khin =

- ဖေသက်ခင်

Minister for Health of Myanmar
- In office 30 March 2011 – 29 July 2014
- Preceded by: Kyaw Myint
- Succeeded by: Than Aung

Rector of the University of Medicine-1, Yangon
- Succeeded by: Than Cho

Personal details
- Born: Burma
- Occupation: Paediatrician

Pe Thet Khin (Burmese: ဖေသက်ခင်) was the Minister for Health of Myanmar (Burma), and a practicing paediatrician. He previously served as Professor of Child Health in University of Medicine, Mandalay. Later he served as the rector of the University of Medicine-1, Yangon. In 2011, he became the Minister of Health in Thein Sein's government. But he resigned on 29 July 2014.

== Publications ==
Bringing Health Research to the Renewed U.S.-Myanmar Relationship, June 2012, Science & Diplomacy
