= University of Medicine 1, Yangon =

Medical University in Myanmar

Coordinates: 16°49′9″N 96°8′2″E

- ဆေးတက္ကသိုလ်(၁) ရန်ကုန်
- Former names: Institute of Medicine 1 (IM-1), Medical College 1 (MC-1)
- Motto: ဥပဌာနံ၊ အနုကမ္မာ၊ ဒယာ (Pali: upaṭhānaṃ, anukammā, dayā)
- Motto in English: Service, Sympathy, Humanity
- Type: Public
- Established: 2 February 1927; 99 years ago
- Affiliations: Ministry of Health
- Rector: Dr. Kyaw Shwe
- Faculty: 685
- Students: 2969 (2002–2003)
- Undergraduates: 3000
- Postgraduates: 500
- Location: Yangon, Yangon Region, Myanmar
- Campus: #Lanmadaw (Main); 1. Pyay Road; 2. Thahton Road
- Colors: Red, Black, White, Yellow
- Website: www.um1yangon.edu.mm

Yangon City Landmark

The University of Medicine 1, Yangon (Burmese: ဆေးတက္ကသိုလ်(၁) ရန်ကုန် [sʰé tɛʔkəθò tɪʔ (jàɰ̃ɡòʊɰ̃)]; formerly the Institute of Medicine 1), located in Yangon, is the oldest medical school in Myanmar. The university offers M.B.B.S. degrees and graduate (diploma, master's and doctoral) degrees in medical science. The university is perhaps the most selective university in the country, and admits approximately 400 students annually based on their University Entrance Examination scores.

The University of Medicine 1 comprises three campuses: Lanmadaw campus (also known as St. John's), Pyay Road campus (also known as Leikkhon) and Thaton Road campus (former BOC College of Engineering and Mining).

University of Medicine 1, Yangon is one of five schools in Myanmar recognized by the Educational Commission for Foreign Medical Graduates.

== History ==
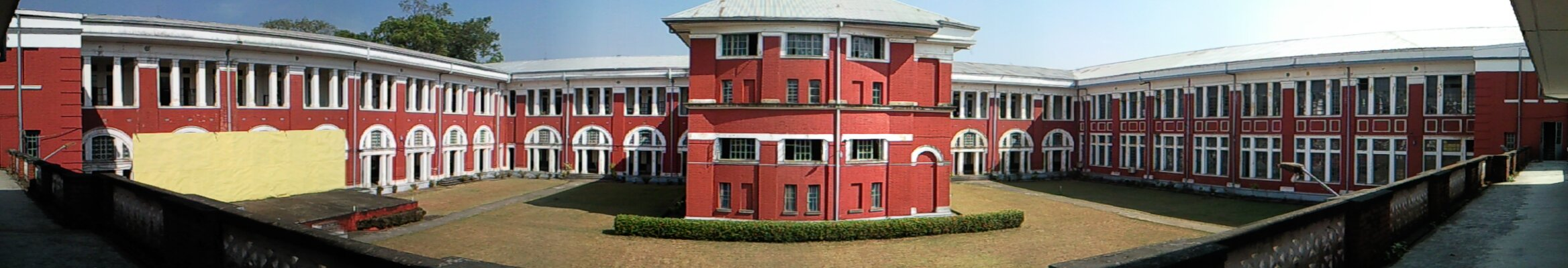
Panorama view of Lanmadaw Campus

=== Beginnings ===
The history of the University of Medicine 1 began with the establishment of the government medical schools in Myanmar in 1907 at the premises of the old Rangoon General Hospital, and the introduction of a course in medical sciences. It was a four-year medical course known as Licentiate Medical Practice (LMP) course and the successful candidates were offered certificate of license for medical practice. In 1923–1924, the Bachelor of Medicine and Bachelor of Surgery (M.B., B.S.) course was introduced at the old Rangoon College building at the site of the present Neurology Department of the Yangon General Hospital. Then, the main building of the University of Medicine 1 was built and the foundation stone was laid by Sir Harcourt Butler on 2 February 1927. The classes were transferred to the new building in 1929.

The medical college became a constituent college of the Rangoon University in 1930 and was placed under the Board of Administration, on which the Vice-chancellor of the University of Rangoon and the Inspector General of Civil Hospital served as chairman and vice-chairman respectively. Academic matters and general administration were attended to by the principal with the help of the Medical College Council(Academic Body).

In 1937, the medical degree, M.B., B.S. (Rgn), conferred by the University of Rangoon gained recognition of the General Medical Council of Great Britain. From 1942 to 1945, during World War II, there was a temporary suspension of the M.B., B.S. course. A modified course was conducted instead, on the successful completion of which the Licentiate of the State Medical Board (L.S.M.B.) was conferred. Although the medical college building remained intact, all the laboratory equipment, and all the mounts and specimens collected in the Pathology and Forensic Medicine Department Museums were completely destroyed, and valuable books from the college library were also lost.

After the war, all the constituent colleges of the reconstituted Rangoon University became Faculties, and the Medical College became the Faculty of Medicine, under the administration of the Dean.

=== Post-independence era ===
Mosaic Walls at the corner of stairways inside the Pyay Road Campus

On the promulgation of the University Education Act in May 1964, the Institutes of Medicine were established.

In 1961, the Institute of Medicine 1 moved into its Prome Road campus, which had formerly been occupied by the Institute of Technology. The complex was designed by Raglan Squire and had been built between 1954 and 1956.

In 1973, the administration of the three medical Institutes and the Institute of Dental Medicine was transferred to the Ministry of Health, and came under the direct control of the Department of Medical Education, now known as the Department of Health Manpower.

Post-graduate courses were introduced at the three Institutes of Medicine in 1964, the Dean of the courses being responsible to the Rector for their organization and administration. With the addition of new courses in 1970, the Board of Postgraduate Medical Studies came under the administration of the Director. With the institution of the Department of Medical Education in 1973, the Board has been under the direct charge of the Director-General of the Department of Medical Education, now known as the Department of Human Resource for Health. In 2005, Institute of Medicine 1 was renamed the University of Medicine 1.

== Leadership ==
From 1930 to 1941, the university became Medical College under University of Rangoon headed by principals, all of whom were Indian Medical Service (IMS) officers.

1. 1930–31: Lt. Col. T.F. Owens
2. 1931–33: Lt. Col. L.A.H. Lack
3. 1933–38: Lt. Col. R.V. Morrison
4. 1938–39: Lt. Col. R.H. Malone
5. 1939–41: Major G.M. Irvine

From 1946 to 1964, the university became the Faculty of Medicine under University of Rangoon headed by Deans.

1. 1946–47: William Burridge
2. 1947–48: Lt. Col. Min Sein
3. 1948–49: Ba Than
4. 1949–51: Min Sein
5. 1951–53: Ba Than
6. 1953–55: Min Sein
7. 1955–57: Ba Than
8. 1957–59: Min Sein
9. 1959–64: Maung Gale

Since 1964, the university has been headed by an academic dean known as a rector. Past rectors have included:

1. 1964–1971: Ba Than
2. 1971–1972: Pe Kyin
3. 1972–1984: Tun Min
4. 1984–1987: Hla Myint
5. 1987–1988: Tin Aung Swe
6. 1988–1991: Maung Maung Sein
7. 1991–1996: Mya Oo
8. 1996–1997: Kyaw Myint Tun
9. 1997–1998: Kyaw Myint
10. 1998–2007: Myo Myint
11. 2007–2009: Aye Maung Han
12. 2009–2011: Pe Thet Khin
13. 2011–2013: Than Cho
14. 2013–2015: Thet Khine Win
15. 2015–2021: Zaw Wai Soe
16. 2021-: Kyaw Shwe

== Coursework ==
The M.B., B.S. course work extends over seven years.

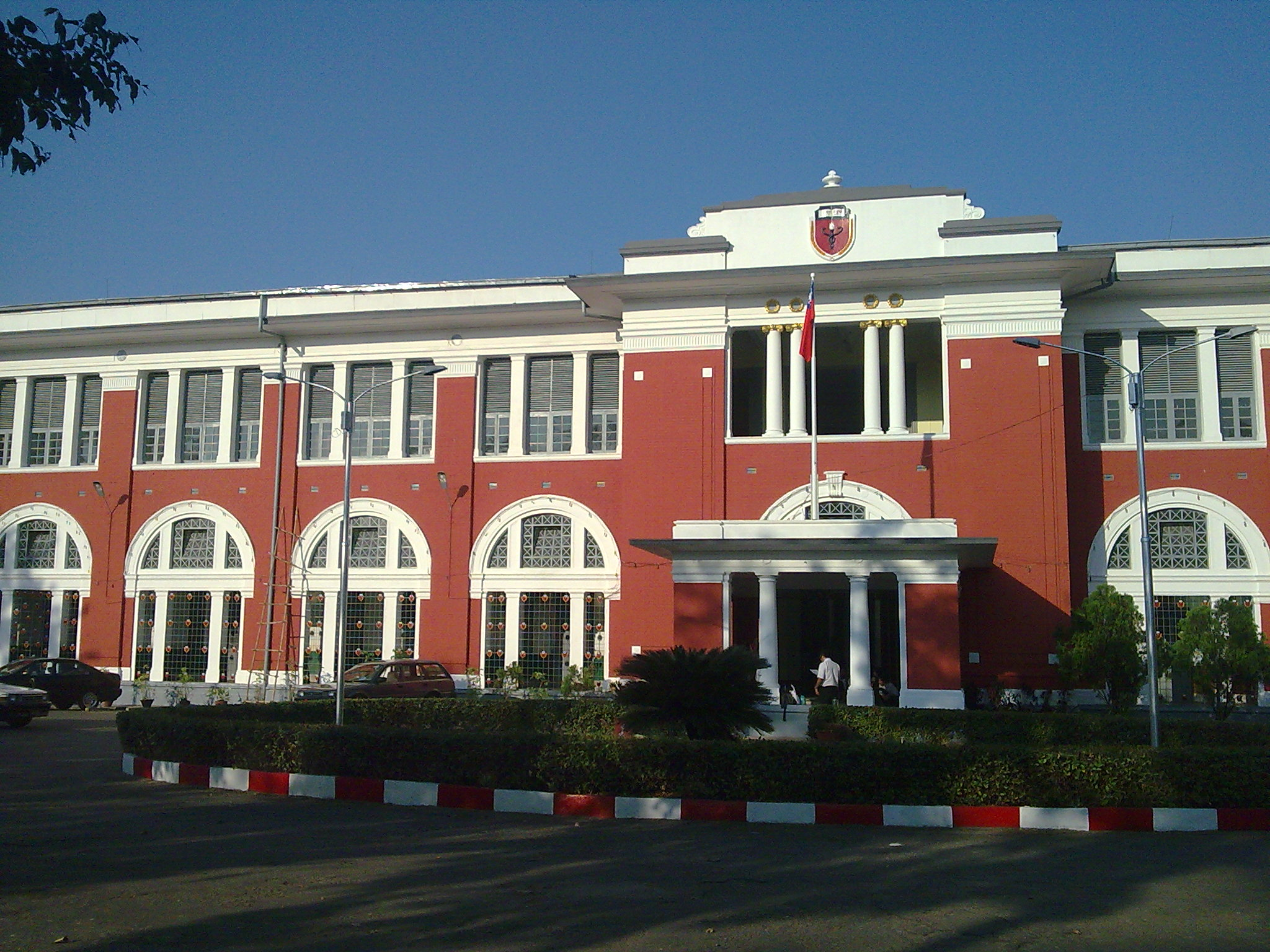
Main Building, Lanmadaw Campus

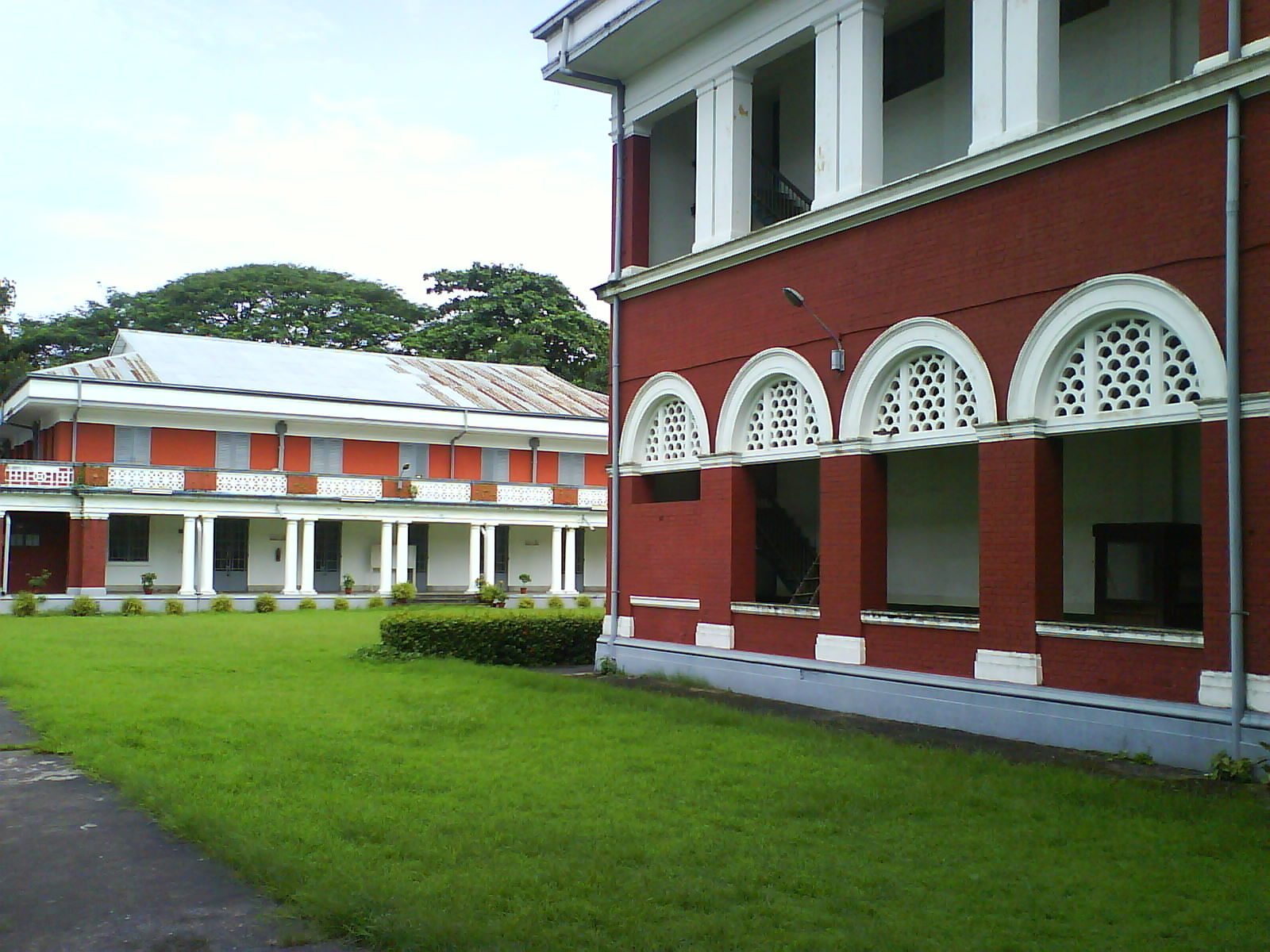
Interior View Of Lanmadaw Campus

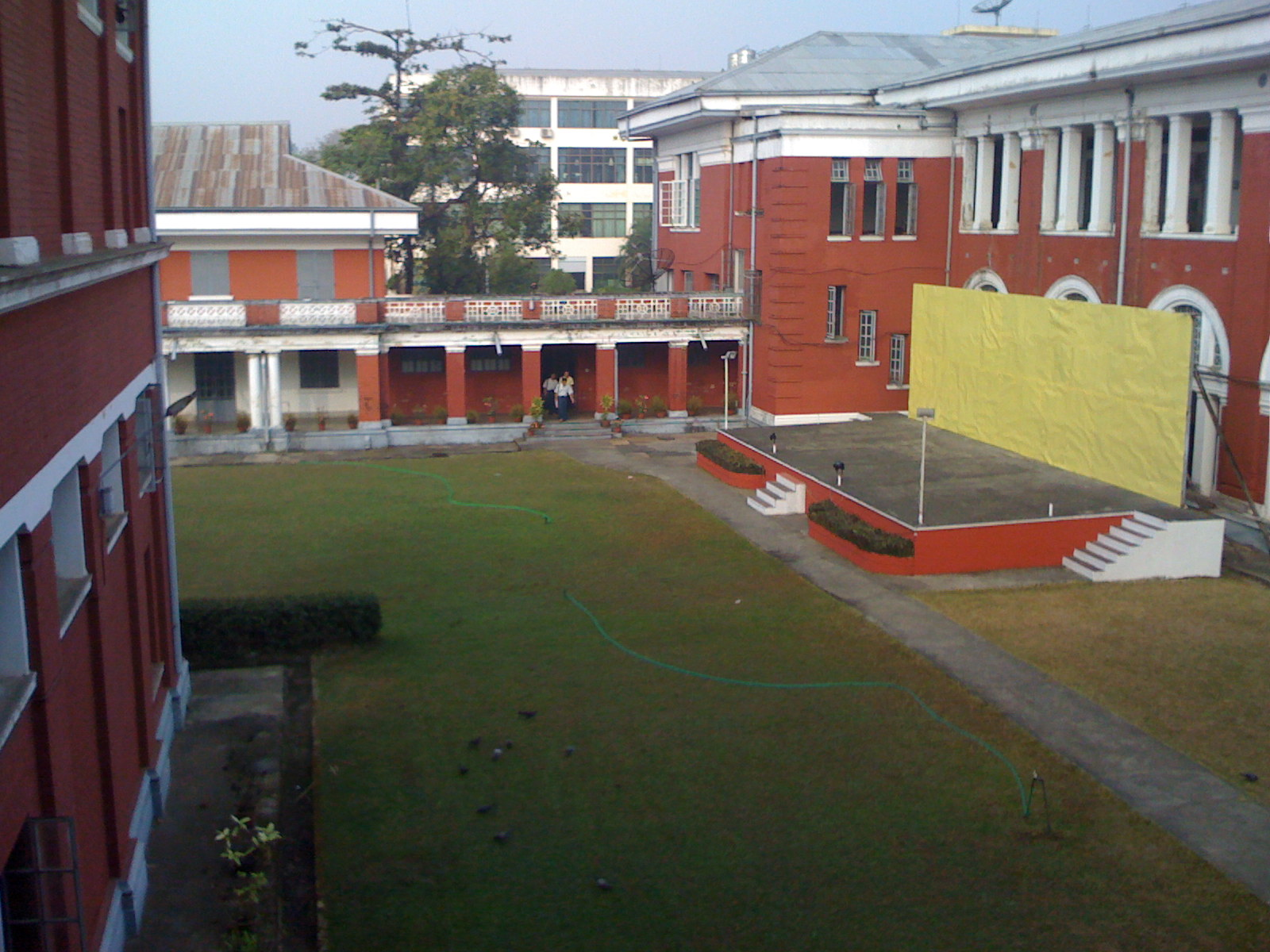
The courtyard where graduation dinners are held

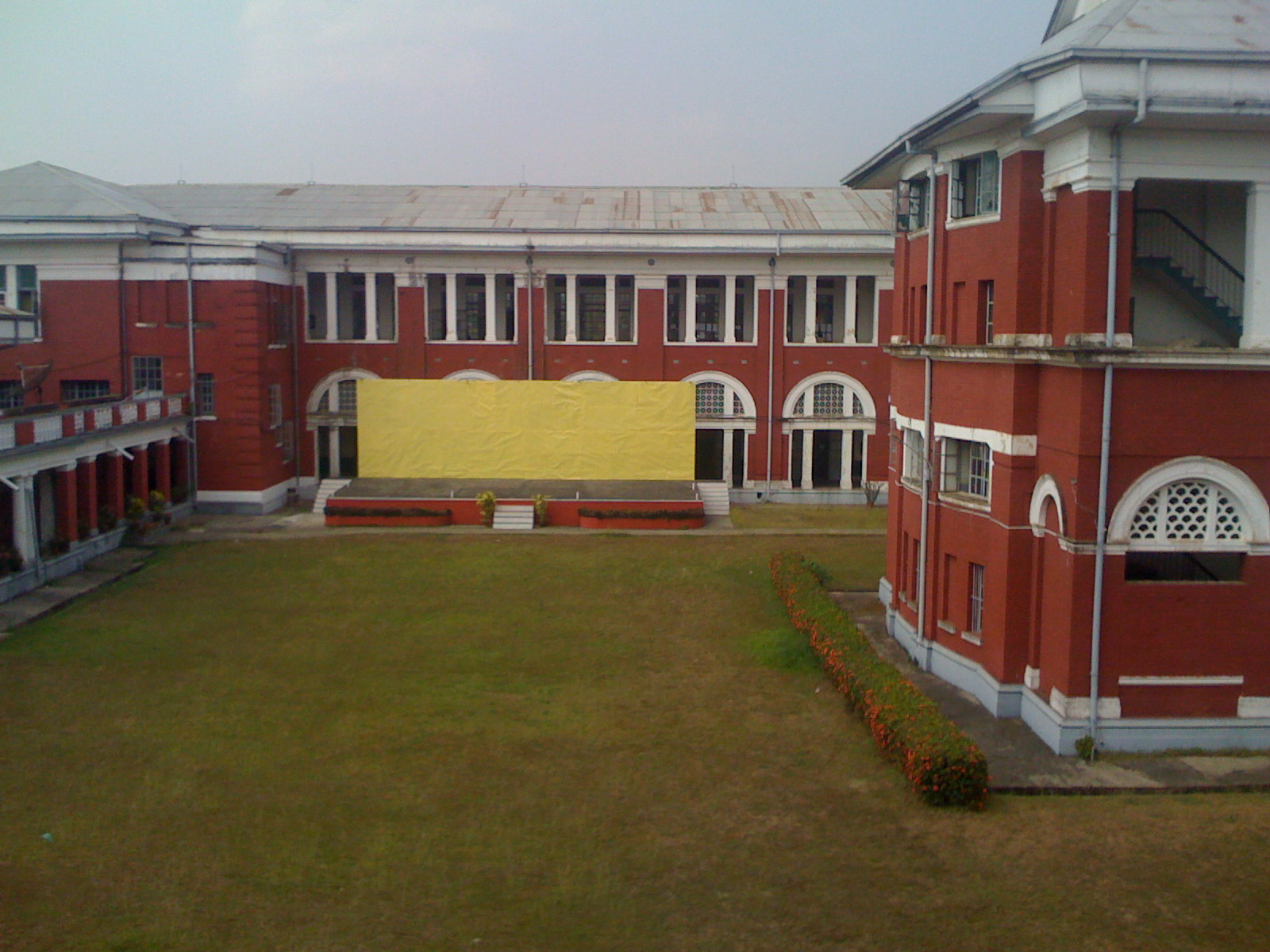
Courtyard Of Lanmadaw Campus

Year	Duration
Foundation year	1 year
Medical first year	1½ years
Medical second year	1 year
Final M.B., B.S. Part I	1 year
Final M.B., B.S. Part II	1½ years
House Surgeon	1 year
Total	7 years

=== Subjects ===
==== Foundation year ====
- Burmese
- English
- Mathematics & statistics
- Physics
- Chemistry
- Botany
- Zoology

==== Medical first year ====
- Anatomy
- Physiology
- Biochemistry

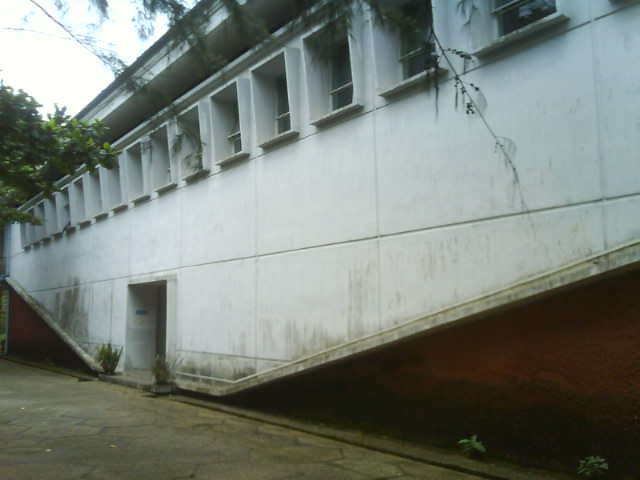
Theatres 1 and 2 of Pyay Campus

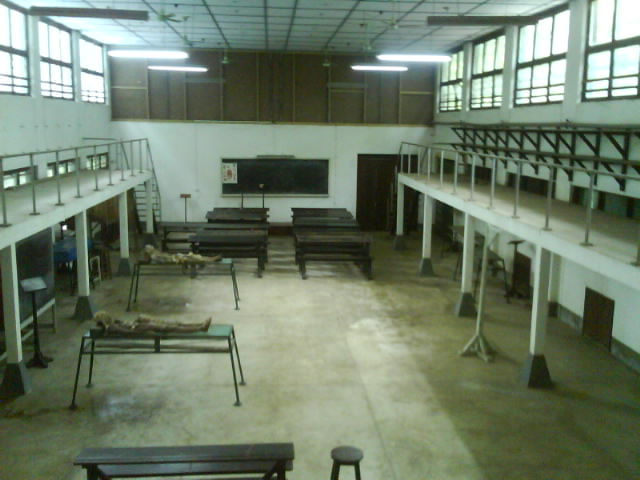
Dissection Room 4 of Anatomy Department

==== Medical second year ====
- General pathology
- Microbiology
- Pharmacology

Students are also posted for 18 weeks each to the medical and surgical wards for clinical training.

==== Final year (Part I) ====
- Forensic Medicine
- Preventive and Social Medicine (with three weeks residential field training in the rural areas).
- Systemic Pathology and Haematology

Students attend lectures and clinics in Medicine, Surgery, Child health, Obstetrics and Gynecology, and are posted to the various teaching hospitals, including Urban Health facilities as part of Preventive and Social Medicine teaching.

==== Final year (Part II) ====
- Child Health
- Medicine
- Obstetrics & Gynaecology
- Surgery

Students study the allied specialties, namely, eye, ear, nose & throat diseases, urology, neurology, tuberculosis, venereal diseases, orthopaedics and traumatology, skin diseases, mental health and psychiatry, orthomaxillo-facial surgery, radiology, radiotherapy, nuclear medicine, anesthesiology, thoracic surgery, and paediatric surgery.

A summative examination is held at the end of the Final M.B., B.S.Part II course. Problem Based Learning (PBL), Community Based Learning (CBL) and Behavioural Science will be incorporated, as relevant, in the M.B., B.S. course.

==== House surgeon training ====
All students, after successful completion of Final Part II examination, are continued to train hands-on for period of one year as house surgeons in the recognized Teaching Hospitals in Yangon and / or the State and Division Hospitals. Training Periods are as following: -

Subject	Duration
Child Health	2 ½ months
Community Medicine	2 weeks
Medicine (including Psychiatry)	3 months
Obstetrics & Gynaecology	3 months
Surgery(including Traumatology)	3 months

- Only after completion of house-surgeonship M.B., B.S. Degree is offered to the students. Before 1997, the degree was conferred upon completion of the second part of the final year.

=== Improvements and changes ===
M.B., B.S. COURSE (1930)

Yangon University passed a new curriculum for M.B., B.S. degree course with a slight alteration in program structure of 1923 curriculum. There was no change in 1st M.B., course. The teaching of Physical and Organic chemistry in second M.B. course was shortened to six months.

The 3rd M.B., B.S. course was of one-year duration and consisted of:

1. Materia medica and Pharmacology
2. General and Special Pathology including Medical Zoology and Bacteriology
3. Morbid Anatomy including attendance to all post-mortem examination for three months.
4. Morbid Histology
5. Elementary Bacteriology and Medical Zoology
6. Clinical clerkship

The final M.B., B.S. course was two years and it was divided into two parts (The Final Part I and the Final Part II M.B., B.S.): The subjects taught in the Final Part I course were:

1. Forensic Medicine (including medico-legal post-mortem examination)
2. Hygiene and vaccination (including Practical Hygiene).

The examination was held at the end of one year.

The course leading to Part II of the final M.B., B.S. examination was as follows:

1. Systemic Medicine
2. Systemic Surgery
3. Systemic Midwifery
4. Applied anatomy and physiology
5. Outpatient clerkship - 4 months
6. Special Departments

Three months - Eye, Ear, Nose and Throat Two months - Venereal Diseases & Skin

1. Maternity Hospital - 3 months
2. Clinical clerkship in medicine & Surgery

To fulfil the regulation of General Medical Council of Great Britain the instructions on child welfare, prenatal care and causes of excessive infantile mortality had to be included.

The candidate who failed in any one of the M.B., B.S. examinations could transfer himself to L.M. & S. course, if desired to do so. But candidates who had passed the L.M. & S. course were not granted any concession to enable them to follow a modified course leading to the degree of M.B., B.S.

The General Medical Council of Great Britain was again requested to reconsider the university's application for the recognition of its M.B., B.S. Degree as registrable qualification in Great Britain. The Committee of the General Medical Council informed the university that it was not expedient or just to accede to the request of the university.

M.B., B.S. COURSE (1935–36)

The prospectus of the Medical College of the University of Rangoon (1935–1936) stated that the duration of M.B., B.S. course was seven years (previously six years) from the time of matriculation - two years of pre-medical and five years of medical studies proper.

A candidate for admission into Medical College, had to pass the First M.B., B.S. course that normally extended over two years or one of the examinations recognized by the General Medical Council of Great Britain as prerequisite education.

There was no change in Second M.B., B.S. course but the subjects taught in clinical years were rearranged as follows:

1. The Third M.B., B.S.
  1. Materia Medica & Pharmacology
  2. Bacteriology & Medical Zoology
2. The Final Part I M.B., B.S.
  1. Pathology
  2. Forensic Medicine
  3. Hygiene and Public health
3. The Final Part II M.B., B.S.
  1. Medicine
  2. Surgery
  3. Obstetrics & Gynaecology

In the previous curriculum, Bacteriology and Medical Zoology were taught under Pathology in Third M.B., B.S. course. The teaching of Pathology was carried out in the Final Part I in 1935-36 curriculum.

Some of the rules for the students stated that the students who were absent without leave would be removed from the college and no student would be allowed to sit for a University Examination unless his attendance, work and conduct had been certified to be satisfactory by the Professor or Lecturer in each subject for which the student was appearing for the examination.

During the three years of clinical study, (i.e. starting from Third M.B., B.S.) the students had to work in the outpatient departments and the wards of the Rangoon General Hospital, and attend post-mortem examinations, clinics and surgical operations. They performed clinical duties under the supervision of the members of the staff of hospital who were also staff of the Medical College. The students were posted for a period of continuous duty at the Dufferin Hospital for training in Obstetrics and Gynaecology. The course of medical study was planned to conform to the requirements of the General Medical Council of Great Britain.

After passing the Final part II examination one could register as a medical practitioner with the Burma Medical Council. The M.B., B.S. degree was registrable in India and Burma. It was also anticipated that registration in Great Britain could be made in the near future.

The internship was not compulsory but the graduates were strongly recommended to spend a year at least as a House-physician or Surgeon in a well equipped hospital in order to gain experience and confidence in solving the problems that may be encountered in general practice. Only about ten posts were available a year in selected Civil General Hospitals in Burma. They were given an allowance of 75 rupees (75 Myanmar kyats) per month. It is then raised to around 50,000 Myanmar kyats (around US$55) per month in 2011.

The majority of graduates entered the private practice. Few posts were available in the Government Service; the Burma Railways, the Corporation of Rangoon and certain large commercial enterprises such as the Burmah Oil Co., the Irrawaddy Flotilla Co., Burma Corporation, Indo-Burma Petroleum Co. The initial pay ranged from 200 to 400 rupees per month according to the nature of the duties and qualification of the applicants.

Starting from August 2008, UM I has started teaching new medical ethics and patient safety curriculum integrating into first MB to House Surgeon training with total hour of 36 hours.

=== Core contents ===
- At the end of the 1st MB course, the student should be able to:
  - Define and understand ethics, medical ethics, Hippocratic Oath, Declaration of Geneva in Burmese and English versions
  - Be aware of ethical and moral issues in relation to Burmese culture
- At the end of the 2nd MB course, the student should be able to:
  - Choose correct statement regarding respect of dead body and specimen.
  - Choose correct statement regarding research ethics
  - Choose correct statement regarding informed consent
- At the end of the 3rd MB course, the student should be able to:
  - Be aware of biomedical ethics
  - Safely handle infectious agents
  - Describe rational prescribing (NNT, RRR, APR)
  - Prescribe safely
  - Conduct appropriate bedside manner
  - Identify health care errors and their causes
- At the end of the FP I course, the student should be able to describe:
  - code of conduct (medical/ethical)
  - serious medical misconduct
  - medical negligence (civil and criminal)
  - formation and function of MMC
  - professionalism
  - patient safety concepts
  - How to take Consent for post-mortem examination
  - Public health ethics and their importance
  - communication skills concerning specimen collection
  - Ethical principle of respect for the death
- After the end of the Final Part II, the students should be able to:
  - Demonstrate effective and ethical communications skills in patient management
  - Be aware of patient safety concepts & ethical principles in clinical management decision making and ethical dilemmas
- After the end of the internship, the candidates should be able to:
  - Apply patient safety concepts & ethical principles in clinical management decision making and ethical dilemmas

== Notable alumni ==
- U Ba (president physician)
- Col. Than Zin
- Kyi Aye
- Aye Maung Han
- Kyaw Myint (physician)
- Lun Htar Htar
- May Win Myint
- Mya Oo
- Myint Maung Maung
- Myo Myint
- Naga Thein Hlaing
- Nang Mwe San
- Nay Win Maung
- Pe Myint
- Pe Thet Khin
- Sandar Win
- Saung Oo Hlaing
- Sein Myint
- Soe Thu
- Tha Hla Shwe
- Than Nyein
- Tin Shwe
- Phyu Phyu Kyaw Thein
- Myint Htwe
- Sandar Win
- Sujoy B. Roy
- Za Hlei Thang
- S I Padmavati
- Phyo Pyae Sone
- Paing Phyo Thu
- Zaw Lin Htut
- Thant Thaw Kaung

== Gallery ==
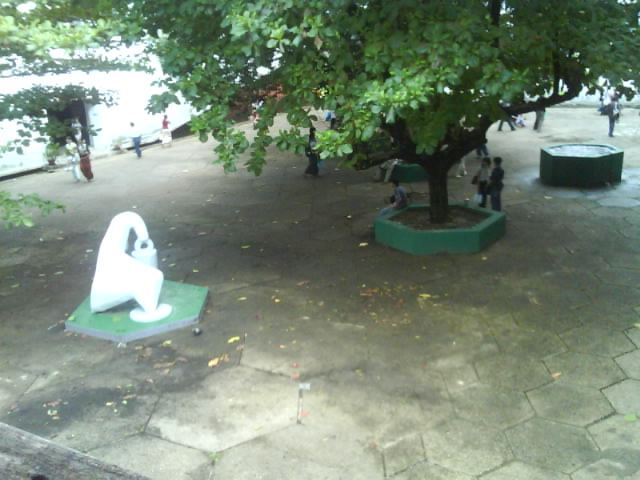
The central courtyard near the lecture theatre 15 and 16

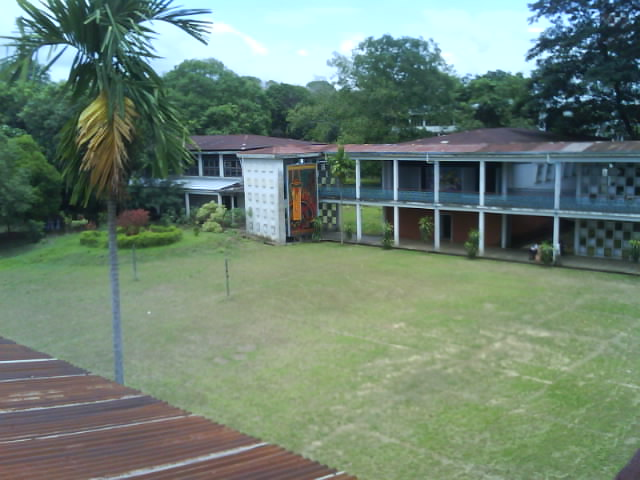
Football ground inside the Pyay Road Campus

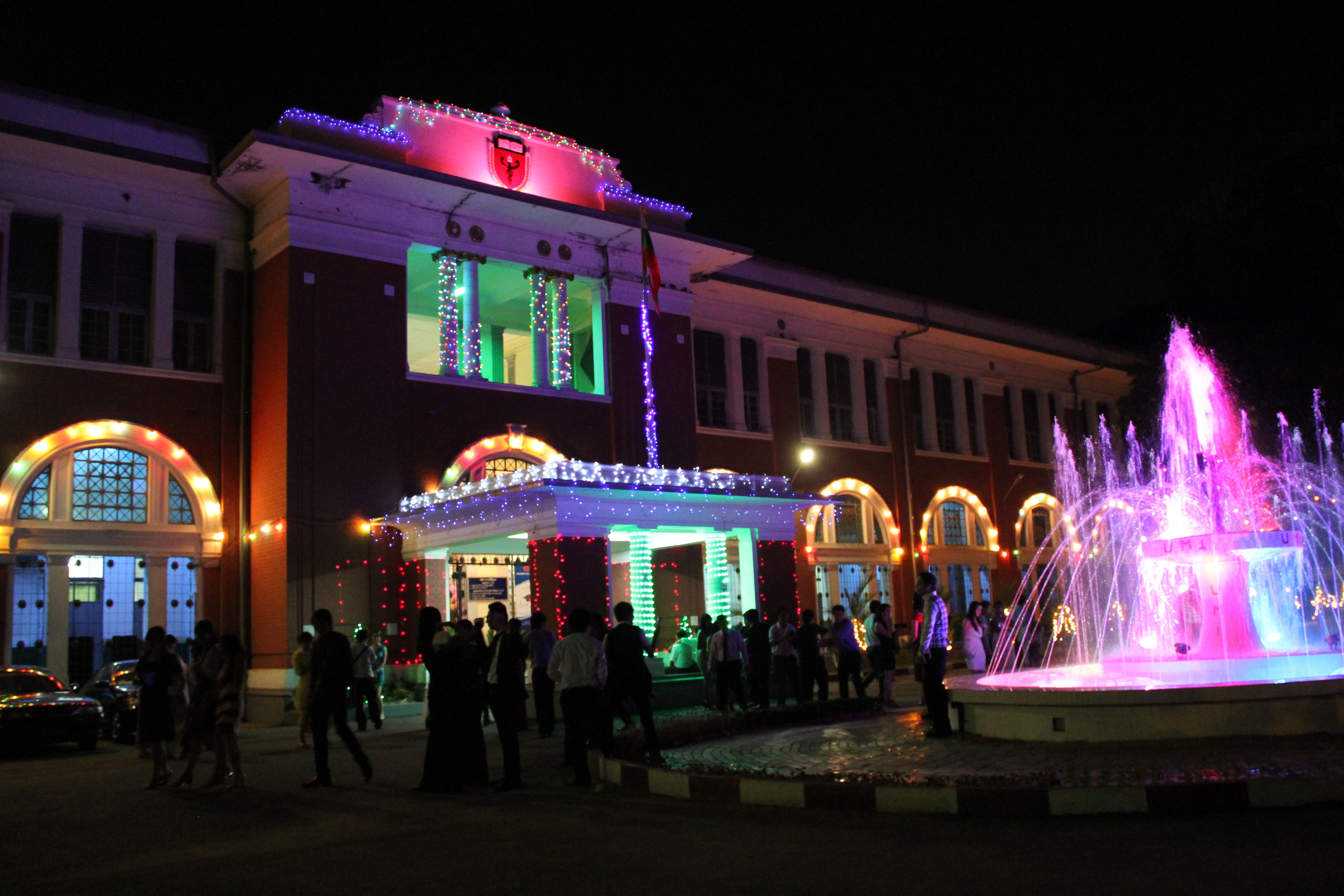
Main building with newly built water-fountain seen in February,2012

Convocation(Graduation Ceremony) of the university

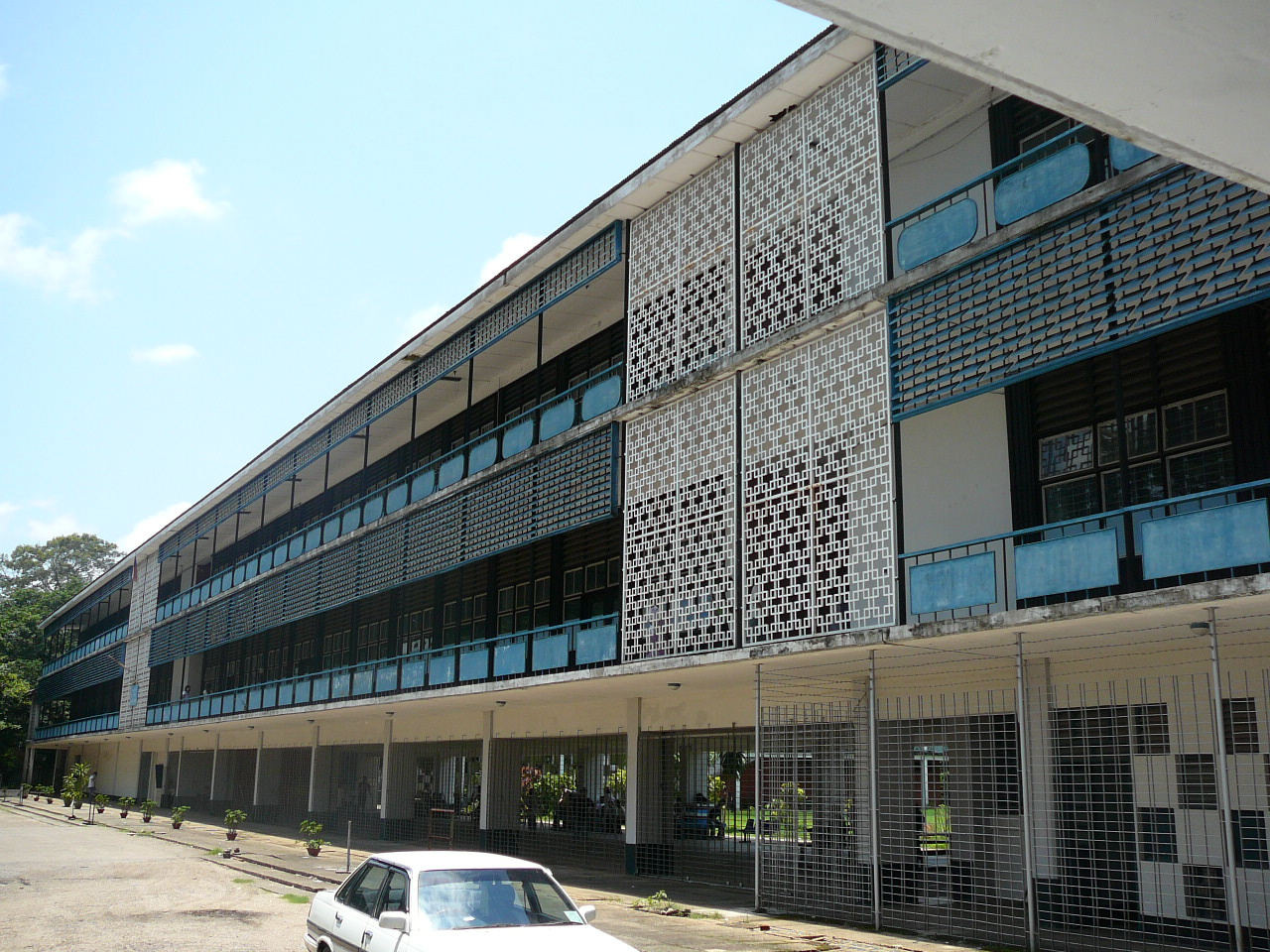
Pyay Road Campus

== See also ==
- List of universities in Myanmar
- Medical Universities (Myanmar)
