= Min Sein =

Burmese physician, educator and administrator

Thiri Pyanchi Min Sein CBE FRCP

2nd, 4th, 6th, 8th Dean of the Faculty of Medicine, Rangoon University
- In office 1957–1959
- Preceded by: Ba Than
- Succeeded by: Maung Gale
- In office 1953–1955
- Preceded by: Ba Than
- Succeeded by: Ba Than
- In office 1949–1951
- Preceded by: Ba Than
- Succeeded by: Ba Than
- In office 1947–1948
- Preceded by: William Burridge
- Succeeded by: Ba Than

Medical Superintendent of Rangoon General Hospital
- In office 1940–1942

Personal details
- Born: Hoe Min Sein; 26 December 1898 Pyapon, Irrawaddy Division, British Burma
- Died: 9 November 1978 (aged 79) Rangoon (Yangon); Rangoon Division, Burma (Myanmar)
- Spouse: Yin May (m. 1936; died 1978)
- Children: Thein Htut; Tin Tin Aye; Mya Thein Han (adopted)
- Parent(s): U Sine Hu and Daw Yin Cane
- Education: University of Calcutta (MB); Royal College of Physicians (FRCP)

Military service
- Allegiance: British Raj (1931–1948); British Burma (1937–1948)
- Branch/service: Indian Medical Service; Burma Medical Service
- Years of service: 1931–1948 (IMS); 1937–1948 (BMS)
- Rank: Major (IMS); Lieutenant Colonel (BMS)

Thiri Pyanchi Min Sein CBE FRCP (Burmese: မင်းစိန်, pronounced [míɰ̃ sèiɰ̃]; formerly, Hoe Min Sein; 26 December 1898 – 9 November 1978) was a Burmese physician, educator and administrator. The first Burmese dean of the Faculty of Medicine of Rangoon University in British Burma, Min Sein was one of the small group of senior physicians that rebuilt and expanded the country's medical education system from the ground up after the country's independence in 1948. He served as the dean of the medical school four times between 1947 and 1959, and led the Burma Medical Research Institute, the Burma Medical Association and the Burma Olympic Committee.

== Early life and education ==
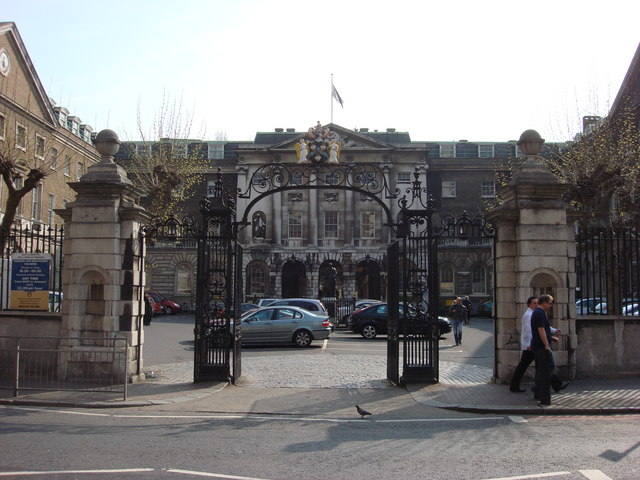
Guy's Hospital in London where Min Sein received training

He was born Hoe Min Sein to landowner parents U Sine Hu and Daw Yin Cane on 26 December 1898 in Pyapon in the Irrawaddy delta in British Burma. He went to high school in Rangoon (Yangon), and studied medicine at the University of Calcutta, and graduated with an MB in 1925. He continued his studies at Guy's Hospital, London from 1927 to 1930, as a clinical assistant to Sir John Conybeare and Sir Charles Symonds. In 1929, he received his MRCP certification from the Royal College of Physicians, and his MRCS from the Royal College of Surgeons of England.

== Career ==
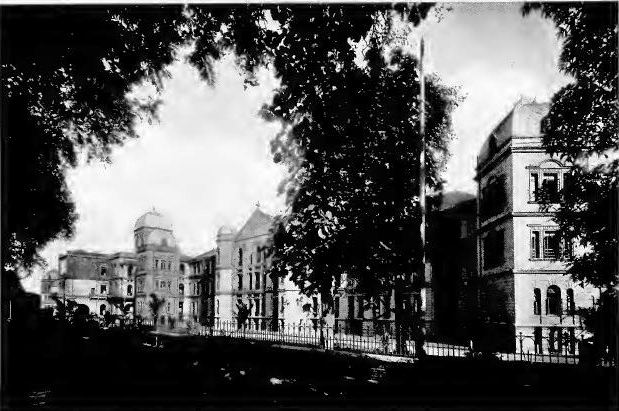
Hoe was head of Rangoon General Hospital (1940–1942)

=== Colonial era ===
Upon return to Burma, Hoe joined the Indian Medical Service, the military medical service of British India on 27 April 1931. He joined the service right before the outbreak of an open rebellion by Burmese peasants hit hard by the Great Depression. He served as a battalion medical officer with the British Forces throughout the rebellion (1931–1932). His rank in 1932 was captain, and he was assigned to work for the government of Burma by the IMS on 26 February 1934. He became a lecturer in medicine at Rangoon Medical College in 1938, a major on 20 July 1939, and the Medical Superintendent (Head) of Rangoon General Hospital in 1940.

His career achievements were significant in colonial Burma. The colonial era medical community was mainly made up of foreign-born physicians and specialists that existed primarily in Rangoon (Yangon). (Note: (Myint Swe 2014: xi–xii): About half of the physicians and most of the specialists at Rangoon General Hospital were foreign born. To see a specialist, everyone in the country needed to go to RGH. The "small medical system was run mainly by foreigners and the tiny elite for foreigners and the tiny elite." (Myint Swe 2014: 134–135): It was exceedingly difficult to get into medical school even in the late colonial period. The class size was disproportionately small for the size of country's population (13.2 million in 1921 and 16.8 million in 1941 (per Saito and Lee 1999: 1)). Between 1922 and 1941, a grand total of 543 students graduated from Rangoon Medical College (RMC), or 27 new graduates on average each year. Of the grand total, the number of indigenous Burmese graduates was only 228 (42%), or less than a dozen per year.) Indeed, in 1942, he was one of the only four Burmese officers (alongside Lt. Col. Henry Aung Khin, Lt. Col. Alfred Ba Thaw and Capt. Shwe Zan) in the Burma Medical Service (BMS), the successor of the IMS in Burma. (To be sure, some highly qualified Burmese physicians like his own wife Yin May or his RGH colleague Ba Than, both of whom were already FRCS surgeons, did not join the IMS. (Note: (Tin Naing Toe 2011): Yin May became the second Burmese woman FRCS in 1929. (Khin Thet-Hta et al 2005: 84): Ba Than received his FRCS in 1932.) Yin May did join the BMS after the war in 1946 as a Lt. Col. to run the Lady Dufferin Maternity Hospital.)

Hoe left Burma with the British administration to India during the Japanese occupation of Burma (1942–1945). He was part of the exodus of medical professionals that evacuated the country along with the British administration. His wife remained in Burma, and ended up founding and running the main maternity hospital in Rangoon throughout the war years. (Hoe, Yin May and their son fled Rangoon in early 1942 to escape the invasion but the family somehow got separated in Upper Burma. He made it to India but his pregnant wife returned to Rangoon alone. (Note: (Maung Wa 2009: 121–122, 213–214): Maj. Min Sein, Yin May and their son Thein Htut were in Mandalay on 25 March 1942. (Maung Wa 2009: 150): Yin May was in Indaw on 17 April 1942 without her family, and Min Sein sent her brother Thein Kyaw to fetch her. (Myint Swe 2014: 98): Yin May gave birth to a baby in late 1942 in Rangoon as a single mother; Min Sein by then was in India.)) He served in the 14th Army from 1942 to 1946 as an Assistant Director, Medical Services (ADMS) and Deputy Director, Medical Services (DDMS).

He returned with the British after the war. When the British restarted Rangoon Medical College as the Faculty of Medicine of Rangoon University in 1946, he became the Professor of Medicine (i.e. Head of the Department). In 1947, Min Sein, as he was known now, became the first ever Burmese dean of the medical school, succeeding the Faculty's first dean Dr. William Burridge. He was awarded the title of OBE by the British government in 1947, and promoted to the rank of Lt. Col. (although he is commonly, if imprecisely, referred to as Col. Min Sein in Burmese publications.) (Note: See (RCP 1954) and (RCP 1957) for his retired rank of Lt. Col. In Myanmar, Min Sein's rank is reported as colonel; see (Khin Thet Hta 2005) or (UM1 Department of Medicine).) Furthermore, he did not quit the IMS until 1948.

=== Post-independence ===
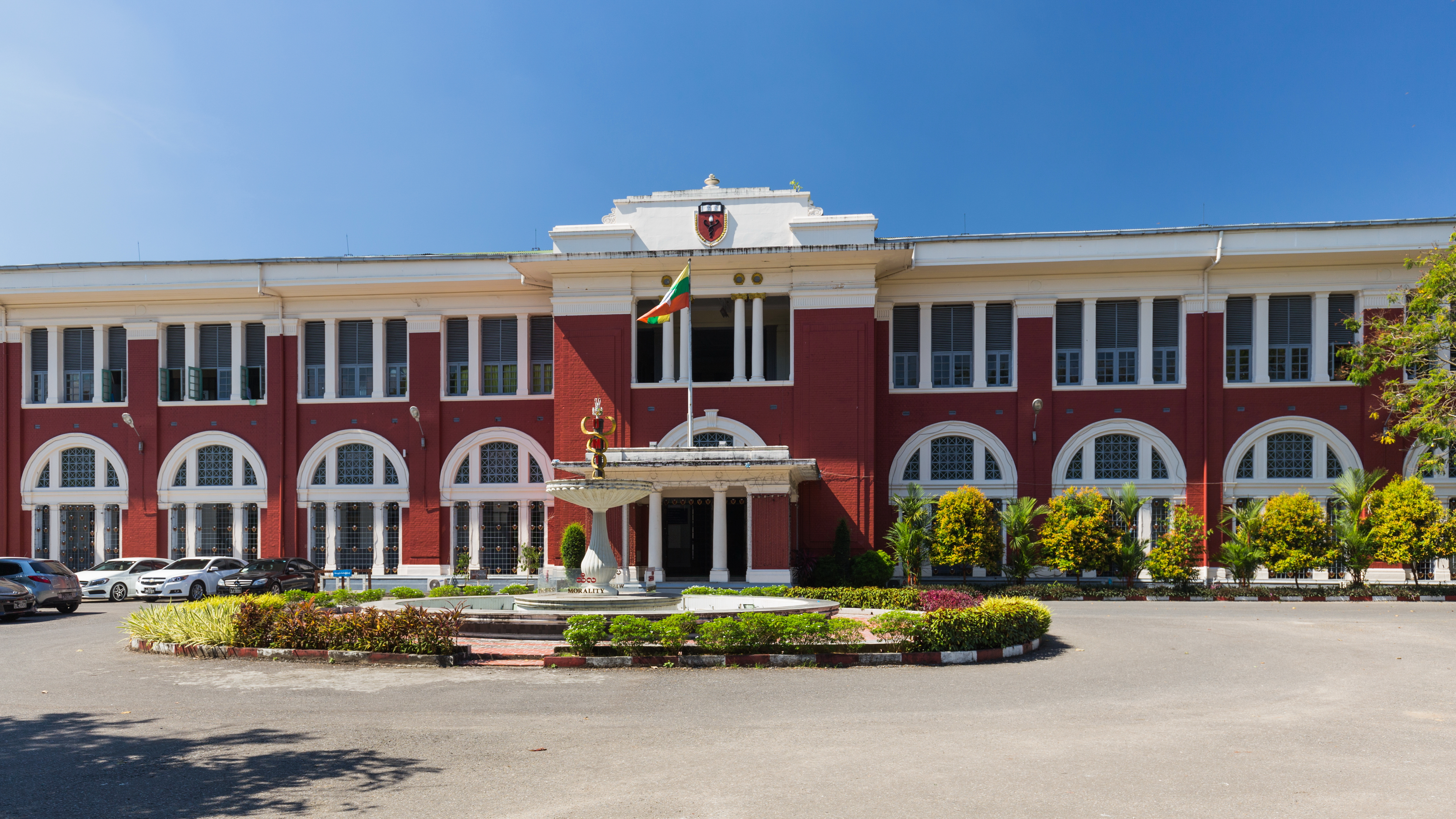
Lanmadaw campus, Faculty of Medicine, Rangoon; now University of Medicine 1, Yangon

After the country's independence in 1948, Min Sein was one of the few physicians left in the country. His post-independence career centered on rebuilding and expanding the country's medical education system. He was instrumental in restarting the medical school after the war. After independence, Min Sein and Ba Than took turns being the dean of the medical school for the next 11 years. Ba Than served three terms: 1948–1949, 1951–1953, and 1955–1957 while Min Sein served three more terms: 1949–1951, 1953–1955, and 1957–1959, (in addition to his 1947–1948 term before independence.) Min Sein also served as the Professor of Medicine from 1946 to 1959. (Note: The web page of the University of Medicine 1, Yangon (UM1 Dept. of Medicine) says he served from 1945 to 1959. But as per its own page (UM1 Faculties), the medical school was reopened only on 26 September 1946, and Min Sein was appointed as its head only then.) Under their leadership, the country produced 532 MBBS graduates between 1948 and 1957 in comparison to the 543 graduates between 1922 and 1941 during the colonial era.

Min Sein also represented the country on several occasions. He was a member of or leader of the country's missions to the UK, the US (1952), the USSR (1954) and Japan (1958). From 1956 to 1958, he was a member of the Expert Committee on Maternal and Child Health of the WHO, and a member of the Technical and Scientific committee, WHO. He also took on several roles in various national associations ranging from the Burma Medical Association (president, 1955–1956), the National Health Council, the National Fitness Council, and the Burma Olympic Committee (1948) to the Opium Enquiry Commission and the Racing Enquiry Commission. He was also president of the Britain-Burma Society, vice-president of the Burma Veterans League, and president of the Burma Medical Research Institute.

He retired from his twin roles as the Dean of the medical school and Professor of Medicine in 1959. He was succeeded by Maung Gale as dean, and Shwe Zan as Professor of Medicine. He received his FRCP fellowship from the Royal College Physicians at the end of his career in 1959. For his services, he was awarded the title of Thiri Pyanchi by the Burmese government in 1949. He also received his CBE title from the British government by 1970. (Note: Per (RCP 1967: 24), he was still an OBE in 1967. But per (RCP 1970: 98), he had become a CBE by 1970.)

== Personal life ==
He married Yin May in 1936. Yin May was the first Burmese obstetrician and gynecologist, and the first person to perform the Caesarian section in British Burma as well as the first Burmese ever to become a fellow in three different disciplines. The couple had a son and a daughter, including Thein Htut, a gastroenterologist, (Note: (Singh 1991: 166): Thein Htut FRCP FRCPEdin FRACP was born on 2 June 1939.) as well as an adopted son, Mya Thein Han, who went on to become the director of Myanmar Army Medical Corps.

Min Sein was a lifelong sports enthusiast. He was a Guy's Hospital tennis Blue; inter-collegiate long jump champion, Calcutta; president of the Burma Olympic Association, 1948, and captain of the Burma Golf Club. He was president of the Burma National Amateur Athletic Federation, and also of the Weight Lifting and Body Culture Federation, and director and steward of the Rangoon Turf Club.

Min Sein died on 9 November 1978, six weeks after his wife's death on 29 September 1978. He was 79.

== Bibliography ==
- "British Medical Journal: Supplement", British Medical Journal, London, 1948
- Churchill Livingstone (1947), The Medical Directory: London, Provinces, Wales, Scotland, Ireland, Abroad, Navy, Army & Air Force ..., vol. 2, UK: J. & A. Churchill Limited
- Committee on Interstate and Commerce, House of Representatives (1957), International Health, Washington: US Government Printing Office
- Civil List for Burma -- 1 September 1942 (PDF), Anglo-Burmese Library, 2014 [1942]
- "Service Notes", The Indian Medical Gazette, 1934
- Khin Thet Hta; Khin Khin Win; Htay Htay Aye; Mya Tu (2005), Who's who in Health and Medicine in Myanmar, Ministry of Health, Myanmar
- Maung Wa, Theippan (2009). L. E. Bagshawe; Anna J. Allott (eds.). Wartime in Burma: A Diary, January to June 1942. Ohio University Press. ISBN 9780896802704.
- Myint Swe, Wunna Kyawhtin Dr. (2014), The Japanese Era Rangoon General Hospital: Memoir of a Wartime Physician, translated by Zarny Tun (1st ed.), Yangon: Myanmar Book Centre, ISBN 978-99971-852-9-7
- Who Is Who in Burma, People's Literature Committee and House, 1961
- Royal College of Physicians (1954), List of the Fellows and Members of the Royal College of Physicians of London, London: Royal College of Physicians
- Royal College of Physicians (1957), List of the Fellows and Members of the Royal College of Physicians of London, London: Royal College of Physicians
- Royal College of Physicians (1967), List of the Fellows and Members of the Royal College of Physicians of London, London: Royal College of Physicians
- Royal College of Physicians (1970), List of the Fellows, Members, Extra-licentiates and Licentiates of the Royal College of Physicians of London, and of Holders of the Diploma in Public Health, Granted Conjointly by the Royal Colleges of Physicians and Surgeons, London: Royal College of Physicians
- Royal Society of Tropical Medicine and Hygiene (1932), Year-Book, London
- Saito, Teruko; Lee, Kin Kiong (1999). Saito Teruko (ed.). Statistics on the Burmese Economy: The 19th and 20th Centuries. Institute of Southeast Asian Studies. ISBN 978-98123-003-1-7.
- Jasbeer Singh, ed. (1991), Austral-Asian Who's Who, 1991, Oriental Publications, ISBN 9780646031903
- Tin Naing Toe (30 October 2011), "ခေတ်မီ ခွဲစိတ်သားဖွားစနစ်စတင်ကျင့်သုံးသူ သီရိပျံချီ ဒေါက်တာ ဒေါ်ရင်မေ" [First Obstetrician Thiri Pyanchi Dr. Daw Yin May], Weekly Eleven (in Burmese)
- Wolstenholme, Sir Gordon; Luniewska, Valérie, "Thiri Pyanchi Min Sein", Munk's Roll, vol. VII, Royal College of Physicians, p. 402
- University of Medicine 1, Yangon, History of University of Medicine 1, Yangon
- University of Medicine 1, Yangon, Faculty of Medicine
- University of Medicine 1, Yangon, Department of Medicine
- Victoria Hospital, Surgery, Victoria Hospital
- Yay, Patrick (2018), Agony to Agony: Part One: in Search of Tranquility, AuthorHouse, ISBN 9781546299202
