= Yin May =

Burmese obstetrician, gynecologist and educator

Thiri Pyanchi Yin May FRCS FRCP FRCOG

Head of Rangoon Dufferin Hospital
- In office 1946–1959
- Preceded by: Vacant
- Succeeded by: ?

Head of OG Dept., Faculty of Medicine, Rangoon University
- In office 1947–1959
- Preceded by: Position established
- Succeeded by: Khin Si

Head of Rangoon Public Maternity Hospital
- In office 1942–1945
- Preceded by: Position established
- Succeeded by: Position abolished

Deputy Head of Lady Dufferin Maternity Hospital
- In office 1930–1936

Personal details
- Born: September 1900 Prome (Pyay); Pegu Division, British Burma
- Died: 29 September 1978 (aged 78) Rangoon (Yangon); Rangoon Division, Burma (Myanmar)
- Spouse: Min Sein (m. 1936–1978)
- Children: Thein Htut; Tin Tin Aye; Mya Thein Han (adopted)
- Parent: U Kyaw
- Education: University of Calcutta (MB); Royal College of Surgeons of Edinburgh (FRCS)

Military service
- Allegiance: British Burma
- Branch/service: Burma Medical Service
- Years of service: 1946–1948
- Rank: Lt. Col.

Yin May (Burmese: ရင်မေ, pronounced [jìɰ̃ mè]; September 1900 – 29 September 1978) was a Burmese physician and educator. She was the first Burmese obstetrician and gynecologist, and the first person to perform the Caesarian section in British Burma. She is also known for her research on amoebic vaginitis, known as May's disease.

Yin May founded the country's main maternity hospital during the Japanese occupation (1942–1945), and she co-founded the wartime medical and nursing schools (1943–1945). After the war, she served as the head of Lady Dufferin Maternity Hospital from 1946 to 1959, and the head of the Department of Obstetrics and Gynecology of the Faculty of Medicine of Rangoon University from 1947 to 1959. Under her leadership, Dufferin became a maternity hospital recognized by the Royal College of Obstetricians and Gynaecologists in 1957.

== Early life and education ==
Yin May was born in September 1900 (Note: The web page of (Myanmar Medical Association, OG Society) says that she was born in September 1890. But the year is a typographical error. (Who's Who in Burma 1961: 103) and (Tin Naing Toe 2011) both say she was born in 1900. (MMA OG) itself says she graduated from high school in 1917, which would make her 27 years old if she was born in 1890.) to a well-to-do family in Prome (Pyay) in British Burma. (Her father U Kyaw was then the Deputy Commissioner of Prome, a mid-level official in the colonial administration, and later became the Secretary of Home and Defence by the early 1940s.) She had at least one brother, Thein Kyaw.

Yin May had a brilliant academic career. After two years at Rangoon College, she went to study medicine at the University of Calcutta on a scholarship in 1919, and graduated with an MB (and a gold medal in pathology) in 1925. She then spent a year at Rangoon General Hospital as a staff physician before leaving for the UK for graduate studies in obstetrics and gynecology in 1926. In 1927, she received her LRCP and MRCS certifications from the Royal College of Physicians of England and the Royal College of Surgeons of England, respectively. After two more years of training, she received her FRCS fellowship (specializing in gynecology) from the Royal College of Surgeons of Edinburgh in 1929, becoming the second Burmese woman FRCS in history. She returned to Rangoon in 1930, after stints in Dublin (1929) and Vienna (1930).

== Career ==
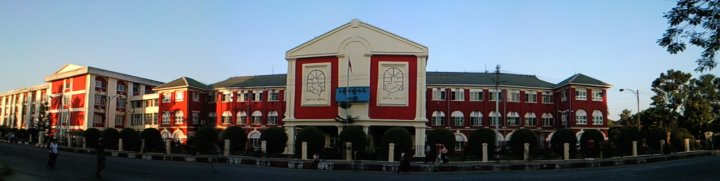
Lady Dufferin Maternity Hospital, now known as Yangon Central Women's Hospital

=== Pre-WWII ===
Back in Rangoon, Yin May started as the Assistant Medical Superintendent of Lady Dufferin Maternity Hospital in 1930. As the deputy head of a major hospital, she had joined the upper echelons of the tiny colonial era medical community made up mainly of foreign-born physicians and specialists that existed primarily in Rangoon (Yangon). (Her two superiors during her first stay at the hospital (1930–1936) were British IMS officers: Lt. Col. S.T. Crump (1930–1931) and Lt. Col. M.L. Treston (1931–1936). (Note: (Tin Naing Toe 2011) says her superior at Dufferin was [Lt.] Col. [M.L.] Treston. Per (BMJ 1970: 369), Treston became head of Dufferin only in 1931, succeeding Lt. Col. Stanley Trefusis Crump. (BMJ 1970: 369): Col. Maurice Lawrence Treston CBE, FRCS, FRCOG, IMS (9 February 1891–14 April 1970) was the Superintendent of the Dufferin Hospital from 1931 to 1941, and the Inspector General of Civil Hospitals from 1941 to 1942 (until the Japanese invasion). (Civil List 2014: 2, 55): Treston became a colonel in 1941, and served as the highest ranking health official in the exile government of British Burma in Simla during World War II.))

Yin May was instrumental in the expansion of modern obstetrics and gynecology (OG/OBGYN) practices in Burma; she was the first person to perform the Caesarian section in the country. She started an OG program at Rangoon Medical College that finally yielded the country's first ever MBBS graduates specializing in OG, and founded the first OG training school for midwives that taught primarily in Burmese in 1937. All the while, she contributed to the field. In 1937, she published her most famous research paper in The Indian Medical Gazette on amoebic vaginitis, which was subsequently named May's disease.

=== WWII ===
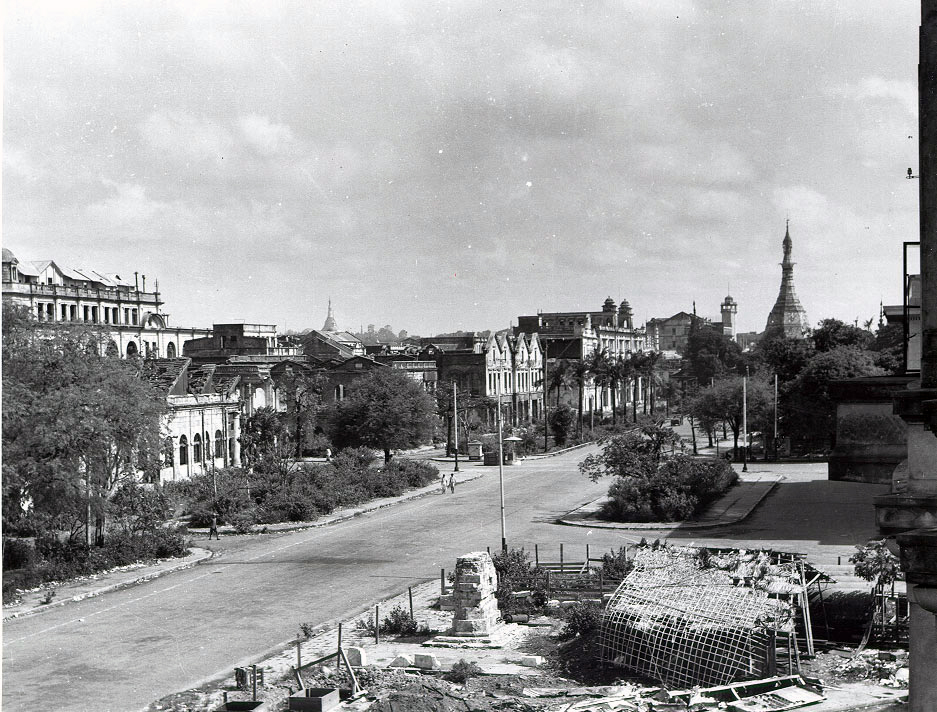
Rangoon in the aftermath of World War II

Yin May founded and ran the country's main maternity hospital during World War II (1942–1945). It was out of sheer necessity. The country had been without its main maternity hospital since 25 December 1941 when Japanese aerial bombing destroyed Dufferin Hospital. Patients from Dufferin were moved to Rangoon General Hospital but the Imperial Japanese Army seized the general hospital for its exclusive use in March 1942, leaving the non-Japanese without a hospital. Most of its tiny colonial era medical staff had also fled. Indeed, she herself fled with her husband Min Sein and their young son to Upper Burma in early 1942. (Note: (Maung Wa 2009: 121–122, 213–214): Yin May, her husband Maj. Min Sein and their son Thein Htut were in Mandalay on 25 March 1942. Her father U Kyaw, the writer Theippan Maung Wa's boss, was in Maymyo, the summer capital of the colonial administration.) But she somehow got separated from her family in Upper Burma, and returned to Rangoon c. mid 1942 alone, and pregnant. (Note: (Maung Wa 2009: 150): Yin May was in Indaw on 17 April 1942 without her family, and Min Sein sent her brother Thein Kyaw to fetch her. (Myint Swe 2014: 98): She gave birth to a baby in late 1942 in Rangoon as a single mother; her husband by then was in India.) She then joined BIA Hospital, the makeshift hospital founded by Dr. Ba Than, as the head of the Maternity Unit.

It would prove to be her biggest challenge yet. In the beginning, she had no staff with any OG experience; she was assigned just one novice physician Kyee Paw and a few nurses. According to Myint Swe, a pregnant Yin May, despite getting tired easily, worked all hours at the hospital; she even went back to work the night after she had given birth herself to perform a complicated surgery to save a mother's life. (Note: (Myint Swe 2014: 98–99): She needed to perform a craniotomy on the skull of the dead baby inside the mother's womb in order to save the mother. Since no one at the hospital could perform the surgery, Yin May went to the hospital on a trishaw with a gas lamp to navigate the dark lightless streets.) In late 1942, she was able to establish a maternity hospital in Tamwe Township. Dr. Kyee Paw, who would later become a highly accomplished surgeon and professor in his own right, joined as her deputy. The maternity hospital proved a lifeline to many would-be mothers, and became a training ground for a new generation of several young physicians and nurses. She, along with Drs. Ba Than and S. Sen, was a co-founder of the wartime medical and nursing schools. The trio oversaw the programs, and graded exam papers.

=== Post-WWII ===
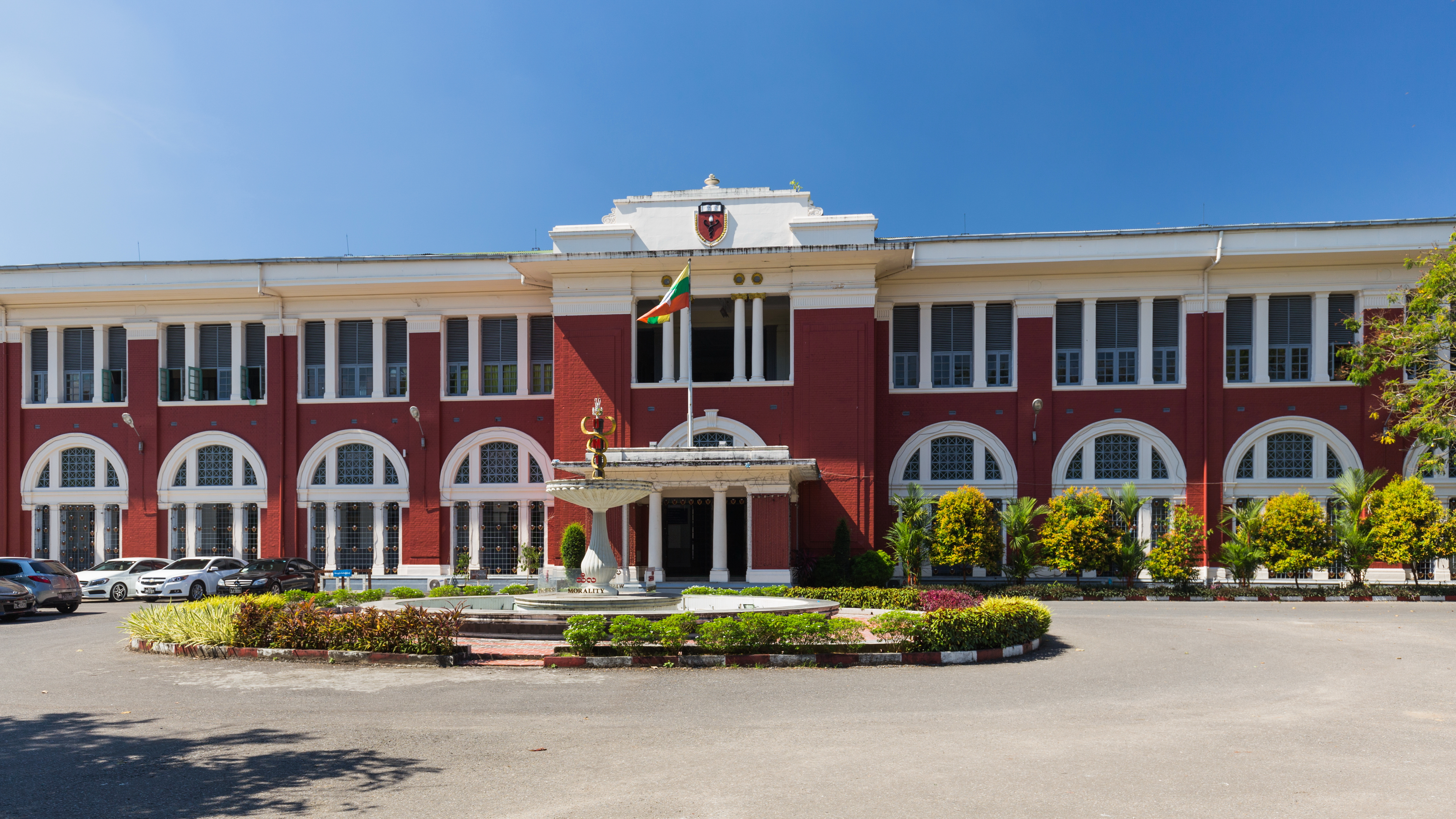
Lanmadaw campus, Faculty of Medicine, Rangoon; now University of Medicine 1, Yangon

After the war, she continued her roles as the foremost OG practitioner and educator in the country. She served as the head of the reconstructed Dufferin Hospital from 1946 to 1959, and also as the head of the Department of Obstetrics and Gynecology of the Faculty of Medicine of Rangoon University from 1947 to 1959. Between 1946 and 1948, she as the head (Medical Superintendent) of Dufferin also became a Lt. Col. in Burma Medical Service in the colonial administration called Civil Affairs Service, Burma (CAS-B). She was responsible for getting Dufferin Hospital to be recognized as a teaching hospital by the Royal College of Obstetricians and Gynaecologists in 1957. Having a local RCOG recognized hospital made it much easier for Burmese OGs to pursue FRCOG fellowships. Through the process, Yin May too became an FRCOG in 1957. It was her third fellowship; she became an FRCP from Royal College of Physicians, Edinburgh in 1954. She was the first Burmese to achieve a fellowship in three different disciplines, and is recognized as one of the pioneers of modern medicine in Myanmar. (Note: (Tin Naing Toe 2011): Dr. Saw Sa was the first Burmese FRCS fellow. Dr. Yin May was the first Burmese to achieve UK fellowships in three different disciplines. The first Burmese woman to receive an MBBS degree was an ethnic Karen named Dr. Sein Shin, who died shortly after receiving the degree; the first practicing Burmese female MBBS was Dr. May Su.)

Prof. Yin May retired in 1959 but remained active. She was a member of the executive committee of Burma Research Society. She died on 29 September 1978 in Rangoon. Her husband Min Sein died six weeks later on 9 November 1978. For her services to the country, she was awarded the title of Thiri Pyanchi in 1949.

== Personal life ==
Yin May married Dr. Min Sein, then a captain in the IMS, in 1936. Min Sein went on to become a lieutenant colonel in the BMS (the Burmese version of IMS) by 1946, the first Burmese dean of the Faculty of Medicine of Rangoon University in 1947. He served in the British 14th Army from 1942 to 1946. The couple had a son and a daughter, including Dr. Thein Htut, a gastroenterologist, (Note: (Singh 1991: 166): Thein Htut FRCP FRCPEdin FRACP was born on 2 June 1939.) as well as an adopted son, Brig. Gen. Dr. Mya Thein Han, who went on to become the director of Myanmar Army Medical Corps.

== Bibliography ==
- British Medical Journal (9 May 1970), "Col. M.L. Treston, CBE, FRCS, FRCOG, IMS", British Medical Journal, vol. 2, no. 5705, pp. 369–370, doi:10.1136/bmj.2.5705.369, S2CID 220195017
- Civil List for Burma -- 1 September 1942 (PDF), Anglo-Burmese Library, 2014 [1942]
- Kyu Kyu Swe, Dr. Daw (2009), To Keep Alive Forever, Our Cherished Memories (PDF), University of Medicine, Mandalay Alumni Association, archived from the original (PDF) on 11 July 2020
- Leigh, Michael D. (2014), The Evacuation of Civilians from Burma: Analysing the 1942 Colonial Disaster, Bloomsbury Publishing, ISBN 9781441132475
- Maung Wa, Theippan (2009). L. E. Bagshawe; Anna J. Allott (eds.). Wartime in Burma: A Diary, January to June 1942. Ohio University Press. ISBN 9780896802704.
- Myanmar Medical Association, OG Society, Professor Daw Yin May: Mother of Obstetrics and Gynaecology of Myanmar, archived from the original on 7 May 2021
- Myint Swe, Wunna Kyawhtin Dr. (2014), The Japanese Era Rangoon General Hospital: Memoir of a Wartime Physician, translated by Zarny Tun (1st ed.), Yangon: Myanmar Book Centre, ISBN 978-99971-852-9-7
- Who Is Who in Burma, People's Literature Committee and House, 1961
- Royal College of Physicians (1954), List of the Fellows and Members of the Royal College of Physicians of London, London: Royal College of Physicians
- Royal College of Physicians (1957), List of the Fellows and Members of the Royal College of Physicians of London, London: Royal College of Physicians
- Jasbeer Singh, ed. (1991), Austral-Asian Who's Who, 1991, Oriental Publications, ISBN 9780646031903
- Tin Naing Toe (30 October 2011), "ခေတ်မီ ခွဲစိတ်သားဖွားစနစ်စတင်ကျင့်သုံးသူ သီရိပျံချီ ဒေါက်တာ ဒေါ်ရင်မေ" [First Obstetrician Thiri Pyanchi Dr. Daw Yin May], Weekly Eleven (in Burmese), archived from the original on 26 April 2022
- Wolstenholme, Sir Gordon; Luniewska, Valérie, "Thiri Pyanchi Min Sein", Munk's Roll, vol. VII, Royal College of Physicians, p. 402
- University of Medicine 1, Yangon, History of University of Medicine 1, Yangon, archived from the original on 13 July 2020
- Surgery, Victoria Hospital, archived from the original on 21 January 2023
- Yay, Patrick (2018), Agony to Agony: Part One: in Search of Tranquility, ISBN 9781546299202
