= Myanmar Medical Association =

Organization

Myanmar Medical Association မြန်မာနိုင်ငံ ဆရာဝန် အသင်း
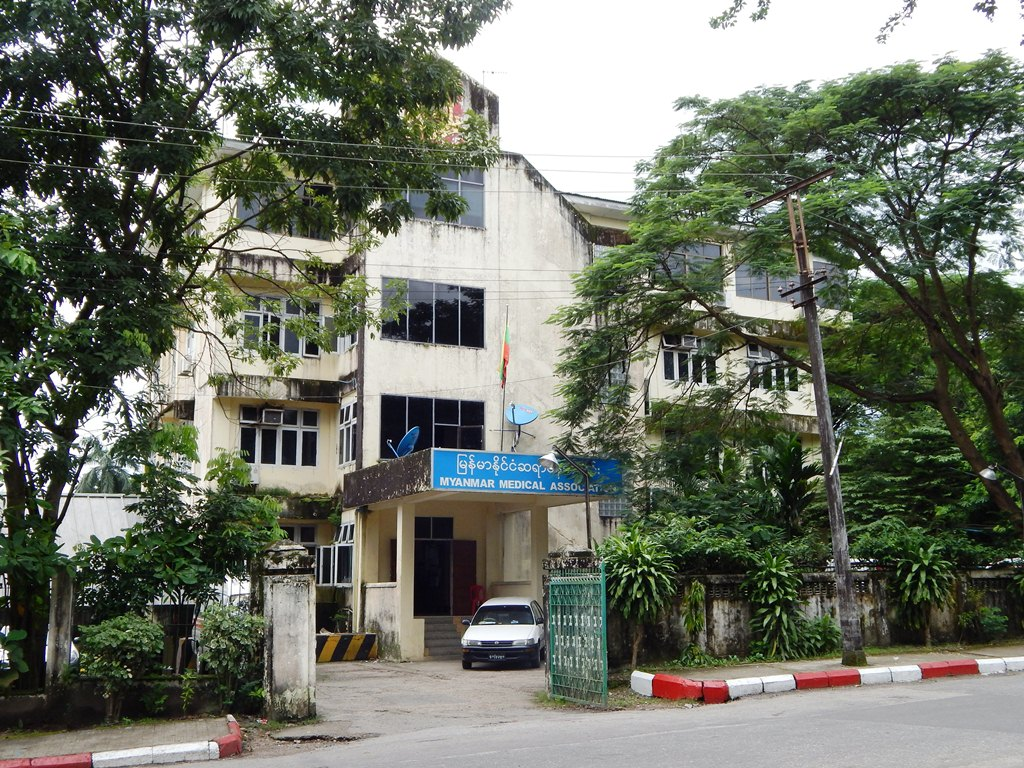
- Formation: 12 March 1949
- Type: Professional body
- Headquarters: Mingala Taungnyunt Township, Yangon
- Location: Myanmar
- Members: 18,000 (2013)
- Official language: English and Burmese
- President: Rai Mra
- Publication: Myanmar Medical Journal
- Website: www.mmacentral.org
- Formerly called: Burma Medical Association

The Myanmar Medical Association (Burmese: မြန်မာနိုင်ငံ ဆရာဝန် အသင်း; abbreviated MMA; formerly the Burma Medical Association) is Myanmar's only professional organisation of physicians. Founded in 1949 by Dr. Shwe Thwin, the association has approximately 17,000 members (2011). It is administered by a central executive committee and is divided into 33 different societies dedicated to a broad range of medical specialties. The MMA holds an annual conference and also provides continued medical education for its members.

== Journal ==
MMA publishes the Myanmar Medical Journal (formerly known as the Burma Medical Journal), a peer-reviewed medical journal aimed to advance medical science in Myanmar. The journal is one of three medical journals, alongside Myanmar Research Journal and Myanmar Journal of Current Medical Practice, published in the country.

It was established in 1953. During the early post-independence years, the Burma Medical Journal was Burma's only outlet for publishing and reading medical research papers.

== Leadership ==
Past presidents of the organisation include:

1. 1949–1950: Ba Thaw
2. 1951–1953: Ba Than Chain
3. 1953–1954: Maung Gale
4. 1954–1955: Ba Than
5. 1955–1956: Min Sein
6. 1957: Yin May
7. 1958: Maung Maung Gyi
8. 1959: T. Chan Taik
9. 1960: Sein Maung
10. 1961: Shwe Zan
11. 1963: Ko Gyi
12. 1964: Ba Than (Setkya)
13. 1965: Khin Maung Win
14. 1966: U E
15. 1967: San Lwin
16. 1968: Maung Maung Than
17. 1969–1970: Pe Kyin
18. 1971–1972: Aung Thein
19. 1973–1974: Kyaw Maung
20. 1975–1976: Hla Kyi
21. 1977: Maung Maung Aye
22. 1978: Maung Maung Taik
23. 1979–1980: Shwe Tin
24. 1980–1981: Myat Kyi Than
25. 1981–1982: Hla Myint
26. 1983: Khin Maung Nyein
27. 1984–1988: Tin U
28. 1989–1992: Thet Hta Way
29. 1993–1996: Kyu Kyu Swe
30. 1997–1998: Ye Myint
31. 1999–2005: Myo Myint
32. 2006–2013: Kyaw Myint Naing
33. 2014–2019: Rai Mra
34. 2020–present: Htin Aung Saw
