= Ba Than (surgeon) =

Burmese physician and educator

Thiri Pyanchi Ba Than FRCS FACS FICS
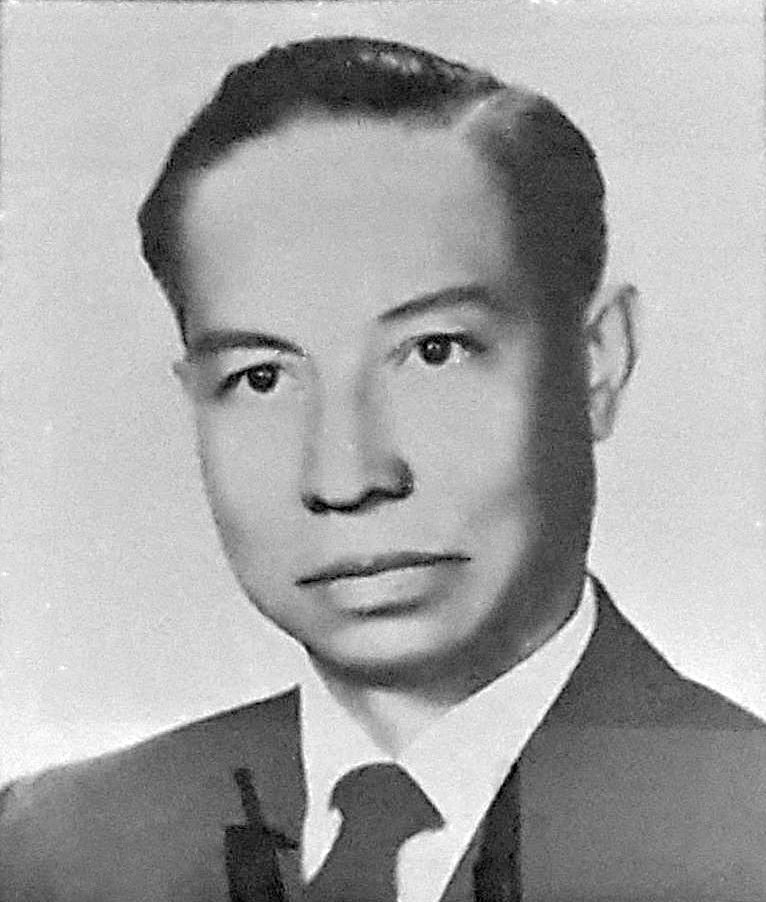

1st Rector of the Institute of Medicine 1, Rangoon
- In office 1 October 1964 – 30 August 1971
- Preceded by: Position established
- Succeeded by: Pe Kyin

1st Dean of the Faculty of Medicine, Mandalay University
- In office 1960–1963
- Preceded by: Position established
- Succeeded by: Pe Thein

3rd, 5th and 7th Dean of the Faculty of Medicine, Rangoon University
- In office 1955–1957
- Preceded by: Min Sein
- Succeeded by: Min Sein
- In office 1951–1953
- Preceded by: Min Sein
- Succeeded by: Min Sein
- In office 1948–1949
- Preceded by: Min Sein
- Succeeded by: Min Sein

Head of Rangoon Public General Hospital
- In office 1942–1945
- Preceded by: Position established
- Succeeded by: Position abolished

Personal details
- Born: c. 9 May 1895 c. Thursday, 2nd waning of Kason 1257 ME Pyuntaza; Pegu Division, British Burma
- Died: 4 November 1971; Thursday, 2nd waning of Tazaungmon 1333 ME Rangoon (Yangon); Rangoon Division, Burma (Myanmar)
- Spouse: Khin Kyi
- Children: Kyaw Than; Khin May Than; Khin May Aye
- Education: University of Calcutta (MB); Royal College of Surgeons of Edinburgh (FRCS)

Thiri Pyanchi Ba Than FRCS FACS FICS (Burmese: ဘသန်း, pronounced [ba̰ ðáɰ̃]; c. 9 May 1895 – 4 November 1971) was a Burmese medical surgeon, educator and administrator. The first Burmese police surgeon in British Burma, Ba Than founded and ran the main hospital in Rangoon (Yangon) as well as the wartime medical and nursing schools during the Japanese occupation of the country (1942–1945). After the country's independence in 1948, Ba Than served several terms as dean and rector of the main medical universities in Rangoon and Mandalay until two months before his death in 1971.

He is also known for his autopsies of famous politicians, including those of Aung San and Tin Tut. His daughter Khin May Than, third wife of General Ne Win, was the First Lady of Burma from 1962 to 1972.

== Early life and career ==
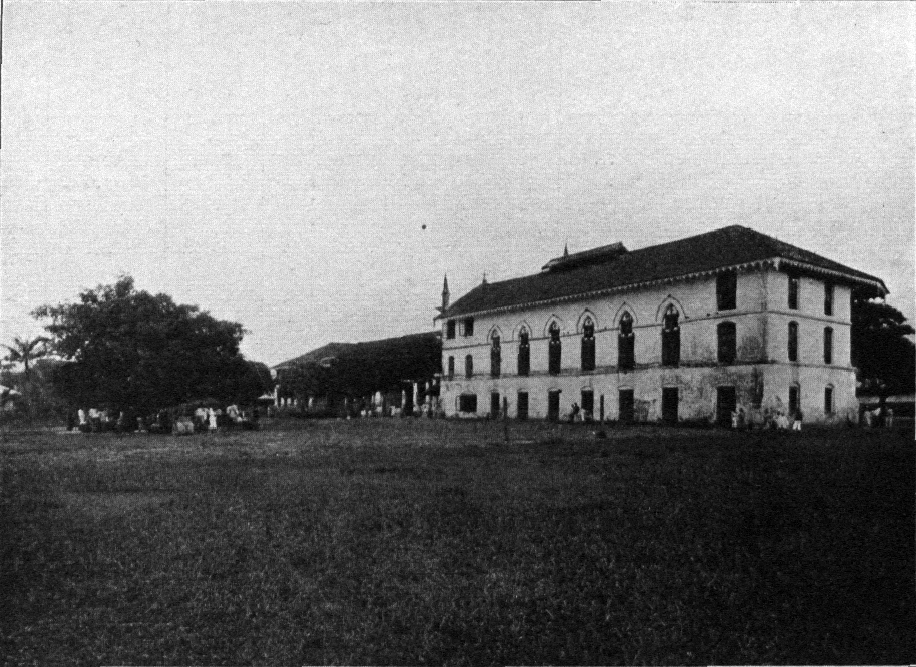
St. Paul's High School where Ba Than graduated from in the 1910s

Ba Than was born to U Kinn and Daw Swei in May 1895 in Pyuntaza, a small town about 140 km (87 mi) northeast of Yangon (Rangoon), in what was then British Burma. His parents were apparently well-to-do as he graduated from Rangoon's St. Paul's English High School, went to Rangoon College in 1914, and went on to study medicine at the University of Calcutta where he received an MB in 1922. (Burma's first MBBS program began only in 1923.) He started out as a Civil Assistant Surgeon (CAS) in the Health Department in 1922, (Note: (Khin Thet-Hta et al 2005: 84) says Ba Than received his MB and became a CAS in 1922. But (Civil List 1942: 56) says he became a civil surgeon in the Indian Medical Department on 23 July 1921. The seeming discrepancy may perhaps be due to one of the following: (1) Ba Than joined the service as a resident before he got his degree; or (2) (Khin Thet Hta)'s 1922 date is incorrect. However, given that Ba Than was only a first year student at Rangoon College in 1914 per (Thane Oke Kyaw Myint 2020), he most probably went to Calcutta only in 1916 and received his MB in 1922. He apparently joined the service as a resident in 1921.) and received his FRCS certification from the Royal College of Surgeons of Edinburgh in 1932.

By then, Ba Than was part of the tiny colonial era medical community made up mainly of foreign-born physicians and specialists that existed primarily in Rangoon. (Note: (Myint Swe 2014: xi–xii): About half of the physicians and most of the specialists at Rangoon General Hospital were foreign born. To see a specialist, everyone in the country needed to go to RGH. The "small medical system was run mainly by foreigners and the tiny elite for foreigners and the tiny elite." (Myint Swe 2014: 134–135): It was exceedingly difficult to get into medical school even in the late colonial period. The class size was disproportionately small for the size of country's population (13.2 million in 1921 and 16.8 million in 1941 (per Saito and Lee 1999: 1)). Between 1922 and 1941, a grand total of 543 students graduated from Rangoon Medical College (RMC), or 27 new graduates on average each year. Of the grand total, the number of indigenous Burmese graduates was only 228 (42%), or less than a dozen per year.) Known for his extreme work ethic—his motto was "zwe" (ဇွဲ, lit. "perseverance, persistence"), the surgeon by the late 1930s had risen to be the deputy head of the surgery department at Rangoon General Hospital (RGH) and the first Burmese police surgeon. His first high-profile case came in 1938 when he led the autopsy of Aung Kyaw, a student leader killed by the colonial police, amidst nationwide protests against the colonial government.

In 1937, Ba Than also began teaching at Rangoon Medical College as a lecturer in forensic medicine. He was an inspiration for Burmese medical students. According to Myint Swe, who studied at RMC from 1939 to 1942, Ba Than and one Henry Aung Khin (Note: (India and Burma Office List 1945: 242): Lt. Col. Henry Aung Khin (born 8 December 1887; MB, FRCS) was first commissioned as an IMS medical officer on 1 November 1920, started at Rangoon General Hospital in October 1924, and retired in December 1942. (Crawford 2012: 572): Aung Khin received his M.B. Ch. B. in 1911; joined the IMS as a Temporary Lt. in 1915; became a permanent Lt. in 1920; promoted to Major in 1926; became an FRCS in 1926. (Burma Civil List 1942: 55): Aung Khin was promoted to Lt. Col. in 1934. (Myint Swe 2014: 5): Lt. Col. H. Aung Khin was a lecturer in surgery at Rangoon Medical College in the 1930s.) were the only two surgeons of indigenous Burmese descent he knew of at the time. (Myint Swe apparently did not recall that there was at least one other Burmese practicing FRCS surgeon at the time. She was Dr. Yin May, who received her FRCS in gynecology from RCS Edinburgh in 1929, three years before Ba Than. Another FRCS surgeon was Dr. Saw Sa, who became the first woman legislator in the colonial parliament in 1937.)

== Japanese occupation period (1942–1945) ==
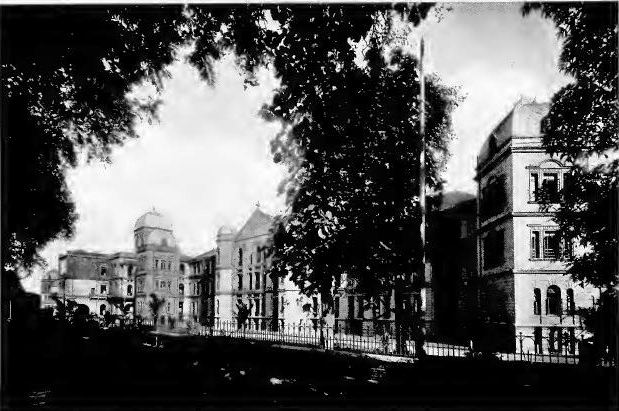
Rangoon General Hospital was taken over by the Imperial Japanese Army (1942–1945).

Ba Than is best remembered for founding the main hospital in Rangoon to serve non-Japanese patients during the Japanese occupation of Burma (1942–1945) during World War II. The hospital served Burma Independence/Defence Army (BIA/BDA) and Indian National Army (INA) officers and troops as well as the general public. He also founded the wartime medical and nursing schools.

=== Wartime hospital ===
Ba Than came to found the hospital out of sheer necessity in wartime Burma. He was one of the few physicians, and of even fewer specialists, who had not evacuated the country along with the British administration. Furthermore, the city lost its main hospital when the Imperial Japanese Army seized and reserved Rangoon General Hospital only for the Japanese (soon after the IJA and their allies Burma Independence Army (BIA) took the city on 7 March 1942). The incoming Japanese administration sent Dr. T. Suzuki (Note: Dr. T. Suzuki was not Maj. Gen. Keiji Suzuki, who recruited the Thirty Comrades. Per (Myint Swe 2014: 20), Dr. T. Suzuki was a Japanese national who operated a private medical clinic ("Suzuki Maternity Clinic") in Rangoon before WWII started. When the Japanese Army came, Suzuki became the Chief Administrator of the BIA Hospital with the rank of "major general" (presumably a military physician rank) for a brief period. Suzuki went on to open a new clinic called Dojingai in the Kandawgalay section of Rangoon.) to ask Ba Than to found a new hospital for the BIA. Ba Than agreed, and in late March, with one other physician and an assistant, opened a "hospital" in the building of Anglican Diocesan School of Rangoon, with an outpatient clinic and a few beds.

Ba Than faced several challenges from the outset. The most pressing was staffing. With most trained personnel gone, he had to resort to taking in final year medical students and nurse trainees. He was able to persuade most of the few remaining doctors and nurses in the country to join his fledgling outfit. Three highly experienced specialists—Dr. S. Sen (as Head of Internal Medicine), Dr. Yin May (as Head of Maternity Unit) and Dr. Chan Taik (as Head of Ophthalmology)—did join. Indeed some like Dr. Yin May, Dr. Sen and senior nurse Khin Kyi had chosen to return to Rangoon. (Note: (Maung Wa 2009: 121–122, 213–215): Yin May and her family fled to Upper Burma but she somehow got separated from her family. (Myint Swe 2014: 98): Yin May returned to Rangoon. (Myint Swe 2014: 63): Dr. S. Sen (MB Calcutta, FRCP Glasgow, MRCP London, FCCP US, DTM&H London) was in Mogok but came to join his former RGH colleague Ba Than's outfit. According to Myint Swe, Sen was rumored to have had a hand in the escape of Ba Maw from prison in Mogok. This suggests that Sen may have been collaborating with Ba Maw and Ba Maw's allies, the INA. (Wintle 2013: 111–112): Khin Kyi was already in Calcutta in February 1942, and took what turned out to be the last boat back to Rangoon.) To be sure, not everyone who remained joined. Myint Swe, who joined the hospital as a resident in April 1942, recounted an exchange in English between Ba Than and a former colleague of Ba Than who came to see the "hospital": the man reportedly remarked that "a handful of fellows can't do anything" to which Ba Than responded "it's the determined few that command the crowd."

"It's the determined few that command the crowd."

— Ba Than in response to the remark "A handful of fellows can't do anything".

Ba Than was determined to prove his skeptics wrong. He worked tirelessly at the hospital, often sleeping at the hospital throughout the years. In the early days of the hospital, he handled all types of cases, not just surgery ones. Over the next six months, he pieced together the staff, equipment, and supplies to have a semblance of a functioning hospital. Under his leadership, the hospital became the main to-go place for all non-Japanese patients, not only the BIA/BDA and INA brass but also the ordinary servicemen and the general public. Founded as the BIA Hospital, the hospital was renamed as the Public General Hospital of Rangoon on 1 November 1942, and placed under the Ministry of Health.

One constant headache for Ba Than was Japanese surveillance and interference. The hospital operated under the watchful eye of Japanese agents, who planted themselves as longterm patients till the end. However, the bigger issue for the staff was the constant disruption by the Japanese troops from the nearby barracks, who would barge in and mistreat patients and staff, nurses in particular. Ba Than himself was interrogated by the soldiers on a whim. (Note: (Myint Swe 2014: 138–139): One day, two Japanese servicemen (not officers) barged in and brought Ba Than out of the classroom in which he was teaching, sat him down in a chair, and interrogated him as to why the barracks were not receiving enough water. According to Myint Swe, the Burmese students and staff were all humiliated but felt totally powerless to do anything.) In 1943, the Japanese began sending doctors from the hospital to work on the Death Railway at the Thai-Burmese border, which most people took as a death sentence. According to Myint Swe, everyone felt powerless and humiliated but no one could do anything about it.

What Ba Than did do was to keep his overworked staff motivated and entertained by organizing musical performances. Ba Than was an avid pianist and Burmese xylophonist, and he found time to organize small musical and opera performances by his staff for the patients. His two young children, Katie and Georgie, who were accomplished pianists, also performed at the shows.

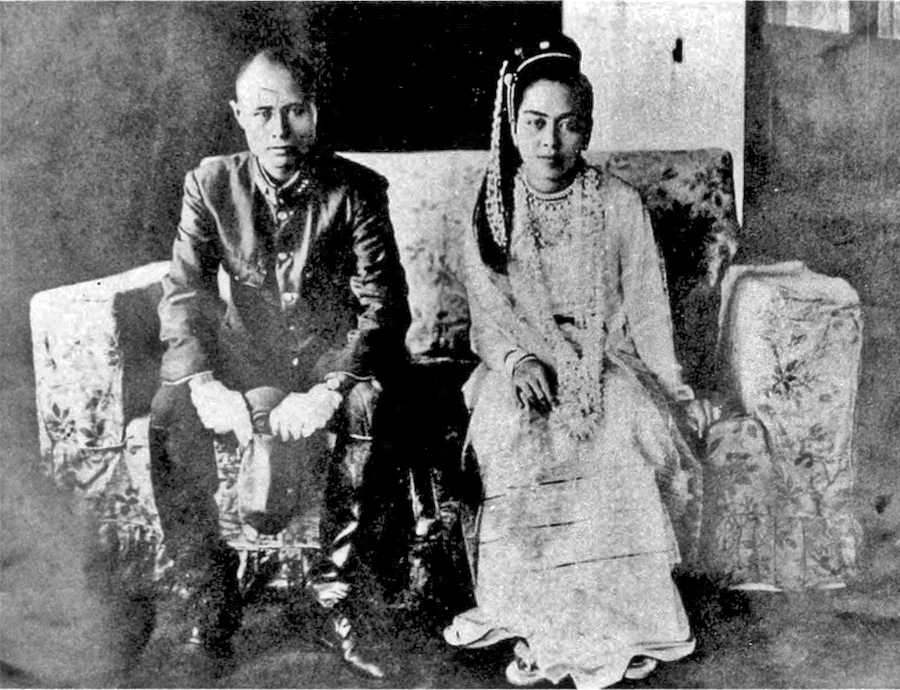
The wedding of Gen. Aung San and Khin Kyi was held at the wartime hospital on 6 September 1942. The photo was taken at the easternmost hall of the hospital.

The hospital was the place where historically important people were treated, including Aung San, Ne Win, Bo Letya, Bo Setkya, Thakin Than Tun, Thakin Mya, Thakin Po Hla Gyi, Ba Cho, Kyaw Nyein, S. C. Bose, and J. R. Bhonsle. It was also the place where Gen. Aung San met his future wife Khin Kyi during his brief hospitalization in mid 1942. Ba Than organized the wedding reception at the hospital, and even gave a song-and-piano performance. (Note: (Myint Swe 2014: 55): Ba Than played the piano and sang the inaugural wedding song called "Thet Wai" (သက်ဝေ), a prewar hit by Pyi Hla Pe and May Shin.)

=== Wartime medical and nursing schools ===
Ba Than also restarted the country's medical and nursing schools in 1943. The schools were to address the severe staff shortage throughout the country, including the Burmese military, which had only a skeleton medical staff. Although the hospital had attracted more physicians and nurses by November 1942, the patient load had also increased even faster. Ba Than recruited a few specialists/professors (Drs. Asahi, Suji, Horibe, and Shikuma) directly from Japan to join the hospital and the medical school. Even then, the wartime school could offer only an accelerated two and a half year LSMP (Licensed Surgery and Medical Practitioner) program, not a full-fledged MBBS program. (The school's entire inaugural graduating class of June 1944 was drafted by the Burmese Army. The next class graduated in December 1944.) The nursing school's classes were held in the evening at the hospital and were taught initially by two senior nurses (Mi Mi Gyi and Tin Nu), and later by the graduates of the program. The program was overseen by Drs. Ba Than, Sen, and Yin May, who also graded exam papers.

== Post-WWII ==
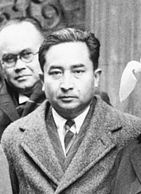
Tin Tut in London, 1947

After Allied forces returned to Rangoon in May 1945, Ba Than was repeatedly questioned by the British as to why he stayed behind and cooperated with the Japanese. In the end, the British reprimanded Ba Than only for the terrible conditions at the hospital, which they shut down in July 1945. The British also restarted RMC as the Faculty of Medicine of Rangoon University in 1946, installing Dr. W. Burridge as its first dean, and later Lt. Col. Dr. Min Sein (husband of Dr. Yin May) in 1947. (Ba Than would not be dean until after the British left in 1948.)

Nonetheless, Ba Than was the "top surgeon" in the country by then. He is remembered for his autopsies of famous politicians (many of whom were assassinated). He led the autopsies of Gen. Aung San and other cabinet officials who were assassinated on 19 July 1947, and later testified at the trial of the plotters. The assassinated nine are commemorated each year on Martyrs' Day in the country. In September 1948, he performed the post-mortem of Tin Tut, the first Foreign Minister of the newly independent country. Tin Tut had survived the July 1947 assassination but did not survive the second attempt. (Ba Than also did the post-mortem of Po Hla Gyi in 1943.)

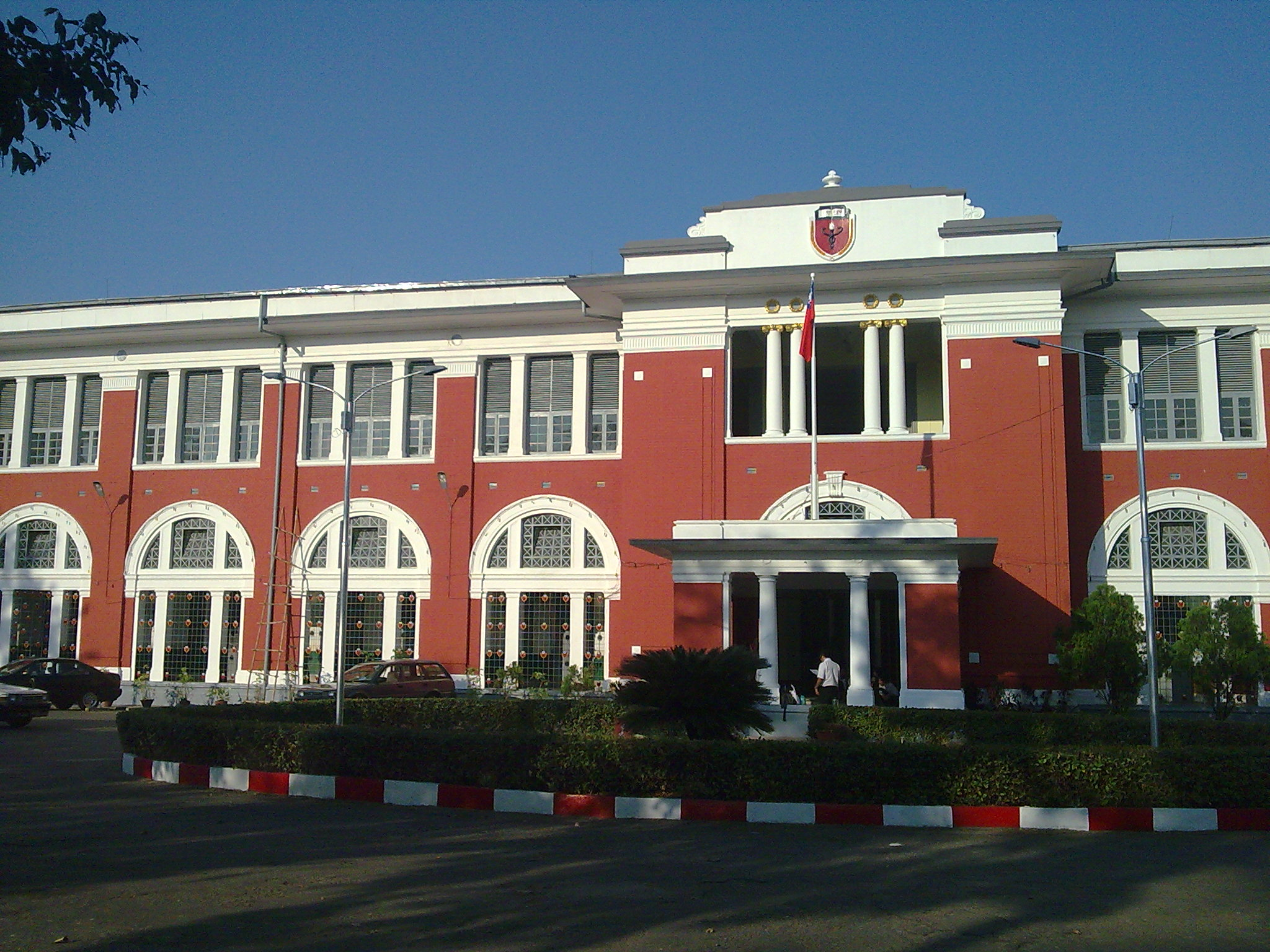
Lanmadaw campus, Institute of Medicine 1, Rangoon

After independence, Ba Than increasingly focused on expanding medical education in the country. From 1948 onwards, he and Min Sein took turns being the dean of the medical school for the next 11 years. Ba Than served three terms: 1948–1949, 1951–1953, and 1955–1957 while Min Sein served three more: 1949–1951, 1953–1955, and 1957–1959, (in addition to his 1947–1948 term before independence.) Ba Than also served as the head of the Department of Surgery from 1947 to 1959; he was succeeded by one of his wartime hospital colleagues, Dr. Kyee Paw. Ba Than was instrumental in starting a medical school in Mandalay, serving as the first dean of the Faculty of Medicine of Mandalay University from 1960 to 1963. (Note: (Khin Thet-Hta et al 2005: 12): The Faculty of Medicine of Mandalay University was founded in 1958 but its first official rector, Ba Than, started only in 1960.)

Ba Than finished out his long career in Rangoon. In 1964, the 69-year-old became the first rector of the Institute of Medicine 1, Rangoon which had just been carved out of Rangoon University as an independent institution. According to his former students, the professor was still preaching about the importance of zwe (perseverance) to his students, (Note: (Myint Swe 2014: 258): Ba Than liked to give his favorite advice by deliberately spelling out the Burmese word ဇွဲ (zwe) as "za-gwe wa-swe nauppyit, zwe", (p-e-r-s-e-v-e-r-a-n-c-e!).") and organizing musical troupes and shows at the school in which he would perform a song about zwe. In his free time, he served as a consultant surgeon at East Rangoon General Hospital well into his 70s. The rector retired on 30 August 1971, and died nine weeks later on 4 November 1971. He was 76.

For his services to the country, he was awarded the title of Thiri Pyanchi by the Burmese government. (Note: (Burma Research Society 1967: 63): He was already a Thiri Pyanchi in 1967.)

== Personal life ==
Although best known for his driven nature, Ba Than had other interests. He loved music, and liked playing the piano and the pattala in his free time. (Note: (Myint Swe 2014: 232): According to Myint Swe, during the Japanese era, Ba Than used to sing the song "Shwe Zabe-Yon" (ရွှေစံပယ်ရုံ) in his free time. (Myint Swe 2014: 66): He also performed the "Asia Youth" song at the wartime hospital in his formal traditional Burmese attire.) According to historian Robert Taylor, Ba Than was a "bon vivant known to enjoy the Turf Club and sports, as well as ladies". He was married to Khin Kyi, (not Khin Kyi the wife of Gen. Aung San and mother of Aung San Suu Kyi). The couple had at least three children:

- Kyaw Than (George "Georgie"): U.S. trained urologist. He and his American wife Nancy left for the US for good in 1965.
- Khin May Than (Katherine "Katie" or "Kitty") (16 August 1927 – 30 September 1972): Wife of Gen. Ne Win (1951–1972) and First Lady of Burma (1962–1972). Died of brain hemorrhage in London in 1972. She was earlier married to Dr. Taung Gyi and had three daughters. With Gen. Ne Win, she had two daughters and a son.
- Khin May Aye (Amy): Wife of Aung Than, rector, Institute of Dental Medicine, Rangoon (1964–1982).

== Bibliography ==
- "Thiri Pyanchi Dr. Ba Than", The Journal of the Burma Research Society, Rangoon: Burma Research Society, 1967
- Burma Secretariat Incident Enquiry Committee (1939), Report of the Secretariat Incident Enquiry Committee, Superintendent, Government Printing and Stationery, Burma
- Civil List for Burma -- 1 September 1942 (PDF), Anglo-Burmese Library, 2014 [1942]
- Crawford, D.G. (2012), Roll of the Indian Medical Service 1615-1930, vol. 2, Naval & Military Press, ISBN 9781781502310
- "Khin May Than", Forward, Yangon: Department of Information and Broadcasting, Burma, 1972
- The India Office and Burma Office List 1945, London: His Majesty's Stationery Office, 1945
- Khin Thet Hta; Khin Khin Win; Htay Htay Aye; Mya Tu (2005), Who's who in Health and Medicine in Myanmar, Ministry of Health, Myanmar
- Kolås, Åshild (17 June 2019), Women, Peace and Security in Myanmar: Between Feminism and Ethnopolitics, Routledge, ISBN 9781000300833
- Kyaw-Myint, Thane Oke (2006), Prof U Ba Than, Alumni of Myanmar Institutes of Medicine, archived from the original on 29 June 2022
- Kyaw-Myint, Thane Oke (2020), My Father (U Kyaw Myint), Hla Min, archived from the original on 27 February 2021
- Kyaw Win, U (2016), My Conscience: An Exile's Memoir of Burma, Wipf and Stock Publishers
- Maung Maung (2012), A Trial in Burma: The Assassination of Aung San, Springer Netherlands, p. 117, ISBN 9789401504577
- Maung Wa, Theippan (2009). L. E. Bagshawe; Anna J. Allott (eds.). Wartime in Burma: A Diary, January to June 1942. Ohio University Press. ISBN 9780896802704.
- Professor Daw Yin May: Mother of Obstetrics and Gynaecology of Myanmar, Myanmar Medical Association, OG Society, archived from the original on 7 May 2021
- Myint Swe, Wunna Kyawhtin Dr. (2014), The Japanese Era Rangoon General Hospital: Memoir of a Wartime Physician, translated by Zarny Tun (1st ed.), Yangon: Myanmar Book Centre, ISBN 978-99971-852-9-7
- Saito, Teruko; Lee, Kin Kiong (1999), Saito Teruko (ed.), Statistics on the Burmese Economy: The 19th and 20th Centuries, Institute of Southeast Asian Studies, ISBN 978-98123-003-1-7
- Taylor, Robert (2015), General Ne Win: A Political Biography, Singapore: Institute of Southeast Asian Studies, ISBN 978-981-4620-13-0
- University of Medicine 1, Yangon, History of the University of Medicine 1, Yangon, University of Medicine 1, Yangon, archived from the original on 13 July 2020
- University of Medicine 1, Yangon, Department of Surgery, University of Medicine 1, Yangon, archived from the original on 13 August 2020
- Who Is Who in Burma, People's Literature Committee and House, 1961
- Wintle, Justin (2013), Perfect Hostage: A Life of Aung San Suu Kyi, Burma's Prisoner of Conscience, Skyhorse, ISBN 978-162-0876-22-0
