= The Japanese Era Rangoon General Hospital =

1967 memoir by Myint Swe

- Book cover for the English edition c. 2014 for The Japanese Era Rangoon General Hospital: Memoir of A Wartime Physician
- Author: Myint Swe
- Original title: မှတ်မိသေးတယ် ဂျပန်ခေတ်ဆေးရုံကြီးဝယ်
- Translator: Khin Swe Hla (1967); Zarny Tun (2014)
- Language: Burmese
- Genre: non-fiction
- Publisher: Nay Yi Yi (1967, 1968); Zabe Oo (2010); Myanmar Book Centre (2014)
- Publication date: 1967
- Publication place: Myanmar
- English publication date: 2014
- Pages: 444 (2010 edition); 273 (2014 English translation)
- Followed by: Doctor Yan Ku, Me Yan Pyu

The Japanese Era Rangoon General Hospital: Memoir of A Wartime Physician (Burmese: မှတ်မိသေးတယ် ဂျပန်ခေတ်ဆေးရုံကြီးဝယ်) is a 1967 memoir written by Myint Swe. It chronicles the events at the only hospital in Yangon (Rangoon) open to non-Japanese during the Japanese occupation of Burma. The book includes the author's eyewitness accounts of hardship and struggles at the makeshift hospital as well as several key people of the era that were treated there, including: Aung San, Ne Win, Bo Letya, Bo Setkya, Thakin Than Tun, Thakin Mya, Ba Cho, Kyaw Nyein, Thakin Po Hla Gyi, Lanmadaw Po Tok, S. C. Bose, and J. R. Bhonsle.

The first edition won the Burma National Literature Award, 2nd Prize for 1967. The second edition of the book was published in 1968, and includes a few more sections. The second edition has been reprinted two times (2010 and 2015), and translated into English (2014).

== Publishing history ==
Myint Swe recounted in the book how he came to write the book. He wrote that he had always recounted the stories at the wartime hospital to countless friends and colleagues over the years, and that upon the repeated urging of Myint Oo, editor of Shaytho Magazine, he finally began writing his first ever book in 1966.

=== In Burmese ===
- 1st edition (1967)
- 2nd edition (1968)
- 2nd edition, 2nd printing (2010)
- 2nd edition, 3rd printing (2015)

=== Translations ===
- 1st edition, in English, as weekly serials in The Working People's Daily (1967–68?), not completed (Note: (Myint Swe 2014: vii): The first English translation of the book by Khin Swe Hla appeared in The Working People's Daily as weekly serials starting in October 1967. But the serials ended after a short period without having covered the entire book.)
- 2nd edition, in English, (2014)

== Bibliography ==
- Myint Swe, Wunna Kyawhtin Dr. (2010). Hmat-Mi-Thay-De Japan Khit Hsay-Yon-Gyi We (in Burmese) (2nd, 2nd printing ed.). Yangon: Zabe Oo.
- Myint Swe, Wunna Kyawhtin Dr. (2014). The Japanese Era Rangoon General Hospital: Memoir of a Wartime Physician. Translated by Zarny Tun. Yangon: Myanmar Book Centre. ISBN 978-99971-852-9-7.
- Zaw Win Tun (2015-09-12). "Bogyoke Aung San Taing-Bin-Ge-De Luzo: Wunna Kyawhtin Dr. Myint Swe". The Sun Rays News Journal (in Burmese). 1 (64). Yangon.
