= 1300 Revolution =

20th century strike in Myanmar

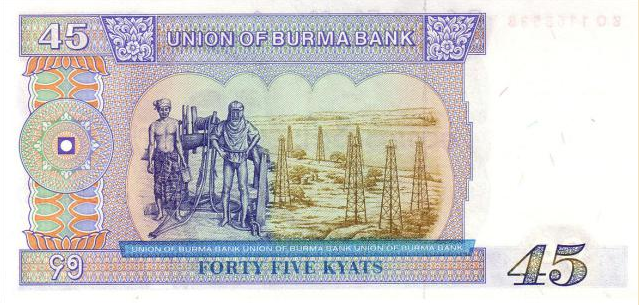
The 45 Myanmar kyat note depicting the oilfield strikes

The 1300 Revolution (Burmese: ၁၃၀၀ ပြည့် အရေးတော်ပုံ; also called the 1300 Movement or Year 1300 Strikes) was a nationwide general strike in Myanmar in 1938–1939, beginning with oilfield strikes. It is named for the year it occurred: 1300 in the Myanmar calendar. The strike's length and reach united many people in Burma in solidarity against the British colonial government. It is often regarded as one of the seminal first steps towards Myanmar's Independence.

== Beginning of strike ==
Prior to 1938, the British-owned Burmah Oil Company (BOC) fired staff without reason. On 8 January, oil workers in Chauk went on strike with additional grievances including the low wages, lack of medical leave and reductions in the number of religious holidays given by the BOC. The daily wage for oil workers was 7–8 pe while the British managers earned about 100 rupees per day, almost 1428 times as much as the average worker. This strike spread to a BOC refinery in Thanlyin Township, south of Rangoon, the capital of British Burma.

== March to Rangoon ==
By November, thousands of workers on strike in Chauk decided to march to Rangoon (present-day Yangon), led by Thakin Po Hla Gyi to present their demands to the BOC. Farmers and members of the nationalist group Dobama Asiayone (We Burmans Association) joined the march. The marchers went from Chauk to Yenangyaung and then Magway. In Magway, Ko Ba Hein, a student union leader who had joined the protest, was arrested after he gave a defiant speech.

The march would continue to Pyay and Henzada despite arrests. Many onlookers became sympathetic to the cause of the workers as monks and other laypeople supported the strike, including one action where they lay down on the hot asphalt in front of mounted British police to protest the hot working conditions. A tricolour flag with the peacock of the Dobama Asiayone was raised by actor Mingala U Aung Maung once the marchers reached Kyopinkauk.

The march's organisation was connected and organised by member of the Dobama Asiayone. Po Hla Gyi, himself, had taken on the title Thakin, meaning "master", like other members of the Dobama Asiayone. During the march, owing to his militancy, Po Hlag Gyi became known as alawaka, or "The Ogre".

== General Strike ==
In Rangoon, Po Hla Gyi published a pamphlet called "The Strike War" (Burmese: သပိတ်စစ်ပွဲ) calling on workers to take action to address the poor lot of the majority of the country in both objective and subjective terms and noting the imbalance of wealth distribution. He use Burmese historical legends to draw similes. The pamphlet was sold at Shwedagon Pagoda to fund the strike relief effort.

Flag of the Burmah Oil Company

The strike by oilfield workers at the BOC evolved into a nationwide general strike organized by Dobama Asiayone. In Rangoon, student protesters inspired by the oil strike joined the workers' march who successfully picketed the Secretariat, the seat of the colonial government. The protesters were charged by mounted police from the Indian Imperial Police wielding batons, killing a Rangoon University student called Aung Kyaw. In Mandalay, the colonial police shot into a crowd of protesters led by Buddhist monks, killing 17 people. The movement became known as Htaung thoun ya byei ayeidawbon (the '1300 Revolution', named after the Burmese calendar year).

The strike lasted eighteen months, waning as workers either returned to work voluntarily, died of illness, or were coerced to return. The BOC ultimately yielded to some demands, but the main legacy of the revolution was the political awareness raised by such a lengthy and massive strike action.

== Legacy ==
In the ensuing crackdown, government forces killed 33 people, including the first to be killed- the student Bo Aung Kyaw. He is commemorated as the first student martyr in the country's history and 20 December, the day the he fell, is commemorated by students as Bo Aung Kyaw Day.

The 1972–1988 Myanmar kyat series commeorates the 1300 Revolution with an image of Thakin Po Hla Gyi on the obverse, and oil field workers on the reverse depicted on the 45/- note.
