= Thakin Po Hla Gyi =

Burmese labor leader

Alawaka Thakin Po Hla Gyi
- အာဠာဝက သခင် ဖိုးလှကြီး
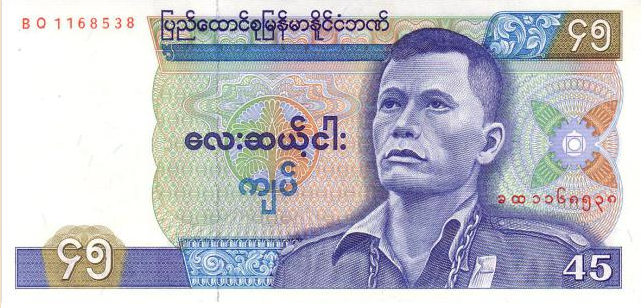

Personal details
- Born: c. 1909 Thayet Lay Bin, Magwe Division, British Burma
- Died: January/February 1943 Rangoon, Japanese Burma
- Children: Kyin Kyin Wai
- Occupation: Labour organizer
- Known for: Year 1300 Strike

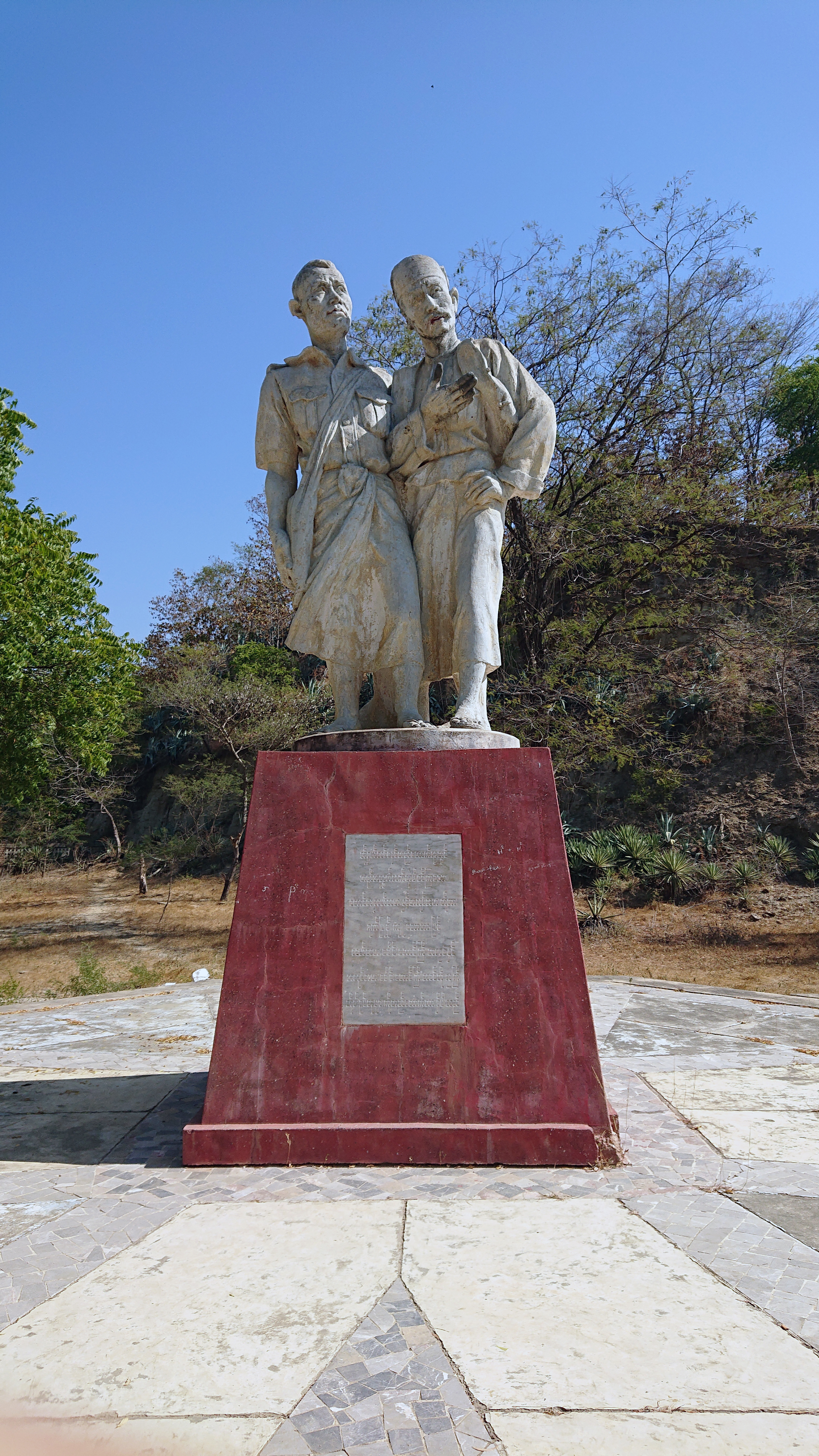
Statue of Saya San and Thakin Po Hla Gyi at Magway Township

Thakin Po Hla Gyi (Burmese: ဖိုးလှကြီး; c. 1909–1943) was a Burmese oil worker and one of the leaders of the Year 1300 Strikes against British colonial rule. The movement began in Magway in 1938 and 1939 and involved around 10,000 workers. In 1938 he wrote the pamphlet, "Thabeik Sit Pwe (The Strike War)" which was republished in 1968, and later translated into English in 2012.

== Life ==
Po Hla Gyi was born between 1908 and 1910. Like other members of the Dobama Asiayon, he took the title Thakin. In 1938, he was part of the contingent of striking miners that marched from Chauk to Rangoon in November to present their demands to the BOC. During the strike, owing to his militancy, he became known as alawaka, or “The Ogre”, He returned to Chauk in June 1939.

He died of stomach cancer at the makeshift Rangoon Public Hospital in January or February 1943. (Note: (Myint Swe 2014: 137–138): Hla Gyi died on the day he was brought to the hospital. According to the autopsy by the head surgeon Ba Than, Hla Gyi died of stomach cancer. Furthermore, while (Myint Swe 2014) does not explicitly state when Hla Gyi died, based on the preceding and following dates in the book, his death occurred between January 1943 (Myint Swe 2014: 121) and in or before February 1943 (Myint Swe 2014: 139).)

== Legacy ==
In 1987, his image was printed on the controversial 45 kyat banknote. In 2013, a statue was erected in Chauk which is a focal point of Workers' day celebrations.

== The Strike War ==
The pamphlet was a series of anti-imperialist and anti-capitalist arguments and was sold for 4 annas at Shwedagon Pagoda on October 8 and 9 to raise money for the Strike Relief Organisation. Hla Gyi describes the poor lot of the majority of the country in both objective and subjective terms and notes the imbalance of wealth distribution.

It has since become "a classic of Burmese socialist writing."

"If Burma’s riches were not in foreigners’ hands but instead equally distributed to all the Burmese people, each household would be able to get a total of about 750 kyat per year...Poor Burmese farmers get an average daily income of three annas per household. Workers get an average daily income of six annas. The total income of approximately 95 per cent of poor people is roughly calculated at only about 100 million kyat per year. The total gross domestic product of about 1.6 billion kyat is completely falling into the hands of the imperialists. The capitalists ignore us while we so visibly invest our strength working to the point of exhaustion.

Hla Gyi condemned monopoly capitalists in the fields of oil, mining and timber, as well as landlord and banking. He notes that timber extraction has led to outbreaks of malaria. He advanced a Marxist critique of the Burmah Oil company's exploitation of workers through surplus value exploitation

The workers’ share must be taken from that 80 million kyat. The value of commodities is determined according to the time worked for their production. In the labour time that must be worked in order to get 80 million kyat, calculating how much time must be worked for the capitalists’ profit and how much work time must be worked for the workers’ wages, the workers’ share is calculated at only one sixteenth. If we divide according to time, in the eight hours per day that the workers work they work only half an hour for themselves. The remaining seven and a half hours is forced work time for the capitalists to be able to extort profit. One worker gets an average of one kyat per day. Therefore, if one worker produces commodities valued at 16 kyat, he or she gets one kyat as his or her wage. The worker must produce 15 kyat for the profit of the capitalist BOC.

Hla Gyi also used Burmese historical legends to draw similes to the contemporary era.

The capitalist era that has arrived is like ancient times when virgins had to be handed over to immortal dark sorcerers, such as the dekaton, ayigyi and shinmahtee. Have these sorcerers been reborn as capitalists? Presently, these modern dark sorcerers wear the masks of capitalists and bring about the dominance of this dirty system over our great country of Burma. Those extremely boorish dark sorcerers with long hair, long beards and black robes who were able to demand any woman they wanted and who are said to have existed in ancient Bagan can be seen right here and now. In ancient times virgins had to be handed over to those dark sorcerers for a period of seven days. However, our women must be handed over to the iniquitous imperialists for as long as those imperialists so desire.

== Bibliography ==
- Khin Yi, Daw (1988), The Dobama Movement in Burma (1930–1938), Cornell University Press, p. 140
- Hla Gyi, Po (2012) [1938], Hans-Bernd Zöllner (ed.), "The Strike War", Myanmar Literature Project, translated by Stephen Campbell, Universität Passau
- Myint Swe, Wunna Kyawhtin Dr. (2014), The Japanese Era Rangoon General Hospital: Memoir of a Wartime Physician, translated by Zarny Tun (1st ed.), Yangon: Myanmar Book Centre, ISBN 978-99971-852-9-7
- Nay Aung (2 May 2017), "Oil field workers, others celebrate Workers' Day in Chauk", The Myanmar Times
