= Kyi Maung =

Myanma politician (1940–2004)

Thiri Pyanchi Colonel Kyi Maung
- ကြည်မောင်

Vice-chairman of NLD
- In office 1988–1997
- Preceded by: Office Created

Member of Revolutionary Council
- In office 1962–1963

Commander of Southwestern Command
- In office 1962–1963

Commander of Yangon Command
- In office 1960–1962

Personal details
- Born: 20 December 1920 Rangoon, British Burma
- Died: 19 August 2004 (aged 83) Yangon
- Party: National League for Democracy (1988–1997)
- Spouse: Kyi Kyi (his death)
- Relations: Po Thein (father); Ngwe Khin (mother)
- Children: 2
- Education: Rangoon University; Officers Training School
- Awards: Thiri Pyanchi

Military service
- Branch/service: Burmese Army
- Years of service: 1941–1963
- Rank: Colonel

Colonel Kyi Maung (Burmese: ကြည်မောင်, pronounced [tɕì màʊɴ]; 20 December 1920 – 19 August 2004) was a Burmese Army officer and politician. Originally a member of the military-backed Union Revolutionary Council that seized power in 1962, Kyi Maung resigned from the ruling council in 1963 after a public disagreement with General Ne Win, the leader of the council, on the military's long-term role in government. He joined the National League for Democracy, led by Aung San Suu Kyi, in 1988 and won a seat in the Hluttaw from Bahan Township in the 1990 general election. He was vice-chairman of the NLD from 1988 to 1997. He was imprisoned four times for a total of 12 years by successive military governments.

== Early life ==
Kyi Maung was born on 20 December 1920 to Ngwe Khin and her husband Po Thein in Rangoon (now Yangon), British Burma to a family of Teochew-Burmese heritage. He enrolled in Rangoon University in 1936, and became a fervent anti-colonialist. He participated in 1938 nationwide strikes and rallies against the British colonial regime. He nearly died after he was severely beaten in his head by the police on 20 December 1938, which is now commemorated as Bo Aung Kyaw Day in Myanmar. He was by his fellow student striker Aung Kyaw, who was also severely beaten by the police, until Aung Kyaw's last breath.

== Career ==
Kyi Maung was a final year student in 1941 when he left university to join the Burma Independence Army to fight the British colonial government. In 1943, he was sent to Japan for officer training school, from which he graduated in 1945. Upon return, he joined No. 5 Burma Rifles. He eventually rose to the rank of Battalion Commander when he was sent to the US for further training between 1955 and 1956. He was promoted to regional commander in 1960 when he became head of Yangon Command.

Col. Kyi Maung was one of the 18 senior officers that seized power from the democratically elected government of U Nu in 1962. Later that year, he was reassigned to Southwestern Command. In 1963, he was forced out of the army and the council after he disagreed with Gen. Ne Win, the leader of the council, regarding the military's role in government. The army continued to keep tabs on him when he retired and was put under arrest a couple of times. After being released from his seven years of confinement, he was selected to be part of the Executive Committee of the political party, National League for Democracy (NLD), which was led by Aung San Suu Kyi until her house arrest in July 1989, after which Kyi Maung became its leader. Under his leadership, the NLD won a substantial majority in the parliament during the 1990 elections. The result, however, was not officially recognized by the ruling military junta then.

Kyi Maung went to prison four times. Gen. Ne Win sent him to prison twice for a total of seven years between 1963 and 1987. He was jailed for a month in 1988 and imprisoned for five years from 1990 to 1995. He quit the NLD in 1997 over conflicting views within the party. Although the reason for his departure was never publicly made known, he reportedly "had sharp differences with Suu Kyi".

== Personal life and death ==
Kyi Maung spent much time meditating Vipassanā style. He died on 19 August 2004 at his Yangon residence. He was married to Kyi Kyi and they had two children.

== Bibliography ==
- Lee, Khoon Choy (2013). Golden Dragon and Purple Phoenix: The Chinese and Their Multi-Ethnic Descendants in Southeast Asia. World Scientific. ISBN 978-981-4383-43-1.
- "Ba Ba U Kyi Maung Remembrance (7th anniversary of his death)" (PDF). Burma National News (in Burmese). 2011-08-19. Archived from the original on 2016-03-04.
