= Department of Medical Research (Myanmar) =

- ဆေးသုတေသနဦးစီးဌာန

Department overview
- Jurisdiction: Government of Myanmar
- Headquarters: Ziwaka Road, Dagon Township, Yangon, Myanmar
- Minister responsible: Professor Dr Thet Khaing Win
- Department executive: Professor Dr Aye Aye Khin, Director General
- Parent department: Ministry of Health
- Website: www.dmr.gov.mm

Department of Medical Research (ဆေးသုတေသနဦးစီးဌာန)(DMR) is one of the departments of the Myanmar Ministry of Health that undertakes research contributing to the improvement of the health of the people of the country.
