= Bo Aung Kyaw Day =

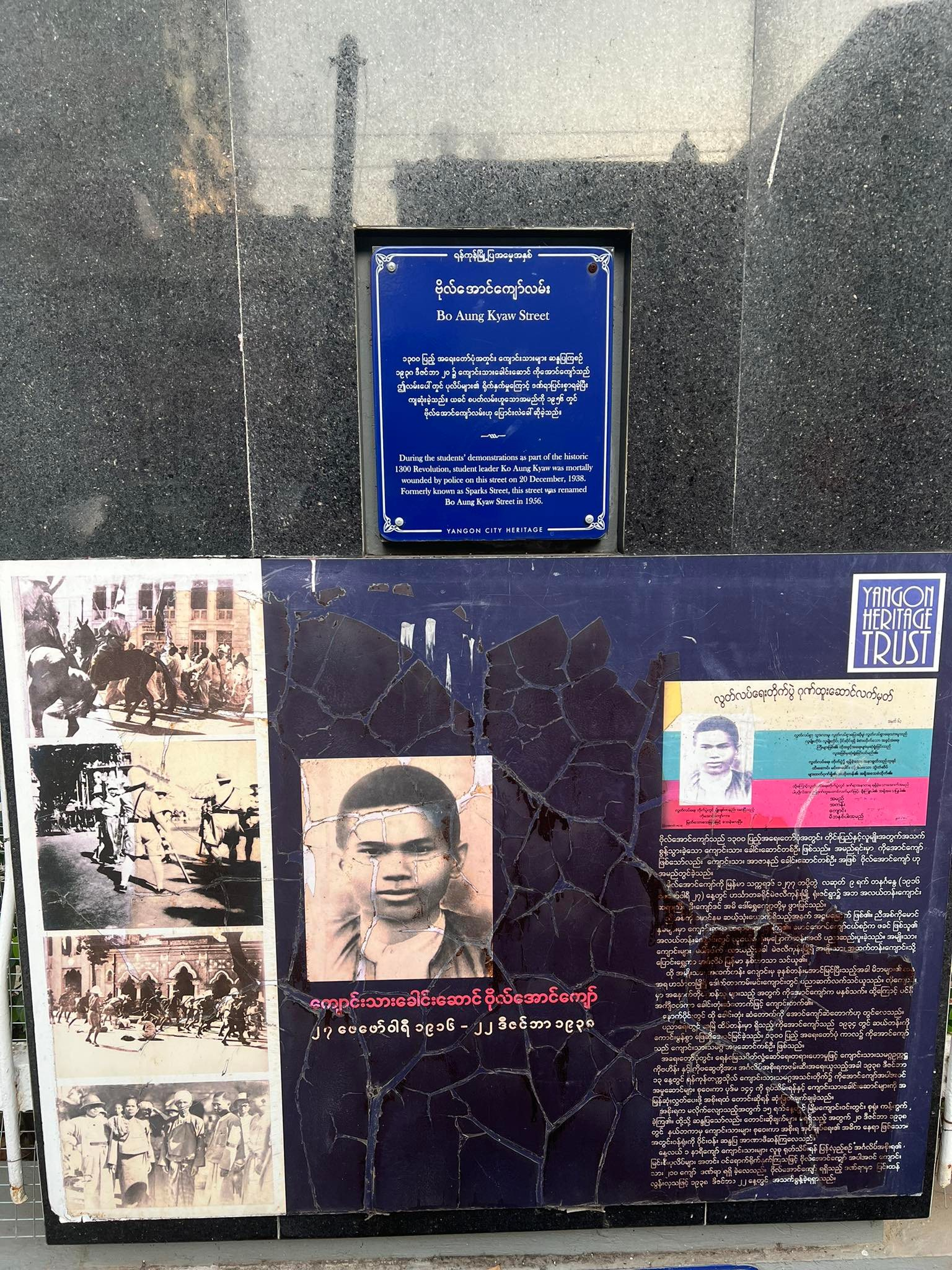
A blue plaque on Bo Aung Kyaw street commemorates and provides a brief history of the event.

On 20 December 1938, Burmese university student leader Bo Aung Kyaw (Burmese: ဗိုလ်အောင်ကျော်) was killed in a mounted police charge by the British Indian Imperial Police during the third Rangoon University student boycott. Bo Aung Kyaw Day (20 December) commemorates him as the first student leader who died in the independence struggle of Myanmar.

In December 1938, striking workers from the Chauk and Yenangyaung oilfields of the Burmah Oil Company marched to Rangoon to meet the British authorities. When the strikers reached Rangoon, they joined up with Rangoon University students who were staging their third annual protest against colonial rule. The demonstration, which blocked access to the Secretariat, the seat of the colonial government, was broken up by the Indian Imperial Police. Many students, including Kyi Maung and Aung Kyaw, received serious injuries, and the latter later succumbed to a head injury received from a police baton. Aung Kyaw was posthumously conferred the title Bo (leader) by the students.
