= Myint Swe (writer) =

Burmese physician and writer

- မြင့်ဆွေ
- Born: 25 July 1912; Thursday, 12th waxing of 2nd Waso 1274 ME; Mandalay, British Burma
- Died: 21 September 1978 (aged 66); Thursday, 5th waning of Tawthalin 1340 ME; Rangoon, Burma
- Education: Rangoon Medical College; BJMC, Ahmedabad
- Occupations: Physician, writer
- Spouse: Tin Htwe (1944–78)
- Writing career
- Pen name: Wunna Kyawhtin Dr. Myint Swe
- Period: 1967–78
- Genre: non-fiction
- Notable work: The Japanese Era Rangoon General Hospital
- Notable awards: Burma National Literature Award, 2nd Prize; Order of Independence, Third Class; Wunna Kyawhtin; Mahabhisaka

Myint Swe (Burmese: မြင့်ဆွေ, pronounced [mjɪ̰ɴ sʰwè]; 25 July 1912 – 21 September 1978) was a Burmese physician and writer. He is known for his first book and memoir, The Japanese Era Rangoon General Hospital, which chronicles the events at the only hospital in Yangon (Rangoon) open to non-Japanese during the Japanese occupation of Burma. It was a bestseller, and won the Burma National Literature Award, 2nd Prize for 1967. He published three more books though none achieved the first book's success.

Prior to his literary career, the Mandalay-born Myint Swe had led a private practice in Yangon since 1952. He served as a principal physician with the title of Mahabhisaka at the Sixth Buddhist Council (1954–56), and regularly volunteered at the main hospital for monks until 1976. For his services to the country, Myint Swe was awarded the title of Wunna Kyawhtin, and the Order of Independence (Third Class) by the Burmese government.

== Life ==
=== Early life ===
Myint Swe was born on 25 July 1912 in Mandalay, British Burma to a well-to-do family of Ma Ma Lay (မမလေး) and San Kyu (စံကြူး). His father San Kyu was a well known physician in Upper Burma, and recipient of the prestigious ATM (Ahmudan-kaung Tazeit-ya Min, အမှုထမ်းကောင်း တံဆိပ်ရ မင်း) title bestowed by the colonial government on top colonial era civil servants. The eldest of ten siblings, Myint Swe graduated from Anglo-vernacular E.W. Kelly High School, and enrolled at Mandalay College in 1932.

At the college, he quickly became ensnared in the anti-colonialist politics of the era. He became close friends with Kyaw Nyein and Thein Pe, leftist students leading the protests against the administration of the University of Rangoon, which had decided to close down its constituent college in Mandalay because of a budget shortfall. He later wrote that he was never as politically inclined as his firebrand friends, and that his only contribution was to drive Kyaw Nyein, Thein Pe and other student leaders around from protest to protest in his father's five-seater Whippet. He transferred to the University of Rangoon in 1934, and was admitted to the highly selective Rangoon Medical College (RMC) in 1935. (Note: (Myint Swe 2014: 134–135): It was exceedingly difficult to get into medical school. The class size was disproportionately small for the size of country's population (13.2 million in 1921 and 16.8 million in 1941 (per Saito and Lee 1999: 1)). Between 1922 and 1941, a grand total of 543 students graduated from RMC, or 27 new graduates on average each year. Of the grand total, the number of indigenous Burmese graduates was only 228 (42%), or less than a dozen each year. Myint Swe (Myint Swe 2014: xii) charged that the "small medical system was run mainly by foreigners and the tiny elite for foreigners and the tiny elite.") Yet he was expelled from school just a year later after getting into a public feud with a British lecturer who he felt had repeatedly denigrated the Burmese. (Note: (Myint Swe 2010: 20–21): According to his schoolmate E Maung, later Professor at Rangoon University and Chief Justice of the Supreme Court, Myint Swe had a famous run-in with a British lecturer in Pathology because he would not stand for the lecturer's blatant condescension toward Burmese students.) He was readmitted to RMC only in 1939, and was a final-year student in March 1942 when the incoming Japanese invasion closed down the school.

=== World War II era ===
Myint Swe was one of the few privileged elite who did not flee with the retreating British. The non-graduate became a Resident Medical Officer at the newly opened BIA Hospital (located at the former Diocesan School, modern War Office Building) in April 1942 only because of a severe staff shortage. The makeshift hospital, later renamed the Rangoon Public General Hospital and led by one Dr. Ba Than, became the only hospital open to non-Japanese patients. (The Japanese had taken over the Rangoon General Hospital compound, and did not admit any non-Japanese there.) Even the top Burmese politicians and military men as well as the leaders of the Indian National Army had to use the makeshift hospital run by a few remaining physicians.

As a result, he encountered several historically important people at the hospital, including Aung San, Ne Win, Bo Letya, Bo Setkya, Thakin Than Tun, Thakin Mya, Ba Cho, Kyaw Nyein, S. C. Bose, and J. R. Bhonsle. According to Myint Swe, he played a small part in the courtship between Aung San and Khin Kyi, a senior nurse at the hospital. At the beginning of the courtship, Aung San used to bring him and Bo Letya along to Khin Kyi's apartment at the hospital; Myint Swe's function was to play the violin while Khin Kyi sang the hits of the day. During the visits, the avid violinist also befriended his future wife Tin Htwe, an operating room nurse and a roommate of Khin Kyi and Khin Gyi. He earned his LMP (Licensed Medical Practitioner) degree from the wartime Medical College in 1943, and became an Assistant Medical Officer.

=== Postwar career ===
After the war, Myint Swe worked at the Rangoon General Hospital, now back at the prewar location, for four years. In 1949, he went to school in Ahmedabad for further education, and received his MBBS degree in 1951. He then started a private practice in 1952 in Yangon. He was one of the principal physicians with the title of Mahabhisaka caring for the health of the monks at the Sixth Buddhist Council (1954–56). While leading a successful private practice, he continued to see patients in poor sections of the Irrawaddy delta, and volunteered at the Kaba Aye Sangha Hospital and the Sasana Yeiktha from 1956 to 1976.

He published his first book about the Japanese era public hospital in 1967. It was both a commercial and critical success. He published three more books although none matched the first book's success. For his services to the country, he was awarded the title of Wunna Kyawhtin by the Burmese government in 1961. He was also awarded the Order of Independence, Third Class (Mawgun Win) for his contributions to the independence movement.

He died on 21 September 1978 at age 66. He was survived by his wife Tin Htwe and their five children: May Thinn Swe, Myo Swe, Nu Nu Swe, Ni Ni Swe and Thit Thit Swe.

== Literary career ==
Myint Swe began his literary career late in his life. He wrote in his first book that he had always recounted the stories at the wartime hospital to countless friends and colleagues over the years, and that upon the repeated urging of Myint Oo, editor of Shaytho Magazine, he began writing his first book in 1966. It was a bestseller, and won the Burma National Literature Award, 2nd Prize for 1967. The First Prize went to Withaytha Taing Thamaing A-Sa by his Mandalay College classmate Thein Pe Myint.

=== Books ===
- Hmat-Mi-Thay-De Japan Khit Hsay-Yon-Gyi-We (1967)

- 1st edition, in English as weekly serials in The Working People's Daily (1967–68?) (Note: (Myint Swe 2014: vii): The first English translation of the book by Khin Swe Hla appeared in The Working People's Daily as weekly serials starting in October 1967. But the serials ended after a short period without having covered the entire book.)
- 2nd edition, 1st printing (1968)
- 2nd edition, 2nd printing (2010)
- 2nd edition, in English (2014)
- 2nd edition, 3rd printing (2015)

- Doctor Yan Ku, Me Yan Pyu (1970)
- Ne-Che-Khit A-Sa Sayawun Bawa (1971)
- Bawa Pyetthana (c. 1974)

=== Articles ===
- History of Rangoon General Hospital, Myawaddy Magazine (June 1968)

== Bibliography ==
- Myint Swe, Wunna Kyawhtin Dr. (2010). Hmat-Mi-Thay-De Japan Khit Hsay-Yon-Gyi We (in Burmese) (2nd, 2nd printing ed.). Yangon: Zabe Oo.
- Myint Swe, Wunna Kyawhtin Dr. (2014). The Japanese Era Rangoon General Hospital: Memoir of a Wartime Physician. Translated by Zarny Tun (1st ed.). Yangon: Myanmar Book Centre. ISBN 978-99971-852-9-7.
- Saito, Teruko; Lee, Kin Kiong (1999). Saito Teruko (ed.). Statistics on the Burmese Economy: The 19th and 20th Centuries. Institute of Southeast Asian Studies. ISBN 978-98123-003-1-7.
- Zaw Win Tun (12 September 2015). "Bogyoke Aung San Taing-Bin-Ge-De Luzo: Wunna Kyawhtin Dr. Myint Swe". The Sun Rays News Journal (in Burmese). 1 (64). Yangon.
