= Saw Sa =

Burmese physician, politician and missionary

Saw Sa စောဆ FRCS MBE
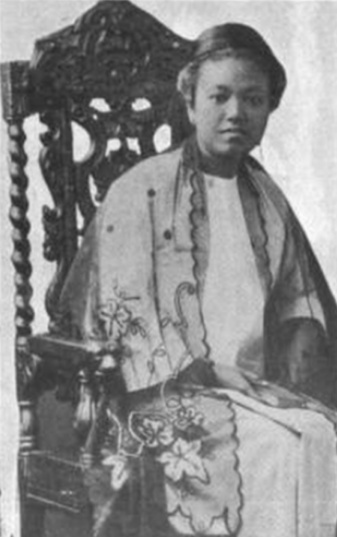
- Saw Sa in a 1922 publication

Personal details
- Born: 1 August 1884; Friday, 10th waxing of Wagaung 1246 ME Prome (Pyay), British Burma
- Died: 28 February 1962 (aged 77); Wednesday, 9th waning of Tabodwe 1323 ME Rangoon (Yangon), Burma
- Education: University of Calcutta (MB); Royal College of Surgeons in Ireland (FRCS)
- Occupation: Physician, hospital administrator, government official

Saw Sa FRCS MBE (Burmese: စောဆ, pronounced [sɔ́ sʰa̰]; also known as Saw Hsa, Ma Saw Sa, Daw Saw Sa; 1 August 1884 – 28 February 1962) was a Burmese physician, midwife, hospital administrator, Christian missionary, suffragist, and government official. Dr. Saw Sa was the first Burmese woman to earn an advanced medical degree, and the first woman to serve in the upper house of the colonial parliament.

== Early life ==
Saw Sa was the daughter of Burmese Christian parents. Her father Po Saw was a government official (wundauk) of Prome. She was the first woman to graduate from the Baptist-run Judson College in Rangoon, British Burma. She received a missionary scholarship to attend medical college in Calcutta, where she became the first Burmese woman to earn a medical license, in 1911. She gained further training in public health at the Royal College of Physicians and Surgeons in Dublin, where she was "the first Burmese student to win a fellowship".

== Medical career and mission activities ==
Saw Sa was said to be the only woman physician in Burma when she returned to Rangoon in 1913. From 1914 to 1921, she was superintendent of the Lady Dufferin Maternity Hospital in Rangoon. Her sister and cousins were among the hospital's nurses. She published a textbook, Midwifery (1921). After 1921, she had a private medical practice in Rangoon, and ran a charity hospital. During World War II, she treated war casualties.

In 1921, Saw Sa traveled to the United States. She attended the Woman's American Baptist Foreign Missionary Society's gathering in Des Moines, Iowa, representing the organization's work in India and Burma. The convention goers gave her a "book shower" of about 800 English-language volumes and magazine subscriptions to carry back to mission school students in Rangoon. She served on the International Missionary Council when it met at Lake Mohonk, New York. She pursued further studies in medicine at Johns Hopkins University. She was said to be the first Burmese woman to "make a trip around the world".

== Politics ==
Saw Sa served on the executive committee of the All-Burma Baptist Woman's Missionary Society, when it formed in 1926. In 1927, she served on the Burma Local Committee of the seventh congress of the Far Eastern Association Of Tropical Medicine. In 1934, she spoke in favor of married women's suffrage in Burma, at the Women's Freedom League Club in London, and while she was a delegate at meetings about Burma's administrative separation from India under British colonial rule. "We claim wifehood franchise for the wives of all men who vote on other qualifications," she declared, adding "On the principle of equal status with men, we are not at all in favour of having seats reserved for women." In 1937, Saw Sa was elected to the upper house of the Burmese Senate, its first woman legislator.

Dr. Saw Sa was appointed a Member of the Order of the British Empire on 3 June 1935.

== Personal life ==
Saw Sa died on 28 February 1962; she was 77 (in her 78th year).

== Bibliography ==
- The India Office and Burma Office List 1945, London: His Majesty's Stationery Office, 1945
