= Yangon Central Women's Hospital =

Coordinates: 16°46′53.48″N 96°8′30.43″E

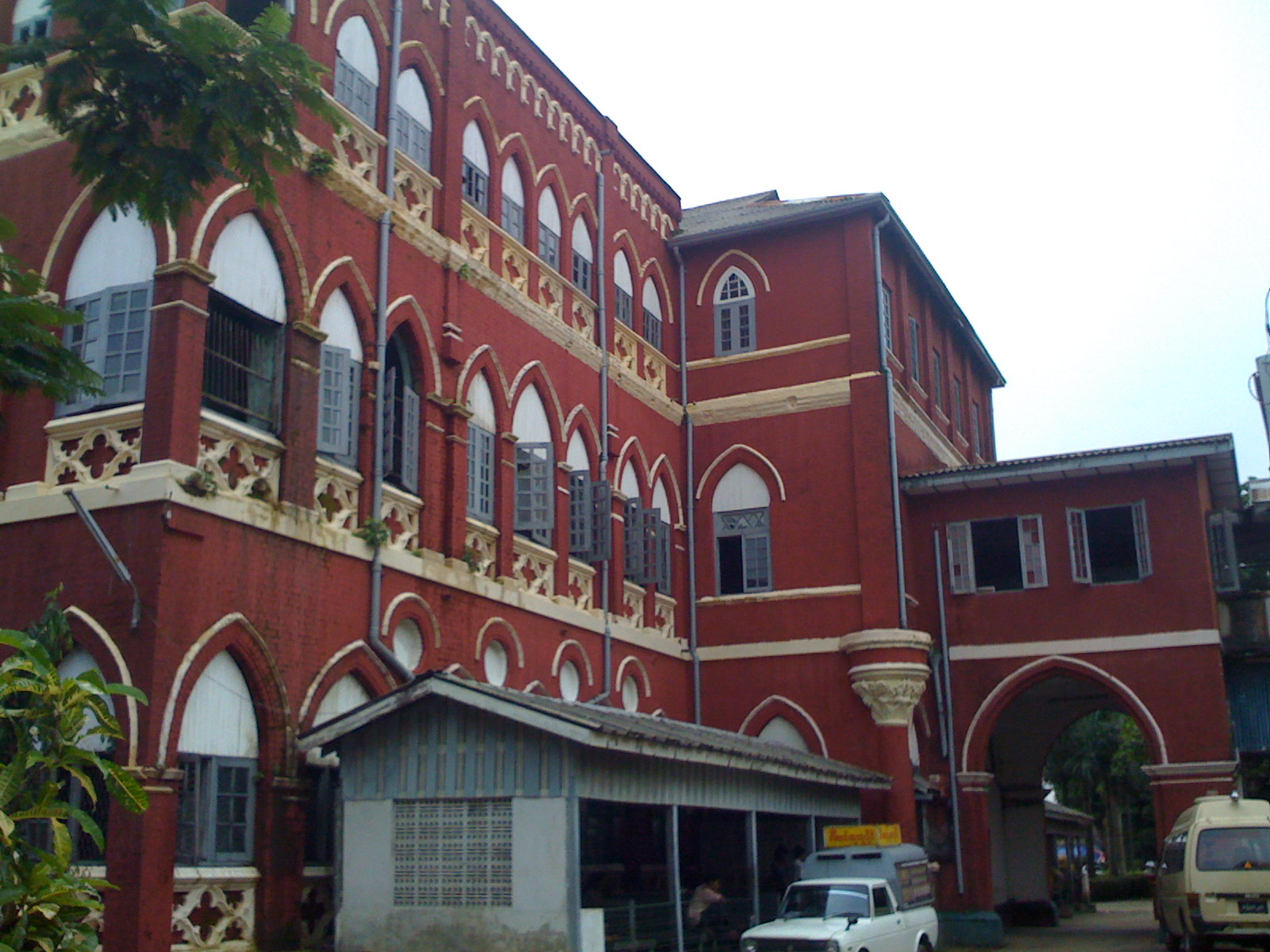
- Building D of Central Women's Hospital

Geography
- Location: Min Ye Kyawswa Street, Lanmadaw 11131, Yangon, Yangon Division, Myanmar

Organisation
- Type: Teaching
- Affiliated university: University of Medicine 1, Yangon

Services
- Emergency department: Yes
- Beds: 750

History
- Founded: 1887

Links
- Lists: Hospitals in Myanmar

Designations

Yangon City Landmark

The Yangon Central Women's Hospital (Burmese: ရန်ကုန် ဗဟို အမျိုးသမီး ဆေးရုံ) is a public hospital in Yangon, Myanmar. It is also a tertiary care teaching hospital of the University of Medicine 1, Yangon, the Yangon Institute of Nursing, and the University of Paramedical Science, Yangon.

== History ==
The hospital was formerly known as "Dufferin Hospital", after Hariot Hamilton-Temple-Blackwood, Marchioness of Dufferin and Ava.

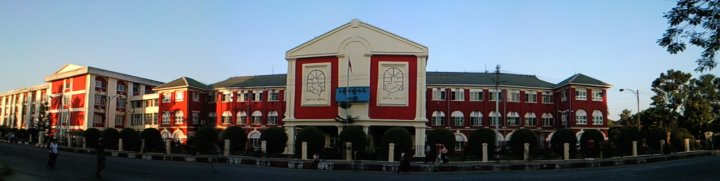
Panoramic view of Yangon Central Women's Hospital Buildings A and E

The foundation stone of the first building, subsequently used as an administrative block, was laid by Lady Dufferin in 1898. "A" Block was built in 1925. The hospital was subsequently handed over to the Burmese government and the hospital committee agreed to attach the hospital to the medical college.

In 1929, "B" Block and "C" Block were built. It was necessary to admit gynaecology patients for the teaching of medical students.

In 1940 the bed strength of the hospital was increased to 200 with 150 beds for neonates.

During the Second World War, the hospital was occupied by the army and the building was returned to the government in 1945.

In 1959 the blood bank and X-ray department were opened.

In 1962 Outpatients Department was opened in a new building on Kemendine (Kyimyindine) Road.

In 1963 the number of beds was increased to 500, with 250 for neonates. The name of the hospital was changed to Central Maternity Hospital.
