= Yangon General Hospital =

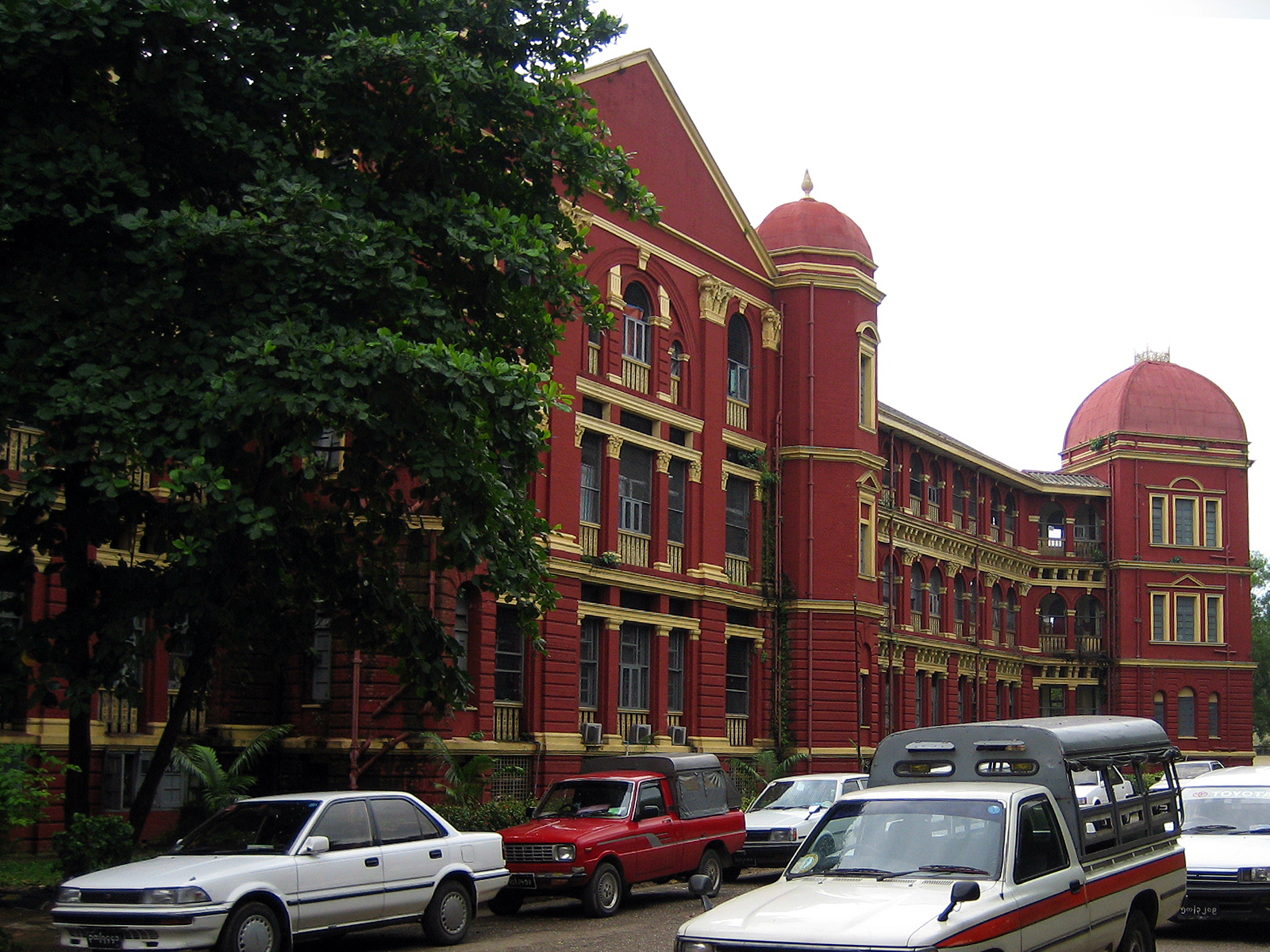

Geography
- Location: Lanmadaw 11131, Yangon, Yangon Region, Myanmar
- Coordinates: 16°46′44″N 96°08′53″E

Organisation
- Type: Teaching
- Affiliated university: University of Medicine 1, Yangon

Services
- Emergency department: Yes
- Beds: 2000

History
- Founded: 1899

Links
- Website: yghhealthcare.org
- Lists: Hospitals in Myanmar

Designations

Yangon City Landmark

The Yangon General Hospital (YGH, Burmese: ရန်ကုန် ပြည်သူ့ ဆေးရုံကြီး) is a major public hospital in a 14-hectare (35-acre) compound in Yangon, Myanmar. The 2,000-bed hospital consists of seven medical wards, three surgical wards, two trauma and orthopaedic wards, and 28 specialist departments for inpatient care. The hospital also runs an ER for general medicine, general surgery and traumatology.

== History ==
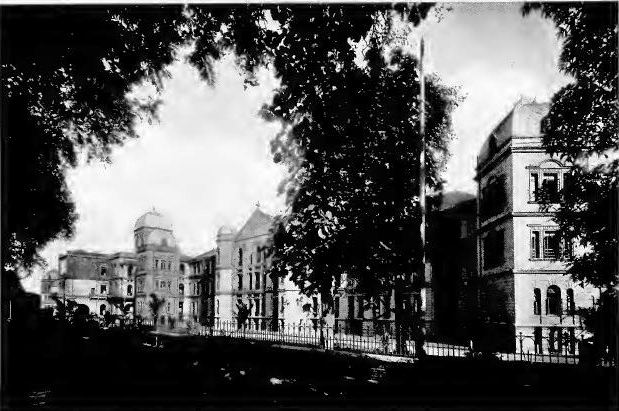
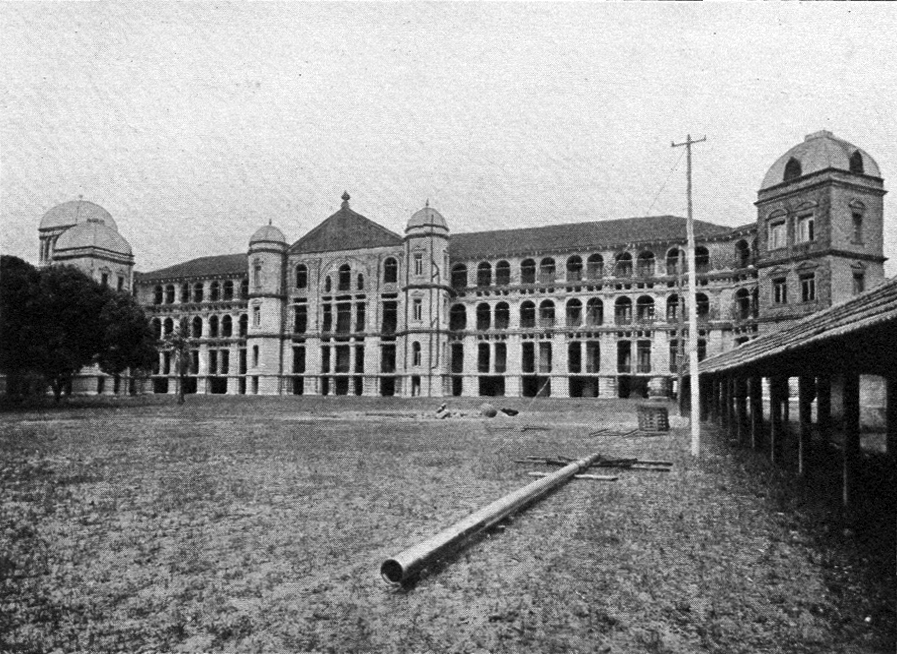
The front (left) and rear (right) view of newly constructed General Hospital

=== Early history ===
In the early 1890s, the Agri-Horticultural Gardens and the Phayre Museum occupied the present site of Yangon General Hospital.

The Yangon General Hospital was established in 1899 as the Rangoon General Hospital (RGH).

The main building was designed by the head of the Public Works Department, Henry Hoyne-Fox, and construction started in 1904 and took five years to complete. It was fitted with all the latest modern medical improvement at that time, including operating theatres with electricity and anesthesia rooms. The 3-story Victorian-style main building was opened on 6 May 1905.

In the following year, the administrative block and other structures, such as the Matron's accommodation and the morgue, were added and cost four million rupees overall. In 1911, the new and larger hospital opened its doors for the first time with a total of 342 beds. It also housed the country's first bacteriological laboratory, through which several contributions to global medical science were made during the early 20th century.

=== World War II ===
During the Japanese Occupation of Burma, the Imperial Japanese Army occupied the buildings and reserved them for Japanese personnel; the General Hospital had to temporarily relocate to the former Diocesan Girls' School on Signal Pagoda Road.

=== After World War II ===
After World War II, the hospital was renovated and had a capacity of 546 beds. In 1964, new specialist wards were added, and the capacity was increased to 1500 beds.

The building was a major massacre site during the 8888 Uprising, in which injured patients, assumed to have taken part in the anti-government protests, were killed by the Tatmadaw. The hospital is closed to tourists. The hospital was also the site of Aung San Suu Kyi's first public speech, on 24 August 1988. The hospital was listed on the Yangon City Heritage List in 2017.

== Services and specialties provided ==
The hospital has around 2,000 staff. As of July 2018, the hospital has 2,000 beds and generally treats 1,800 inpatients and between 800 and 1,200 outpatients a day.

Although public healthcare is nominally free, patients do have to pay for some medicine that is not provided by the Ministry of Health.

=== Departments ===
YGH maintains both medical and surgical specialist departments and diagnostic departments.

==== Specialist departments ====
- Department of Cardiovascular Medicine (Ward 20)
- Department of Cardiovascular Surgery (Ward 19)
- Department of Clinical Haematology
- Department of Dermatology
- Department of Diabetes and Endocrinology (Ward 15+16)(Attached with General Medical Unit 2B (Ward 13+14))
- Department of Emergency Medicine
- Department of Anaesthesiology and Intensive Care Medicine
- Department of Hand and Reconstructive Microsurgery (Ward (3+4))
- Department of Neurology
- Department of Neurosurgery
- Department of Gastroenterology
- Department of Geriatrics (Ward 9+10)(Attached with General Medical Unit 3B (Ward 7+8))
- Department of Medical Oncology
- Department of Plastic, Maxillofacial & Oral Surgery
- Department of Physical Medicine & Rehabilitation
- Department of Radiation Oncology
- Department of Tropical and Infectious Diseases (Attached with General Medical Unit 1B)
- General Medical Units (1A, 2A (Ward 17+18), 3A (Ward 11+12)& 4)
- General Surgical Units (1, 2 & 3)
- Trauma care units (1 (Ward 1+2) & 2 (Ward 5+6))
- Intensive Care Cardiovascular Unit (Cardiac Intensive Care Unit and Coronary Care Unit (CCU)) (Ward 20)
- Diagnostic and Therapeutic Cardiovascular Catheterisation Laboratories
- Operation Theatre Complex
- Arrhythmias Clinic
- Special Skin Clinic
- STD Clinic
- National TB Programme
- Diabetic Clinic
- Dentistry Clinic
- Mental Health Clinic
- Acute Burn Care Unit
- Epilepsy Unit
- Isolation Ward
- Pain and Palliative Care Unit

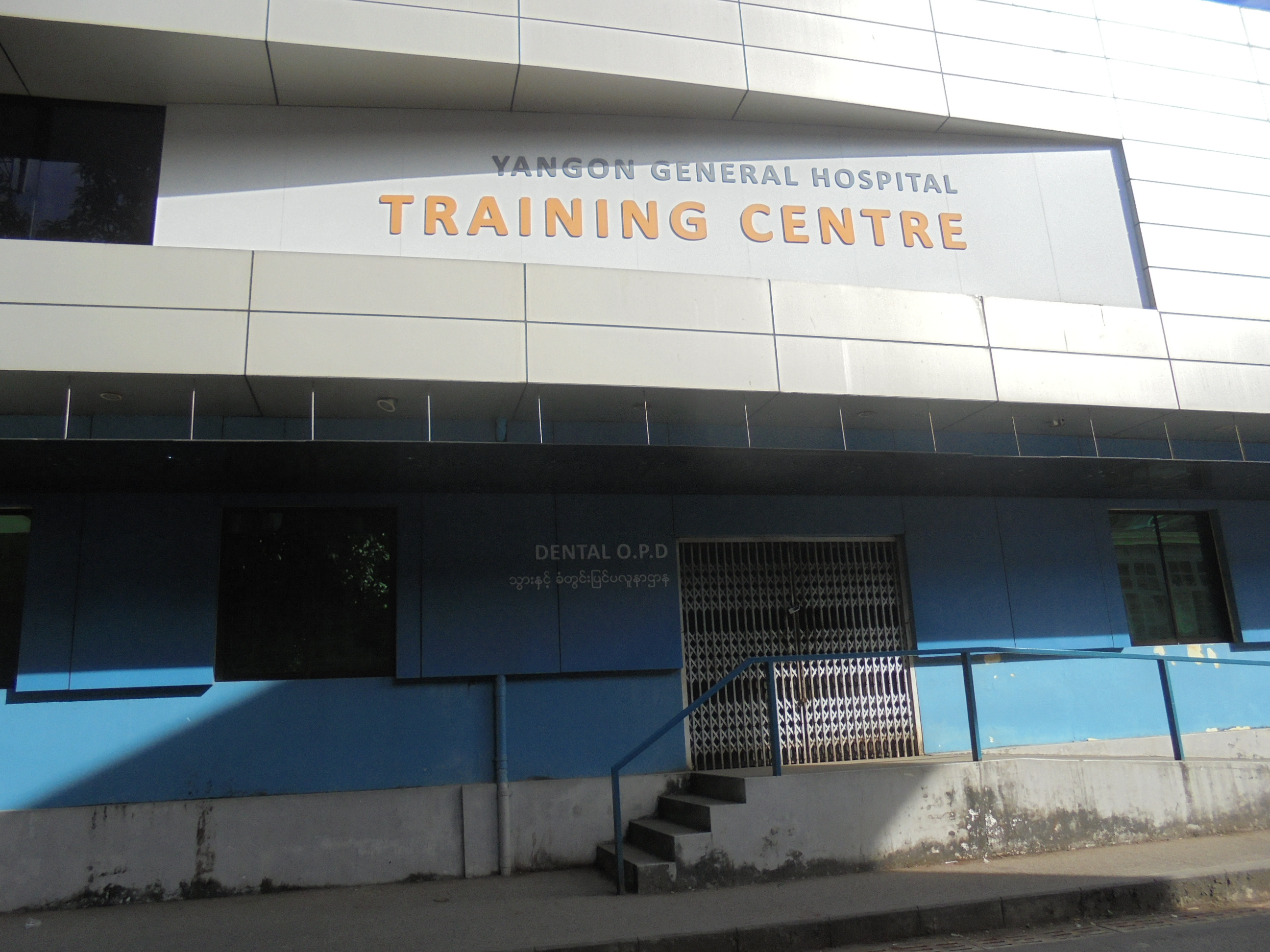
Dental O.P.D (Out Patient Department)

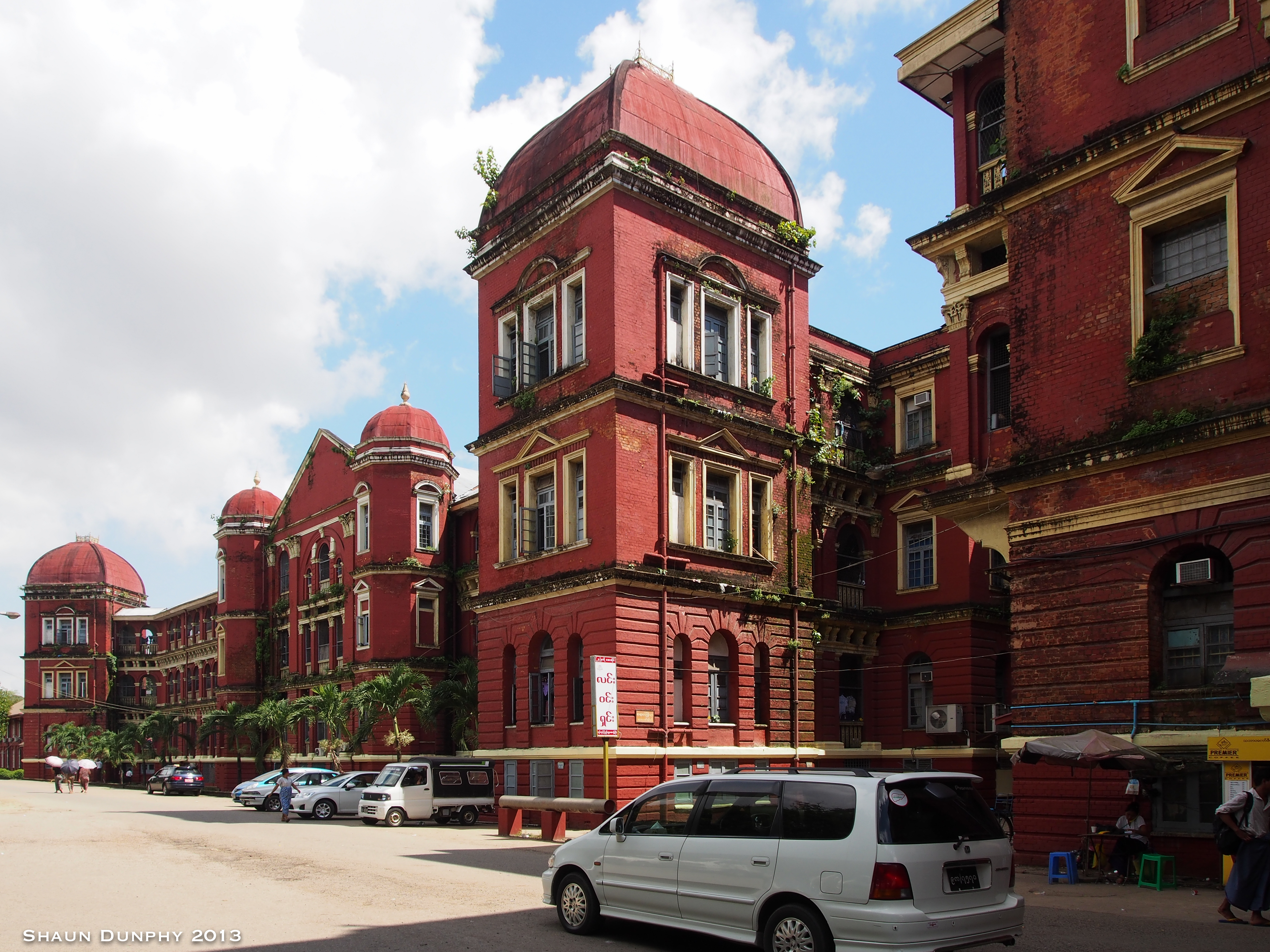

==== Diagnostics departments ====
- Department of Radiology (MRI, 24 hr CT scan service, Xray, USS)
- Department of Pathology
- Department of Microbiology
- Department of Nuclear Medicine
- Diagnostic Cardiovascular Catheterisation Laboratories
- Non-invasive Cardiovascular Diagnostic Lab
- National Endoscopy Centre
- Neuroelectrophyisological Centre

==== Auxiliary departments ====
- Department of Forensic Medicine
- National Blood Bank
- Medical Record Department
- Bio-Medical Engineering Department
- Kitchen
- Laundry
- Motor Transport

== Clinical training and nursing education ==
YGH is the Tertiary Care Teaching Hospital of University of Medicine 1, Yangon, the Yangon Institute of Nursing, and the University of Medical Technology, Yangon. In particular, it is the main teaching hospital of the University of Medicine 1, Yangon.

== Research and other medical and academic collaborations ==
- Australia–Myanmar Trauma Management Program: From 2015 to 2017, this program gave trauma care team training to Myanmar clinicians.

== See also ==
- List of hospitals in Yangon
