= Medical universities in Myanmar =

There are five civil medical universities and one military medical academy in Myanmar (formerly Burma). All medical schools are recognised by Myanmar Medical Council and State Government. They are:

- University of Medicine 1, Yangon
- University of Medicine 2, Yangon
- University of Medicine, Mandalay
- University of Medicine, Magway
- University of Medicine, Taunggyi
- NayPyiTaw State Academy (NSA)
- Defence Services Medical Academy

All medical universities in Myanmar offer the undergraduate MBBS degree (Bachelor of Medicine, Bachelor of Surgery).

== University of Medicine-1, Yangon ==
University of Medicine-1, Yangon
- Motto: Service, Sympathy, Humanity
- Type: Public
- Established: 1920
- Undergraduates: 600
- Location: Yangon, Yangon Division, Burma
- Campus: Urban
- Website: http://www.um1ygn.edu.mm/

The University of Medicine-1, formerly the Institute of Medicine-1, is the oldest of four medical institutions in Myanmar. The students of four medical universities are selected from the candidates, who pass with the highest science scores in the matriculation examination of Myanmar. The university offers an M.B.B.S. equivalent of the M.D. degree. The University of Medicine-1 has three major campuses: (1) Lanmadaw Township campus, (2) Pyay Road campus, and (3) Thaton Road campus. UM(1)is training 600 doctors every year and 73 postgraduate courses.

=== History ===
A course in medical science was first introduced in Burma in 1923-24 at Rangoon College, on the premises of the Rangoon General Hospital. In 1929, the classes were moved to the present building in Lanmadaw Township, the foundation of which was laid by Sir Harcourt Butler, on 2 February 1927. The medical college became a constituent college of the University of Rangoon in 1930.

From 1942 to 1945, during the World War II, there was a temporary suspension of the M.B., B.S. course. A modified course was conducted instead, on the successful completion of which the Licentiate of the State Medical Board (LSMB) was conferred. Although the medical college building remained intact, all the laboratory equipment, and all the mounts and specimens collected in the Pathology and Forensic Medicine Department Museums were completely destroyed, and valuable books from the College library were also lost.

After the war, all the constituent colleges of the reconstituted Rangoon University became Faculties, and the Medical College became the Faculty of Medicine, under the administration of the Dean.

On promulgation of the University Education Act in May, 1964, the Institutes of Medicine were established. In 1973, the administration of the three medical Institutes and the Institute of Dental Medicine was transferred to the Ministry of Health, and came under the direct control of the Department of Medical Education, now known as the Department of Health Manpower.

Post-graduate courses were instituted at the three Institutes of Medicine in 1964, the Dean of the courses being responsible to the Rector for their organization and administration. With the addition of new courses in 1970, the Board of Postgraduate Medical Studies came under the administration of the Director. With the institution of the Department of Medical Education in 1973, the Board has been under the direct charge of the Director-General of the Department of Medical Education, now known as the Department of Health Manpower.

=== Courses offered and degree awarded ===
The M.B. and B.S. course work extends over seven years.

Year	Duration
Foundation Year	1 year
Medical Year 1	1 year
Medical Year 2	1 year
Medical Year 3	1 year
Medical Year 4	1 year
Medical Year 5	1 year
House Surgeon	1 year
Total	7 years

=== Subjects taught ===
First M.B., B.S.

Language & Communication

  - Burmese
  - English
  - Mathematics & statistics
  - Physics
  - Chemistry
  - Botany
  - Zoology
  - Traditional Medicine (30 hours)

Second M.B., B.S.

  - Anatomy
  - Medical Physiology
  - Medical Biochemistry

Third M.B., B.S.

  - General pathology
  - Microbiology
  - Pharmacology

Students are also posted for six months each to the medical and surgical wards for clinical training.

Final M.B., B.S. Part I

  - Forensic Medicine
  - Preventive and Social Medicine (with three weeks residential field training in the rural areas)
  - Systemic Pathology and haematology

Students attend lectures and clinics in medicine, surgery, child health, obstetrics & gynecology, and are posted to the various teaching hospitals, including posting in Departments of Preventive and Social Medicine for visiting urban health facilities.

Final M.B., B.S. Part II

  - Child Health
  - Medicine
  - Obstetrics & Gynecology
  - Surgery

Students are bound to classroom study in the first six months while they are rotated in the allied specialties, namely, eye, ear, nose & throat diseases, urology, neurology, tuberculosis, venereal diseases, orthopedics and traumatology, skin diseases, mental health and psychiatry, oro-maxillo-facial surgery, radiology, radiotherapy, nuclear medicine, anesthesiology, thoracic surgery, and paediatric surgery. Students are attached to hospitals in later one year while studying in clinical rotations.

A summative examination is held at the end of the Final M.B., B.S. Part II course. Problem Based Learning (PBL), Community Based Learning (CBL) and Behavioural Science will be incorporated, as relevant, in the M.B., B.S. course.

House Surgeon Training

All students, upon successful completion of the Final Part II examination, continue to receive hands-on training for a period of one year as house surgeons in one of the recognized Teaching Hospitals in Yangon and / or the state and division hospitals. Training periods are as follows:

Subject	Duration
Child Health	2.5 months
Community Medicine	2 weeks
Medicine (including Psychiatry)	3 months
Obstetrics & Gynaecology	3 months
Surgery (including Traumatology)	3 months

- MB., B.S. Degree was conferred to the candidates a year after the final part II examination in the past, but is only after completion of House-Surgeon ship nowadays.

=== Improvements and changes ===
M.B., B.S. Course (1930)

Yangon University passed a new curriculum for the M.B., B.S. degree course with a slight alteration in program structure of 1923 curriculum. There was no change in the 1st M.B., course. The teaching of Physical and Organic chemistry in second M.B. course was shortened to six months.

The 3rd M.B., B.S. course was of one-year duration and consisted of:

- Materia medica and Pharmacology
- General and Special Pathology including Medical Zoology and Bacteriology
- Morbid Anatomy including attendance to all post-mortem examination for three months.
- Morbid Histology
- Elementary Bacteriology and Medical Zoology
- Clinical clerkship

The final M.B., B.S. course was two years and it was divided into two parts (the Final Part I and the Final Part II M.B., B.S.).

The subjects taught in the Final Part I course were:

- Forensic Medicine (including medico-legal post-mortem examination)
- Hygiene and vaccination (including Practical Hygiene)

The examination was held at the end of one year.

The course leading to Part II of the final M.B., B.S. examination was as follows:

- Systemic Medicine
- Systemic Surgery
- Systemic Midwifery
- Applied anatomy and physiology
- Outpatient clerkship - 4 months
- Special Departments

Three months - Eye, Ear, Nose and Throat Two months - Venereal Diseases & Skin

- Maternity Hospital - 3 months
- Clinical clerkship in medicine & Surgery

To fulfil the regulation of General Medical Council of Great Britain the instructions on child welfare, prenatal care and causes of excessive infantile mortality had to be included.

The candidate who failed in any one of the M.B., B.S. examinations could transfer himself to L.M. & S. course, if desired to do so. But candidates who had passed the L.M. & S. course were not granted any concession to enable them to follow a modified course leading to the degree of M.B., B.S.

The General Medical Council of Great Britain was again requested to reconsider the University's application for the recognition of its M.B., B.S. Degree as registrable qualification in Great Britain. The Committee of the General Medical Council informed the University that it was not expedient or just to accede to the request of the University.

M.B., B.S. Course (1935–36)

The prospectus of the Medical College of the University of Rangoon (1935–1936) stated that the duration of M.B., B.S. course was seven years (previously six years) from the time of matriculation - two years of pre-medical and five years of medical studies proper.

A candidate for admission into Medical College, had to pass the First M.B., B.S. course that normally extended over two years or one of the examinations recognized by the General Medical Council of Great Britain as prerequisite education.

There was no change in Second M.B., B.S. course but the subjects taught in clinical years were rearranged as follows:

The Third M.B., B.S.

- Materia Medica & Pharmacology
- Bacteriology & Medical Zoology

The Final Part I M.B., B.S.

- Pathology
- Forensic Medicine
- Hygiene and Public health

The Final Part II M.B., B.S.

- Medicine
- Surgery
- Obstetrics & Gynaecology

In the previous curriculum, Bacteriology and Medical Zoology were taught under Pathology in Third M.B., B.S. course. The teaching of Pathology was carried out in the Final Part I in 1935-36 curriculum.

Some of the rules for the students stated that the students who were absent without leave would be removed from the college and no student would be allowed to sit for a University Examination unless his attendance, work and conduct had been certified to be satisfactory by the Professor or Lecturer in each subject for which the student was appearing for the examination.

During the three years of clinical study, (i.e. starting from Third M.B., B.S.) the students had to work in the outpatient departments and the wards of the Rangoon General Hospital, and attend post-mortem examinations, clinics and surgical operations. They performed clinical duties under the supervision of the members of the staff of hospital who were also staff of the Medical College. The students were posted for a period of continuous duty at the Dufferin Hospital for training in Obstetrics and Gynaecology. The course of medical study was planned to conform to the requirements of the General Medical Council of Great Britain.

After passing the Final part II examination one could register as a medical practitioner with the Burma Medical Council. The M.B., B.S. degree was registrable in India and Burma. It was also anticipated that registration in Great Britain could be made in the near future.

The internship was not compulsory but the graduates were strongly recommended to spend a year at least as a House-physician or Surgeon in a well equipped hospital in order to gain experience and confidence in solving the problems that may be encountered in general practice. Only about ten posts were available a year in selected Civil General Hospitals in Burma. They were given an allowance of Rs.75/- per month.

The majority of graduates entered the private practice. Few posts were available in the Government Service; the Burma Railways, the Corporation of Rangoon and certain large commercial enterprises such as the Burmah Oil Co., the Irrawaddy Flotilla Co., Burma Corporation, Indo-Burma Petroleum Co. The initial pay ranged from Rs.200/- to Rs.400/- per month according to the nature of the duties and qualification of the applicants.

== University of Medicine, Mandalay ==
The University of Medicine, Mandalay (formerly called Institute of Medicine, Mandalay) is one of four medical schools in Myanmar. Unlike most tertiary education institutes, the Institute of Medicine is operated and managed by the Ministry of Health. The Institute of Medicine, Mandalay admits approximately 600 students annually, on the basis of scores from their Basic Education High School Examination (in science). Diplomas offered are M.B., B.S. (US equivalent of M.D.)

=== History ===
The Institute of Medicine, Mandalay was first founded as a branch of the Faculty of Medicine, of Mandalay University. In 1955, it relocated to its present site in Chanayethazan Township in Mandalay.

The departments were established in phases. Departments of Anatomy and Physiology in 1954, Departments of Pharmacology, Pathology, Bacteriology, Medicine and Surgery in 1956, and Departments of Obstetrics and Gynecology, Forensic Medicine and the Eye, Ear, Nose and Throat in 1957. On the first of July 1958 The Branch Faculty of Medicine became the Faculty of Medicine, Mandalay. The microbiology department was established in 1960. In 1964 the Faculty of Medicine was upgraded to the Institute of Medicine, Mandalay and the department of child health was established in the same year. The new system of medical education was implemented since 1964 and premedical courses were started with the establishment of departments of Myanmar, English, Chemistry, Physics, Zoology and Botany in the First M.B., B.S class. The department of biochemistry was established as a separate entity in 1987. Finally the department of orthopedics was created in 1990. The foundation stone of the present building complex was laid in 1983 and its construction has been completed in 1991.

Initially, the Mandalay General Hospital was one of the teaching hospitals of the Institute such as 300 bedded hospital, worker's hospital. At present, No. 1 Base Military Hospital of Pyin U Lwin, Mandalay Workers Hospital, five specialty hospitals in Mandalay and five state and divisional general hospitals, and recently, Mandalay 300-bed Teaching Hospital — altogether thirteen hospitals are now affiliated to the Institute.

The Institute started with an intake of thirty-six undergraduate students which has now increased to about 700-1000 per year. Postgraduate courses were started in 1968 with master's degree programs in Physiology. The Institute is now conducting twelve diploma courses, nineteen master's degree courses, eleven doctor of medical science courses and seven Ph.D. courses.

The head of the Mandalay university is Professor Prof Myo Thet Tin since May 2021.

=== Course ===
The whole course is the same as the major course of University of Medicine-1, Yangon.

== Defence Services Medical Academy (DSMA) ==
Defense Services Medical Academy (DSMA)
- တပ်မတော် ဆေး တက္ကသိုလ်
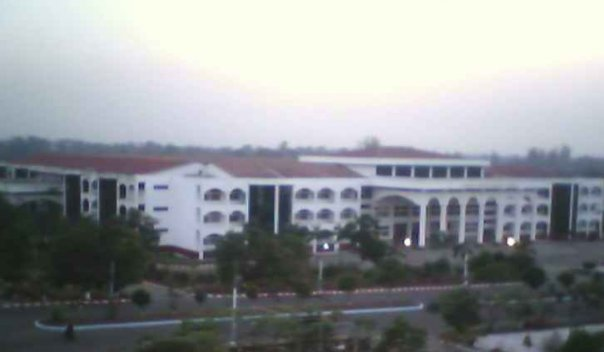
- Former name: Defence Services Institute of Medicine (DSIM)
- Motto: Victorious medical practitioner soldiers
- Type: Public
- Established: 19 November 1992
- Affiliations: Ministry of Defence, Ministry of Health and Sports
- Rector: Prof. Colonel Ko Ko Lwin
- Principal: Brig-Gen. Tun Ne Lin (2008)
- Postgraduates: 242 (2010)
- Location: Yangon, Yangon Division, Myanmar
- Campus: Mingaladon
- Nickname: DSMA

The Defence Services Medical Academy (DSMA; Burmese: တပ်မတော် ဆေး တက္ကသိုလ်), located in Mingaladon, Yangon, is the University of Medicine of the Myanmar Armed Forces. One of the most selective universities in the country, the academy offers M.B., B.S. (equivalent of the M.D.) degree programs. Upon graduation, most DSMA cadets are commissioned with the rank of Lieutenant in the Myanmar Army Medical Corps. The military physicians are to serve the healthcare needs of rural people when they are assigned in the country's remote regions where access to healthcare is poor.

=== History ===
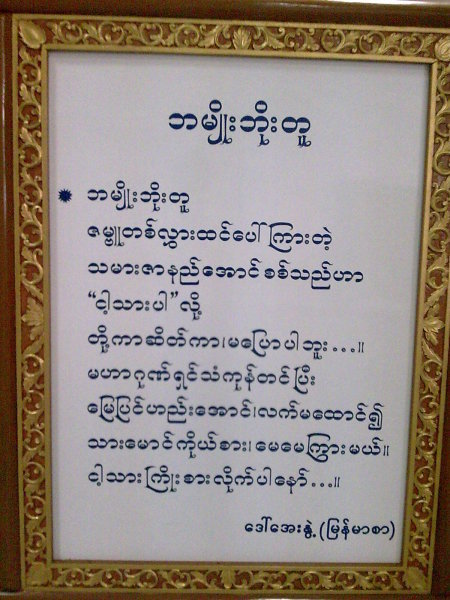
The inscription in stone

The DSMA was founded in 1992 as the Defence Services Institute of Medicine (DSIM) to develop physicians to serve in the Tatmadaw (Burmese Armed Forces). Prior to the founding of the academy, the Tatmadaw had recruited its medical and dental officers from civilian medical school graduates, who had to undergo a month-long basic military training program at the Medical Corps Center. While the medical corps of the Tatmadaw had always been short of physicians, by the early 1990s, the shortage became more pronounced as the military government, fearing student unrest, had shut down most civilian universities, following the 8888 Uprising in 1988. Most civilian universities were closed off and on for much of the 1990s. The military run universities essentially became the only venue for those who wished to continue university education inside the country.

The DSIM was operated by the Ministry of Health and the Ministry of Defence. The purported "aim of the DSMA is to produce good Medical officers endowed with brilliant physical and mental ability to safeguard The Three Main National Causes" espoused by the military government.

The first batch of 47 cadets from the DSIM were commissioned as lieutenants on 17 December 1999, after six years of study and a year as house-surgeons. Through nine intakes, the DSMA produced a total of 1525 medical officers. As of 2008, the DSMA had produced seven Doctor of Medical Science degree holders. The academy is only source of medical officers for the DMS. In terms of Master of Medical Science, by the early 2008, the DSMA had produced 335 specialists, including 48 physicians and 41 surgeons.

=== Admissions ===
The academy accepts approximately 400-500 students annually. Unlike at the country's other four civilian medical schools, the selection process goes beyond high university matriculation examination scores. All prospective candidates must be male, and must have high enough college matriculation exam scores to enter any civilian medical university. In addition, the prospective student must sit for another entrance exam as well as physical and psychological exams.

The selection criteria are:

- Males only
- DSMA entrance exams on: 1. biology, botany and zoology, and 2. English
- Physical fitness
- Teamwork and comradeship screening
- Psychometric assessment
- General interviews
- Medical checkups

The entrance selection including physical fitness tests, teamwork and comradeship screening, psychometric assessments and general interviews process takes about five to seven days at Officer Testing Team (OTT). Only those who pass all the tests and steps above are admitted to the DSMA. Students are eligible for various state scholarship programs.

=== Programs ===
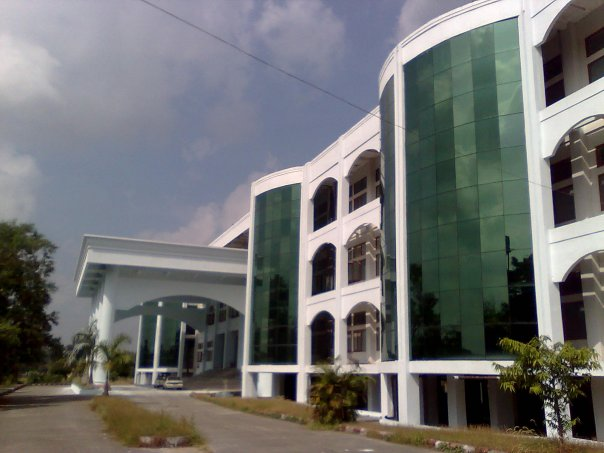
Main Academic Building

The DSMA offers courses for both basic and advanced degrees in medicine and surgery, and runs 20 graduate programs in medical sciences.

- Bachelor of Medicine and Surgery (M.B., B.S.)
- Diploma in Medical Science (Dip.Med.Sc.)
- Master of Medical Science (M.Med.Sc.); Physiology, Anatomy, Biochemistry, Microbiology, Pharmacology, Pathology, Public Health, Forensic Medicine, Internal Medicine, Surgery, Obstetrics and Gynaecology, Pediatrics, Orthopedics, Anaesthesiology, Radiology, Otorhinolaryngology, Ophthalmology, Mental Health, Medical regabilitastion.
- Doctor of Medical Science (Dr.Med.Sc.); Medicine, Surgery, Obstetrics and Gynaecology, Pediatrics, Orthopedics, Cardiac surgery, Cardiology, Neurology, Neurosurgery, Radiology, Anaesthesiology. Ophthalmology, Otorhinolaryngology, Urology, Renal Medicine, Forensic Medicine, Gastroenterology, Paediatric surgery
- Ph.D.

The DSMA is equipped with lab materials, modern textbooks, and training resources. As intern surgeons, the students must take a field practical tour of duty at military hospitals, where they get field training from professional surgeons. The academy is open year-round, and is in session for eleven months of study in an academic year—ten months of medical science coursework plus a month of military science and military leadership. Some DSMA graduates continue their post-graduate education in the UK.

=== Coursework ===
The M.B., B.S. coursework extends for seven years, and is the same as the major coursework of other civilian medical schools such as, the University of Medicine 1, Yangon, the University of Medicine 2, Yangon.

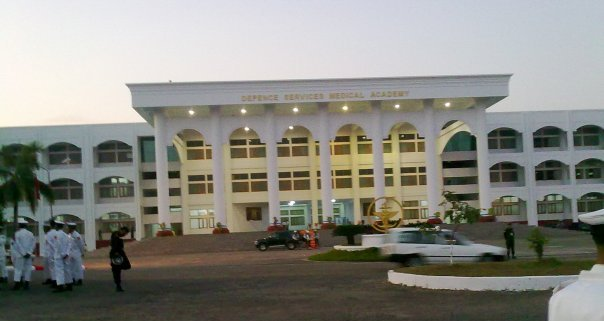

Year	Duration
First M.B., B.S.	1 year
Second M.B., B.S.	1 1/2 years
Third M.B., B.S.	1 year
Final M.B., B.S. Part I	1 year
Final M.B., B.S. Part II	1 1/2 years
House Surgeon	1 year
Total	7 years

=== Subjects ===
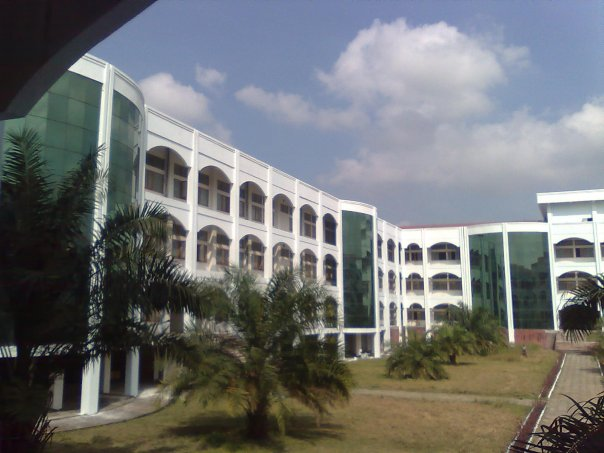

First M.B., B.S.

- Burmese
- English
- Mathematics and Statistics
- Physics
- Chemistry
- Biology (Botany and Zoology)
- Basic Computer Science
- Behavioral Sciences
- Introduction of Human Anatomy
- Introduction Physiology and
- Introduction of Biochemistry

Second M.B., B.S.

- Anatomy
- Physiology
- Biochemistry

Third M.B., B.S.

- General pathology
- Microbiology
- Pharmacology
- All cadets are also posted for 18 weeks each to the medical and surgical wards for clinical training at the school's teaching hospitals in Yangon.

Final M.B., B.S. Part I

- Forensic Medicine
- Preventive and Social Medicine (with three weeks of residential field training in the rural areas).
- Systemic Pathology and haematology
- Students attend lectures & clinics in Medicine, Surgery, Child health, Obstetrics & Gynaecology, and posted to the various teaching hospitals, including urban health facilities as part of Preventive and Social Medicine teaching.

Final M.B., B.S. Part II

- Surgery

Students study the allied specialities, namely, eye, ear, nose & throat diseases, urology, neurology, tuberculosis, venereal diseases, orthopaedics and traumatology, skin diseases, mental health and psychiatry, oro-maxillo-facial surgery, radiology, radiotherapy, nuclear medicine, anaesthesiology, thoracic surgery, and paediatric surgery.

- Medicine
- Obstetrics & Gynaecology
- Child Health
- A summative examination is held at the end of the Final M.B., B.S. Part II course. Problem Based Learning (PBL), Community Based Learning (CBL) and Behavioural Science are incorporated, as relevant, in the M.B., B.S. course.

House Surgeon Training All students, after a successful completion of Final Part 2 MBBS Examination, continue on to hands-on training for a period of one year as house surgeons in the recognized teaching hospitals in Yangon and/or the State and Division Hospitals. Training periods are as follows:

Subject	Duration
Child Health	
Community Medicine	
Medicine (including Psychiatry)	
Obstetrics & Gynaecology	
Surgery (including Traumatology)	

Only after the completion of house-surgeonship, is the student awarded the M.B., B.S. degree.

=== Teaching hospitals ===
- No (1) Defence Services General Hospital, Yangon (1000 bedded, Mingaladon)
- Defence Services Obstetric, Gynaecological and Children's Hospital, Yangon (300 bedded, Mingaladon)
- Defence Services Orthopaedic Hospital, Yangon (500 bedded, Mingaladon)
- Defence Services Liver Hospital (500 bedded, Mingaladon)
- No. 2 Military Hospital (500 bedded, Myoma Street, Dagon)
- Defence Services General Hospital, Naypyidaw (1000 bedded)
- Defence Services Obstetric, Gynaecological and Children's Hospital, Naypyidaw (300 bedded)
- Defence Services General Hospital, Pyinoolwin (700 bedded)
- Defence Services General Hospital, Meitila (500 bedded)
- Defence Services General Hospital, Aungban (500 bedded)

Every DSMA cadet also studies military science and military leadership for one to two months per year from First MBBS to Final M.B., B.S. Part I. After graduation, every medical officer has been trained as a platoon commander.

== University of Medicine, Taunggyi ==
University of Medicine, Taunggyi
- ဆေးတက္ကသိုလ် (တောင်ကြီး)
- Motto: ဥပဌာနံ အနုကမ္မာ ဒယာ (Pali: upaṭhānaṃ, anukammā, dayā)
- Motto in English: Service, Sympathy, Humanity
- Type: public
- Established: October 3, 2015
- Affiliations: Ministry of Health
- Rector: Win Htay Aung
- Location: Taunggyi, Shan State, Myanmar
- Language: English, Burmese
- Website: www.umtgi.com

The University of Medicine, Taunggyi (Burmese: ဆေးတက္ကသိုလ် (တောင်ကြီး), pronounced [sʰé tɛʔkəθò (tàʊɰ̃dʑí mjo̰];]) located in Taunggyi, Shan State is one of universities of medicine in Myanmar. The university offers an M.B., B.S. degree program. The university was established in 2015.

The university has planned to accept 200 students from Shan State and Kayah State and start its first enrollment in December 2015.

== See also ==
- University of Public Health, Yangon
- University of Community Health, Magway
- University of Medicine 1, Yangon
- University of Medicine 2, Yangon
- University of Medicine, Magway
- University of Medicine, Mandalay
- University of Medicine, Taunggyi
- University of Dental Medicine, Yangon
- University of Dental Medicine, Mandalay
- University of Nursing, Yangon
- University of Nursing, Mandalay
- University of Pharmacy, Yangon
- University of Pharmacy, Mandalay
- University of Medical Technology, Yangon
- University of Traditional Medicine, Mandalay
