= Insein General Hospital =

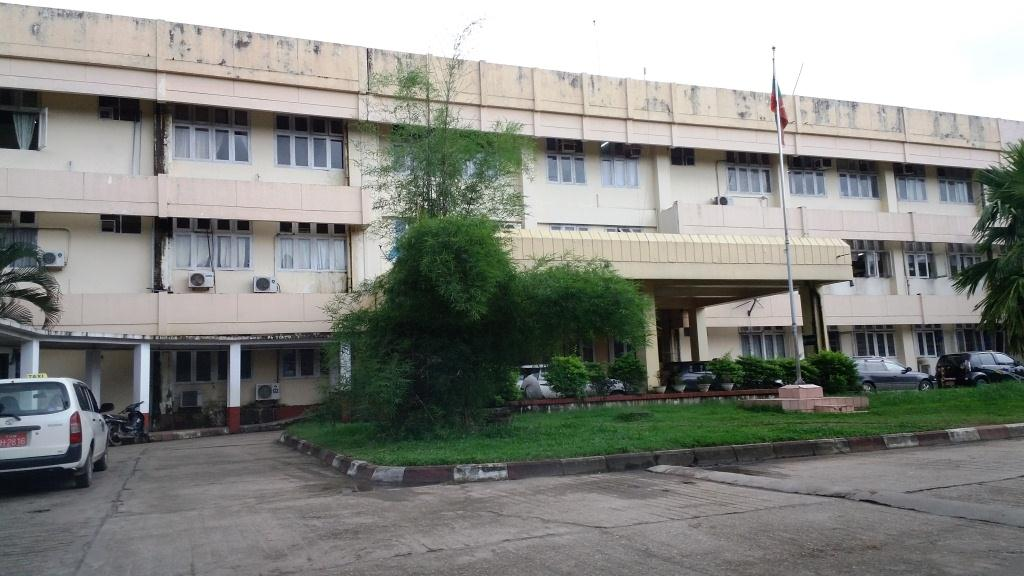
- Insein General Hospital

Geography
- Location: Mingyi Road, Taungthugone Quarter, Insein Township, Yangon, Yangon Region, Myanmar
- Coordinates: 16.891969°N 96.105388°E

Organisation
- Type: Teaching
- Affiliated university: University of Medicine 2, Yangon, University of Medical Technology, Yangon, University of Pharmacy, Yangon, University of Nursing, Yangon

Services
- Emergency department: Yes
- Beds: 500
- Speciality: Medical oncology, ophthalmology, ENT, dermatology

History
- Founded: 1930

Links
- Lists: Hospitals in Myanmar

The Insein General Hospital (Burmese: အင်းစိန်ဆေးရုံ) is a 500-bed public hospital and teaching hospital located in the northern part of Yangon, Myanmar. It has nine in-patient wards and six specialty clinics.

== History ==
In 1930, a well-known wealthy man in British rule, Sir Pho Thar, built and donated a 50-bed station hospital as an ancient colonial style building. Thus, it was known as Sir Pho Thar Hospital at that time. It was upgraded to 100-bed general hospital in 1952, 150-bed with specialty units for dentistry, orthopedics, laboratory and radiology in 1965 and 300-bed in 1991. With all these development, it became a central level government hospital in July 1995.

In 1996, a new 3-storey building and a guard ward for imprisoned patients with 20 beds were developed. Prisoners from Insein Prison are admitted in this guard ward as the prison is located nearby the hospital.

== Wards ==
- General Medical Ward
- General Surgical Ward
- Obstetrics & Gynecological Ward
- Pediatric Ward
- Trauma & Orthopedic Ward
- Ophthalmological Ward
- Otorhinolaryngological Ward
- Intensive Care Unit
- Sanga Ward for Buddhist Monks
- Guard Ward for Imprisoned Patients
- Oncology Ward

== Specialty clinics ==
- Elderly Clinic
- Dentistry Clinic
- Physical Medicine
- Psychiatric Clinic
- Tuberculosis Clinic
- ART Clinic
- Dermatology clinic
- Sexually Transmitted Disease Clinic
- Medical Oncology Clinic

== Diagnostic departments ==
- Radiology Department
- Pathology Department
- Microbiology Department

== Auxiliary departments ==
- Medical Record Department
- Medical Store Department
- Kitchen
- Laundry
- Motor Transport

== Teaching programs ==
The hospital became a teaching hospital of University of Medicine 2, Yangon in 1993. It is also affiliated with University of Medical Technology, Yangon, University of Pharmacy, Yangon and University of Nursing, Yangon.

=== Undergraduate ===
- MBBS degree
  - Third MB
  - Final part II
  - House surgeon
- Postgraduate
  - M Med Sc (Internal Medicine)
  - Dip Med Sc (Hospital Administration)
- Others
  - Nursing training
  - Pharmacist training
  - Paramedical sciences (Radiology, physiotherapy and lab technicians)

== See also ==
- List of hospitals in Yangon
