= Myanmar Motion Picture Organisation =

Official non-profit organisation for the Cinema of Burma

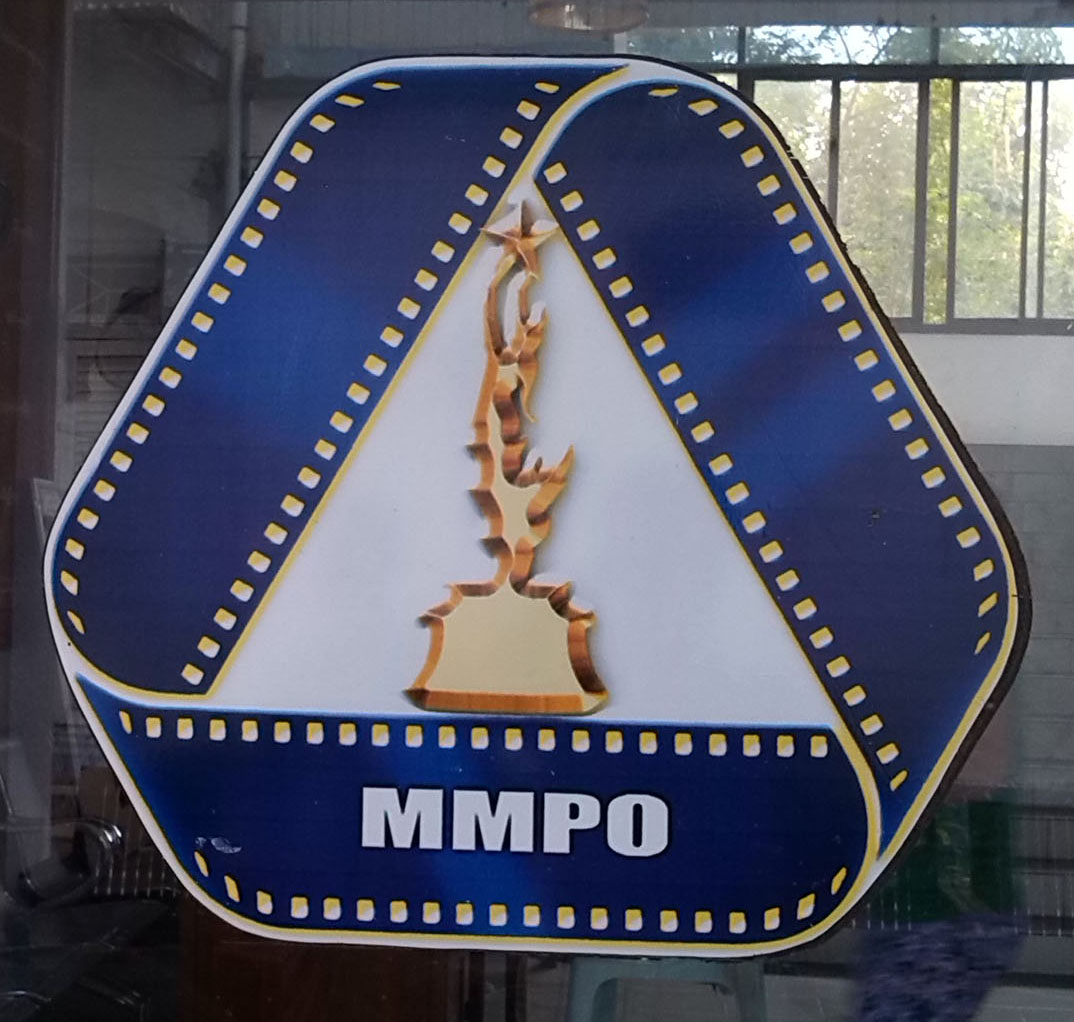
Logo of Myanmar Motion Picture Organisation

Myanmar Motion Picture Organization is the official non-profit organisation for the Cinema of Burma. It was established on 8 March 1946.

== Patron of Myanmar Motion Picture Organisation ==
- Bogalay Tint Aung, Musician and Opera Professional
- Maung Ko Ko, Musician
- U Tin Yu, Film Director
- U Myint Soe, Film Technician
- U Khin Zaw, Film Director
- U Nyunt Win, Film Actor
- U Sein Tin, Film Producer

== Chairmans of Myanmar Motion Picture Organisation ==
- U Tin Ngwe 1946 to 1958
- U Chan Tun 1951 to 1952
- U Shwe Done Bi Aung 1962 to 1963
- U Tin Maung 1964 to 1966
- U Nyi Pu 1969 to 70 and 1971 to 1972
- U Chinn Sein 1974 to 1986
- U Myint Soe 1986 to 1988
- U Khin Zaw 1989 to 1991
- U Nyunt Win 1992 to 1994
- U Sein Tin 1994 to 2005
- U Kyi Soe Tun 2005 to 2007
- U Myint Thein Pe 2007 to 2012
- U Zin Wine 2012 to 2014
- U Lu Min 2014 to 2017
- U Zin Wine 2017 to 2019
- U Nyi Nyi Tun Lwin 2019 to present
