= Hlaing =

Hlaing can refer to several features in Burma (Myanmar):

- Hlaing Township, Yangon Region
- Yangon River (Rangoon River)
- Hlaing, Kayin, a village in Kyain Seikgyi Township, Kayin State
- Hlaing, a village in Mon State 16°21′39″N 97°54′56″E
- Hlaing, a village in Mon State 16°22′54″N 97°54′03″E

...or to:

- Min Aung Hlaing, Myanmar military and political leader
