= UMMG =

UMMG or U.M.M.G. may refer to:

- University of Medicine, Magway
- University of Miami Medical Group
- Upper Manhattan Medical Group, a track in the album Jazz Party
- ICAO code for the Hrodna Airport
