= University of Medical Technology, Mandalay =

Higher education institute in Mandalay, Myanmar

- ဆေးဘက်‌ဆိုင်ရာ နည်းပညာ တက္ကသိုလ် (မန္တလေး)
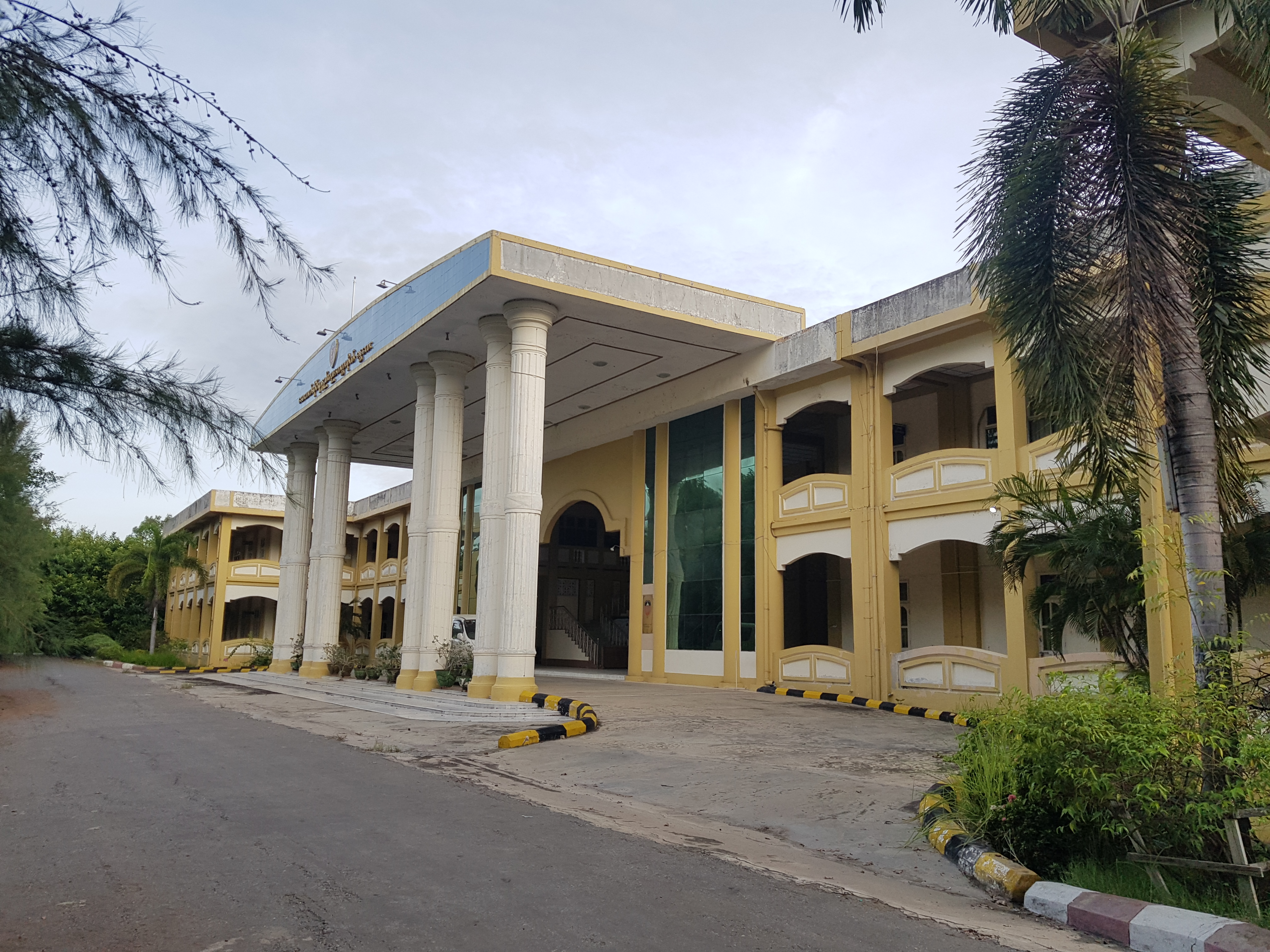
- Main Building
- Type: public
- Established: 1999; 27 years ago
- Affiliations: Ministry of Health
- Rector: Mya Mya Aye
- Students: 472 (2015)
- Undergraduates: 462 (2015)
- Postgraduates: 7 (2015)
- Location: Patheingyi, Mandalay; Mandalay Division, Myanmar; 21°59′27″N 96°08′54″E
- Website: http://www.umtmandalay.gov.mm/

The University of Medical Technology, Mandalay (Burmese: ဆေးဘက်‌ဆိုင်ရာ နည်းပညာ တက္ကသိုလ် (မန္တလေး), pronounced [sʰébɛʔ sʰàɪɰ̃jà nípjɪ̀ɰ̃ɲà tɛʔkəθò (máɰ̃dəlé)]; formerly, the Institute of Paramedical Science, Mandalay), located in Patheingyi, Mandalay, is one of three institutions of higher learning specialized in paramedical science in Myanmar.

The university offers four-year Bachelor of Medical Technology (B.Med.Tech) degree programs for Health Informatics, Physiotherapy, Medical Imaging Technology, qnd Medical Laboratory Technology. The university accepts 250 students a year.

== Programs ==
The university offers the following four four-year B.Med.Tech programs. Each program accepts 60 students a year. The language of instruction is English.

- Medical Laboratory Technology
- Physiotherapy
- Medical Imaging Technology
- Health Information

== Departments ==
The university consists of 12 academic departments.

=== Main departments ===
- Department of Health Information Technology
- Department of Medical Laboratory Technology
- Department of Physiotherapy
- Department of Medical Imaging Technology

=== Supporting departments ===
- Department of Biochemistry
- Department of Botany
- Department of Myanmar
- Department of Chemistry
- Department of English
- Department of Microbiology
- Department of Physics
- Department of Physiology
- Department of Zoology
- Department of Anatomy
- Department of Epidemiology
- Department of Biostatistics
- Department of Information Technology

== See also ==
- University of Medical Technology, Yangon
- Defence Services Institute of Nursing and Paramedical Science
