= University of Medicine, Taunggyi =

Medical University in Myanmar

- ဆေးတက္ကသိုလ် (တောင်ကြီး)
- Motto: ဥပဌာနံ အနုကမ္မာ ဒယာ (Pali: upaṭhānaṃ, anukammā, dayā)
- Motto in English: Service, Sympathy, Humanity
- Type: public
- Established: 3 October 2015; 10 years ago
- Affiliations: Ministry of Health and Sports
- Rector: Hla Win Myint
- Administrative staff: 269
- Students: 625
- Undergraduates: 625
- Location: Taunggyi, Shan State, Myanmar; 20.7545079665428°N 97.06212765305375°E
- Campus: 18.6 ha (46 acres)
- Nickname: UMTGI
- Website: umtgi.edu.mm

The University of Medicine, Taunggyi (Burmese: ဆေးတက္ကသိုလ် (တောင်ကြီး)) located in Taunggyi, Shan State is one of the five universities of medicine in Myanmar. Founded in 2015, the university offers an M.B., B.S. degree program.

The university started its first enrollment in December 2015 and accepted 200 students from Shan State and Kayah State.

== Campus ==
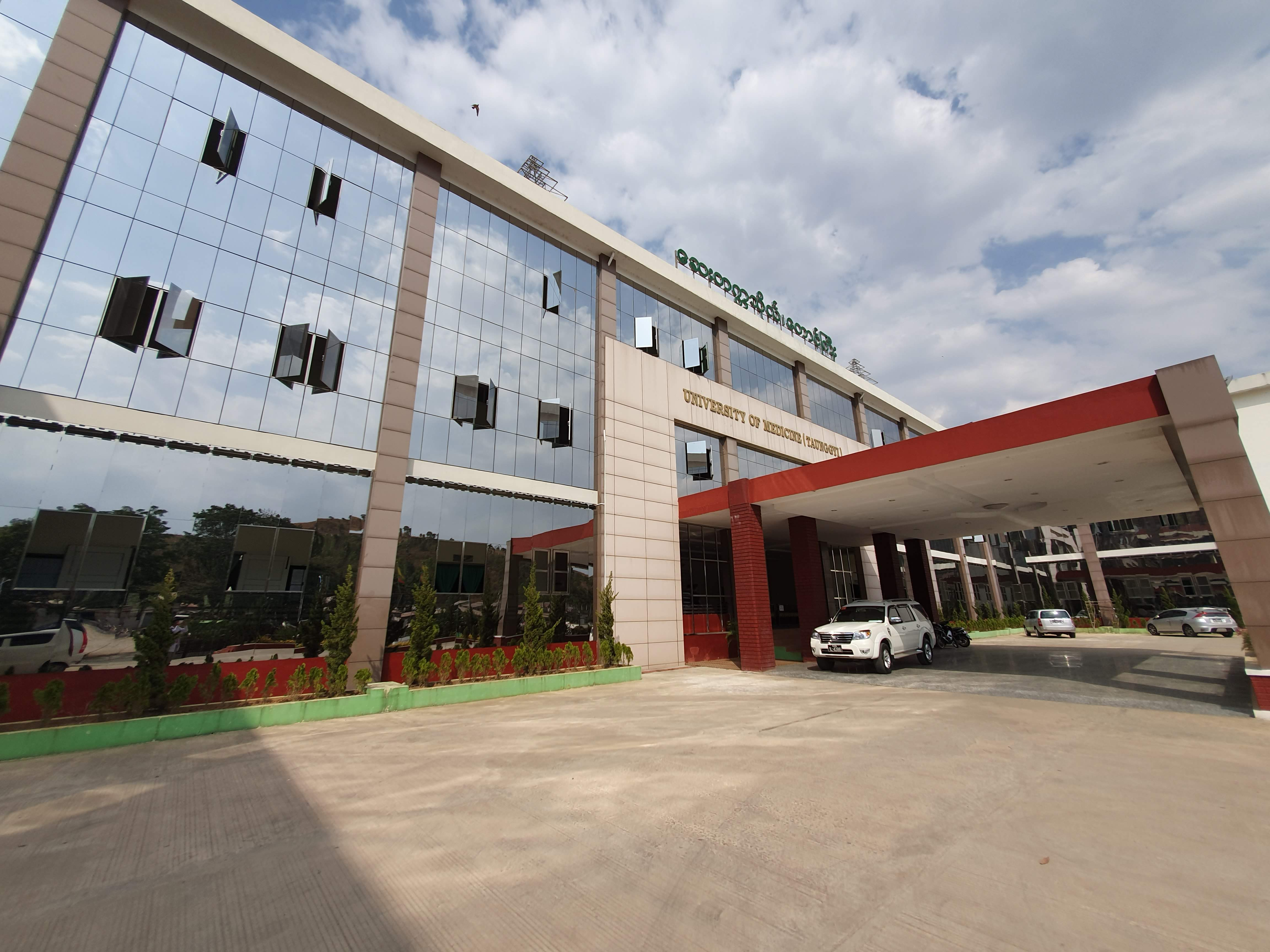
University of Medicine, Taunggyi

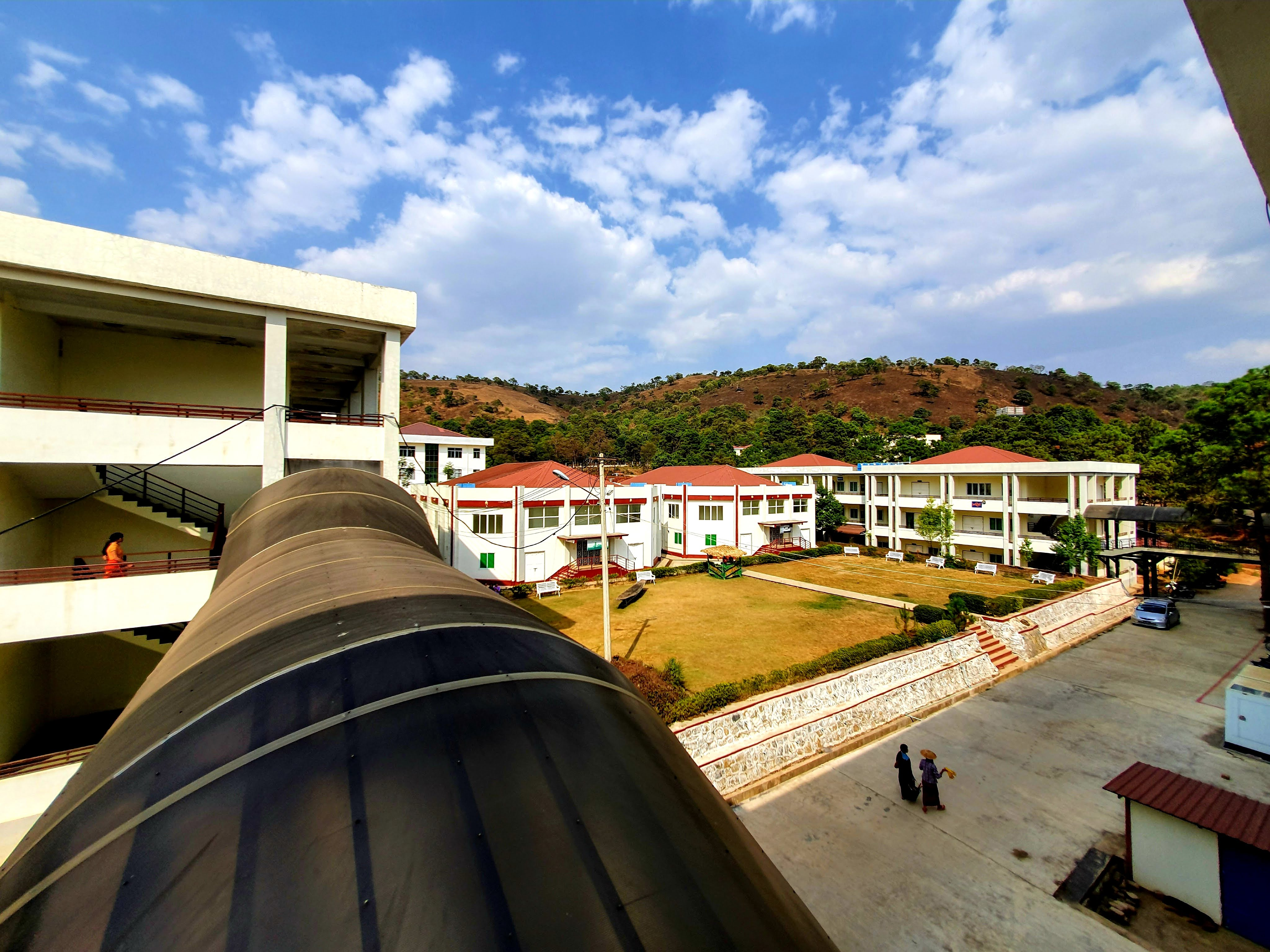
The view of the lawn

Located about 3.4 km (2.1 mi) southeast of Taunggyi, the university consists of 22 buildings across a 18.6 ha (46-acre) campus. The main building is home to the departments for first year M.B., B.S. subjects (Burmese, English, Mathematics and Statistics, Chemistry, Physics, Botany, and Zoology). The main building is also home to the Department of Administration, Department of Finance & Accounting, Department of Student Affairs, Department of Foreign Relations, Department of Examination, Department of the Library, Department of Sports, Department of Computer Science and Department of Campus.

== Undergraduate curriculum ==
The M.B., B.S. program lasts seven years.

Year	Duration
Foundation year	1 year
Medical year-1	1 year
Medical year-2	1 year
Medical year-3	1 year
Medical year-4	1 year
Medical year-5	1 year
House surgeon	1 year

=== Foundation Year ===
1. Burmese
2. English
3. Mathematics & statistics
4. Physics
5. Chemistry
6. Botany
7. Zoology

Hands-on practical exams are required in the latter four subjects.

=== Medical Year-1 ===
1. Anatomy
2. Physiology
3. Biochemistry

Hands-on practical exams are required in all subjects.

=== Medical Year-2 ===
1. General Pathology
2. Microbiology
3. Pharmacology

=== Medical Year-3 ===
1. Forensic Medicine
2. Preventive and Social Medicine (includes three weeks of residential field training in rural areas)
3. Systemic Pathology and haematology

=== Medical Year-4 ===
1. Child Health
2. Medicine
3. Obstetrics & Gynaecology
4. Surgery

=== Medical Year-5(Final year) ===
Student selected component (SSC)

=== House surgeon training ===
After passing the Final Year (Medical year-5) examination, students train for another year as house surgeons (residents) at one of the recognized teaching hospitals.

Subject	Duration
Child Health	2 ½ months
Community Medicine	2 weeks
Medicine (including Psychiatry)	3 months
Obstetrics & Gynaecology	3 months
Surgery (including Traumatology)	3 months

== Department heads ==
- Department of Myanmar Language - Nang Taung
- Department of English - Nang Kham Set
- Department of Mathematics - Mya Mya Min
- Department of Chemistry - Ohn Kyi
- Department of Physics - Mee Mee Cho
- Department of Botany - Than Than Aye
- Department of Zoology - Hla Hla Yee
- Department of Anatomy - Zaw Zaw Latt
- Department of Physiology - Thae Nu Htwe
- Department of Biochemistry - Sagawah phoo
- Department of Pathology - Cho Cho Myint
- Department of Microbiology - Tin Tin Myint
- Department of Pharmacology - Latt Latt Win
- Department of Preventive and Social Medicine Society - Cho Mar Kaung Myint
- Department of Forensic Medicine - Thaung Linn
- Department of Surgery - Tin Kyuu
- Department of Medicine - Aung Kyaw Thu

== Teaching hospitals ==
1. Sao San Tun General Hospital, Taunggyi
2. Women's and Children's Hospital, Taunggyi

== See also ==
- List of universities in Myanmar
- Medical Universities (Myanmar)
