= Thiri Mingalar Market =

Major public market in Yangon, Myanmar

Thiri Mingalar Market သီရိမင်္ဂလာဈေး
- Location: Hlaing Township, Yangon, Myanmar; 16.842477667847586°N 96.10941661376694°E
- Opening date: 24 December 2010; 15 years ago
- Developer: Burmese government
- Management: Yangon City Development Committee
- Number of tenants: 2,108
- Interactive map of Thiri Mingalar Market

Thiri Mingalar Market (Burmese: သီရိမင်္ဂလာဈေး) is a public market in Hlaing Township, Yangon, Myanmar. Established on 24 December 2010, it is one of the largest wet markets in Yangon and one of the country's largest wholesale markets. The market operates 24 hours a day.

== History ==
According to the Yangon City Development Committee (YCDC), the market was established in 2010, covers 16.921 acres, and contains 2,108 shop units. The market sources its fresh fruits and vegetables from the Ayeyarwady Region, Yangon Region, and western Bago Region.

During the COVID-19 pandemic, Thiri Mingalar Market reduced its operating hours after the Yangon Region government imposed a nightly curfew from 10:00 p.m. to 4:00 a.m., effective 18 April. Trading hours were limited to 4:00 a.m. to 7:00 p.m. Beginning on 20 April, after the Thingyan holidays, the market permitted the loading and unloading of goods until 10:00 p.m., although trading continued to end at 7:00 p.m. As the market mainly handles perishable produce, many fruits and vegetables could not be sold before they spoiled, resulting in losses for vendors.

An electric vehicle (EV) charging station opened within the Thiri Mingalar Market compound in March 2023 to serve public transportation and EV taxis.

== 2022 bomb explosion ==
On 26 December, a bomb exploded near the Global Treasure Bank (GTB) branch inside Thiri Mingalar Market in Hlaing Township, Yangon. Four people, including a driver and three labourers, were injured, and a parked vegetable transport truck was damaged. Following the explosion, security forces sealed the market and questioned vendors and market workers until the early hours of the following day. According to reports, while vendors were outside their shops during the questioning, cash, mobile phones, and merchandise were stolen from numerous stalls.
