= Hlaing Township =

Township of Yangon, Myanmar

Hlaing Township လှိုင် မြို့နယ်
- Township of Yangon
- Hlaing Township
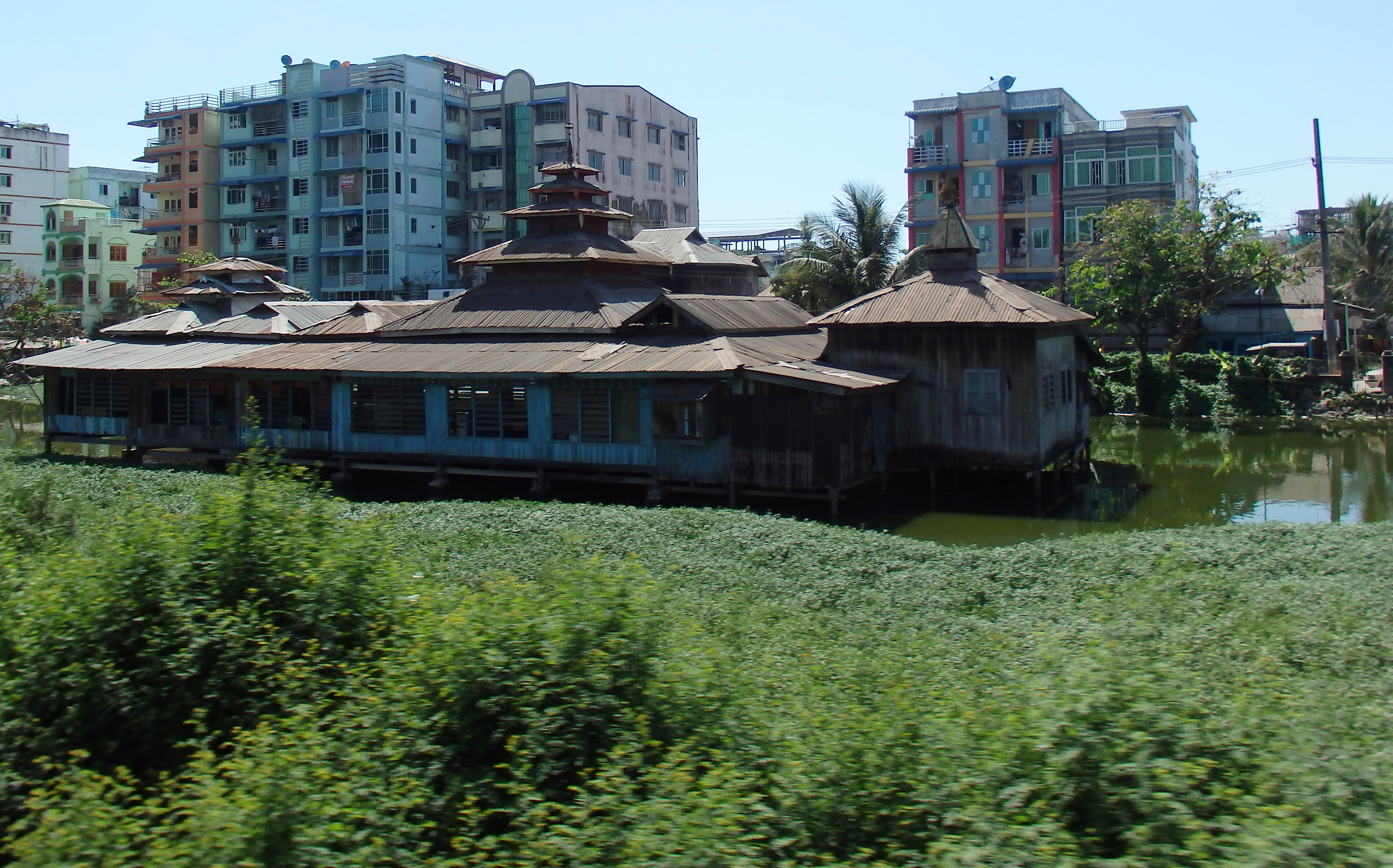
- A Nat shrine in a pond, Hlaing Township

- Location within Myanmar
- Coordinates: 16°51′30.0″N 96°8′0″E
- Country: Myanmar
- Region: Yangon Region
- City: Yangon
- District: Mayangon District

Area
  - Total: 5.29 sq mi (13.7 km^{2})
- Elevation: 36 ft (11 m)

Population (2000)
  - Total: 126,111
  - Density: 23,800/sq mi (9,200/km^{2})
  - Ethnicities: Bamar Indian Chinese Karen
- Time zone: UTC+6:30 (MMT)
- Postal codes: 11051, 11052
- Area codes: 1 (mobile: 80, 99)

Hlaing Township (Burmese: လှိုင် မြို့နယ်, pronounced [l̥àiɰ̃ mjo̰nɛ̀]), also spelt Hline, is an area of Yangon, Myanmar in the West Yangon District of Yangon Region. The township is entirely urban and comprises 16 wards. In 2000, the township's population was estimated to be about 125,000.

== Geography ==
Hlaing Township is an urbanized township on mostly flat terrain on the east bank of the Hlaing River. Hlaing Township is bordered by Mayangon township and Thamaing Creek in the north, Mayangon township and Inya Lake in the east, Kamayut Township and Tadaphyu Stream in the south, and the Hlaing River and Hlaingthaya Township in the west.

The climate of the township ranges between 40°C and 12°C, with an average of 118 days of rain in a year. A few plants grow within the town including jackfruit, tamarind, flame trees and banyan trees. Green spaces within the township include college campuses, sports fields, and the teak trees along Parami Road. The township faces air quality issues with a PM_{2.5} of 110 μg/m^{3} in the morning and 90 μg/m^{3} in the evenings.

== Demographics ==
Historical Population
| Year | Pop. | ±% |
|---|---|---|
| 1973 | | — |
| 1983 | | — |
| 2000 | 125,000 | — |
| 2014 | 160,307 | +28.2% |
| 2018 | 125,876 | −21.5% |
| 2019 | 126,111 | +0.2% |
Source: 2014 Myanmar Census and 2019 GAD Township Report

The 2014 Myanmar Census reported that Hlaing Township had a population of 160,307. However, the General Administration Department's 2019 township report reported only 126,111. It is unlikely to reflect a real loss in population, as the GAD also reports a consistently growing population.

74.7% of the township's reproductive age married women practice family planning with contraceptive injections and oral contraceptive pills being the most common methods.

The median age is between 25 and 30, and more females than males in the township. Only 50-60% of children in the township attend school, comparable to the national average. The Township is 91.4% Buddhist, with Hinduism making up the second largest group at 3.2%. A significant 4.41% of the township are Burmese Indians.

== Economy ==
Hlaing Township has become a part of the Yangon city economic core region over the 2010s and is primarily a service-sector economy. The average income in the 2017-2018 fiscal year was Ks.35,27,923/- (roughly US$2,380 by 2019 conversion rates).

Thiri Mingalar Market is a major wholesale market in the township.

Most prominent in sectors are computer services in MICT Park and the 18 car showrooms within the township (as of 2018). There are 6 YCDC managed markets within the township alongside 2 privately operated shopping centres. The most common store types are tea shops and clothing stores.

There is no agriculture and a limited industrial sector in the township. 6 of the 7 factories within the township are state-owned enterprises including aluminium and wood products. There are 27 car mechanic or battery workshops within the township.

The Yangon Circular Railway has 3 stops in the township: Okkyin, Thiri Myaing, and Kamayut, which is not in Kamayut Township despite its name.

== Education ==
The Township has 32 primary schools, eight middle schools, and four high schools.

The Yangon University of Education and the University of Information Technology both have a Hlaing Campus in the northeastern section of the township on the border with Mayangone Township.

== Landmarks ==
Yangon United Football Club and their base Yangon United Sports Complex are located in Hlaing near Insein Road. The Bayint Naung Golf Driving Range is located on the west side of the township near the No. 1 Army Barracks.

The following is a list of landmarks protected by the city in Hlaing township.

| Structure | Type | Address | Notes |
|---|---|---|---|
| Sri Mariamman Temple | Hindu Temple | 49 Yangon-Insein Road | |
