= Insein Township =

Township of Yangon, Myanmar

Insein Township အင်းစိန်မြို့နယ်
- Township of Yangon
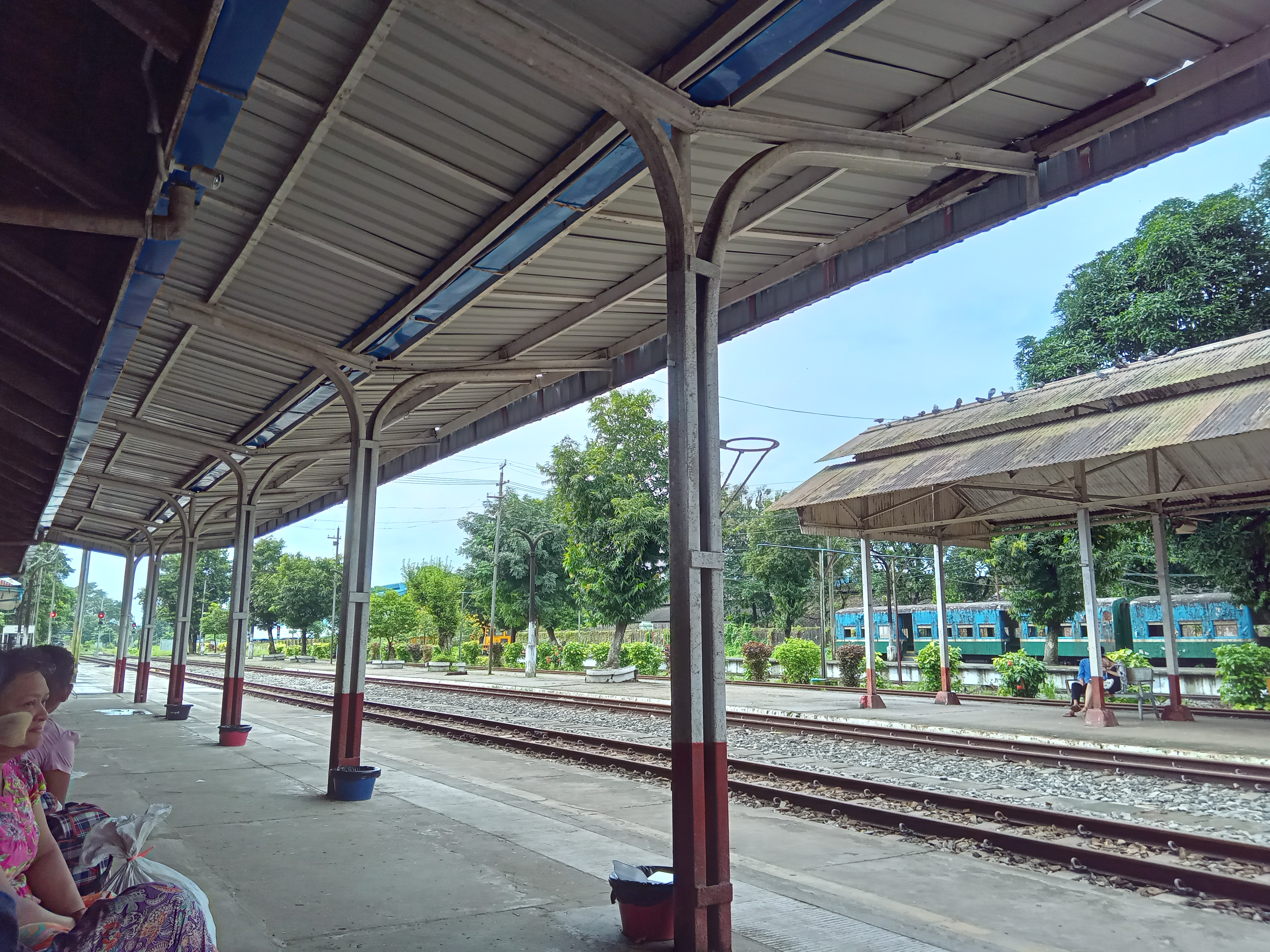
- Insein Station on the Yangon Circular Railway

- Insein Township in Insein District, Yangon
- Coordinates: 16°53′34″N 96°5′53″E
- Country: Myanmar
- Region: Yangon Region
- City: Yangon
- District: Insein District

Area
  - Total: 13.52 sq mi (35.0 km^{2})

Population (2023)
  - Total: 247,675
  - Density: 18,320/sq mi (7,073/km^{2})
  - Ethnic groups: Bamar: 84%; Kayin: 11%; Rakhine: 1.8%; Chin: 0.8%; Mon: 0.6%; Shan: 0.4%; Chinese: 0.3%; Indian: 0.3%; Kachin: 0.3%; Kayah: 0.2%
- Time zone: UTC6:30 (MMT)
- Postal codes: 11011, 11012, 11013
- Area codes: 1 (mobile: 80, 99)

Insein Township (Burmese: အင်းစိန်မြို့နယ်, pronounced [ɪ́ɰ̃sèiɰ̃ mjo̰nɛ̀]) is located in northern Yangon. The township comprises 21 wards, and shares borders with Shwepyitha township in the north, Hlaingthaya township in the west, Mingaladon township in the east and Mayangon township in the south. Insein is home to the Insein Prison, the most notorious prison in the country that houses hundreds of political prisoners.

== Etymology ==
The word "Insein" means "precious lake" in the Burmese language, and is also a former name of Inya lake. However, the etymology of "Insein" is derived from the Mon language term Mon: အၚ်စိၚ် (/ɛŋ coiŋ/), meaning "elephant lake."

== History ==
Insein was a famous battle site in the Burmese civil war that erupted after the country's independence from the United Kingdom in January 1948. Insein was the limit Karen insurgents reached in January 1949 in their ambitious attempt to take Yangon and oust the Burmese government.

Until the 1990s, Insein, about 20 miles (32 km) from central Yangon, was beyond Yangon's city limits, although by the 1980s, Insein was already integrated with the rest of the city. With the expansion of Yangon's city limits in the 1990s, which also included founding new satellite towns, Insein was formally incorporated into Yangon.

Insein is also home to Insein Prison, which is notorious worldwide for its inhumane conditions, corruption, abuse of inmates, and use of mental and physical torture, especially against political dissidents during the 1988-2011 State Law and Order Restoration Council era.

== Demographics ==
In 2019, the township had 285,500 people. In 2023, the township only had 247675 people. Between 2022 and 2023, the township lost 12,079.

== Education ==
Insein has 33 primary schools, ten middle schools and six high schools. Karen Baptist Theological Seminary, the Myanmar Institute of Theology, the University of Paramedical Science, Yangon, Yangon Technological University and are located in the township.

== Health ==
The Insein General Hospital is the principal hospital. Thiri Sandar Hospital Kwekabaw Hospital Kaung Hospital and KBC Hospital are private hospitals

== Sport ==
There is YCDC Golf Club Swimming Pool & Restaurant located at Thiri Mingalar street.

== Landmarks ==
The following is a list of landmarks protected by the city in Insein township.

Structure	Type	Address	Notes
Animal Husbandry and Veterinary Science Institute Headquarters	Office		
BEHS 1 Insein	School	Baho Road Part 4 (Mingyi Road)	
Criminal Investigation Department (CID)	Office	Lower Mingaladon Road	
Government Technical Institute, Insein	College	Lower Mingaladon Road	
Insein General Hospital	Hospital	Baho Road Part 4 (Mingyi Road)	
Myanmar Institute of Theology	College	Yangon-Insein Road	
Su Paung Yon Office Complex	Office	Baho Road Part 4 (Mingyi Road)	
Little yangon	Preschool	Nikbanda street	
