= University of Medicine, Magway =

- ဆေးတက္ကသိုလ် (မကွေး)
- Motto: ဥပဌာနံ အနုကမ္မာ ဒယာ (Pali: upaṭhānaṃ, anukammā, dayā)
- Motto in English: Service, Sympathy, Humanity
- Type: Public
- Established: December 17, 2000; 25 years ago
- Affiliations: Ministry of Health
- Rector: Aye Aye Oo
- Administrative staff: 426
- Students: 1,614 (2018)
- Location: Magway, Magway Region, Myanmar; 20.166050°N 94.996224°E
- Website: www.ummg.gov.mm

The University of Medicine, Magway (Burmese: ဆေးတက္ကသိုလ် (မကွေး), pronounced [sʰé tɛʔkəθò (məɡwé)]) located in Magway, is one of five universities of medicine in Myanmar. The university offers an M.B., B.S. degree program, and master's degree programs in medical science.

Up to 2011 December, the Ministry of Health-administered university was one of the most selective in the country, and accepts each year approximately 600 undergraduate students outside of Yangon Region and Mandalay Region based on their University Entrance Examination scores.

As it was the only university of medicine in the country that accepts students from the rest of the country, the university was reputed to have the most economically, culturally and ethnically diverse student population as the Union University, ပြည်ထောင်စု ဆေးတက္ကသိုလ်, among all Burmese universities of medicine. But, when educational reforms are started under the New Regime, the number of fresher candidates was reduced to 99 (2012 December) and those fresher students are from Magway Region, Shan State(East), Rakhine State, Bago Region (West). The fresher students from Lower Myanmar are relocated to University of Medicine 2, Yangon, and those from Kachin State, Chin State and Sagaing Region are sent to University of Medicine Mandalay.

University of Medicine, Magway, is one of five schools in Myanmar recognized by the Educational Commission for Foreign Medical Graduates.

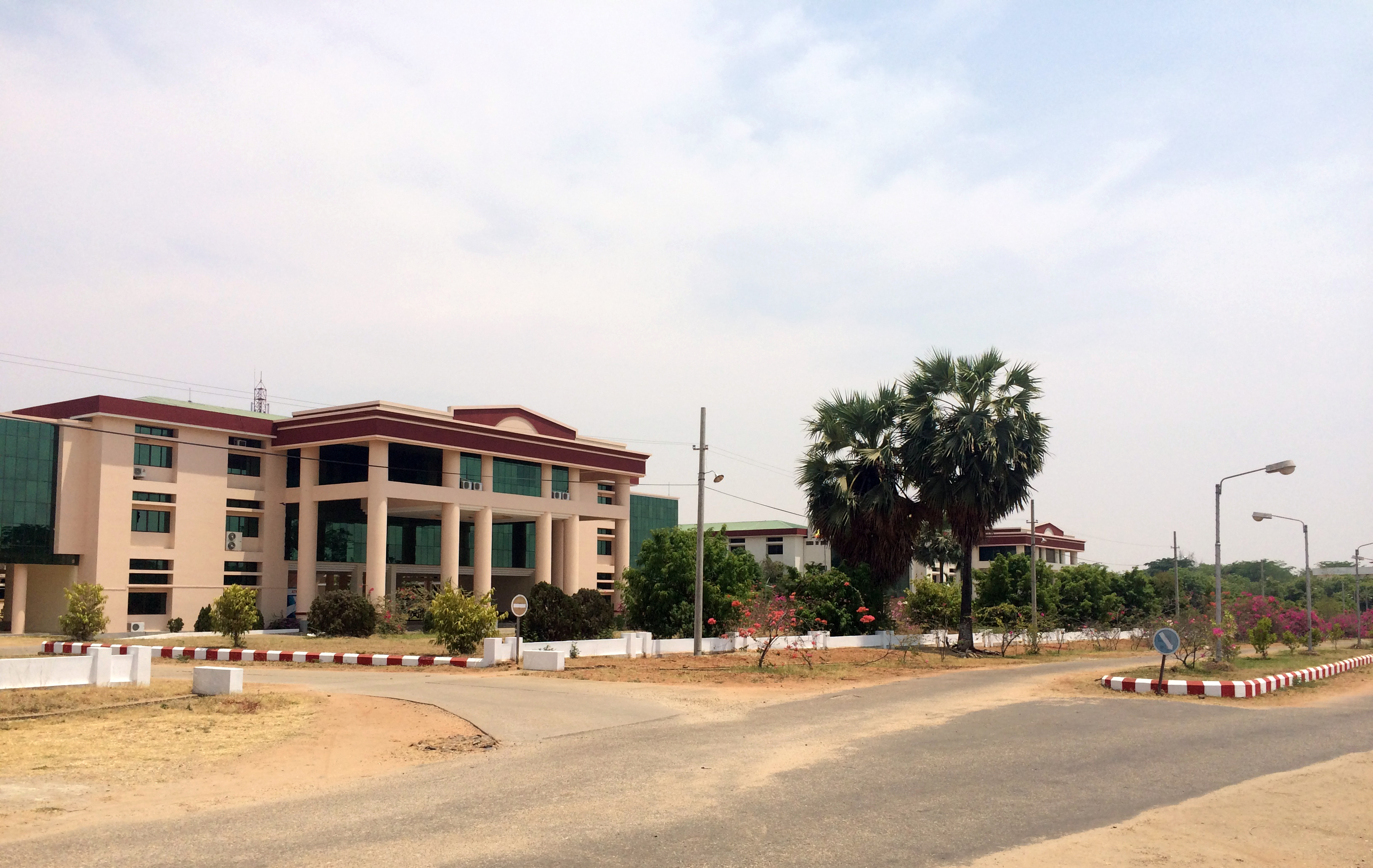
University of Medicine, Magway

== Leadership ==
The university has been headed by an academic dean known as a rector. Past rectors include:

1. Than Myint (April 2001–March 2006)
2. Maung Maung Win (April 2006–August 2010)
3. Win Myat Aye (February 2011–May 2014)
4. Aye Tun (June 2014–January 2017)
5. Khin Zaw (March 2017–July 2018)
6. Htay Hla (February 2019–July 2020)
7. Aye Aye Oo (April 2021–Present)

== Undergraduate curriculum ==
=== First Year M.B., B.S. ===
1. Myanmar Literature
2. English
3. Mathematics & statistics
4. Physics
5. Chemistry
6. Botany
7. Zoology

=== Second Year M.B., B.S. ===
1. Anatomy
2. Biochemistry
3. Physiology

=== Third Year M.B., B.S. ===
1. General Pathology
2. Microbiology
3. Pharmacology

Students are also posted for 18 weeks each to the medical and surgical wards for clinical training.

=== Final Part One M.B., B.S. ===
1. Systemic Pathology
2. Preventive and Social Medicine
3. Forensic Medicine

=== Final Part Two M.B., B.S. ===
1. Medicine
2. Surgery
3. Obstetrics and Gynaecology
4. Pediatrics

=== Internship ===
1. Medical Ward
2. Surgery Ward (Including Orthopedic and Operation Theater)
3. O and G Ward
4. Pediatric Ward
5. Field Research Department

All the government hospitals in Myanmar which have at least 4 specialties centers can be regarded as a field place for interns.

=== House officer training ===
All students, after a successful completion of Final Part II examination, are required to continue with hands-on training for a period of one year as house surgeons in state-recognized teaching hospitals in Yangon and/or the State and Division Hospitals. Training periods are:

Subject	Duration
Child Health	2 ½ months
Community Medicine	2 weeks
Medicine (including Psychiatry)	3 months
Obstetrics & Gynaecology	3 months
Surgery(including Traumatology)	3 months

House Officers must take their training in one of the teaching hospitals in the following cities:

1. Magway မကွေး
2. Minbu မင်းဘူး
3. Naypyitaw နေပြည်တော်

The House Officers can apply, if they wished, for the transfer to Yangon and Mandalay Hospitals after one ward completion in Training Hospitals under University of Medicine, Magway.

=== Core contents ===
- At the end of the 1st MB course, the student should be able to:
  - Define and understand ethics, medical ethics, Hippocratic Oath, Declaration of Geneva in Burmese and English versions
  - Be aware of ethical and moral issues in relation to Burmese culture
- At the end of the 2nd MB course, the student should be able to:
  - Choose correct statement regarding respect of dead body and specimen.
  - Choose correct statement regarding research ethics
  - Choose correct statement regarding informed consent
- At the end of the 3rd MB course, the student should be able to:
  - Be aware of biomedical ethics
  - Safely handle infectious agents
  - Describe rational prescribing (NNT, RRR, APR)
  - Prescribe safely
  - Conduct appropriate bedside manner
  - Identify health care errors and their causes
- At the end of the FP I course, the student should be able to describe:
  - Code of conduct (medical/ethical)
  - Serious medical misconduct
  - Medical negligence (civil and criminal)
  - Formation and function of MMC
  - Professionalism
  - Patient safety concepts
  - How to take consent for post-mortem examination
  - Public health ethics and their importance
  - Communication skills concerning specimen collection
  - Ethical principle of respect for the death
- After the end of the Final Part II, the students should be able to:
  - Demonstrate effective and ethical communications skills in patient management
  - Be aware of patient safety concepts & ethical principles in clinical management decision making and ethical dilemmas
- After the end of the internship, the candidates should be able to:
  - Apply patient safety concepts and ethical principles in clinical management decision making and ethical dilemmas

== Graduate curriculum ==
The university offers master's degree programs in Anatomy, Physiology, Biochemistry, Microbiology, Pharmacology, Pathology, Medicine, Surgery, Obstetrics and Gynaecology, and Pediatrics.

== Teaching hospitals ==
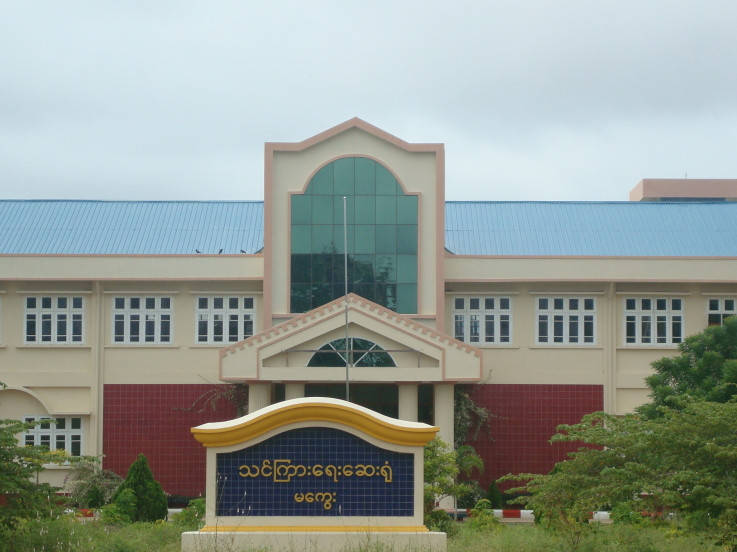
Teaching Hospital of the university

1. Magway Regional Hospital
2. Minbu District Hospital
3. Magway Teaching Hospital

== See also ==
- List of universities in Myanmar
- Medical Universities (Myanmar)
