= Patheingyi Township =

Patheingyi Township ပုသိမ်ကြီးမြို့နယ်
- Township
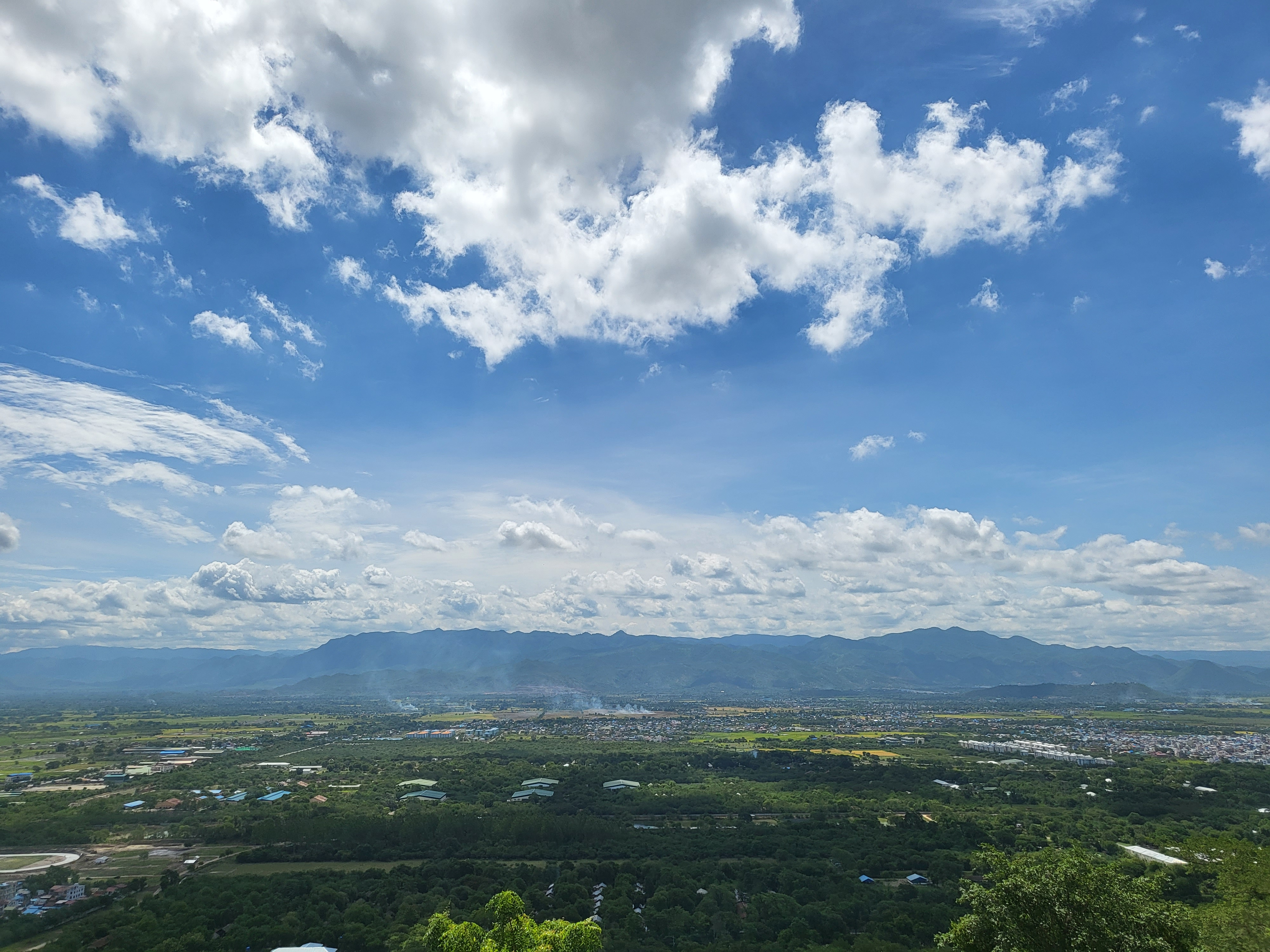

- Location in Aungmyethazan district

- Location within Myanmar
- Coordinates: 22°00′47″N 96°09′31″E
- Country: Myanmar
- Region: Mandalay
- City: Mandalay
- District: Aungmyethazan

Population (2014)
  - Total: 263,725
- Time zone: UTC6:30 (MST)
- Area codes: 2 (mobile: 69, 90)

Patheingyi Township (Burmese: ပုသိမ်ကြီးမြို့နယ်, pronounced [pəθèɪɰ̃dʑí mjo̰nɛ̀]) is located in the eastern part of Mandalay, Myanmar. The township is bounded by Aungmyethazan Township and Chanayethazan Township in the west. Incorporated into the Mandalay city's limits, Patheingyi represents the eastward march of Mandalay's urban sprawl. Patheingyi is still largely made up of rice paddy fields but in the past two decades has become home to a number of universities.

== Notable places ==
- Mandalay Tuberculosis Hospital
- Mandalay Technological University
- University of Computer Studies, Mandalay
- University of Culture, Mandalay
- University of Medical Technology, Mandalay
- University of Paramedical Science, Mandalay
- Upper Myanmar TB Center
