= Khin Zaw =

- ခင်ဇော်

Director general of Food and Drug Administration (Myanmar)
- Incumbent
- Assumed office 2018

Rector of the University of Medicine, Magway
- In office March, 2017 – July, 2018
- Preceded by: Aye Tun
- Succeeded by: Hla Win Myint

Personal details
- Born: Rangoon, Burma
- Education: University of Medicine 2, Yangon (M.B., B.S)
- Occupation: Professor, Director General (FDA)

Khin Zaw (Burmese: ခင်ဇော်) is a Burmese surgeon and professor. He serves as a director general of Food and Drug Administration (Myanmar). He previously served as Rector of the University of Medicine, Magway from March 2017 to July 2018 and as a pro-rector of University of Medicine 2, Yangon.

== Early life and education ==
Khin Zaw was born in Yangon, Myanmar. He graduated from University of Medicine 2, Yangon and received M.B., B.S degree.
