= Defence Services Institute of Nursing and Paramedical Science =

Higher education institute in Yangon, Myanmar

Coordinates: 16°55′10.8″N 96°08′04.8″E

Defence Services Nursing and Paramedical Academy ( DSNPA )
- တပ်မတော် သူနာပြု နှင့် ဆေးဘက် ပညာ တက္ကသိုလ်
- Motto: Valour, knowledge, skill
- Type: public
- Established: 2000; 26 years ago
- Location: Mingaladon 11201, Yangon; Yangon Division, Myanmar

The Defence Services Nursing and Paramedical Academy (MINP) (Burmese: တပ်မတော် သူနာပြု နှင့် ဆေးဘက် ပညာသည် တက္ကသိုလ်, pronounced [taʔmədɔ̀ θùnàpjṵ n̥ɪ̰ɰ̃ sʰébɛʔ pjɪ̀ɰ̃ɲàðɛ̀ tɛʔkəθò]), located in Mingaladon, Yangon, is a military-run institution of higher learning in Myanmar. The university offers bachelor's, master's and PhD degree programs in Nursing, and bachelor's degree programs in Pharmacy, and Paramedical Science.

== History ==
DSIN was founded in 2000 by the Burmese military as the Defence Services Institute of Nursing with assistance from the Yangon Institute of Nursing and the Mandalay Institute of Nursing. In 2002, the institute added paramedical science and pharmacy degree programs, and became the Defence Services Nursing and Paramedical Academy. In 2003, the institute assumed its present name.
