= Myint Soe =

- မြင့်စိုး
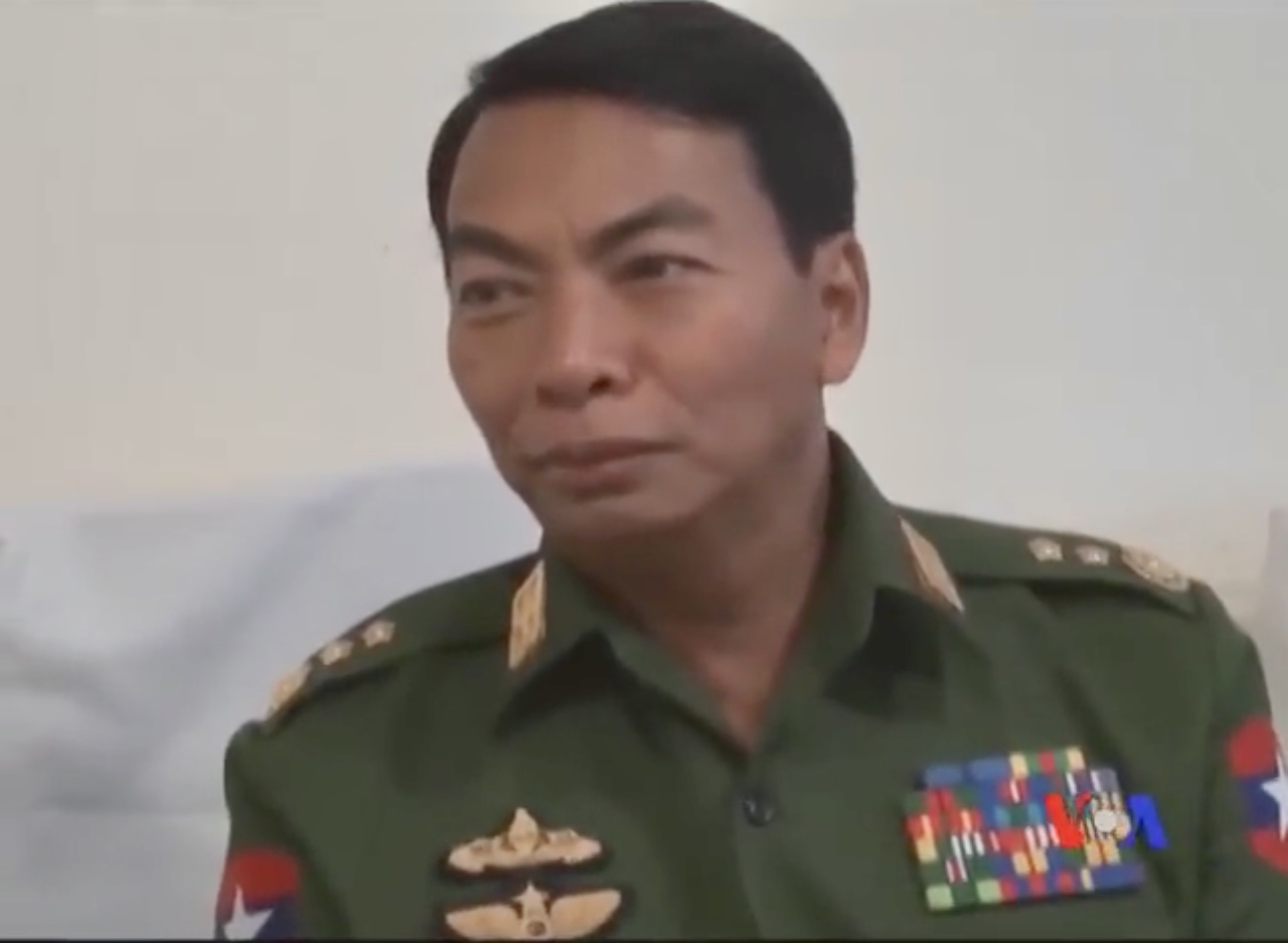
- Myint Soe in an interview with VOA Burmese in 2013
- Military career
- Allegiance: Myanmar
- Rank: Lieutenant General
- Commands: Northwest Regional Command

Lieutenant General Myint Soe (Burmese: မြင့်စိုး) is a retired Burmese military officer and politician who served as the commander of the 1 Bureau of Special Operations from 28 May 2013 to 11 August 2015, and Northwest Regional Command. He has played a leading role in difficult and at times fractious negotiations between the government and the Kachin Independence Organisation in 2013. He was the representative of the Ministry of Defense at the Myitkyina peace talks. Aung Min, a minister and one of the peace talks' leaders, told the media that in this meeting, Myint Soe handed over all the power regarding military affairs by the Commander-in-Chief of Defence Services.

Myint Soe graduated from the 61st intake of the Officers Training School, Bahtoo. In 2006, he served as the operation commander of the 5 Military Operations Command with the rank of brigadier general.
