= University of Medical Technology, Yangon =

Higher education institute in Yangon, Myanmar

Coordinates: 16°54′56.7″N 96°06′01.4″E

- ဆေးဘက်‌ဆိုင်ရာ နည်းပညာ တက္ကသိုလ် (ရန်ကုန်)
- Type: Public
- Established: 1993; 33 years ago
- Affiliations: Ministry of Health
- Rector: Khin Saw Oo
- Location: Insein Township, Yangon; Yangon Division, Myanmar
- Website: http://www.umty.gov.mm

The University of Medical Technology, Yangon (Burmese: ဆေးဘက်‌ဆိုင်ရာ နည်းပညာ တက္ကသိုလ် (ရန်ကုန်) [sʰébɛʔ sʰàɪɰ̃jà nípjɪ̀ɰ̃ɲà tɛʔkəθò (jàɰ̃ɡòʊɰ̃)]; formerly, the Institute of Paramedical Science, Yangon) is one of two universities of medical technology in Myanmar. The university offers four-year Bachelor of Medical Technology (B.Med.Tech) and two-year Master of Medical Technology (M.Med.Tech) degree programs in physiotherapy, medical laboratory technology and medical imaging technology. The university accepts approximately 150 undergraduate students annually. It is situated at Lower Mingaladon Road in Insein Township.

== History ==
Formal paramedical education in Myanmar began in 1964 when a paramedical diploma course in accordance with the guidelines set by the College of Radiographers, UK, was introduced. This was part of an international technical assistance program—the Colombo Plan, and was available until 1986. The Institute of Paramedical Science, Yangon was formally established in 1993. It was the only institute in the country until the founding of the Institute of Medical Technology, Mandalay in 2002.

== Programs ==
The university offers two-year diploma and four-year bachelor's degree programs in radiography, physiotherapy, and medical technology.

Program	Diploma	Bachelor's
Radiography	DPSc	BPSc
Medical Imaging Technology	DMedTech	BMedTech
Medical Laboratory Technology	DMedTech	BMedTech
Physiotherapy	DMedTech	BMedTech

== See also ==
- University of Medical Technology, Mandalay
- Defence Services Institute of Nursing and Paramedical Science
