= Insein Road =

Road in Yangon, Myanmar

Coordinates: 16°50′54.6″N 96°07′30.3″E

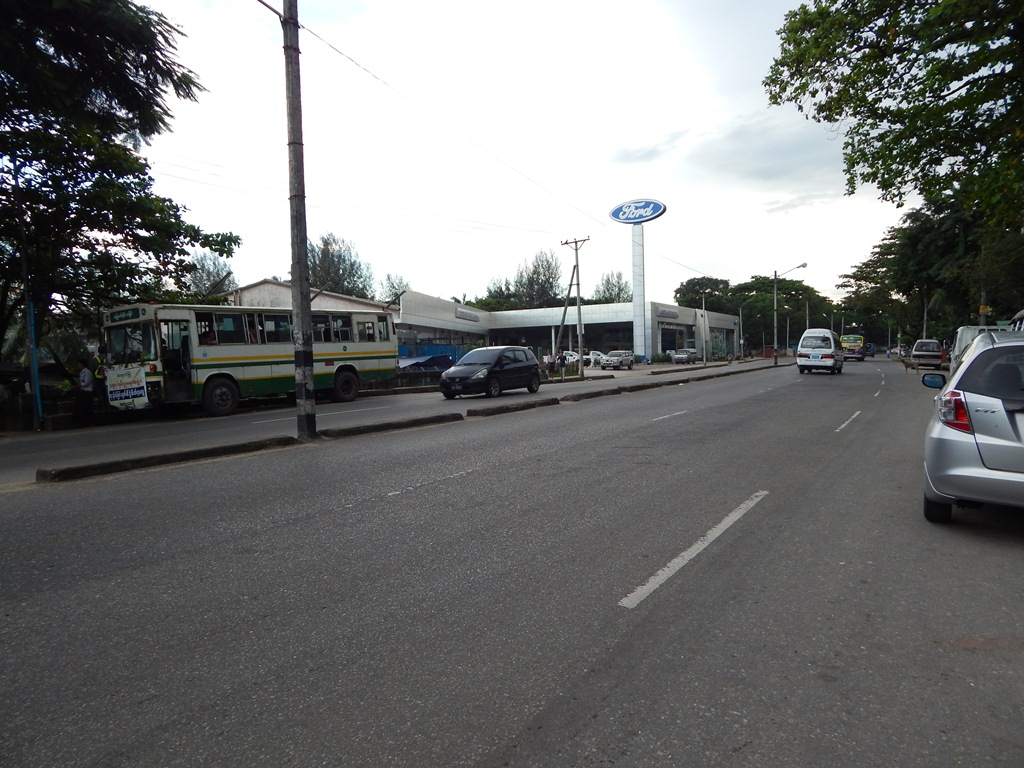
Insein Road

Insein Road (Burmese: အင်းစိန်လမ်း) is a major thoroughfare of Yangon, Burma. It connects the centre to the northern part of the city and passes through Insein Township. Many universities are located along this road.
