= University of Nursing, Mandalay =

Nursing school in Mandalay, Myanmar

- သူနာပြု တက္ကသိုလ် (မန္တလေး)
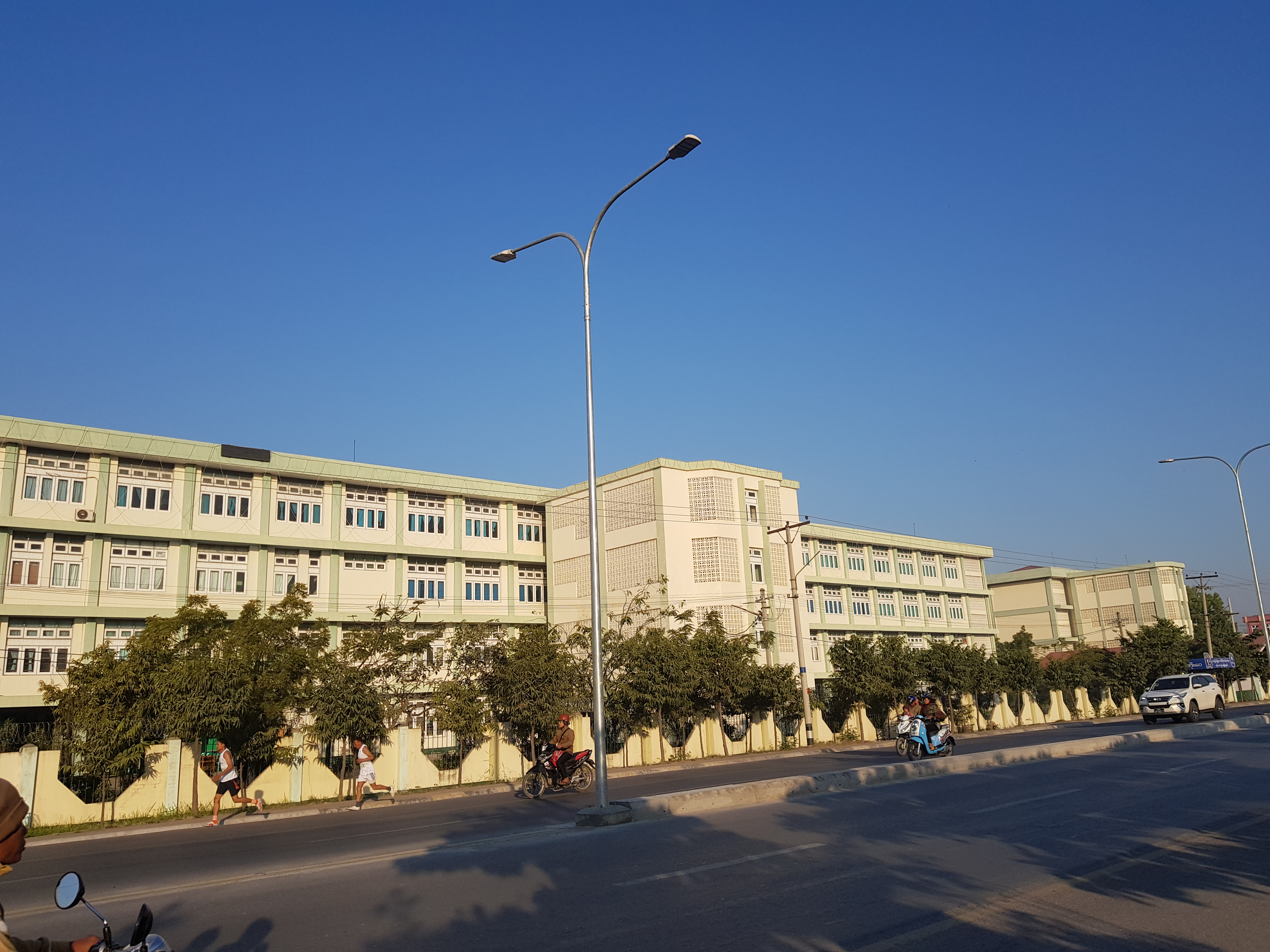
- Main Building in 2019
- Type: public
- Established: 1998; 28 years ago
- Affiliations: Ministry of Health
- Rector: Khin Win Sein
- Administrative staff: 220
- Students: 100 per intake
- Location: 62nd, 105×106 Streets, Chanmyathazi, Mandalay, Myanmar; 21°56′0″N 96°5′0″E
- Website: www.uonmdy.gov.mm

The University of Nursing, Mandalay (also the Institute of Nursing, Mandalay; Burmese: သူနာပြု တက္ကသိုလ် (မန္တလေး), pronounced [θùnàpjṵ tɛʔkəθò (máɰ̃dəlé)]) is a university of nursing, located in Mandalay, Myanmar. It is one of three universities in the nation that offers a four-year bachelor's degree program in nursing. The university also offers a master's degree program in nursing.

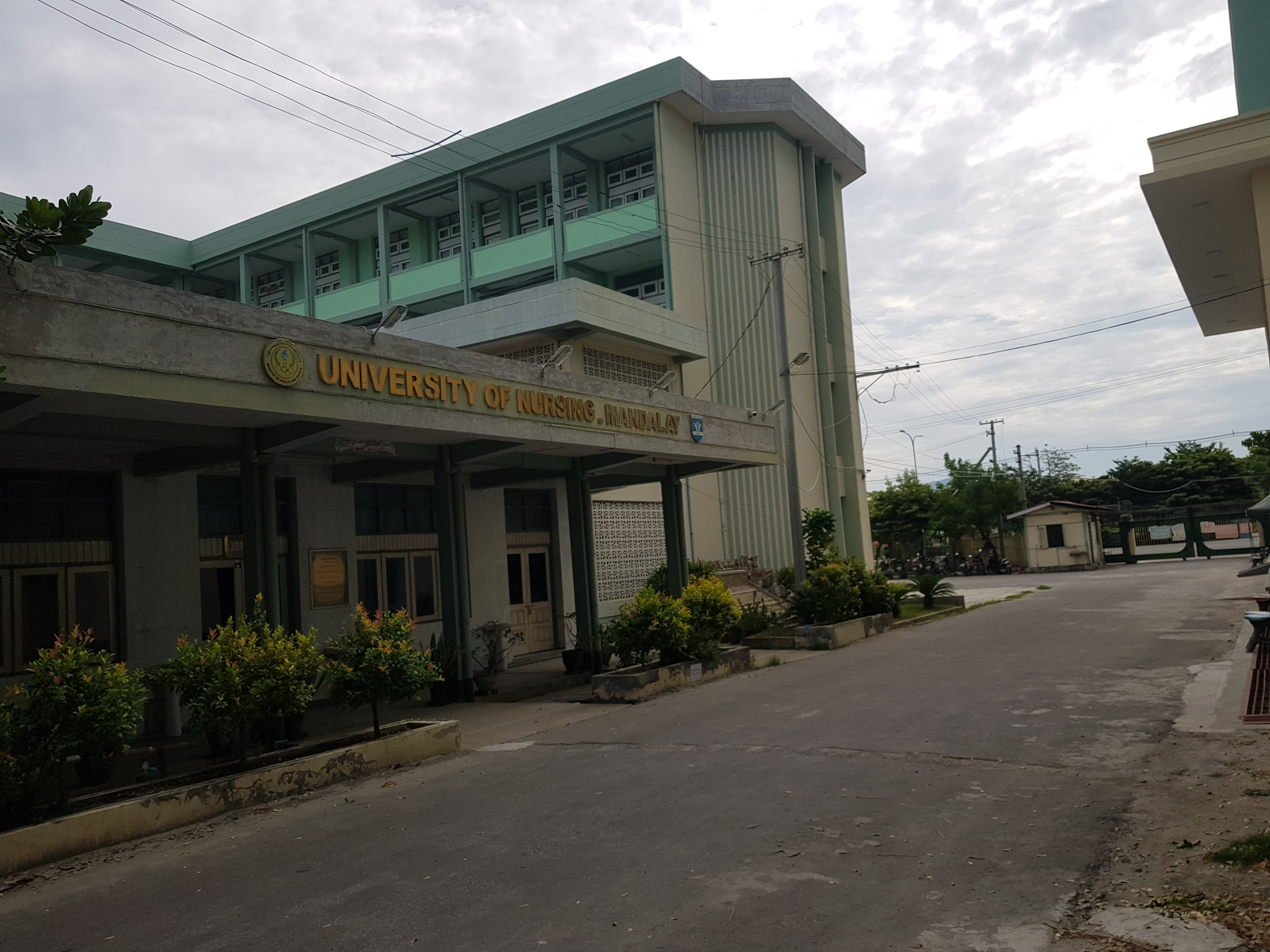
Main Building in 2021

The university, which admits only 100 students per year, is one of the more selective universities in the nation. Nursing is one of few professions in Myanmar that provides decent job opportunities—inside or outside the country. The University Entrance Examination matriculation marks required for admission in 2006 was 380 out of 600, slightly below what was required to go to medical school.

Speciality diploma programs in dental, EENT, mental health, pediatrics, critical care, and orthopedics are offered only at the Yangon Institute of Nursing.

== Gallery ==
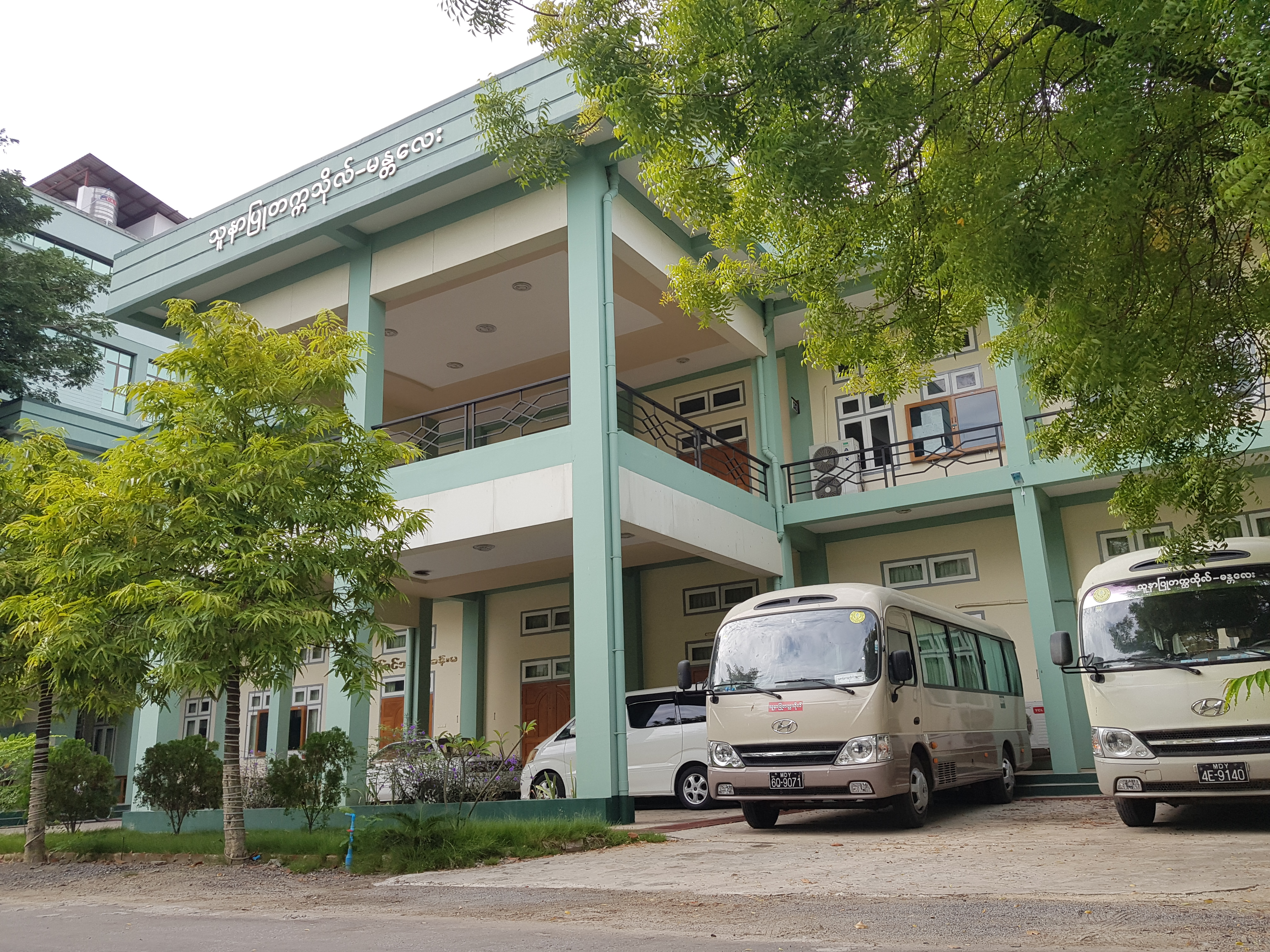

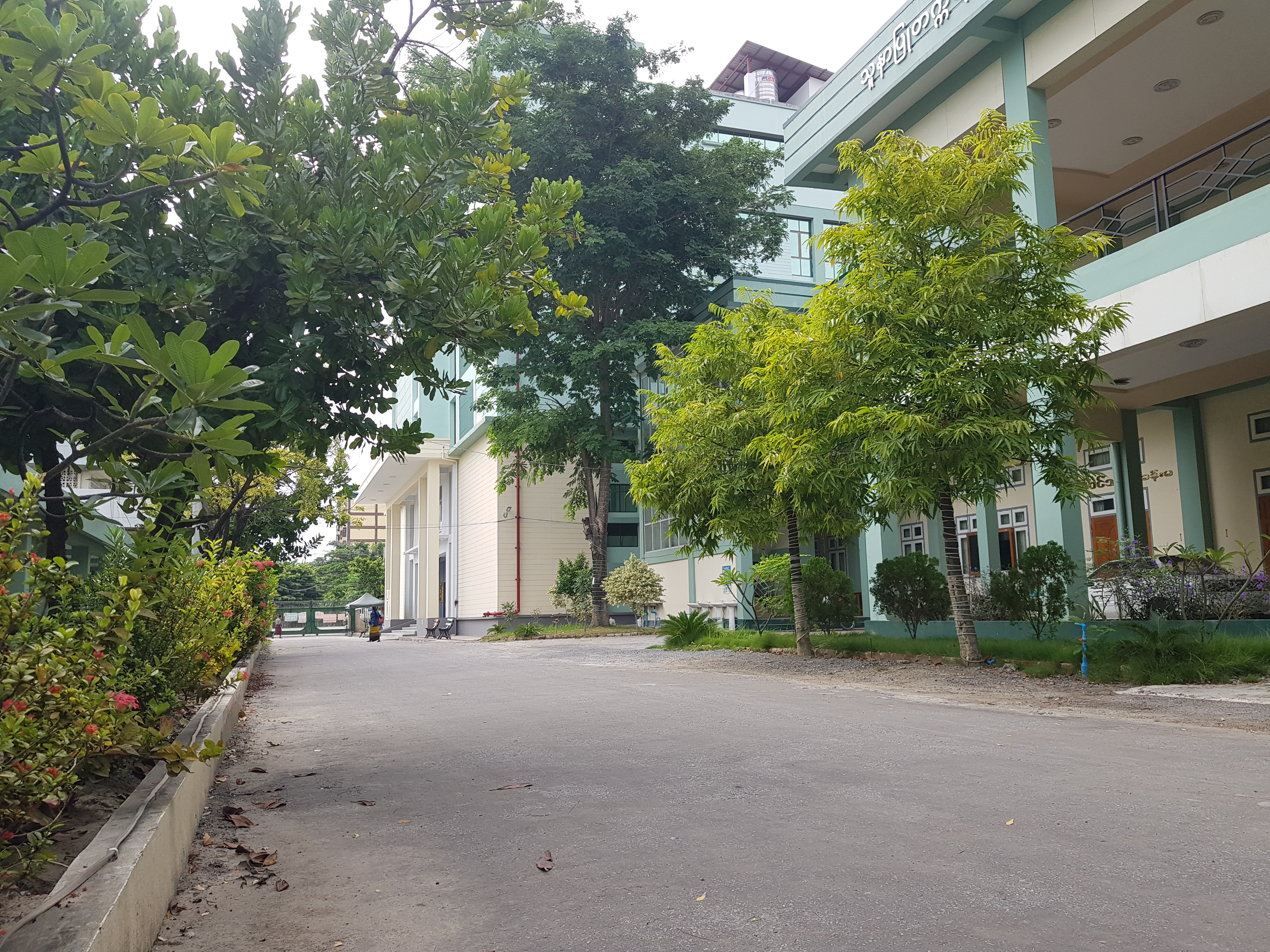

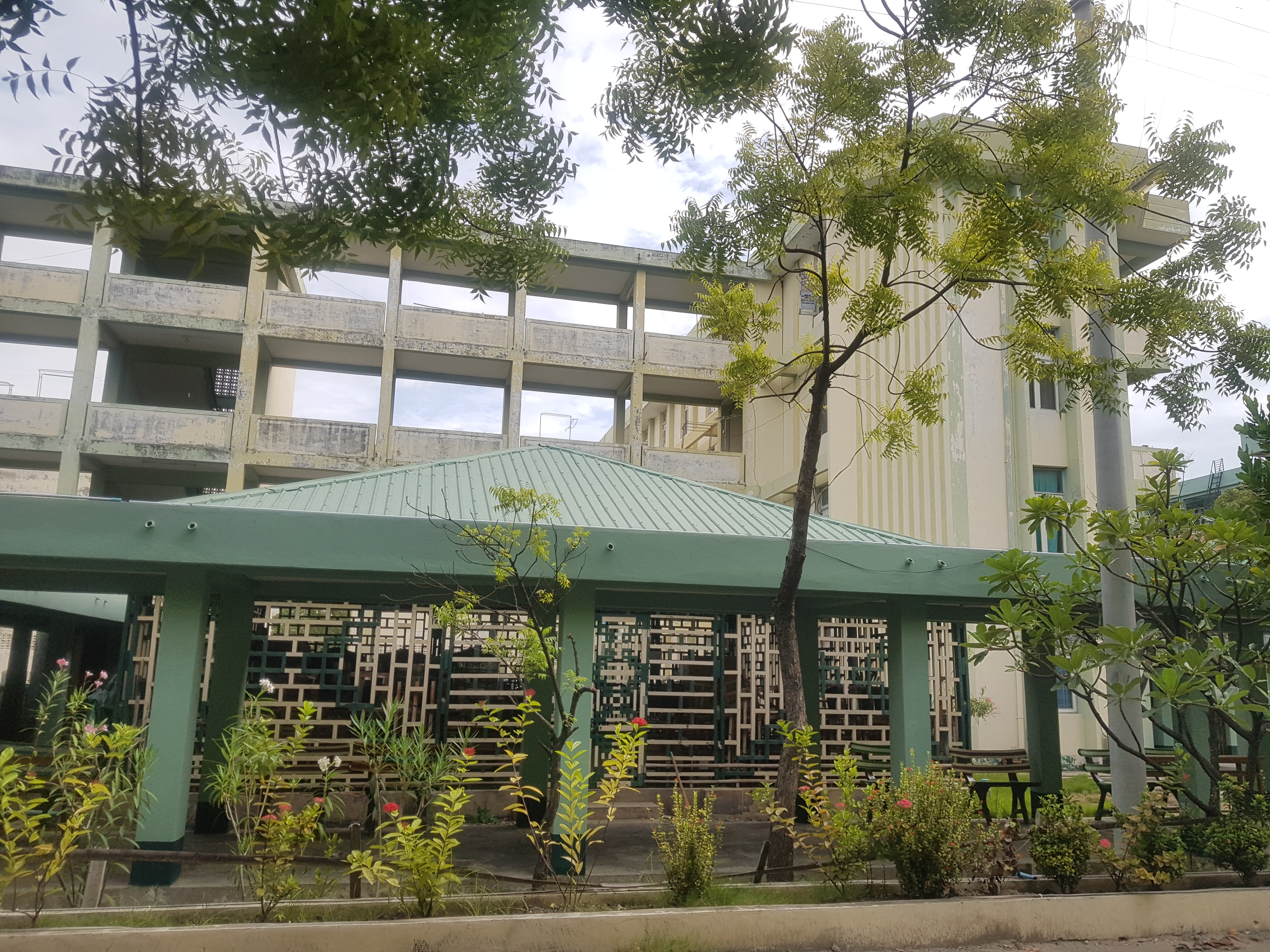

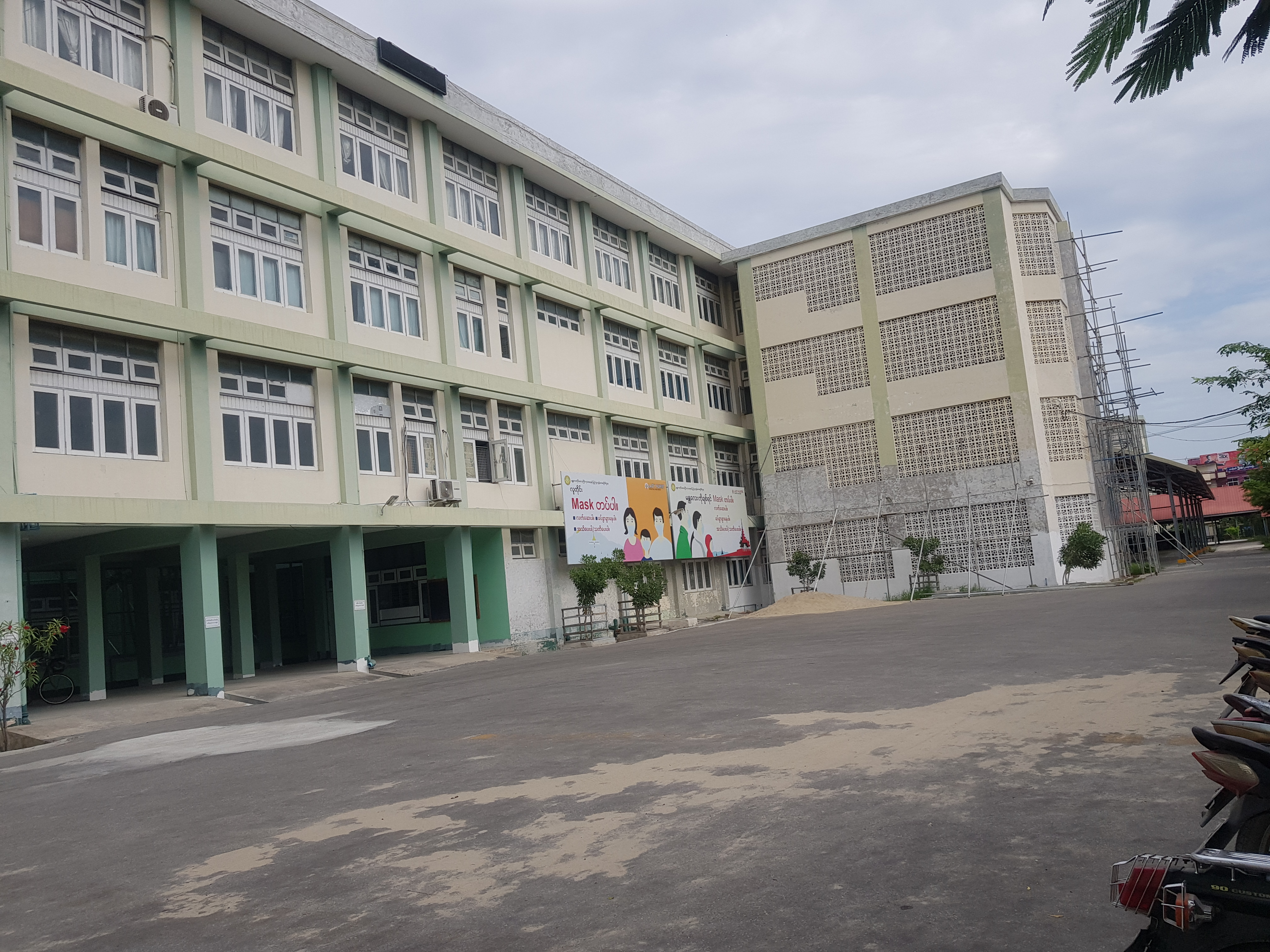
