= University of Nursing, Yangon =

Higher education institute in Yangon, Myanmar

Coordinates: 16°46′46.2″N 96°08′38.88″E

- သူနာပြု တက္ကသိုလ် (ရန်ကုန်)
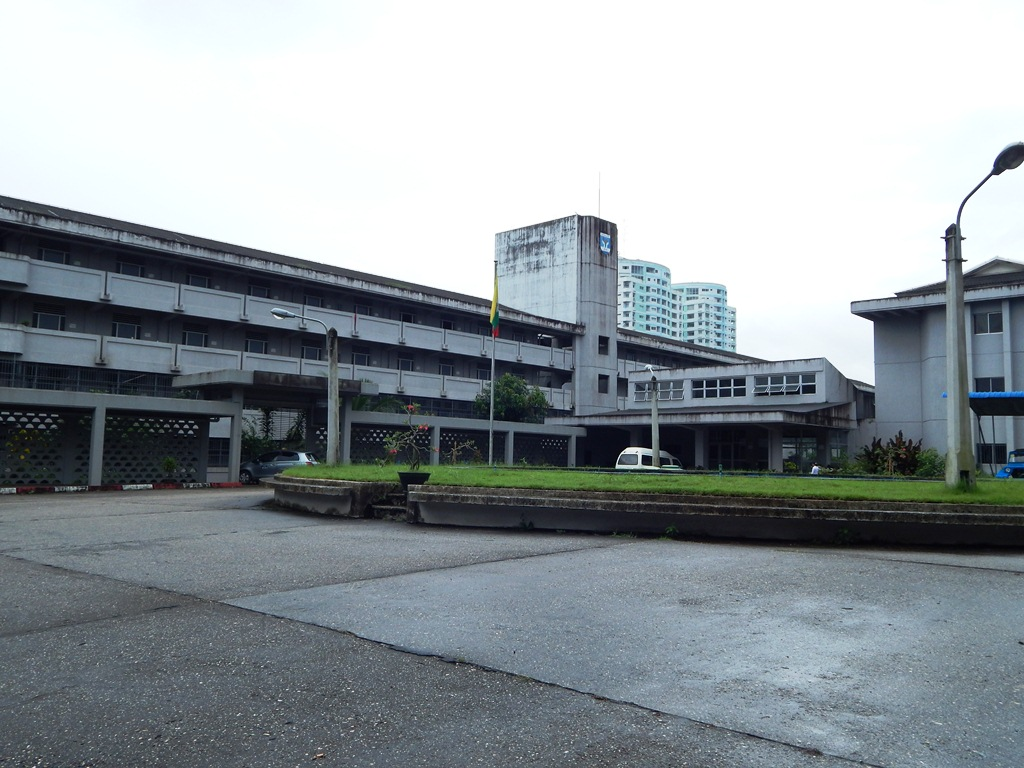
- Type: public
- Established: 1986; 40 years ago
- Affiliations: Ministry of Health
- Rector: Dr. Kyaw Shwe
- Location: 677-709 Bogyoke Aung San Road; Lanmadaw 11131, Yangon; Yangon Division, Myanmar
- Website: University of Nursing, Yangon

The University of Nursing, Yangon (Burmese: သူနာပြု တက္ကသိုလ် (ရန်ကုန်) [θùnàpjṵ tɛʔkəθò (jàɰ̃ɡòʊɰ̃)]; formerly The Institute of Nursing, Yangon) is a nursing university, located in Lanmadaw Township, Yangon, Myanmar. It is one of three universities in the country that offers a four-year bachelor's degree program in nursing (i.e. B.N.Sc (Generic)). The UON - Yangon also offers a master's degree program in nursing and diploma programs in dental, EENT, mental health, pediatrics, critical care, and orthopedics. Moreover, there is a two-year B.N.Sc (Bridge) program for in-service nurses who have earned a nursing diploma.

One of the most selective universities in the country, it only admits 150 students per year for generic program. Nursing is one of the few professions in Myanmar that provides decent job opportunities—inside or outside the country. The matriculation marks required for admission in 2013 was 440 out 600, slightly below what was required to go to medical school. The in-service nurses who want to enroll for the B.N.Sc (Bridge) program must have at least two-year service for the government and pass a selection exam which is usually held in October/November every year.

== History ==
The Yangon Institute of Nursing was established as the Nurses Training Center in 1986, and was upgraded to university status in 1991. In 1994 it became the first medical training facility in the country to offer a four-year, full-time BNSc degree program.

== Programs ==
The university offers undergraduate and graduate degrees in various fields of nursing.

- Bachelor of Nursing Science (BNSc)
- Master of Nursing Science (MNSc)
- Diploma in Speciality Nursing (dental, EENT, mental health, pediatrics, critical care, orthopedics)

Courses undertaken at the University of Nursing are eligible for credit transfers towards courses taken at the Open University of the UK.

== See also ==
Each of the following nursing universities also takes in 100 students per year.

- University of Nursing (Mandalay)
- Defence Services Institute of Nursing and Paramedical Science
