= Preventive and social medicine =

Branch of medicine

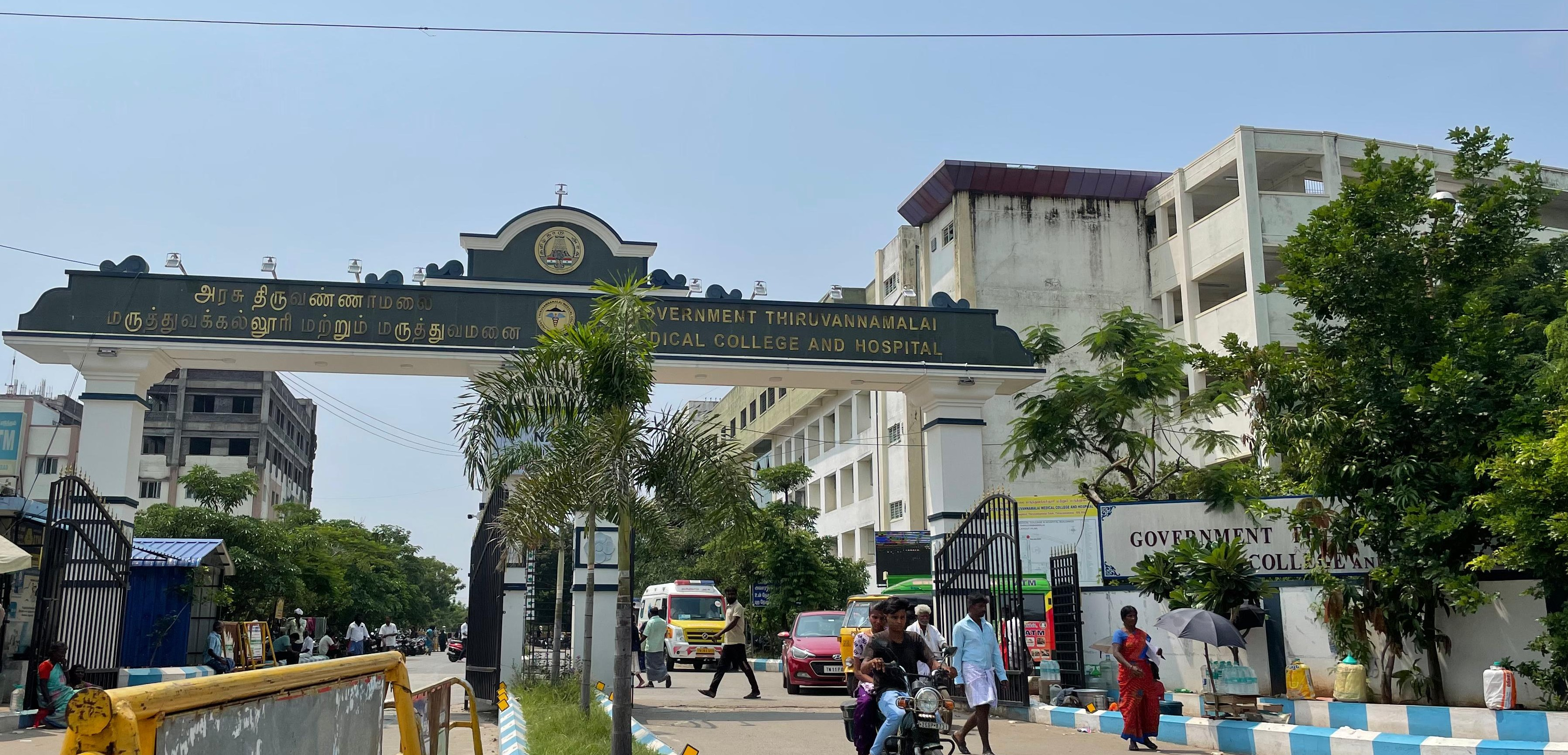

Preventive and social medicine is a branch of medicine dealing with providing health services in areas of prevention, promotion and treatment of rehabilitative diseases. Studies in preventive healthcare and social medicine are helpful in providing guided care, medicine in environmental health, offering scholarly services, formulating legal policy, consulting, and research in international work. While other fields of medicine deal primarily with individual health, preventive medicine focuses on community health, with individual efforts directed toward small groups, entire populations, and any size of group in between.

== History and objectives ==
Preventive and social medicine primarily deals with providing a complete health service in the fields of rehabilitation, curative medicine, preventive medicine, as well as health promotion. Preventive and social medicine operates at the community level unlike other fields of medicine that are concerned with individuals. This branch of medicine often deals with improving public health.

== Responsibilities ==
The practice of preventive and social medicine frequently involves managing and assessing surroundings. The main responsibilities of a preventative medicine practitioner include:

- Offering specialized services for people's health in defined populations
- Helping to prevent disease through protection and maintenance of health
- Assisting in preventing disability and premature death
- Managing and assessing health related to environmental or occupational factors

The field of preventive medicine covers a wide range of medical practices.

== Education ==
Preventative medicine physicians must acquire a doctoral degree in medicine - MD, DO, or MBBS. A preventative medicine physician undergoes a multi-year residency program similar to physicians specializing in other fields, such as surgery or radiology.

Other professionals in preventative and social medicine may have a bachelor's degree, master's degree, or other form of doctoral degree. The field is multi-disciplinary, and thus has a mixture of specialists and roles, such as forensic medicine specialists.

== See also ==
- Preventive healthcare
- Public health
- Habilitation (human development)
