= New Yangon =

New Yangon may refer to:

- New Yangon City, Yangon Region, Myanmar
- New Yangon General Hospital, Yangon, Yangon Region, Myanmar

== See also ==
- New Yangon Specialist Hospital, Downtown Yangon, Yangon, Yangon Region, Myanmar
- Yangon (disambiguation)
