= West Yangon =

West Yangon may refer to:

- West Yangon District, Yangon Region, Myanmar
- West Yangon General Hospital, Yangon Region, Myanmar
- University of West Yangon, Htantabin, Yangon Region, Myanmar

== See also ==
- West Yangon Technological University, Hlaingthaya, Yangon Region, Myanmar
- Yangon (disambiguation)
