= List of hospitals in Yangon =

This is a list of public and private hospitals and clinics in Yangon, Myanmar.

== Public ==
- 500-bed Specialty Hospital, Yangon
- Defence Services General Hospital (1000-bed)
- Defence Services Orthopaedic Hospital (500-Bed)
- Defence Services Obstetric, Gynaecological and Paediatric Hospital
- East Yangon General Hospital
- Insein General Hospital
- New Yangon General Hospital
- New Yangon Specialist Hospital
- No.2 Military Hospital (500-bed)
- North Okkalapa General Hospital
- South Okkalapa Women and Children Hospital
- Thingangyun Sanpya Hospital
- Universities Hospital
- Waibargi Hospital
- West Yangon General Hospital
- Yangon Central Women's Hospital
- Yangon Children's Hospital
- Yangon ENT Hospital
- Yangon General Hospital
- Yangon Orthopaedic Hospital
- Yangon Workers' Hospital
- Yangon Mental Health Hospital
- Yankin Children's Hospital

== Private ==
- Academy Hospital
- အရူးဆေးရုံ International Hospital
- Asia Royal Hospital
- Aung Yadana Hospital
- Royal Dragon (တော်ဝင်နဂါး) Diagnostic Center
- Bahosi Hospital
- Chan Myae Mitta
- Dagon Medicare Hospital
- East West Parami
- Family General Hospital
- Gadayhtay Hospital
- Grand Hantha International Hospital
- Green Cross Hospital
- Guru Nanak Hospital
- Hla Tun Hospice Cancer Foundation
- Jivitadana Sangha Hospital (for Buddhist clergy)
- Kan Thar Yar International Specialist Hospital
- Kwe Kabaw Hospital
- Lumbini Hospital
- Mahar Myaing Hospital
- MMCW
- Muslim Free Dispensary & Medical Relief Society
- Mya Parami Hospital
- Myint Myat Taw Win
- Moe Myittar Hospital
- OSC Hospital
- Pinlon Hospital
- Parami General Hospital
- Pun Hlaing International Hospital
- Rose Hill Hospital
- Sakura Hospital
- Shin Pa Ku
- Shwe Baho
- Shwegondaing Specialist Centre (SSC)
- Shwepadauk Hospital
- Shwe La Min
- Tet Lann Hospital
- Thukha Kabar Hospital
- Thukha Waddy Hospital
- University Avenue Health Centre (UHC)
- Witoriya Hospital
- Yangon Medical Center
- Mya Parami Hospital
- Byar Dake Pan Hospital
- Thukha Waddy Hospital
