= East Yangon =

East Yangon may refer to:

- East Yangon District, Yangon Region, Myanmar
- East Yangon General Hospital, Botataung, Yangon Region, Myanmar
- East Yangon University, Thanlyin, Yangon Region, Myanmar

== See also ==
- Yangon (disambiguation)
