= Rangoon (disambiguation) =

Rangoon, Burma; or Yangon, is the former capital city of Myanmar, located in Rangoon Region

Rangoon may also refer to:

== Places ==
- Rangoon, West Virginia, United States; an unincorporated community in Barbour County
- Rangiora, Canterbury, South Island, New Zealand; a town nicknamed "Rangoon" and "Goon"

=== Myanmar ===
- Yangon Region, Myanmar; also known as Rangoon Region, Burma
- Yangon River, Myanmar; also known as the Rangoon River in Burma, which flows through the city of Yangon
- Rangoon Airport, Rangoon Region, Burma
- Apostolic Vicariate of Rangoon, Burma, Roman Catholic Church

== Arts, entertainment, media ==
- Rangoon (2017 Hindi film)
- Rangoon (2017 Tamil film)
- Octoroon Rangoon, a track in the music of Homestuck

== Groups, organizations ==
- Rangoon Oil Company, East India Company
- Rangoon University, Rangoon, Burma
- Rangoon Bistro, Portland, Oregon, USA; a Burmese restaurant
- Rangoon Brigade, Burma Division, British India Army

== Other uses ==
- Sophar Rangoon (1817–1890), a royal hostage taken held captive by the Duke of Sussex
- Crab Rangoon, a type of dumpling found in American Chinese cuisine
- Short Rangoon, a British flying-boat of the 1930s
- Fall of Rangoon (1942)

== See also ==
- Yangon (disambiguation)
