= New Yangon Specialist Hospital =

Geography
- Location: Yangon, Yangon Region, Myanmar
- Coordinates: 16.781646°N 96.143334°E

Organisation
- Type: Public hospital
- Affiliated university: University of Medicine 1, Yangon
- Network: Ministry of Health and Sports (Myanmar)

Services
- Beds: 316

History
- Constructed: 2021
- Opened: 2021

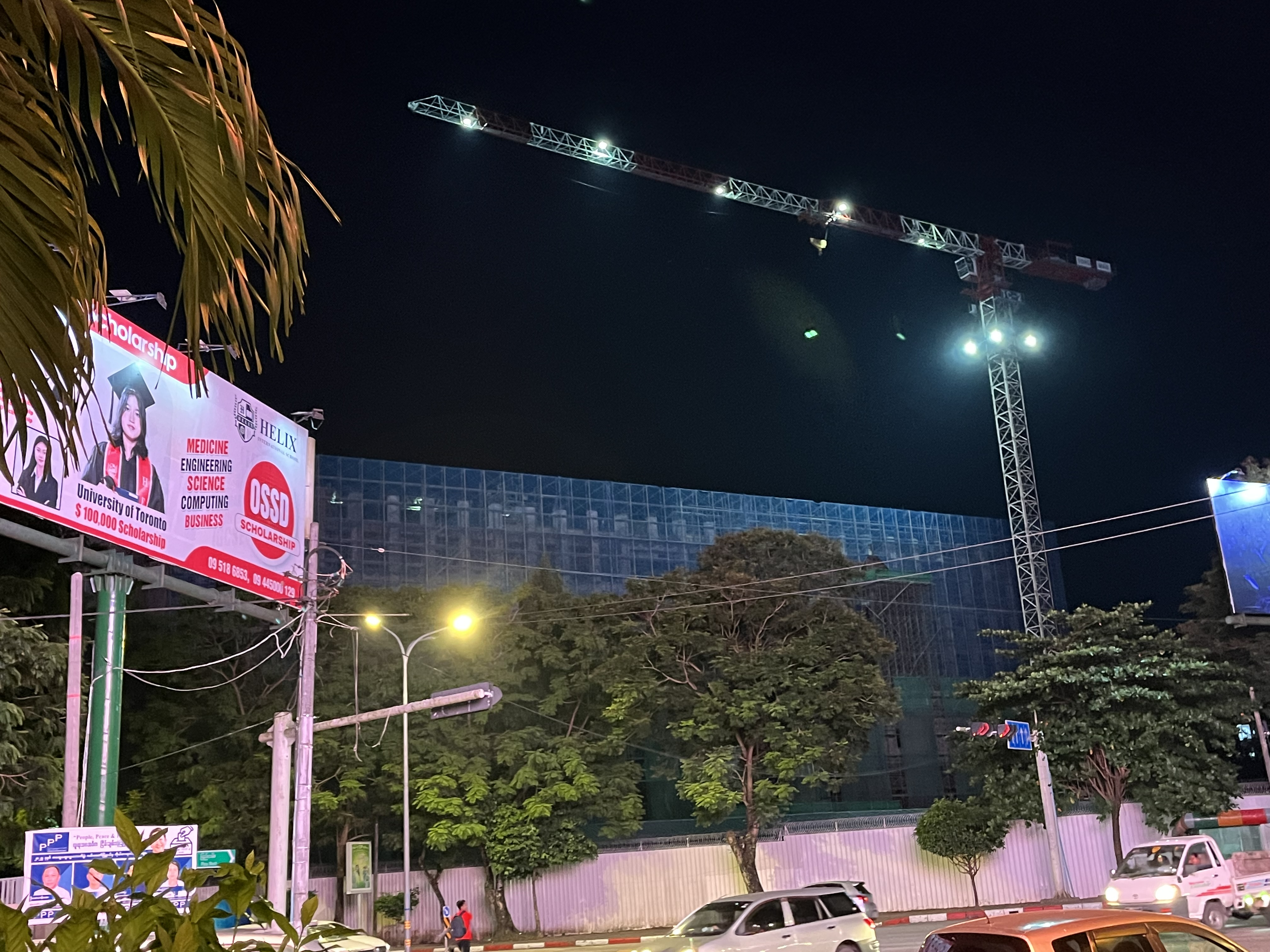
New Yangon Specialist Hospital under construction

New Yangon Specialist Hospital (Burmese: ရန်ကုန်အထူးကုဆေးရုံသစ်ကြီး) is an under-construction specialty public hospital in Downtown Yangon, Myanmar. The hospital will provide specialty services, and will be Myanmar's first national teaching and research institute for cerebral and cardiovascular diseases.

The hospital is located on the corner of Pyay and Minye Kyawswa Roads in Yangon's Lanmadaw Township, across the street from New Yangon General Hospital and 500–bed Specialty Hospital, Yangon.

The construction of New Yangon Specialist Hospital was funded by a US$77 million Japanese grant provided by the Japan International Cooperation Agency, the largest such grant aid project in the country, while the remainder of the costs (US$27 million) will be borne by the Burmese government. The hospital's groundbreaking ceremony was held on 28 April 2019, with plans for completion by 30 April 2021.

The seven-story hospital will be 27,000 square metres (290,000 sq ft), and will include a 316 beds over a space of including a 20-bed ICU ward. Four departments from the existing Yangon General Hospital, namely neurosurgery, neurology, cardiac surgery, and cardiology, will be relocated to this new hospital, New Yangon Specialist Hospital will also serve as a teaching hospital for the nearby University of Medicine 1, Yangon.

== See also ==
- List of hospitals in Yangon
