= Yangon Children's Hospital =

Coordinates: 16°47′18.00″N 96°8′11.10″E

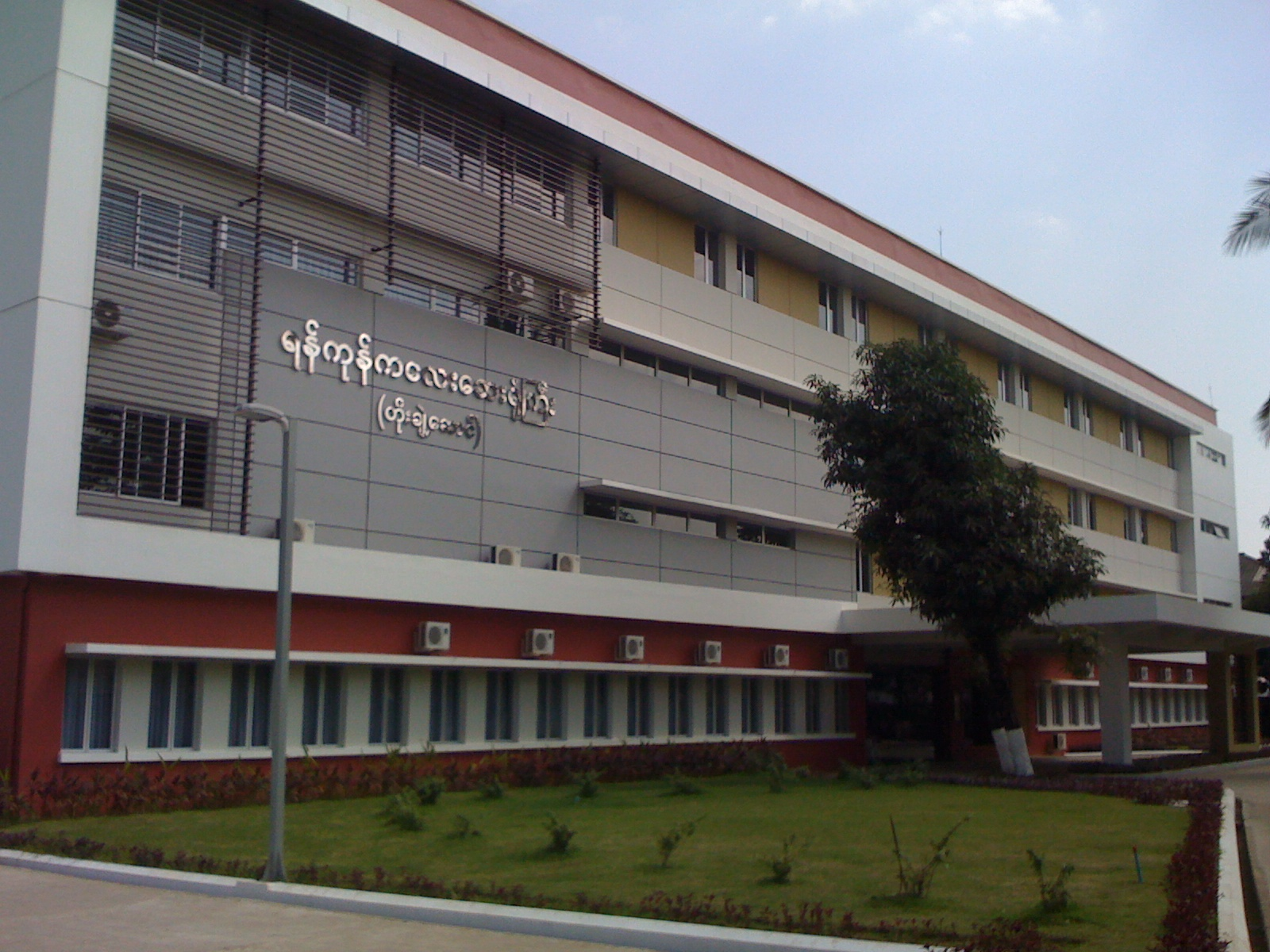

Geography
- Location: 2 Pyidaungzu Yeiktha Road, Yangon, Yangon Division, Myanmar

Organisation
- Type: Teaching
- Affiliated university: University of Medicine 1, Yangon

Services
- Emergency department: Yes
- Beds: 1300

History
- Founded: 1960

The Yangon Children's Hospital (YCH) (Burmese: ရန်ကုန်ကလေးဆေးရုံကြီး) is a major public hospital in Yangon, Myanmar. The hospital was formerly known as "Jamatkhana Hospital" as it was built on the site of former Gymkhana Club, an elite social club during the colonial era. The YCH was established in 1960 under the Yangon General Hospital with a capacity of 60 beds. In 1962–1963, the hospital moved to Myenigon with the capacity of 80 beds. In 1963, the hospital moved again to the current 8.73-acre (3.53 ha) compound. The current main building was built in 1970 with Canadian aid, and opened in September 1978. Since then, a new three-story annex building with 550 beds has been added.

== Intensive Care Unit (ICU) ==
The ICU was renovated in 2009 with full equipment donated by Levi Sap Nei Thang, the founder of I Love Myanmar, in memory of her daughter Emmanuel Chia Ai Linn, who was admitted to the Yangon Children's Hospital before her death in 2008.

== Gallery ==
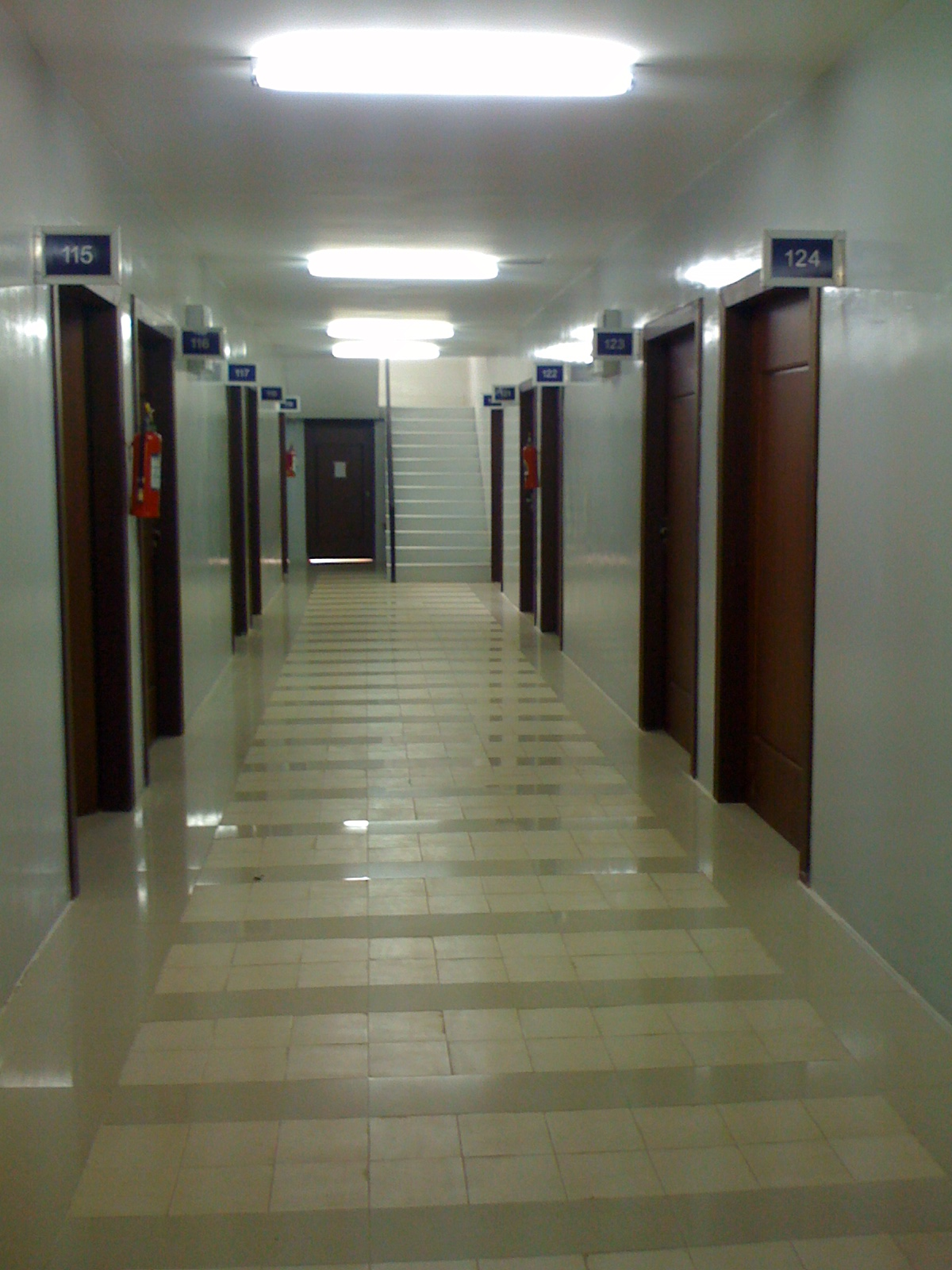
Private rooms in the new hospital

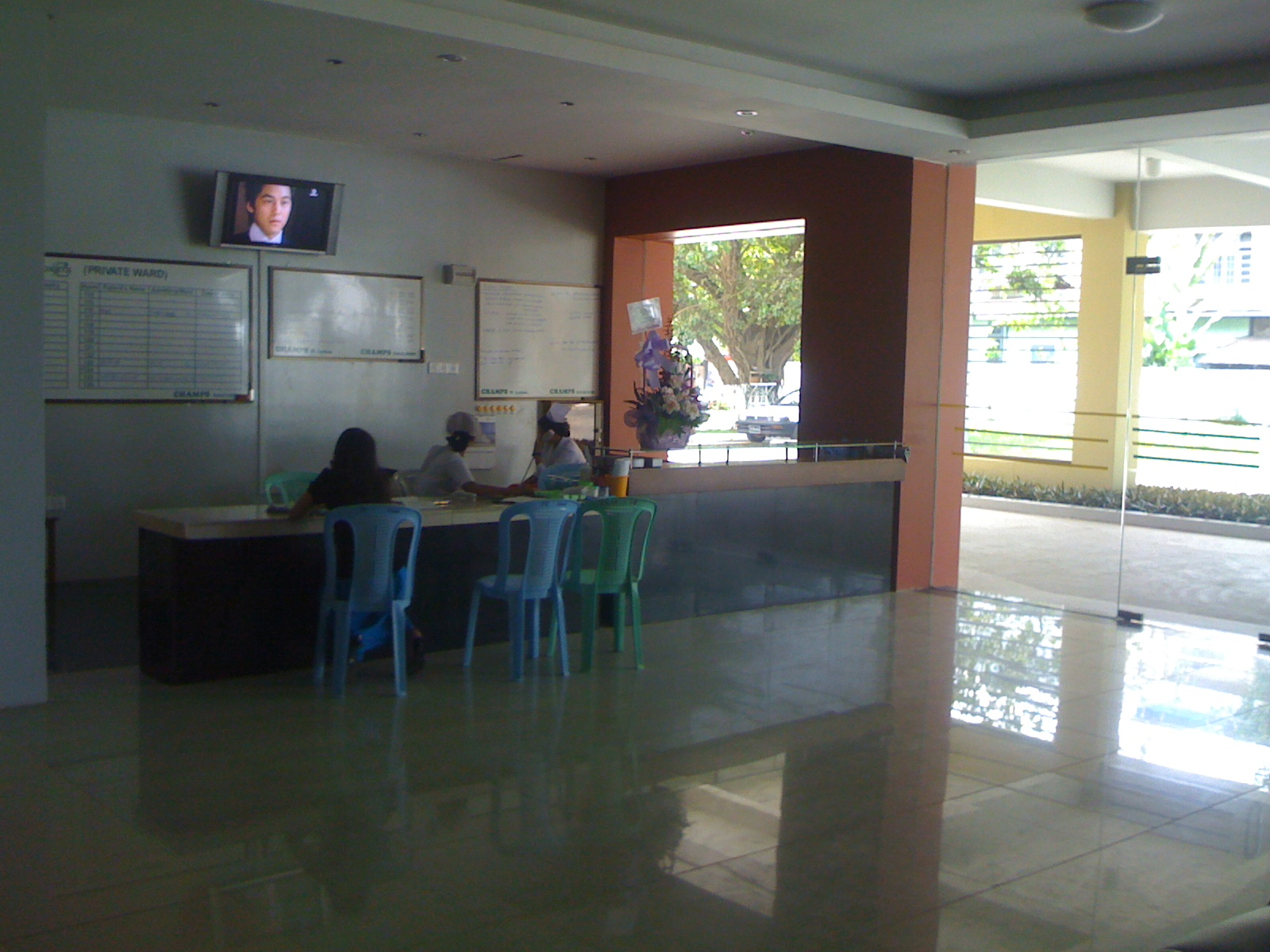
Reception desk at the new hospital

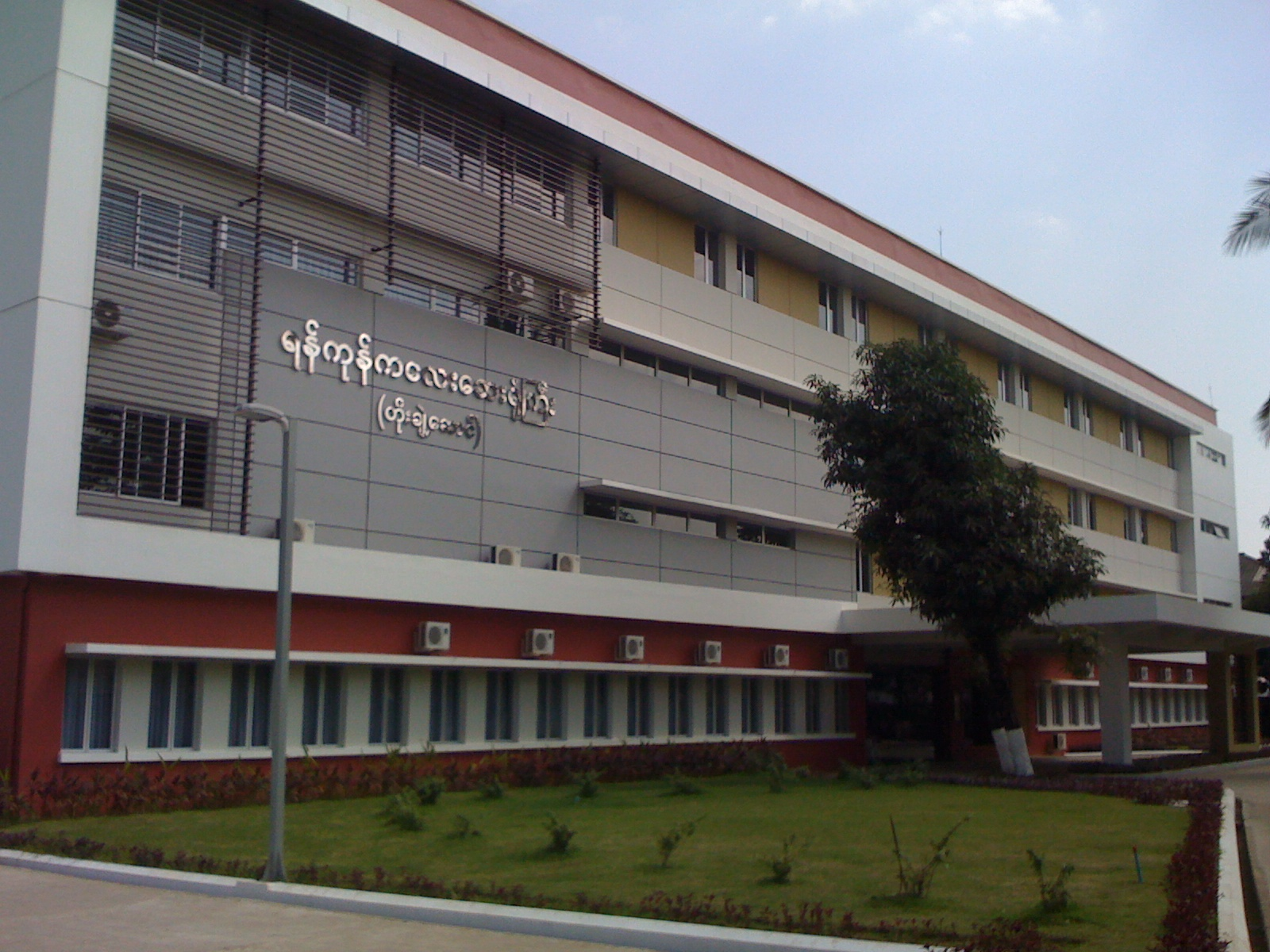
New building of the Yangon Children's Hospital

== See also ==
- List of hospitals in Yangon
