= Thingangyun Sanpya Hospital =

Hospital in Yangon, Myanmar

Coordinates: 16°50′03.9″N 96°11′25.6″E

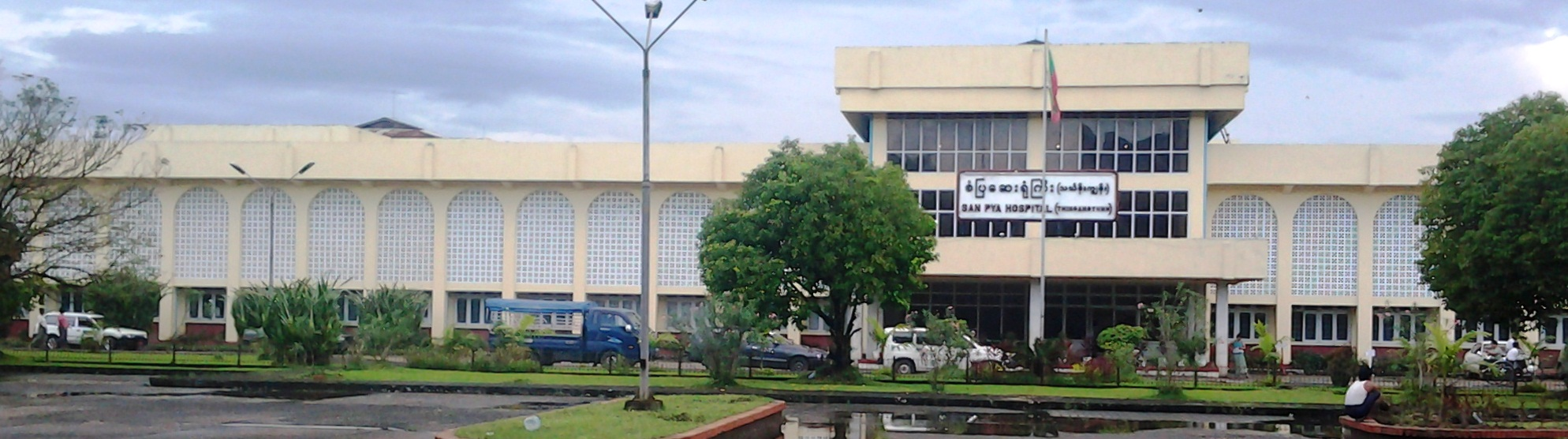

Geography
- Location: Kyaikkasan Pagoda Road, Thingangyun Township, Yangon, Yangon Region, Myanmar

Organisation
- Type: Teaching
- Affiliated university: University of Medicine 2, Yangon

Services
- Emergency department: Yes
- Beds: 500

History
- Founded: 1994

Links
- Lists: Hospitals in Myanmar

The Thingangyun Sanpya Hospital (Burmese: သင်္ဃန်းကျွန်း စံပြ ဆေးရုံ) is one of the major public hospitals in Yangon, Myanmar. It is located in Thingangyun Township, which is about 10 km (6.2 mi) from downtown Yangon. It is a 500-bed hospital for 1.3 million population. It is also a teaching hospital affiliated with University of Medicine 2, Yangon.

== History ==
Construction of the hospital was started on 2 April 1991 and finished on 31 March 1994. Health services were provided in the hospital since 21 May 1994.

== Catchment areas ==
Six areas are under catchment areas of the hospital.

- Thingangyun
- South Dagon
- North Dagon
- Thuwanna
- South Okkalapa
- Tamwe

== Specialist unit ==
The leading specialty with the highest number of admission in 2009 were medical ward followed by OG, surgical and child ward.

- Medical Ward
- Surgical Ward
- Obstetrics & Gynaecology (OG) Ward
- Child Medical Ward
- Child Surgical Ward
- Orthopaedic Ward
- Uro-Surgical Ward
- Uro-Medical Ward
- Gastrointestinal Ward
- Chest Medical Ward
- Chest Surgical Ward
- Eye Ward
- Psychiatric OPD
- Ear, Nose & Throat (ENT) OPD
- Dental OPD
- Nuclear Medicine OPD
- Physiotherapy OPD

== Supportive departments ==
- Anaesthesia & ICU
- Pathology & Blood Bank
- Radiology (X-ray, USG, MRI, CT)
- Medicosocial Work
- Pharmacy & Medical Store
- Autoclave
- Gas Station
- Kitchen & Laundry
- Mortuary

== Teaching programs ==
Thingangyun Sanpya Hospital is one of the teaching hospitals of the University of Medicine 2, Yangon.

- Undergraduate Training
  - 3rd Year
  - Final Part II
- House Surgeon Training
- Post Graduate Training
  - Diploma & Master Courses

== See also ==
- List of hospitals in Yangon
