= Yangon ENT Hospital =

Coordinates: 16°48′0″N 96°10′0″E

Yangon Ear, Nose, Throat Hospital
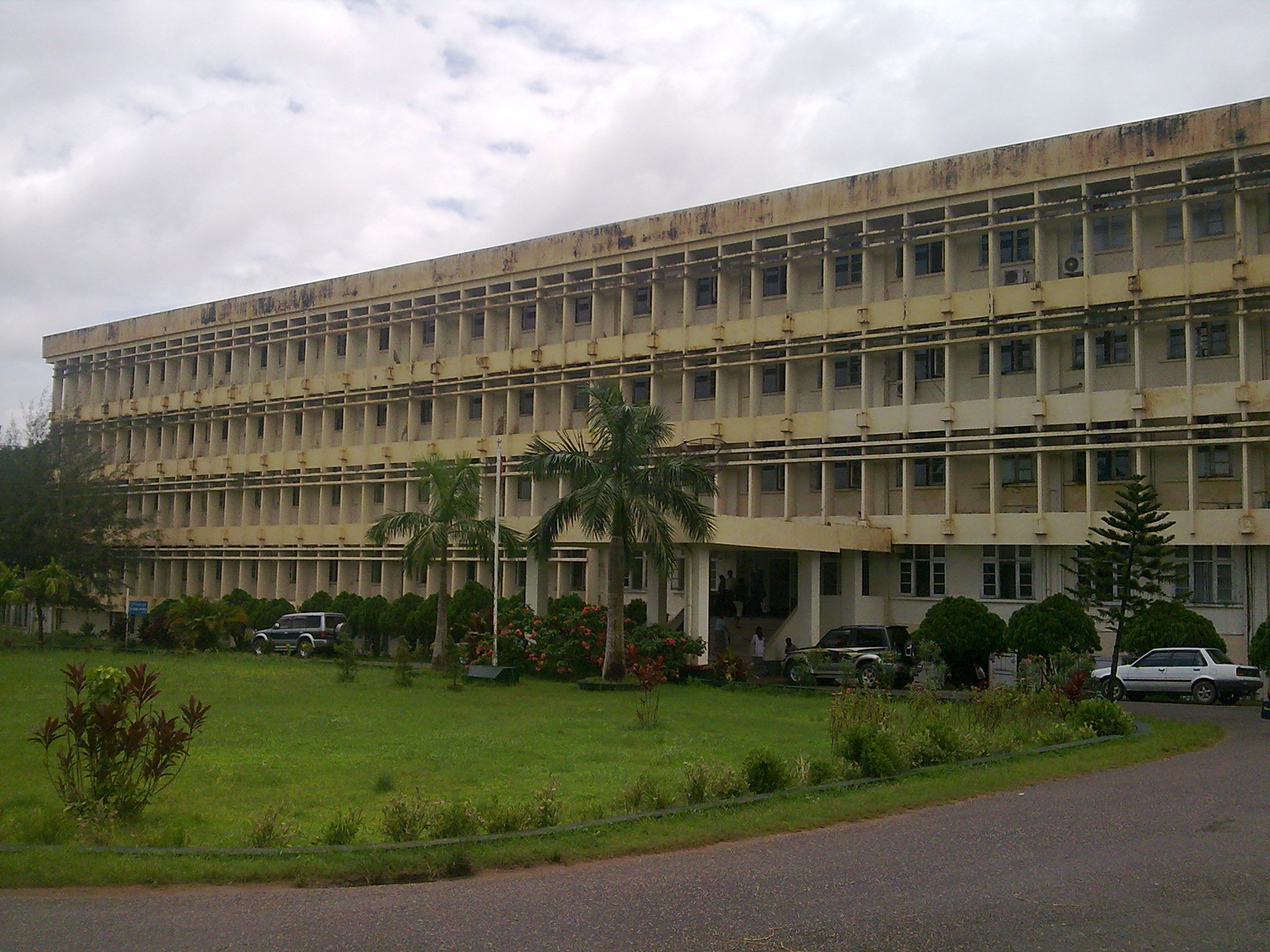

Geography
- Location: Binnya Dala Road, Tamwe, Yangon, Yangon Division, Myanmar

Organisation
- Type: Teaching
- Affiliated university: University of Medicine 1, Yangon

Services
- Emergency department: Yes

History
- Founded: 2000

The Yangon Ear, Nose and Throat Hospital (Burmese: ရန်ကုန် နား နှာခေါင်း လည်ချောင်း ဆေးရုံ) is a public specialist hospital located in Yangon, Myanmar. The Yangon ENT Hospital was previously called the Yangon Eye, Ear, Nose and Throat (EENT) Hospital and was located on Alanpya Road. It was moved to the current location in 2000.

== See also ==
- List of hospitals in Yangon
