= Yankin Children's Hospital =

Coordinates: 16°47′18.00″N 96°8′11.10″E

Geography
- Location: Thitsar Road, Yankin Township, Yangon, Yangon Division, Myanmar

Organisation
- Type: Teaching

Services
- Beds: 550

History
- Founded: 2011

The Yankin Children's Hospital (Burmese: ရန်ကင်းကလေးဆေးရုံကြီး) is a major public hospital in Yangon, Myanmar. The hospital was established in 2011 with a capacity of 550 beds.

== See also ==
- List of hospitals in Yangon
