= Yangon Mental Health Hospital =

Psychiatric hospital in Yangon Region, Myanmar

Coordinates: 16°57′45.5″N 96°15′42.6″E

Yangon Psychiatric (Mental) Health Hospital

Geography
- Location: 164, No (7) Main Road, Ywar Thar Gyi Ward, East Dagon Township, Yangon, Yangon Region, Myanmar

Organisation
- Type: Teaching
- Affiliated university: University of Medicine 1, Yangon and University of Medicine 2, Yangon

Services
- Emergency department: Yes
- Beds: 1200

Links
- Lists: Hospitals in Myanmar

The Yangon Psychiatric (Mental) Health Hospital (Burmese: ရွာသာကြီး စိတ်ကျန်းမာရေး ဆေးရုံကြီး) is one of the two major mental health hospitals in Myanmar. The 1,200-bed hospital is located at Ywar Thar Gyi Ward in East Dagon Township, and was previously known as Ywar Thar Gyi Psychiatric Hospital.

The hospital mainly focuses on curative treatment and also serves as a referral and specialist hospital. While the out-patient department in the hospital is for patients with mild psychiatric disorders, patients with severe mental illness are admitted in the hospital. Although a day-care center was established in the hospital for both children and adults with mental disorders, it is no longer functioning due to long travel distance to the hospital.

== History ==
The long history of psychiatric care in Myanmar started in 1886 when the British authorities built a "prison for the insane" near the City Prison in Rangoon (later known as Yangon) in order to merely contain the mentally ill people, starting with 50 inmates. In 1926 soon after the First World War ended, a new facility named Tadagalay was established 8 miles from Yangon, with 250 residents. The asylum was named after the nearby village Tadagalay, which means a small bridge. During the Second World War, most of the buildings in the asylum were destroyed as it was occupied by the Japanese army.

Although a temporary accommodation was provided for 45 patients near the Insein Prison during 1945, all patients were transferred back to Tadagalay after a year. Dr. Walter Chit Tun, one of Burma's First Great Myanmar and a Burmese movie star served as Superintendent of Rangoon Mental Hospital (Tadalay) before 1947. Along with the independence of the country, name of the asylum was changed into the Mental Hospital.

During 1951, the remarkable year for psychiatric care in Myanmar, the first qualified psychiatrist at the mental hospital named Dr. Ne Win returned to the country from London after his psychiatric training. He replaced the custodial care, such as isolating patients and using of straitjacket, with hospital-based care. He became the Medical Superintendent in 1960. Later, the hospital was renamed as State Mental Hospital in 1962 and as Rangoon Psychiatric Hospital in 1967. Thus, he is known to be the "Father of Psychiatry" in the country nowadays.

In 2000s, all patients were transferred to the recent hospital in Ywar Thar Gyi, which was later called as the Mental Health Hospital.

== Teaching programs ==
The Yangon Mental Health Hospital is also one of the teaching hospitals affiliated with [[University of Medicine 1, Yangon] and [University of Medicine 2, Yangon]].

== See also ==
- List of hospitals in Yangon
