= 500–bed Specialty Hospital, Yangon =

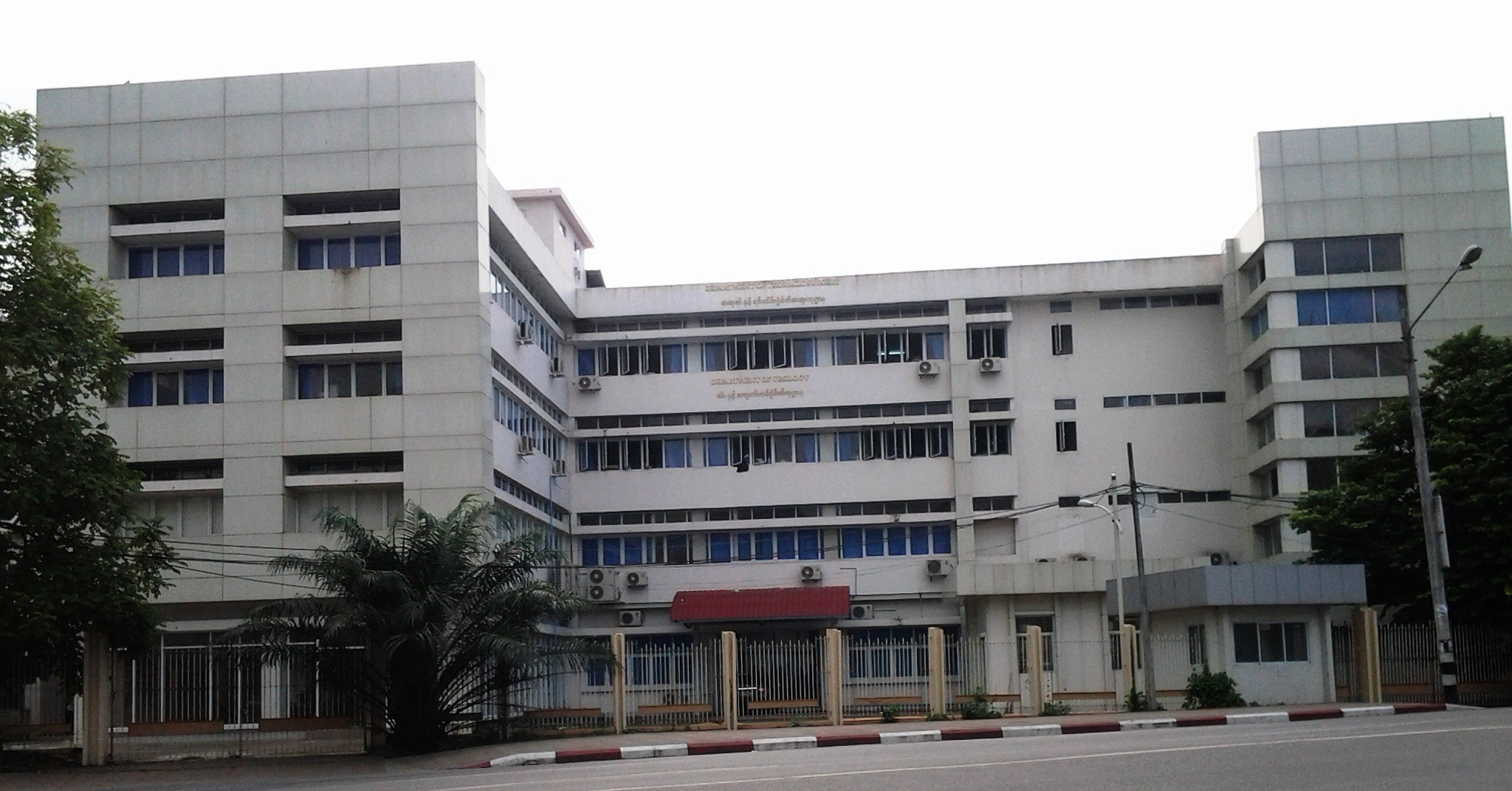

Geography
- Location: Lanmadaw 11131, Yangon, Yangon Region, Myanmar
- Coordinates: 16.783100°N 96.142593°E

Organisation
- Type: Teaching
- Affiliated university: University of Medicine 1, Yangon, University of Medicine 2, Yangon

Services
- Emergency department: Yes
- Beds: 500
- Speciality: Hepatology, rheumatology, urology

History
- Founded: 2014

Links
- Lists: Hospitals in Myanmar

The 500–bed Specialty Hospital, Yangon (Burmese: ခုတင်(၅၀၀)ဆံ့ အထူးကုဆေးရုံကြီး ရန်ကုန်) is a specialty hospital in Yangon, Myanmar (Burma), which was formally opened on 25 Aug 2014. It is located on Min Ye Kyaw Swar Road in Lanmadaw Township and 20-minute walk from Yangon General Hospital. It was established by renovating the building that the Ministry of Energy used in the past. It was built by the Ministry of Health, Myanmar in cooperation with 4 private companies: Original Group, A1, Golden Flower and Shwe Taung Development. Over 7.6 million USD was provided by the companies and the Ministry of Health was responsible for interior decoration, equipment and staff. It is aimed to be the country's main facility for liver and kidney transplants in the future.

Health services have been provided in the hospital since 1 January 2014 while the operation theater and special departments became operational at the end of June 2014. With the support of the government, a modular operation theater and air handing unit and a special ward have been operating since 30 June 2014. From January to July 2014, a total of 4,385 patients were admitted in the hospital and 13,246 patients visited the hospital.

There are 5 professors, 8 senior consultants, 22 junior consultants, 25 civil assistant surgeons and 130 nurses in the hospital.

It is also a Tertiary Care Teaching Hospital affiliated with University of Medicine 1, Yangon and University of Medicine 2, Yangon.

== Departments ==
There are 8 specialist departments and 12 auxiliary departments in the hospital. Departments of hepatology and urology, and 4 specialist units from Yangon General Hospital and New Yangon General Hospital were moved to the hospital. Rheumatology Department in the hospital is the first rheumatology department in Myanmar.

=== Specialist departments ===
- Department of Hepatology
- Department of Hepatobiliary Surgery
- Department of Nephrology
- Department of Respiratory Medicine
- Department of Rheumatology
- Department of Thoracic Surgery
- Department of Urology
- Physical Medicine & Rehabilitation Unit

=== Diagnostics departments ===
- Radiology Department
- Pathology Department

== Teaching programs ==
The 500-bed Specialty Hospital is one of the teaching hospitals of the University of Medicine 1, Yangon and University of Medicine 2, Yangon for pre-graduate and post-graduate programmes and courses.

== See also ==
- List of hospitals in Yangon
