= Expo 2019 =

World horticultural exposition held in Beijing, China

EXPO 2019 Beijing

Overview
- BIE-class: Horticultural exposition
- Name: Expo 2019
- Motto: "Building a Beautiful Home Featuring Harmonious Coexistence between Man and Nature"

Location
- Country: China
- City: Beijing
- Coordinates: 40°26′17″N 115°56′40″E

Timeline
- Opening: April 29, 2019
- Closure: October 7, 2019

Horticultural expositions
- Previous: Expo 2016 in Antalya
- Next: Expo 2022 in Almere

Specialized expositions
- Previous: Expo 2017 in Astana
- Next: Expo 2027 in Belgrade

Universal expositions
- Previous: Expo 2015 in Milan
- Next: Expo 2020 in Dubai

Internet
- Website: www.horti-expo2019.org

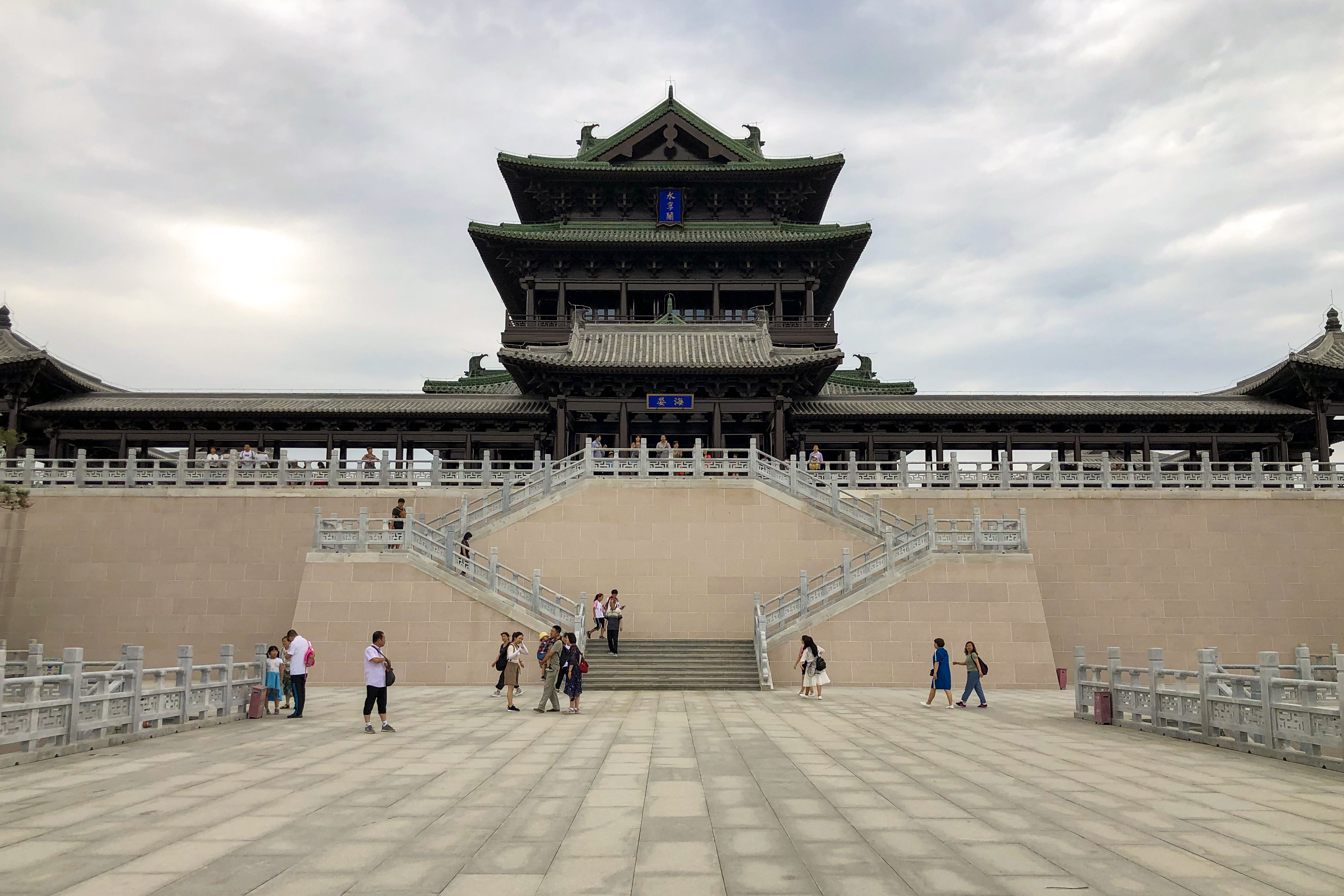
Yongning Pavilion, a 27-meter tall wooden pavilion above a 25-meter foundation

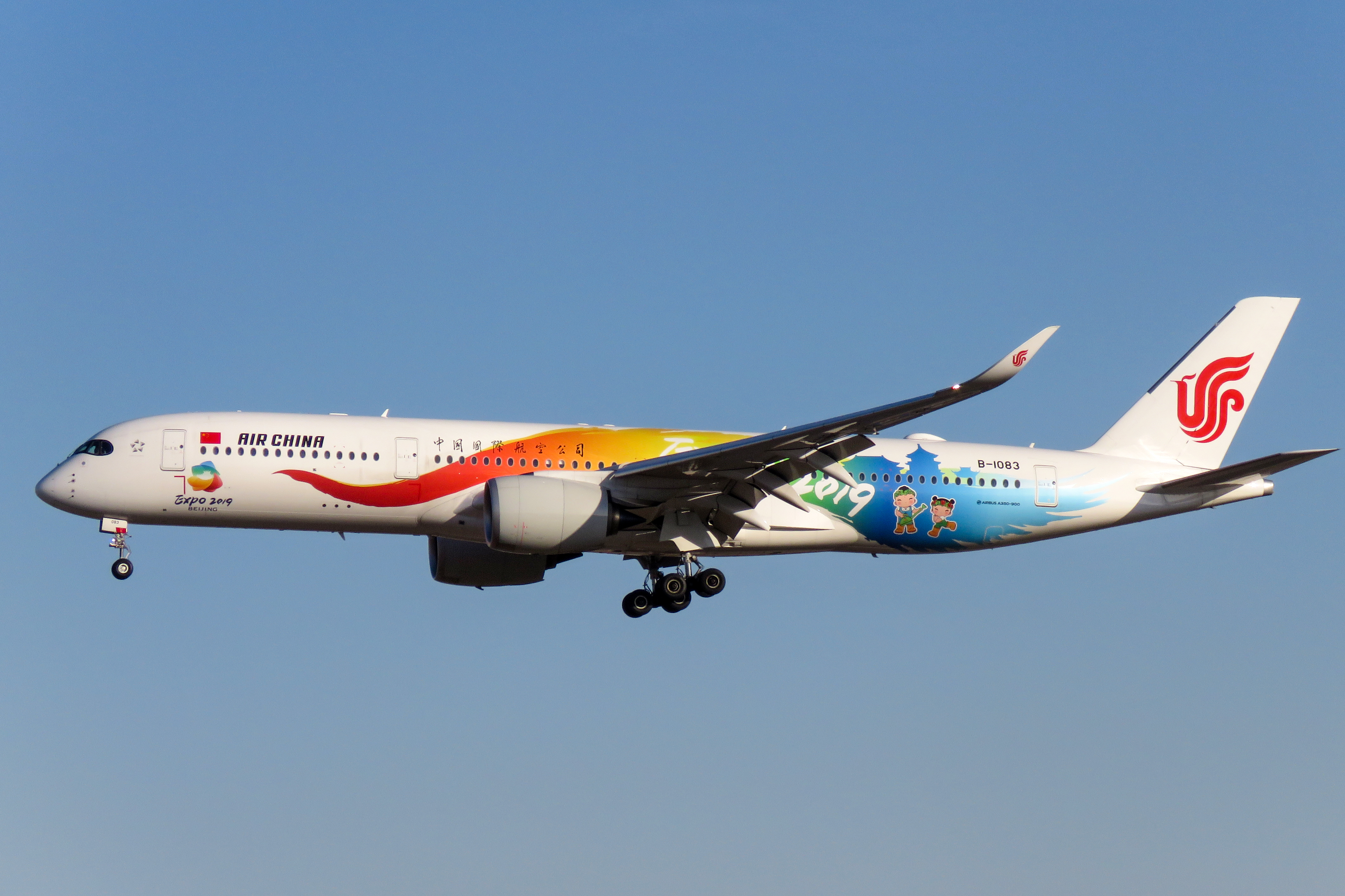
An Air China Airbus A350 in Expo 2019 special livery

Expo 2019 was an international horticultural exposition presented by the Bureau International des Expositions and was held in Yanqing District, Beijing, China. Expo 2016 in Antalya, Turkey was the previous one. The exposition began on 29 April 2019 and closed on 7 October 2019. The site was 503 hectares, and 16 million visitors were expected.

It was the largest ever gardening show. Two villages were relocated for the expo.
