= Levi Sap Nei Thang =

Burmese land flipper

- လီဗီစပ်နိုင်ထန်း
- Born: Chin State, Myanmar
- Occupations: Entrepreneur, philanthropist
- Years active: 2001–present
- Organization(s): I Love Myanmar, Emanuel Foundation
- Known for: Founder of I Love Myanmar; mass purchase and resale of U.S. federal oil and gas leases
- Spouse: Daniel Lim (divorced)
- Children: 1 (deceased)

Levi Sap Nei Thang (Burmese: လီဗီစပ်နိုင်ထန်း) is a Burmese-born American perfume entrepreneur known for purchasing hundreds of federal leases from the Bureau of Land Management and flipping them to Burmese immigrants at high profit margins. She is well known for scamming working-class Burmese immigrants and refugees residing in United States. In June 2025, she was found liable for fraud and civil racketeering in a Los Angeles federal court and ordered to pay $3.2 million in damages after defrauding working-class immigrants and refugees through these lease sales.

== Fraud allegations and RICO judgment ==
In June 2025, Thang was found liable for fraud and civil racketeering following a lawsuit filed in a Los Angeles federal court by a group of Burmese immigrants and refugees operating as the Levi Sap Nei Thang Victims Association. The plaintiffs accused her of leveraging her celebrity status and Facebook Live broadcasts to sell U.S. Bureau of Land Management public oil and gas leases at heavily inflated prices, under the false pretense that she was an energy sector expert who would help them build and drill profitable wells. U.S. District Judge Hernán Vera ordered Thang to pay $3.2 million in total damages, characterizing her business practices as causing severe economic devastation to blue-collar workers who lost their entire life savings. The multi-million dollar judgment included $457,000 in direct economic damages, $1.4 million in punitive damages, and $1.4 million in treble damages under the Federal Racketeer Influenced and Corrupt Organizations (RICO) Act. Thang denied the fraud characterization and filed an appeal against the federal court judgment, with appellate proceedings continuing into mid-2026.

== Impact on Burmese refugee community ==
The victims of the lease-flipping scheme consisted primarily of working-class Burmese immigrants and refugees residing in the United States. According to federal court findings, the plaintiffs generally possessed limited English proficiency and had no prior experience in the energy or financial sectors. Thang utilized Facebook Live streams to systematically market the federal oil and gas leases directly to this community, capitalizing on her established regional celebrity status. She enticed buyers by offering assurances that the investments would provide a pathway to "generational wealth" and promised that she and her brother would actively manage and assist in drilling the wells.

The court determined that the victims collectively depleted their life savings to purchase the non-productive public leases at massive markups, suffering severe economic harm. To pursue legal remedy, a group of approximately a dozen affected buyers formally organized as the Levi Sap Nei Thang Victims Association to launch the civil suit.

== Books and publications ==
Levi Sap Nei Thang is an author and independent publisher whose works span psychology, emotional healing, poetry, children’s literature, educational writing, and research-based publications.

Selected works include:

- Poverty Bitterness Syndrome
- Poetry collections
- Children’s storybooks based on true stories from her children’s lives
- Children’s coloring book series

== Career ==
=== Business ===
Levi was born in Chin State, Myanmar, and immigrated to the United States in 2000. She launched the Myanmar Bible Software in 2006, which includes 16 Bibles of the ethnic languages in Myanmar. The software project was started in 2003 in partnership with Myanmar Bible Society, the United Bible Society (UBS) and the CrossWire Bible Society. She is representing Myanmar at Expo 2023 Kahramanmaraş in Turkey. She signed a contract with Mayor Hanefi Machcicek of Onikişubat City, Kahramamanras. Levi represented Myanmar at Expo 2016 in Antalya, Turkey. She represented Myanmar and designed the Myanmar Pavilion at the 2018 Taichung World Flora Exposition in Taichung, Taiwan.

Registered in Wyoming in July, Levi Sap Nei Thang LLC is one of her companies, with offices claimed in seven states. Additionally, her cosmetics business operates out of Los Angeles, while a foundation established in honor of her late daughter is headquartered in Missouri. She became a public figure in the Burmese immigrant community, describing herself on Facebook as a successful businesswoman, and a philanthropist. CNN reports that she is the deputy director of Myanmar Pavilion, which says she was appointed by the previous government of Aung San Suu Kyi.

== Music career ==
In 2026, Levi Sap Nei Thang released the album Childhood Memories, a 15-track collection described as a tribute to her parents and formative years. The album features songs in multiple languages, reflecting her background in Chin State and her fluency in Burmese. Notable tracks from the album include "I Was The Girl," "Gum & Sweet," and "I Was Bullied."

My Little Offering is a Christian gospel album by Levi Sap Nei Thang, released on February 14, 2026. The album comprises 15 tracks, including nine English songs and six multilingual renditions in Arabic, Chinese, Hebrew, Hindi, Malay, and Persian. It was released on major music streaming platforms worldwide.

Prior to her international career, she represented indigenous communities in Myanmar, performing patriotic songs on national television and at official state banquets. Her musical style is characterized by a blend of personal storytelling, faith-based themes, and cultural identity.

=== Humanitarian ===
Levi founded the charitable organization I Love Myanmar in 2001, which has provided many relief aids to the people affected by Cyclone Nargis since 2008. Her daughter died while she was supporting the victims of the cyclone. She has donated the Intensive Care Unit (ICU) to Yangon Children's Hospital and medicines to other hospitals in Chin State in memory of her daughter Emanuel. She has also established the Emanuel Foundation.

She donated 286 houses for storm survivors in Daukkyi and Thechaung, Bogale, the southern part of Myanmar. The donation was accepted by Brig-Gen Kyaw Myint, the Deputy Minister of Social Welfare, Relief, and Resettlement of Myanmar.

Levi was married to Daniel Lim who for many years was CEO of the International House of Prayer (IHOPKC), alongside Mike Bickle who, in 2023, confessed to sexual misconduct.
