= Expo 2016 =

Horticultural exposition in Antalya, Turkey

EXPO 2016 Aksu, Antalya
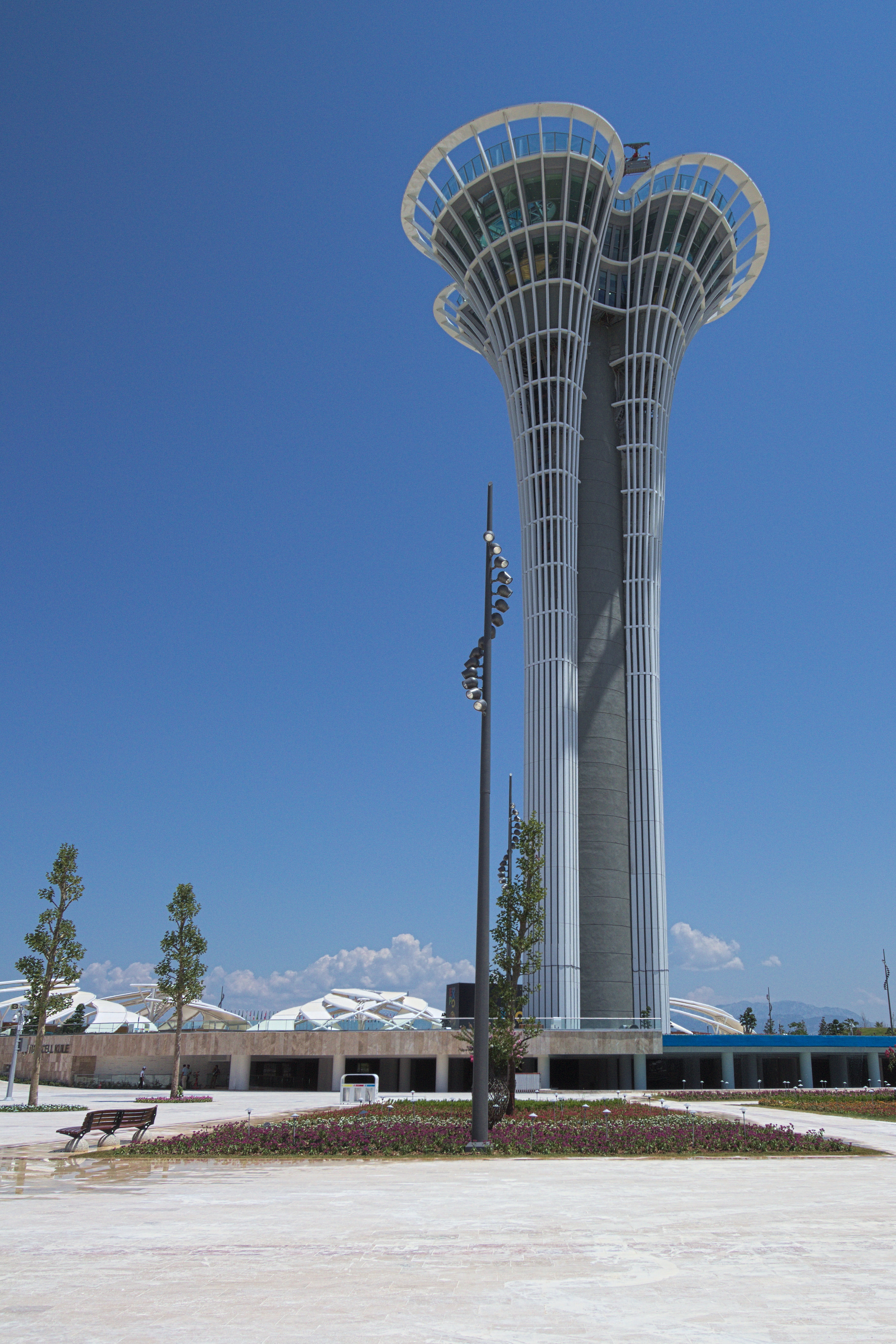
- Expo Turkcell Tower

Overview
- BIE-class: Horticultural exposition
- Name: Expo 2016
- Motto: "Gelecek Nesiller için Yeşil Bir Dünya" "A Green World for the Coming Generations"
- Area: 1,121 da (120,700 sq ft)
- Visitors: 4,500,000
- Organized by: Erdoğan Kök (commissioner general)
- Mascot: Two little Turkish children called "Ece" and "Efe"

Participant(s)
- Countries: 27

Location
- Country: Turkey
- City: Aksu, Antalya
- Coordinates: 36°56′51″N 30°53′05″E

Timeline
- Awarded: September 16, 2009
- Opening: April 23, 2016
- Closure: October 30, 2016

Horticultural expositions
- Previous: Expo 2012 in Venlo
- Next: Expo 2019 in Beijing

Specialized expositions
- Previous: Expo 2012 in Yeosu
- Next: Expo 2017 in Astana

Universal expositions
- Previous: Expo 2015 in Milan
- Next: Expo 2020 in Dubai

Internet
- Website: expo2016.org.tr (archive)

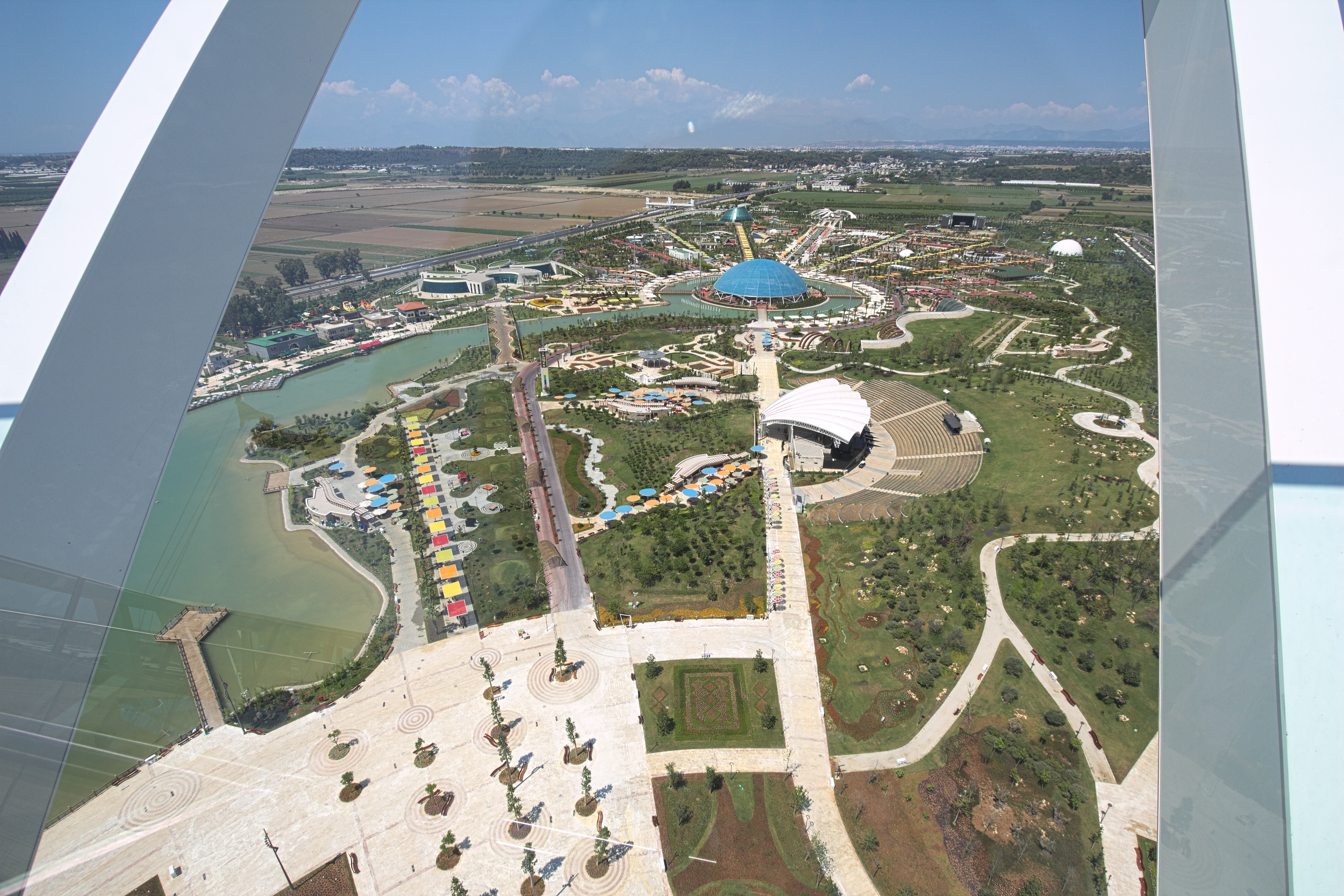
West view from Turkcell Expo Tower

Expo 2016 was an international horticultural exposition held in Antalya, Turkey. Under the aegis of the Bureau International des Expositions (BIE) Expo 2016 Antalya was the first International Horticultural Exhibition to be held in Turkey. (Note: Not to be confused with the Non-BIE-recognized Horticultural Expo held in Tangshan, China.)

As Turkey’s first International Horticultural Expo, Expo 2016 Antalya was held from April 22 to October 30, 2016. Starting with the philosophy of “Cultivating a Green Life for Future Generations”, EXPO 2016 Antalya has adopted the theme of “Flowers and Children” along with the motto “A Green Life for Future Generations” (Turkish: Gelecek Nesiller için Yeşil Bir Dünya). History, Bio-Diversity, Sustainability and Green Cities made up the four subthemes of EXPO 2016 Antalya.

Expo 2016 Antalya, which hosted national and international congresses, panels, meetings and seminars, also provided cultural and artistic activities for its guests. 8 million locals and foreign visitors visited EXPO 2016 Antalya over its 6-month duration. EXPO 2016 Antalya was held on a 112-hectare exhibit site in Aksu. EXPO 2016 Antalya aimed at being the start of a new way of thinking, the intoxicating scent of flowers and the laughter of children throughout the city bringing with it hopes for a greener world.

American singer-songwriter Demi Lovato performed at the exposition on October 1, 2016 as part of her Future Now Tour.

== Participating countries ==
In addition to the hosts Antalya Turkey, the following countries participated: Azerbaijan, Bangladesh, Benin, Bosnia and Herzegovina, Bulgaria, Burundi, Cameroon, Comoros, China, Democratic Republic of Congo, Eritrea, Ethiopia, Georgia, Germany, Ghana, Guinea, Hong Kong, Hungary, India, Italy, Japan, Kazakhstan, Kenya, South Korea, Kosovo, North Korea, Madagascar, Mauritania, Mexico, Moldova, Myanmar, Netherlands, Niger, Nepal, Pakistan, Palestine, Qatar, Congo, Senegal, Serbia, Sierra Leone, Somalia, South Africa, Sri Lanka, Sudan, Tanzania, Thailand, Turkmenistan, Uganda, Ukraine, United Kingdom, Yemen, Zimbabwe.

=== Pavilions ===
Germany Pavilion was represented by Martin Berlin, the Ambassador of Germany to Turkey.

Myanmar Pavilion was represented by Levi Sap Nei Thang.

The Deputy Commissioner-General of the Qatar Pavilion Fayqa Ashkanani and designed by Fatima Fawzi. The design was inspired by the Sidra tree.

== The Commissioner General of Expo 2016 ==
The Ambassador Erdoğan Kök was the commission general of Expo 2016 Antalya.

== Fairground ==
The fairground covered an area of 1,121 da (120,700 sq ft) in Aksu, Antalya. The cost of the investments made for the fair totalled to ₺ 1.7 billion (approximately US$ 600 million as of April 2016).

The facilities, which were built for the Expo 2016, were the Expo Tower, Turkey's first Agriculture and Biodiversity Museum, a congress center of 6,500 seating capacity, 5,000 and 800 seated two amphitheaters, a "Children Island" as playground and a "Science and Technology Center for Children". Further facilities were the Expo Pond, Expo Terrace in the form of peony, the symbol flower of the Expo 2016, Expo Hill, Expo Forest, Expo Square and "Culture and Arts Street" as well as restaurants.

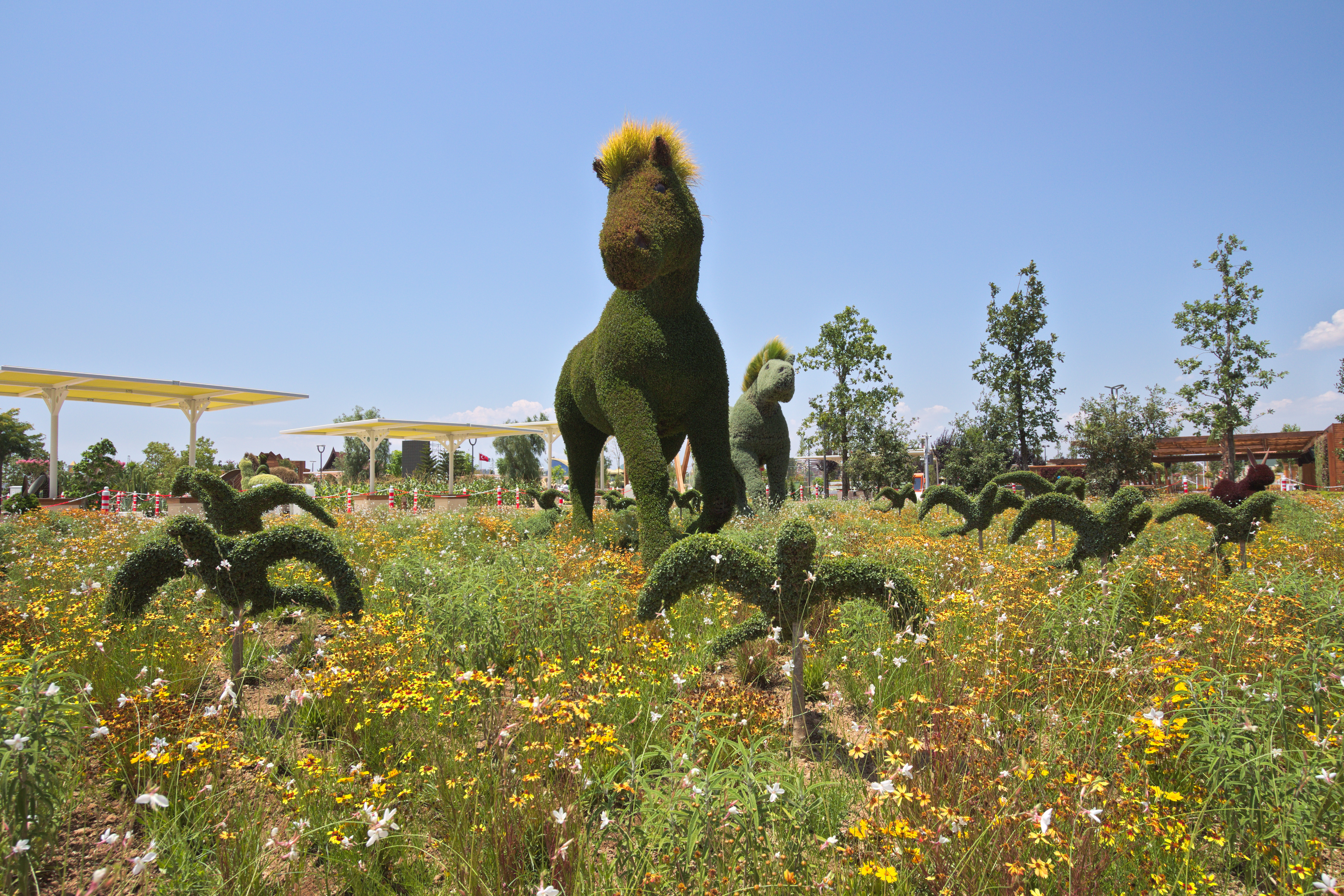
Garden Exhibition

Around 25,000 green plants of 120 species were planted in the fairground. The fair features also a 945-year old olive tree (Olea europaea).

Expo Tower

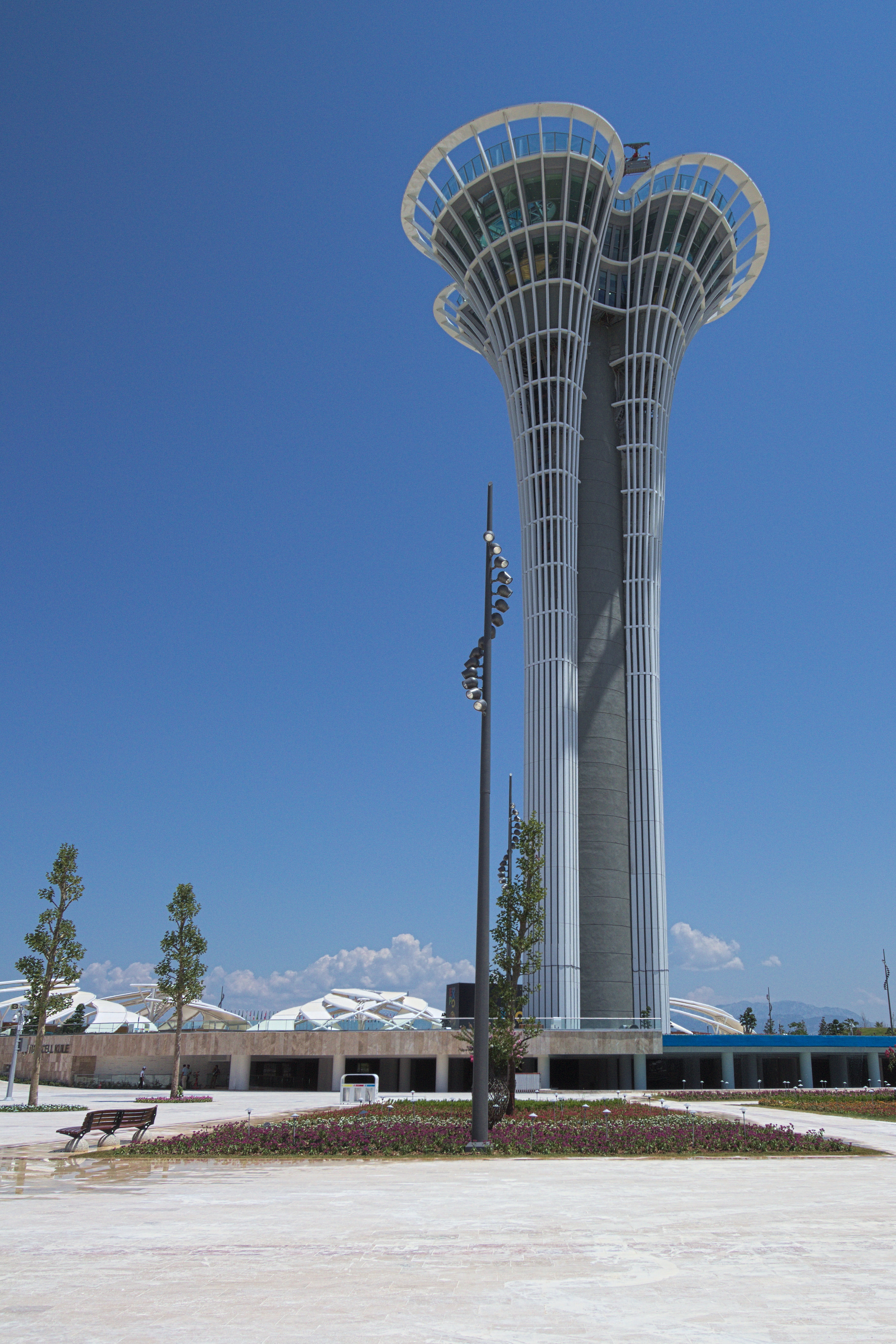
Expo Square in the foreground and Turkcell Expo Tower in the background.

The Expo Tower (Turkish: Expo Kulesi) was designed by architects Serdar Kızıltaş and Zeynep Melike Atay. It has the form of a three-leaved peony that resembles the three-arched Hadrian's Gate (Turkish: Üçkapılar, literally: "The Three Gates"), a landmark of Antalya.

The tower is a 100.70 m (330.4 ft)-high structure situated at the western side of the fairground facing the main entrance. It has a diameter of 10.40 m (34.1 ft) at the base. The exterior of the tower is covered 2/3 of its height by aluminium composite panel and the upper part by steel facia construction. It has two basement, one ground floor and 17 stories. Three elevators can lift up 63 visitors at the same time to the three-leaved peony-formed observation platform atop the tower.

== Access ==
The fairground was situated on the Antalya-Alanya state road northeast of Antalya, and 8 km (5.0 mi) northeast of Antalya Airport.

It was accessible by a light rail line, which was built as the extension of the existing public transportation system of Antalya. The 20.6 km (12.8 mi)-long line cost around ₺ 900 million (approx. US$ 318 million as of April 2016).
