= Walter Chit Tun =

Burmese body builder

- ဝေါ်လတာချစ်ထွန်း
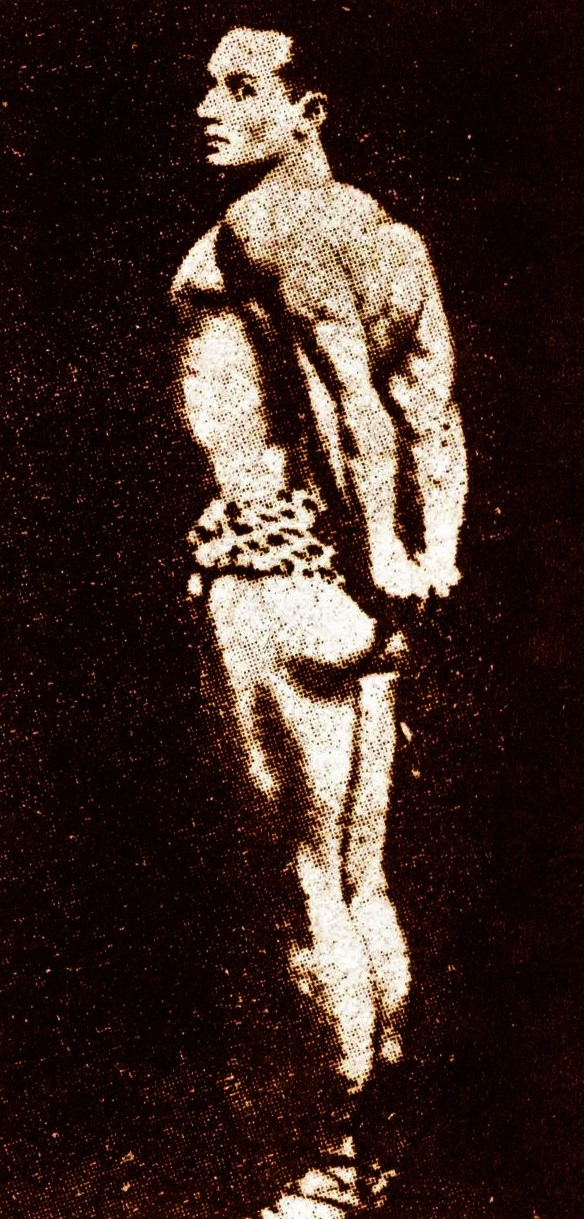
- Born: 1898; Moulmein, British Burma
- Died: 19 November 1947 (aged 48–49)
- Cause of death: Military Escort Accident
- Education: Doctor of Medicine (M.D.)
- Alma mater: Calcutta University
- Occupations: Medical Doctor and Bodybuilder
- Known for: Burma's first bodybuilder
- Spouse: Barbara Margaret King
- Children: Walter Chit Tun, II

Walter Chit Tun (Burmese: ဝေါ်လတာချစ်ထွန်း), Mon: ဝလ်တာ ချေတ်ထောန်) (1898 – 19 November 1947) was a pioneer of body building and weightlifting in Burma (now Myanmar). He was an ethnic Mon and born in Moulmein (present-day Mawlamyine) in British Burma to parents Dr Chit Tun and Daw Thein Ngwe in 1898. Walter Chit Tun shares the honor of being one of the first 18 Great Myanmars.

== Becoming bodybuilder ==
Walter Chit Tun studied at Rangoon's St. Paul Convent School and continued to Rangoon University. Because of the threats to his life due to his organizing students to stand up for the people's rights, he went on to India to study where he led a revival in the movement, Muscle Control, while also rallying the students of India to fight for their liberties. He influenced many leaders in India's physical culture. He wrote a document titled, Barbell Exercises, that combined the physical and mental condition of the ideal bodybuilder that became the tenets for Muscle Control. It became a phenomenon in India's physical culture.

== Life as medical doctor ==
Walter Chit Tun completed studying medicine in Calcutta University and went on to work at Rangoon Mental Hospital (Tadalay). There, he served as Superintendent of Tadalay Hospital. It was his dream to open a private hospital to assist those who were not being aided. However, he died before this dream was ever achieved.

== Life as movie star ==
Walter Chit Tun was one of the first Burmese movie stars. He appeared in the Burmese movie, Pan Bai Maung Tint Tai. However, Walter Chit Tun died in a motorcycle accident on 19 November 1947 after an interview for a Burmese publication. The accident involved military escorts.

He was survived by his wife, a British woman, Barbara Margaret King, and their children, including Walter Chit Tun, II. He is the grandfather of Joshua Chit Tun, a US based movie producer and philanthropist.
