= Sophar Rangoon =

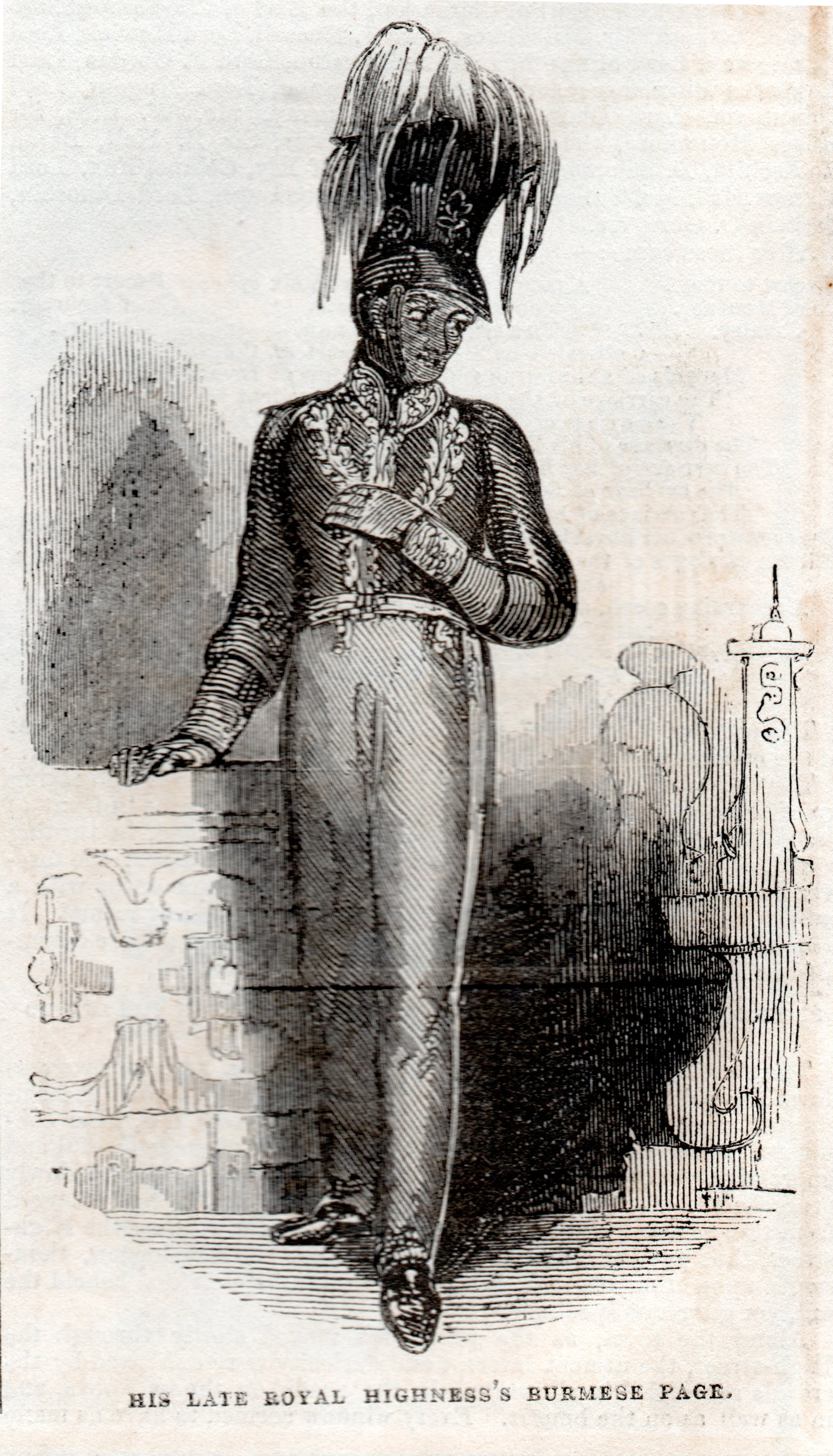
- Depiction of Sophar Rangoon at the Duke of Sussex's lying in, from the Illustrated London News, 6 May 1843
- Born: c. 1817; Burma
- Died: 22 January 1890 (aged 72); London, Surrey, UK
- Occupations: Page, Tailor
- Writing career
- Period: 19th century

Sophar Rangoon (c. 1817 – 22 January 1890) was the son of a Chief of the Kingdom of Ava (Burma). At around age eight Sophar was taken by Captain Frederick Marryat during the First Anglo-Burmese War c. 1824–1825. When Captain Marryat returned to England he gave Sophar as a gift to Prince Augustus Frederick, the Duke of Sussex.

"Soon after his return Captain Marryat lent his Burmese trophies and curios for an exhibition at the Royal Asiatic Society, the most spectacular exhibit being a golden statue of the King of Ava set with rubies... and he was as prodigial as the traditional sailor with his generosity in giving such valuable gifts to friends. The most unusual gift was that of an eight-year-old Burmese boy, whom he had brought home in his ship; said to be a chieftan's son, Sofar was presented to the King's brother and sixth son of King George III, the Duke of Sussex, as a page and was soon to be seen at Kensington Palace and Windsor Castle."

"It may be remembered that when the Duke of Sussex died a list of his possessions was published in the Illustrated News, amongst which was mentioned the portrait of a black boy in uniform. This boy had been brought to England by Captain Marryat, and presented to his royal patron, who had the boy educated and taught a trade."

The trade was tailoring.

Sophar lived in Kensington Palace at the same time as Queen Victoria who would have been a year or two younger than him, attending royal coronations, funerals and weddings including Queen Victoria's wedding in 1840 where Frederick the Duke of Sussex gave her away. Sophar remained in Kensington Palace in the Duke's service until the Duke's death in 1843 when Sophar would have been around age 27.

As one of the Duke of Sussex's senior pages, Sophar had a prominent position at his funeral.

"The funeral of the Duke of Sussex, though conducted in what was called a private manner, converted Kensington for three days into a place as bustling as London...

Thursday opened like a national holyday, with a spice of gravity suited to "the mournful occasion"; the full sense of which probably fell almost exclusively on those officially concerned... A slight lowering of the clouds early gave way to sunshine, vexation to radiant satisfaction. All London was out of town: Kensington became like Cheapside on the Lord Mayor's Day...

The distinguished persons who had been invited to attend the funeral began to arrive at Kensington Palace before seven o'clock in the morning... In front of the door were drawn up a detachment of the Royal Horse Guards, Blue, and a company of Foot Guards. The coffin was borne down the grand staircase by sixteen undertaker's assistants, and placed in the hearse. The procession began to be formed a little before eight o'clock; and it proceeded in the following order; the band of Dragoons playing at intervals The Dead March in Saul, and other solemn strains -

An Advanced Guard of the Royal Horse Guards, Blue.

Four of the Queen's Marshalmen, on foot, in scarlet uniforms.

Four Mutes in horseback, with silk scarfs and hatbands.

A mourning coach, drawn by four horses, caparisoned with black velvet and feathers; containing Messrs. Barnard and William Beckham, and Rangoon, three of his late Royal Highness's pages."

== Personal life ==
After the Duke's death Sophar moved to London, and within ten months he married a British woman, Margaret Sophia Green, whose family lived near the tailor shop where Sophar did his apprenticeship. Sophar named one of his sons Frederick Augustus after Augustus Frederick, the Duke of Sussex.

Sophar worked as a tailor in London until his death in 1890.

== Origins ==
Both Pocock's biography of Marryat and Sophar Rangoon's marriage certificate refer to Sophar as being the son of a chief, his marriage certificate specifying a Chief of the Kingdom of Ava. By the early 1800s Ava was no longer its own territory. In fact it had not been a territory since 1555. From the mid 15th century, Europeans used the term Ava to refer to central and northern Myanmar (Burma).

The branch of the family descended from Sophar's daughter Margaret were told they were descended from a prince. Most chiefs in Burma were princes, although a few were wealthy landowners, so this seems fairly likely. However princes were not necessarily royalty. Royal princes included the sons and brothers of the King. The other category of princes were individuals of non-royal lineage who were promoted to the rank of prince, and were divided into 3 ranks of 18 princes.

The branch of the family descended from Sophar's son Frederick have passed down the story that Sophar was rescued from a ship or boat by an Englishman. Two interesting facts come together at this point: 1) when their warships were boarded, the Burmese generally jumped overboard and 2) Burmese chiefs were known to go into battle with their children in tow as demonstrated by this account of Prince Tharawaddy's overthrow of his brother Bagyidaw:

"Prince Tharawaddy... crossed to the north bank of the Ayeyarwady by the Shwe Tone boat... with his children, maids and fully armed 700 men, marched to Yadana Theinga Myo and rebelled against his elder brother."

There is a newspaper report about an incident at the beginning of the war where HMS Liffey came up against a Burmese war boat, the British boarded and all the Burmese jumped in the water. They found a baby on board which they took and looked after on the ship. The captain said he intended to bring him back to England to be educated. Although HMS Liffey entered the war in Burma under the command of Commodore Grant, within a few weeks Grant was "indisposed" and departed Rangoon, leaving the ship under the command of Captain Marryat. So it would have been Marryat who took charge of the Burmese baby.

A baby would be too young to be Sophar although it's possible Sophar was also on the ship but, being older, was not as newsworthy. A Burmese toddler died on the ship that took Sophar to England which could have been the rescued baby as he would have been a toddler by this point.

Some online genealogies show Sophar as the son of Tharawaddy. It is possible that Sophar is a son of Tharawaddy, as he was commanding part of the war in Rangoon at the time and he was known to take his children into battle with him. Prince Tharrawaddy had 18 sons by various queens, many of which do not have the year of birth listed and simply say "died young". If Sophar and another child were left behind on a ship taken by the British and were never seen by their family again, it's possible their family would have thought they had died.

However, without knowing whose ship was boarded by HMS Liffey at the beginning of the war and whether Sophar was also found on board this ship along with the unnamed baby, it is impossible to determine Sophar's parentage at this point.
