= East Yangon General Hospital =

Hospital in Myanmar

Coordinates: 16°46′0″N 96°12′0″E

East Yangon General Hospital (East YGH)
- Department of Medical Services (DOMS), Ministry of Health and Sports (MOHS), Myanmar
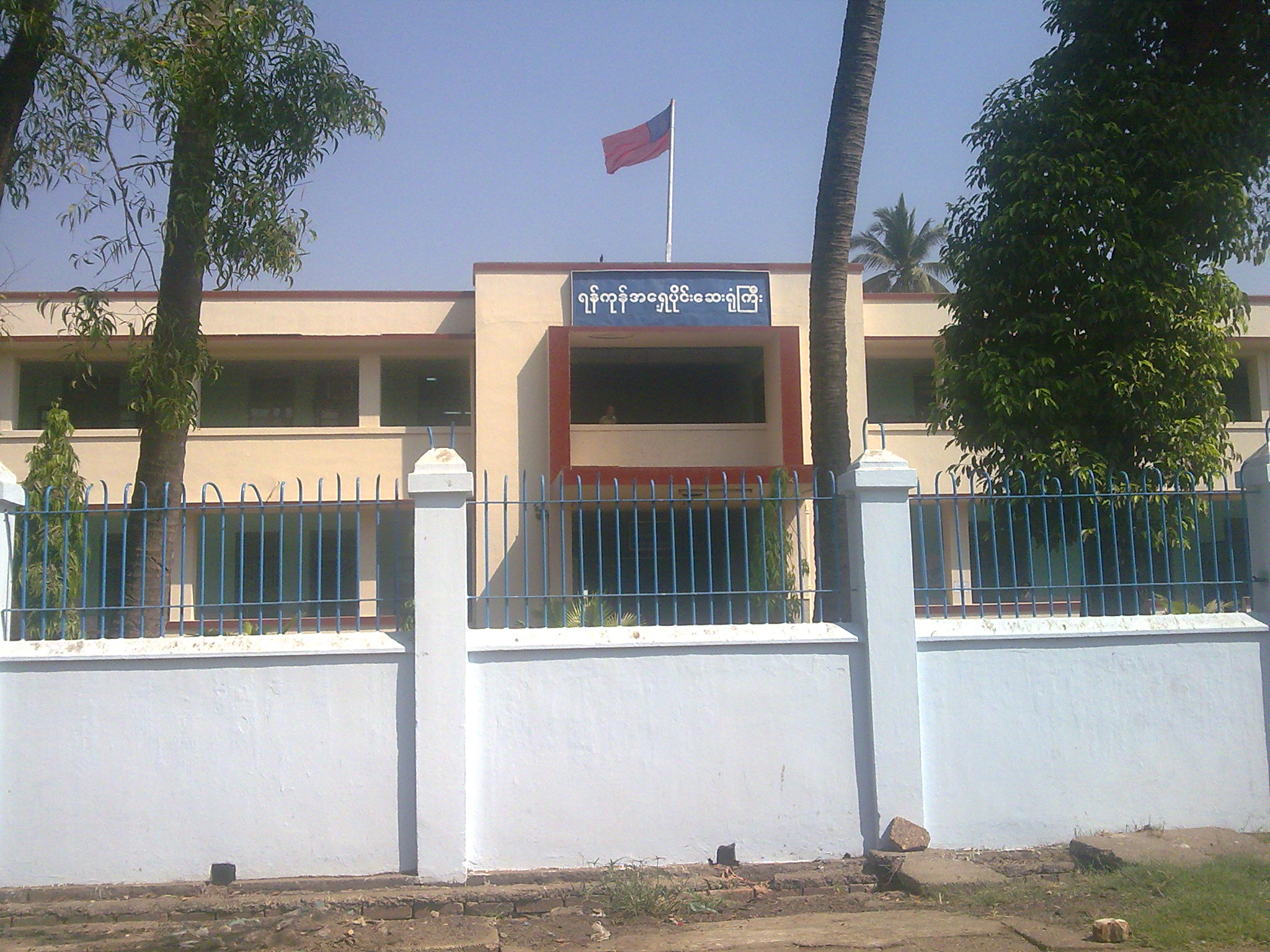

Geography
- Location: Botahtaung 11162, Yangon, Myanmar

Organisation
- Type: Teaching and Public Hospital
- Affiliated university: University of Medicine 1, Yangon

Services
- Emergency department: Yes
- Beds: 250

History
- Founded: 1950

Links
- Lists: Hospitals in Myanmar

The East Yangon General Hospital (Burmese: ရန်ကုန် အရှေ့ပိုင်း ဆေးရုံ) is a public general hospital located in Botataung township, Yangon, Myanmar. It consists of a medical ward, a surgical ward, a pediatrics ward, an obstetrics and gynecology ward, an eye ward, and an ENT ward. The hospital also runs an emergency department for general medicine, general surgery, O/G and traumatology. It is also the Tertiary Care Teaching Hospital for the University of Medicine 1, Yangon, the University of Nursing, Yangon, and the University of Paramedical Science, Yangon.

== See also ==
- List of hospitals in Yangon
