= West Yangon General Hospital =

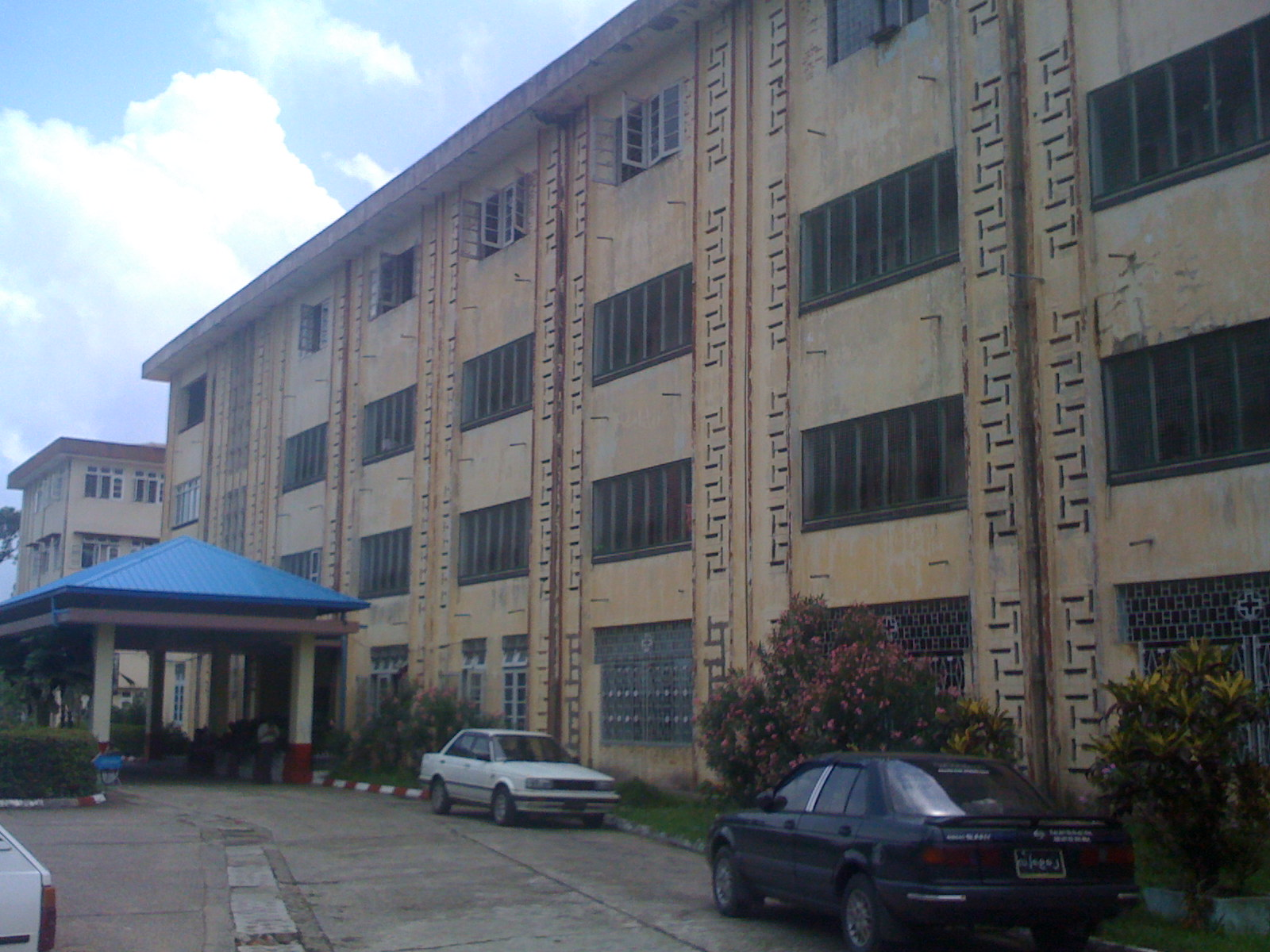

Geography
- Location: Kyimyindaing 11101, Yangon, Yangon Division, Myanmar
- Coordinates: 16.796126°N 96.125513°E

Organisation
- Type: Teaching
- Affiliated university: University of Medicine 1, Yangon

Services
- Emergency department: Yes
- Beds: 750

History
- Founded: 1950

Links
- Lists: Hospitals in Myanmar

The West Yangon General Hospital (Burmese: ရန်ကုန် အနောက်ပိုင်း ဆေးရုံ) is a public hospital in Yangon, Myanmar. It consists of a medical ward, a surgical ward, a pediatric ward, and an obstetrics and gynecology ward. The hospital also runs an ER for general medicine, general surgery and traumatology. It is also the Tertiary Care Teaching Hospital of the University of Medicine 1, Yangon, the Yangon Institute of Nursing, and the University of Paramedical Science, Yangon. The hospital mainly serves the masses who cannot afford treatment from private hospitals in Yangon or go abroad for "medical tourism".
