= Yangon (disambiguation) =

Yangon or Rangoon, is the former capital and largest city of Myanmar or Burma, located in Yangon Region.

Yangon may also refer to:

== Places ==
- Yangon Region, Myanmar; a division of Myanmar
- Yangon Central railway station, Yangon, Myanmar
- Yangon International Airport, Mingaladon, Myanmar
- Port of Yangon, Yangon, Myanmar
- Diocese of Yangon, Province of Myanmar, Anglican Church
- Roman Catholic Archdiocese of Yangon, Myanmar
- Yangon River, a river in Myanmar

== Groups, organizations ==
- Yangon City FM, Yangon, Myanmar; a radio station
- University of Yangon, Kamayut, Yangon, Myanmar
- Yangon Airways, an airline based in Yangon, Myanmar

== Other uses ==
- Crab Yangon, a dish, seafood puffs
- Miss Grand Yangon, Yangon Region, Myanmar; a beauty pageant
- Battle of Yangon (1824)

== See also ==
- Mayor of Yangon
- City Yangon F.C.
- Yangon United F.C.
- Yangon General Hospital, Yangon, Myanmar
- North Yangon District, Yangon Region, Myanmar
- South Yangon District, Yangon Region, Myanmar
- East Yangon (disambiguation)
- West Yangon (disambiguation)
- New Yangon (disambiguation)
- Rangoon (disambiguation)
