= New Yangon General Hospital =

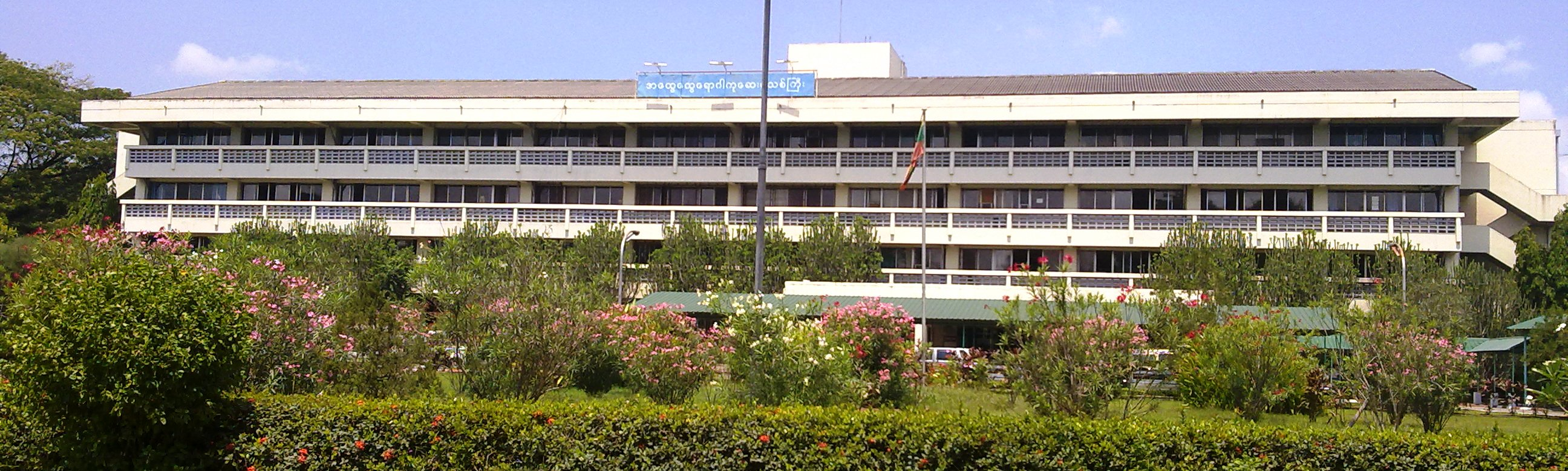

Geography
- Location: Lanmadaw Township, Yangon, Yangon Region, Myanmar
- Coordinates: 16°46′53″N 96°8′42″E

Organisation
- Type: Teaching
- Affiliated university: University of Medicine 1, Yangon

Services
- Emergency department: Yes
- Beds: 250

History
- Founded: 1984

Links
- Lists: Hospitals in Myanmar

The New Yangon General Hospital (Burmese: အထွေထွေရောဂါကု ဆေးရုံသစ်ကြီး (ရန်ကုန်)) is a public hospital in Yangon, Myanmar. It is also a teaching hospital of the University of Medicine 1, Yangon, University of Nursing, Yangon and the University of Medical Technology, Yangon. The hospital's construction was completed in 1984, using grant aid provided by the Japan International Cooperation Agency (JICA).
