= Wunna Theikdi Stadium =

Myanmar sporting venue

Coordinates: 19°46′0.0″N 96°4′21.9″E

- Interactive map of Wunna Theikdi Stadium
- Former names: Zabuthiri Stadium (2012-2013)
- Location: Zabuthiri Township, Naypyidaw, Myanmar
- Owner: Ministry of Sports and Youth Affairs
- Capacity: 30,000
- Surface: Grass

Construction
- Groundbreaking: 12 January 2010
- Opened: 2012
- Architect: Max Myanmar

Tenant
- Nay Pyi Taw F.C. (2012 - 2013)

Wunna Theikdi Stadium (Burmese: ဝဏ္ဏသိဒ္ဒိ အားကစားကွင်း) is a multi-use stadium in Naypyidaw, Myanmar. It can seat 30,000 spectators. The stadium hosted the 2013 Southeast Asian Games and the opening and closing ceremonies of the 2014 ASEAN Para Games. In addition, it hosted the events of 2015 National Sports Festival and 2018 ASEAN University Games. It hosts state and regional level sports competitions and has offices of Myanmar Olympic Committee and Department of Youth Affairs of Ministry of Sports and Youth Affairs.

== History ==
On 31 May 2010, Myanmar Olympic Committee was awarded the right to host the 27th SEA Games in 2013. The games are planned to be held mainly in the new capital, Naypyitaw. New infrastructure needed for the games were built in Zabuthiri Township and Zeyarthiri Township of Naypyitaw and Chanmyathazi Township of Mandalay.

Stadium

A large sports complex was built on 150 acres (61 ha) of land in Pyinyatheikdi Ward of Zabuthiri Township. The Sports Complex project include main stadium, indoor stadium, aquatic center, tennis court, futsal stadium, archery field and training grounds. Originally called Zambu Thiri Stadium, it was later renamed Wunna Theikdi Stadium. Similar to this stadium are Mandalarthiri Stadium in Mandalay and Zayarthiri Stadium in Zayarthiri Township. These stadiums are the first stadiums in Myanmar which were fully roofed.

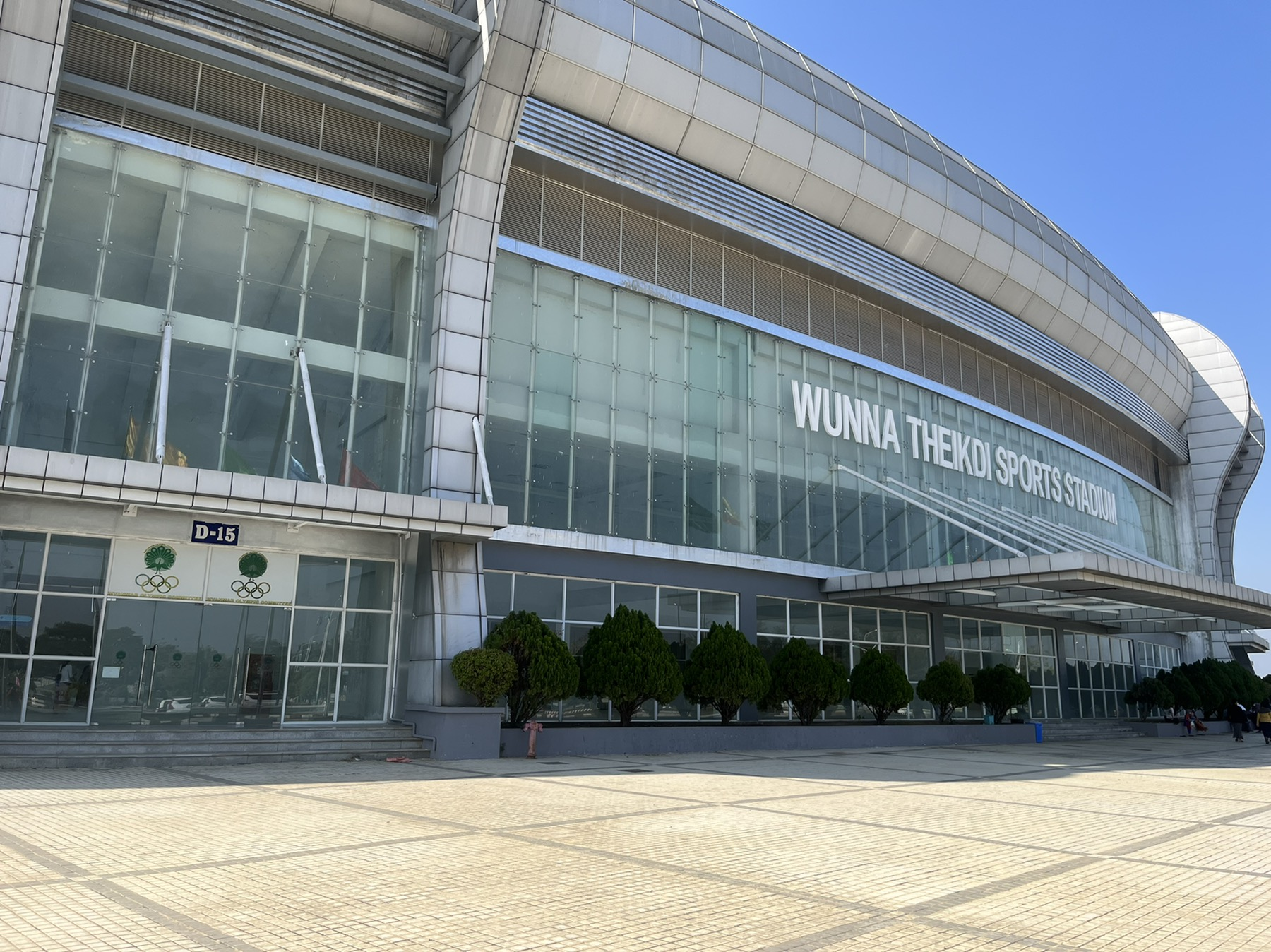
Office of Myanmar Olympic Committee

The stadium was built by Max Myanmar, owned by Zaw Zaw.

== Architecture and design ==
Wunna Theikdi Stadium is oval in shape, 263 m (863 ft) long, 231 m (758 ft) wide and 25 m (82 ft) high. The stands are in three stages. There is a runway between the lawn and the stands. Meeting rooms, Living rooms and (15) acres of parking space are also included.

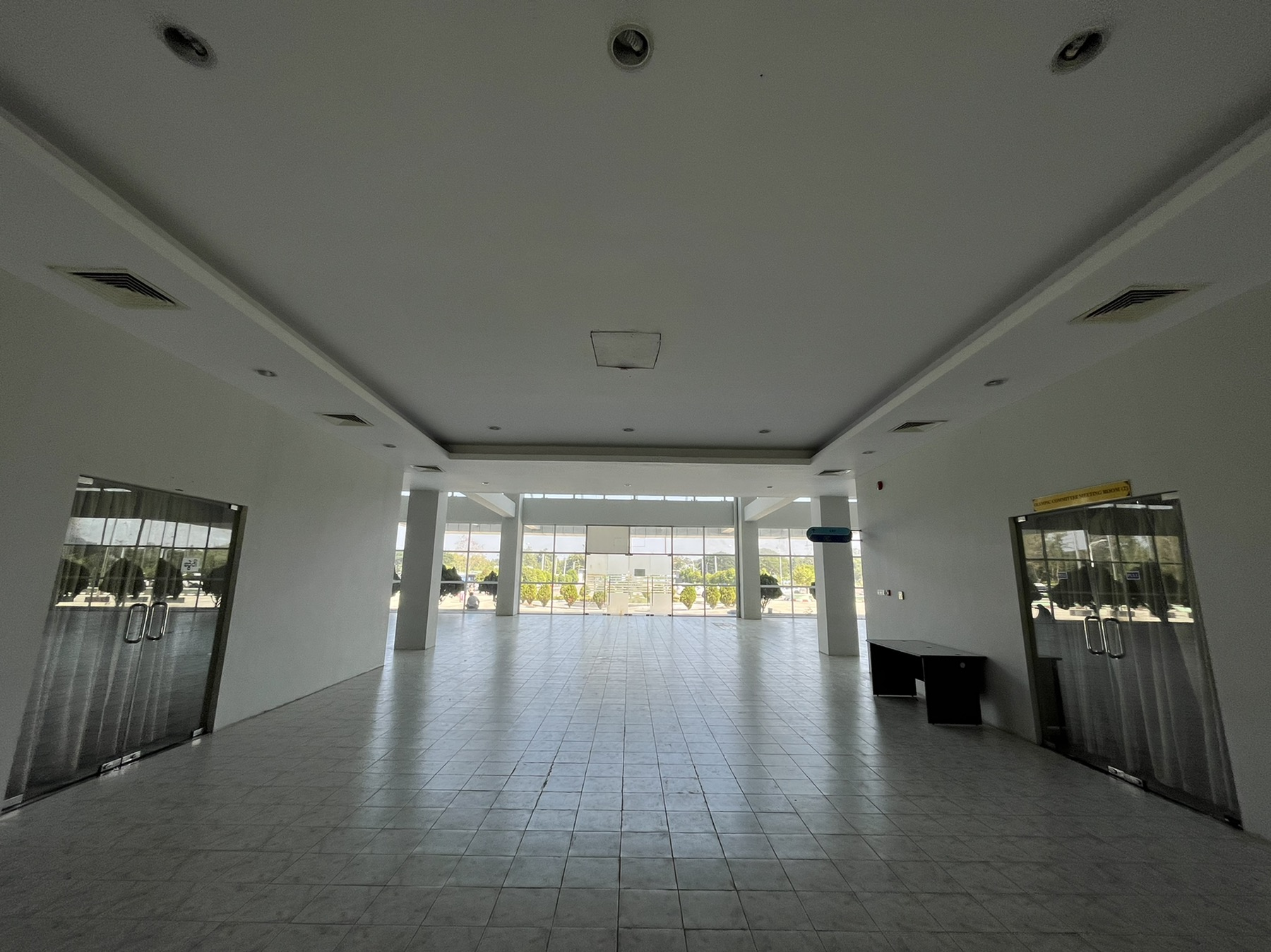
meeting rooms

lighting system

VIP Stand and Media Center

== 2013 Football violence ==
After the construction of the stadium, the match between Yangon United and Nay Pyi Taw Football Team was played on August 4, 2013, before the start of the 2013 Southeast Asian Games. During the match, players from both sides clashed. In addition, the host Nay Pyi Taw fans smashed the benches and came down to the field and attacked the referee and the opposing team players. This is one of the worst events in the history of the Myanmar National League. The violence destroyed more than 150 seats at the new stadium.

field

== Prominent events ==
=== 2013 SEA Games and 2014 ASEAN Para Games ===
The stadium hosted the opening and closing ceremonies of 27th SEA Games and 7th ASEAN Para Games. It also hosted the athletic events of the games.

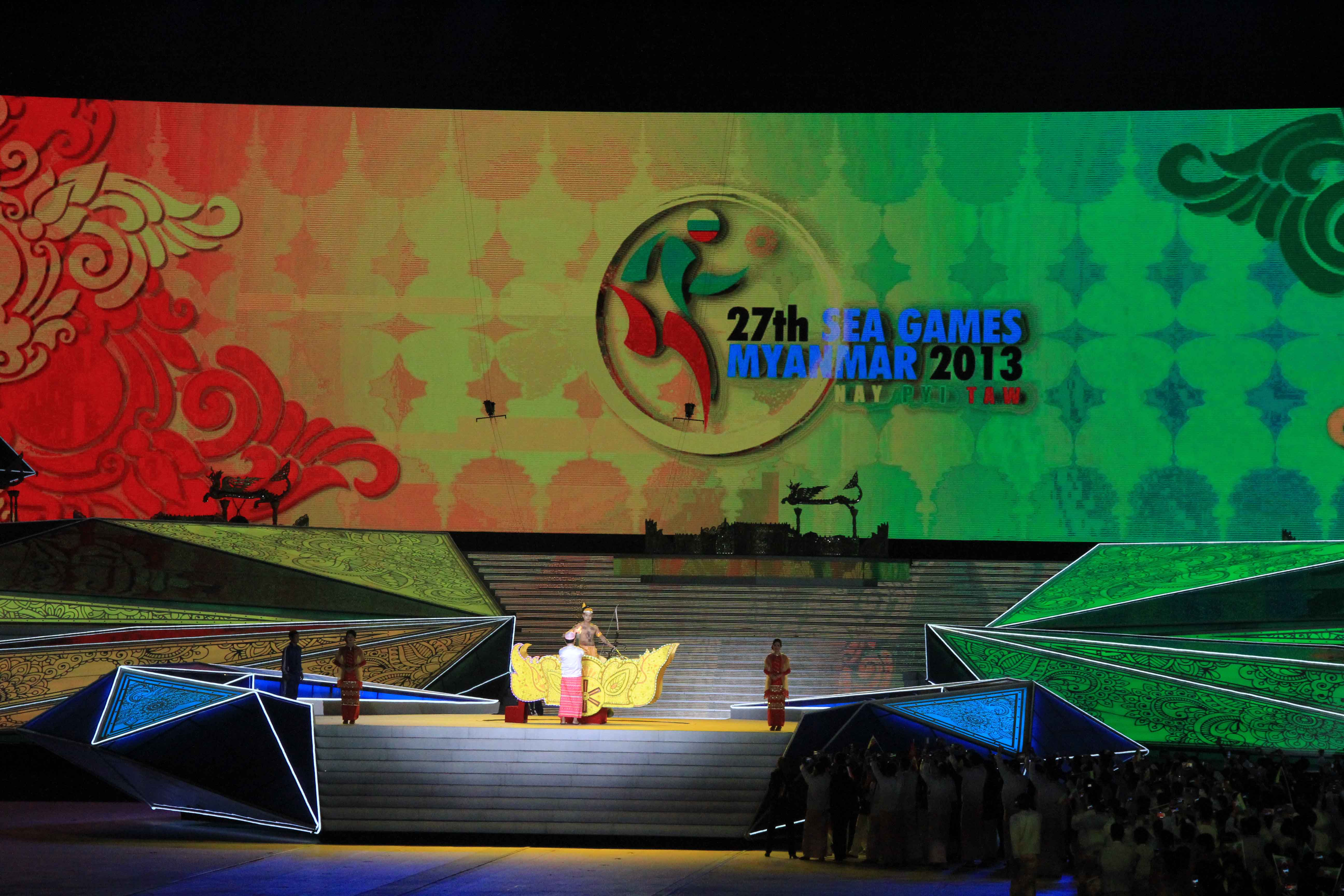
opening ceremony of 27th SEA Games

=== 2015 NSF ===
The stadium hosted the 2015 National Sports Festival's football matches and closing ceremony.

=== 19th AUG ===
The stadium hosted the football matches of 19th ASEAN University Games in 2018.
