= 2018 ASEAN University Games =

Sports event in Naypyidaw, Myanmar

XIX ASEAN University Games
- Host city: Naypyidaw, Myanmar
- Motto: Youth and Friendship; Burmese: လူငယ်နှင့်ချစ်ကြည်ရေး
- Athletes: 2078
- Events: 203 in 17 sports
- Opening: December 10, 2018
- Closing: December 19, 2018
- Opened by: Myint Swe; Vice-President of Myanmar
- Athlete's Oath: Sandi Oo
- Torch lighter: Wai Lin Aung
- Main venue: Wunna Theikdi Indoor Stadium (B)
- Website: 2018 ASEAN University Games

The 2018 ASEAN University Games, officially known as the 19th ASEAN University Games, was a Southeast Asian university multi-sports event held in Myanmar from 8 December 2018 to 19 December 2018. This was the first time Myanmar had hosted the ASEAN University Games.

== Preparation and development ==
The Ministry of Education and the Ministry of Health and Sports organized the 19th AUG Organization Committee, led by patron vice president Myint Swe, chairman Myo Thein Gyi, vice chairman Myint Htwe and other ten working committees. They selected the athletes from all of the universities and trained them.

=== Venues ===
The 19th ASEAN University Games has 13 venues for the games. The athlete's village is in Zabuthiri Township with two Cluster, Myitkyina Cluster and Monywa Cluster.

Competition Venue	Sports
Wunna Theikdi Indoor Stadium (B)	Opening and closing ceremony
Wunna Theikdi Aquatic Center	Swimming
Wunnatheikdi Archery Field	Archery
Wunna Theikdi Petanque Sports Village Complex	Petanque
Wunna Theikdi Stadium	Athletics/ Football
Wunna Theikdi Stadium Football Training Field (3)	Football
Wunna Theikdi Sports Complex Indoor Stadium - A	Badminton, Basketball
Wunna Theikdi Sports Complex Indoor Stadium - C	Wushu, Karate-do, Tennis, Vovinam
Wunna Theikdi Futsal Indoor Stadium	Separktakraw, Chinlone
Wunna Theikdi Indoor Stadium - B	Volleyball
Wunna Theikdi Boxing Indoor Stadium	Table Tennis
City Golf Club	Golf
Ngalike Dam	Rowing
Billiard & Snooker Indoor Stadium	Chess

Wunnatheikdi Indoor Stadium

Host city

== Marketing ==
=== Motto ===
The official motto for the games is Youth and Friendship, which was chosen to represent the sportsmanship that the athletes should follow. Youth is representative of being alert, agile and energetic, while also referring to young students from ASEAN universities who will be the future of the community. While Friendship, represents the bonds that The Games aims to form among South East Asian youth, alongside the goal to strengthen understanding and cooperation among ASEAN countries and cultures, thereby promoting peace across the region.

=== Logo ===
The emblem or logo of the 19th ASEAN University Games is designed to include a coloured pattern used in the National Flag of Myanmar. The yellow represents belief, serenity and wisdom. The golden beams shining from the yellow sun are symbolic of 11 ASEAN countries. The green is used to depict peace, harmony and unity. This colour also symbolizes a range of mountains covered with plants and trees. The red is representative of courage, bravery and loyalty. It also symbolizes the current situation of Myanmar moving steadily towards being a federal democratic country. The white star, depicted as an athlete doing warm-up exercises, is used as a symbol of a sport competition. The Parliament Complex, symbolic of the Capital of Myanmar, implies that the 19th ASEAN University Games will be held in Nay Pyi Taw.

=== Mascot ===
The official mascot for the games is the Ayeyarwady Dolphin. It was chosen for its presence in three rivers of Southeast Asian nations: the Ayeyarwady River (Myanmar), the Mahakam River (Indonesian Borneo), and the Mekong River. The species is regarded as intelligent and is associated in Myanmar with helping fishermen catch fish, as well as with attracting ecotourism. According to the organizers, the choice of mascot was intended to reflect qualities such as youthfulness, intelligence, and helpfulness. The Irrawaddy dolphin population has declined significantly and is considered endangered, and its selection as mascot has also been linked to conservation awareness efforts.

Official Mascot of 19th AUG

== The Games ==
=== Opening ceremony ===
The opening ceremony was held in the Wunnatheikdi Indoor Stadium on 10 December. Some Myanmar artists sang songs before the ceremony. The Vice-President of Myanmar Myint Swe arrived at 5 p.m..When he was arrived the ceremony was started with countdown. Then, the officials and athletes from the 11 participating countries marched into the stadium. The Myanmar national flag, AUSC flag and 19th AUG-Myanmar flag were hoisted. The patron of the 19th AUG Organising Committee, Vice President U Myint Swe declared the opening of the games.

The students from the National University of Arts and Culture - Yangon and Mandalay presented the four Myanmar Cultural performances and one ASEAN performance. The ceremony was concluded at about 7 p.m.

=== Sports ===
There were 17 sports for these games.

- Archery (10)
- Athletics (36)
- Badminton (7)
- Basketball (2)
- Chess (4)
- Football (1)
- Golf (4)
- Karate (15)
- Petanque (7)
- Rowing (16)
- Sepak takraw (4)
- Chinlone (4)
- Swimming (38)
- Table tennis (5)
- Tennis (7)
- Volleyball (2)
- Vovinam
- Wushu

=== Calendar ===
OC	Opening ceremony	●	Event competition	1	Gold medal events	CC	Closing ceremony

December	8th Sat	9th Sun	10th Mon	11th Tue	12th Wed	13th Thu	14th Fri	15th Sat	16th Sun	17th Mon	18th Tue	19th Wed	Events
Ceremonies			OC									CC	—N/a
Archery						●	●	2	2	6			10
Athletics						10	10	11	7				38
Badminton		●	●	2	●	●	5						7
Basketball						●	●	●	●	●	2		2
Chess					●	●	●	●	●	●	4		4
Chinlone	1	1	1	1									4
Football		●	●		●		●		●		1		1
Golf						●	●	●	4				4
Karate									6	7	2		15
Petanque							●	4	●	2	2		8
Rowing						3	1	6	6				16
Sepak takraw					●	●	1	1	●	1	1		4
Swimming				8	8	8	7	7					38
Table tennis							3	●	2	●	2		7
Tennis		●	●	●	3	●	4						7
Volleyball		●	●	●	●	●	2						2
Vovinam									3	6	5		14
Wushu		3	5	9	5								22
Daily medal events	1	4	6	20	16	21	33	31	30	22	19	0	203
Cumulative total	1	5	11	31	47	68	101	132	162	184	203	203	203
December	8th Sat	9th Sun	10th Mon	11th Tue	12th Wed	13th Thu	14th Fri	15th Sat	16th Sun	17th Mon	18th Tue	19th Wed	Total events

=== Medal table ===
* Host nation (Myanmar)

Rank	Nation	Gold	Silver	Bronze	Total
1	Thailand (THA)	62	52	38	152
2	Indonesia (INA)	44	39	30	113
3	Malaysia (MAS)	37	43	49	129
4	Myanmar (MYA)*	24	26	29	79
5	Vietnam (VIE)	16	9	6	31
6	Laos (LAO)	7	9	11	27
7	Singapore (SIN)	5	12	18	35
8	Cambodia (CAM)	5	10	12	27
9	Timor-Leste (TLS)	2	0	0	2
10	Philippines (PHI)	1	0	0	1
11	Brunei (BRU)	0	0	0	0
Totals (11 entries)		203	200	193	596

Preceded by Singapore	ASEAN University Games; Naypyidaw; XIX ASEAN University Games (2018)	Succeeded by Ubon Ratchathani 2020
