= Thuwunna Stadium =

Stadium in Yangon, Myanmar

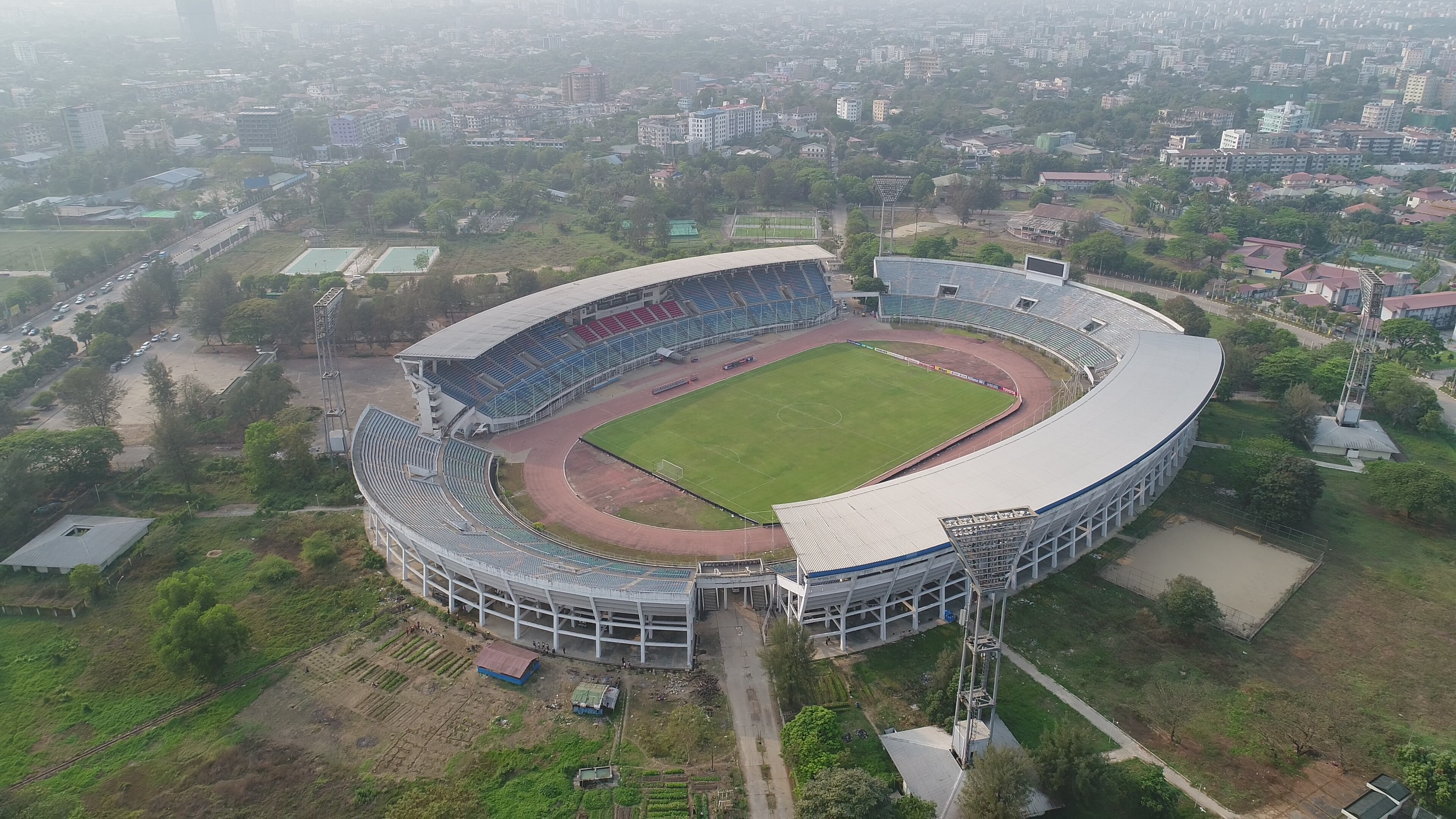
- Aerial view of the stadium
- Interactive map of Thuwunna Stadium
- Location: Thingangyun 11072, Yangon, Myanmar
- Coordinates: 16°49′16.73″N 96°11′12.58″E
- Owner: Ministry of Sports and Youth Affairs
- Capacity: 50,000
- Surface: Grass

Construction
- Opened: 1985

Tenants
- Myanmar national football team (1985–present); Yangon United; Shan United (sometimes)

The Thuwunna Youth Training Center Stadium (Burmese: သုဝဏ္ဏ လူငယ် လေ့ကျင့်ရေး ကွင်း), simply known as the Thuwunna Stadium, is a multi-purpose stadium located in Yangon, Myanmar. It is the venue of choice for most national and international football and track and field competitions. The stadium has a capacity of 50,000. The stadium's eight-lane running track is the first in Myanmar that conforms the IAAF standards.

== History ==
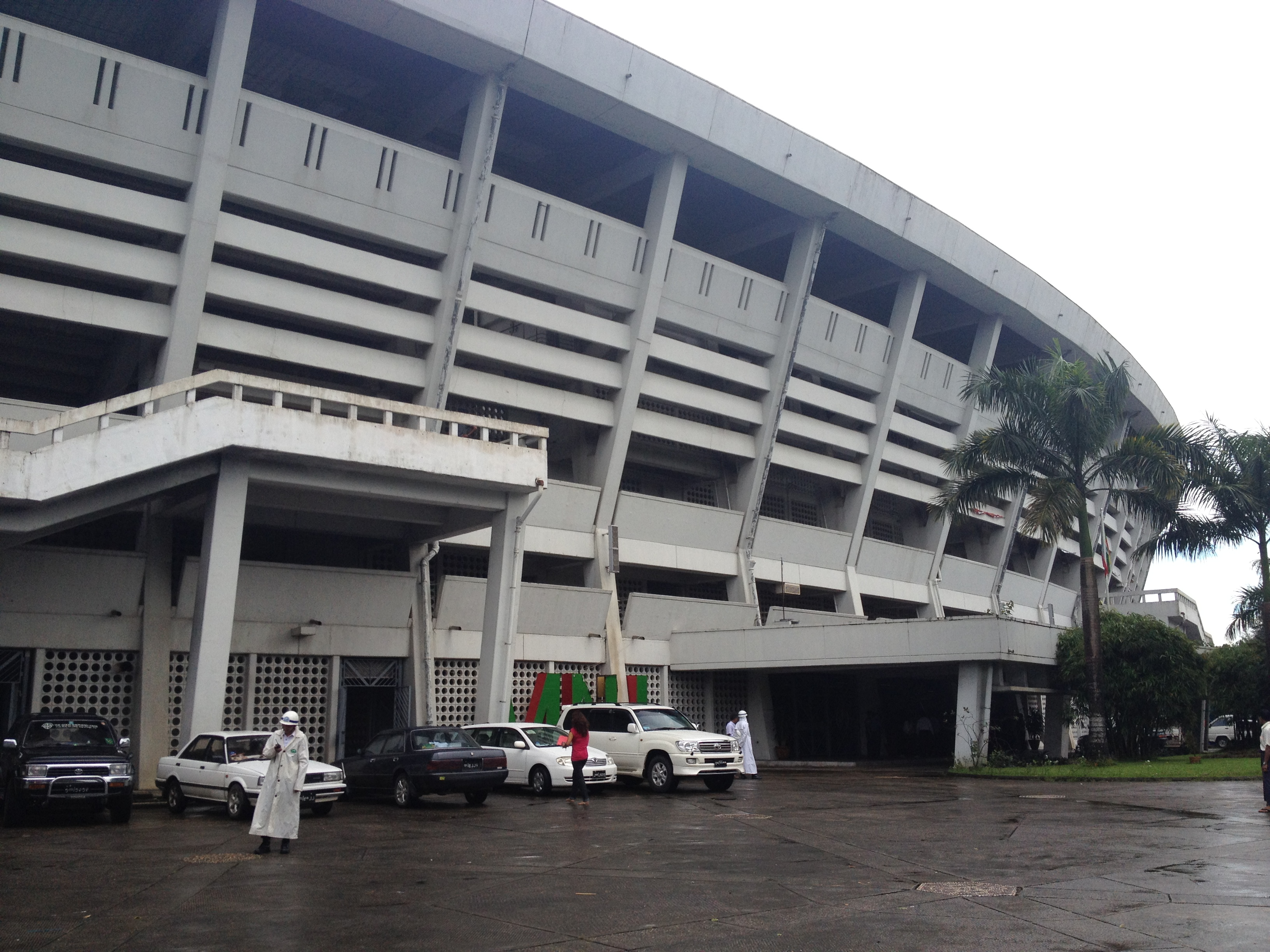
The stadium's VIP entrance

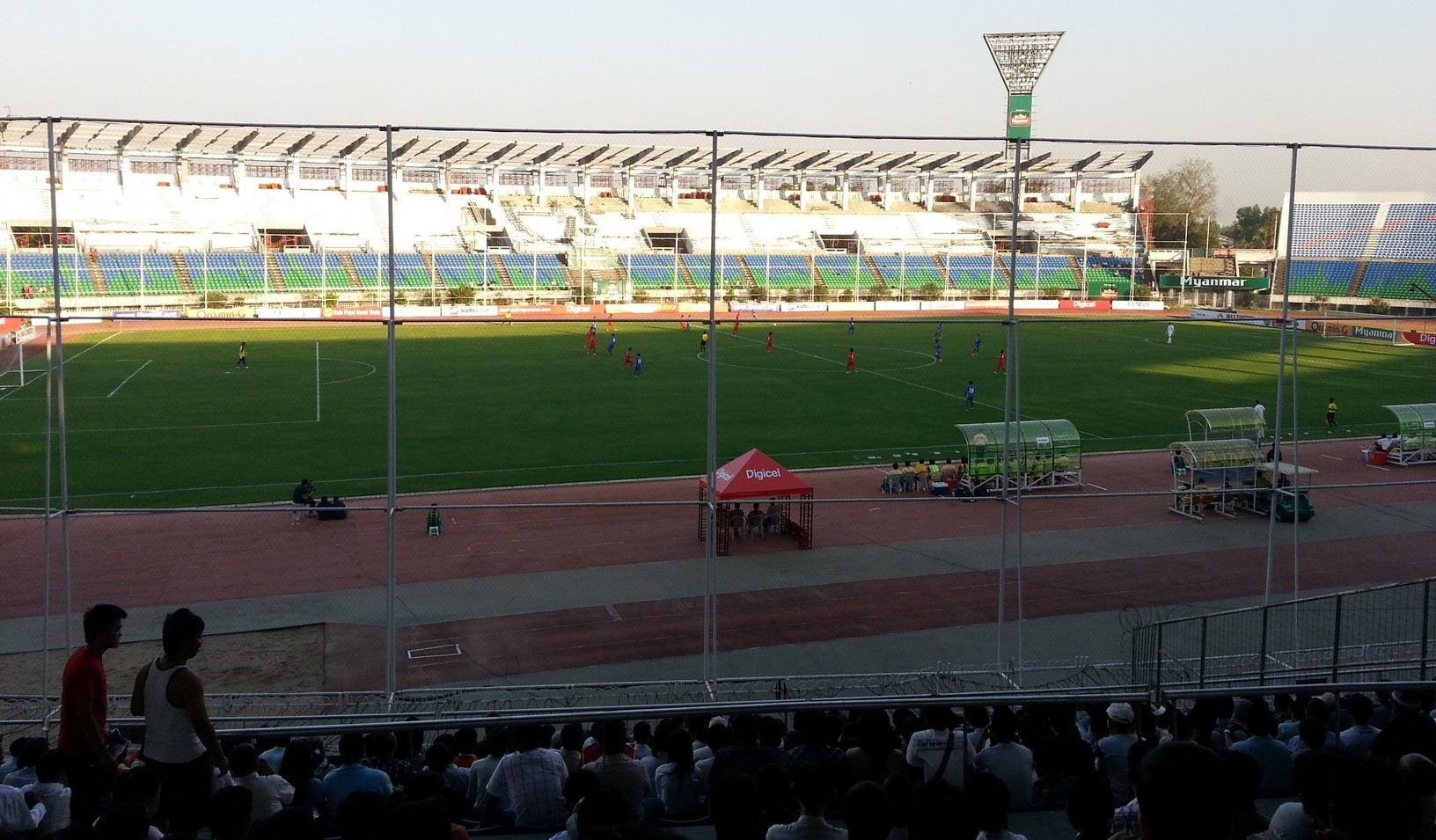
The east stand under renovation in February 2013

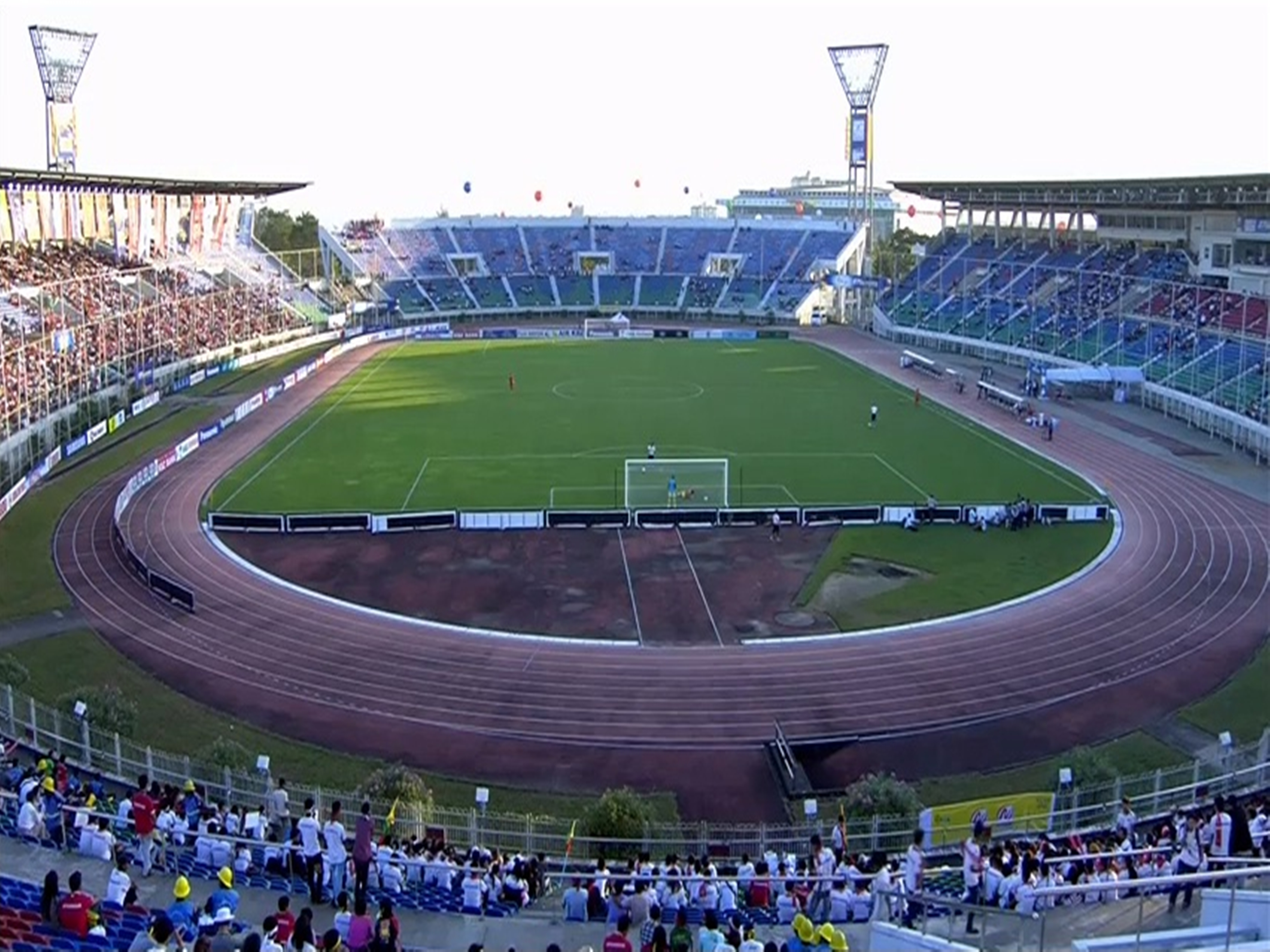
The stadium in December 2013

Constructed with help from the Japanese government, the stadium was completed in 1985.

From 23 June to 3 July 2012, the stadium hosted 2013 AFC U-22 Asian Cup qualification Group G matches.

The stadium underwent a major renovation and was expanded to host football matches of the 2013 Southeast Asian Games. It also hosted the qualification stage of the 2012 AFF Championship and matches in Group B of the main tournament in 2016.
