= Tint Hsan =

Burmese politician and businessman

- တင့်ဆန်း

Union Minister of Sports
- In office 30 March 2011 – 30 March 2016
- Preceded by: Aye Myint
- Succeeded by: Myint Htwe (minister of MOHS)

Minister for Hotels and Tourism
- In office 30 March 2011 – 27 August 2012
- Succeeded by: Htay Aung

Pyithu Hluttaw MP
- In office 31 January 2011 – 30 March 2011
- Preceded by: Constituency established
- Succeeded by: Mahn Johnny
- Constituency: Myaungmya Township
- Majority: 67,569

Personal details
- Born: 14 September 1956 (age 69) Burma
- Party: Union Solidarity and Development Party (USDP)
- Children: Phyo Ko Ko Tint San
- Occupation: Businessman

Tint Hsan (Burmese: တင့်ဆန်း, also spelt Tint San; born 14 September 1956) was the Minister for Sports from 2011 to 2016. He owns A.C.E. Group of Companies, a major Burmese construction company.

== Career ==
=== MP ===
In the 2010 general election, Tint Hsan was elected as MP for Pyithu Hluttaw from Myaung Mya Township of Ayeyarwady Region.

=== Union Minister ===
On 30 March 2011, he was appointed as Union Minister for the Ministry of Sports and the Ministry of Hotels and Tourism. He was in charge of two ministries. In August 2012, he only handled Sports. Minister for Hotels and Tourism was replaced by Htay Aung.

He took over the flag of SEAGF in the closing ceremony of the 2011 SEA Games in Indonesia. His biggest achievement as the minister of Sports was hosting the SEA Games. He served as the chairman of the Organization Committee for the 27th SEA Games and the 7th ASEAN Para Games.

== Personal life ==
On 15 October 2017, Phyo Ko Ko Tint San (b. 1976), Tint Hsan's son, who serves as the chairman of A.C.E. Group, was arrested for possession of narcotics (methamphetamines and crystal meth) and multiple firearms and ammunition at Nay Pyi Taw International Airport. Additional raids at the ACE Hotel in Naypyidaw, his homes in Naypyidaw and Yangon, and the Yangon ACE Group offices yielded additional ammunition and pistols. In 2017, Tint Hsan's younger son, San Ko Ko Tint San, co-founded 7th Sense Creation, a major film studio in Myanmar.
