= Min Thein Zan =

Thiri Pyanchi Min Thein Zan
- မင်းသိန်းဇံ

Union Minister for Sports and Youth Affairs
- Incumbent
- Assumed office 1 August 2021
- Deputy: Myo Hlaing; Dr Soe Win (2022–2023); Zin Min Htet
- Prime Minister: Min Aung Hlaing
- Preceded by: Dr Thet Khaing Win (as MOHS)

Chairman of Myanmar Olympic Committee
- Incumbent
- Assumed office 1 August 2021
- Preceded by: Dr Thet Khaing Win

Myanmar Ambassador to Sri Lanka
- In office October 2013 – 2018
- President: Thein Sein; Htin Kyaw; Win Myint
- Preceded by: Myo Lwin
- Succeeded by: Han Thu

Myanmar Ambassador to Maldives

Personal details
- Education: Defence Services Academy
- Awards: Thiri Pyanchi

Military service
- Allegiance: MYA
- Branch/service: Myanmar Army
- Rank: Brigadier General

Min Thein Zan (Burmese: မင်းသိန်းဇံ) is the current Union Minister for Sports and Youth Affairs of Myanmar. He retired with the rank of Brigadier General from the Tatmadaw and was also appointed as the Myanmar Ambassador to Sri Lanka and the Maldives.

== Career ==
Min Thein Zan graduated from the 23rd intake of the Defence Services Academy. After serving in the Tatmadaw for about 35 years, he was transferred from the Ministry of Defense to the Ministry of Foreign Affairs on May 14, 2013. Then he became Myanmar's ambassador to Sri Lanka. On August 5, 2014, he was appointed as the joint ambassador to Maldives.

=== Union Minister ===
On 1 August 2021, the management committee of SAC was organized as caretaker government and they reconstituted the Ministry of Health and Sports as the Ministry of Health and the Ministry of Sports and Youth Affairs. Min Thein Zan was appointed as the Union Minister.

== Personal life ==
Min Thein Zan's wife, Daw May Than Kyaing, is a retired professor from Yangon University. They were childhood friends and were married in the 1980s. They have three sons.
