= Htay Aung =

Politician and military of Myanmar

- ဌေးအောင်

Minister of Hotels and Tourism
- In office September 2012 – 30 March 2016
- Deputy: Tin Shwe and Kyaw Ohn
- Preceded by: Tint Hsan
- Succeeded by: Ohn Maung

Deputy Minister of Hotels and Tourism
- In office March 2011 – September 2012

Personal details
- Education: George Washington University Mae Fah Luang University

Military service
- Rank: Captain

Htay Aung (Burmese: ဌေးအောင်) is a former military officer and politician, who previously served as Minister of Hotels and Tourism in Myanmar. He was appointed in September 2012 by President Thein Sein, effectively receiving a promotion, as he had previously been a deputy minister at the ministry from March 2011 to September 2012.

He received a MSc degree in Hotels and Tourism Management from George Washington University, US in 1991 and a PhD degree in Literal Arts from Mae Fah Luang University, Thailand in 2016.
