= Wunna Theikdi Indoor Stadium =

Indoor stadium in Myanmar

Wunna Theikdi Indoor Stadium ဝဏ္ဏသိဒ္ဓိ မိုးလုံလေလုံအားကစားရုံ
- Stadium in 2013
- Interactive map of Wunna Theikdi Indoor Stadium ဝဏ္ဏသိဒ္ဓိ မိုးလုံလေလုံအားကစားရုံ
- Location: Naypyidaw
- Coordinates: 19°46′28″N 96°4′11″E
- Owner: Ministry of Sports and Youth Affairs
- Operator: Department of Sports and Physical Education
- Capacity: Stadium (A) -3000; Stadium (B) -5000; Stadium (C) -3000

Construction
- Built: 8 February 2011
- Opened: 2013

Wunnatheikdi Indoor Stadium (Burmese: ဝဏ္ဏသိဒ္ဓိ မိုးလုံလေလုံအားကစားရုံ) is an indoor stadium located inside Zabuthiri Sports Complex in Naypyidaw. It is composed of Stadium (A), Stadium (B) and Stadium (C). Stadium (A) and (C) have a capacity of 3,000 and Stadium (B) has a capacity of 5,000.

It was built for the 2013 Southeast Asian Games. Construction began in 2011 and opened in 2013. Currently, national level sports festivals are being held in this stadium. It also hosted the 19th AUG in 2018 and was used as the main stadium.

== Gallery ==
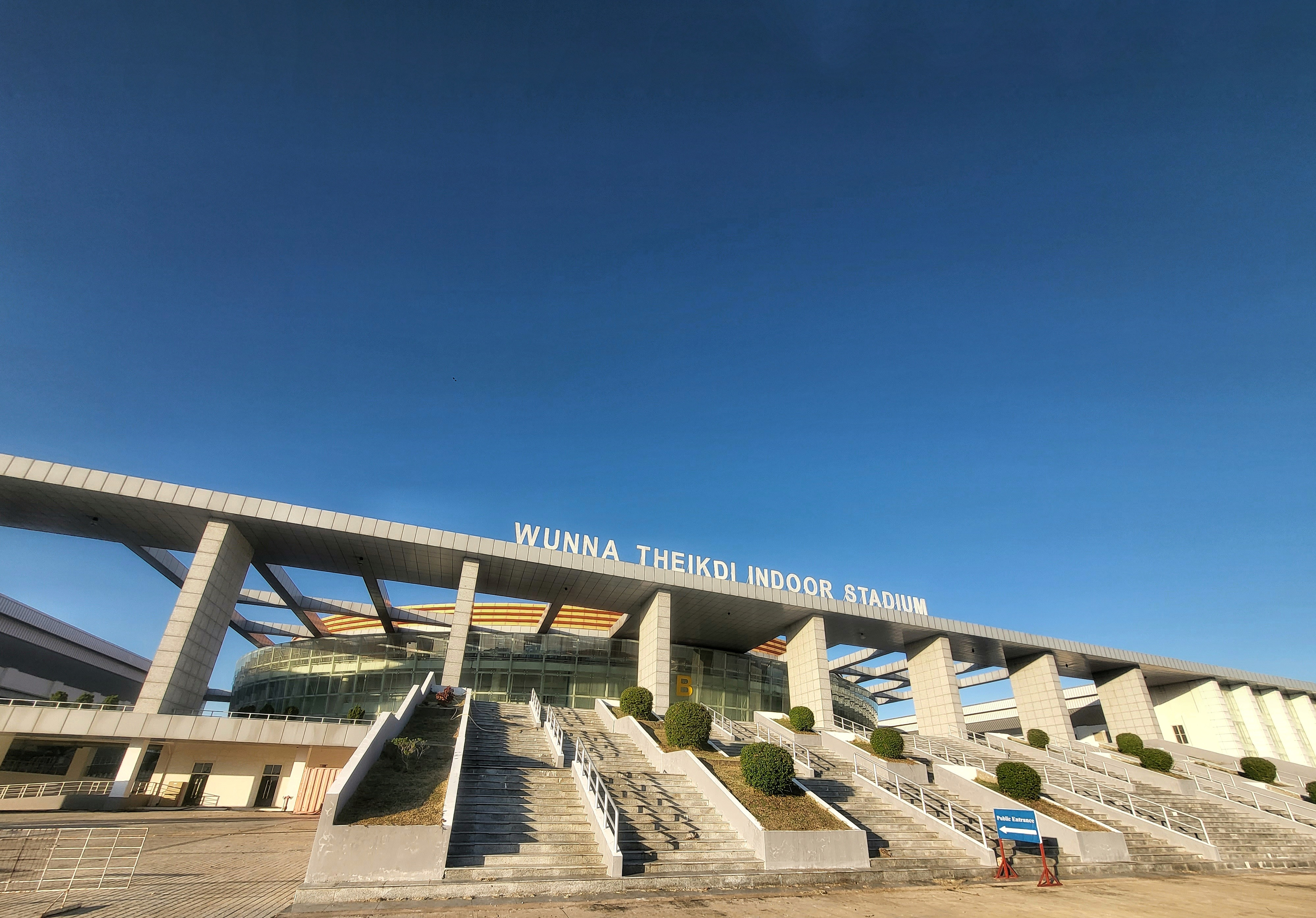
Stadium in 2022

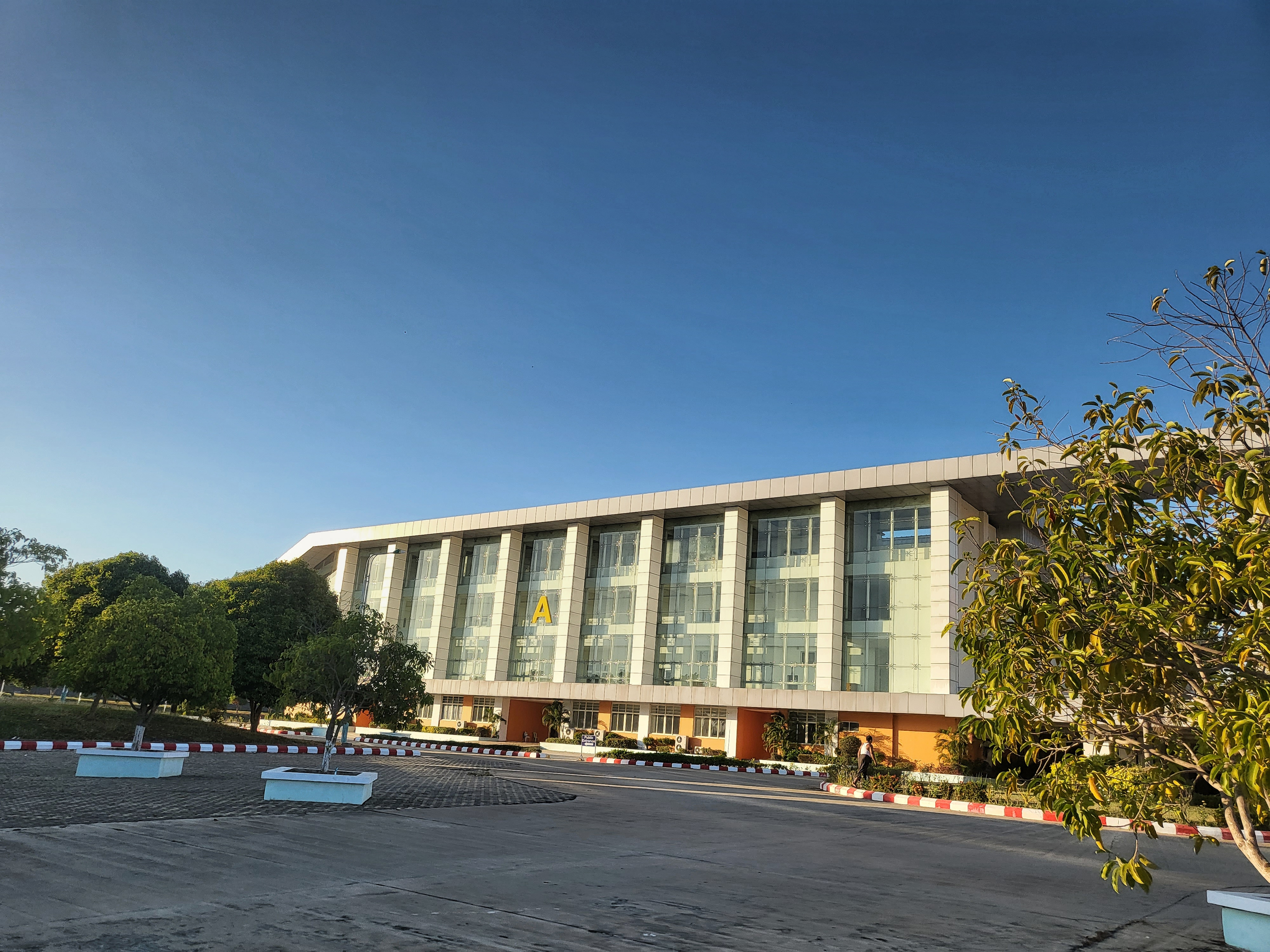
Stadium (A)

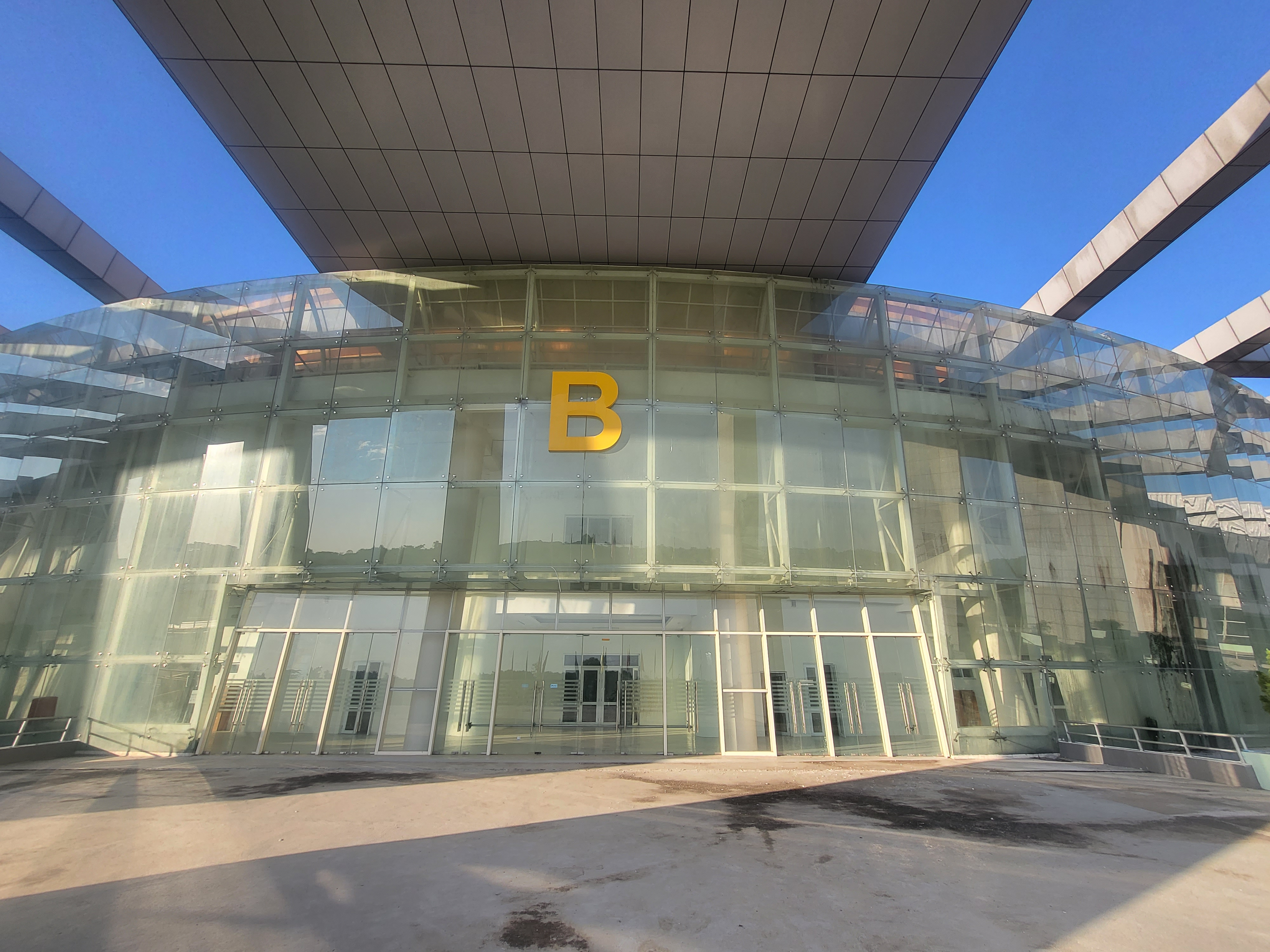
Stadium (B)

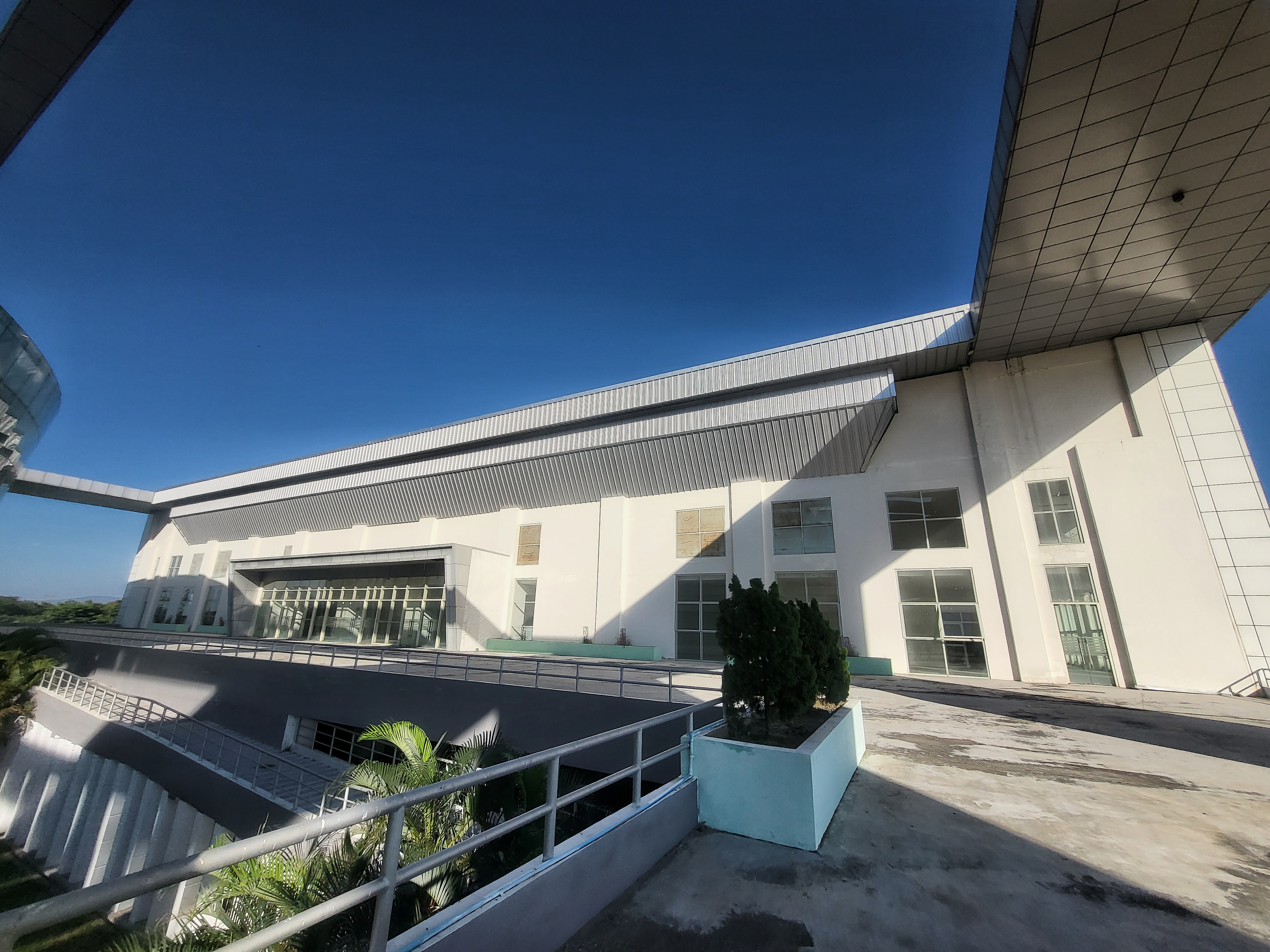
Stadium (C)

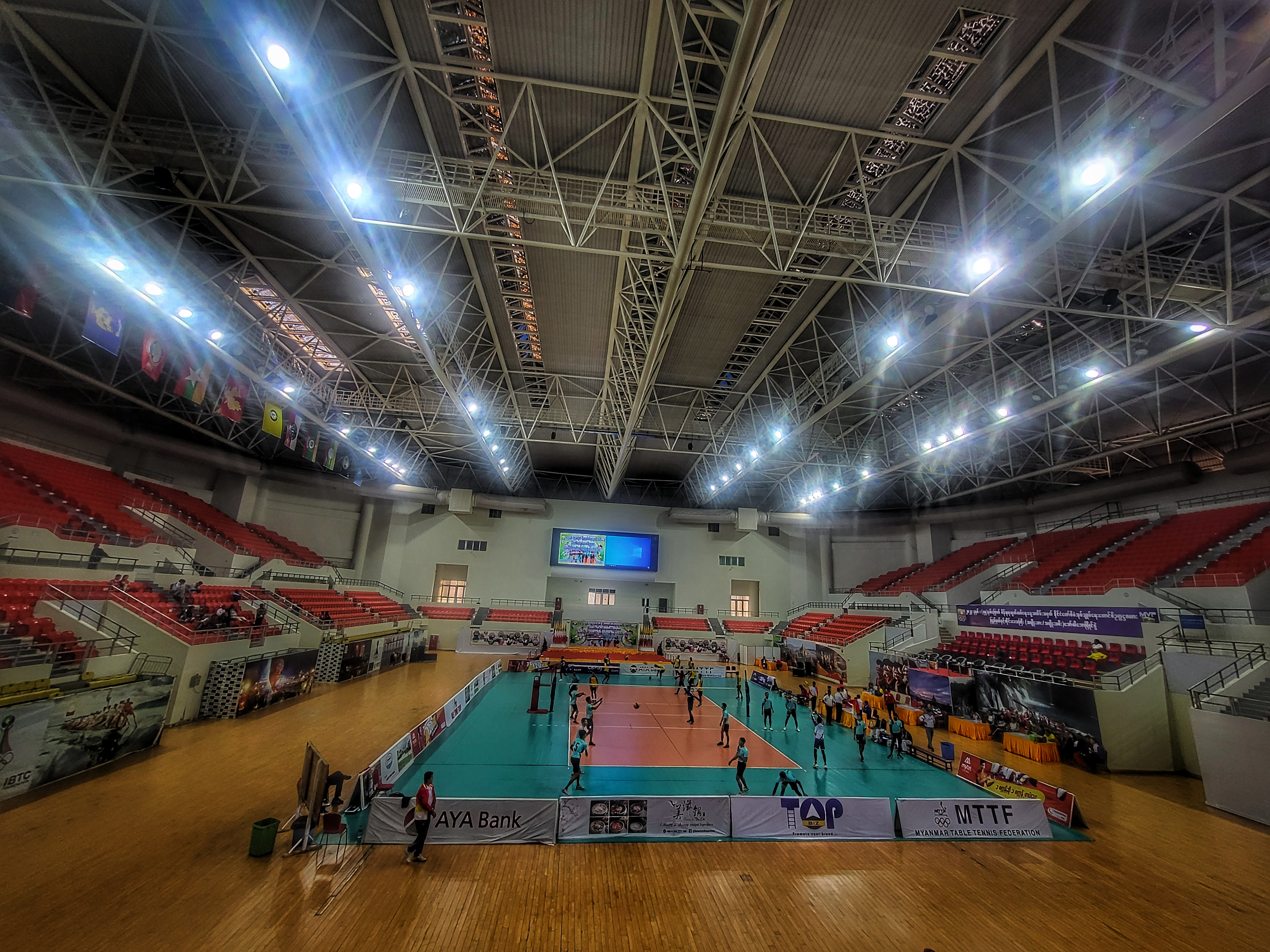
Inside the stadium (B)
