= Ministry of Sports (Myanmar) =

Government ministry of Myanmar

- အားကစားရေးရာ ဝန်ကြီးဌာန

Agency overview
- Formed: 18 December 1996; 29 years ago (Sports); 10 April 2026; 7 months ago
- Preceding agency: Ministry of Sports and Youth Affairs
- Type: Ministry
- Jurisdiction: Union Government of Myanmar
- Headquarters: Office No (31), Naypyidaw
- Minister responsible: Ye Myint Tun, Union Minister
- Deputy Minister responsible: Nyi Nyi, Deputy Minister
- Child agency: Department of Sports and Physical Education
- Website: mosya.gov.mm

The Ministry of Sports (Burmese: အားကစားရေးရာ ဝန်ကြီးဌာန; MOS), also to referred to as the Ministry of Sports Affairs or the Ministry of Sport Affairs, is a government ministry that administers sports in Myanmar. The ministry was formed in 1996 as Ministry of Sports and organized as Ministry of Health and Sports in 2016. In 2021, following the formation of a military cabinet of the post-coup government, the ministry was reorganized as Ministry of Sports and Youth Affairs. On 10 April 2026, the Ministry of Sports and Youth Affairs was split into Ministry of Sports and Ministry of Youth Affairs.

The current union minister is Ye Myint Tun.

The Department of Sports and Physical Education is under the Ministry of Sports. Other affiliations include the Myanmar National Olympic Council, National Olympic Committee, and Sports Federations. The Union Minister must be the chairman of the National Olympic Committee. The Ministry is also responsible for stadiums in Myanmar.

== History ==
On 27 May 1964, the "Burma Sports and Physical Education Committee" was organized. The health minister served as chairman and the director general for SPEC Office served as secretary. In 1972, it was organized as "Department of Sports and Physical Education" (DSPE) under the Ministry of Health. On 1 July 1993, it moved under the Ministry of Prime Minister Office.

On 18 December 1996, the government established the "Ministry of Sports" for the country's sports affairs. The DSPE was moved from Ministry of Prime Minister Office to the Ministry of Sports. From 1996 to 2011, SPDC appointed brigadier generals from the Tatmadaw as Minister of Sports. On March 30, 2011, newly elected president Thein Sein appointed Tint Hsan, a businessman, as Union Minister for Sports.

When Htin Kyaw became the president in March 2016, he reduced the number of ministries in his cabinet. He dissolved the Ministry of Sports and moved the Department of Sports and Physical Education to the Ministry of Health. But on 25 May 2016, the Ministry of Health was renamed as the Ministry of Health and Sports. Prior to 2018, only the Director General of DSPE took the lead in sports sector. In 2018, former badminton player, Mya Lay Sein, was appointed as deputy minister by Win Myint and acted more effectively on behalf of the Union Minister.

After the 2021 coup d'état, Myint Htwe resigned from his post and Mya Lay Sein was suspended by Min Aung Hlaing. They were replaced by Thet Khaing Win, former permanent Secretary of MOHS under Myint Htwe, and Myo Hlaing, former Director General of DSPE. On 1 August 2021, the Management Committee of SAC was organized as a caretaker government and they reconstituted the Ministry of Health and Sports as the Ministry of Health and the Ministry of Sports and Youth Affairs.

On April 10th, 2026, the Ministry of Sports and Youth Affairs was split into the Ministry of Sports and the Ministry of Youth Affairs.
