= Wunna Theikdi Aquatic Center =

Sports venue in Myanmar

Wunna Theikdi Aquatics Center ဝဏ္ဏသိဒ္ဓိ ရေကူးကန်
- Interactive map of Wunna Theikdi Aquatics Center ဝဏ္ဏသိဒ္ဓိ ရေကူးကန်
- Location: Naypyidaw
- Coordinates: 19°46′27″N 96°4′24″E
- Owner: Ministry of Sports and Youth Affairs
- Operator: Department of Sports and Phyaical Education
- Capacity: 3000

Construction
- Built: August 2011
- Opened: August 2013

Wunna Theikdi Aquatic Center is an aquatic center located inside Wunna Theikdi Sports Complex in Naypyidaw.It was built to host the 27th SEA Games. Construction began in 2011 and completed in 2013. It features one swimming pool (50 meter), diving pool and outdoor pool. It can accommodate around 3,000 spectators. The only international standard indoor swimming pools in Myanmar is this one and the Zeyar Thiri Aquatic Center from the military-owned Zeyar Thiri Sports Complex.
