= 2015 Myanmar National Sports Festival =

National sports competition in Myanmar

4th National Sports Festival
- Host city: Naypyidaw
- Country: Myanmar
- Teams: 15
- Events: 34
- Opening: February 21, 2015
- Closing: February 28, 2015
- Opened by: Nyan Tun (Vice President)
- Main venue: Wunna Theikdi Indoor Stadium

The 2015 Myanmar National Sports Festival, officially known as 4th National Sports Festival (Burmese: စတုတ္ထအကြိမ် အမျိုးသားအားကစားပွဲတော်) was the sport competition of 1 union territory, 7 regions and 7 states. It was the first time in 18 years that the festival was held, after the 3rd National Sports Festival in Yangon in 1997.

The festival was held to produce new generations for all kinds of sports and to prepare for the 28th SEA Games.

The 1st, 2nd and 3rd National Sports Festivals were held in 1992, 1994 and 1997 in Yangon. The festival could not be held after 1997 because of the difficulty of organising the events. From 2015, the government was said to be trying to hold the sports festival annually.
