= Ministry of Health and Sports (Myanmar) =

Government ministry in Myanmar

- ကျန်းမာရေးနှင့်အားကစားဝန်ကြီးဌာန

Government overview
- Formed: 25 May 2016
- Preceding agencies: Ministry of Health (Myanmar); Ministry of Sports (Myanmar)
- Dissolved: 1 August 2021
- Jurisdiction: Government of Myanmar
- Headquarters: Office No (4), Naypyidaw, Myanmar
- Minister responsible: Dr Thet Khaing Win
- Government executives: Myo Hlaing, Deputy Minister; Dr Aye Tun, Deputy Minister
- Website: www.mohs.gov.mm

Ministry of Health and Sports was a government ministry in Myanmar responsible for handling health affairs such as disease prevention and medical research and to promote sports and physical education across the country. It was regrouped to Ministry of Health and Ministry of Sports. In 2016, President Htin Kyaw dissolved the Ministry of Sports and organized it under the Ministry of Health. On 25 May 2016, under Htin Kyaw's Government, it was renamed to Ministry of Health and Sports, regrouping both ministries in one governing body.

On 1 August 2021, the SAC reconstituted the Ministry of Health and Sports as Ministry of Health and Ministry of Sports and Youth Affairs.

== Departments ==
- Department of Public Health
- Department of Medical Services
- Department of Human Resources for Health
- Department of Medical Research
- Department of Traditional Medicine
- Department of Food and Drug Administration
- Department of Sports and Physical Education

== See also ==
- Ministry of Health
- Ministry of Sports
