= Ministry of Sports and Youth Affairs (Myanmar) =

Government ministry of Myanmar

- အားကစားနှင့် လူငယ်ရေးရာ ဝန်ကြီးဌာန

Agency overview
- Formed: 18 December 1996; 29 years ago (Sports); 1 August 2021; 5 years ago (Sports and Youth)
- Dissolved: April 10, 2026
- Superseding agencies: Ministry of Sport Affairs; Ministry of Youth Affairs
- Type: Ministry
- Jurisdiction: Government of Burma
- Headquarters: Office No (31), Naypyidaw
- Minister responsible: Min Thein Zan
- Deputy Minister responsible: Myo Hlaing (Sports); Zin Min Htet (Youth Affairs)
- Child agencies: Department of Sports and Physical Education; Department of Youth Affairs
- Website: mosya.gov.mm

The Ministry of Sports and Youth Affairs (Burmese: အားကစားနှင့် လူငယ်ရေးရာ ဝန်ကြီးဌာန; MOSYA) was a Myanmar government ministry that administered Myanmar sports and youth affairs. The ministry was formed in 1996 as Ministry of Sports and organized as Ministry of Health and Sports in 2016. In 2021, following the formation of a post-coup military government, the ministry was reorganized as Ministry of Sports and Youth Affairs. The last union minister before its dissolution was Min Thein Zan, appointed by SAC Chairman Min Aung Hlaing. The Ministry of Sports and Youth Affairs was split into the Ministry of Sports Affairs and Ministry of Youth Affairs in 2026, after the conclusion of the 2025-26 Myanmar general elections.

The Department of Sports and Physical Education, the Department of Youth Affairs and their branches are under the Ministry of Sports and Youth Affairs. Other affiliations include the Myanmar National Olympic Council, National Olympic Committee, and Sports Federations. The Union Minister must be the chairman of the National Olympic Committee. The Ministry is also responsible for stadiums in Myanmar.

== History ==
From the early 20th Century to 1941, there was the "Burma Athletic Association" in Yangon and the "Upper Burma Athletic Association" in Mandalay for sports affairs. In 1936, an athlete, U Zaw Weit, and a coach, U Shein, competed in the Berlin Olympic Games for British Burma.

On 26 November 1946, Burma organized "Burma Olympic Association" which was governed by General Aung San and Sir Hubert Rance as chairperson and Sir J A Maung Gyi and U Razak as president and vice-president. On 9 July 1947, they joined with International Olympic Committee and competed in the 1948 London Olympics as "Burma".

On 9 October 1950, the "National Fitness Council" was organized. The Council was composed of a chairman (health minister) and 15 members. In 1952, the State Football matches were held. The 1952 Southeast Asian Boxing Games and 1961 SEAP Games were also held.

On 27 May 1964, the "Burma Sports and Physical Education Committee" was organized. The health minister served as chairman and the director general for SPEC Office served as secretary. In 1972, it was organized as "Sports and Physical Education Department" (DSPE) under the Ministry of Health. On 1 July 1993, it moved under the Ministry of Prime Minister Office.

On 18 December 1996, the government established the "Ministry of Sports" for the country's sports affairs. The DSPE was moved from Ministey of Prime Minister Office to the Ministry of Sports. From 1996 to 2011, SPDC appointed Brigadier Generals of Tatmadaw as Minister of Sports. On March 30, 2011, newly elected president Thein Sein appointed Tint Hsan, a businessman, as Union Minister for Sports.

When Htin Kyaw became the president in March 2016, he reduced the number of ministries in his cabinet. He dissolved the Ministry of Sports and moved the department of Sports and Physical Education to the Ministry of Health. But on 25 May 2016, the Ministry of Health was renamed as the Ministry of Health and Sports. Prior to 2018, only the Director General of DSPE took the lead in sports sector. In 2018, former badminton player, Mya Lay Sein, was appointed as deputy minister by Win Myint and acted more effectively on behalf of the Union Minister.

After the 2021 coup d'état, Myint Htwe resigned from his post and Mya Lay Sein was suspended by Min Aung Hlaing. They were replaced by Thet Khaing Win, former permanent Secretary of MOHS under Myint Htwe, and Myo Hlaing, former Director General of DSPE. On 1 August 2021, the management committee of SAC was organized as a caretaker government and they reconstituted the Ministry of Health and Sports as the Ministry of Health and the Ministry of Sports and Youth Affairs.

== List of ministers ==
=== Ministers (1996 - 2011) ===
No	Name	Term start	Term end	Days	Head of state
1	Brigadier General Sein Win	18 February 1996	28 October 1999	1348	Senior General Than Shwe
2	Brigadier General Thura Aye Myint	29 October 1999	30 March 2011	4170	Senior General Than Shwe

=== Union ministers (2011 - incumbent) ===
No	Name	Name of the ministry	Term start	Term end	Days	President
3	Tint Hsan	Ministry of Sports	30 March 2011	30 March 2016	1827	Thein Sein
4	Dr Myint Htwe	Ministry of Health and Sports	30 March 2016	1 February 2021	1769	Htin Kyaw; Win Myint
5	Dr Thet Khaing Win	Ministry of Health and Sports	1 February 2021	1 August 2021	181	Myint Swe (acting)
6	Min Thein Zan	Ministry of Sports and Youth Affairs	1 August 2021	Incumbent	1863	Myint Swe (acting)

=== Deputy ministers ===
No	Name	Name of the ministry	Term start	Term end	Days	Union Minister
1	Aye Myint Kyu	Ministry of Sports	30 March 2011	6 September 2012	526	Tint Hsan
2	Thaung Htike	Ministry of Sports	7 September 2012	30 March 2016	1300	Tint Hsan
3	Zaw Win	Ministry of Sports	29 July 2013	30 March 2016	975	Tint Hsan
4	Dr Mya Lay Sein	Ministry of Health and Sports	2 July 2018	1 February 2021	945	Dr Myint Htwe
5	Myo Hlaing	Ministry of Health and Sports	7 February 2021	Incumbent	2044	Dr Thet Khaing Win
5	Myo Hlaing	Ministry of Sports and Youth Affairs	7 February 2021	Incumbent	2044	Min Thein Zan
6	Dr Soe Win	Ministry of Sports and Youth Affairs	19 August 2022	21 July 2023	336	Min Thein Zan
7	Zin Min Htet	Ministry of Sports and Youth Affairs	21 July 2023	Incumbent	1144	Min Thein Zan

== Departments ==
- Union Minister Office
- Department of Sports and Physical Education
- Department of Youth Affairs

== See also ==
- Cabinet of Burma
- Ministry of Health and Sports (Myanmar)
- 2015 Myanmar National Sports Festival
