= 1936 Burmese general election =

- 26 November 1936

132 seats in the House of Representatives 67 seats needed for a majority

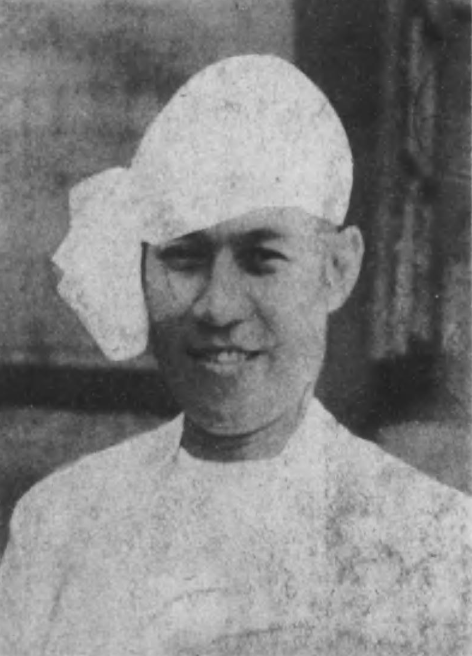

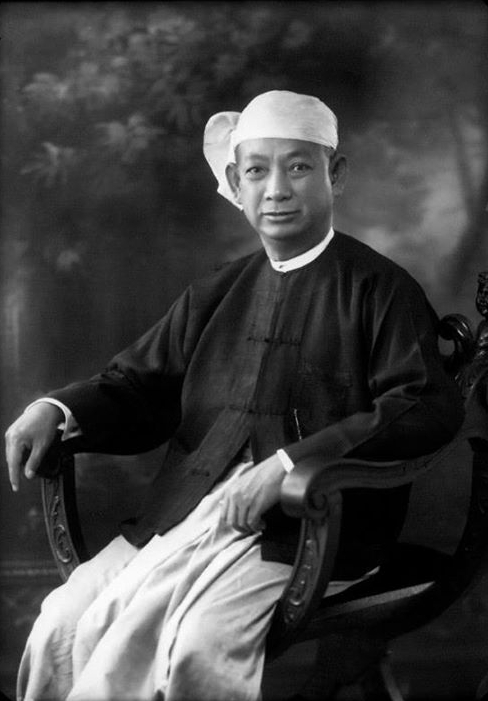
	First party	Second party	Third party
Leader	U Ba Pe	Ba Maw	Chit Hlaing
Party	United GCBA	Poor Man's Party	Hlaing-Myat-Paw GCBA
Seats won	46	16	12
Viceroy before election
The Marquess of Linlithgow
Premier
Ba Maw
Poor Man's Party

General elections were held in Burma on 26 November 1936. The Government of India Act 1935 separated Burma from British India as of 1 April 1937, and created a 36-seat Senate and a 132-seat House of Representatives. The pro-constitution United GCBA of U Ba Pe emerged as the largest bloc in the House of Representatives, winning 46 seats. However, few parties were willing to work with U Ba Pe, and the Governor invited Ba Maw to form a government, despite his Poor Man's Party winning only 16 seats. Maw became Chief Minister after forming a coalition with Chit Hlaing and other "moderate extremists".

== Electoral system ==
The 132 seats in House of Representatives consisted of 91 members elected in single-member non-communal constituencies and 41 members elected from reserved seats. However, large areas of the country in the north and east including the Shan States remained directly governed by the Governor and did not elect members of the House. Half of the 36 seats in the Senate were appointed by the Governor, whilst the remaining half were elected by members of the House of Representatives.

Seat type	Number
General constituencies	91
Karen constituencies	12
Urban Indian constituencies	8
Burma Chamber of Commerce constituency	5
European constituency	3
Anglo-Burman constituency	2
Burma Indian Chamber of Commerce constituency	2
Indian Labour constituencies	2
Non-Indian Labour constituencies	2
Burmese Chamber of Commerce constituency	1
Chinese Chamber of Commerce constituency	1
Nattukottai Chettiyar's Association constituency	1
Rangoon Trades Association constituency	1
Rangoon University constituency	1
Total	132

== Campaign ==
Several of the reserved seats were uncontested, including Bassein North (Karen), Mandalay Indian Urban, the three-member European constituency, the Burmese Chamber of Commerce seat, the Nakkukottai Chettyar's Association seat, the five-member Burma Chamber of Commerce constituency, the Rangoon Trades Association seat and the Chinese Chamber of Commerce seat.

== Results ==
Party	Votes	%	Seats
United GCBA			46
Poor Man's Party			16
Hlaing-Myat-Paw GCBA			12
Komin Kochin Aphwe			3
Fabian Party			0
Independent Party			0
Independents			14
Karen reserved seats			12
Commercial reserved seats	521		11
Indian reserved seats	31,596		8
European reserved seats			3
Indian Labour reserved seats	19,546		2
Non-Indian Labour reserved seats	8,747		2
Anglo-Burman reserved seat	9,050		2
Rangoon University reserved seat	200		1
Total			132
Source: Singh, Cady

=== Members ===
==== Senate ====
Elected	Nominated
U San Aung, Sra Shwe Ba, U Kyaw Din, G. E. Du Bern, U Maung Gyee, Khan Bahadur Ibrahim, Lal Muhammad Khan, U Ba Nyun, U Nyun, Mirza Muhammad Rafi, U Nyun (separate from the previous one), A. Rahim, U Ba Thane, U Ba Thein, U Thwin, U Ba U, G. G. Wodehouse, U Kyaw Zan	Thra San Baw, C. H. Campagnac, Sir Oscar de Glanville, Sir Joseph Maung Gyi, U Po Hla, U Kyaw, U Ba Lwin, U Ba Maung, U Maung Nge, U Nyun, Sir San C. Po, Teik Tin Pyu, Dr. Daw Saw Sa, U Ba Sein, J Tait, U Aung Thin, U Tha Zan U, U Kyaw Zan
Source: Reed

==== House of Representatives ====
U Tun, U Pe Maung, U Ba Yin, U Lu Sin, U Tha Saing, U Sein Pe, U Tharrawady Maung Maung, U Maung Myit, U Ba Ohn, U Thi, U Bo, U Aung Nyun, U Ba Yin, U Ba Chaw, U An Gyi, U Paw Tun, U Po Aung, U Soe Maung, U Sein Win, U Kya Gaing, Dr. Thein Maung, U Lu Wa, U Ohn Khin, U Ba Win, Daw Ah Ma, U Po Loon, U Kyaw Ma, U Shin, U Ba Din, U Ba Gyi, U Ohn Nyun, U Thant, U Mya (B.Sc, B. L.), U Ba Yin, U Maung Maung, U Ohn Maung, Ong Sein Woon, U Shwe, U San Lu, U Po Hmin, U Ba, U Lu Gyaw, U Mya (B. A.), U Pu, Dr. Ba Maw, U Tun Aung Gyaw, U Kun, U Po Yin, U Ba Shwe, U Ba U, U Ba Pe, U On Pe, U Chit Hlaing, U Ba Than, U Tun Aung, Aw Myaw Shu, U Ba Pe, M. M. Ohn Ghine, H. C. Khoo, U Po Hmyin, Saw Po Chit, Sydney Loo Nee, Saw Mya Thein, U Tun Kin, U Shwe Nyun, U Kan Aye, Saw Pe Tha, U Thaw Dwe, U Hla Pe, Saw Johnson D. Po Min, S. Mahmud, B. N. Dass, Ramniwas Bagla, R. G. Aiyangar, K. C. Bose, A. M. A. Karim Gani, A. Narayana Rao, S. R. Roy, J. A. L. Wischam, A. B. Choudhury, U Ba Hlaing, H. C. Talukdar, U Myo Nyun, S. N. Haji, A. W. Adamjee, U Tun Pe, Ganga Singh, U Ba Khaing, J. Webster, F. B. Leach, E. C. V. Fouear, W. T. Melntyre, J. I. Nelson, U Aye Maung, Chan Cheng Taik, J. F. Gibson, A. M. M. Vellayan Chettiyar

== Aftermath ==
Despite winning the most seats, the United GCBA was unable to form a government as the party began to split soon after the elections. This allowed the Poor Man's Party to put together a coalition government which took power in March 1937; it included former People's Party member U Pu, U Paw Tun from the Hlaing-Myat-Paw GCBA, Saw Pe Tha from the Karen group and U Htoon Aung Gyaw from the Arakanese. Poor Man's Party MPs U Tharrawaddy Maung Maung and Thein Maung were also appointed to the cabinet, whilst Chit Hlaing became Speaker of the House. Ba Maw was sworn in as the Premier of Burma by the Governor Sir Archibald Douglas Cochrane. The government also gained support from the commercial MPs representing Indians, Chinese, & Europeans, so many of the Poor Man's Party's more radical campaign promises were dropped.
