= Thein Maung =

Burmese politician

Dr. Thein Maung
- သိန်းမောင်
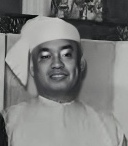
- Thein Maung in 1943

10th President of the Rangoon Municipal Corporation
- In office 6 January 1931 – 31 December 1931
- Preceded by: Richard Rushall
- Succeeded by: Paw Tun

Personal details
- Born: Thein Maung; January 2, 1891 Paungde, Myanmar
- Died: May 23, 1946 (aged 55)
- Spouse: Khin Khin Latt
- Children: 1
- Parents: Sein Dar (father); Hla Phyu (mother)
- Occupation: Politician, Medical Doctor
- Known for: being the first Burmese ambassador to Japan

Thein Maung (Burmese: သိန်းမောင်; January 2, 1891—May 23, 1946) was a Burmese politician and medical doctor. He was the first Burmese ambassador to Japan and one of the 21-leader members of the YMBA and the GCBA.

== Early life ==
Thein Maung was born on January 2, 1891, in Paungde, Myanmar. He attended Paungde Government Middle School, Yangon Government High School, and St. Patrick's High School in Mawlamyine. In 1913, he received his B.A from Yangon College. He also received an M.M.F. in medicine from the College of Kolkata.

== Career ==
In 1923, he served as a member of the Diakite Legislative Council. From 1925–1926 and from 1931–1932, he served as the principal of Myoma National School. In 1934, he became a member of the Indian Legislative Council. While serving as a member, he sought to secede from India and regain the Burmese monastery in Bodh Gaya through the hands of the Hindu monk Mahan. In 1936, he served as a member of the Legislative Council of the United GCBA.

Thein Maung served as Minister of Commerce of the Coalition Government (1937–1939) led by Dr. Ba Maw, which was part of the 91 departments of administration. After Burma was occupied by the Empire of Japan, he served as finance minister in Ba Maw's government from 1942 to 1944. In 1944, he also served as the first Burmese ambassador to Japan in Tokyo.

=== The Thirty Comrades ===
Before the formation of the Burmese Army and Thirty Comrades, Thakin Mya, Kodaw Hmaing, Ba Lwin and others chose to lead Aung San to fight against the British in 1939. Colonel Suzuki Keiji arrived in Burma in May 1940 and met secretly with Maung, Hmaing, Mya, and Lwin in September. He helped Aung San and Hla Myaing to reach the Japanese military headquarters in Taipei (now Taiwan) from Amoi, and also helped them get to Japan via Taipei.

Japan-Burma Friendship Society Dr. Thein Maung arranged for communication between Aung San and Colonel Suzuki Keiji. He was the main supporter of the Thirty Comrades led by Aung San and their main facilitator for military training in Japan.

== Recognition ==
In February 1943, he visited Japan at the invitation of the Japanese government. He was awarded the Tat Naywun Order by Hirohito, the 124th emperor of Japan.

== Personal life ==
Thein Maung married Daw Khin Khin Latt, the daughter of Min Htin Hla Kyaw Khaung, who was the Graduate Artillery Minister during the reign of King Thibaw Min. Together, they had a daughter, Daw Khin Thein.

== Death ==
After the end of the Second World War and the surrender of the Japanese army, Allied forces arrested and imprisoned Maung at the Burmese Embassy in Sugamo Prison, Tokyo. He became sick in prison and was sent back to Burma. He died on the ship back on May 23, 1946.
