= Hnin Mya =

Burmese politician

Member of the Legislative Council
- In office 1932–1936
- Constituency: Moulmein Town

Personal details
- Born: 10 December 1887 Kyaikmaraw, Burma
- Died: 28 November 1974 (aged 86)

Hnin Mya (Burmese: နှင်းမြ, 10 December 1887 – 28 November 1974) was a Burmese politician. In 1932 she became the first female member of the Legislative Council.

== Biography ==
Hnin Mya was the sister of Chit Hlaing, a prominent politician. After women were granted the right to stand for election in 1929, she was elected to the Legislative Council from the Moulmein Town constituency in the 1932 elections, becoming its first female member. Following her election, she offered to allow the man she defeated to take the seat. During her first term in the legislature she submitted bills to allow all women over the age of 18 to vote, end property taxation and allow Burmese women to inherit the estates of non-Burmese husbands. When the Legislative Council was replaced by the Legislature in 1936, she was re-elected, remaining the only woman in the legislature.

She died in 1974.
