= Hlaing-Myat-Paw GCBA =

The Hlaing-Myat-Paw GCBA was a political party in Burma led by Chit Hlaing.

== History ==
One of several parties originating from the General Council of Burmese Associations, the Hlaing-Myat-Paw GCBA was a merger of the factions led by Chit Hlaing and U Su. The party contested the 1936 general elections, with opposition to the new constitution as its only policy. It won 12 seats in the House of Representatives, and was included in the coalition government formed by Ba Maw; Chit Hlaing became Speaker of the House and party member U Paw Tun was appointed to the cabinet.
