= Poor Man's Party =

Poor Man's Party ဆင်းရဲသား ဝံသာနု အဖွဲ့;
- Leader: Ba Maw
- Founder: Ba Maw
- Founded: 1935
- Merged into: Freedom Bloc
- Ideology: Revolutionary socialism Burmese nationalism Marxism
- Political position: Left-wing

The Poor Man's Party (Burmese: ဆင်းရဲသား ဝံသာနု အဖွဲ့; also known as the Sinyetha or Proletarian) was a political party in Burma led by Ba Maw.

== History ==
The party was formed in 1935 in order to contest the 1936 general elections, one of numerous parties in the 1920s and 1930s that had grown out of the General Council of Burmese Associations. It aimed to appeal to the peasantry, calling for reductions in rents and tax, elections for village heads, state-provided credit for farmers and the buy-back of foreign-owned agricultural land.

Although the party only won 16 of the 132 seats in the House of Representatives in the elections, Ba Maw was able to form a government, although reaching agreement with other parties required him to abandon much of the party's manifesto.

Following the start of World War II, the party merged with the Dobama Asiayone to form the Freedom Bloc.
