= Than Khin =

Wife of Burmese Prime Minister U Saw

Than Khin (Burmese: သန်းခင်) was the wife of U Saw, the Prime Minister of British Burma. She was a Nanyinwun Kadaw. After the death of her first husband, Maung Galay, a criminal officer, she became a widow and married to U Saw. After the war, she served in the All Burma Women's Independence League along with Khin Kyi and Lady Paw Tun. When U Saw was sentenced to death for killing government ministers, Than Khin tried to rent a barristers-at-law from London to save him. However appeals to the High Court of Burma were rejected on 8 March 1948. In 1948, she was a widow again and could not return to politics until her death. While U Saw was in death sentence, he ordered Than Khin from prison to pay life compensations for the nine martyrs he killed. After Than Khin paid for the life compensations to the family members of the eight martyrs, she finally gave a compensation to Khin Kyi, but she refused. Khin Kyi says,

"I became a widow because your husband killed my husband. You will soon become a widow, so I do not want to take that life compensation."
