= U Saw =

Burmese politician (1900–1948)

- စော
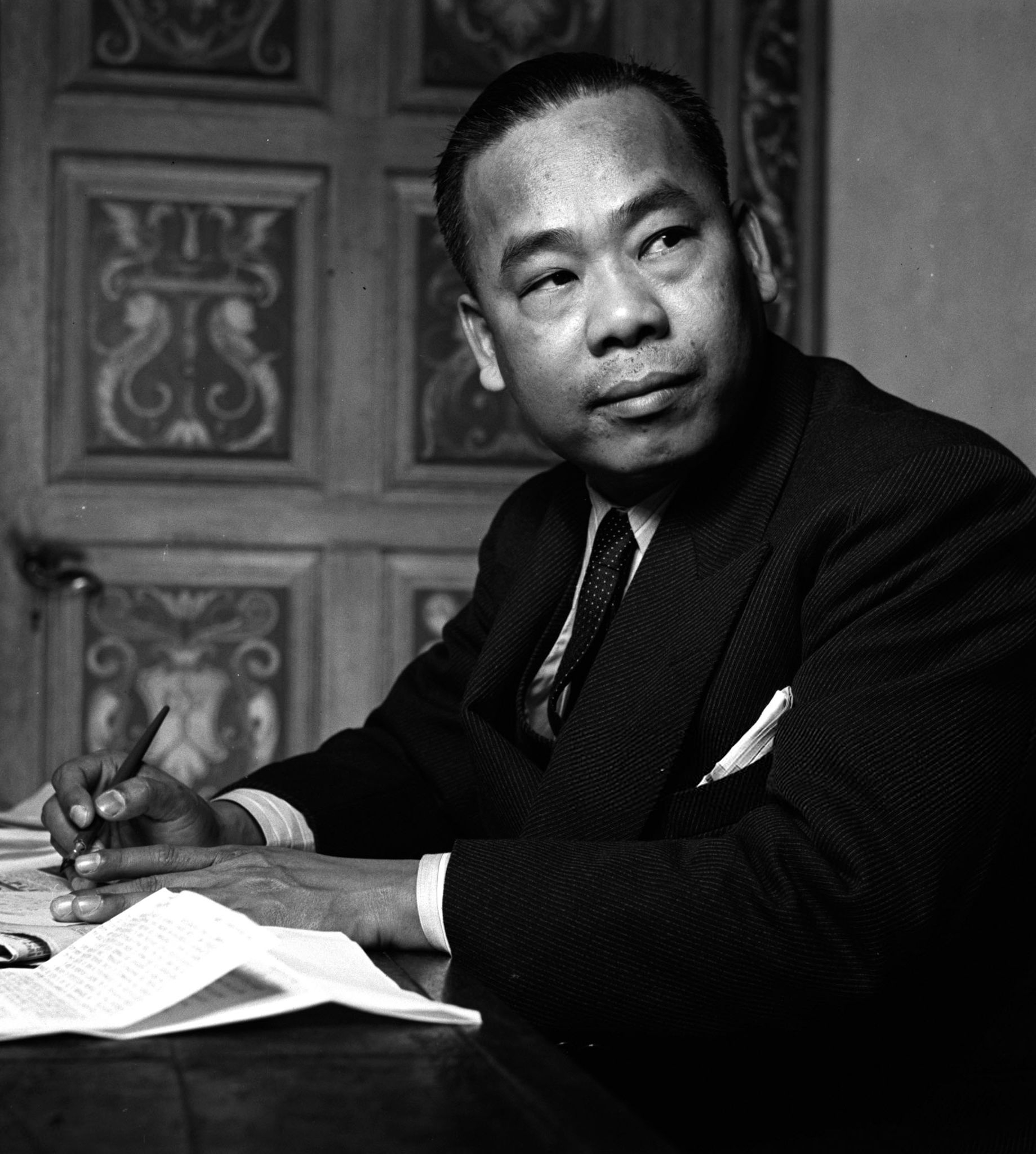
- Saw in 1941

Prime Minister of British Burma
- In office 1940 – 19 February 1942
- Preceded by: Maung Pu
- Succeeded by: Sir Paw Tun

Personal details
- Born: Saw; 16 March 1900 Okpho, Tharrawaddy District, British Burma
- Died: 8 May 1948 (aged 48) Rangoon, Union of Burma
- Spouse: Than Khin
- Parent(s): Phoe Kyuu (father); Daw Pann (mother)
- Occupation: Politician

Military service
- Allegiance: Galon Army

U Saw, also known as Galon U Saw (ဦးစော or ဂဠုန်ဦးစော, lit. Garuda U Saw, pronounced [ɡəlòʊɰ̃ ʔú sɔ́]; 16 March 1900 – 8 May 1948), was a leading Burmese politician who served as Prime Minister of British Burma during the colonial era before the Second World War. He is also known for his role in the assassination of Burma's national hero Aung San and other independence leaders in July 1947, only months before Burma gained independence from Britain in January 1948. He and five others were executed by hanging for the assassination.

== Early life and education ==
U Saw was born on 16 March 1900 in Okpho, Tharrawaddy District, British Burma. He was the second of four sons of the landowner Phoe Kyuu and Daw Pann. He was educated at a Roman Catholic missionary school in Gyobingauk. In 1927, he became a senior lawyer. He was married to Than Khin.

== Political career ==
A lawyer by training, U Saw first made his name by defending Saya San, a former monk and medicine man, who became the leader of the Galon Peasant Rebellion (1930–32), at his trial by the British colonial government, and came to be known as Galon U Saw. In 1935, he purchased the Thuriya (Sun) newspaper and turned it into a device to promote himself and his political interests. He was elected to the Legislative Council in the 1936 general elections as a member of the United GCBA. Two years later he formed the Patriot's Party, and from 1940 until 1942, he served as the third Prime Minister of Burma. In November 1941, he travelled to London in an unsuccessful attempt to gain a promise from Winston Churchill that Burma be granted Dominion status after the Second World War, citing principles expressed by Churchill and Franklin D. Roosevelt in the Atlantic Charter. U Saw also spent several weeks in Washington D.C., seeking to convince Roosevelt to pressure Churchill into granting Burma independence. At the same time, he made contact with the Japanese to secure his own political future should Japan invade Burma. The British discovered incriminating papers relating to the communications through the breaking of Japanese ciphers, and following his interception in Palestine on his return journey, U Saw was detained for 4 years in Uganda.

Upon his return to Rangoon after the War, U Saw saw himself as a contender for the office of the first Prime Minister of independent Burma. However, the first postwar elections in Burma of April 1947 returned an overwhelming victory for Aung San's Anti-Fascist People's Freedom League (AFPFL) organization. The victory of the AFPFL had been interpreted as a universal endorsement of Aung San, but that was far from the truth. The AFPFL was a coalition of widely divergent political parties including primarily Communists, Socialists, and the Burma National Army (BNA) led by Gen. Aung San, and, as the subsequent civil war in Burma demonstrated, no single group or individual could claim to lead it effectively as a whole; many to this day however believe that if Aung San had lived longer the course of modern Burmese history would have been very different, for he was the one leader that could unite the numerous and diverse ethnic minorities as well as the fractious and disparate political groups. Nonetheless, Aung San became the leader of the Governor's Executive Council by virtue of the victory of the AFPFL.

U Saw had attended, with Thakin Nu (the Socialist leader who became the first Prime Minister of independent Burma as a direct consequence of the untimely death of Aung San and the earlier expulsion of the Communists from the AFPFL), the first Panglong Conference in March 1946, convened by the Yawnghwe Sawbwa Sao Shwe Thaik to discuss the future of the Shan States; the Kachin, Chin and Karen representatives were also invited. It made no impact however on the Frontier Areas Administration (FAA), although a United Burma Cultural Society was formed as a result with Sao Shwe Thaik as chairman and U Saw as secretary.

In January 1947, U Saw and the Socialist leader Thakin Ba Sein were the only members of the delegation to London, headed by Aung San, to negotiate with the British government for Burmese independence, who refused to sign the Aung San-Attlee Agreement. Also by 1947, political parties had set up their own militia including Aung San's Pyithu Yèbaw Tat (People's Volunteer Organisation or PVO; ပြည်သူ့ရဲဘော်တပ်), and U Saw too formed his own pocket army called the Galon tat (Garuda Militia, ဂဠုန်တပ်) to commemorate his defence of the Galon rebel prisoners. The former British Governor Sir Reginald Dorman-Smith had appeared to favour older pre-war politicians such as U Saw and Sir Paw Tun, whose popularity was now at a low ebb. The new Governor, Sir Hubert Rance, along with Lord Mountbatten of Burma, however, decided to back Aung San and the AFPFL, inviting them to join the Executive Council in order to calm the post-war political unrest.

== Crime and punishment ==
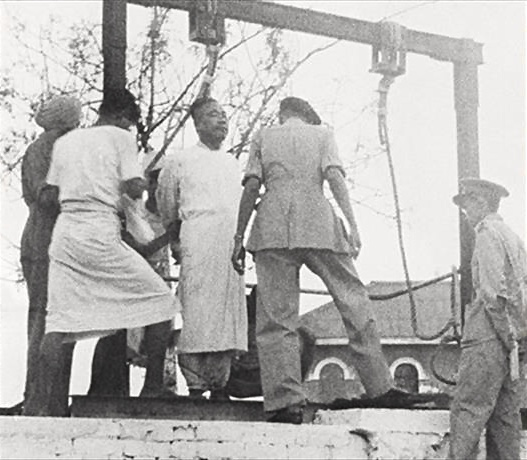
U Saw stands on the gallows at Insein prison in Rangoon, on May 8, 1948, as the hangman's assistants manacle his hands behind him

On 19 July 1947, a gang of armed paramilitaries broke into the Secretariat Building in downtown Rangoon during a meeting of the Executive Council (the shadow government established by the British in preparation for the transfer of power) and assassinated Aung San and eight of his cabinet ministers; a cabinet secretary and a bodyguard were also killed. The evidence clearly implicated U Saw as the ringleader. U Saw and nine others behind the incident were arrested by the British authorities, and tried before a special tribunal set up by Sir Hubert Rance, the British colonial governor. One defendant was acquitted after testifying for the prosecution, while U Saw and his remaining eight codefendants were found guilty and sentenced to death on December 30, 1947. After Burma became independent in January 1948, the Burmese authorities decided to carry out the verdict of the British court, and in March 1948, the Rangoon High Court rejected his claims that the tribunal lacked jurisdiction and requests for a new trial, and upheld the death sentence. At the last hour, the death sentences of three accomplices of U Saw were commuted to life in prison, effectively 20 years under Burmese law.

U Saw and three of his accomplices were executed by hanging at Insein Prison on May 8, 1948. The same day, the two other accomplices were hanged at Rangoon Central Jail. U Saw was buried, according to custom, in an unmarked grave within the prison.

Many mysteries still surround the assassination. There were rumours of a conspiracy involving the British — a variation on this theory was given new life in a documentary broadcast by the BBC on the 50th anniversary of the assassination in 1997. What did emerge in the course of the investigations at the time of the trial, however, was that several low-ranking British officers had sold guns to a number of Burmese politicians, including U Saw. Shortly after U Saw's conviction, Captain David Vivian, a British Army officer, was sentenced to five years imprisonment for supplying U Saw with weapons. Captain Vivian escaped from prison during the Karen uprising in Insein in early 1949. Little information about his motives was revealed during his trial or after the trial.

== See also ==
- Burmese Martyrs' Day
- History of Burma

Preceded by Maung Pu	Prime Minister of Burma; 1940–1942	Succeeded by Sir Paw Tun
