= Britons in Myanmar =

Britons in Myanmar (historically Burma) had a significant impact due to over a century of colonialism.

== History ==
=== Colonial era ===
Britons had significant confidence in their ability to maintain control over and change Burma. They believed that it could be guarded best within British India while still being able to maintain its own unique potential and culture, and that the potential of the country's geography and incoming migrants promised a bright commercial future. in the early 1930s, when the Saya San Rebellion took place, legal processes were kept in place to a significant extent despite the serious threat to the colonial state, emphasising the importance given to the civilising mission.

As time went on, increasing amounts of nonwhite participation in local administration forced Britons to band together to a greater extent, resulting in more acceptance toward Anglo-Indians. David Baillargeon has argued that British administration was also bolstered by other Western groups, as with the Burma Corporation that was founded by future American President Herbert Hoover.

In 1942, many Indians and Europeans were forced to flee Burma due to the Japanese invasion.

== See also ==
- Anglo-Burmese people
- Burmese people in the United Kingdom
- Burmese Days – 1934 novel by George Orwell
