= Myanmar–United Kingdom relations =

- Myanmar: United Kingdom

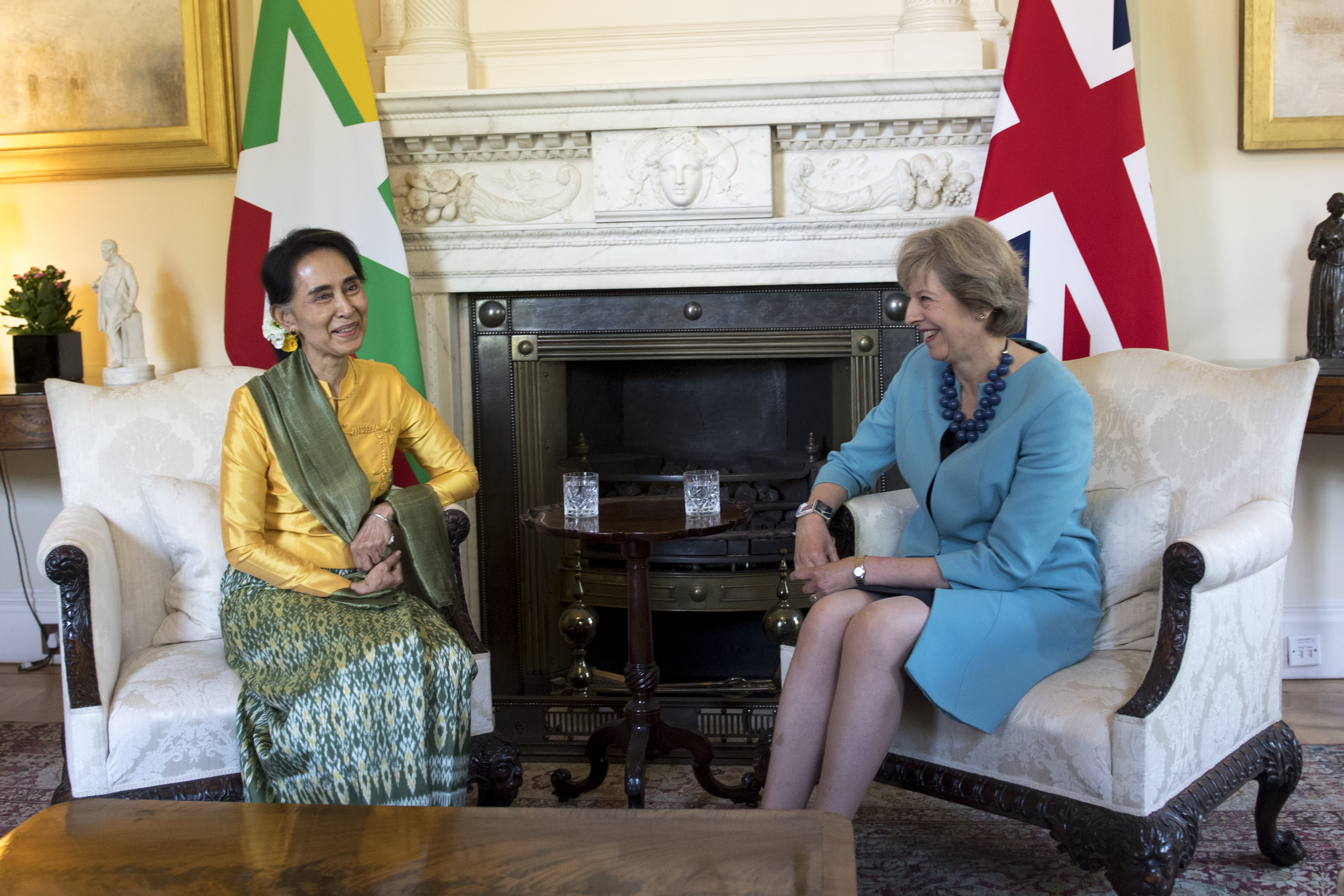
Myanmar State Counsellor Aung San Suu Kyi with British Prime Minister Theresa May in 10 Downing Street, September 2016.

Myanmar–United Kingdom relations entail the bilateral, historical, and diplomatic relations between the Republic of the Union of Myanmar (formerly Burma) and the United Kingdom of Great Britain and Northern Ireland. The UK governed Myanmar from 1824 to 1942 and 1945 until 1948, when Myanmar achieved full independence. Both countries established diplomatic relations on 7 July 1947.

Both countries share common membership of the United Nations, and the World Trade Organization. Bilaterally the two countries have a Development Partnership, and a Double Taxation Agreement.

== History ==
=== Before 1948 ===
Myanmar was ruled by the British Empire from 1824 to 1948 and several wars were fought between the colonial power and Burmese rebels seeking independence. Myanmar eventually achieved independence from British rule on 4 January 1948, which is celebrated annually as Independence Day in Myanmar.

=== After 1948 ===
The United Kingdom kept a residual interest in Myanmar after its independence. In the 1990s, National League for Democracy opposition leader Aung San Suu Kyi became of interest as she was married to a British academic and resided in the UK prior to her return to Burma. Her sons Kim and Alexander Aris also reside in the UK.

After the 2015 Myanmar general election, Aung San Suu Kyi became State Counsellor of Myanmar. She met British Prime Minister Theresa May in 2016, thanking Britain for its "friendship and support" during its political transition out of military dictatorship.

=== Recent history ===
The UK has raised concerns with Myanmar about the Rohingya genocide with then British Foreign Secretary Jeremy Hunt raising the issue with State Counsellor Aung San Suu Kyi during a state-visit in 2018. The UK has supported United Nations fact finding missions to Myanmar to investigate crimes against humanity, and has drafted a United Nations Security Council resolution to put a timeline on Myanmar allowing the return of more than 700,000 Rohingya Muslim refugees from neighbouring Bangladesh.

==== Military junta (2021—present) ====
Relations between Myanmar and the UK have greatly deteriorated since the coup d'état on 1 February 2021, when democratically elected leaders, including State Counsellor Aung San Suu Kyi were overthrown and detained by the Tatmadaw. The UK government strongly condemned the coup and called for a swift return to civilian rule. The UK placed sanctions on several Myanmar junta officials, including Defence Minister General Mya Tun Oo, in response to the coup.

Myanmar recalled its Ambassador to the United Kingdom Kyaw Zwar Minn on 9 March 2021, after he publicly called for the release of jailed State Counsellor Aung San Suu Kyi. He refused to return to Myanmar citing safety concerns. On 7 April 2021, Minn was locked out of the Embassy in London by a military attaché and was forced to sleep in his car overnight. He was replaced by his deputy, Chit Win. The British government acknowledged the dismissal of Minn, however they condemned the "bullying military regime" in response.

On 31 January 2022, the UK government imposed sanctions on Myanmar justice officials, including Thida Oo. The UK announced a further round of sanctions on 25 August 2022 against military-affiliated businesses in Myanmar, coinciding with the five-year anniversary of the Rohingya genocide. That same day, former British ambassador to Myanmar Vicky Bowman and her husband Htein Lin were arrested in Yangon, and were sentenced to a year in prison for "breaching immigration laws" on 2 September 2022. Myanmar was excluded from invitations by the UK government for the state funeral of Elizabeth II on 19 September 2022.

On February 1, 2024, the Foreign, Commonwealth and Development Office (FCDO) of the United Kingdom declared additional sanctions against Myanmar in response to the continuous violation of human rights. These sanctions specifically targeted entities associated with the military that have been involved in repressing the civilian population and committing severe human rights abuses in the Southeast Asian nation.

== Diplomatic missions ==
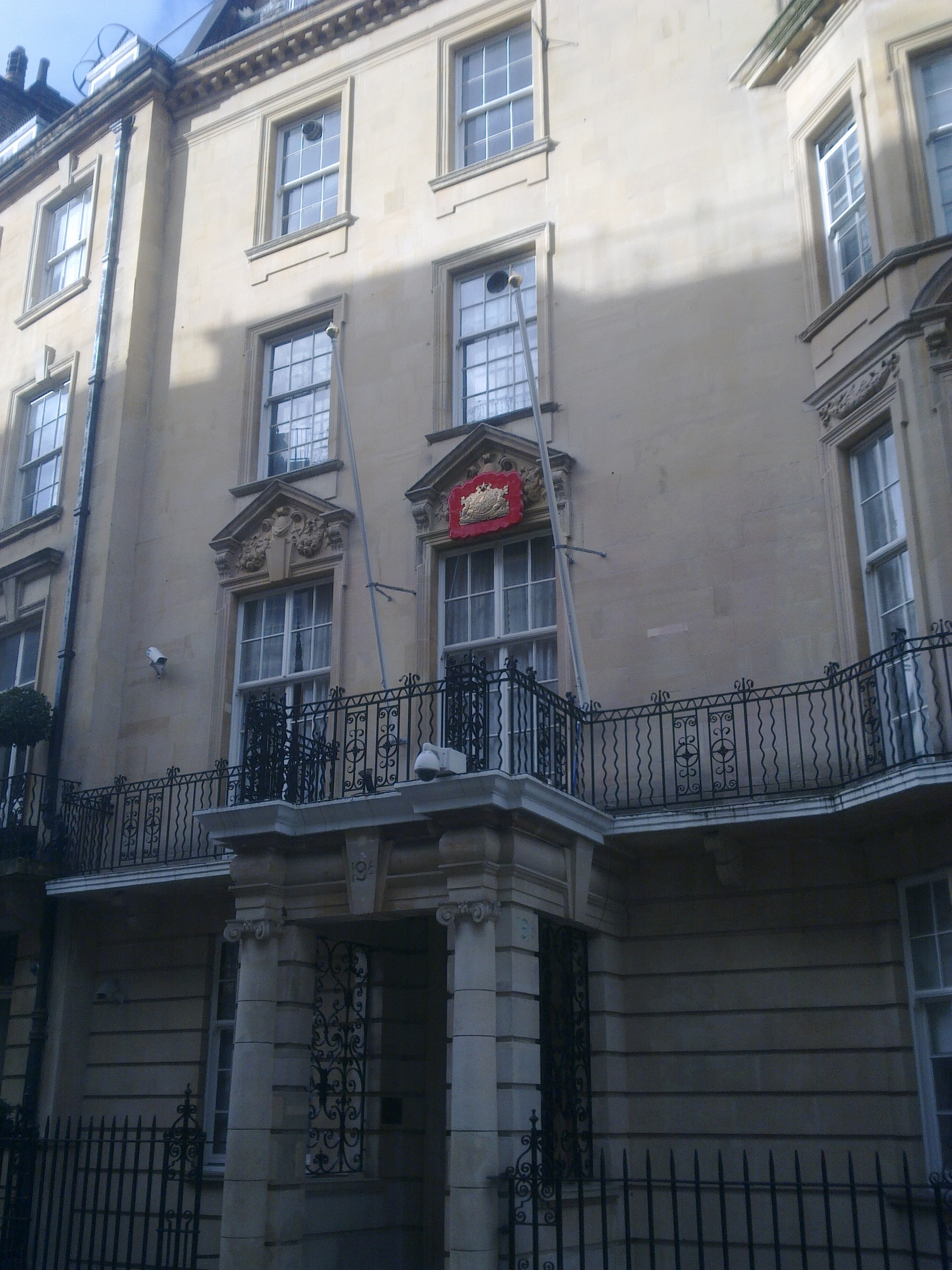
Embassy of Myanmar in London

== See also ==
- Burmese people in the United Kingdom
- Foreign relations of Myanmar
- Foreign relations of the United Kingdom
