= Freedom Bloc =

- Burmese name: ဗမာ့ထွက်ရပ်ဂိုဏ်း
- Leader: Ba Maw; Aung San; U Nu; Thakin Than Tun; Thakin Mya; Thein Maung
- President: Ba Maw
- General Secretary: Aung San
- Founded: October 1939
- Dissolved: 1944
- Merger of: Dobama Asiayone; Poor Man's Party; All-Burma Students Association
- Succeeded by: Greater Burma Party
- Ideology: Burmese independence Anti–British imperialism Pro–Japanese imperialism 1939–1942: Marxism

The Freedom Bloc (Burmese: ဗမာ့ထွက်ရပ်ဂိုဏ်း), later known as Dobama-Sinyetha Asiayone (Burmese: တို့ဗမာဆင်းရဲသားအစည်းအရုံး), was a political party in Burma during World War II.

== History ==
The party was established by a merger of Dobama Asiayone (DAA), Ba Maw's Poor Man's Party and the All-Burma Students Association, and was known as the "Htwet Yat Gain" (Burmese: ထွက်ရပ်ဂိုဏ်း, "Association of the Way Out"), although DAA leaders secretly formed the People's Revolutionary Party at the time of the merger. It opposed cooperation with the British war effort unless Burma was guaranteed independence immediately after the war, and threatened to increase its anti-British and anti-war campaign. As a result, the Governor ordered the arrest of the Bloc's leadership in 1940, most of whom remained in prison until the Japanese invasion of 1942.

Following the onset of the Japanese occupation, the party was renamed Dobama-Sinyetha Asiayone and dropped its anti-fascist and socialist outlook due to the Japanese presence. Ba Maw became Head of State and leader of the renamed party.

In 1944 the party was dissolved, with the Greater Burma Party formed to replace it.
