= List of premiers of British Burma =

This article lists the premiers or prime ministers (Burmese: နန်းရင်းဝန်) of British Burma before independence.

== Premiers (1937–1948) ==
N	Portrait	Name	Term of office	
N	Portrait	Name	Took office	Left office
1		Ba Maw	1937	1939
2		Maung Pu	1939	1940
3		U Saw	1940	1942
4		Aung San	1943	1943
(1)		Ba Maw	1943	1945
5		Sir Paw Tun	1945	1945
6		Tun Oke	1945	1946
(5)		Sir Paw Tun	1946	1946
(4)		Aung San	1946	19 July 1947^{†}
7		U Nu	19 July 1947	4 January 1948

== See also ==
- Myanmar
  - Politics of Myanmar
  - List of colonial governors of Burma
  - President of Myanmar
  - List of presidents of Myanmar
  - State Counsellor of Myanmar
  - Vice President of Myanmar
- Lists of office-holders
