= Oscar de Glanville =

Sir Oscar James Lardner de Glanville, CIE, OBE (2 April 1867 – 1942) was an Irish-born barrister and political figure in British Burma who served twice as President of the Legislative Council of Burma.

== Biography ==
Born in Donnybrook, Dublin, de Glanville was the son of Rev James De Glanville, a naval chaplain, and Louisa Mary Lardner. He was educated at Portsmouth Grammar School. In 1882, he received a bronze medal from the Royal Humane Society for saving a drowning woman.

In 1890, de Glanville moved to Burma as the local agent of the British and Foreign Bible Society, serving until 1893. He subsequently practiced as a lawyer, specialising in criminal law, becoming officiating Public Prosecutor in the Rangoon police courts in 1894. He was called to the English bar by the Middle Temple in 1907. He was Western Sub-Divisional Magistrate in Rangoon from 1917 to 1919, and Administrator-General, Official Trustee and Assignee for Burma from 1919 to 1922.

The leader of the Progressive Party (later the Independent Party), de Glanville became a member of the Legislative Council (European Constituency) in 1923, and was elected President of the Legislative Council on 19 February 1927, serving until 1929 or 1930. From 1930 to 1931 he attended the First Round Table Conference as a representative.

He was elected to a second term as President of the Legislative Council in 1932, but experienced increasing difficulty with Burmese nationalists in the council, who saw his presence as being incompatible with their "Burma for the Burmese" policy. In 1934, a motion to remove him on grounds that he did not speak Burmese (which he did speak) was defeated by one vote. A second motion was carried in August the same year, but the Governor, Sir Hugh Stephenson, declined the request. In 1935, another motion for his removal was carried with the support of Burmese ministers, and de Glanville was removed by the Governor. He was later a member of the Senate of Burma.

During the Second World War, de Glanville was evacuated from Rangoon in 1942 and went to Kalaw. Made to leave his house by the Japanese military authorities, de Glanville died sometime in 1942 and was buried in the local Christian cemetery.

de Glanville was appointed OBE in 1918, a Companion of the Order of the Indian Empire (CIE) in the 1925 Birthday Honours, and was knighted in the 1931 New Year Honours. He was appointed an Officer of the Order of St John in 1938.

== Family ==
de Glanville married Ma Lun, a Burmese woman, in 1896; they had four children, the eldest of whom, Robert De Glanville, was killed on the Western Front in 1915. His youngest child, Stephen de Glanville, later served in the Burma Frontier Service.
