= Patriot's Party =

Nationalist political party in Burma

The Patriot's Party (Burmese: မျိုးချစ်ပါတီ; also known as the Myochit) was a nationalist political party in Burma led by U Saw.

== History ==
The party was formed in 1938 by U Saw after he left the United GCBA, and initially consisted of a group of around ten MPs from wealthy backgrounds. The party gained support from businessmen and landlords, and in April 1938 the Galon Tat, the party's paramilitary volunteer corps, was created. The Galon Tat was modelled on fascist organisations in Europe and possibly funded by the Japanese, and by 1941 was the largest volunteer organisation in the country.

When the government led by Ba Maw fell in 1939, Governor Archibald Cochrane included the Patriot's Party in the government, and in 1940 Saw was appointed Premier. However, he was arrested in January 1942 for having contact with the Japanese, who had started an invasion of the country.

Following the war, the party was re-established by some of its members whilst U Saw was imprisoned in Uganda. It joined the Anti-Fascist People's Freedom League, but was ejected after it accepted three seats in the Executive Council, a move that was contrary to the alliance's policy. However, U Saw demanded the party's members leave the council. The party subsequently boycotted the 1947 elections. When he was hanged in 1948 for his role in the assassination of Aung San, the party ceased to exist.

== Policies ==
The party sought to limit Indian immigration to Burma and redistribute foreign-owned land. Other objectives included increasing the proportion of Burmese in the civil service and foreign trade and mining companies.
