= Burmese people in the United Kingdom =

Burmese Britons မြန်မာဗြိတိန်လူမျိုး/ဗြိတိသျှမြန်မာလူမျိုး
- (Myanmar) (United Kingdom)

Total population
- Ethnic Burmese: 7,514 (England and Wales only, 2021)

Regions with significant populations
- London; Manchester; Birmingham; Glasgow; Edinburgh

Languages
- English, Burmese, Karen, Chin

Religion
- Theravada Buddhism; Hinduism; Christianity; Islam

Related ethnic groups
- Bamar people, Karen people, Burmese Americans, Burmese Australians

Burmese people in the United Kingdom (also known as Burmese Britons) are residents and citizens of the United Kingdom with Burmese ancestry or origins. This can include people born in the UK who are of Burmese descent, as well as those born in Myanmar who have migrated to Britain.

== Background ==
Migrants from both the Bamar and Karen ethnic groups constitute parts of Burmese communities in the United Kingdom. A large proportion of Burmese people who migrated to the country before 2011 were from the ethnic minority group of Karens, who sought to flee the military rule in Burma which was formed and led by ethnic Burmans.

Resettlement of multi-ethnic Burmese refugees to Great Britain was carried out under the Gateway Protection Programme, with the Home Office and local councils arranging for local housing and care. In 2005, it was estimated that there were around 8,000 Burmese people living in the United Kingdom, with the majority resident in London, and significant populations in Cardiff, Portsmouth and Gosport.

== History ==
In 2005, members of British Burmese community celebrated the first publicly organised Water Festival, or London Thingyan, events in Stratford and Camden, London. In particular, UK-resident Karens mark their native festivals and adopt traditional dress on such occasions.

Between 2005 and 2008, over two hundred Burmese individuals resettled in Sheffield, England. Arriving via Heathrow airport in the mid-2000s, most of the first Burmese migrants were women and children who had been living in camps along Myanmar's border with Thailand before resettlement in the UK. One notable example is footballer Kler Heh, who was born into a Karen-refugee camp across the border in Thailand before being resettled in Yorkshire age 10; going on to sign a professional contract with Sheffield United. According to the Sheffield City Council, asylum seekers from Myanmar have been particularly relocated to the Yorkshire and the Humber region due to the "State persecution of minority groups and political activists" in the Southeast Asian country.

The 2009 film Moving to Mars documented that lives of two Burmese families which had moved to the United Kingdom. A 2012 Sheffield Hallam University study analyzed mistrust within the British Burmese community; between ethnic Karens and ethnic Burmans, as well as intra-ethnic disputes. Other studies, including a report commissioned by the London Borough of Hounslow, have identified significant problems with Burmese people's adjustment to British society, mental health concerns, language barriers and poverty.

== See also ==
- British East and Southeast Asian
- Britons in Myanmar
- Myanmar-United Kingdom relations
