= United GCBA =

Burmese political party

The United GCBA, also known as the Ngabinsaing (Burmese for "Five Flowers Alliance"), was a political party in Burma led by U Ba Pe.

== History ==
The party was formed in 1936 as a successor to the People's Party, and gained its name "Five Flowers Alliance" from the fact that it consisted of five parties; the People's Party, the Free Burma Party led by U Maung Gyi, the Wun Thar Nu GCBA of Ye U Sayadaw, the Boycott GCBA led by U Ba Si and the Upper Burma 21 group; the party was largely based on factions of the General Council of Burmese Associations (GCBA). In the general elections later in the year, the party won 46 of the 132 seats, but U Ba Pe was unable to form a government. The party was renamed the Nationalist Party the following year, but disintegrated shortly afterwards due to factional infighting. One of the party's MPs, U Saw, subsequently founded the Patriot's Party.
