= Ba Maw =

Burmese leader and independence activist (1893–1977)

His Excellency Ba Maw
- ဒေါက်တာ ဘမော်
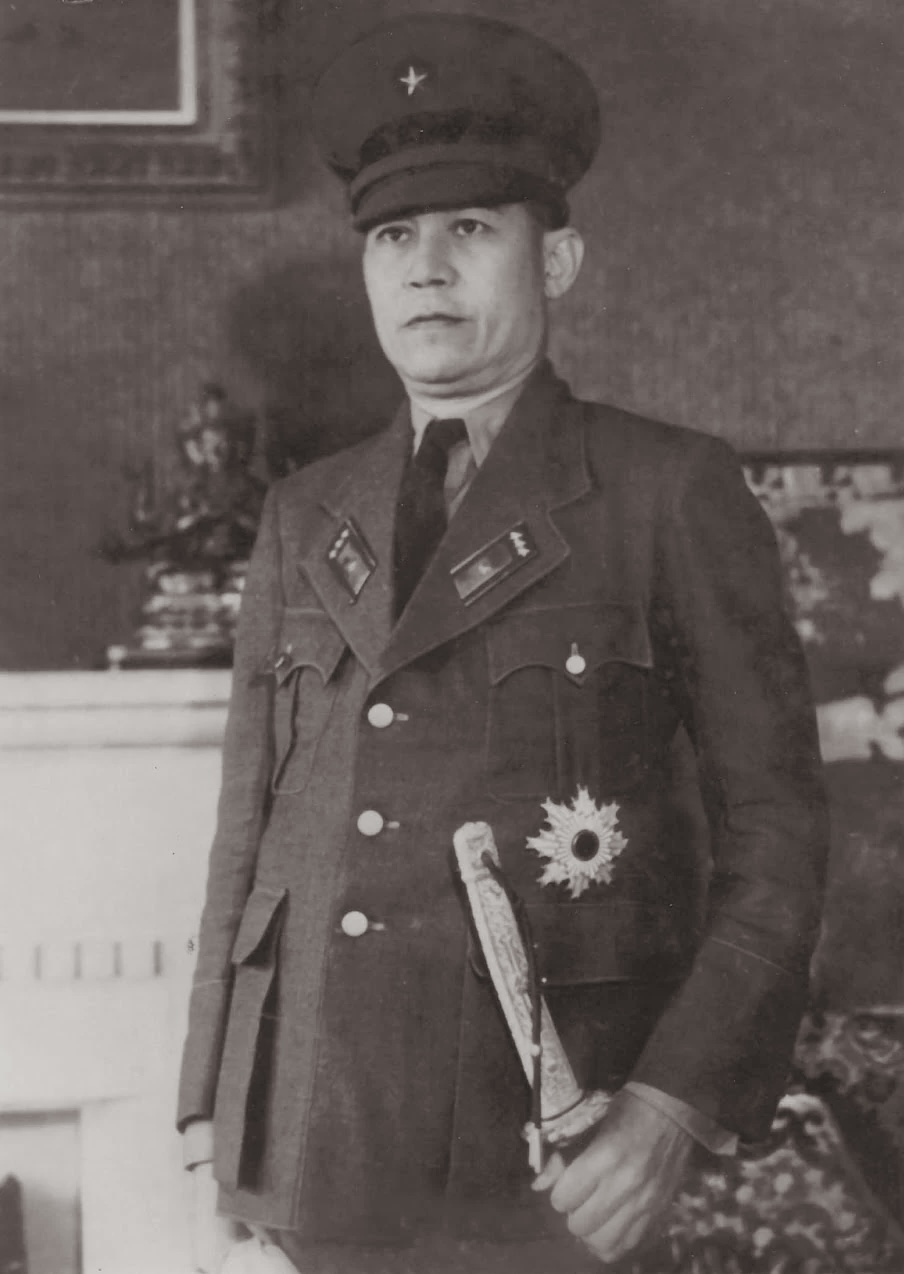
- Ba Maw in 1943

Nainggandaw Adipadi Ashinmingyi and Prime Minister of the State of Burma
- In office 1 August 1943 – 19 August 1945
- Preceded by: Position established
- Succeeded by: Position abolished

1st Premier of British Crown Colony of Burma
- In office 1937–1939
- Preceded by: position established
- Succeeded by: Maung Pu

Personal details
- Born: 8 February 1893 Maubin, Burma Province, British India
- Died: 29 May 1977 (aged 84) Rangoon, Burma
- Party: Poor Man's Party (1935–1939); Freedom Bloc (1939–1944); Mahabama Party (1944–1948)
- Spouse: Khin Ma Ma Maw (m. 1926; died 1967)
- Relations: Ba Han (brother); Bo Yan Naing (son-in-law); Ye Htoon (son-in-law)
- Children: 7 including: Zali Maw, Binnya Maw, Banya Maw, Onma Maw and Tinsa Maw
- Parent(s): Shwe Kye (father); Thein Tin (mother)
- Education: Rangoon College (B.A.); University of Calcutta (M.A.); University of Cambridge (LL.M.); University of Bordeaux (Ph.D.)
- Occupation: Lawyer, politician

Military service
- Allegiance: British Burma, State of Burma, Union of Burma, Socialist Republic of the Union of Burma

Ba Maw (Burmese: ဘမော်, pronounced [ba̰ mɔ̀]; 8 February 1893 – 29 May 1977), known honorifically as Dr. Ba Maw, was a Burmese lawyer and politician, active during the interwar period and Second World War. He was the first Burma Premier (1937–1939) and head of State of Burma from 1943 to 1945.

== Early life and education ==
Ba Maw was born in Maubin. He came from a distinguished family of mixed Mon-Bamar parentage. His father, Shwe Kye was an ethnic Mon from Amherst (now Kyaikkhami) and well-versed in French and English languages. Thus Shwe Kye served as a royal diplomat who accompanied Kinwun Mingyi U Kaung in the Burmese diplomatic missions to Europe in the 1870s, and worked as an assistant tutor to Royal tutor Dr. Mark at the last royal palace of the last Burmese monarchy. Ba Maw's elder brother, Professor Dr Ba Han (1890–1969), was a lawyer as well as a lexicographer and legal scholar, and served as Attorney General of Burma from 1957– 1958. He was brought up as a Christian and later converted to Buddhism to win the favor of Burmese Buddhists.

After an education at Rangoon College, Ba Maw obtained MA degree from the University of Calcutta in 1917. Then he was educated at Cambridge University in England and received a law degree from Gray's Inn where he was called to the bar in 1923. He went on to obtain a doctoral degree from the University of Bordeaux, France. Ba Maw wrote his doctoral thesis in the French language on aspects of Buddhism in Burma.

== Academic career ==
After graduating from Rangoon College in 1913, Ba Maw began working as a teacher at Rangoon Government High School and later at ABM school. In 1917, he got an MA from the University of Calcutta, and became the first English lecturer at Rangoon University where he worked for the next four years.

== Law career ==
From the 1920s onwards, Ba Maw practiced law and dabbled in colonial-era Burmese politics. He achieved prominence in 1931 when he defended the rebel leader, Saya San. San had started a tax revolt in Burma in December 1930, which quickly grew into a more widespread rebellion against British rule. San was captured, tried, convicted and hanged. One of the presiding judges that tried San was another Burmese lawyer, Ba U.

Ba Maw acted as the lead counsel for Saya San and other rebel leaders. According to Ba Maw, the government "...under the cloak of judicial trial, went on enforcing the law against thousands of villagers who knew nothing of that law, but only how they were unable to pay their taxes in time, and their homes and villages were wrecked..."

== Politics ==
=== British Burma ===
In 1934, Ba Maw served as education minister, and then in 1937, he became premier under the new Burmese constitution. In July 1940, Ba Maw resigned from the Legislature of Burma. During a conference of the Sinyetha, he issued seven orders, one of which was, "to refuse to participate in the war in any way as long as freedom was refused to the Burmese." On 6 August 1940, he was arrested for violating the Defence of Burma Rules, and taken to Mandalay for trial.

According to Ba Maw, "My trial in itself was a ritual sort of affair, brief and formal and without any touch of drama in it. All the drama was taking place outside [...] where people everywhere had begun to speak with greater racial feeling and defiance." On 28 August, Ba Maw was found guilty and sentenced to imprisonment for a year. Originally jailed in Mandalay, he was later relocated to Mogok, in northern Burma.

=== Burma under Japanese occupation ===
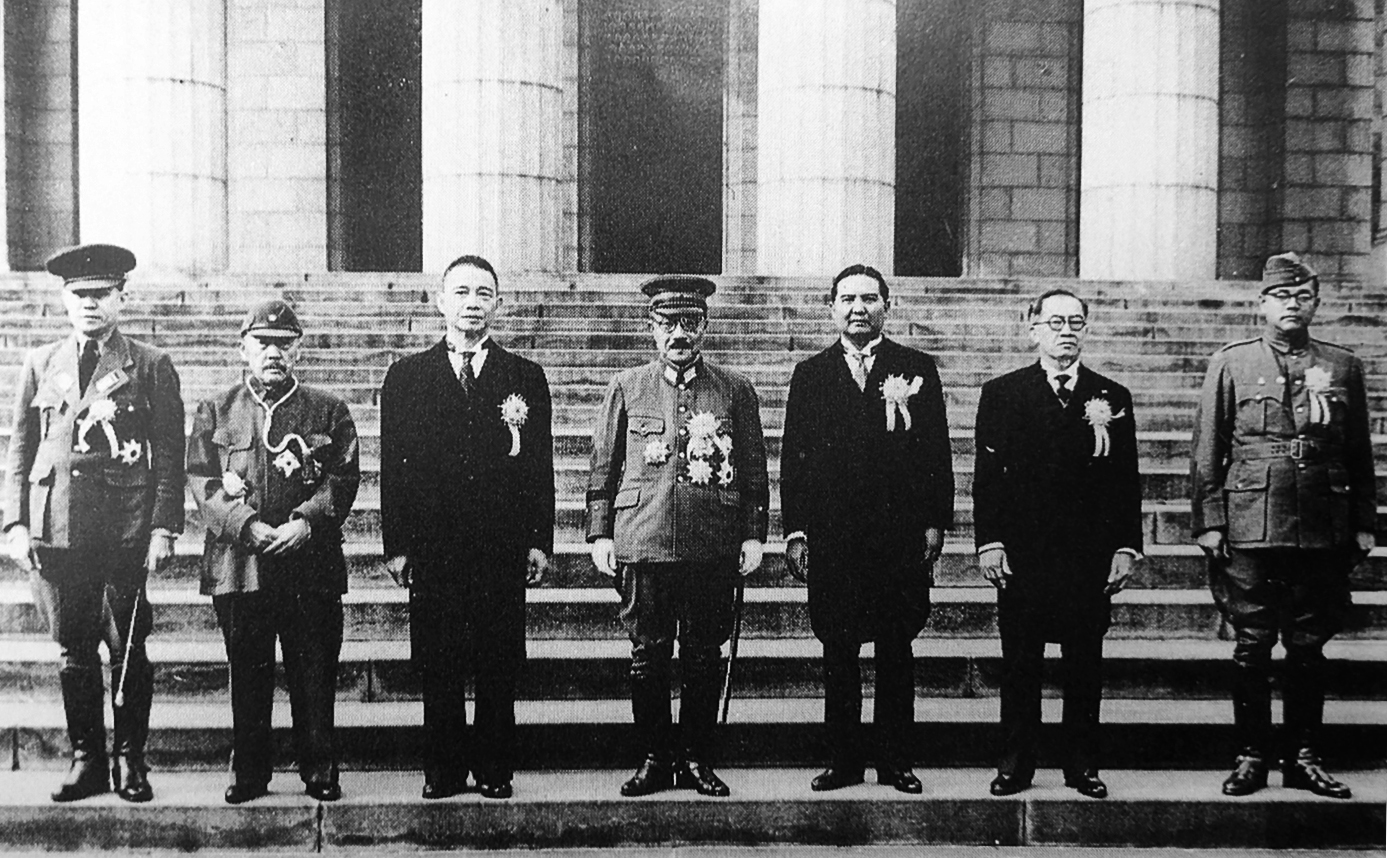
The Greater East Asia Conference in November 1943. The participants were (L–R): Ba Maw, Zhang Jinghui, Wang Jingwei, Hideki Tojo, Wan Waithayakon, José P. Laurel, Subhas Chandra Bose

On 13 April 1942, Ba Maw escaped from Mogok during the Thingyan festival. He and his wife Khin Ma Ma Maw hid out in the hills of Mang Lon until the third week in May, when they established contact with the Japanese. On 4 June, during the Japanese occupation of Burma, Ba Maw was made Chief Civilian Administrator, while Aung San agreed to reform the Burmese Independence Army as the Burma Defense Army. On 1 August 1942, Ba Maw was inaugurated as the head of the Burmese government.

As the war situation gradually turned against the Japanese, the Japanese government advanced its previous promise to grant Burma independence after the end of the war. The Japanese felt that this would give the Burmese a real stake in an Axis victory in the Second World War, creating resistance against possible re-colonization by the western powers, and increased military and economic support from Burma for the Japanese war effort. A Burma Independence Preparatory Committee chaired by Ba Maw was formed 8 May 1943.

The nominally independent State of Burma was proclaimed on 1 August 1943 with Ba Maw as "Naingandaw Adipadi" (head of state) as well as prime minister. The new state quickly declared war on the United Kingdom and the United States, and concluded a Treaty of Alliance with the Empire of Japan. Ba Maw attended the Greater East Asia Conference in Tokyo in November 1943, where he made a speech speaking of how it was the call of Asiatic blood that drew them together into a new era of unity and peace.

Dissatisfied with him, in 1944 a secret clique within the Imperial Japanese Army made up of Kawabe, Isomura and Ozeki decided to hatch a conspiracy to get rid of Ba Maw and replace him with U Nu. The clique contacted U Nu, but U Nu disagreed with the plan and notified Ba Maw of the plot. Although the conspiracy only involved a few officers and not the entire Imperial Japanese Army, this fact fueled Ba Maw's distrust of his Japanese allies. However, he decided to continue the alliance with them until the end of the war because he believed that the priority was to ensure the independence of the Burma from the imperial British Empire.

During their rule, these Japanese soldiers supported the demonstrations in support of the restoration of the monarchy that took place in Shwedagon. According to Ba Maw, Japanese militarists believed that a puppet monarchy similar to Manchukuo would be easier to manage and better serve their interests. The military viewed Taw Phya Gyi, eldest grandson of Thibaw, last king of Burma, as the favorite candidate to occupy the throne. Taw Payagyi was a young man with no experience or aspirations and no political background, so he was just the kind of easy-to-control nominal Head of State they were looking for.

However, the new state failed to found out traitors within them or diplomatic recognition due to the continued presence and activities of the Imperial Japanese Army, the Burma National Army defected to the Allies side, the government collapsed.

Ba Maw fled just ahead of advancing British forces via Thailand to Japan, where he was captured later that year by the American occupational authorities and was held in Sugamo Prison until 1946.

=== Independent Burma ===
Ba Maw was allowed to return to Burma, after Burma became independent of the United Kingdom. When he returned to Burma in August 1946, he was invited by Aung San to join the AFPFL and take an important post in the newly independent government, but Ba refused and reorganized the Mahabama Party as an opposition force. He remained active in politics. He was jailed briefly during 1947, on suspicion of involvement in the assassination of Aung San, but was soon released.

After General Ne Win (1910–2002) took over power in 1963, Ba Maw was again imprisoned (like many prominent Burmese of the period who were detained during the time of Ne Win regime, from the 1960s to the 1980s, his imprisonment was without charge or trial) from about 1965 or 1966 to February 1968. During the period of his imprisonment Ba Maw managed to smuggle out a manuscript of his memoirs of the war years, during less than two of which (from 1 August 1943 to March 1945) he was Head of State (in Burmese naing-ngan-daw-adipadi, lit. 'paramount ruler of the State').

He never again held political office. His book Breakthrough in Burma: Memoirs of a Revolution, 1939–1946, an account of his role during the war years, was published by Yale University Press (New Haven) in 1968. He died in Rangoon on 28 May 1977.

== Family ==
Ba Maw married Khin Ma Ma Maw (13 December 1905 – 1967) on 5 April 1926. The couple went on to have 7 children including Binnya Maw and Tinsa Maw. His daughter Tinsa Maw married Bo Yan Naing of the Thirty Comrades in June 1944.

== Bibliography ==
- John Frank Cady (1958). A History of Modern Burma. Cornell University Press. p. 317. ISBN 9780801400599.
- The Burma we love, by Kyaw Min, India Book House, 1945
- Allen, Louis (1986). Burma: the Longest War 1941-45. J.M. Dent and Sons. ISBN 0-460-02474-4.
- A Burmese heart, by Tinsa Maw-Naing, [Published by] Y.M.V. Han, 2015. [3],315 pages, with black and white illustrations. ISBN 9780996225403.

Preceded by None	Prime Minister of Burma; 1937–1939	Succeeded by Maung Pu
Preceded by Aung San	Prime Minister of Burma; 1943–1945	Succeeded by Paw Tun
