= Saya San =

Burmese Buddhist monk (1876–1931)

- ဆရာစံ
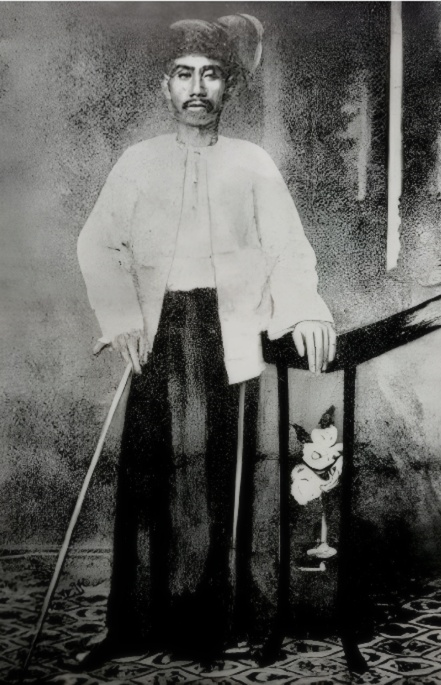
- Born: 24 October 1876; Dabayin, Shwebo District, Kingdom of Myanmar
- Died: 28 November 1931 (aged 55); Tharrawaddy, Pegu Province, British Burma
- Cause of death: Execution by hanging

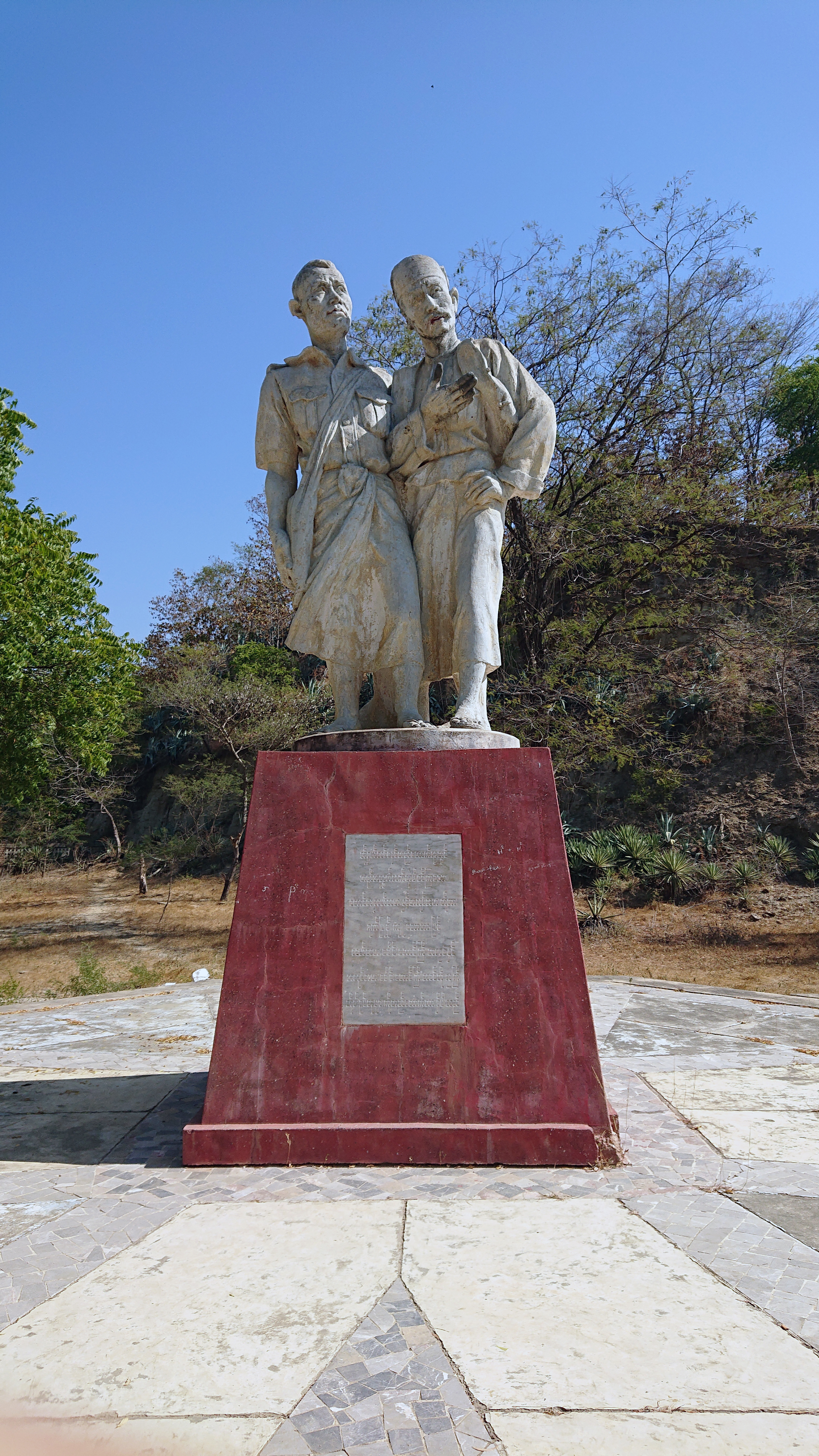
Statue of Saya San and Thakin Po Hla Gyi in Magway Township

Saya San (Burmese: ဆရာစံ, Burmese pronunciation: [sʰəjà sã]; 24 October 1876 – 28 November 1937), born with the name Yar Kyaw, was a Burmese physician and monk who led the Saya San Rebellion (1930–1932) against British colonial rule in Burma (now known as Myanmar). Saya San launched a peasant revolt, proclaiming himself the king and organizing the "Galon Army". The colonial government suppressed the rebellion and Saya San fled to the Shan Hills, but he was captured in August 1931 and executed on 28 November 1931. This uprising is regarded as a pivotal anti-colonial movement in Southeast Asia. Saya San and the rebellion continue to be important subjects of academic study, especially within Asian historical research.

== Early life ==
Saya San was born on 24 October 1876 in Shwebo, a center of monarchist sentiment and the birthplace of the Konbaung dynasty, which ruled Myanmar (Burma) from 1752 until the Third Anglo-Burmese War in 1886. His parents, U Kyaye and Daw Hpet, lived in Thayetkon with their five children. Exposed to Buddhism early on at the local monastery and later at Hpo Hmu monastery, he left for Nga Kaung Inn to pursue mat and basket selling. He married Ma Kay and had two children, Ko Po Thin and Ma Sein. Facing economic hardship, he moved to Moulmein in Lower Burma to look for better opportunities. He worked as a carpenter, fortuneteller, and traditional healer, authoring treatises questioning Western medicine.

Saya San's transition to political activism is unclear, but it is believed he joined the General Council of Burmese Associations (GCBA) in the 1920s. Rising through the ranks, he chaired a commission in 1924 investigating peasant living conditions.

== Saya San Rebellion ==
Also known as the Galon Rebellion and Galon Peasant Rebellion.

=== Anglo-Burmese conflicts ===
In the 9th century, the Tibeto-Burman speaking Burmese began migrating to the Irrawaddy River from present-day Yunnan's Nanzhao Kingdom and then established the Pagan Kingdom in 1057. The prerogative influence of the Pagan dynasty over the region of modern-day Myanmar began to wane in the 13th century. Kublai Khan's Mongol forces invaded northern Burma and sacked the city of Pagan itself, and the kingdom fell in 1287. In the second half of the 16th century, the Taungoo dynasty reunified the country, and founded what was briefly the largest empire in the history of Southeast Asia. In the 18th century, the Konbaung dynasty restored the Burmese hegemony and went to war with its neighbors. The kingdom fought three wars with the British. In 1885, the kingdom was defeated in the Third Anglo-Burmese War, and King Thebaw was deported to India. Eventually, Burma was fully annexed into the British Raj in 1886, but the colonial government authorities immediately faced several uprisings that erupted throughout the former Burmese Kingdom, challenging sovereignty.

By the 1890s, colonial officials had determined that the main pacification campaigns were successful, and they could concentrate on building a socio-economic infrastructure that supported their interest in the vast tea, mineral, and agricultural bounties in the colony. Attached as a province of India, British Burma was subjected to administrative policies established in New Delhi as well as the vast array of procedural structures that characterized the Indian Civil Service. The new dominions were divided into districts and assigned a commissioner with a small support staff. Through the prism and experience of British India, the Burmese people, culture, language, and history were constructed by imperial surveys that now sought to map the new territories. Indigenous healing practices, rituals, folktales, notions of authority, and village life were organized and categorized according to how well the district officer understood what he was observing. When the British government annexed the Kingdom of Burma in 1885–1886, they transferred the Burmese royal throne to a museum in Calcutta. Meanwhile, the Palace of Mandalay was converted into a gentlemen's club, which was seen as offensive by the Burmese. Colonial rule changed the social landscape of ancient Burma in a manner that caused much resentment.

=== Resistance movements before Saya San ===
The colonial government had faced numerous outbreaks of resistance movements throughout 1885–1895. These opposition movements became more intensive and extensive. Some of these rebellions were led by former members of the court, like the Myinzaing Prince son of King Mindon, who continued to wield considerable influence over troops and villagers in provincial centers that had once been in alliance with the throne. Other pockets of resistance were led by local headmen and monks but were limited by size and scope. Furthermore, these minor revolts were often short-lived either due to a lack of support or the overwhelming technical advantage of the colonial government.

In the late 1890s, a small group of Buddhist associations with contemporary forms of organization and structure were founded by lay members in an effort to preserve the religion and its place in society.

In 1906, political organizations such as the Young Men's Buddhist Association (YMBA) came into prominence within Rangoon, drawing young clerks and educated elites into working for changes to colonial society through accepted channels. The YMBA focused on improving social conditions and concentrating on the issue of cultural identity. This would pave the way for the formation of the General Council of Burmese Associations (GCBA), which planned to participate more directly in political protest and demonstrations. In order to engage rural communities, members of the GCBA would travel into the countryside, conducting interviews, collecting data, and filling reports to establish lines of communication with emerging village activists. Saya San would soon after join the GCBA and work in the countryside for more than two years, wherein he became familiar with rural places and had direct connections with peasants.

=== Rebellion ===
In October 1930, in a ceremony held at a pagoda near Rangoon, Saya San was crowned the Thupannaka Galuna Raja. On 21 December 1930, the Galon Raja moved to his palace on Alaungtang Hill in Tharrawaddy, where a royal city, known as Buddharaja Myo, or "Buddhist King's Town", was ceremonially plotted out. The new king disposed of the proper retinue of five queens, four ministers, and four regiments. Assuring his followers that they would be protected by his magical charms and tattoos, Saya San also promised supporters that he would restore the authority of the Burmese monarchy, revitalize the Buddhist religion and expel the British authorities.

On the night of 22 December, the first outbreak occurred in the Tharrawaddy district. The Great Depression of 1930 had a devastating impact on rice prices. Rice, being Burma's most important export commodity, was heavily depended on by the rural population. Thus, Tharrawaddy, like most of Lower Burma, suffered heavily from this. The high population density in Central Burma and the concentration of land ownership in fewer hands resulted in a large number of landless rice farmers. They became increasingly aggrieved with the colonial administration, whom they blamed for the decline of their incomes as rice workers. Thus, the frustrated rural farmers were quick to respond to Saya San's courting appeals, involving a mixture of anti-tax rhetoric, Buddhist prophecies and guarantees of invulnerability.

In a few weeks, it had become clear that the violence in Tharrawaddy had escalated. The colonial government officials in New Delhi were soon asked by their Rangoon counterparts to dispatch armed forces to quell the rebellion. However, the military support did not produce immediate results. The outbreaks continued to spread in neighboring districts, namely, Pyapon, Henzada, Insein, Pegu, Toungoo, Prome, Thayetmyo, Naungcho Township, and the Northern Shan States. Other rebellion leaders such as U Aung Hla, Bo Aung Shwe, and Bo Aung Pe led uprisings in neighboring districts to secure weapons, raid police stations, and attack government representatives.

Within weeks of the first outbreak, Rangoon authorities responded by seeking special emergency power from India. By June 1931, Special Rebellion Commissioner Mr. Booth Gravely was appointed to manage affairs in Burma. In July 1931, the authorities considered the situation so serious that they asked for permission from the government of India to introduce martial law, though their attempt later proved to be unsuccessful.

By August 1931, Saya San was captured. The revolt was defeated with an uncertain number of casualties. By the end of 1932, more than 1,000 rebels were killed and a further 9,000 rebels surrendered or were captured. Saya San and 125 other rebels were hanged and almost 1,400 were sentenced to terms of imprisonment or penal transportation.

==== Timeline of the Saya San Rebellion ====
This is a timeline of the rebellion as outlined by historian Parimal Ghosh.

1930

- 22 December: Rebels strike in the villages around Pashwegyaw. At least two were killed.
- 23 December: Authorities call up 100 military police from Rangoon. Rebels descended on Inywa, killing three.
- 24 December: Rebels raided Weywa, killing two. They also attack a 50-strong military post of military police in Yedaik.
- 30 December: Rebels attempt to dynamite the railway bridge north of Inywa.
- 31 December: 500 rebels challenged military police and were fired upon. Deaths ensue.

1931

- 4 January: Rising spreads into Yamethin district.
- 7 January: A better-organized revolt took place in Dedaye township.
- April: Dacoit gangs attack village headmen and other village officers.
- May: Government beefs up forces in Tharrawaddy and Insein with an additional strength of 728 civil police.
- June: 500 rebels attack the Wettigan police station.
- July: The government published an amnesty offer in Henzada, Prome, Thayetmyo, Insein, and Tharrawaddy to allow 'misguided villagers' to 'return to respectability and freedom by surrendering’. This offer was not open to those who had participated in a dacoity, or murder of officials or villagers.
- 1 July: Rebels open fire on a police party from Taungbyauk.
- 2 July: 150 rebels lost 40 men trying to check government troops crossing the Nulu River.
- 12 July: Decisive showdown near Sinsakan when a party of 80 rebels attacked government troops under Captain Dart.
- End July: Three of his followers are arrested, and Saya San retreats to Shan territory.
- August: News emerges about two rebel armies called the ‘Tiger’ and the ‘Lion’ in the Paungde sub-division. Government accounts described them as just two dacoit gangs. At this time there is also news of ‘widespread disloyalty’ in the villages.
- 1 August: The Emergency Powers Ordinance 1931 was promulgated, and effectively muzzled the press. The government version of the rebellion was given full exposure, and leaflets, posters, and handbills were broadcast.
- 2 August: Saya San is arrested by Hsipaw State officials in Hsumhsai with five others. Saya San's movement is on the decline, and government pressure is increasing almost everywhere.
- 10 September to 13 October: Two columns were set up in the Minhla township of Thayetmyo. These columns were composed of detachments from the 14th Field Company and troops of mounted military police. This force was armed with rifles, machine guns, and grenades. They visited almost every village in the township. At this time, the government also began to put relatives and sympathisers of the rebels into concentration camps.
- 23 September: A ‘cult of the sun and the moon’ led by two leaders Saya Chit and Yin Gyi Aung attacked Tazaung village, killing one person. Headmen of the neighbouring Shweindon village arrived to fight, shooting seven rebels and catching twenty others.
- October: Several important leaders of the ‘Lions’ were killed, some were arrested, and some surrendered. This put the group under pressure. The ‘Tigers’ also struggled.
- 24 October: The ‘Tiger's camp was surrounded by the military. They fought, leaving fifteen of their people dead, including a number of their leaders.
- 28 November: Saya San is executed.

==== Galon Raja ====
Saya San took the name of the Thupannaka Galon Raja (King). This name could be understood in three dimensions within the Burmese context.

The galon is a well-recognized figure in the literature of Hindu-Buddhist Southeast Asia. Galon was a fabulous bird of Hindu mythology. It is often depicted in combat with the Nāga. This cosmic battle between galon and nāga would come to represent ideas about the power of nature, the dualities of the world, and the challenges of human conditions.

First, after the establishment of British rule, the Nāga was generally recognized as the symbol for the British, while the Galon stood for Burma. In one sense, the Galon acted as an unofficial symbol for anti-British sentiments in Burma, as the Galon was the ultimate vanquisher of the Nāga.

Secondly, The Galon-Nāga symbolism also had other meanings. In Eastern mythology, the Galon represents the sun's force or solar energy, in natural opposition to the liquid quality of earthly waters. The Nāga is an earth symbol that, in its embodiment in serpentine form, partakes of the magical symbolic properties of liquids. The liquid of the serpent is especially fascinating because it is a poison. The Galon is the killer of serpents, and thus the possessor of supernatural power against all forms of lethal poison. Therefore, it is not surprising that most Burmans regarded certain tattoos as effective protection against snakebite. Perhaps at some time in history, tattoo dyes or needles had some genuine medicinal properties. On this count we can only speculate, but, in any case, it was a well-entrenched article of Burmese belief. Thus the Galon itself was a symbol or effecter of invulnerability.

The Galon has a third vital symbolic role: in most depictions, the Galon is a vehicle for Vishnu, one of three great deities of the Brahmanic universe. Therefore, the Galon is also regarded an omnipotent protector.

== Analysis ==
Discussions about the Saya San Rebellion often revolve around its causes and characteristics. Scholars have studied it and produced several interpretations in order to locate Saya San's position in Burmese history and examine the rebellion from different aspects.

On the eve of the rebellion, the leading Burmese newspaper, Thu-ri-ya (The Sun), published the article "A Warning to the British Government", which spoke of Burma as a "keg of dynamite" that could explode at any time.

The colonial government had recorded the event in a report titled The Origin and Causes of the Burma Rebellion (1930-1932), which was published in 1934. It became a fundamental resource for over eighty years. According to the report: "As regards the causes it is well known: (1) that the Burman is by nature restless and excitable; (2) that in spite of a high standard of literacy, the Burman peasantry are incredibly ignorant and superstitious…" Thus, to the authorities, the rebellion could be explained with the framework of superstition. In addition, it rejected any political causes or responsibility for the rebellion.

D.G.E. Hall, one of the pioneers of writing history on Southeast Asia and a historian on Burmese history, disagrees with the reports’ finding. In terms of the cause of the rebellion, he posited political factors rather than economic ones. However, he also recognized the economic discontent present in Burma. While some scholars have suggested that economic hardship was at the heart of the revolts, others have suggested that initiating a new Golden Age of Buddhism was an important reason. After the independence of Burma, historians tend to analyze the rebellion from more diverse perspectives.

For those Burmese historians, Saya San was portrayed as an early nationalist hero. These interpretations stressed economic factors, which were the cause of popular dissatisfaction. Differing from the established discourse, the economic grievances could form the base of the movement. The movement was not aimless, but rather rational and justifiable.

John Cady is the first Western historian to term the rebellion the "Saya San rebellion". He used a vast amount of British documents, including parliamentary papers and police reports, to create a narrative by recognizing the localized form of political expression. In his book A history of modern Burma, Cady wrote that "it was a deliberately planned affair based on traditional Burmese political and religious patterns".

There is also research that focuses on the economic perspective. Written a generation later and infused with the intellectual currents that informed both peasant studies and Southeast Asian studies, Michael Adas' The Burma Delta (1974), James C. Scott's The Moral Economy of the Peasant: Rebellion and Subsistence in Southeast Asia (1976), and Ian Brown's A Colonial Economy in Crisis: Burma's Rice Cultivators and the World Depression of the 1930s (2005) provided in-depth analyses into the economic conditions underlying the uprisings in the 1930s. For these scholars (like their earlier Burmese colleagues), the traditional vocabulary of the rebellion was less a factor in the cause of the insurgency than the unforgiving demands of the rational state's economy.

E. Manuel Sarkisyanz's Buddhist Background of the Burmese Revolution employed the idea of the Buddhist millenarian to examine the Saya San rebellion. It represented a transition from those earlier studies which trapped in a context of colonialism or nationalism to those discourses that paid attention to the cultural ideas within a more indigenous context.

From the 1970s onwards, "autonomous history" becomes the tendency of historiography, which reconstructed those historical figures and events by analyzing indigenous culture from the local people's point of view. Another important book regarding Saya San is Michael Adas’s Prophets of Rebellion: Millenarian Protest Movements Against the European Colonial Order. Adas emphasized that a ‘Prophetic leader’ has the ability to start up a millenarian movement. He also provides four other examples to justify his theory in bigger colonial situations.

Maitrii Aung-Thwin's book, The Return of the Galon King: history, law, and Rebellion in colonial Burma, offers a critical assessment of the history and impact of the narrative of the Saya San revolt, an event taken as formative for Burmese history and studies of peasant rebellion worldwide.

While those interpretations have emerged, scholarship has raised many questions about Saya San's role in the revolt, such as if the colonial government falsified and overstated Saya San's role in the revolt so as to make his execution seem more meaningful than it actually was. Several details of the trial, including a diary produced by the police that outlines Saya San's plan, are not considered to be trustworthy.

=== Legacy ===
The Saya San rebellion left thousands of people dead by the time it had concluded, making it one of the most violent anti-colonial movements in Southeast Asia in the 20th century. However, Saya San is still regarded as a national hero, standing as a figure for national unity and having his face placed on the 90 Kyat Burmese banknote.

The Saya San rebellion demonstrates how contesting historiographies have an effect on the production of history. Because the colonial narrative formed the dominant discourse of the period, that discourse was able to control the narratives based on the archival data, despite being biased and framed from the colonial perspective as opposed to competing narratives.

Future repercussions of the rebellion were strong. Two years after Saya San's capture, the movement still continued. Today, Saya San evokes sentiments of nationalism and patriotism. Despite him existing in the modern period, post-colonial narratives still continue to focus on the superstitious aspects such as the tattoos and amulets that he and his people used.

== Bibliography ==
- Maurice Collis, Trials in Burma (London, 1934).
