= Paw Tun =

Burmese politician and former prime minister

Sir Paw Tun (c. 1883 – 28 February 1953), also known as U Paw Tun, Maung Paw Tun, Sa Paw Tun, and Joseph Porter, was a Burmese administrator, barrister and politician who served as premier of British Burma in 1942, following the dismissal and arrest of U Saw until the evacuation of the Burmese government to India. A moderate nationalist and leading figure in pre-war Burmese politics, he was eventually displaced by the Anti-Fascist People's Freedom League, led by Aung San.

== Biography ==
=== Early life and career ===
The son of U Rai Phaw of Akyab, U Paw Tun was headmaster of the Methodist High and Government High School, Rangoon from 1904 to 1908 and a district official from 1912 to 1925, as a member of the subordinate civil service of Burma. He proceeded to England to read for the English bar, was admitted to the Middle Temple in November 1921, and was called to the bar in June 1923. Returning Burma, he began to practice law in Rangoon, and became President of the Rangoon Municipal Council and a member of the Legislative Council from 1925.

In the early 1930s, U Paw Tun was the leader of the Swaraj Party after the death of U Toke Gyi. An opponent of Burma's separation from British India, he was a member of the Anti-Separation League, then followed Chit Hlaing when the League split in two. He contested the 1936 Burmese general election with the Hlaing-Myat-Paw GCBA coalition. He joined the first post-separation Burmese government as Minister of Home and Judicial Affairs from 1937 to 1938, also acting as chief minister in 1937. From 1939 to 1941, he was Minister of Lands and Revenue. In 1939, he was appointed to the Burma Defence Council. His ability to keep office despite changes of government earned him a reputation as a Burmese Vicar of Bray.

=== Premiership and exile in India ===
In 1941, he was acting premier when U Saw was arrested abroad for secretly communicating with Japan. U Paw Tun was asked by Sir Reginald Dorman-Smith, the Governor of Burma, to form a new government, becoming prime minister in January 1942. When the Burmese government was evacuated to India following the Japanese invasion later that year, U Paw Tun followed the Governor to Simla along with another minister, Sir Htoon Aung Gyaw. When the Governor assumed the powers of government under Section 139 of the Burma Act, Paw Tun ceased to be a minister and instead became one of Dorman-Smith's advisers, to whom he was by then closely associated. During the war, he was a strong supporter of the Allied cause, which he thought linked to the cause of Burmese freedom.

=== Post-war ===
In 1945, he returned to Burma with the Governor and became Home and Judicial Minister in the new Executive Council as well as its head, over the objections of the Anti-Fascist People's Freedom League (AFPFL). Sir Paw Tun in turn pushed for the arrest of Aung San, the leader of the AFPFL, for the murder of a village henchman during the war. The order for his arrest was issued, then countermanded by London. Unable to compete with Aung Sang and AFPFL despite his belief that he could form the necessary political front, Paw Tun was dropped from the new Executive Council in 1946, formed by the new Governor, Sir Hubert Rance.

After Burma's independence, he was one of the organizers of the Union of Burma League, a party which contested the 1951–52 Burmese general election.

A recipient of the Ahmudan gaung Tazeik ya Min medal, Paw Tun was knighted in 1938.

=== Family ===
Sir Paw Tun's second wife was Sarah Elisabeth Jewitt, daughter of Dr E. H. Jewitt, of Cleveland, Ohio; they had one daughter. Lady Paw Tun ran a kindergarten for European and Burmese children in Rangoon. She died on 10 June 1965 in Azamgarh, India. Their daughter, Florence Paw Tun (died 1981), was married to the American diplomat Herbert D. Spivack.

== Assessments ==
Robert H. Taylor describes Sir Paw Tun as "one of the most adept of pre-war politicians. His most important political role was that of go-between among the British, Indian, and Burmese political communities." However, Taylor also notes that "it was generally conceded that he had no popular base, and had he had to stand for election in 1942, he would not have been re-elected."
