= Chit Hlaing =

Burmese politician (1879–1952)

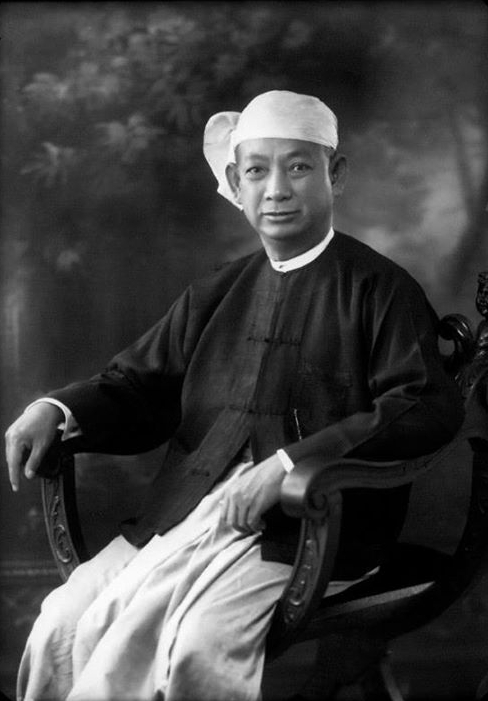

Member of the Pyithu Hluttaw
- In office 1948–1952

Personal details
- Born: 1879 Moulmein, British Burma
- Died: 31 October 1952 (aged 72–73) Rangoon, Burma
- Occupation: Politician and lawyer

Chit Hlaing (Burmese: ချစ်လှိုင်, 1879 – 31 October 1952) was a notable Burmese politician. During his time, he was called a Burmese king without a crown, and was popular in rural Burma. He was imprisoned when the British Crown Prince of Wales (who later became King Edward VIII) visited Burma in 1921.

He was born in Moulmein (now Mawlamyaing), the son of rich teak merchant U Thar Nyin. At age 20, he left for Britain to study law. After he graduated, he returned to Moulmein to help found the Y.M.B.A. (Young Men's Buddhist Association). In 1911 he unsuccessfully defended U Dhammaloka, the "Irish Buddhist", in his trial for sedition. He also helped fund the GCBA, acting as its chairman for a number of years, to such an extent that he had become a debt fugitive by 1932. In 1937, as president of the Burmese House, Chit Hlaing attended the ceremony of King George VI's coronation in England. He was elected president of the law council and consultant of the Burmese Chancellor during World War II. After the war, he was elected a Member of Parliament until his death in 1952 in Rangoon.

His sister Hnin Mya was the first woman to become a member of the Legislative Council.
