= Legislative Council of Burma =

Historical legislative body

Type
- Type: Unicameral

History
- Founded: 1897
- Disbanded: 1936
- Preceded by: Nyilarkhan of Konbaung Dynasty
- Succeeded by: Legislature of Burma
- Seats: 9 (1897–1923); 103 (1923–1936)

Elections
- Last election: 1932 Burmese general election

Meeting place
- Rangoon, British Burma

The Legislative Council of Burma was the legislative body of British Burma from 1897 to 1936.

== Establishment ==
It was established in 1897 as an advisory council to the British colonial governor, the Lieutenant-Governor of Burma, in drafting legislation for Burma. The Legislative Council was initially an appointed body, established as a nine-member council consisting of four officials and five nominated non-officials. Its membership, which increased from nine to thirty members, predominantly represented foreign commercial interests. Prior to its establishment, Burmese laws were made in India, whereby laws drafted by the local administration in Burma were submitted to the Legislative Council of India for approval. After the passage of such laws, they were consented to by the Governor-General-in-Council and put into effect through publication within the Burma Gazette.

== Restructuring ==
On 2 January 1923, with the enactment of the Montagu–Chelmsford Reforms (which granted British India dyarchy constitution, giving Burma a limited measure of self-rule), the Council was recast as a partially elected body. The new Legislative Council consisted of 103 seats, 80 filled by election, 8 by nomination of non-officials, 13 by nomination of officials, and 2 by members of the Governor's Executive Council ex-officio. The 80 elected seats were divided as follows: 22 to urban constituencies in 8 towns, with 8 of them to the Burmese Indian community; 49 to rural constituencies in 31 districts, with 5 to the Karen; and the remaining given to special constituencies like Rangoon University and various chambers of commerce.

Elections were held in 1922, 1925 and 1928. Burmese nationalists, organized by the General Council of Burmese Associations, boycotted elections to the Legislative Council, and under 7% of the electorate voted in the 1922 elections. Turnout continued to be low: just over 16% in 1925, and 18% in 1928.

== Presidents of Legislative Council ==
Name	Took office	Left office	Notes
Sir Frank McCarthy	February 1923	1925	Died in office
Sir Robert Sydney Giles	1925	1927	
Sir Oscar de Glanville	1927	1930	
U Pu 'Tharrawaddy'	1930	1932	
Chit Hlaing	1932	1932	
Sir Oscar de Glanville	1932	1935	
Chit Hlaing	1935	1936	
