= General Council of Burmese Associations =

Burmese nationalist organisation, political successor of YMBA

The General Council of Burmese Associations (GCBA), also known as the Great Burma Organisation (Burmese: မြန်မာအသင်းချုပ်ကြီး; Myanma Ahthinchokgyi), was a political party in Burma.

== History ==
The GCBA was formed at the 1920 conference of the Young Men's Buddhist Association following the student strike earlier in the year and Burma's exclusion from British proposals for limited self-government in Indian provinces. Its leadership included Chit Hlaing, U Pu and U Kyaw Dun. The new party held rallies to pressurise the British to extend the self-government plans to Burma. A proposal known as the Craddock Plan to give ethnic minorities separate representation was opposed by the GCBA, which saw it as an attempt at divide and rule.

In 1922 the British agreed to extend the Indian system to Burma, and elections were scheduled for November. However, this caused a split in the GCBA, with the majority calling for a boycott and others calling for participation in the elections. This eventually led to 21 dissidents leaving to form the 21 Party, which emerged as the largest faction in the Legislative Council following the elections.

The GCBA split again in the build-up to the 1925 elections due to differences over another boycott, as well as the organisation's finances and the role of monks. Dissidents left to form the U Chit Hlaing Faction, which subsequently splintered into the Home Rule Party and the Hlaing-Myat-Paw GCBA. The rump of the GCBA became known as the Soe Thein GCBA, named after its leader U Soe Thein.

Another split occurred in 1929 when the organisation was split into the Ye-U group led by U Su and the Thetpan Sayadaws led by U Soe Thein. The latter collapsed in the early 1930s and many of its members joined other parties to contest elections. By 1932 the GCBA was effectively defunct, although its name continued to be used by some parties, including the United GCBA established in 1936.
