= Young Men's Buddhist Association (Burma) =

First Civil Society Organization in Myanmar

- ဗုဒ္ဓဘာသာကလျာဏယုဝအသင်း
- Flag
- Abbreviation: YMBA
- Formation: 1906
- Founder: U Ba Pe, Doctor Ba Yin, Sir Maung Gyi
- Founded at: Yangon (Rangoon)
- Purpose: Current: Ultranationalism; Buddhist nationalism Historical: Anti-colonialism; Burmese nationalism
- Location: Yangon, Yangon Region, Myanmar
- Chairman: U Myint Aung Than

The Young Men's Buddhist Association (YMBA; Burmese: ဗုဒ္ဓဘာသာကလျာဏယုဝအသင်း; Pali: Buddha Bhāsā Kalyāṇa Yuva) is a Buddhist civil society organisation in Myanmar.

== History ==
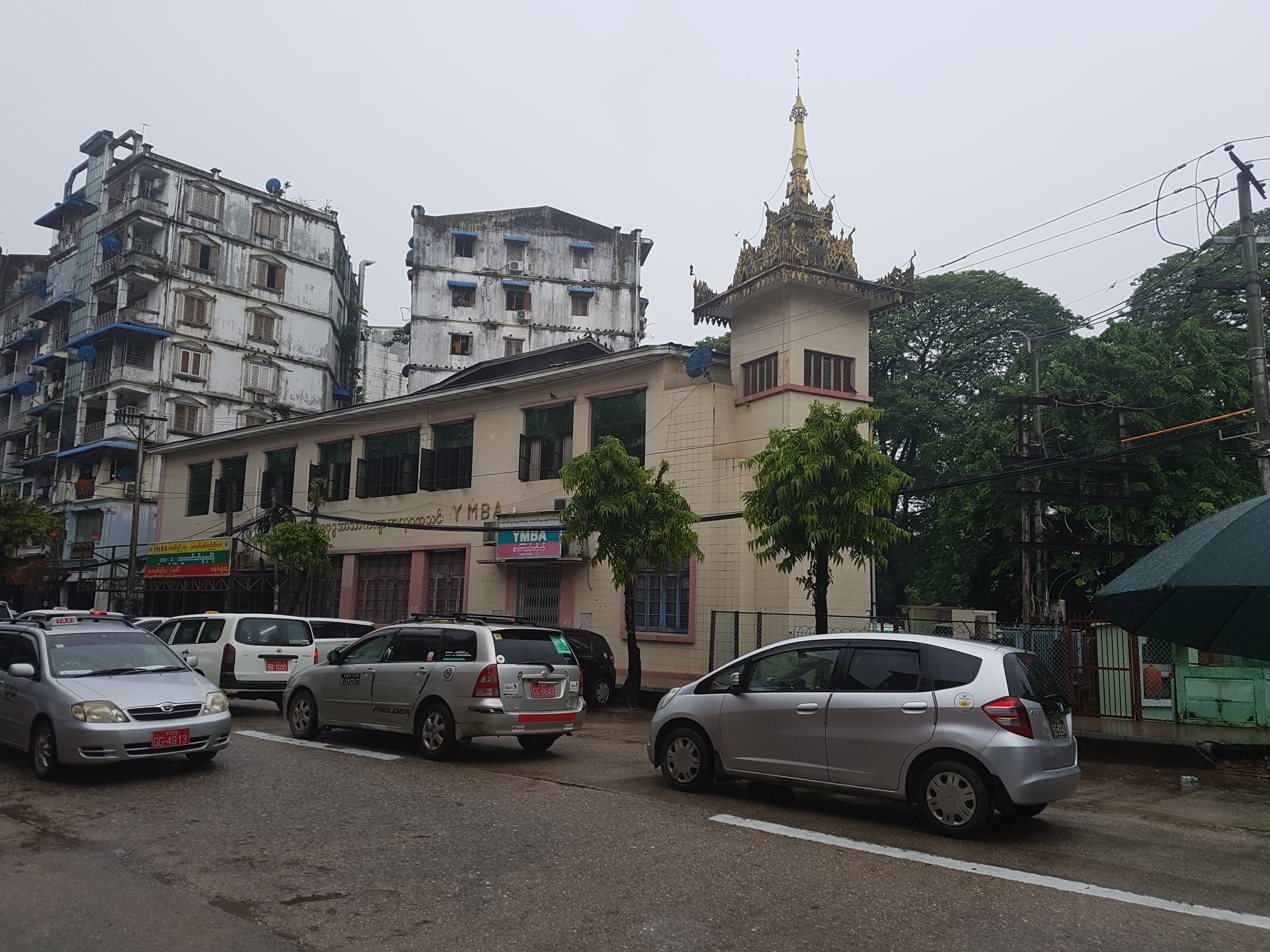
YMBA Building in Yangon

The YMBA was founded in Rangoon in 1906 as a federation of lay Buddhist groups dating back to 1898, with prominent founders including Ba Pe, Sir Maung Gyi and Dr. Ba Yin. It was modelled on the Young Men's Buddhist Association founded in Ceylon in 1898, and was created to preserve the Buddhist-based culture in Burma against the backdrop of British colonialism including the incorporation of Burma into India.

The YMBA started its first open campaign against British rule in 1916, and after many protests obtained a ruling that abbots could impose dress codes on all visitors to Buddhists monasteries.

The organization split in 1918 when older members insisted that it should remain apolitical, whilst younger members sought to enter the political sphere, sending a delegation to India to meet the Viceroy and Secretary of State to request the separation of Burma from India. Further lobbying delegations were sent to London in 1919 and 1920. Following its key involvement in the 1920 student strike, the most nationalist elements of the YMBA broke off and formed a political party known as the General Council of Burmese Associations, whilst a senior faction later formed the Independent Party. After Burma was granted independence in 1948, YMBA pledged to exit from politics.

YMBA returned to the political scene in 2019, closely aligning itself with the Myanmar military and its proxy political party, the Union Solidarity and Development Party. In October 2019, YMBA bestowed an honorary title, the Mahāmaṅgalādhammajotikadhaja, on Min Aung Hlaing, the military's commander-in-chief, and granted him the role of permanent patron. In February 2020, YMBA granted Min Aung Hlaing its highest honorary title, the Aggamahāmaṅgalājotikadhaja. The granting of honorary titles was heavily criticised on social media.

Following the 2021 Myanmar coup d'état in February 2021, YMBA became the first civil organisation to issue a public statement supporting the Tatmadaw. Political observers have speculated that YMBA has ambitions to succeed the Patriotic Association of Myanmar, which was banned by the civilian-led government in 2017.

== Membership ==
In August 2020, YMBA had 30,000 members. Members pay annual dues, which are discounted for military officers.

== Activities ==
The organization has founded multiple schools. YMBA operates Dhamma training classes and Dhamma summer schools nation-wide, through its township chapters. The schools have been criticised for stoking ethnoreligious tensions, and promoting toxic nationalism and military propaganda.
