= Burma Legislature =

Colonial legislature of British Burma from 1936 to independence

Type
- Type: Bicameral
- Houses: Senate; House of Representatives

History
- Founded: 1936
- Disbanded: 1942 (de facto)
- Preceded by: Legislative Council of Burma
- Succeeded by: Constituent Assembly of Burma
- Seats: 168; 36 (Senate); 132 (House of Representatives)

Elections
- Last election: 1936 Burmese general election

Meeting place
- Rangoon, British Burma

The Burma Legislature was the legislative body of British Burma from 1936 to 1947. As an elected body, the Legislature of Burma was a bicameral legislature consisting of the 36-seat Senate and the 132-seat House of Representatives.

== Establishment ==
The Government of India Act 1935 separated Burma from British India as of 1 April 1937, and created a 36-seat Senate and a 132-seat House of Representatives.

== Presidents of the Senate ==
Name	Took office	Left office	Notes
Maung Gyee	16 March 1937	1940	
Sir Joseph Augustus Maung Gyi	30 August 1940	1942 - 1943?	

== Speakers of the House of Representatives ==
Name	Took office	Left office	Notes
Chit Hlaing	12 February 1937	1941	
Saw Sydney Loo-Nee	1941	1941	
Chit Hlaing	26 March 1941	1942 - 1943?	
?	1945	1946	
Thakin U Nu	1946	1946	Speaker of the Constituent Assembly
Chit Hlaing	1947	1947	President of the Legislative Council

Bandoola U Sein was President of the State Assembly of Japanese-sponsored State of Burma.

== Notable legislation ==
In 1938, the Legislature of Burma attempted to remedy the dispossession of rural Burmese farmers who were displaced by Indians, in particular, the Chettiars, by passing the Tenancy Act, Land Purchase Act, and Land Alienation Act. The Tenancy Act intended to safeguard tenants from eviction and to fix fair rents, while the Land Purchase Act allowed the government to purchase large swathes of land owned by non-agriculturalists to be resold on a tenancy basis to genuine farmers. In 1938, the Legislature passed into law the progressive University Act.
