= British rule in Burma =

British colonial rule from 1824 to 1948

Burma မြန်မာနိုင်ငံတော် (Burmese)
- Division of the Bengal Presidency (1824–1862); Province of India (1862–1937); Crown colony of the United Kingdom (1937–1948)
- 1824–1948
- Flag (1939–1948) Badge (1939–1948)

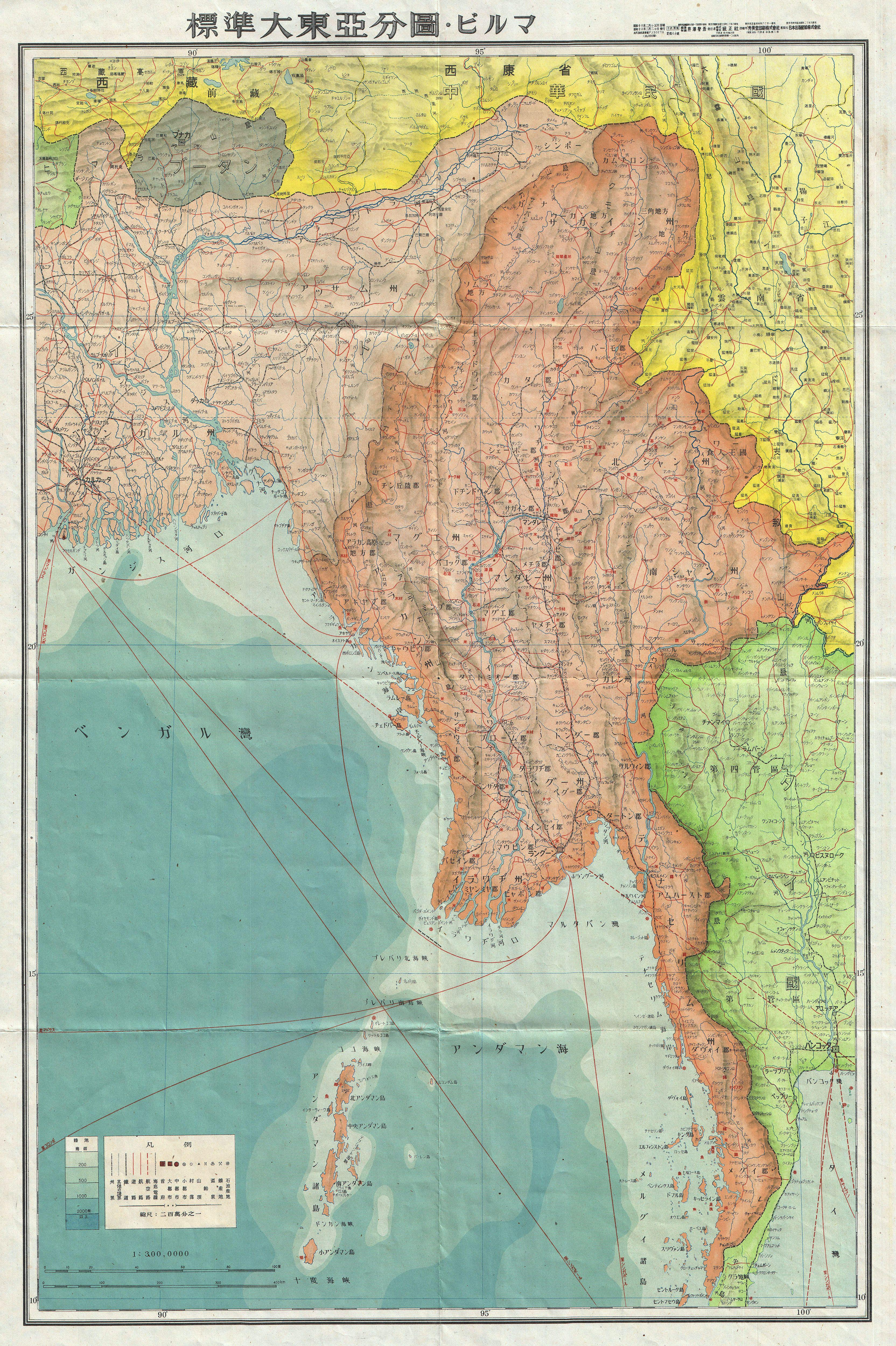
- A Japanese Map of British Burma in 1943

Anthem
- "God Save the King/Queen"
- Capital: Moulmein (1826–1852); Rangoon (1853–1942; 1945–1948)
- Demonym: Indian (until 1937); Burmese (after 1937)
- Population
  - 1901 census: 10,490,624
- Government
- Monarch
  - 1862–1901: Victoria
  - 1901–1910: Edward VII
  - 1910–1936: George V
  - 1936: Edward VIII
  - 1936–1948: George VI
- Governor
  - 1862–1867 (first): Sir Arthur Purves Phayre (Note: as Chief Commissioner)
  - 1946–1948 (last): Sir Hubert Rance
- Legislature: Legislative Council of Burma (1897–1936); Legislature of Burma (1936–1947)
  - Upper house: Senate
  - Lower house: House of Representatives
- Historical era: Colonial era
  - First Anglo-Burmese War: 5 March 1824
  - Establishment as Burma Division: 24 February 1826
  - Establishment as Burma Province: 31 January 1862
  - Annexation of Upper Burma: 1 January 1886
  - Separation from British India and Establishment as Crown Colony of the United Kingdom: 1 April 1937 (Government of Burma Act)
  - Japanese occupation of Burma: 1942–1945
  - Independence: 4 January 1948
Preceded by
1824–1885: Konbaung Dynasty
1945: State of Burma
Succeeded by
1942: Japanese occupation
1943: State of Burma
Saharat Thai Doem
1948: Union of Burma
- Today part of: Myanmar

British colonial rule in Burma lasted from 1824 to 1948, from the successive three Anglo-Burmese Wars through the creation of Burma as a province of British India to the establishment of an independently administered colony separate from British colonial India, and finally independence. The region under British control was known as British Burma, and officially known as Burma (Burmese: မြန်မာနိုင်ငံတော်) (Note: MLCTS: Mranmanuingngamtau, lit. 'Great Country of the Mranma or State of Myanmar') from 1886.

Some portions of Burmese territories, including Arakan and Tenasserim, were annexed by the British after their victory in the First Anglo-Burmese War; Lower Burma was annexed in 1852 after the Second Anglo-Burmese War. These territories were designated as a chief commissioner's province known as British Burma in 1862.

After the Third Anglo-Burmese War in 1885, Upper Burma was annexed, and the following year, the province of Burma in British ruled India was created, becoming a major province (a lieutenant-governorship) in 1897. This arrangement lasted until 1937, when Burma was separated from British-ruled India and made a separate Crown Colony administered by the Burma Office under the Secretary of State for India and Burma. British rule was disrupted during the Japanese occupation of much of the country during World War II. Burma achieved independence from British rule on 4 January 1948.

Burma is sometimes referred to as "the Scottish Colony" owing to the considerable role played by Scots in colonising and running the country, one of the most notable being Sir James Scott. It was also known for the important role played by Indian immigrants in managing and administering the colony, especially while it was still part of British India; some historians have called this a case of co-colonialism, drawing attention to the rise of anti-Indian nationalism in Burma.

== Before the British conquest ==
Because of its location, trade routes of Southeast Asia passed through the country, keeping Burma wealthy through trade, although self-sufficient agriculture was still the basis of the economy. Indian merchants travelled along the coasts and rivers (especially the Irrawaddy River) throughout the regions where the majority of Burmese lived, resulting in the assimilation of many Indians into the Bamar population. As Burma had been one of the first Southeast Asian countries to adopt Buddhism on a large scale, it continued under the British as the officially patronised religion of most of the population.

The ruling Konbaung dynasty practised a tightly centralised form of government. The king was the chief executive with the final say on all matters, but he could not make new laws and could only issue administrative edicts. The country had two codes of law, the Dhammathat and the Hluttaw, the centre of government, was divided into three branches—fiscal, executive, and judicial. In theory, the king was in charge of all of the Hluttaw, but none of his orders got put into place until the Hluttaw approved them, thus checking his power. Further dividing the country, provinces were ruled by governors, who were appointed by the Hluttaw, and villages were ruled by hereditary headmen approved by the king.

== Arrival of the British ==
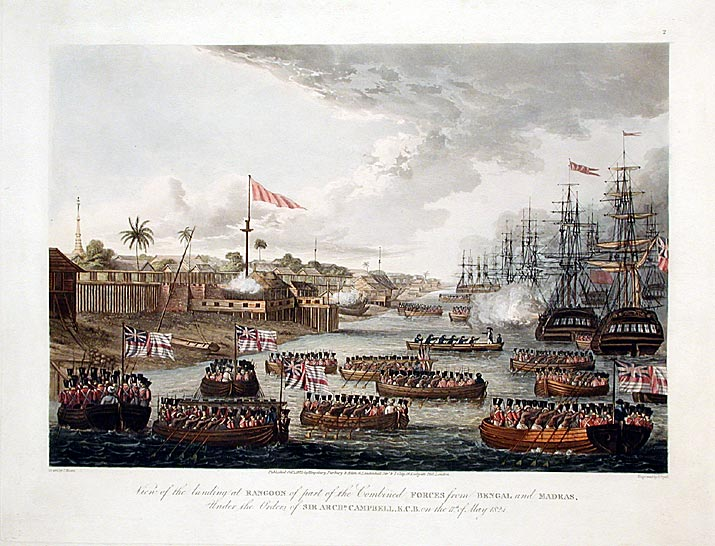
British naval forces entering the harbour of Rangoon in May 1824

Conflict began between Burma and the British when the Konbaung dynasty decided to expand into Arakan in the state of Assam, close to British-held Chittagong in India. This led to the First Anglo-Burmese War (1824–26). The British dispatched a large seaborne expedition that took Rangoon without a fight in 1824. In Danuphyu, at the Ayeyarwaddy Delta, Burmese General Maha Bandula was killed and his armies routed. Burma was forced to cede Assam and other northern provinces. The 1826 Treaty of Yandabo formally ended the First Anglo-Burmese War, the longest and the most expensive war in the history of British India. Fifteen thousand European and Indian soldiers died, together with an unknown number of Burmese army and civilian casualties. The campaign cost the British between 5 and 13 million pounds sterling (between 18 and 48 billion in 2020 U.S. dollars) which led to an economic crisis in British India in 1833.

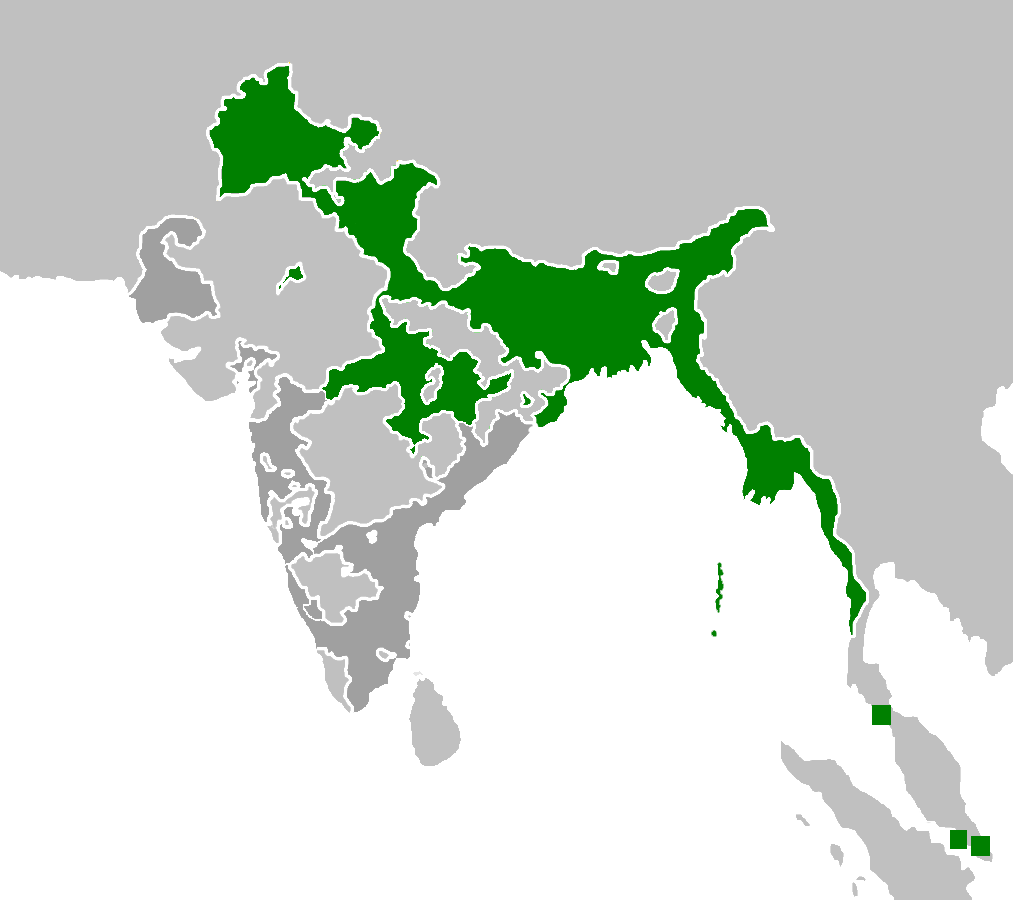
The Bengal Presidency of British India in 1852, with the coastal areas of Burma and the Straits Settlements forming part of it

In 1852, the Second Anglo-Burmese War was provoked by the British, who sought the teak forests in Lower Burma as well as a port between Calcutta and Singapore. After 25 years of peace, British and Burmese fighting started afresh and continued until the British occupied all of Lower Burma. The British were victorious in this war and, as a result, obtained access to the teak, oil, and rubies of their newly conquered territories.

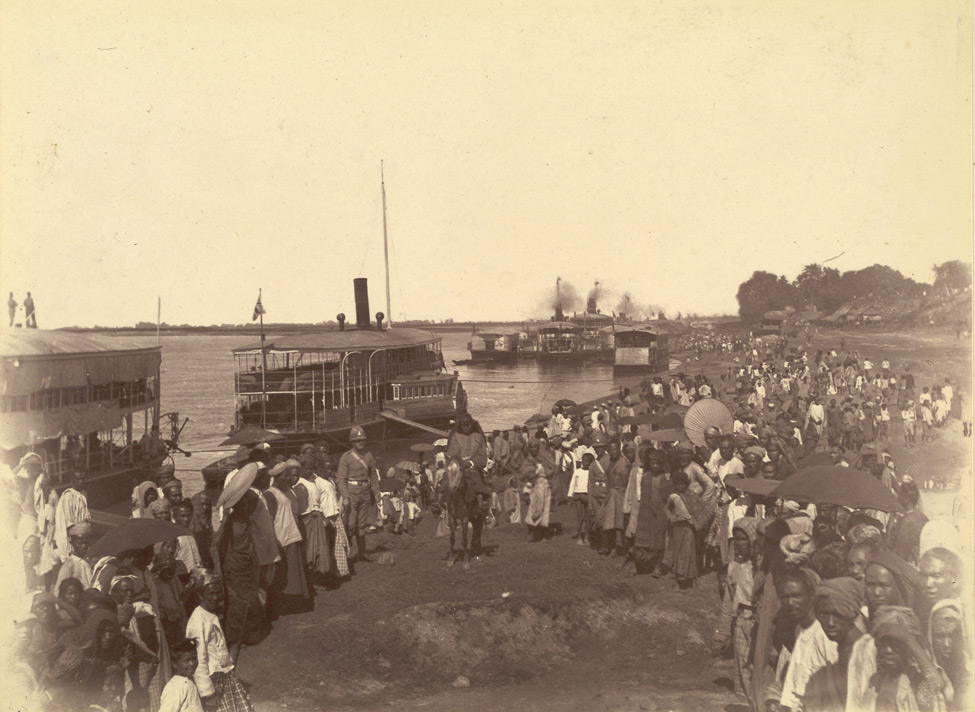
Photograph of the arrival of British forces in Mandalay on 28 November 1885 at the end of the Third Anglo-Burmese War.

In Upper Burma, the still unoccupied part of the country, King Mindon had tried to adjust to the thrust of imperialism. He enacted administrative reforms and made Burma more receptive to foreign interests. But the British initiated the Third Anglo-Burmese War, which lasted less than two weeks during November 1885. The British government justified their actions by claiming that the last independent king of Burma, Thibaw Min, was a tyrant and that he was conspiring to give France more influence in the country. British troops entered Mandalay on 28 November 1885. Thus, after three wars gaining various parts of the country, the British occupied all the area of present-day Myanmar, making the territory a province of British India on 1 January 1886.

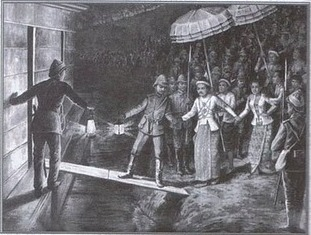
In this rendering, British officers take King Thibaw onto a steamship en route to exile in India. He would never see Burma again.

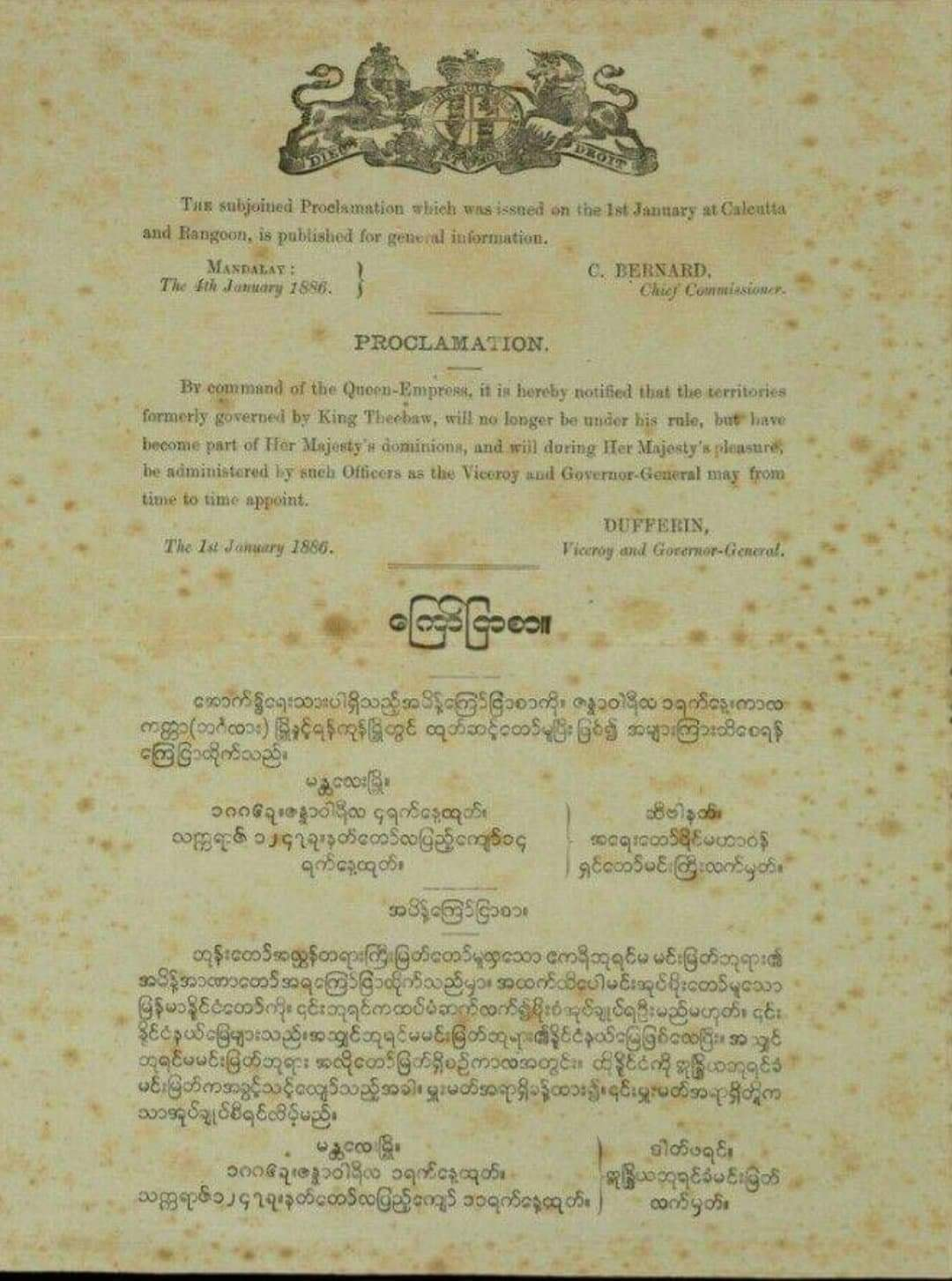
"Proclamation" of the annexation of Burma into the British Empire in English and Burmese, published in Mandalay on 4 January 1886

== Early British rule ==
Burmese armed resistance continued sporadically for several years, and the British commander had to coerce the High Court of Justice to continue to function. Though war officially ended after only a couple of weeks, resistance to colonial conquest continued in northern Burma until 1890, with the British choosing to systematically destroy villages and appoint new officials to quash the liberation movement.

Traditional Burmese society was drastically altered by the demise of the monarchy and the separation of religion and state. Intermarriage between Europeans and Burmese gave birth to an indigenous Eurasian community known as the Anglo-Burmese who would come to dominate the colonial society, hovering above the Burmese but below the British.

After Britain took over all of Burma, they continued to send tribute to Chinese officials to avoid offending them, but this unknowingly lowered the status they held in Chinese minds. It was agreed at the Burma convention in 1886 that China would recognise Britain's occupation of Upper Burma, while the British government continued the Burmese payment of tribute every ten years to Peking.

=== Administration ===
The British controlled their new province through direct rule in the Burmese heartland, making many changes to the previous governmental structure. For example, Burmans lived under a British-style legal code and were governed by a British-style civil service. Areas outside the central plains were governed indirectly through their traditional structures. In this way, ethnic differences between the majority Burmans of the central plain and the ethnic minorities in the hills were exacerbated. This was part of the British colonial practice of "divide and rule". The monarchy was abolished, King Thibaw sent into exile, and religion and state separated. This was particularly harmful because the Buddhist monks, collectively known as the Sangha, were strongly dependent on the sponsorship of the monarchy. At the same time, the monarchy was given legitimacy by the Sangha, and monks as representatives of Buddhism gave the public the opportunity to understand national politics to a greater degree.

The British Raj also implemented a secular education system. The colonial Government of British India, which was given control of the new colony, founded secular schools, teaching in both English and Burmese, while also encouraging Christian missionaries to visit and found schools. In both of these types of schools, Buddhism and traditional Burmese culture was frowned upon.

The Christian missionaries had success in converting some of the minority ethnic groups to Christianity, particularly the Chin, Kachin, Karen and Karenni. Furthermore, missionaries built hospitals and schools, which, in the minority ethnic areas, spurred the development of writing systems for their languages, which allowed for the promotion of social progress, education and culture.

The British abolished chattel slavery in Burma. This was however a gradual process. In the report of slavery in Burma and India to the Temporary Slavery Commission in the 1920s, the British India Office stated that the slaves in Assam Bawi in Lushai Hills were now secured the right to buy their freedom; that chattel slavery still existed in parts of Assam with weak British control; that the British negotiated with Hukawng Valley in Upper Burma to end slavery there, where the British provided loans for slaves to buy their freedom; that all slave trade had been banned, and that slavery in Upper Burma was expected to be effectively phased out by 1926.

== Administrative divisions ==
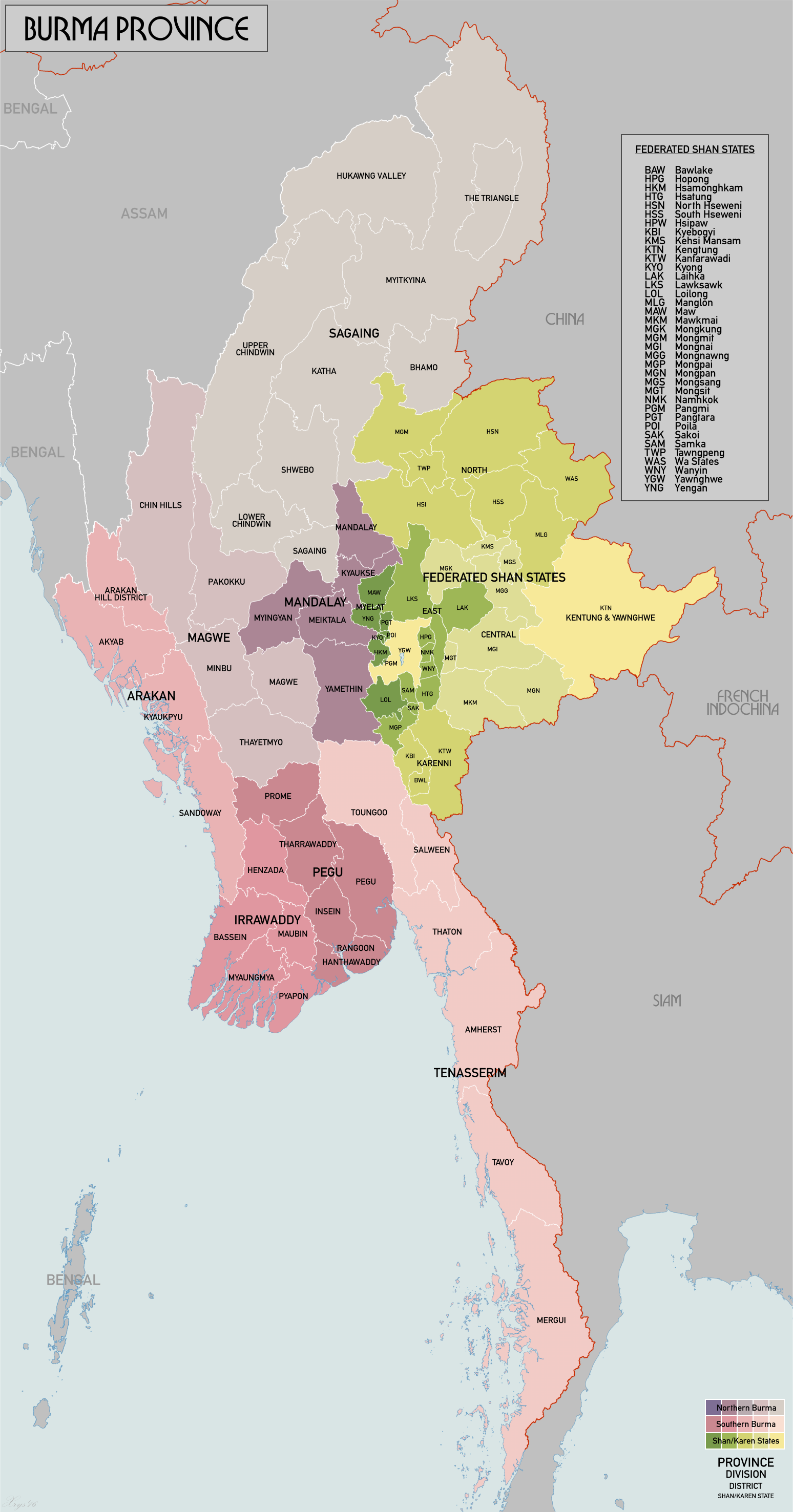
Administrative map of the Burma Province, 1931

The province of Burma after 1885 was administered as follows:

1. Ministerial Burma (Burma proper)
2. Tenasserim Division (Toungoo, Thaton, Amherst, Salween, Tavoy, and Mergui Districts)
3. Arakan Division (Akyab, Arakan Hill, Kyaukpyu and Sandoway Districts)
4. Pegu Division (Insein, Hanthawaddy, Pegu, Tharrawaddy and Prome Districts)
5. Irrawaddy Division (Bassein, Henzada, Thayetmyo, Maubin, Myaungmya and Pyapon Districts)
6. Scheduled Areas (Frontier Areas)
7. Shan States
8. Chin tracts
9. Kachin tracts

The "Frontier Areas", also known as the "Excluded Areas" or the "Scheduled Areas", compose the majority of states within Burma today. They were administered separately by the British with a Burma Frontier Service and later united with Burma proper to form Myanmar's geographic composition today. The Frontier Areas were inhabited by ethnic minorities such as the Chin, the Shan, the Kachin and the Karenni.

By 1931, Burma had 8 divisions, split into a number of districts.

1. Arakan Division (Akyab, Arakan Hill, Kyaukpyu and Sandoway Districts)
2. Magwe Division (Chin Hill, Magway, Minbu, Pakokku and Thayetmyo Districts)
3. Mandalay Division (Kyaukse, Mandalay, Meiktila and Myingyan Districts)
4. Tenasserim Division (Toungoo, Thaton, Amherst, Salween, Tavoy, and Mergui Districts)
5. Pegu Division (Insein, Hanthawaddy, Pegu, Tharrawaddy and Prome Districts)
6. Irrawaddy Division (Bassein, Henzada, Maubin, Myaungmya and Pyapon Districts)
7. Sagaing Division (Bhamo, Lower Chindwin, Upper Chindwin, Katha, Myitkyina, Sagaing Districts, the Hukawng Valley and The Triangle Native areas)
8. Federated Shan States

=== Economy ===
The traditional Burmese economy was one of redistribution with the prices of the most important commodities set by the state. For the majority of the population, trade was not as important as self-sufficient agriculture, but the country's position on major trade routes from India to China meant that it did gain a significant amount of money from facilitating foreign trade. With the arrival of the British, the Burmese economy became tied to global market forces and was forced to become a part of the colonial export economy.

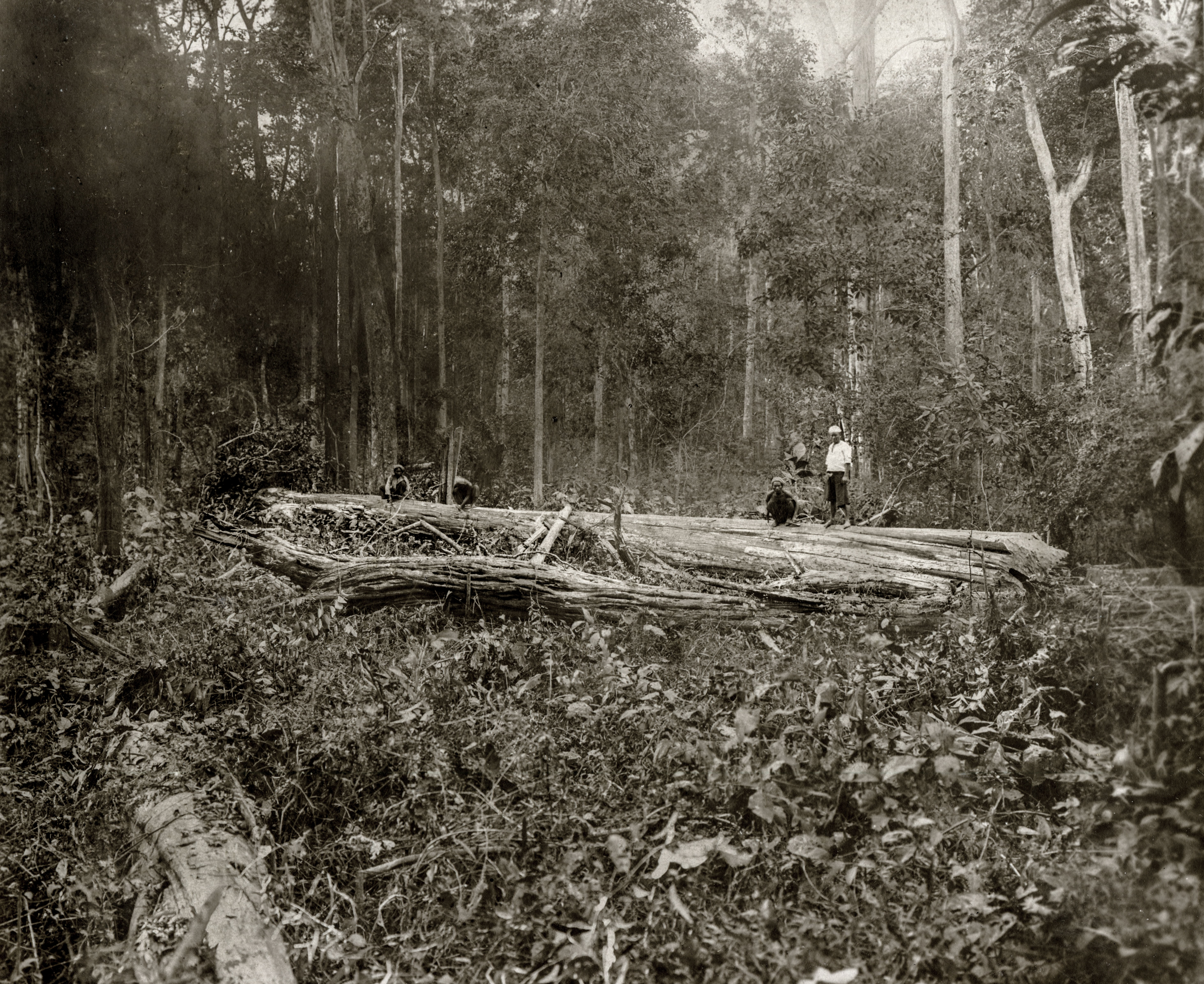
An image of deforestation in Burma taken by a Bombay Burmah Trading Corporation official.

Burma's annexation ushered in a new period of economic growth. The economic nature of society also changed dramatically. The British began exploiting the rich soil of the land around the Irrawaddy delta and cleared away the dense mangrove forests. Rice, which was in high demand in Europe, especially after the building of the Suez Canal in 1869, was the main export. To increase the production of rice, many Burmese migrated from the northern heartland to the delta, shifting the population concentration and changing the basis of wealth and power.

To prepare the new land for cultivation, farmers borrowed money from Indian Tamil moneylenders called Chettiars at high interest rates, as British banks would not grant mortgages. The Indian moneylenders offered mortgage loans but foreclosed on them quickly if the borrowers defaulted.

At the same time, thousands of Indian labourers migrated to Burma (Burmese Indians) and, because of their willingness to work for less money, quickly displaced Burmese farmers. As the Encyclopædia Britannica states: "Burmese villagers, unemployed and lost in a disintegrating society, sometimes took to petty theft and robbery and were soon characterized by the British as lazy and undisciplined. The level of dysfunction in Burmese society was revealed by the dramatic rise in homicides."

With this quickly growing economy came industrialisation to a certain degree, with a railway being built throughout the valley of the Irrawaddy, and hundreds of steamboats travelled along the river. All of these modes of transportation were owned by the British. Thus, although the balance of trade was in favour of British Burma, the society was changed so fundamentally that many people did not gain from the rapidly growing economy.

The civil service was largely staffed by Anglo-Burmese and Indians, and the ethnic Burmese were excluded almost entirely from military service, which was staffed primarily with Indians, Anglo-Burmese, Karens and other Burmese minority groups. A British General Hospital Burmah was set up in Rangoon in 1887. Though the country prospered, the Burmese people largely failed to reap the rewards. (See George Orwell's novel Burmese Days for a fictional account of the British in Burma.) An account by a British official describing the conditions of the Burmese people's livelihoods in 1941 describes the Burmese hardships:

“Foreign landlordism and the operations of foreign moneylenders had led to increasing exportation of a considerable proportion of the country’s resources and to the progressive impoverishment of the agriculturist and of the country as a whole…. The peasant had grown factually poorer and unemployment had increased….The collapse of the Burmese social system led to a decay of the social conscience which, in the circumstances of poverty and unemployment caused a great increase in crime.”

== Burmese nationalism ==
=== Early days ===
By early twentieth century, a nationalist movement began to take shape in the form of the Young Men's Buddhist Association (YMBA), formed in 1906, modelled after the YMCA, as religious associations were allowed by the colonial authorities. They began to establish a number of schools through private donations and government grants. The YMBA was later superseded by the General Council of Burmese Associations (GCBA) which was linked with Wunthanu athin or National Associations that sprang up in villages throughout Burma. Between 1900 and 1911 the "Irish Buddhist" U Dhammaloka publicly challenged Christianity and imperial power, leading to two trials for sedition.

A new generation of Burmese leaders arose in the early twentieth century from amongst the educated classes, some of whom were permitted to go to London to study law. They returned with the belief that the Burmese situation could be improved through reform. Progressive constitutional reform in the early 1920s led to a legislature with limited powers, a university and more autonomy for Burma within the administration of India. Efforts were undertaken to increase the representation of Burmese in the civil service. Some people began to feel that the rate of change was not fast enough and the reforms not extensive enough.

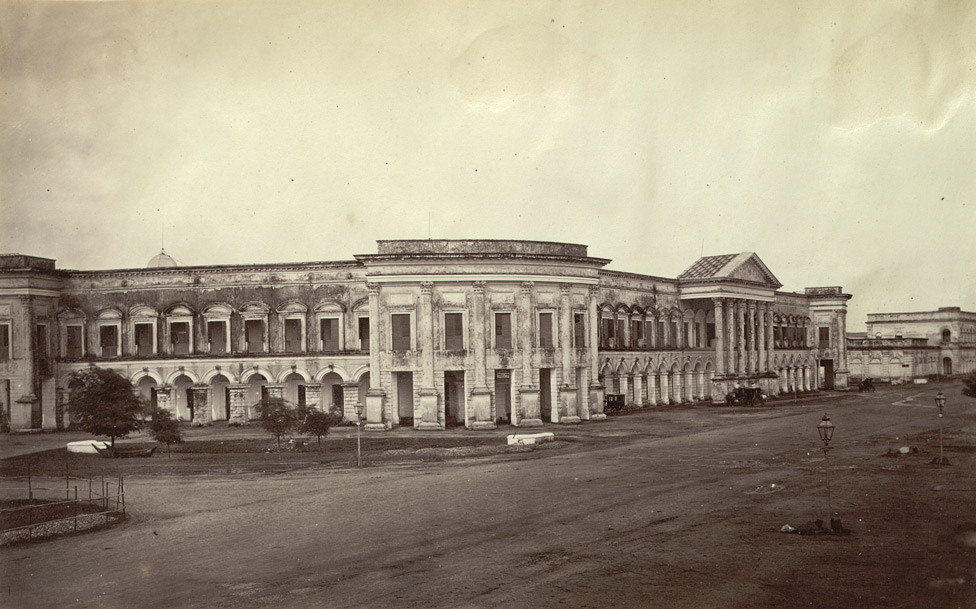
District Courts and Public Offices, Strand Road, Rangoon in 1868

Social discontent was also on the rise in the 1920s mainly against being disadvantaged in relation to the Indian and Chinese migrants who were financially better. Local population felt strongly against being economically exploited though the communities lived relatively at peace with each other. In 1909, minor changes were made to the Burmese constitution vis-a-vis major reforms to the Indian constitution. Further changes in 1920 aimed to ignore reforms in Burma which led to nationwide protests spearheaded by the barristers.

In 1920, a student strike broke out in protest against the new University Act which the students believed would only benefit the elite and perpetuate colonial rule. 'National Schools' sprang up across the country in protest against the colonial education system, and the strike came to be commemorated as 'National Day'. There were further strikes and anti-tax protests in the later 1920s led by the Wunthanu athins. Prominent among the political activists were Buddhist monks (hpongyi), such as U Ottama and U Seinda in the Arakan who subsequently led an armed rebellion against the British and later the nationalist government after independence, and U Wisara, the first martyr of the movement to die after a protracted hunger strike in prison.

=== The rise ===
In December 1930, a local tax protest by Saya San in Tharrawaddy quickly grew into first a regional and then a national insurrection against the government. Lasting for two years, the Galon Rebellion, named after the mythical bird Garuda – enemy of the Nagas, i.e. the British – emblazoned on the pennants the rebels carried, required thousands of British troops to suppress along with promises of further political reform. The eventual trial of Saya San, who was executed, allowed several future national leaders, including Dr Ba Maw and U Saw, who participated in his defence, to rise to prominence.

During the 1930 Rangoon riot, the Dobama Asiayone (We Burmans Association) was founded, whose members called themselves thakin (an ironic name as thakin means "master" in the Burmese language – rather like the Indian 'sahib' – proclaiming that they were the true masters of the country entitled to the term usurped by the colonial masters). The second university student strike in 1936 was triggered by the expulsion of Aung San and Thakin Nu, leaders of the Rangoon University Students Union, for refusing to reveal the name of the author who had written an article in their university magazine, making a scathing attack on one of the senior university officials. It spread to Mandalay leading to the formation of the All Burma Students Union. Aung San and Nu subsequently joined the Thakin movement progressing from student to national politics.

== Separation from India ==
The British separated Burma Province from British India on 1 April 1937 and granted the colony a new constitution calling for a fully elected assembly, with many powers given to the Burmese. Archibald Cochrane was appointed as its first governor, while Ba Maw served as the first prime minister of Burma; he was then forced out by U Saw in 1939, who served as prime minister from 1940 until he was arrested on 19 January 1942 by the British for communicating with the Japanese. While the reforms were celebrated across the nation initially, they soon proved more divisive than anticipated, as some Burmese felt that they were a ploy to exclude Burma from any further reforms to British India.

In 1938, a wave of strikes and protests began in the oilfields of central Burma, after the British-owned Burmah Oil Company (BOC) fired staff without reason and otherwise mistreated workers, becoming a general strike with far-reaching consequences, known as the 1300 Revolution (Htaung thoun ya byei ayeidawbon in Burmese). In Mandalay, the police shot into a crowd of protesters led by Buddhist monks, killing 17 people. In Rangoon, student protesters picketing the Secretariat (the seat of the colonial government) were charged by the British mounted police, leading to the death of Bo Aung Kyaw, a Rangoon University student and the first student to be killed fighting the British. To this day, 20 December is known as Bo Aung Kyaw Day among students in Myanmar, commemorating their first martyr.

== World War II ==
The Empire of Japan invaded Burma in December 1941 and by the end of 1942 controlled much of the colony. In 1943, the State of Burma was proclaimed in Rangoon, with the government run as a puppet state under Japanese control, led by head of state Ba Maw who escaped from prison in April 1942. Japan never succeeded in fully conquering all of the colony, however, and insurgent activity was pervasive, though not as much of an issue as it was in other former colonies. By 1945, British-led troops, mainly from the British Indian Army, had regained control over most of the colony with Rangoon being recaptured in May 1945.

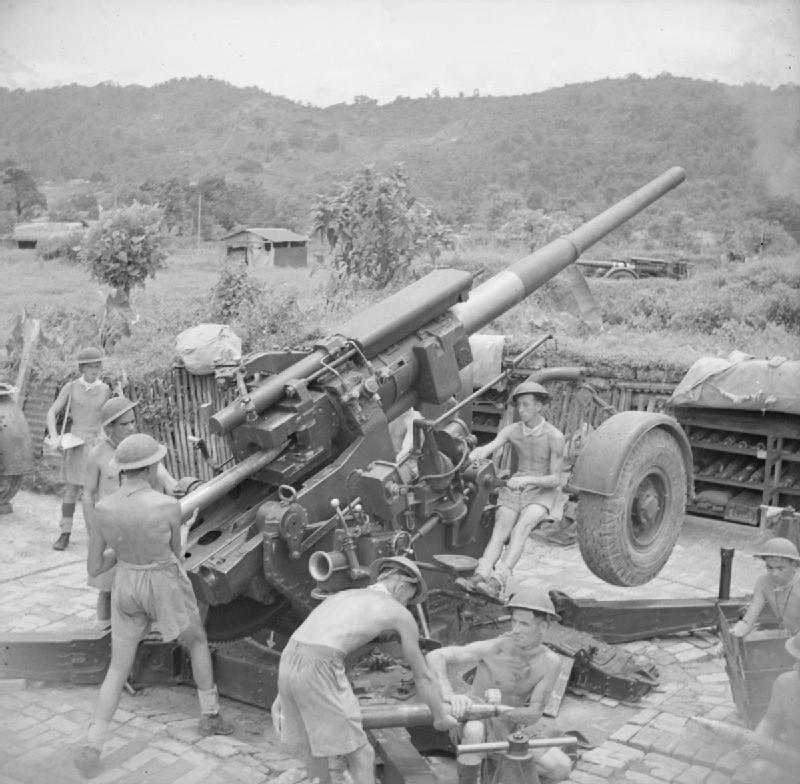
The British Army in Burma 1944

== After Japanese surrender ==
The surrender of the Japanese brought a military administration to Burma. The British administration sought to try Aung San and other members of the British Indian Army for treason and collaboration with the Japanese. Lord Mountbatten knew that a trial was an impossibility considering Aung San's popular appeal. After the war ended, the British governor, Colonel Sir Reginald Dorman-Smith, returned. The restored government established a political programme that focused on the physical reconstruction of the country and delayed discussion of independence. The Anti-Fascist People's Freedom League (AFPFL) opposed the government leading to political instability in the country. A rift had also developed in the AFPFL between the communists and Aung San together with the socialists over strategy, which led to Than Tun being forced to resign as general secretary in July 1946 and the expulsion of the CPB from the AFPFL the following October.

Dorman-Smith was replaced by Major-General Sir Hubert Rance as the new governor, and the Rangoon police went on strike. The strike, starting in September 1946, then spread from the police to government employees and came close to becoming a general strike. Rance calmed the situation by meeting with Aung San and convincing him to join the governor's Executive Council along with other members of the AFPFL. The new executive council, which now had increased credibility in the country, began negotiations for Burmese independence, which were concluded successfully in London as the Aung San-Attlee Agreement on 27 January 1947.

The agreement left parts of the communist and conservative branches of the AFPFL dissatisfied, sending the Red Flag Communists led by Thakin Soe underground and the conservatives into opposition. Aung San also succeeded in concluding an agreement with ethnic minorities for a unified Burma at the Panglong Conference on 12 February, celebrated since as 'Union Day'. Shortly after, rebellion broke out in the Arakan led by the veteran monk U Seinda, and it began to spread to other districts. The popularity of the AFPFL, dominated by Aung San and the socialists, was eventually confirmed when it won an overwhelming victory in the April 1947 constituent assembly elections.

== Aung San's assassination ==
On 19 July 1947, U Saw, a conservative pre-war prime minister of Burma, engineered the assassination of Aung San and several members of his cabinet including his eldest brother Ba Win, the father of today's National League for Democracy exile-government leader Dr Sein Win, while meeting in the Secretariat. Since then, 19 July has been commemorated as Martyrs' Day in Burma. Thakin Nu, the Socialist leader, was now asked to form a new cabinet, and he presided over Burmese independence instituted under the Burma Independence Act 1947 on 4 January 1948. Burma chose to become a fully independent republic, and not a British Dominion upon independence. This was in contrast to the independence of India and Pakistan which both resulted in the attainment of dominion status. This may have been on account of anti-British popular sentiment being strong in Burma at the time.

== Colonial independence ==
Burma became an independent republic on 4 January 1948, with Thakin Nu assuming office as prime minister. Civil war broke out just three months after independence. This conflict has continued under various guises to the present day.

== See also ==
- History of Myanmar
- List of colonial heads of Burma
