= Mongolia–Myanmar relations =

- Mongolia: Myanmar

Mongolia–Myanmar relations refer to the bilateral relations between the Republic of the Union of Myanmar and Mongolia. Myanmar and Mongolia established diplomatic relations in 1962. Myanmar has a non resident ambassador in Beijing. Mongolia has a non resident ambassador in Bangkok. Both countries are members of the Non-Aligned Movement and Group of 77.

== Background and historical context ==
Both countries are predominantly Buddhist. The earliest significant interaction between the regions now known as Myanmar and Mongolia dates back to the 13th century during the Mongol Empire's expansion. The Mongol invasions of the Pagan Kingdom (modern-day Myanmar) occurred between 1277 and 1287. The Mongols, under Kublai Khan, sought to extend their influence into Southeast Asia, leading to military campaigns against the Pagan Kingdom. The invasions led to the decline of Pagan's centralized power, though the Mongols did not establish lasting control over the region. After the Mongol Empire's withdrawal, direct interactions between the two regions were minimal for centuries due to geographical separation.

== Relations and trade ==
Since both of the country's independence, Myanmar and Mongolia have engaged in various diplomatic exchanges aimed at strengthening bilateral relations.

In November 2013, Mongolian President Tsakhiagiin Elbegdorj visited Myanmar, marking the first visit by a Mongolian head of state to the country since diplomatic relations were established in 1956. During the visit, both leaders discussed opportunities to enhance cooperation in areas such as trade, culture, and regional matters. Later that same year, Myanmar President Thein Sein traveled to Mongolia, becoming the first Myanmar president to visit since the establishment of diplomatic relations in 1956.

In 2013, Mongolia and Myanmar signed an Agreement on Air Communication. In 2015, the two nations signed a Memorandum of Understanding on Cooperation in Tourism which aims to promote cultural exchange through tourism initiatives.

Trade between Myanmar and Mongolia has been modest. In 2020, Myanmar exported approximately $161,000 worth of goods to Mongolia, primarily consisting of knitwear and textiles. Conversely, Mongolia's exports to Myanmar were valued at around $19,800, including tugboats and textiles.

Cultural and educational exchanges have been integral to both country's relations. In 2016, Myanmar exported textiles worth $370,000 to Mongolia.

Both Myanmar and Mongolia are active participants in regional organizations, including the Asia-Europe Meeting (ASEM). In 2017, Mongolia signed an air communication agreement with Myanmar and Cambodia during the 4th ASEM Transport Minister's Meeting in Indonesia, aiming to enhance regional connectivity.

== See also ==
- Foreign relations of Myanmar
- Foreign relations of Mongolia
