= Myanmar–Taiwan relations =

- Taiwan: Myanmar

Diplomatic mission
- Taipei Economic and Cultural Office in Myanmar: Myanmar Trade Office, the Republic of the Union of Myanmar

Myanmar–Taiwan relations refers to the international relations between Myanmar and the Republic of China. There are no official relations between the two countries, as Myanmar only recognizes the People's Republic of China (PRC) and considers Taiwan to be an integral part of the PRC.

== History ==
In 1949, following the end of the Chinese Civil War, some Kuomintang soldiers fled and took a stronghold in Northern Thailand and Myanmar with support from the US. With support from the PRC, Myanmar accused the Republic of China of "invading" Myanmar, and issued an appeal to the United Nations. After many negotiations, all Kuomintang soldiers in Myanmar were sent to Northern Thailand. Kuomintang soldiers helped Thailand fight communist rebels, and prevented a left revolution in Thailand, which led to the King of Thailand, Bhumibol Adulyadej, giving Kuomintang soldiers special amnesty for entitlement in Thailand, whilst some left for Taiwan.

Historically, the Republic of China has claimed parts of Myanmar's Kachin State as its own territory.

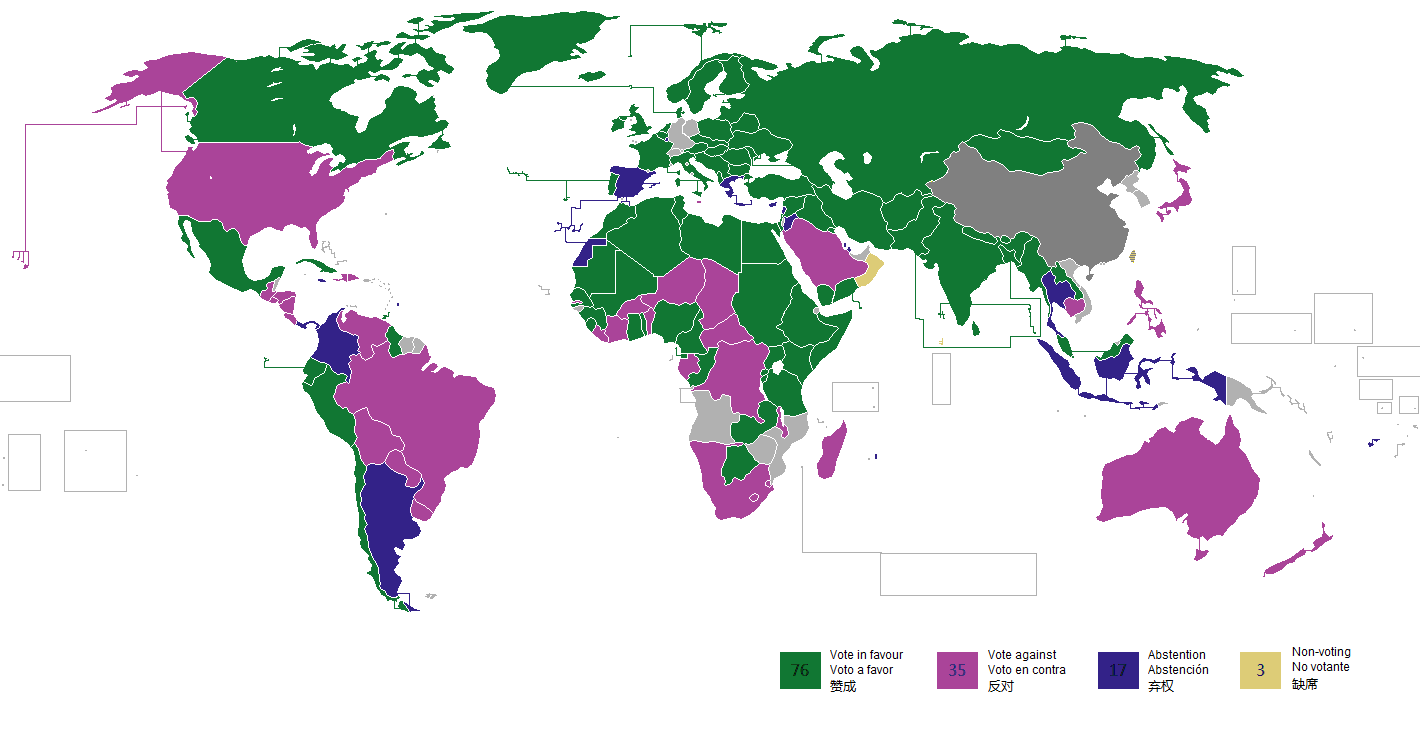
On 8 June 1950, Myanmar recognized the People's Republic of China as the legitimate China.

== Diplomatic representation ==
In the absence of formal diplomatic relations, Myanmar has a mission in Taipei known as the Myanmar Trade Office, the Republic of the Union of Myanmar. Operated by the country's Ministry of Commerce, this was established in June 2015. Taiwan currently has a mission in Yangon, with Myanmar affairs being handled by the Taipei Economic and Cultural Office in Yangon, Myanmar. Additionally, the Taiwan External Trade Development Council established a trade center in Yangon in November 2013.

== Economic ==
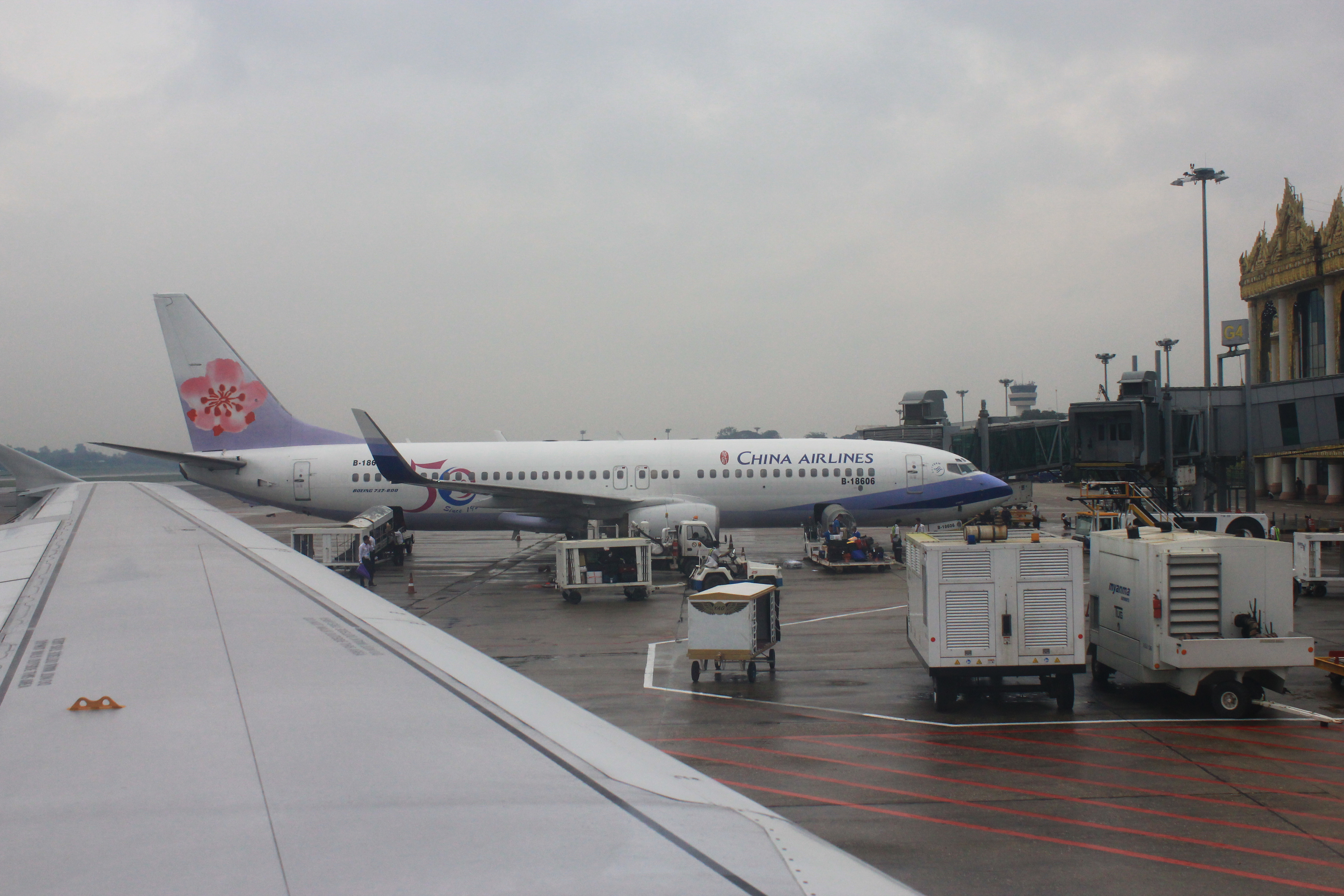
China Airlines's Boeing 737-800 aircraft in Yangon International Airport

=== Agriculture ===
Taiwan-based Known-You Seed Corporation established in 1968, moved into the Myanmar market in 1994. In 1996, it began to cooperate with the Ministry of Agriculture & Irrigation of Myanmar, which founded an agricultural school in Irrawaddy. The most frequently imported product is watermelon.

=== Transportation ===
China Airlines offers flights from Taiwan Taoyuan International Airport to Yangon International Airport.
