= Myanmar–Saudi Arabia relations =

Myanmar–Saudi Arabia relations العلاقات البورمية السعوديةဆော်ဒီအာရေးဘီးယား-မြန်မာ ဆက်ဆံရေး
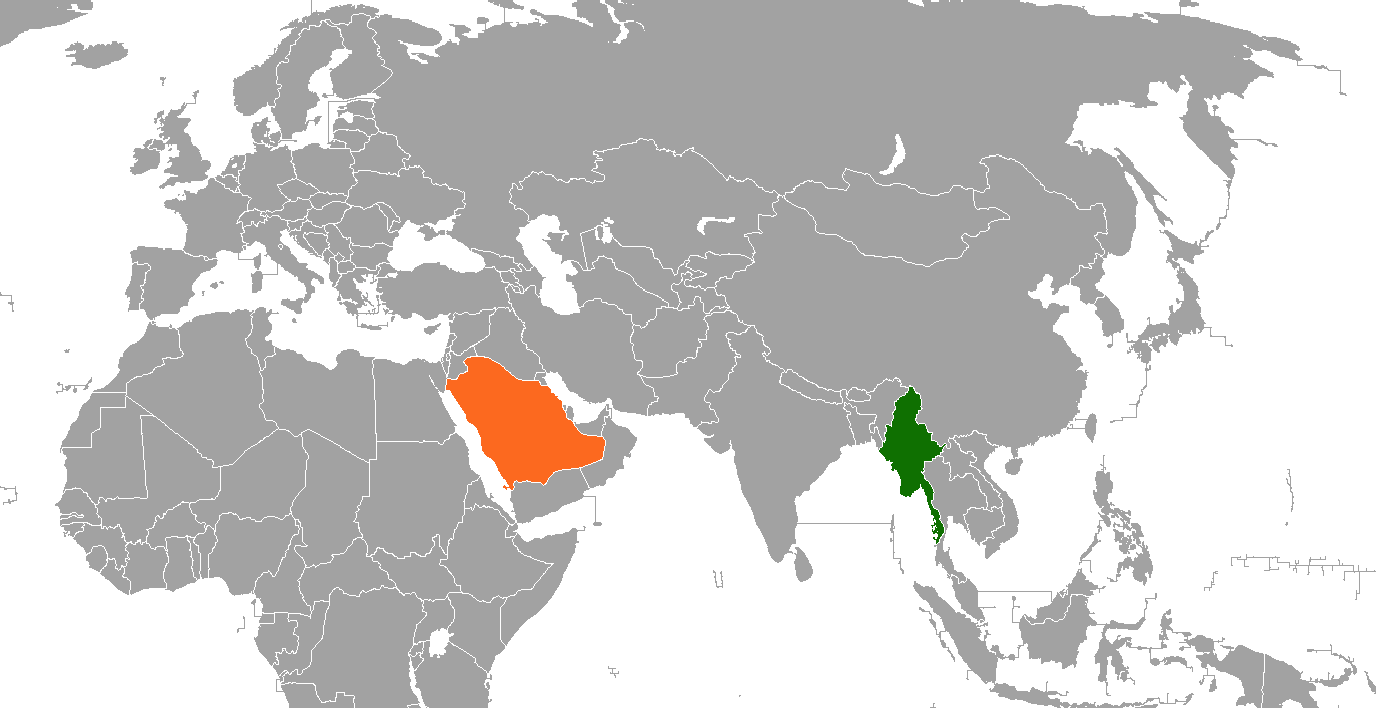
- Myanmar: Saudi Arabia

Diplomatic mission
- Yangon, Myanmar: Riyadh, Saudi Arabia

Envoy
- U Tin Yu: Sahal Moustafa Ahmed Ergesous

The Myanmar–Saudi Arabia relations (Arabic:العلاقات البورمية السعودية; Burmese: ဆော်ဒီအာရေးဘီးယား-မြန်မာ ဆက်ဆံရေး) refers to the diplomatic interactions between the Republic of the Union of Myanmar and the Kingdom of Saudi Arabia. Diplomatic ties between both countries were established in 2004. Myanmar maintains an embassy in Riyadh, while Saudi Arabia has an embassy in Yangon.

== History ==
Saudi Arabia has been involved in the crisis of Myanmar's unrecognized Rohingya population. Relations gained attention after 2012 due to Myanmar’s crackdowns on the Rohingya Muslim population, which drew Saudi Arabia’s interest as a prominent Islamic nation. However, Saudi Arabia’s engagement with Myanmar has primarily focused on trade and diplomacy rather than direct intervention in the Rohingya issue.

Since 2009, Saudi Arabia has agreed to accept 250,000 Rohingyas and other Burmese Muslims. However, the Kingdom's approach has varied over time; while it provided residency relief for 190,000 Burmese Muslims, it also deported another group of Rohingya refugees in 2019.

Since the 2021 Myanmar coup, Saudi Arabia has maintained diplomatic engagement with the junta, unlike many Western nations that imposed sanctions.

In October 2023, Myanmar's Ambassador to Saudi Arabia, U Tin Yu and Abdulrahman Al-Rassi, Saudi Arabia's Deputy Minister for International Multilateral Affairs had meeting to discuss enhancing bilateral relations.

== Trade and relations ==
Trade between Myanmar and Saudi Arabia has seen growth in recent years. In February 2025, Saudi exported SAR 304 million worth of goods to Myanmar and imported SAR 17.9 million from Myanmar, resulting in a trade balance of SAR 286 million. Myanmar's total exports to Saudi Arabia in 2023 recorded a significant increase compared to the previous year.

Both countries have explored the opportunities for export of freshwater fish, including rohu and catla. The Department of Fisheries of Myanmar and the Myanmar Fisheries Federation are working together with Saudi counterparts to facilitate trade through established and legitimate channels.

Both Myanmar and Saudi Arabia have expressed support for peace initiatives in the Middle East. In October 2023, Myanmar acknowledged Saudi Arabia's efforts to reach a roadmap supporting the peace process in Yemen and called on all Yemeni parties to achieve a comprehensive political solution under the auspices of the United Nations.

In 2023, there was a 20% increase in the number of Hajj pilgrims from Myanmar, with 4,500 pilgrims receiving visas from the Saudi embassy in Yangon. his included 280 pilgrims selected by the Myanmar government and 10 chosen as special guests of King Salman bin Abdulaziz Al Saud.

== See also ==
- Foreign relations of Myanmar
- Foreign relations of Saudi Arabia
