= List of diplomatic missions of Myanmar =

This is a list of diplomatic missions of Myanmar. Myanmar (also known as Burma) has a relatively light diplomatic presence in the world, reflecting decades of self-imposed isolation.

The National Unity Government has representative offices in several countries, against embassies which support or tolerate the State Administration Council.

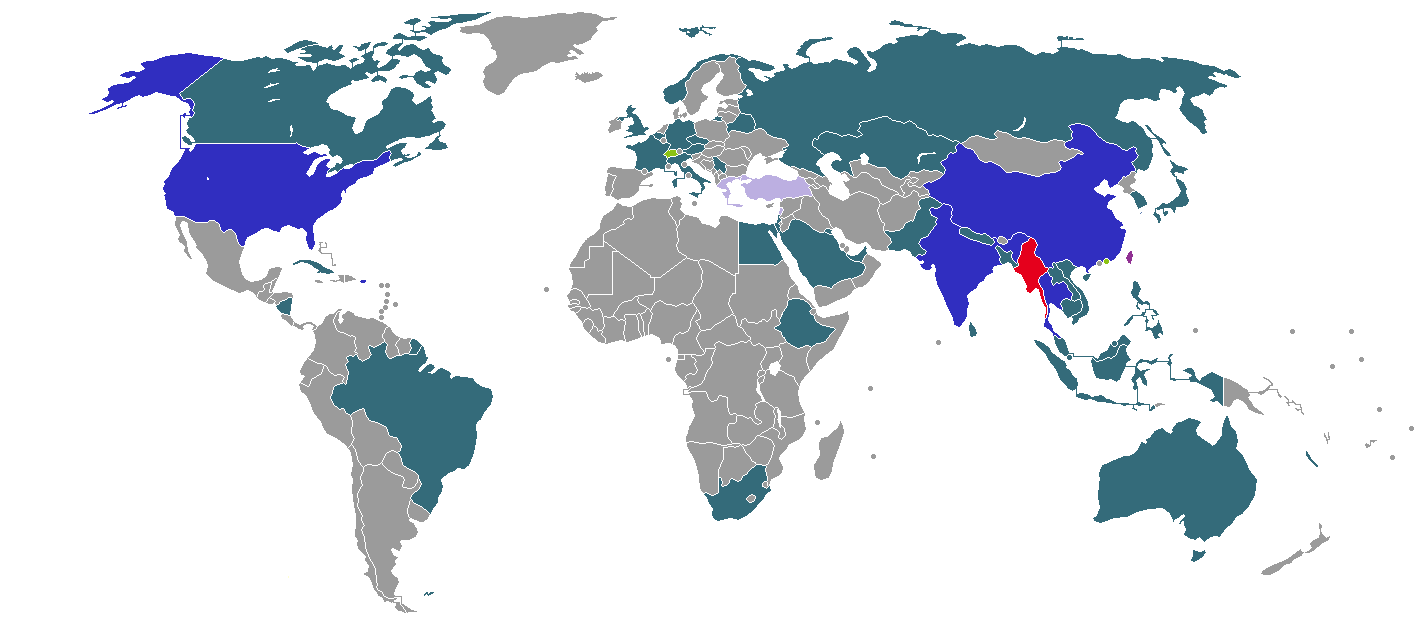
Diplomatic missions of Myanmar Myanmar Embassy and Consulate Embassy Consulate Trade Office

== Diplomatic missions ==
Africa
Host country	Host city	Mission	Head of mission	Concurrent accreditation	References
Egypt	Cairo	Embassy	Kyaw Tin Shein, Ambassador	Countries: Algeria; Iraq; Morocco; Sudan; Turkey	
Ethiopia	Addis Ababa	Embassy	Aung Min Oo, Ambassador	Countries: Somalia	
South Africa	Pretoria	Embassy	Vacant	Countries: Ghana; Kenya; Malawi; Mauritius; Nigeria; Zimbabwe	
Americas
Host country	Host city	Mission	Head of mission	Concurrent accreditation	References
Brazil	Brasília	Embassy	Aung Kyaw Zan, Ambassador	Countries: Argentina; Chile; Peru	
Canada	Ottawa	Embassy	Hau Khan Sum, Ambassador		
Cuba	Havana	Embassy	Zaw Naing Win, Chargé d'affaires		
Nicaragua	Managua	Embassy	Htun Aung Kyaw, Ambassador		
United States	Washington, D.C.	Embassy	Thet Win, Chargé d'affaires		
United States	Los Angeles	Consulate-General	Win Lei Phyu, Consul-General		
Asia
Host country	Host city	Mission	Head of mission	Concurrent accreditation	References
Bangladesh	Dhaka	Embassy	Kyaw Soe Moe, Ambassador		
Brunei	Bandar Seri Begawan	Embassy	Khin Sandar, Chargé d'affaires		
Cambodia	Phnom Penh	Embassy	Kyaw Soe Min, Ambassador		
China	Beijing	Embassy	Tin Maung Swe, Ambassador	Countries: Mongolia; North Korea	
China	Chongqing	Consulate-General	Thwin Htet Lin, Consul-General	Countries: Mongolia; North Korea	
China	Hong Kong	Consulate-General	Han Win Naing, Consul-General	Countries: Mongolia; North Korea	
China	Kunming	Consulate-General		Countries: Mongolia; North Korea	
China	Nanning	Consulate-General		Countries: Mongolia; North Korea	
India	New Delhi	Embassy	Zaw Oo, Ambassador	Countries: Bhutan	
India	Kolkata	Consulate-General	Aung Aung Myo Thein, Consul-General	Countries: Bhutan	
Indonesia	Jakarta	Embassy	Mang Hau Thang, Chargé d'affaires		
Israel	Tel Aviv	Embassy	Maung Maung Lynn, Ambassador	Countries: Cyprus	
Japan	Tokyo	Embassy	Soe Han, Ambassador		
Kuwait	Kuwait City	Embassy	Chan Aye, Ambassador		
Laos	Vientiane	Embassy	Aung Ko, Ambassador		
Malaysia	Kuala Lumpur	Embassy	Aung Soe Win, Ambassador		
Nepal	Kathmandu	Embassy	Myo Myint Maung, Ambassador		
Pakistan	Islamabad	Embassy	Wunna Han, Ambassador		
Philippines	Manila	Embassy	Ei Ei Tin, Chargé d'affaires		
Saudi Arabia	Riyadh	Embassy	Tin Yu, Ambassador	Countries: Bahrain; Oman; Qatar	
Singapore	Singapore	Embassy	Zaw Minn Aung, Chargé d'affaires		
South Korea	Seoul	Embassy	Thant Sin, Ambassador		
Sri Lanka	Colombo	Embassy	Marlar Than Htaik, Ambassador	Countries: Maldives	
Thailand	Bangkok	Embassy	Zaw Zaw Soe, Ambassador		
Thailand	Chiang Mai	Consulate-General	Ming Kyaw Linn, Consul-General		
United Arab Emirates	Abu Dhabi	Embassy	Kyaw Kyaw Min, Ambassador		
United Arab Emirates	Dubai	Consulate-General	Kyaw Thu Nyein, Consul-General		
Vietnam	Hanoi	Embassy	Wai Lin, Ambassador		
Europe
Host country	Host city	Mission	Head of mission	Concurrent accreditation	References
Austria	Vienna	Embassy	Min Thein, Ambassador	Countries: Holy See; Lithuania; International Organizations: United Nations	
Belarus	Minsk	Embassy	Maung Maung Soe, Ambassador		
Belgium	Brussels	Embassy	Soe Lynn Han, Ambassador	Countries: Croatia; Luxembourg; Netherlands; International Organizations: European Union; Organisation for the Prohibition of Chemical Weapons	
Czechia	Prague	Embassy	Htuann Naung, Chargé d'affaires	Countries: Georgia; Hungary	
France	Paris	Embassy	Kyaw Zeya, Ambassador	Countries: Andorra; Spain	
Germany	Berlin	Embassy	Han Thein Kyaw, Chargé d'affaires	Countries: Estonia; Finland; Poland	
Italy	Rome	Embassy	Hmway Hmway Khyne, Ambassador	Countries: Greece; Portugal; Romania; International Organizations: Food and Agriculture Organization; International Fund for Agricultural Development; World Food Programme	
Norway	Oslo	Embassy	Moe Kyaw Aung, Ambassador		
Serbia	Belgrade	Embassy	Than Htwe, Chargé d'affaires	Countries: Bulgaria; Slovakia	
Russia	Moscow	Embassy	Thit Linn Ohn, Ambassador	Countries: Azerbaijan; Kazakhstan; Latvia	
Russia	Novosibirsk	Consulate-General	Pyae Phyo Wai, Consul-General	Countries: Azerbaijan; Kazakhstan; Latvia	
Russia	Saint Petersburg	Consulate-General	Aung Pe Thet, Consul-General	Countries: Azerbaijan; Kazakhstan; Latvia	
United Kingdom	London	Embassy	Win Zeyar Tun, Chargé d'affaires	Countries: Denmark; Ireland; Sweden	
Oceania
Host country	Host city	Mission	Head of mission	Concurrent accreditation	References
Australia	Canberra	Embassy	Myat Thuzar Than, Chargé d'affaires	Countries: New Zealand	
Multilateral organizations
Organization	Host city	Mission	Head of mission	Concurrent accreditation	References
Association of Southeast Asian Nations	Jakarta	Permanent Mission	Aung Myo Myint, Permanent Representative		
United Nations	New York City	Permanent Mission	Hau Do Suan, Permanent Representative		
United Nations	Geneva	Permanent Mission	Myint Thu, Permanent Representative	Countries: Switzerland	

== Representative offices of the National Unity Government ==
Host country	City	Representative
Australia	Canberra	Tun Aung Shwe
Czech Republic	Prague	Linn Thant
France	Paris	Nan Su Mon Aung
Japan	Tokyo	Saw Ba Hla Thein
Norway	Oslo	Maung Maung Myint
South Korea	Seoul	Yan Naing Htun
United Kingdom	London	Maung Maung Aung
United Kingdom	London	Thet Ko Ko

== Gallery ==
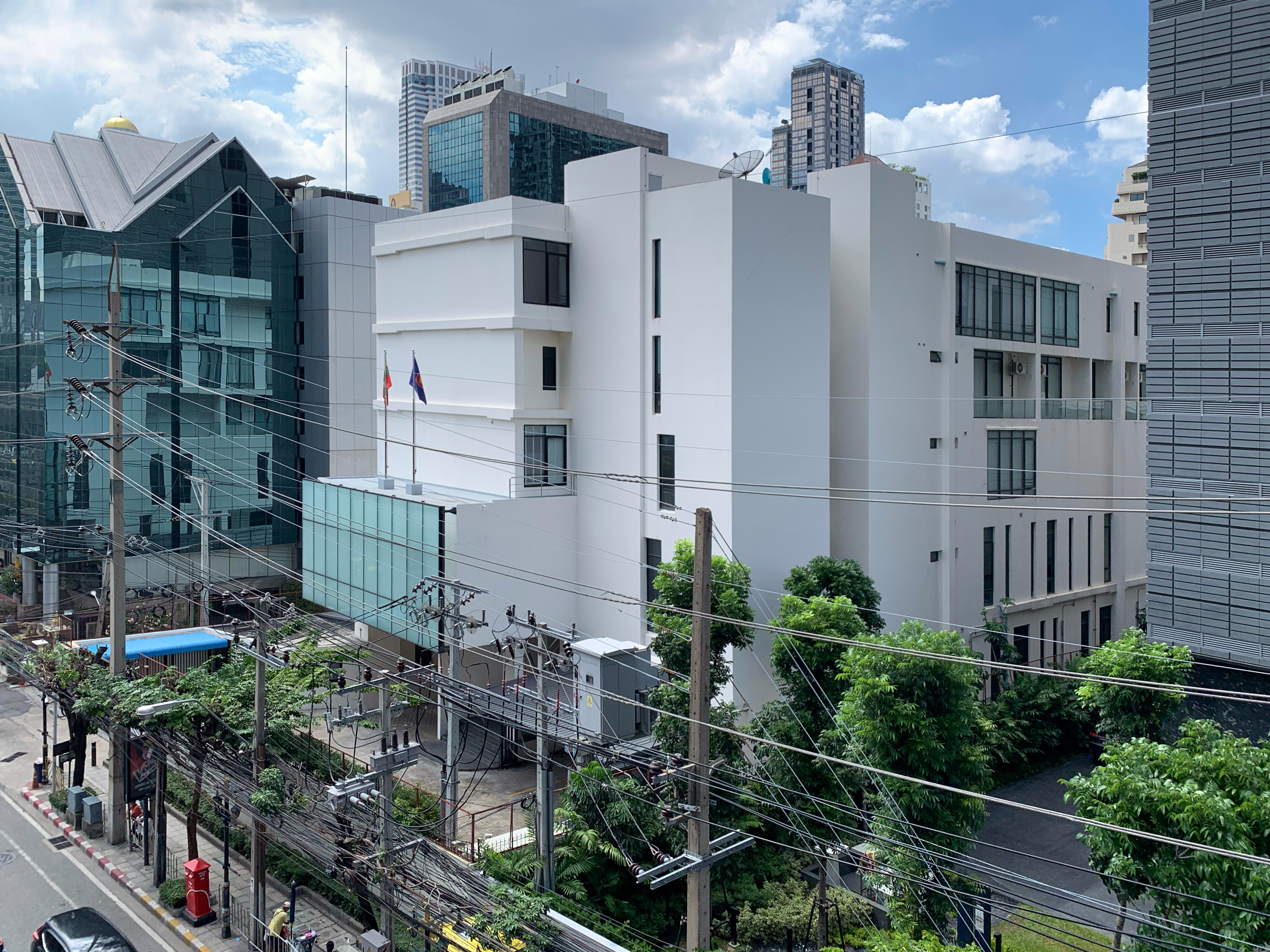
Embassy in Bangkok

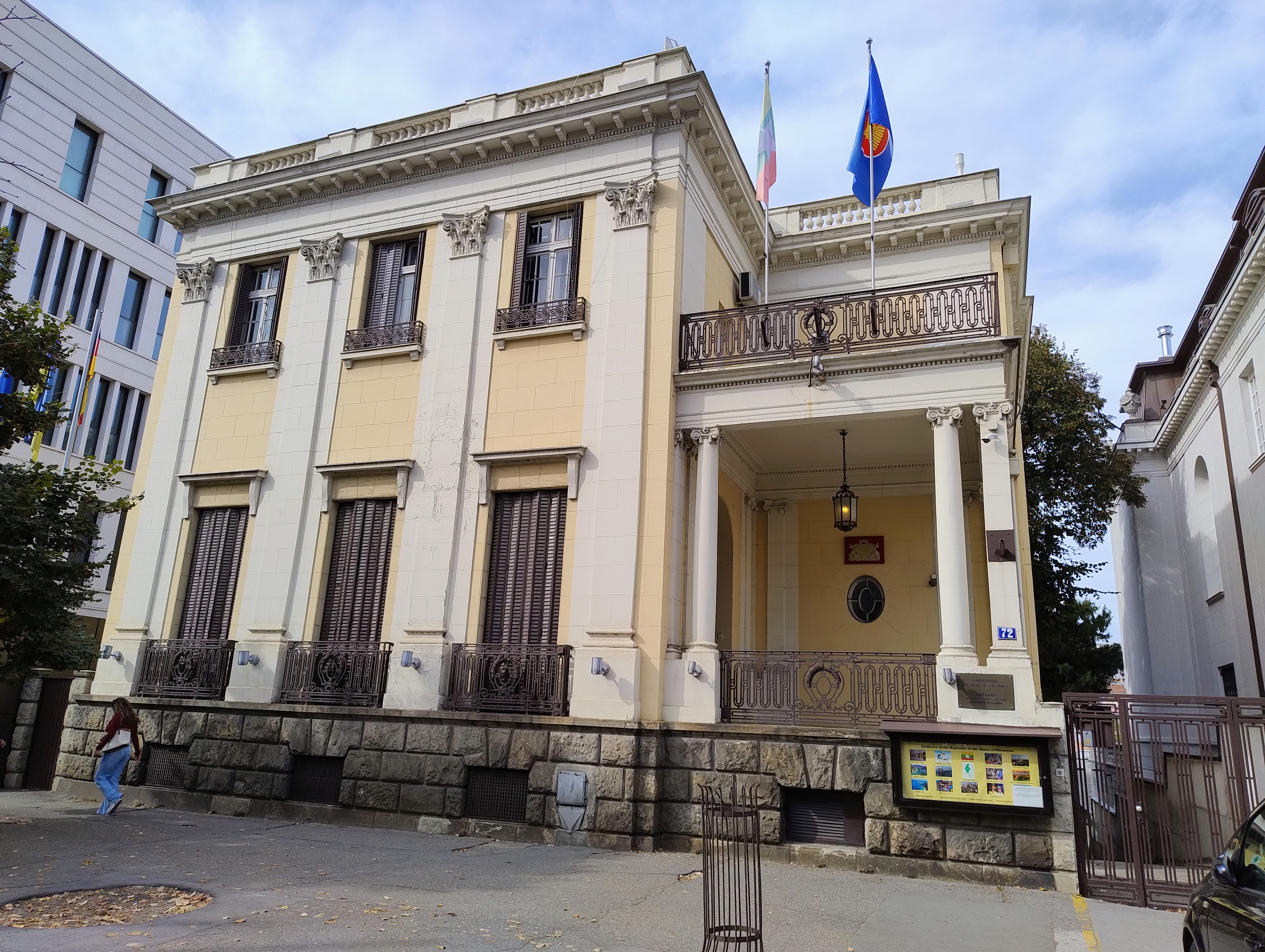
Embassy in Belgrade

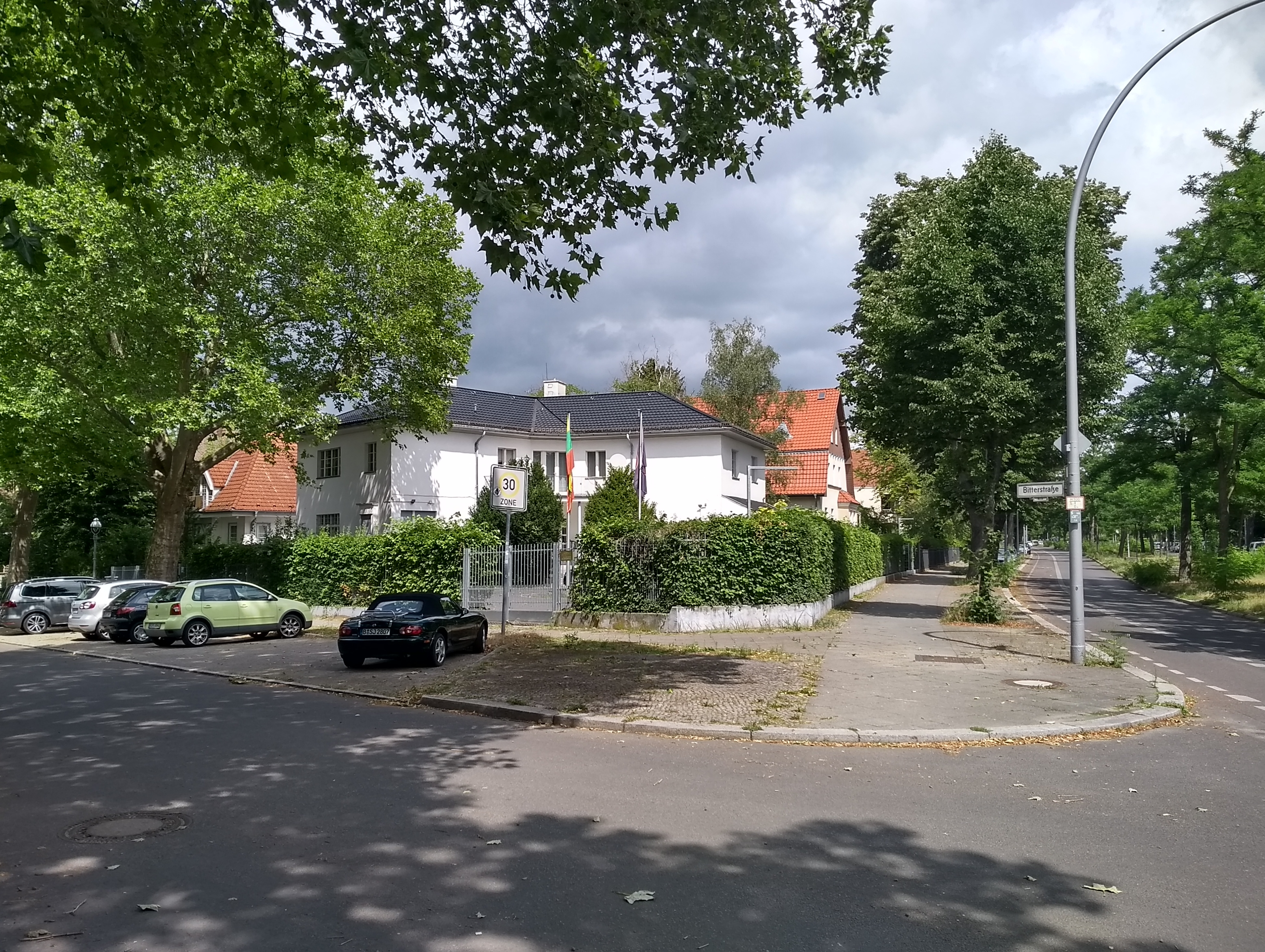
Embassy in Berlin

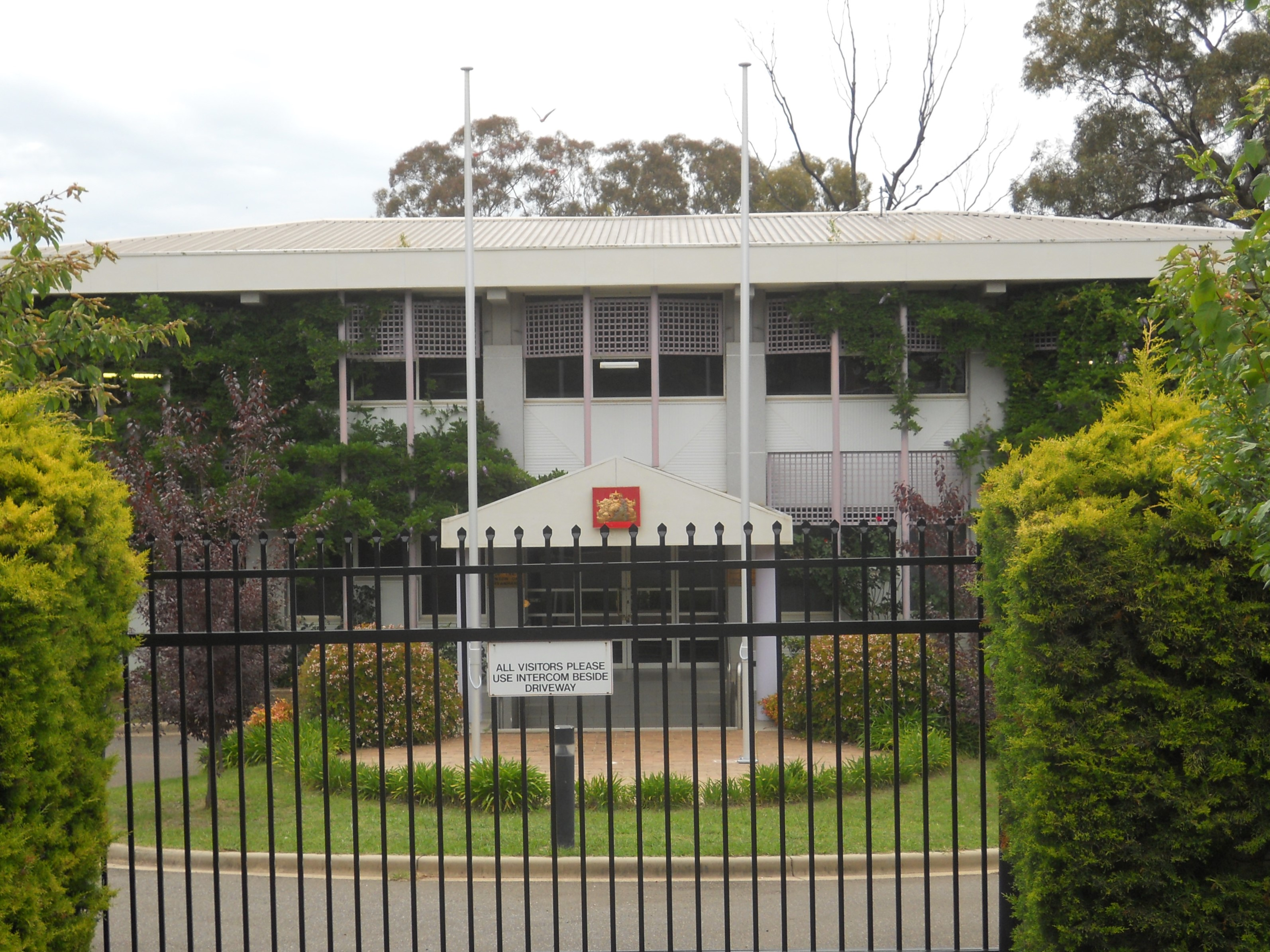
Embassy in Canberra

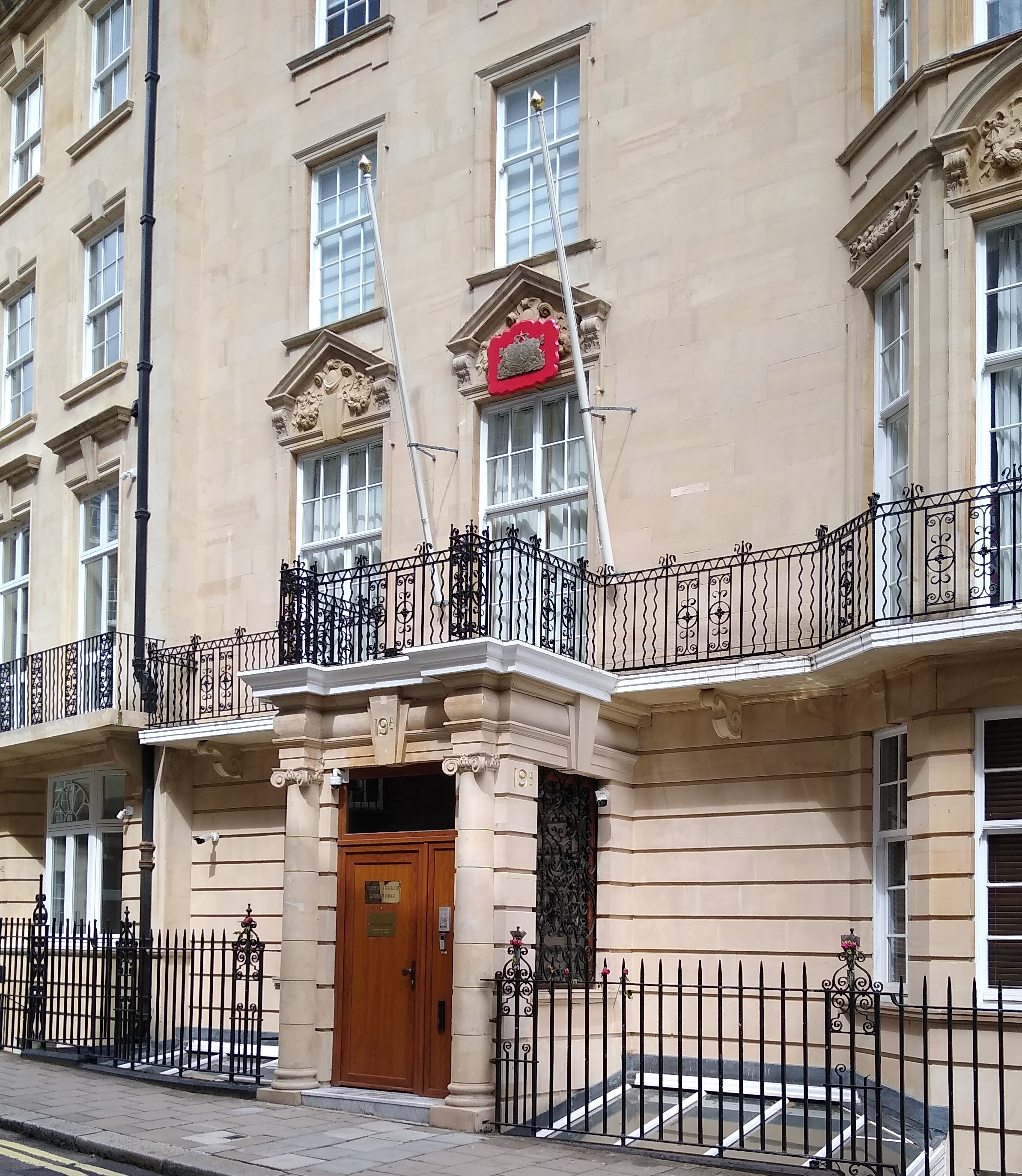
Embassy in London

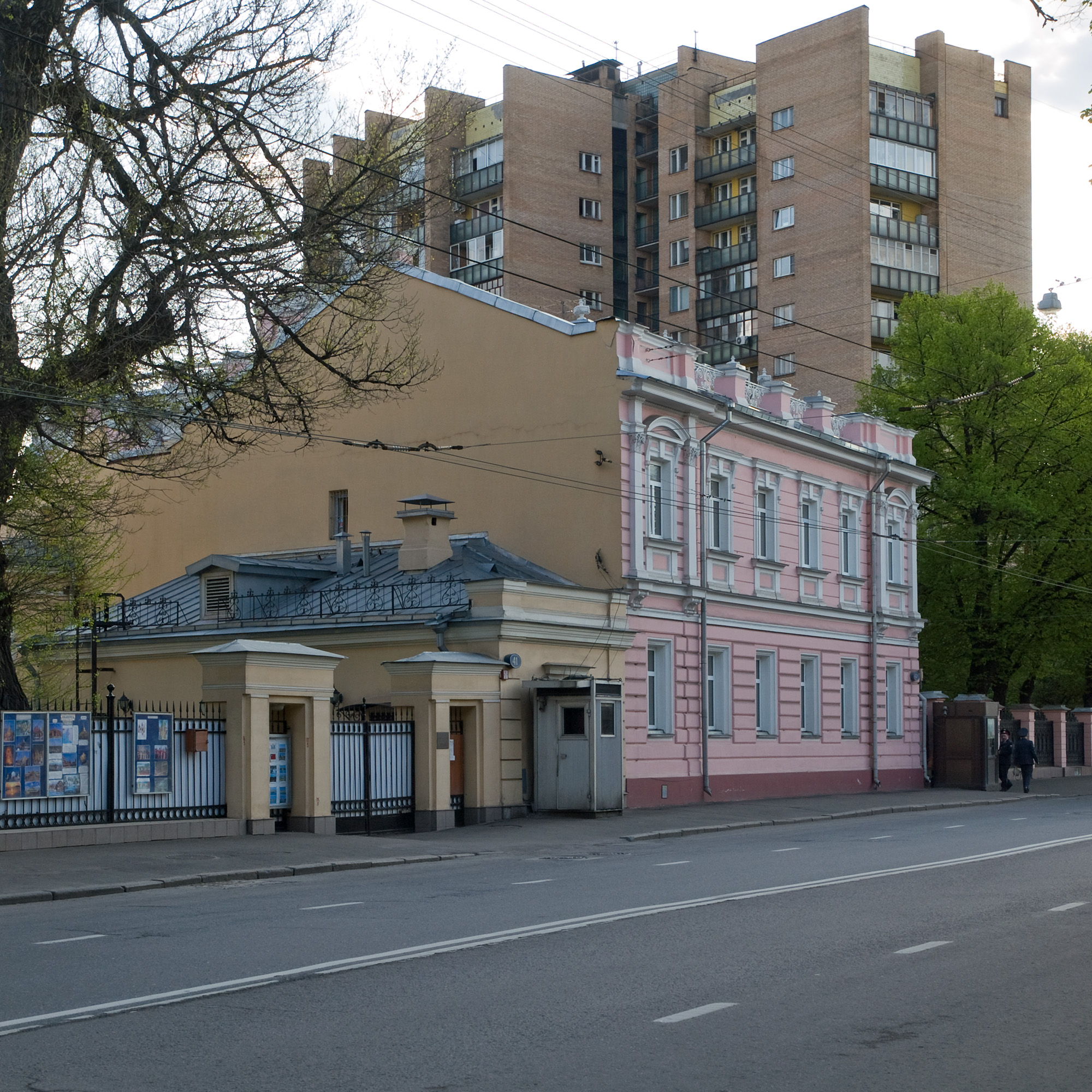
Embassy in Moscow

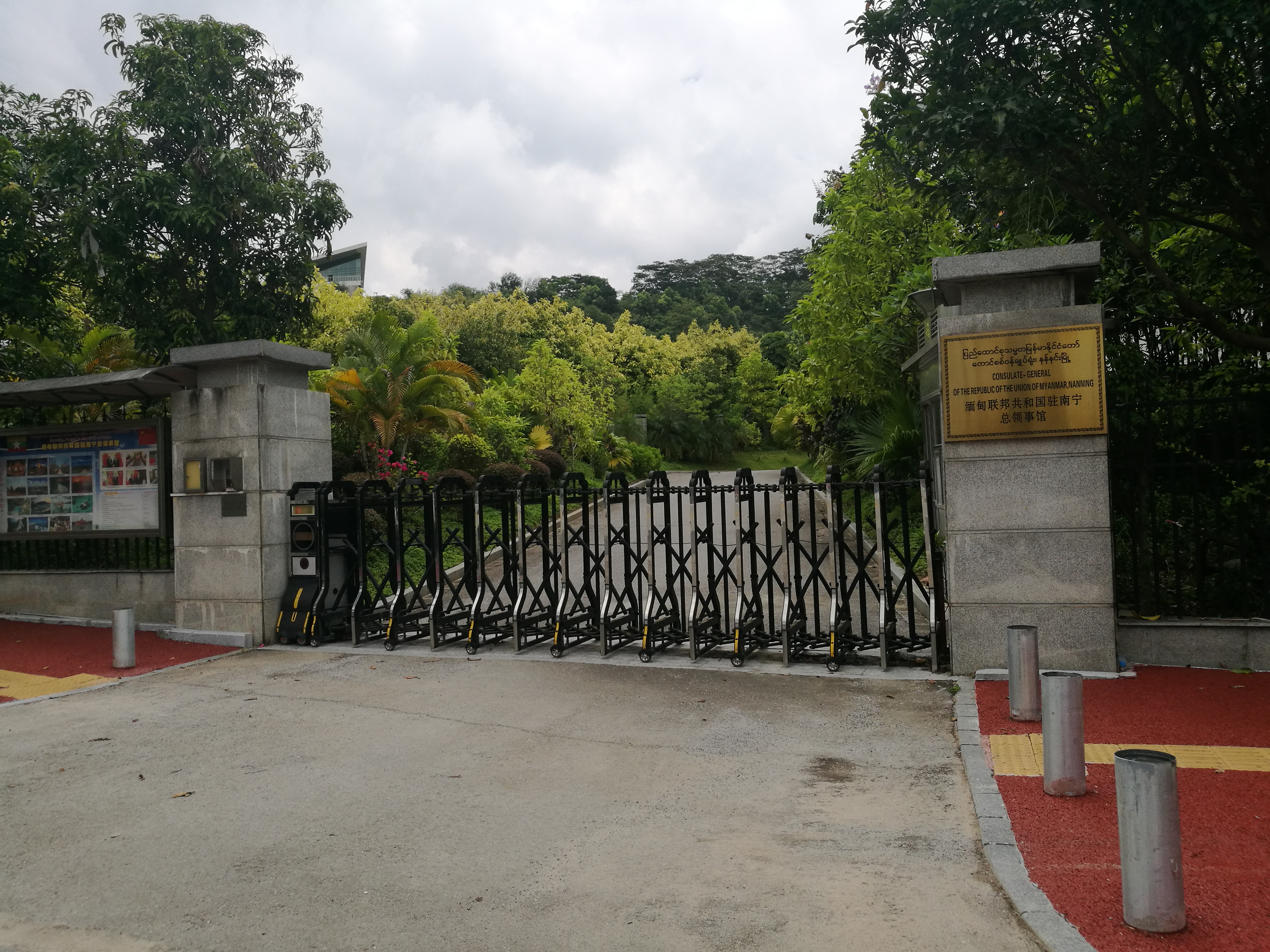
Consulate-General in Nanning

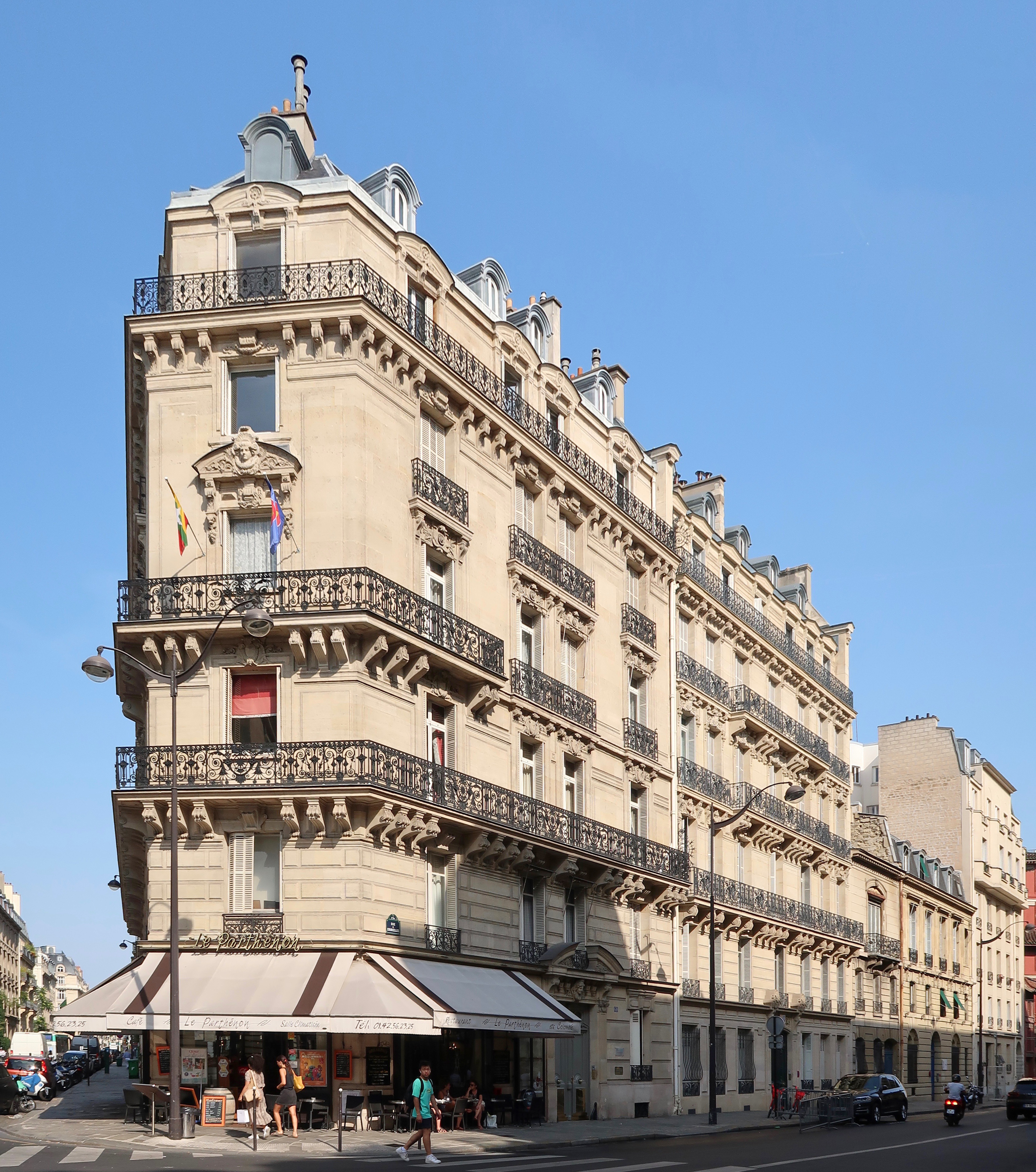
Embassy in Paris

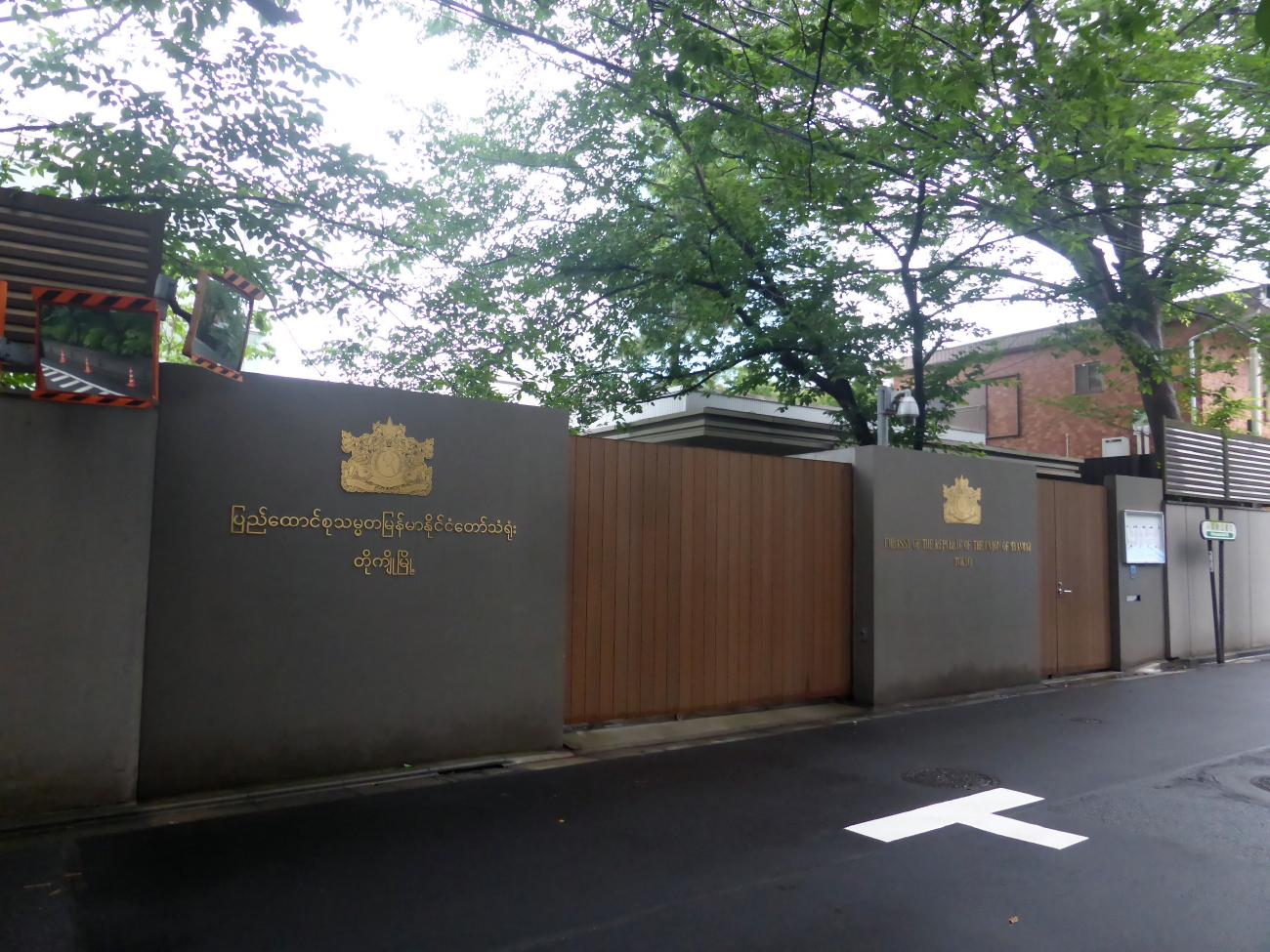
Embassy in Tokyo

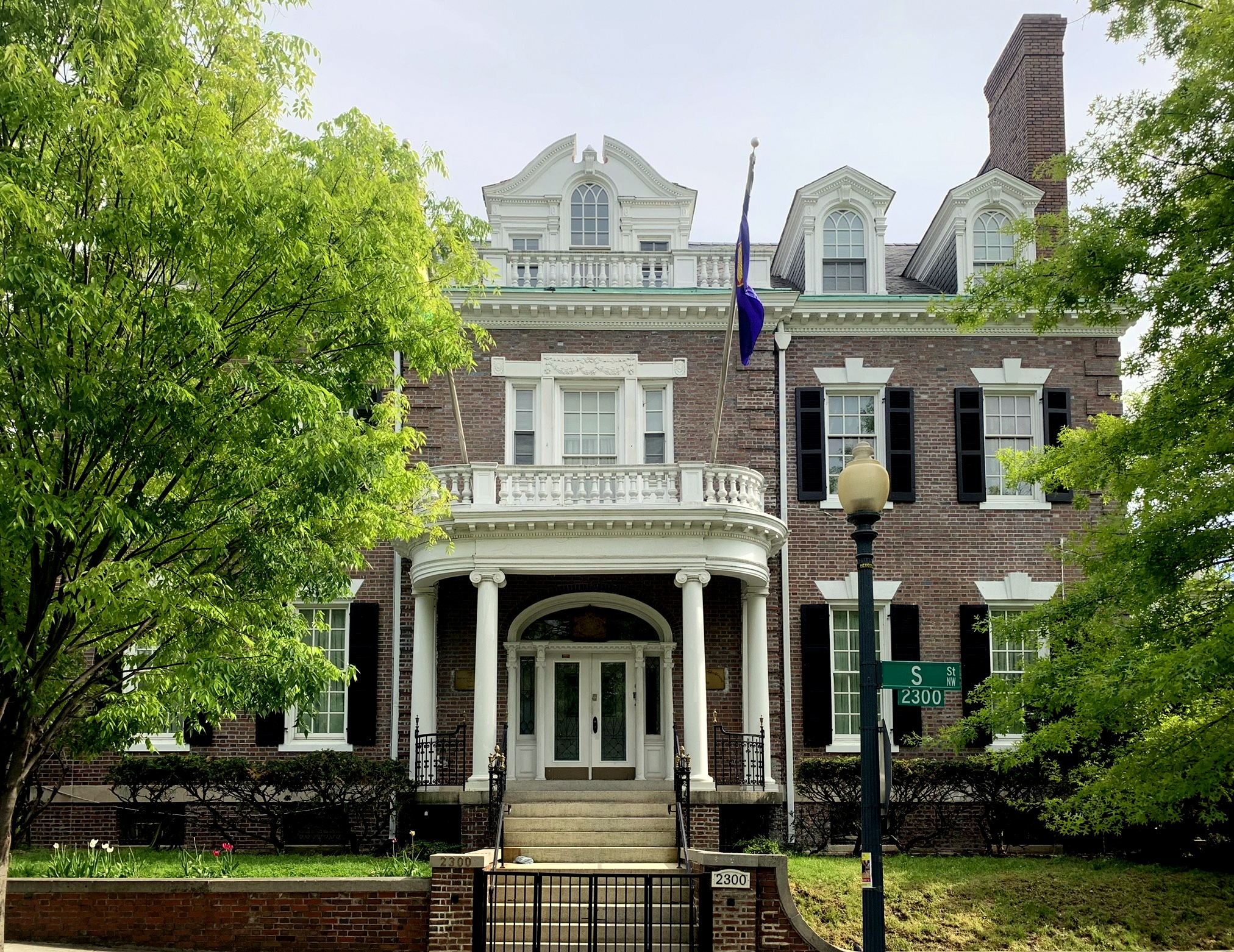
Embassy in Washington, D.C.

== See also ==
- Foreign relations of Myanmar
- List of diplomatic missions in Myanmar
- Visa policy of Myanmar
