= List of diplomatic missions in Myanmar =

This is a list of diplomatic missions in Myanmar.

In November 2005, the Myanmar government transferred its seat from Yangon to Naypyidaw. At present, the former capital of Yangon hosts 42 embassies. Although the government has been encouraging other nations to move their Embassies to Naypyidaw, the new capital is yet to host any embassies which all remain in Yangon. Other countries have ambassadors accredited to Myanmar, with most being resident in elsewhere, usually in either New Delhi or Bangkok.

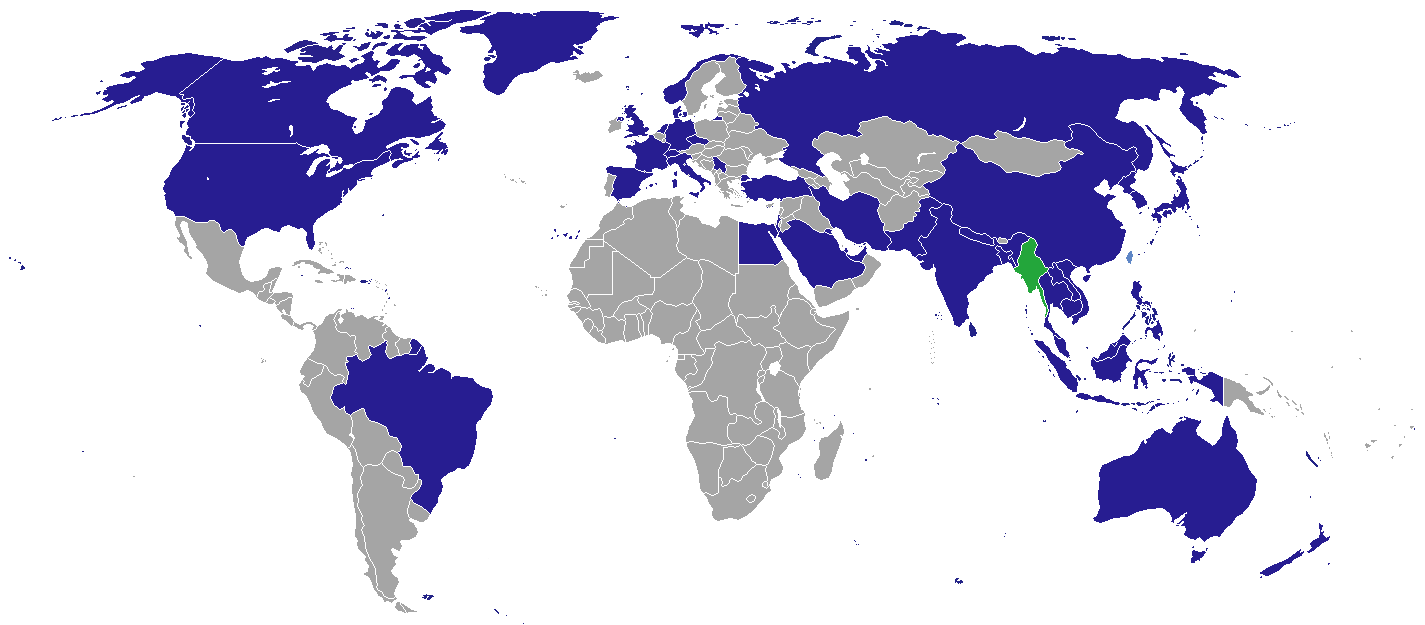
Map of diplomatic missions in Myanmar

== Diplomatic missions ==
=== Embassies in Yangon ===
1. Australia
2. Bangladesh
3. Brazil
4. Brunei
5. Canada
6. Cambodia
7. China
8. Czech Republic
9. Denmark
10. Egypt
11. France
12. Germany
13. India
14. Indonesia
15. Israel
16. Italy
17. Japan
18. Kuwait
19. Laos
20. Malaysia
21. Netherlands
22. Nepal
23. North Korea
24. Norway
25. New Zealand
26. Pakistan
27. Philippines
28. Qatar
29. Russia
30. Saudi Arabia
31. Serbia
32. Singapore
33. South Korea
34. Sri Lanka
35. Switzerland
36. Thailand
37. Timor-Leste
38. Turkey
39. United Arab Emirates
40. United Kingdom
41. United States
42. Vietnam

=== Embassies in Naypyidaw ===
1. Belarus

=== Other missions or delegations ===
- European Union (Delegation)
- Spain (Embassy office)
- Taiwan (Economic & Cultural Office)

== Consular missions ==
=== Mandalay ===
- China (Consulate-General)
- India

=== Sittwe ===
- India

== Non-Resident Embassies accredited to Myanmar ==
=== Resident in Bangkok, Thailand ===
1. Argentina
2. Austria
3. Bahrain
4. Belgium
5. Bhutan
6. Chile
7. Colombia
8. Cuba
9. Finland
10. Greece
11. Holy See
12. Hungary
13. Iran
14. Ireland
15. Kazakhstan
16. Kenya
17. Luxembourg
18. Mongolia
19. Morocco
20. Nigeria
21. Peru
22. Poland
23. Portugal
24. Romania
25. Slovakia
26. South Africa
27. Spain
28. Sweden
29. Ukraine

=== Resident in Beijing, China ===
1. Albania
2. Chad
3. Sudan

=== Resident in Hanoi, Vietnam ===
1. Algeria
2. Angola
3. Bulgaria
4. Haiti
5. Nicaragua
6. Oman
7. Venezuela

=== Resident in Kuala Lumpur, Malaysia ===
1. Azerbaijan
2. Croatia
3. Georgia
4. Ghana
5. Senegal

=== Resident in New Delhi, India ===
1. Cyprus
2. Estonia
3. Gambia
4. Guinea
5. Malawi
6. Mauritius
7. Seychelles
8. Syria
9. Zimbabwe

=== Resident in Tokyo, Japan ===
1. Benin
2. Ethiopia
3. Marshall Islands

=== Resident elsewhere ===
1. Fiji (Seoul)
2. Mexico (Singapore)

== Closed missions ==
- Iran (Yangon, embassy)
- Bangladesh (Sittwe, consulate)
- Sweden (Yangon, embassy section office) (Note: Established in 2014 as a section office of the Swedish Embassy in Bangkok, Thailand.)

== See also ==
- Foreign relations of Myanmar
- List of diplomatic missions of Myanmar
- Visa requirements for Myanmar citizens
