= Foreign relations of Myanmar =

Myanmar (formerly Burma) has full diplomatic relations with 126 countries out of 192 United Nation Members States. The country has generally maintained warmer relations with near states and is a member of the Association of Southeast Asian Nations. The external world's relations with Myanmar have often been a function of its domestic politics and a reactive perception towards its political developments. After the 8888 Uprising in 1988, the country's relation with Western countries deteriorated significantly, while relations with Asian powers remained mixed. After incursions by the Kuomintang in Burma, Myanmar's elite developed a distrust of foreign powers, conscious of the country's relative inability to determine its own relations and remain non-aligned during the Cold War.

== Diplomatic relations ==
List of countries which Myanmar maintains diplomatic relations with:

	Country	Date
1	United Kingdom	7 July 1947
2	Pakistan	1 August 1947
3	United States	19 September 1947
4	Netherlands	22 December 1947
5	India	4 January 1948
6	Russia	18 February 1948
7	France	28 February 1948
8	Thailand	24 August 1948
9	Sri Lanka	7 June 1949
10	Indonesia	27 December 1949
11	China	8 June 1950
12	Italy	24 November 1950
13	Serbia	29 December 1950
14	Austria	9 July 1953
15	Israel	13 July 1953
16	Australia	1 August 1953
17	Egypt	8 August 1953
18	Belgium	19 September 1953
19	Finland	22 July 1954
20	Germany	3 August 1954
21	Japan	1 December 1954
22	Denmark	22 April 1955
23	Laos	12 July 1955
24	Cambodia	12 July 1955
25	Poland	11 November 1955
26	Czech Republic	3 February 1956
27	Sweden	22 February 1956
28	Hungary	5 March 1956
29	Romania	15 March 1956
30	Bulgaria	16 May 1956
31	Norway	18 May 1956
32	Iraq	23 July 1956
33	Philippines	30 July 1956
34	Switzerland	19 September 1956
35	Mongolia	28 September 1956
36	Afghanistan	8 November 1956
37	Malaysia	1 March 1958
38	Greece	20 March 1958
39	Canada	9 August 1958
40	Turkey	2 September 1958
41	New Zealand	15 November 1958
42	Nepal	3 March 1960
43	Singapore	12 August 1966
44	Spain	11 March 1967
45	Iran	8 August 1968
46	Algeria	15 November 1968
47	Maldives	15 January 1970
48	Nigeria	24 January 1970
49	Bangladesh	21 March 1972
50	Syria	15 June 1972
51	Argentina	28 February 1975
52	South Korea	19 May 1975
53	North Korea	19 May 1975
54	Vietnam	28 May 1975
55	Mexico	1 October 1976
56	Mauritania	5 October 1976
57	Cuba	12 October 1976
58	Portugal	14 November 1976
59	Albania	15 December 1976
60	Costa Rica	8 March 1977
61	Morocco	31 July 1978
62	Mauritius	30 December 1978
63	Chile	22 April 1982
64	Panama	15 July 1982
65	Brazil	1 September 1982
66	Cyprus	15 July 1985
67	Vanuatu	28 January 1987
68	Colombia	28 November 1988
69	Peru	28 August 1989
70	Venezuela	20 November 1990
71	Papua New Guinea	24 July 1991
72	Slovakia	1 January 1993
73	Brunei	21 September 1993
74	Ghana	13 January 1995
75	South Africa	20 April 1995
76	Kenya	26 September 1997
77	Kuwait	16 December 1998
78	Ukraine	19 January 1999
79	Azerbaijan	3 August 1999
80	Georgia	16 August 1999
81	Turkmenistan	26 August 1999
82	Croatia	3 September 1999
83	Belarus	22 September 1999
84	Kazakhstan	23 September 1999
85	Tajikistan	29 September 1999
86	Jamaica	6 December 1999
87	Kyrgyzstan	9 November 2000
88	Uzbekistan	8 February 2001
89	Uruguay	22 February 2001
90	North Macedonia	9 July 2003
91	Ireland	10 February 2004
92	Sudan	20 May 2004
93	Saudi Arabia	25 August 2004
94	Qatar	26 September 2005
95	Timor-Leste	26 September 2006
96	Montenegro	27 November 2006
97	Slovenia	18 December 2006
98	Andorra	11 February 2009
99	Zimbabwe	27 August 2009
100	Bahrain	10 November 2009
101	Fiji	10 May 2010
102	Oman	14 December 2010
103	Gambia	13 January 2011
104	Bosnia and Herzegovina	25 August 2011
105	Malawi	30 January 2012
106	Bhutan	1 February 2012
107	Luxembourg	31 July 2012
108	Latvia	26 September 2012
109	Estonia	26 September 2012
110	Iceland	19 December 2012
111	Armenia	31 January 2013
112	Angola	19 September 2013
113	Lithuania	8 October 2013
114	Ethiopia	28 December 2015
115	Malta	5 April 2017
116	Ecuador	6 April 2017
117	Marshall Islands	21 April 2017
118	Liberia	5 May 2017
—	Holy See	5 May 2017
119	Guinea	6 June 2017
120	Seychelles	12 July 2017
121	Benin	2 July 2019
122	Togo	31 July 2019
123	Nicaragua	6 August 2020
124	United Arab Emirates	9 November 2020
125	Guinea-Bissau	6 March 2023
126	Somalia	9 January 2026

== Europe and America ==
The United States has placed broad sanctions on Myanmar because of the military crackdown in 1988 and the military regime's refusal to honour the election results of the 1990 People's Assembly election. Similarly, the European Union has placed embargoes on Myanmar, including an arms embargo, cessation of trade preferences, and suspension of all aid with the exception of humanitarian aid.

US and European government sanctions against the military government, alongside boycotts and other types of direct pressure on corporations by western supporters of the Burmese democracy movement, have resulted in the withdrawal from Myanmar of most US and many European companies. However, several Western companies remain due to loopholes in the sanctions. Asian corporations have generally remained willing to continue investing in Myanmar and to initiate new investments, particularly in natural resource extraction.

The French oil company TotalEnergies is able to operate the Yadana natural gas pipeline from Myanmar to Thailand despite the European Union's sanctions on Myanmar. TotalEnergies is currently the subject of a lawsuit in French and Belgian courts for the condoning and use of Burman civilian slavery to construct the named pipeline. Experts say that the human rights abuses along the gas pipeline are the direct responsibility of TotalEnergies and its American partner Chevron Corporation with aid and implementation by the Tatmadaw. Prior to its acquisition by Chevron, Unocal settled a similar human rights lawsuit for a reported multimillion-dollar amount. There remains active debate as to the extent to which the American-led sanctions have had adverse effects on the civilian population or on the military rulers.

=== Armenia ===
Both countries established diplomatic relations on 31 January 2013.

=== Belarus ===
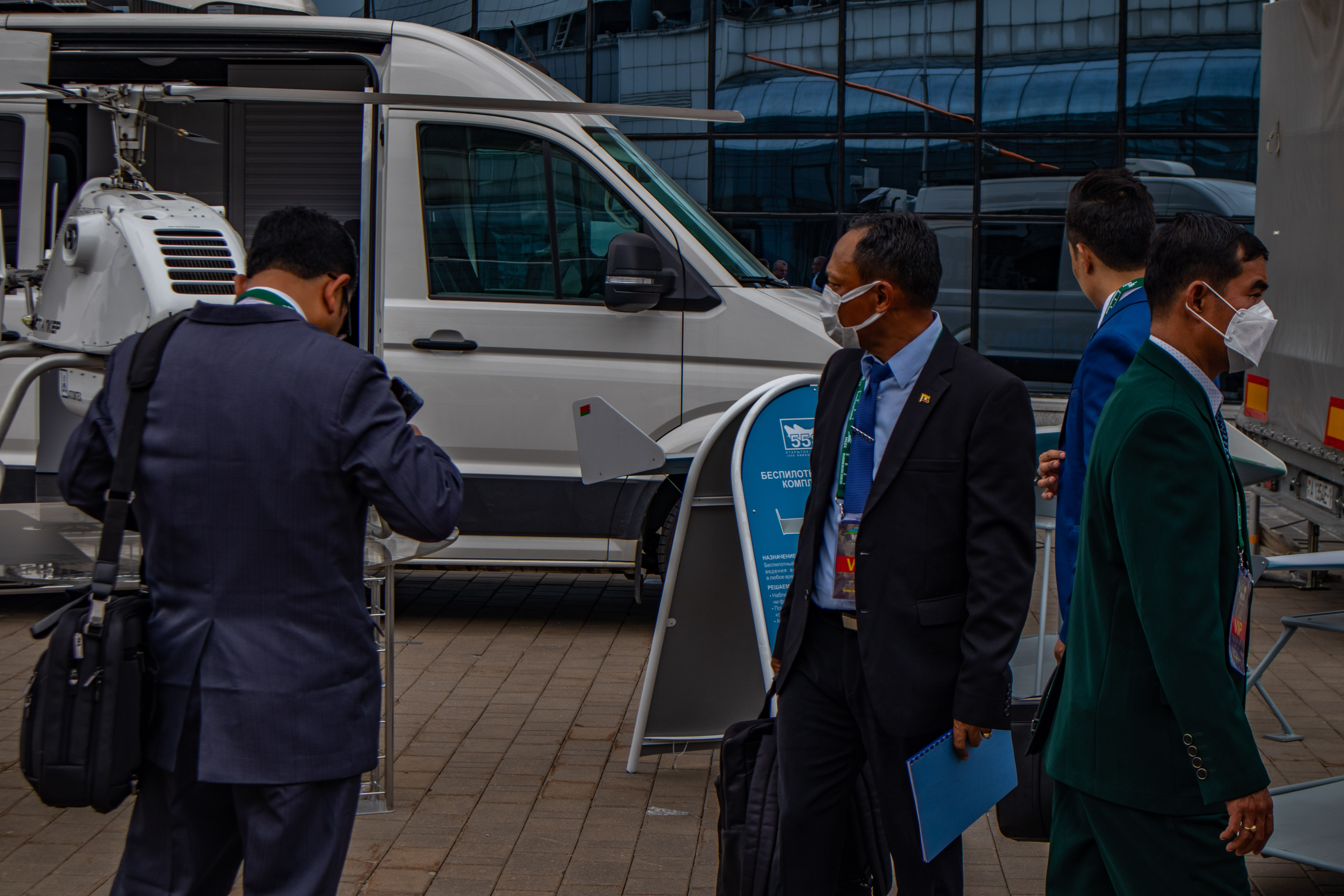
Myanmar delegation at MILEX-2021 military exhibition. Minsk, Belarus

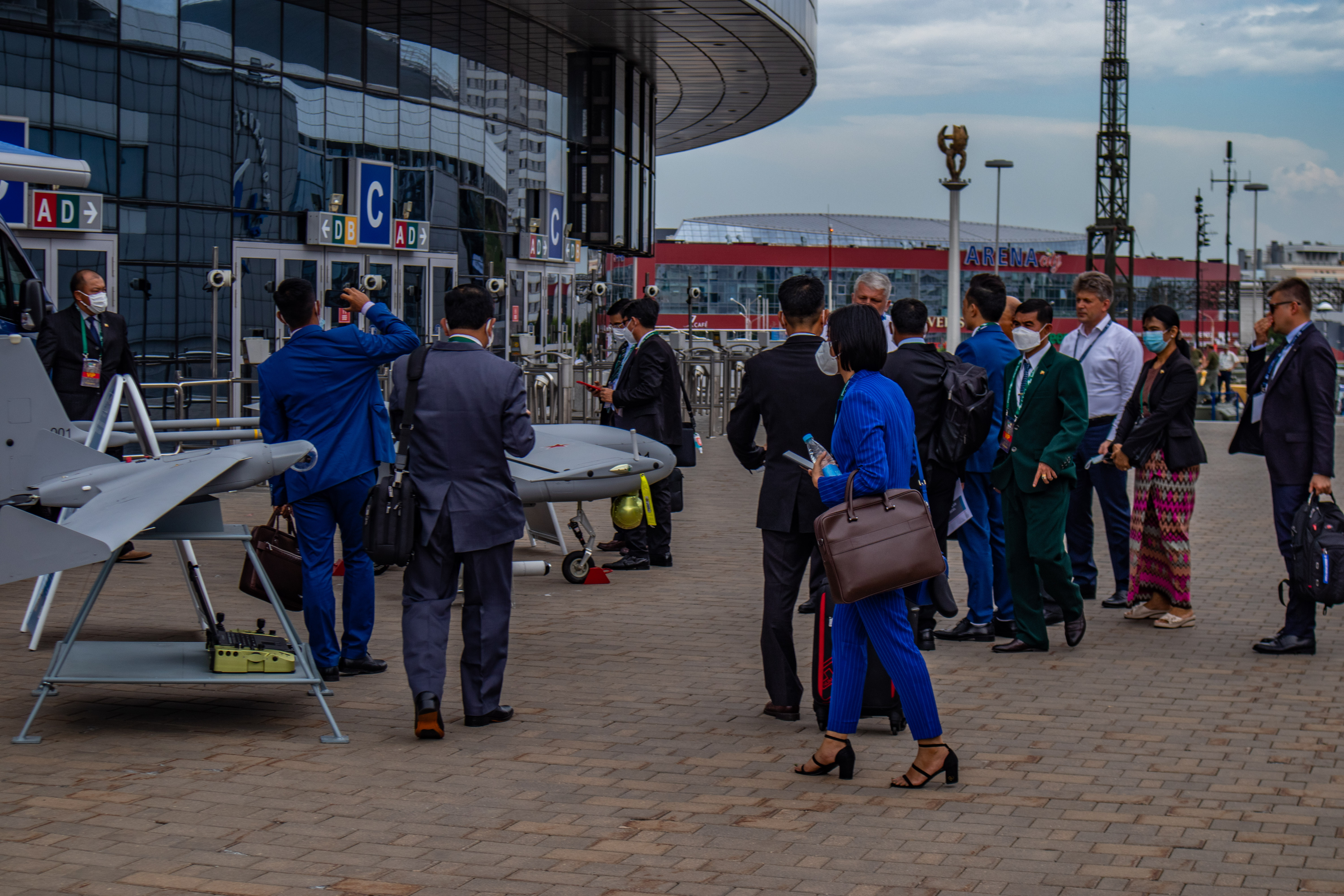
Myanmar delegation at MILEX-2021 military exhibition. Minsk, Belarus

Belarus and Myanmar established diplomatic relations on 22 September 1999. In December 2011, prime minister of Belarus Mikhail Myasnikovich made on official visit to Myanmar.

In 2021, Belarus was the only country to vote against UN General Assembly resolution calling Myanmar military to stop violence, release arrested protesters and restore democracy. It was assumed that Belarusian support for Myanmar military junta was caused by long history of arms trade with Myanmar Army.

=== Denmark ===
Myanmar is represented in Denmark through its embassy in the United Kingdom, and Denmark is represented in Myanmar through its embassy in Thailand. Diplomatic relations were established in 1955. Relations between the two countries are friendly, but economically, Denmark has the "worst" trade with Myanmar in the European Union.

Development assistance to Myanmar is a top priority of the Danish International Development Agency's engagement in Southeast Asia. 93 million DKK was given to education and healthcare projects. Danish development assistance has focused on promoting democracy and human rights. Denmark was one of the first countries to respond to cyclone Nargis by providing humanitarian assistance to Myanmar. Three Diseases Fund was founded in 2006, and Denmark joined in 2009. Three Diseases Fund helps Myanmar fight HIV and AIDS, and has assisted with 73 million dollars.

==== Burmese Consul incident ====
In 1996, the consul in Myanmar for Denmark, James Leander Nichols, was sentenced to three years in jail. The sentence was for illegal possession of two facsimile machines and a telephone switchboard. Two months later, he died in prison. Despite Danish insistence, Burmese authorities refused to allow an independent autopsy. Soon after, the European Union, with Canada, called for a United Nations gathering on the democratisation process.

=== Hungary ===
In June 2019, Aung San Suu Kyi visited Hungary and meet with the Prime Minister Viktor Orbán. "The two leaders highlighted that one of the greatest challenges at present for both countries and their respective regions – south-east Asia and Europe – is migration", read a statement released after their meeting. it also said "They noted that both regions have seen the emergence of the issue of co-existence with continuously growing Muslim populations".

=== Ireland ===
The Government of Ireland established diplomatic relations with Myanmar on a non-resident basis on 10 February 2004. The Irish Government was still concerned about the arbitrary detention of the opposition leader Aung San Suu Kyi. Burma Action Ireland is a pro-democracy group that freely operates in the Republic of Ireland.

Ireland supported a UN commission of inquiry and international level monitoring of Myanmar after 2008, as part of their efforts to support democracy and human rights movements in Myanmar. This became public knowledge after official papers were leaked in September 2010.

=== France ===
Franco-Burmese relations go back to the early 18th century, as the French East India Company attempted to extend its influence into Southeast Asia. French involvement started in 1729 when it built a shipyard in the city of Syriam. The 1740 revolt of the Mon against Burmese rule, however, forced the French to depart in 1742. They were able to return to Siam in 1751 when the Mon requested French assistance against the Burmese. A French envoy, Sieur de Bruno was sent to evaluate the situation and help in the defence against the Burmese. French warships were sent to support the Mon rebellion, but in vain. In 1756, the Burmese under Alaungpaya vanquished the Mon. Many French were captured and incorporated into the Burmese Army as an elite gunner corps, under Chevalier Milard. In 1769, official contacts resumed when a trade treaty was signed between King Hsinbyushin and the French East India Company.

Soon after, however, France was convulsed by the French Revolution and Napoleonic Wars, thus allowing overwhelming British influence in Burma. French contacts with Burma, effectively a British colony, became almost non-existent. Instead, from the second half of the 19th century, France concentrated on the establishment of French Indochina and the conflicts with China leading to the Sino-French War. Following the end of World War II, ambassador-level diplomatic relationships between France and Burma were established in 1948, soon after the Burmese nation became an independent republic on 4 January 1948, as Union of Burma, with Sao Shwe Thaik as its first President and U Nu as its first Prime Minister.

=== Serbia ===
- Both countries have established diplomatic relations in 1950.
- A number of bilateral agreements in various fields have been concluded and are in force between both countries.

=== United Kingdom ===
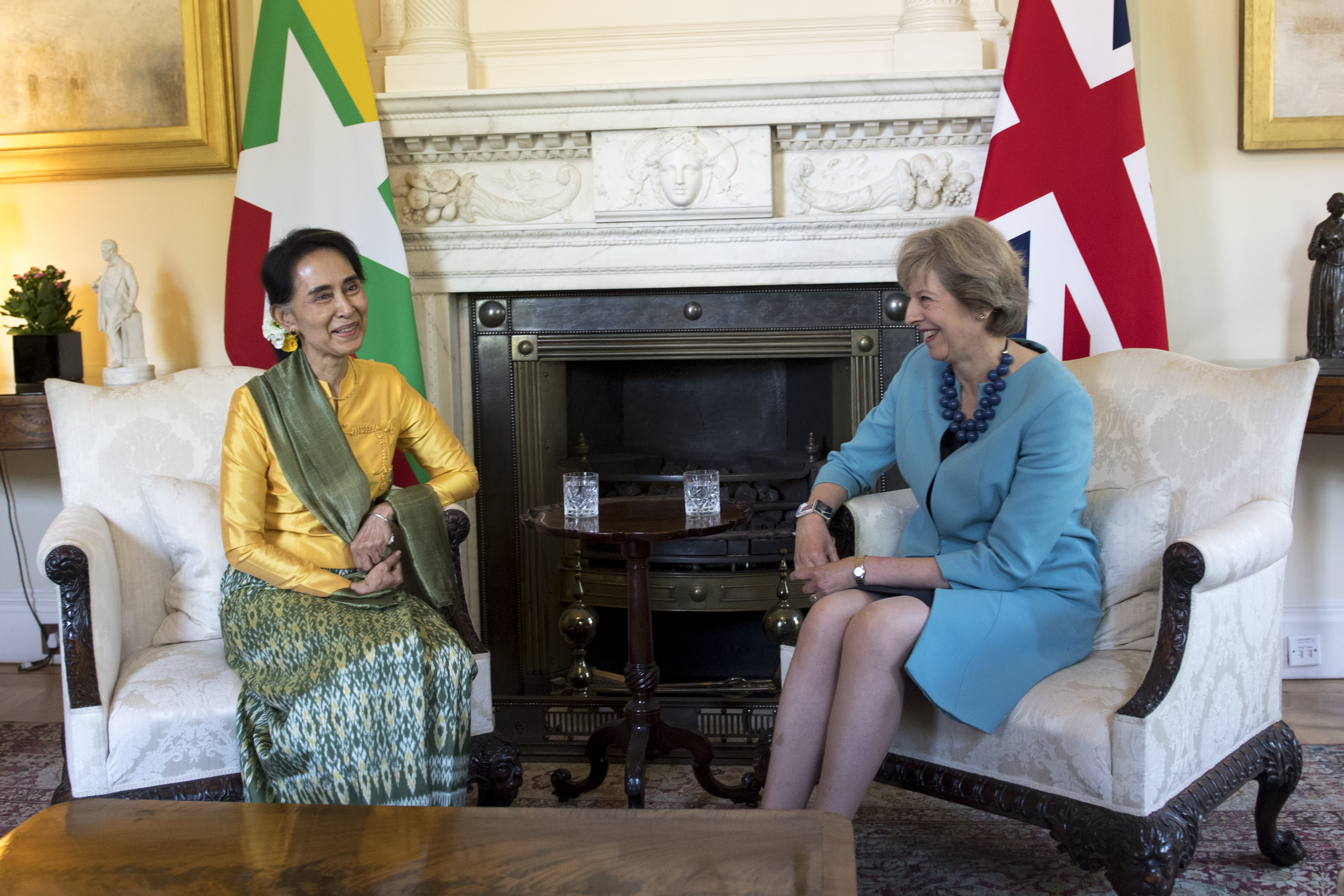
Myanmar State Counsellor Aung San Suu Kyi with British Prime Minister Theresa May in 10 Downing Street, September 2016.

Myanmar established diplomatic relations with the United Kingdom on 7 July 1947.

- Myanmar maintains an embassy in London.
- The United Kingdom is accredited to Myanmar through its embassy in Yangon.

The UK governed Myanmar from 1824 to 1942 and 1945 until 1948, when Myanmar achieved full independence.

Both countries share common membership of the United Nations, and the World Trade Organization. Bilaterally the two countries have a Development Partnership, and a Double Taxation Agreement.

=== United States ===
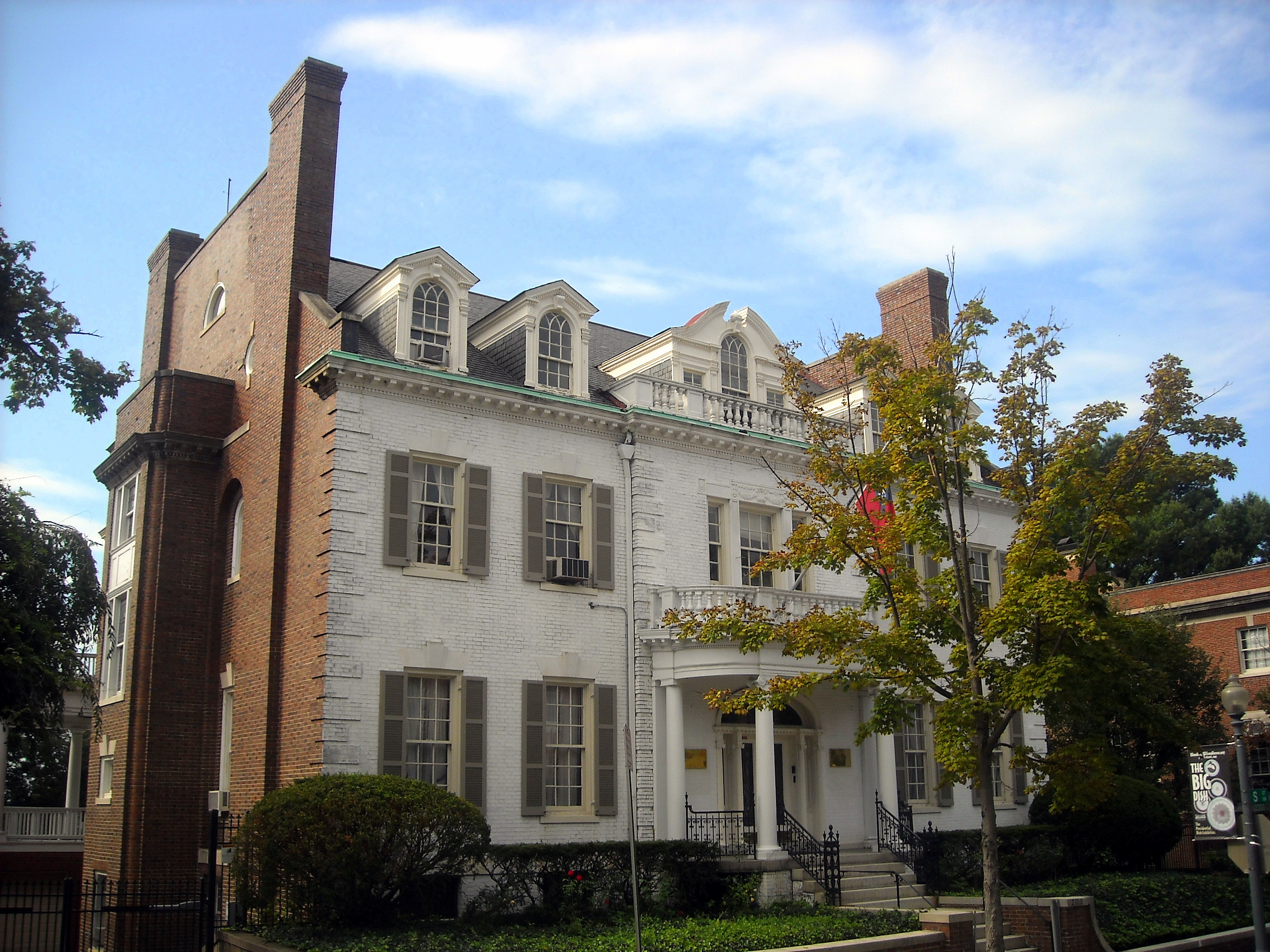
Embassy of Myanmar in Washington, D.C.

The political relations between the United States of America and Myanmar began to face major problems following the 1988 military coup and the junta's outbursts of repression against pro-democracy activists. Subsequent repression, including that of protestors in 2007 and 2021, further strain the relationship. In the 2010s, following signs of democratisation and economic liberalisation, the United States lifted sanctions calling for the mending of US relations with Myanmar. The US also re-established ambassador-level relations with Myanmar in 2012 for the first time since 1990. However, the US re-imposed targeted sanctions following the 2017 Rohingya genocide and the 2021 myanmar coup d'état, focusing on individuals and companies involved in atrocities and human rights violations.

==== Historical relations ====
In 1988, the United States downgraded its level of representation in Myanmar from Ambassador to Chargé d'Affaires after the Burmese government's lethal crackdown on the 8888 Uprising and its failure to honour the results of the 1990 election. The United States remains one of a few countries to still not recognise the 1989 name change from Burma to Myanmar arguing that the change was made without the consent of the people by the illegitimate 1989 government. The US upgraded its representation back in 2012, appointing Derek Mitchel as Ambassador.

Massachusetts attempted to place sanctions against Burma on its own in 1996 but the concept proved to be contradictory to the US Constitution.

The US government imposed broad sanctions on Myanmar including the 2003 Burma Freedom and Democracy Act, which banned all imports and export of financial services with Myanmar, froze certain Burmese financial institutions' access and increased visa restrictions for Burmese officials. In 2007, the US imposed additional sanctions, including freezing assets of 25 high-ranking officials Burmese government officials through Executive Orders.

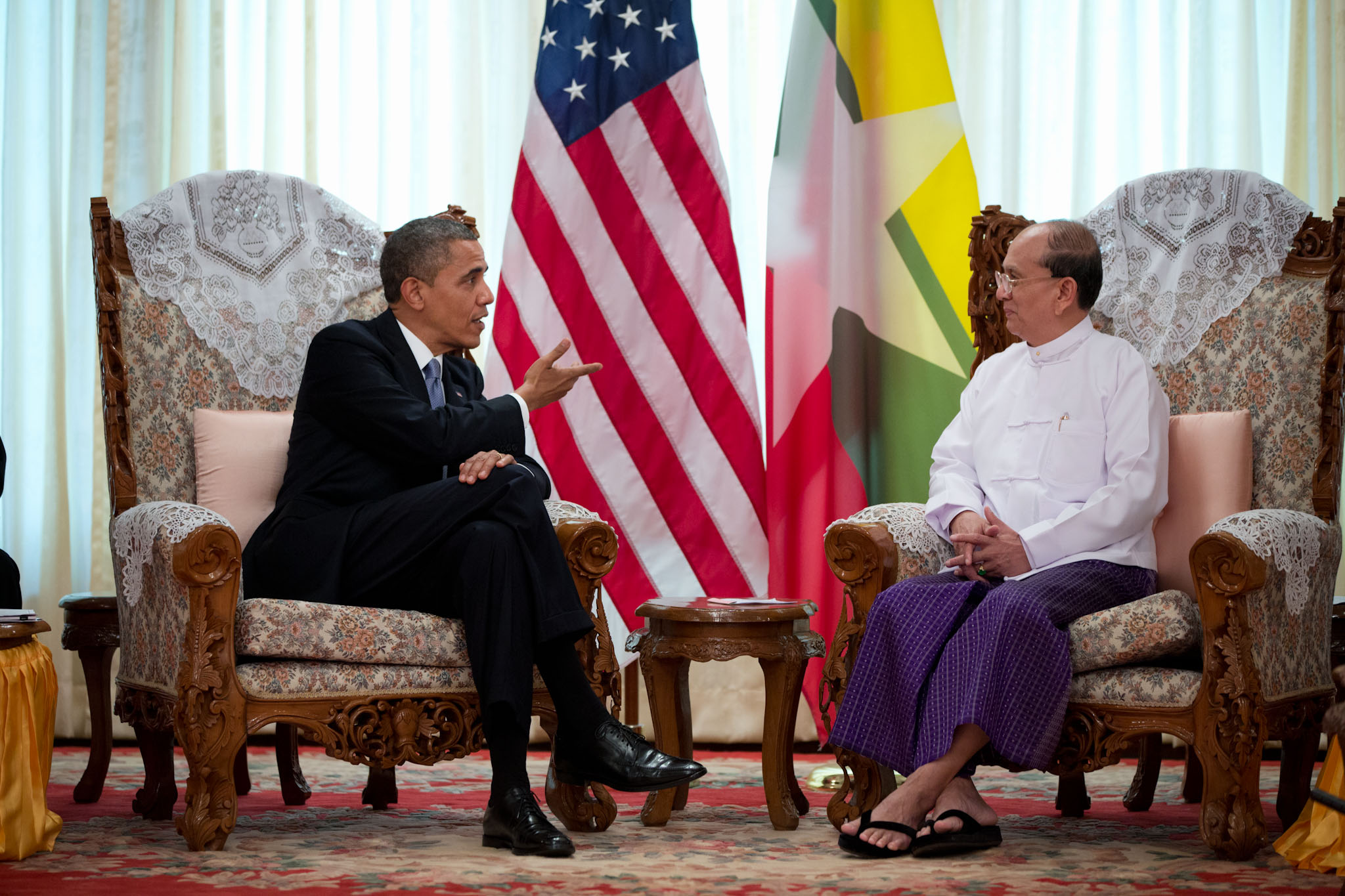
Thein Sein meets US President Barack Obama in Yangon/Rangoon, the former capital, on 19 November 2012

In 2011, US Secretary of State, Hillary Clinton, visited Myanmar, the first by a Secretary of State since 1955. Clinton met with President Thein Sein and with then-democracy activist Aung San Suu Kyi In 2012, the Clinton announced the US will exchange ambassadors with Myanmar, after a landmark Burmese political prisoner amnesty. President Barack Obama nominated Derek Mitchell to serve as US Ambassador to Myanmar.

In July 2012 the United States formally reduced sanctions against Myanmar. and "targeted easing" of sanctions allowing minor US investment.

In 2013, Thein Sein visited the US White House to discuss Myanmar's reforms with President Obama. The two countries later signed a bilateral trade and investment framework agreement.

==== Recent relations ====
In October 2017 the United States withdrew military aid to Myanmar units responsible for the displacement of Rohingya in the Rohingya crisis. The US later imposed a blacklist on Maung Maung Soe, chief of the Myanmar army's Western Command responsible for the violence, and commanders directly involved. The United States also provided humanitarian aid to displaced Rohingya refugees. In 2022, the United States formally recognised the Rohingya genocide.

In February 2021, a military coup led by Min Aung Hlaing overthrew Aung San Suu Kyi in Myanmar. The United States condemned the coup and imposed sanctions on Myanmar military leaders and their business associates. In July 2022, the new junta of Myanmar executed four political prisoners, which was met with condemnation from the G7 nations, including the United States. The State Department further pressed China to influence the situation.

In August 2021, as the protests escalated into greater conflict, two Myanmar citizens in the United States were arrested over an alleged plot to hire hitmen to assassinate Kyaw Moe Tun, Myanmar's representative to the United Nations in New York.

In December 2022, The BURMA Act was passed in Congress authorising sanctions on individuals involved in the coup d'état, providing support to civil society and humanitarian assistance as well as creating a position within the State Department dedicated to democracy in Burma.

==== US activities in Myanmar ====
On 10 September 2007, the Burmese Government accused the CIA of assassinating a rebel Karen commander from the Karen National Union who wanted to negotiate with the military government.

In 2011, The Guardian newspaper published leaked diplomatic cables information that revealed that the US funded some civil society groups in Myanmar who eventually forced the government to suspend the controversial Chinese Myitsone Dam on the Irrawaddy river.

According to media reports in 2010, the Embassy of the United States in Yangon is the site of an electronic surveillance facility used to monitor telephones and communications networks jointly run by the Special Collection Service.

==== Diplomatic missions ====
The US Embassy in Myanmar is located in Yangon, whilst the Burmese diplomatic representation to America is based in Washington, D.C.

=== Russia ===
Bilateral relations with the Russian Federation are among the strongest enjoyed by a largely isolated Burma. Russia had established diplomatic relations with Myanmar at independence and these continued after the fall of the Soviet Union. China and Russia once vetoed a UN Security Council resolution condemning the Burmese government. Today Russia, along with China, remains part of the UN Security Council, which occasionally shields Myanmar from global pressure and criticism, and remains a strong Tatmadaw ally.

Russia maintains an embassy in Yangon whilst Myanmar maintains one in Moscow.

==== Nuclear centre deal ====
In 2007 Russia and Myanmar engaged in a deal regarding Myanmar's nuclear programme. According to the press release, Russia and Myanmar shall construct a nuclear research centre that 'will comprise a 10 MW light-water reactor working on 20%-enriched uranium-235, an activation analysis laboratory, a medical isotope production laboratory, silicon doping system, nuclear waste treatment and burial facilities'.

==== Diplomatic missions ====
- (in English, Burmese, and Russian) Embassy of Russia in Yangon

== Association of Southeast Asian Nations ==
Myanmar is a member of the Association of Southeast Asian Nations (ASEAN) and part of ASEAN+3 and the East Asia Summit. Myanmar agreed to relinquish its turn to hold the rotating ASEAN presidency in 2006 due to others member states' concern of its previous democratic situation.

ASEAN has announced that it shall not provide defence for Myanmar at any international forum regarding the authoritarian junta's refusal to restore democracy. In April 2007, the Malaysian Foreign Ministry parliamentary secretary Ahmad Shabery Cheek said that Malaysia and other ASEAN members had decided not to defend Myanmar if the country was raised for discussion at any international conference. "Now Myanmar has to defend itself if it was bombarded at any international forum," he said when winding up a debate at committee stage for the Foreign Ministry. He was replying to queries from Opposition Leader Lim Kit Siang on the next course of action to be taken by Malaysia and Asean with the Burmese military junta. Lim had said Malaysia must play a proactive role in pursuing regional initiatives to bring about a change in Myanmar and support efforts to bring the situation in Myanmar to the UN Security Council's attention. Recently, ASEAN did take a stronger tone with Burma, particularly regards to the detention of now-released Aung San Suu Kyi.

=== Brunei ===
Brunei has an embassy in Yangon, and Myanmar has an embassy in Gadong. The relations have been established since 21 September 1993.

=== Malaysia ===
The relations between the two countries were established on 1 March 1957 and the first Myanmar mission at the legation level was set up in Kuala Lumpur in June 1959 and later raised to the embassy level.

=== Thailand ===
Relations between Myanmar and Thailand focus mainly on economic issues and trade. There is sporadic conflict with Thailand over the alignment of the border. Recently, Prime Minister Abhisit Vejjajiva made it clear that dialogue encouraging political change is a priority for Thailand, but not through economic sanctions. He also publicised intentions to help reconstruct temples damaged in the aftermath of Cyclone Nargis. However, there were tensions over detained opposition leader Aung San Suu Kyi, with Thailand calling for her release. She was released in 2010. In the Thaksin Shinawatra administration, relations have been characterised by conflicts and confrontations. Border disputes are now coming more prominent and Thailand as disturbed by the imprisonment of Myanmar's dissident Aung San Suu Kyi.

Myanmar has diplomatic offices in Bangkok whilst Thailand maintains an embassy in Yangon.

=== Philippines ===
Philippines established relations with Myanmar in 1956 and recognised its political name Myanmar. In 2012, Myanmar ranked 3rd to the lowest among the Philippines' trading partners in ASEAN. It only fared better than Cambodia and Laos. The Philippines and Myanmar traded only $47.07 million in 2012. The Philippines grant Burmese citizens visa-free access for 30 days. Myanmar on the other hand signed the visa exemption for Filipinos on 5 December 2013 effective 4 January 2014. The agreement allows Filipinos to stay in Myanmar up to 14 days visa-free.

=== Cambodia ===
Burma accorded de jure recognition to the newly sovereign state of Cambodia on 16 August 1954. On 10 January 1955, Burma and Cambodia agreed to establish diplomatic relations, which were maintained with the Lon Nol government after the deposition of Norodom Sihanouk in March 1970. Diplomatic recognition was later transferred to Democratic Kampuchea when Lon Nol's Khmer Republic was overthrown in April 1975.

=== Indonesia ===
Burma recognised the Republic of Indonesia as de jure sovereign power of the archipelago on 27 December 1949. A five-year treaty of friendship was signed in Rangoon on 31 March 1951. Indonesian President Sukarno paid his first visit to Rangoon on his way home from a journey to India and Pakistan in 1950.

=== Singapore ===
Singapore established diplomatic relations with the Union of Burma in 1966. However, it was only in May 1984 that the Embassy was opened in Yangon.

Singapore is one of Myanmar's top investors and trading partners. In the past, Singapore faced scrutiny from Burmese democracy activists, exacerbated by Lee Kuan Yew's comments in 1996. After the 2021 Myanmar coup, Singapore adopted stronger stances against the military regime and pressuring the regime to cooperate with ASEAN's peace plan. However, Singapore continues to be a major source of equipment for the junta's weapons factories.

== East Asia ==
=== China ===
The People's Republic of China had poor relations with Myanmar until the late 1980s. Between 1967 and 1970, Burma broke relations with Beijing because of the latter's support for the Communist Party of Burma (CPB). Deng Xiaoping visited Yangon in 1978 and withdrew support for the long running insurgency of the Communist Party of Burma. However, in the early 1950s Burma enjoyed a hot-and-cold relationship with China. Burma's Ba U and U Nu lobbied for China's entry as a permanent member into the UN Security Council, but denounced the invasion of Tibet. China and Burma have had many border disputes, dating long before the British annexation of Burma. The last border dispute occurred in 1956, when the People's Liberation Army occupied disputed areas in northern Burma, but both sides agreed to resolve the issue through negotiations. A border agreement was reached in 1960. In the late 1960s, due to Ne Win's propaganda that the PRC was to blame for crop failures, and the increasing number of ethnic Chinese students supporting Chairman Mao Zedong, by carrying the Quotatians from his books, anti-Chinese riots broke out in June 1967. At the same time, many Sino-Burmese were influenced by the Cultural Revolution in China and began to wear Mao badges. Shops and homes were ransacked and burned. The Chinese government heavily berated the Burmese government and started a war of words, but no other actions were taken. The anti-Chinese riots continued till the early 1970s. However, after 1986, China withdrew support for the CPB and began supplying the military junta with the majority of its arms in exchange for increased access to Burmese markets and a rumoured naval base on Coco Islands in the Andaman Sea. China is supposed to have an intelligence gathering station on the Great Coco Island to monitor Indian naval activity and ISRO & DRDO missile and space launch activities. The influx of Chinese arms turned the tide in Myanmar against the ethnic insurgencies, many of which had relied indirectly on Chinese complicity. As a result, the military junta of Myanmar is highly reliant on the Chinese for their currently high level of power. Myanmar maintains diplomatic offices in Beijing and consular offices in Kunming and Hong Kong, whilst the PRC has a diplomatic mission in Yangon and a consulate in Mandalay.

After 2015, China increased considerably its scope of engagement with Myanmar by playing a more active role in the peace process, developing large infrastructure projects and promoting the Belt and Road Initiative (BRI) in the country.

In July 2019, UN ambassadors from 50 countries, including Myanmar, have signed a joint letter to the UNHRC defending China's treatment of Uyghurs and other Muslim minority groups in the Xinjiang region.

=== North Korea ===
Myanmar and North Korea generally enjoy good relations. Myanmar has an embassy in Pyongyang and North Korea has an embassy in Yangon.

==== History ====
Since they both achieved independence in 1948, Burma and North Korea have enjoyed a chequered relationship. Burma expressed diplomatic support for the UN forces during the Korean War, but after the signing of the 1953 armistice it established good working relations with the two Koreas. Consular links with both states were established in 1961 and full diplomatic relations followed in 1975. During the 1960s and 1970s, General Ne Win's government made efforts to balance the competing demands of North Korea and South Korea for recognition, diplomatic support and trade. However, during the late 1970s the relationship with Pyongyang became slightly stronger than that with Seoul, as Ne Win and the Burma Socialist Programme Party forged fraternal ties with Kim Il Sung and the Workers' Party of Korea. (Note: The Burma Socialist Programme Party’s policies favouring economic autarky were seen as being similar to Kim Il-sung’s juche (self-reliance) philosophy)

==== The assassination attempt in 1983 ====
The bilateral relationship with North Korea dramatically collapsed in 1983, after Pyongyang allegedly sent three agents to Yangon to assassinate South Korean President Chun Doo Hwan, who was making a state visit to Burma. Due to a last minute, unannounced change to his schedule, Chun survived the massive bomb attack at the Martyrs' Mausoleum, but 17 South Korean and four Burmese officials, including four Korean Cabinet ministers, were killed. Forty-six others were injured.

There was probably at least one bilateral agreement as early as 2000, but the relationship seemed to reach a major turning point around 2003. In July that year, it was reported that between 15 and 20 North Korean technicians were working at the Monkey Point naval base in Yangon. A UN report released on 1 February 2018 cited North Korean ballistic missile transfers to the Myanmar army.

=== South Korea ===
The Republic of Korea and Burma generally enjoy good relations. Burma has an embassy in Seoul and South Korea has an embassy in Yangon.

=== Taiwan ===
Although Myanmar officially recognises the PRC and not the Republic of China (Taiwan), there is much interaction between the two countries. Many Taiwanese nationals own businesses in Myanmar. There are direct air flights to Taipei. In the absence of diplomatic relations, Myanmar was represented by the Myanmar Trade Office in Taipei, and Taiwan remains represented by the Taipei Economic and Cultural Office in Yangon.

== South Asia ==
=== India ===
Bilateral relations between Myanmar and the Republic of India have improved considerably since 1993, overcoming disagreements related to drug trafficking, the suppression of democracy and the rule of the military junta in Myanmar. Myanmar is situated to the south of the states of Mizoram, Manipur, Nagaland and Arunachal Pradesh in Northeast India. The proximity of the People's Republic of China give strategic importance to Indo-Burmese relations. The Indo-Burmese border stretches over 1,600 kilometers. India is generally friendly with Myanmar, but is concerned by the flow of tribal refugees and the arrest of Aung San Suu Kyi.

As a result of increased Chinese influence in Myanmar as well as the safe haven and arms trafficking occurring along the Indo-Burmese border, India has sought in recent years to refurbish ties with the Union of Burma. Numerous economic arrangements have been established including a roadway connecting the isolated provinces of Northeastern India with Mandalay which opens up trade with China, Myanmar, and gives access to the Burmese ports. Relations between India and Myanmar have been strained in the past however due to India's continuing support for the pro-democracy movement in Myanmar.

In an interview on the BBC, George Fernandes, former Indian Defence Minister and prominent Myanmar critic, said that Coco Island was part of India until it was donated to Myanmar by former Prime Minister of India Jawaharlal Nehru. Coco Island is located at 18 km from the Indian Nicobar Islands.

Myanmar has a fully operating embassy based in New Delhi and India has one in Yangon, the former capital of Myanmar. Like the PRC, the Republic of India maintains a Consulate-General in Mandalay.

The relationship between Myanmar and India has been complicated by allegations that India’s intelligence agency, the Research and Analysis Wing (RAW), has engaged in covert operations to influence Myanmar's internal politics. Reports suggest that RAW has established ties with various ethnic insurgent groups in Myanmar, particularly in the northeastern states bordering India. This has raised concerns that India might be conducting a proxy war to exert control over Myanmar's government and counterbalance Chinese influence in the region. By supporting these insurgent groups, India aims to secure its own border and prevent the spillover of conflict into its northeastern states. However, this strategy has led to accusations of interference in Myanmar’s sovereignty. The military junta in Myanmar views such actions as destabilising, leading to further strain in diplomatic relations. These covert operations have created a complex web of alliances and enmities, as India navigates its interests while attempting to maintain a semblance of cooperative relations with the Myanmar government. Consequently, the use of proxy forces has not only complicated India's relationship with Myanmar but has also heightened tensions within the region, raising questions about long-term stability and governance in Myanmar itself.

==== Economic relations ====
India is the largest market for Burmese exports, buying about US$220 million worth of goods in 2000; India's exports to Myanmar stood at US$75.36 million. India is Myanmar's 4th largest trading partner after Thailand, the PRC and Singapore, and second largest export market after Thailand, absorbing 25 per cent of its total exports. India is also the seventh most important source of Myanmar's imports. The governments of India and Myanmar had set a target of achieving $1 billion and bilateral trade reached US$650 million by 2006. The Indian government has worked to extend air, land and sea routes to strengthen trade links with Myanmar and establish a gas pipeline. While the involvement of India's private sector has been low and growing at a slow pace, both governments are proceeding to enhance co-operation in agriculture, telecommunications, information technology, steel, oil, natural gas, hydrocarbons and food processing. The bilateral border trade agreement of 1994 provides for border trade to be carried out from three designated border points, one each in Manipur, Mizoram and Nagaland.

On 13 February 2001 India and Myanmar inaugurated a major 160 kilometre highway, called the Indo-Myanmar Friendship Road, built mainly by the Indian Army's Border Roads Organisation and aimed to provide a major strategic and commercial transport route connecting North-East India, and South Asia as a whole, to Southeast Asia.

India and Myanmar have agreed to a four-lane, 3200 km triangular highway connecting India, Myanmar and Thailand. The route, which is expected to be completed by sometime during 2018, will run from India's northeastern states into Myanmar, where over 1,600 km of roads will be built or improved. The first phase connecting Guwahati to Mandalay is set to complete by 2016. This will eventually be extended to Cambodia and Vietnam. This is aimed at creating a new economic zone ranging from Kolkata on the Bay of Bengal to Ho Chi Minh City on the South China Sea.

==== Operation Leech ====
Operation Leech is the name given to an armed operation on the Indo-Burmese border in 1998. India has sought to install friendly governments in the Southeast Asia region. To these ends, India's external intelligence agency, R&AW, cultivated Burmese rebel groups and pro-democracy coalitions, especially the Kachin Independence Army (KIA). India allowed the KIA to carry a limited trade in jade and precious stones using Indian territory and even supplied them with weapons.

However, with increasing bonhomie between the Indian government and the Burmese junta, the KIA became the main source of training and weapons for all northeastern rebel groups in India. Thus, R&AW initiated Operation Leech, with the help of Indian Army and paramilitary forces, to assassinate the leaders of the Burmese rebels as an example to other groups.

=== Bangladesh ===
Historical relations between Myanmar and Bangladesh include centuries of trade, cultural interactions and migration between the kingdoms and empires of Bengal and the kingdoms of Burma, particularly Arakan. Most prominently this is visible in the Indic Buddhist culture of Burma that was transmitted often through Bengal resulting in the imprint of Indian (inclusive of Bengali) culture and civilisation currently found in Myanmar. The two nations also share a heritage of colonial commerce during the British Empire. The Bengali community in Myanmar is present in Yangon and the Rakhine. In Bangladesh, a large population of Burmese ancestry resides in Chittagong and southeastern hill districts, including Rakhines and Bohmong, as well as Burmese-Bengalis. After the Bangladesh Liberation War in 1971, Burma became one of the first countries to recognise the independence of Bangladesh.

However, the relationship between two countries deteriorated under Ziaur Rahman of Bangladesh. In April 1978, a large number of Rohingya refugees suddenly started arriving in Bangladesh. About 200,000 refugees arrived and took shelter during the month of June. In May 1979, Burmese president Ne Win visited Bangladesh. During his visit, the demarcation agreement between the two countries was signed on 23 May. Towards the end of Rahman's presidency, Win and Rahman visited back and forth.

The presence of 270,000 Burmese Muslim refugees (Rohingya people) in southern Bangladesh have often caused irritants in bilateral relations, which are generally cordial. A 40-year maritime boundary dispute in the Bay of Bengal was resolved by the two countries at a UN tribunal in March 2012.

Bangladesh has sought transit rights through Myanmar, to establish connectivity with China and ASEAN through projects such as the proposed Chittagong-Mandalay-Kunming highway. The governments of both countries are also in discussions on the possible export of Burmese gas to Bangladesh, as well as setting up a joint hydroelectric power plant in Rakhine State.

The political class and civil society of Bangladesh often voiced support for Myanmar's pro-democracy struggle. In 2006 a petition by 500 Bangladeshi politicians and intellectuals, including Sheikh Hasina and Kamal Hossain, expressed support for Aung San Suu Kyi and called for the release of all political prisoners in Myanmar. After winning elections in 2008, Sheikh Hasina reiterated her position on Burma's pro-democracy struggle, calling for an end to the detention of Suu Kyi and Burmese political prisoners. The Democratic Voice of Burma radio station operates bureaus in Dhaka and Chittagong.

Despite border (both territorial and nautical) tensions and the forced migration of 270,000 Rohingya Muslims from Buddhist Burma in 1978, relations with Bangladesh have generally been cordial, albeit somewhat tense at times.

Many Rohingya refugees, not recognised as a sanctioned ethnic group and allegedly suffering abuse from the Burmese authorities, remain in Bangladesh, and have been threatened with forced repatriation to Myanmar. There are about 28,000 documented refugees remaining in camps in southern Bangladesh.

At the 2008 ASEAN Regional forum summit in Singapore, Bangladesh and Myanmar have pledged to solve their maritime boundary disputes as quickly as possible especially that a UN deadline in claiming maritime territories will expire in three years time. However, in late 2008, Myanmar sent in ships into disputed waters in the Bay of Bengal for the exploration of oil and natural gas. Bangladesh responded by sending in three warships to the area and diplomatically pursued efforts to pressure the Burmese junta to withdraw their own ships. During the crisis Myanmar deployed thousands of troops on its border with Bangladesh. However, following the Bangladeshi deployment, within a week the ships withdrew and the crisis ended.

Myanmar has an embassy in Dhaka, whilst Bangladesh has an embassy in Yangon and a consular office in Sittwe. Bangladesh is also one of the first countries to begin constructing a diplomatic mission in Nay Pyi Taw.

=== Sri Lanka ===
==== History ====
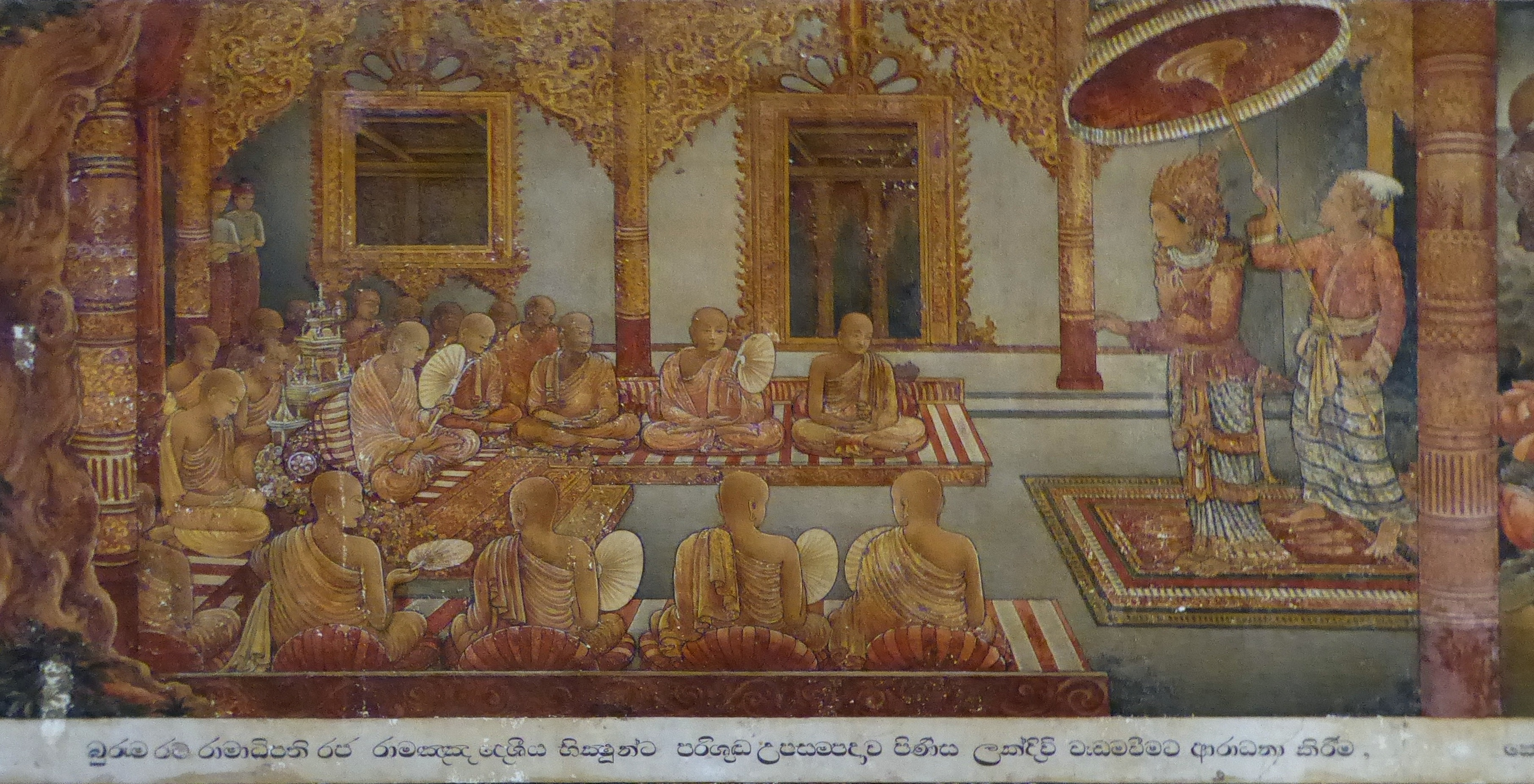
King of Burma inviting Sri Lankan Ramañña Monks to ordained

The early exchange of Theravada Buddhism between Sri Lanka and Myanmar built the two's first bilateral links and continues to be emphasised today. The generally held belief within Myanmar is that a Bhikkhu (monk) named Shin Arahan from Thaton introduced Theravada Buddhism to the Bagan Kingdom. Anawrahta invited monks from Sri Lanka, among others, after banishing Ari priests in an attempt to revitalize a more orthodox form of Buddhism. Vijayabahu I of Polonnaruwa sent a copy of the Tripitaka to Anawrahta.

In the 1150s, the Burmese king Sithu I visited the court of Parakramabahu I in Sri Lanka appointing an ambassador. According to the Sri Lankan chronicle Cūḷavaṃsa, that Sithu caught sight of a letter addressed to the King of Cambodia. He attempted to stop Sri Lanka's elephant trade with Cambodia and later captured a lesser Sinhalese princess on her way to be married to a prince of Cambodia, sparking a war between the two kingdoms in 1180.

King Dhammazedi of the Hanthawaddy kingdom sent all the monks in Lower Burma to be re-ordained on the in Sri Lanka making Sri Lankan Theravada Buddhism the dominant form of Buddhism in Myanmar. In the late 18th century, King Bodawpaya of the Konbaung Dynasty re-introduced the upasampadā ordination system to Sri Lanka, establishing the Amarapura Nikaya. The establishment of the Amarapura Nikaya was also significant as a monastic lineage was established through collective action rather than the patronage of a king.

==== Modern Relations ====
In 1949, soon after the independence of both countries, resident embassies were quickly established. The two countries continued their history of religious exchange during the Sixth Buddhist Council, hosted by Burma. The Sri Lankan delegation played a leading role in the deliberations of the council of 2500 monks.

During Myanmar's economic liberalisation of the 2010s, Myanmar and Sri Lanka furthered trade ties, signing joint trade agreements and cooperating on many development issues through BIMSTEC. Sri Lankan President Maithripala Sirisena emphasised the two countries' similarities as Theravada Buddhist countries with an agricultural economy stating that Sri Lanka was a true friend of Myanmar ready to provide assistance in international forums.

Today, the two maintain good relations with Sri Lanka presenting diplomatic credentials to Myanmar's State Administration Council (SAC_ despite international condemnation against the SAC for its war.

===== Sri Lankan officials visiting Myanmar =====
- Official visit of Hon. Sirimavo Bandaranaike, Prime Minister in January (1976)
- Visit of Hon. A.C.S. Hameed, Foreign Minister (1987)
- Visit of Hon. Lakshman Kadirgamar, Foreign Minister (1999)
- Visit of Hon. W.J.M. Loku Bandara, Minister of Buddha Sasana (2003)
- Visit of Hon. Loku Bandara, Speaker of the Parliament (2005)
- Visit of Hon Mahinda Rajapakse, Prime Minister (2004)
- Visit of Hon. Loku Bandara, Speaker (2005)
- Visit of Hon. Prime Minister (2006)
- Visit of the Hon. Minister of Foreign Affairs for First Joint Commission (2007)

===== Burmese officials visiting Sri Lanka =====
- State Visit of H.E. Gen U Ne Win, President of Myanmar (1966)
- Visit of H.E. U Win Aung, Foreign Minister of Myanmar in (1999)
- Visit of H.E. Professor Kyaw Myint, Minister of Health (2005)
- Visit of Acting Prime Minister, Lt. Gen. Thein Sein (2007)
- Visit of the Foreign Minister of Myanmar (to participate at ECOSOC) (2009)

== Other Asian countries ==
=== East Timor ===
Myanmar and Timor-Leste established diplomatic relations on 26 September 2006.

=== Pakistan ===
Pakistan and Myanmar have cordial relations with each other, with embassies in each other's capitals. Pakistan International Airlines has flown to Yangon in the past and still operates Hajj charter flights on behalf of the Burmese government.

Pakistan has a diplomatic mission in Yangon, whilst Myanmar maintains a diplomatic office in Islamabad.

=== Maldives ===
In September 2017, the Ministry of Foreign Affairs of the Maldives announced that it was ceasing all trade ties with Myanmar in response to the government's treatment of the Rohingya people in Rakhine State.

== Oceania ==
=== New Zealand ===
In February 2021, New Zealand suspended high-level bilateral relations with Myanmar following the 2021 Myanmar coup d'état and joined other Western governments in rejecting the new military-led government and has called for the restoration of civilian-led rule. In addition, aid projects were diverted away from the Tatmadaw and a travel ban was imposed on Myanmar's military leaders.

In April 2024, the New Zealand Government permitted mid-level members of the military junta to participate in the ASEAN-New Zealand Dialogue meetings in Wellington. Prime Minister Christopher Luxon justified the invitation, citing ASEAN's policy of allowing non-political Myanmar officials to participate in official ASEAN functions. This was a reversal of the previous Labour Government's policy of blocking Myanmar officials from participating in two ASEAN study tours of New Zealand.

== Timeline of diplomatic representation ==
By the end of the Union Solidarity and Development Party tenure in January 2016, Myanmar had 36 ambassadors, 3 consuls general and a permanent representative at the UN in New York. The country had established official relations with 114 independent states.

== United Nations ==
In 1961, U Thant, then Burma's Permanent Representative to the United Nations and former Secretary to the Prime Minister, was elected Secretary-General of the United Nations; he was the first non-Westerner to head any international organisation and would serve as UN Secretary-General for ten years. Among the Burmese to work at the UN when he was Secretary-General was the young Aung San Suu Kyi.

Until 2005, the United Nations General Assembly annually adopted a detailed resolution about the situation in Myanmar by consensus. But in 2006 a divided United Nations General Assembly voted through a resolution that strongly called upon the government of Myanmar to end its systematic violations of human rights.

In January 2007, Russia and China vetoed a draft resolution before the United Nations Security Council calling on the government of Myanmar to respect human rights and begin a democratic transition. South Africa also voted against the resolution, arguing that since there were no peace and security concerns raised by its neighbours, the question did not belong in the Security Council when there were other more appropriate bodies to represent it, adding, "Ironically, should the Security Council adopt [this resolution] ... the Human Rights Council would not be able to address the situation in Myanmar while the Council remains seized with the matter." The issue had been forced onto the agenda against the votes of Russia and the China by the United States (veto power applies only to resolutions) claiming that the outflow from Myanmar of refugees, drugs, HIV-AIDS, and other diseases threatened international peace and security.

The following September after the uprisings began and the human rights situation deteriorated, the Secretary-General dispatched his special envoy for the region, Ibrahim Gambari, to meet with the government. After seeing most parties involved, he returned to New York and briefed the Security Council about his visit. During this meeting, the ambassador said that the country "indeed [has experienced] a daunting challenge. However, we have been able to restore stability. The situation has now returned to normalcy. Currently, people all over the country are holding peaceful rallies within the bounds of the law to welcome the successful conclusion of the national convention, which has laid down the fundamental principles for a new constitution, and to demonstrate their aversion to recent provocative demonstrations."

On 11 October the Security Council met and issued a statement and reaffirmed its "strong and unwavering support for the Secretary-General's good offices mission", especially the work by Ibrahim Gambari (During a briefing to the Security Council in November, Gambari admitted that no timeframe had been set by the Government for any of the moves that he had been negotiating for.)

Throughout this period the World Food Program has continued to organise shipments from the Mandalay Division to the famine-struck areas to the north.

In December 2008, the United Nations General Assembly voted for a resolution condemning Myanmar's human rights record; it was supported by 80 countries, with 25 voting against and 45 abstaining.

== See also ==
- List of diplomatic missions in Myanmar
- List of diplomatic missions of Myanmar
- United Nations Security Council Resolution 45

== Bibliography ==
- Bhuyan, Suryya Kumar. (1974). Anglo-Assamese relations, 1771–1826: a history of the relations of Assam with the East India Company from 1771 to 1826, based on original English and Assamese sources. Lawyer's Book Stall.
- Bingham, June. (1966). U Thant; the Search for Peace. Gollancz.
- Byman, Daniel L., and Roger Clift. (1999) China's Arms Sales Motivations and Implications (RAND, 1999) online Archived 22 August 2021 at the Wayback Machine.
- Kipgen, Nehginpao. (2014). Democracy Movement in Myanmar: Problems and Challenges. Ruby Press & Co.. ISBN 978-93-82395-62-1
- Laqueur, Walter. (1974). A dictionary of politics. Free Press.
- Liang, Chi Shad. (1990). Burma's foreign relations: neutralism in theory and practice. Praeger. ISBN 978-0-275-93455-2
- Lintner, Bertil. (1990). The rise and fall of the Communist Party of Burma (CPB). SEAP Publications. ISBN 978-0-87727-123-9
- Nanda, Prakesh. (2003). Rediscovering Asia: evolution of India's look-east policy. Lancer Publishers & Distributors. ISBN 978-81-7062-297-0
- Narayanan, Raviprasad. "China and Myanmar: Alternating between ‘Brothers’ and ‘Cousins’." China Report 46.3 (2010): 253-265 online Archived 22 August 2021 at the Wayback Machine.
- Seekins, Donald M. (2006). Historical dictionary of Burma (Myanmar). Scarecrow Press. ISBN 978-0-8108-5476-5
- Selth, Andrew (2004). Burma's North Korean Gambit: A Challenge to Regional Security? (PDF). Canberra: Strategic and Defence Studies Centre, Australian National University. ISBN 0-7315-5441-8. Archived (PDF) from the original on 14 April 2019.
- Singh, N. K. (2003). Encyclopaedia of Bangladesh. Anmol Publications PVT. LTD. ISBN 978-81-261-1390-3
- Silverstein, Josef. (1980). Burmese politics: the dilemma of national unity. Rutgers University Press. ISBN 978-0-8135-0900-6
- South, Ashley. (2003). Mon Nationalism and Civil War in Burma: The Golden Sheldrake. Routledge. ISBN 978-0-7007-1609-8
- Swanström, Niklas. Sino-Myanmar relations: Security and beyond (Institute for Security and Development Policy, 2012) online Archived 22 August 2021 at the Wayback Machine
