= United Nations Security Council Resolution 45 =

United Nations Security Council resolution

UN Security Council Resolution 45
- Date: 10 April 1948
- Meeting no.: 279
- Code: S/717 (Document)
- Subject: Admission of new Members to the UN: Burma
- Voting summary: 10 voted for; None voted against; 1 abstained
- Result: Adopted

Security Council composition
- Permanent members: China; France; Soviet Union; United Kingdom; United States
- Non-permanent members: Argentina; Belgium; Canada; Colombia; Syria; Ukrainian SSR

United Nations Security Council Resolution 45 was adopted on 10 April 1948. The Council recommended that the General Assembly admit the Union of Burma as a member state.

Resolution 45 passed with ten votes to none. Argentina abstained.

== See also ==
- Foreign relations of Burma
- List of United Nations Security Council Resolutions 1 to 100 (1946–1953)
