= Myanmar Trade Office, The Republic of the Union of Myanmar =

Unofficial diplomatic mission

- မြန်မာကုန်သွယ်ရေးရုံး (တိုင်ပေ) 緬甸聯邦共和國駐台北貿易辦事處
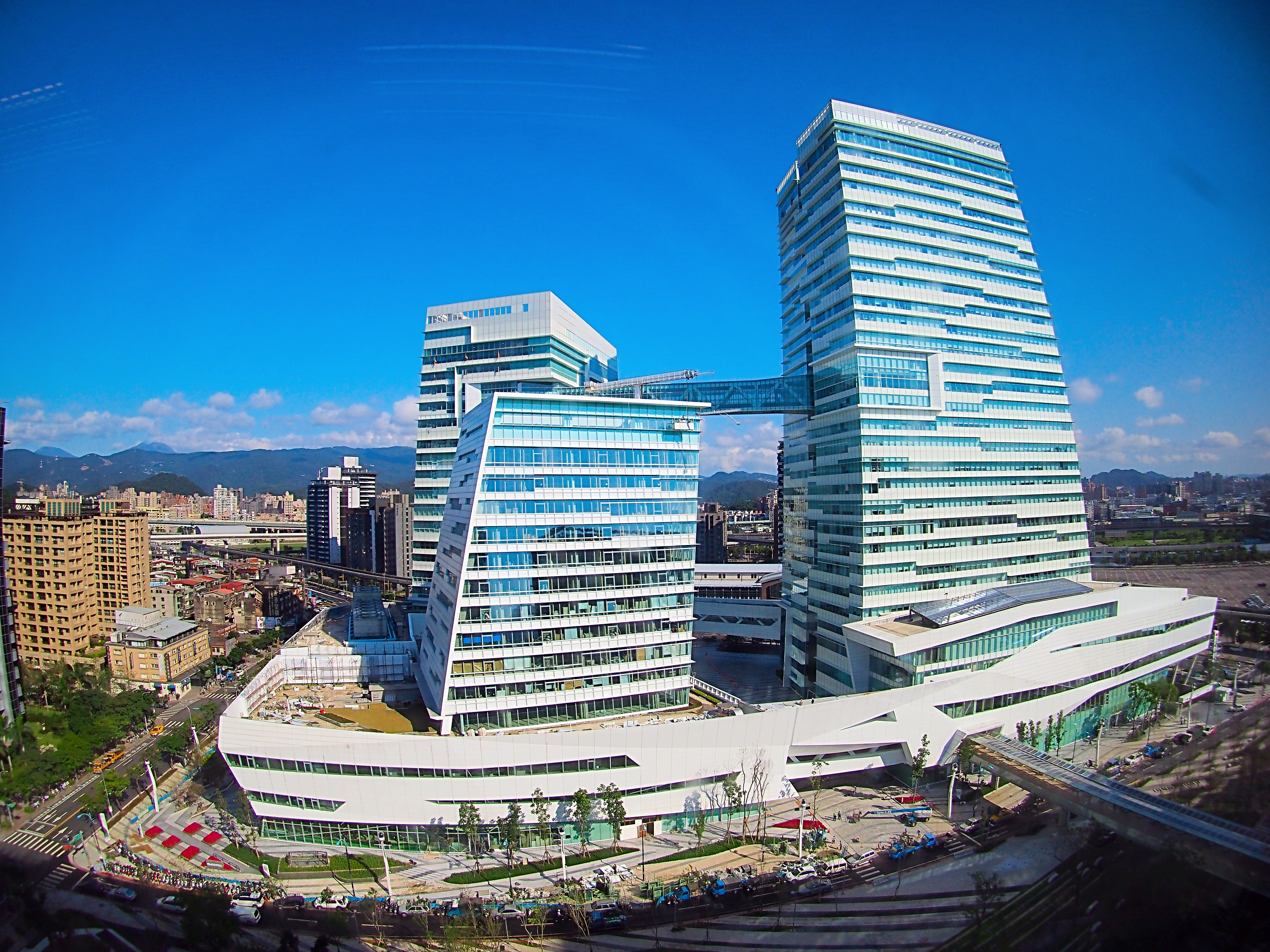
- CTBC Financial Park where the Myanmar Trade Office is located.

Agency overview
- Formed: 2015
- Jurisdiction: Republic of China (Taiwan)
- Headquarters: Nangang, Taipei
- Agency executive: Myo Thet, Representative
- Website: Myanmar Trade Office

The Myanmar Trade Office, The Republic of the Union of Myanmar (Burmese: မြန်မာကုန်သွယ်ရေးရုံး (တိုင်ပေ), Chinese: 緬甸聯邦共和國駐台北貿易辦事處; pinyin: Miǎndiàn Liánbāng Gònghéguó Zhù Táiběi Màoyì Bànshì Chù) serves as the representative office of Myanmar in Taiwan. This bureau functions as a de facto embassy while diplomatic relations are absent between Naypyitaw and Taipei. It was established in June 2015.

Its counterpart in Myanmar is the Taipei Economic and Cultural Office in Myanmar in Yangon. Taiwan External Trade Development Council established a trade mission in Yangon in November 2013.

The office was closed in 2022.

== See also ==
- List of diplomatic missions in Taiwan
- List of diplomatic missions of Myanmar
- Myanmar–Taiwan relations
