= Linn Thant =

Burmese politician, diplomat, and NUG ambassador (born 1969)

His Excellency U Linn Thant
- လင်းသန့်

Representative of the National Unity Government of Myanmar to the Czech Republic/ Head of Mission of the Republic of the Union of Myanmar to the Democratic Republic of Timor-Leste
- Incumbent
- Assumed office 24 April 2021
- President: Duwa Lashi La
- Prime Minister: Mahn Win Khaing Than
- Preceded by: Position established

Personal details
- Born: Meiktila, Central Myanmar (formerly Burma)
- Occupation: Ambassador, politician
- Profession: Politician, diplomat
- Awards: Diplomatic Service Medal with Honours (provided by Diplomacy in Ireland – European Diplomat)
- Website: https://nugmyanmar.org/

U Linn Thant (Burmese: လင်းသန့်;pronounced [lɪ̀ɴ θàɴ]; born 1969) is a Burmese politician, diplomat, and ambassador. He currently serves as the representative of the National Unity Government of Myanmar (NUG) to the Czech Republic and Head of the Myanmar Diplomatic Mission of the Republic of the Union of Myammar to the Democratic Republic of Timor-Leste. Linn Thant has been active in Myanmar’s pro-democracy movement since the 1988 uprising and is known for his involvement with the All Burma Federation of Student Unions ( ABFSU ).

== Early life and education ==
Linn Thant was born in 1969 in Meiktila, Central Burma (now Myanmar), into an Anglo-Burmese family. He was raised learning Christian culture from his British grandfather and Buddhist culture from his other grandparents. His family experienced social discrimination due to their British ancestry.

From 1984, he studied civil engineering at a local university while also teaching students of the same age at a private school. He became politically active during his teenage years, and education remained a central part of his life, both during his imprisonment and in exile.

== Political career ==
Linn Thant became politically active in the early 1980s and played a role in the 8888 Uprising as a member of the All Burma Federation of Student Unions (ABFSU). During the protests, he emerged as one of the leaders of the student movement and delivered speeches advocating democracy and human rights. He also maintained secret contacts with the opposition party, the National League for Democracy (NLD).

=== Political activism and imprisonment ===
Following the 1988 military coup, Linn Thant went into hiding and joined the ABSDF in border regions. In 1989, he was arrested by military authorities. On 25 May 1990, in a closed trial, he was sentenced to death for his political activities. He spent approximately three years on death row in Insein Prison under harsh conditions, including prolonged isolation and restraints, before his sentence was commuted to life imprisonment in 1993 under an amnesty issued by the State Law and Order Restoration Council (SLORC). In 1997, he was transferred to Thayet Prison, where conditions were comparatively better, and he was released on 9 July 2008.

During his imprisonment, Linn Thant engaged in extensive self-education, reading smuggled books, practicing meditation, and teaching fellow prisoners. He also documented prison conditions through smuggled photographs and notes to inform the international community about human rights abuses.

=== Exile and career abroad ===
After his release, he reconnected with members of the 88 Generation Student Group and helped establish educational initiatives to promote civic awareness and political understanding. Due to continued surveillance by military intelligence, he left Myanmar and resided in Thailand, working as an English teacher with the Thinking Classroom Foundation and as a reporter and commentator for The Irrawaddy news agency beginning in 2010.

In 2011, Linn Thant was granted political asylum in the Czech Republic. He later returned temporarily to Thailand before relocating permanently to the Czech Republic in 2015. There, he contributed weekly political and business columns on Myanmar and Asia for the newspaper Deník Referendum. In addition to journalism, he has taught English and mindfulness at Czech preschools and at the Center for Modern Education’s primary and secondary schools. Since 2018, he has also been engaged in the import and distribution of Burmese coffee across the Czech Republic and Europe.

== Role in the National Unity Government ==
On 24 April 2021, Linn Thant was appointed as the Representative of the National Unity Government of Myanmar to the Czech Republic. In this role, he promotes NUG’s foreign policy objectives, strengthen diplomatic relations, and raises international awareness of Myanmar’s democratic movement in Europe. On 7 July 2026, Linn Thant was appointed as Head of the Myanmar Diplomatic Mission of the Republic of the Union of Myanmar to the Democratic Republic of Timor-Leste.

== Awards and honours ==
On 25 February 2024, Linn Thant was awarded the Diplomatic Service Medal with Honours by Diplomacy in Ireland – The European Diplomat, in recognition of his efforts to promote democracy and advocate for the people of Myanmar.

23. https://english.dvb.no/myanmar-2013-2026-how-the-military-sold-the-world-a-democracy-it-never-intended-to-build/
