= United Nations World Food Programme in Myanmar =

The United Nations World Food Programme in Burma supplies the needy in Burma with food and supplies.

Headed by Bhim Udas, the WFP in Burma provides food supplies consisting of rice, pulses and, iodized salt, and oil, particularly the poor and vulnerable in the northern Rakhine and Shan states of the country and the Magwe Division. The United Nations World Food Programme in Burma is responsible for benefiting around 500,000 - 600,000 people, often working with those infected by diseases such as HIV-AIDS, malaria, and tuberculosis.

The head of the Burma Food Programme Udas has urged the Government of Burma to provide more assistance in poorer areas of the country as during difficult periods it is often three to six months until supplies can be distributed fully and by then is often too late.

During the 2007 Burmese anti-government protests the United Nations reported that food shipments out of Mandalay Division to half a million people in the northern districts were being disrupted. This problem added the shortage of funding over its three-year operation and the poverty caused by the government's eradication of opium farming. Military cooperation with the food shipments was quickly resumed.
