= Taipei Economic and Cultural Office, Yangon =

Unofficial diplomatic mission

Taipei Economic and Cultural Office in Myanmar 駐緬甸臺北經濟文化辦事處 တိုင်ပေစီးပွားရေးနှင့်ယဉ်ကျေးမှုရုံး

Agency overview
- Formed: 2014 (as the Myanmar office of the International Cooperation and Development Fund)
- Headquarters: 97/101A Dhammazedi Road, Kamayut Township, Yangon, Myanmar
- Agency executive: Louis M. Huang, Representative
- Website: Taipei Economic and Cultural Office in Myanmar

The Taipei Economic and Cultural Office in Myanmar (Chinese: 駐緬甸臺北經濟文化辦事處; pinyin: Zhù Miǎndiàn Táiběi jīngjì wénhuà bànshì chǔ) represents the interests of Taiwan in Myanmar in the absence of formal diplomatic relations, functioning as a de facto embassy.

== Background ==
The aim of the representative office is to further bilateral cooperation between Myanmar and Taiwan in the fields of economics, culture, education and research. The office also provides handling consular-related services such as passports, visas and document certifications, and providing expatriate services, overseas travel services and assistance to Taiwanese citizens in emergencies.

Before Taiwan established a representative office in Myanmar, affairs related to Myanmar were under the jurisdiction of the Taipei Economic and Cultural Office in Thailand. In 2014, the Myanmar office of the International Cooperation and Development Foundation of the Ministry of Foreign Affairs of the Republic of China was established in Yangon, the largest city in Myanmar. On 28 March 2016, it was renamed the Taipei Economic and Cultural Office in Myanmar and was directly under the jurisdiction of the Ministry of Foreign Affairs of the Republic of China.

== TECO representatives ==
Representative name	Tenure
Chun-Fu Chang	February 2017 – January 2020
Chao-Cheng Li	February 2017 – January 2020
Chung-Hsing Chou	March 2023 – September 2025
Louis M. Huang	September 2025 – incumbent

== See also ==
- List of diplomatic missions of Taiwan
- List of diplomatic missions in Myanmar
