= Japanese occupation of Burma =

Period of Burmese history from 1942 to 1945

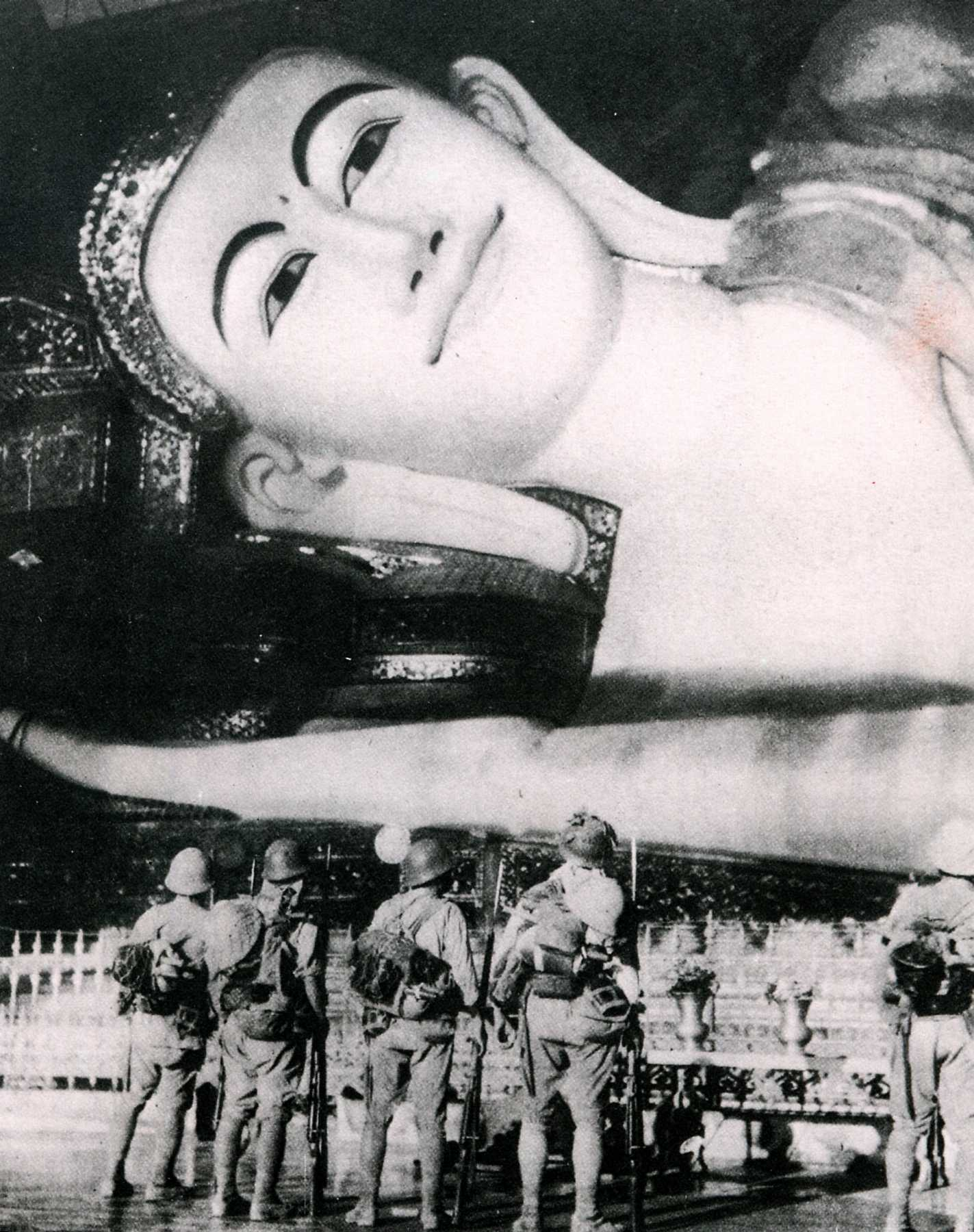
Japanese troops at Shwethalyaung Buddha, 1942

The Japanese occupation of Burma was the period between 1942 and 1945 during World War II, when Burma was occupied by the Empire of Japan. The Japanese had assisted formation of the Burma Independence Army, and trained the Thirty Comrades, who were the founders of the modern Armed Forces (Tatmadaw). The Burmese hoped to gain support of the Japanese in expelling the British, so that Burma could become independent.

In 1942, Japan invaded Burma and, on 1 August 1943, nominally declared the colony independent as the State of Burma. A pro-Japanese government led by Ba Maw was installed. However, many Burmese began to believe the Japanese had no intention of giving them real independence.

Aung San, father of future opposition leader and State Counsellor Aung San Suu Kyi, and other nationalist leaders formed the Anti-Fascist Organisation in August 1944, which asked the United Kingdom to form a coalition with the other Allies against the Japanese. By April 1945, the Allies had driven out the Japanese. Subsequently, negotiations began between the Burmese and the British for independence. Under Japanese occupation, 170,000 to 250,000 civilians died.

== Background ==
Some Burmese nationalists saw the outbreak of World War II as an opportunity to extort concessions from the British in exchange for support in the war effort. Other Burmese, such as the Thakin movement, opposed Burma's participation in the war under any circumstances. Aung San with other Thakins founded the Communist Party of Burma (CPB) in August 1939. Aung San also co-founded the People's Revolutionary Party (PRP), renamed the Socialist Party after World War II. He was also instrumental in founding the Freedom Bloc by forging an alliance of Dobama Asiayone, ABSU, politically active monks and Ba Maw's Poor Man's Party.

After Dobama Asiayone called for a national uprising, an arrest warrant was issued for many of the organisation's leaders including Aung San, who escaped to China. Aung San's intention was to make contact with the Chinese Communists but he was detected by the Japanese authorities who offered him support by forming a secret intelligence unit called the Minami Kikan, headed by Colonel Suzuki with the objective of closing the Burma Road and supporting a national uprising.

Aung San briefly returned to Burma to enlist twenty-nine young men who went to Japan with him to receive military training on Hainan, China, and they came to be known as the "Thirty Comrades". When the Japanese occupied Bangkok in December 1941, Aung San announced the formation of the Burma Independence Army (BIA) in anticipation of the Japanese invasion of Burma in 1942.

For Japan's military leadership, the conquest of Burma was a vital strategic objective upon the opening of hostilities with Britain and the United States. Occupation of Burma would interrupt a critical supply link to China. Also, the Japanese knew that rubber was one of the few militarily vital resources in which the United States was not self-sufficient. It was thought critical that the Allies be denied access to Southeast Asian rubber supplies if they were ever to accept peace terms favourable to Japan.

== Japanese occupation ==
The BIA formed a provisional government in some areas of the country in the spring of 1942, but there were differences within the Japanese leadership over the future of Burma. While Colonel Suzuki encouraged the Thirty Comrades to form a provisional government, the Japanese military leadership had never formally accepted such a plan. Eventually, the Japanese Army turned to Ba Maw to form a Government.

During the war in 1942, the BIA had grown in an uncontrolled manner, and in many districts officials and even criminals appointed themselves to the BIA. It was reorganised as the Burma Defence Army (BDA) under the Japanese but still headed by Aung San. While the BIA had been an irregular force, the BDA was recruited by selection and trained as a conventional army by Japanese instructors.

Ba Maw was afterwards declared head of state, and his cabinet included both Aung San as War Minister and the Communist leader Thakin Than Tun as Minister of Land and Agriculture as well as the Socialist leaders Thakins Nu and Mya. When the Japanese declared Burma, in theory, independent in 1943, the Burma Defence Army (BDA) was renamed the Burma National Army (BNA).

The flag of the State of Burma, used from 1943–1945.

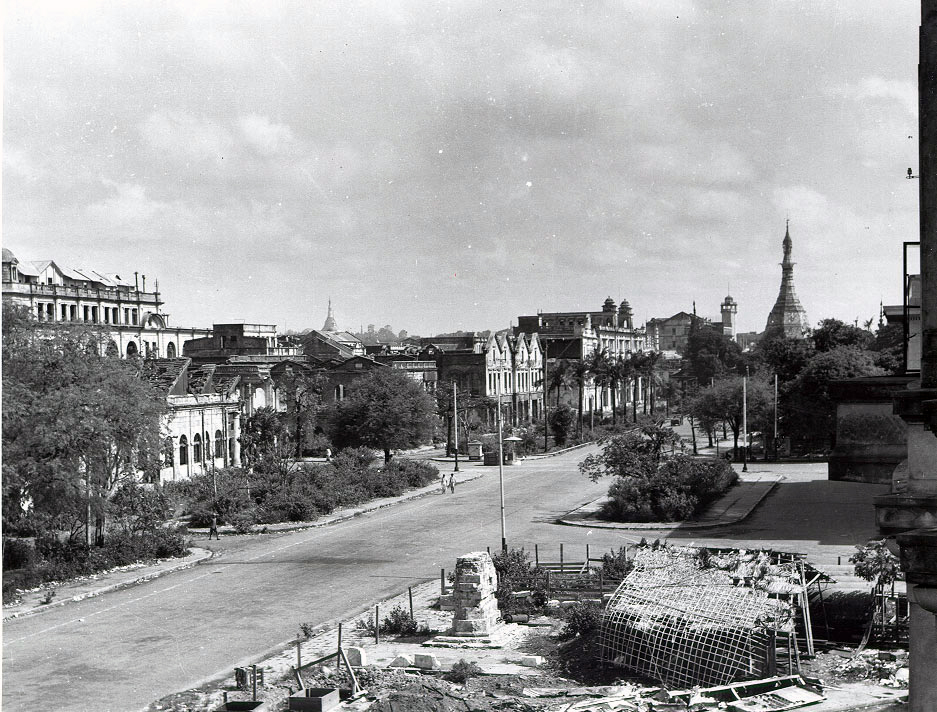
The destruction of Rangoon in the aftermath of World War II.

It soon became apparent that Japanese promises of independence were merely a sham and that Ba Maw was deceived. As the war turned against the Japanese, they declared Burma a fully sovereign state on 1 August 1943, but this was just another façade. Disillusioned, Aung San began negotiations with Communist leaders Thakin Than Tun and Thakin Soe, and Socialist leaders Ba Swe and Kyaw Nyein which led to the formation of the Anti-Fascist Organisation (AFO) in August 1944 at a secret meeting of the CPB, the PRP and the BNA in Pegu. The AFO was later renamed the Anti-Fascist People's Freedom League (AFPFL), and roundly opposed the Japanese fascism, proposing a fairer and more equal society.

Thakins Than Tun and Soe, while in Insein prison in July 1941, had co-authored the Insein Manifesto which, against the prevailing opinion in the Dobama movement, identified world fascism as the main enemy in the coming war and called for temporary co-operation with the British in a broad allied coalition which should include the Soviet Union. Soe had already gone underground to organise resistance against the Japanese occupation, and Than Tun was able to pass on Japanese intelligence to Soe, while other Communist leaders Thakins Thein Pe and Tin Shwe made contact with the exiled colonial government in Simla, India.

Japanese soldiers from the 3rd Battalion, the 215th Regiment and the OC Moulmein Kempeitai of the Imperial Japanese Army entered the village of Kalagong on 7 July 1945 and rounded up all the inhabitants for questioning. These soldiers were then ordered by Major General Seiei Yamamoto, chief of staff of the 33rd Army, to kill an estimated 600 Burmese villagers.

== End of the occupation ==
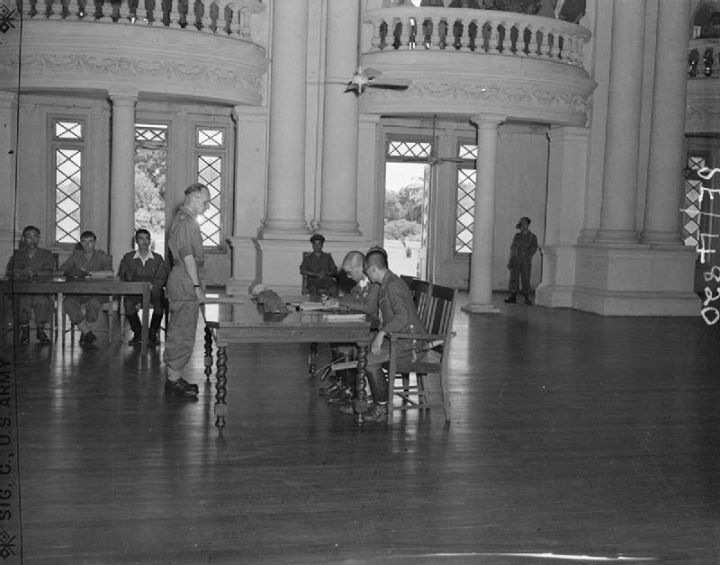
General Ichida Jiro formally surrenders to Brigadier E.P.E. Armstrong at Government House, Rangoon.

There were informal contacts between the AFO and the Allies in 1944 and 1945 through the British Force 136. On 27 March 1945, the Burma National Army rose up in a country-wide rebellion against the Japanese. 27 March had been celebrated as 'Resistance Day' until the military renamed it 'Tatmadaw (Armed Forces) Day'. Aung San and others subsequently began negotiations with Lord Mountbatten and officially joined the Allies as the Patriotic Burmese Forces (PBF). At the first meeting, the AFO represented itself to the British as the provisional government of Burma with Thakin Soe as Chairman and Aung San as a member of its ruling committee.

The Japanese were routed from most of Burma by May 1945. Negotiations then began with the British over the disarming of the AFO and the participation of its troops in a post-war Burma Army. Some veterans had been formed into a paramilitary force under Aung San, called the Pyithu yèbaw tat or People's Volunteer Organisation (PVO), and were openly drilling in uniform. The absorption of the PBF was concluded successfully at the Kandy conference in Ceylon in September 1945.

== See also ==
- Battle of Meiktila and Mandalay
- Battle of the Admin Box
- Bengal famine of 1943
- Burma campaign
- China Burma India Theater of World War II
- Chindits
- Japanese conquest of Burma
- Japanese invasion money (Burma)
- Merrill's Marauders
- Operation Capital
- Operation Dracula
- William Slim, 1st Viscount Slim
- Women's Auxiliary Service (Burma)
