= Burma–Yugoslavia relations =

- Burma: Yugoslavia

Burma–Yugoslavia relations were historical foreign relations between Burma (modern day Myanmar) and now split-up Socialist Federal Republic of Yugoslavia. Both countries were among founding members of the Non-Aligned Movement and U Kyaw Nyein personally attended the movement's first conference in Belgrade. During its years of rise and active participation in the world politics Yugoslavia represented a role model to Burma with many high-level Burmese officials (including U Kyaw Nyein) stating as their future political goal “to transform Burma into the Yugoslavia in Asia.” Yugoslavia and Burma found common ground in the fields of ideology and foreign policy and the League of Communists of Yugoslavia led by Vladimir Dedijer attended the 1953 Asian Socialist Conference in Rangoon. Inclusion of Yugoslavia in the Conference was particularly promoted by Burma while Yugoslavia perceived its independent participation (as the only independent European delegation) as a recognition and honor which led to the opening of Yugoslav Embassy in Rangoon during the Conference.

The 1947 Constitution of Burma closely followed the model of the 1946 Yugoslav Constitution in an effort to clearly distinguish the foundational legal document from the earlier colonial era common law. In 1953 Yugoslavia supported Burma at the United Nations following its accusation made against the nationalist Republic of China (Taiwan) for aggression.

== See also ==
- Yugoslavia and the Non-Aligned Movement
- Anti-Fascist People's Freedom League
- Anti-Fascist Council for the National Liberation of Yugoslavia
- Death and state funeral of Josip Broz Tito
- Myanmar-Serbia relations
- Embassy of Myanmar, Belgrade
