= Myanmar–Serbia relations =

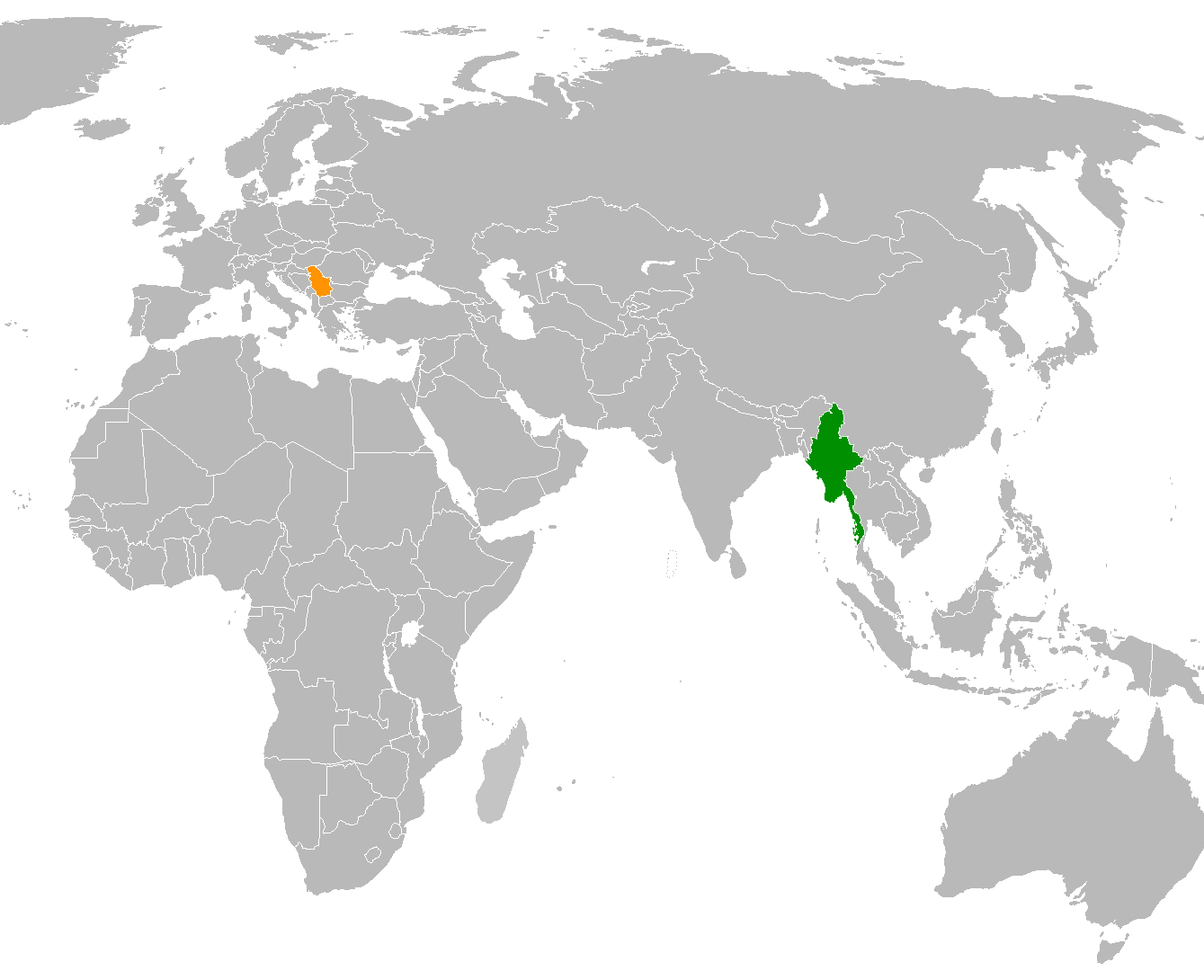
- Myanmar: Serbia

Myanmar and Serbia maintain diplomatic relations established between Myanmar and SFR Yugoslavia in 1950. From 1950 to 2006, Myanmar maintained relations with the Socialist Federal Republic of Yugoslavia (SFRY) and the Federal Republic of Yugoslavia (FRY) (later Serbia and Montenegro), of which Serbia is considered shared (SFRY) or sole (FRY) legal successor.

== History ==
Relations between Yugoslavia and Burma officially began in 1950, and the two countries had an unusually close relationship during the Cold War. In 1947, Kyaw Nyein and another high ranking Burmese politician visited Yugoslavia, and the 1946 Yugoslav Constitution was the basis for the 1947 Burmese Constitution. The Chinese Embassy in Rangoon described the relations between Yugoslavia and Burma in a confidential report in 1958 as, "relations between Burma and Yugoslavia...fall into special category of relations...while the political cooperation between these two countries cannot be ignored."

The Burmese government viewed Yugoslavia as a prime example of the socialist path they wanted Burma to take, and several high ranking Burmese politicians, including Kyaw Nyein, expressed their desires to transform Burma into the "Yugoslavia of Asia." Both Burma and Yugoslavia shared many commonalities, among them the diverse ethnic groups and religions, and the endeavor of a policy of neutrality during the Cold War.

In 1952, shortly before the two nations appointed ambassadors, the Burmese government reached out to the Yugoslav embassy in Pakistan to ask for an arms deal, and the deal was later solidified during a state visit to Belgrade. Due to the rather fast and uninhibited nature of the arms deliveries, the Burmese military, and General Ne Win in particular, who previously sought support from the United States, was impressed. In the following decades, Yugoslavia became one of, if not the primary arms supplier of Burma.

H.E. U Zaw Tun, the 18th ambassador of Myanmar to Serbia, donated a bronze statue of Buddha to the Middle Way Therawada Buddhist Association in Belgrade in 2013, and the embassy there hosts a variety of cultural events.

Burmese Senior General Min Aung Hlaing visited the Belgrade embassy and Kalemegdan Fortress in 2015.

== Resident diplomatic missions ==
- Myanmar has an embassy in Belgrade.
- Serbia has an embassy in Yangon.

== See also ==
- Foreign relations of Myanmar
- Foreign relations of Serbia
- Burma–Yugoslavia relations
- Yugoslavia and the Non-Aligned Movement
