= T. B. Simatupang =

20th-century Indonesian military officer

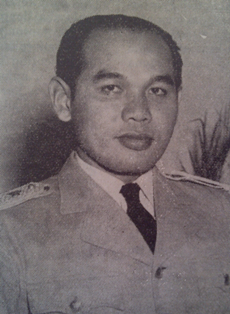
- Portrait of Simatupang, 1955

2nd Chief of Staff of the War Forces of the Republic of Indonesia
- In office 29 January 1950 – 4 November 1953
- President: Sukarno
- Preceded by: Lt. Gen. Sudirman
- Succeeded by: General Abdul Haris Nasution (1955)

Personal details
- Born: Tahi Bonar Simatupang; 28 January 1920 Sidikalang, Dairi, Tapanoeli, Dutch East Indies
- Died: 1 January 1990 (aged 69) Jakarta, Indonesia
- Resting place: Kalibata Heroes' Cemetery
- Spouse: Sumarti Budiardjo
- Children: 4 children
- Relatives: Sahala Hamonangan Simatupang (brother)

Military service
- Allegiance: Dutch East Indies; Indonesia
- Branch/service: Dutch East Indies Army; Indonesian Army
- Years of service: 1942–1959
- Rank: Lieutenant general
- Unit: Engineers
- Commands: Indonesian Armed Forces
- Battles/wars: Indonesian National Revolution; Operation Kraai; 17 October affair; Darul Islam rebellion
- Awards: National Hero of Indonesia (posthumous, 2013)
- Other works: Ministry of Defense; Army Staff College
- Service no.: 104790

Tahi Bonar Simatupang (28 January 1920 – 1 January 1990) was a soldier who served in the Indonesian National Revolution and went on to become chief of staff of the Indonesian Armed Forces.

== Early life ==
Simatupang was born in Dairi, North Sumatra, then part of the Dutch East Indies to a Batak Protestant family. Simatupang attended a Dutch colonial school and then moved to Jakarta in 1937 for further study. Among his friends in the Batak youth in Batavia during that time were Oloan Hutapea and Josef Simanjutak, future high-ranking Indonesian Communist Party (PKI) members Lintong Mulia Sitorus, future Indonesian Socialist Party secretary general. In 1942, he gained entry to the Dutch Military Academy, but his studies were interrupted by the Japanese invasion. During the Japanese occupation, Simatupang rented a house with Sitorus and Hutapea in the Tanah Tinggi district of Batavia. He notes that other Batak youth called them De Drie Musketiers, that they were often together attending lectures by people such as Sutan Sjahrir and collecting books about independence movements in other countries.

== Military career ==
During the Indonesian National Revolution, Simatupang, now a colonel, joined the Siliwangi Division in Central Java, and by January 1950, following the death of General Sudirman, he was acting chief of staff of the Indonesian Armed Forces (Angkatan Perang). Like Army Chief of Staff General Nasution, he was an "administrator", committed to the reduction in size of the armed forces after independence had been won to bring about a professional military. He opposed efforts by a disgruntled rival, Colonel Bambang Supemo, to replace Nasution, but was himself criticized for apparent political bias after articles he wrote in 1952 were perceived as favoring the Socialist Party of Indonesia (PSI). After the incident on 17 October 1952, in which the army brought demonstrators and troops to the Merdeka Palace to persuade President Sukarno to dissolve parliament, Simatupang's days were numbered, and on 4 November 1953, his post as chief of staff was abolished, effectively dismissing him. He then took a position as an adviser to the Ministry of Defense and then became a lecturer at the Army Staff College and the Military Legal Academy before resigning from the military altogether in 1959.

== Post-military life ==
After his resignation, Simatupang devoted his life to religious duties and writing. He died in Jakarta on the first day of 1990. In November 2013, Simatupang, together with Rajiman Wediodiningrat and Lambertus Nicodemus Palar, was declared a National Hero of Indonesia.

== Legacy ==
T.B. Simatupang is now used as a street name in Cilandak, South Jakarta. His face is also depicted in 2016 series 500 rupiah coins.

== Selected works ==
- Peloper delam perang peloper dalem damel (1954)
- Soal-soal politik militer di Indonesia (1956)
- Pemerintah, masjarakat, Angkatan Perang. Pidatopidato dan karangan-karangan 1955-1958 (1960)
- Laporan dari Banaran : kisah pengalaman seorang pradjurit selama perang (1961) Released in English in 1972 as Report from Banaran: Experiences during the people's war, translated by Benedict Anderson, E. Graves, John Smail. Released in Dutch language in 1985 as Het laatste jaar van de Indonesische vrijheidsstrijd, 1948-1949 : een authentiek verslag door de voormalig chef-staf van de Indonesische strijdkrachten
- Capita selecta masalah hankam [oleh] T.B. Simatupang
- Pembangunan : soal hidup atau mati bagi negara Pantjasila (1968)
- Pengantar ilmu perang di Indonesia (1968)
- Komunikasi, konfrontasi, modernisasi dan negara Pancasila yang membangun (1972)
- Kejakinan dan perdjuangan (1972)
- Dari Edinburgh ke Jakarta (1974)
- Ketahanan nasional dalam situasi baru di Asia Tenggara (1976)
- Het laatste jaar van de Indonesische vrijheidsstrijd, 1948-1949 : een authentiek verslag door de voormalig chef-staf van de Indonesische strijdkrachten (1985)
- Harapan, keprihatinan dan tekad; Angkatan 45 merampungkan tugas sejarahnya. (1986)
- Kehadiran Kristen dalam perang, revolusi, dan pembangunan : berjuang mengamalkan Pancasila dalam terang iman (1986)
- Dari revolusi ke pembangunan (1987)
- Indonesia : leadership and national security perceptions (1987)
- Saya adalah orang yang berhutang (1990)
- Membuktikan ketidakbenaran suatu mitos : menelusuri makna seorang prajurit generasi pembebas bagi masa depan masyarakat, bangsa dan negara (1991) Released in English in 1996 as The fallacy of a myth
- Iman Kristen dan Pancasila (1995)

== Notes ==
Military offices
Preceded by Sudirman as Commander of the War Forces	Chief of Staff of the Indonesian War Forces; 1950–1953	Succeeded by Abdul Haris Nasution as Chairman of the Joint Chiefs of Staff
