= Embassy of Myanmar, Belgrade =

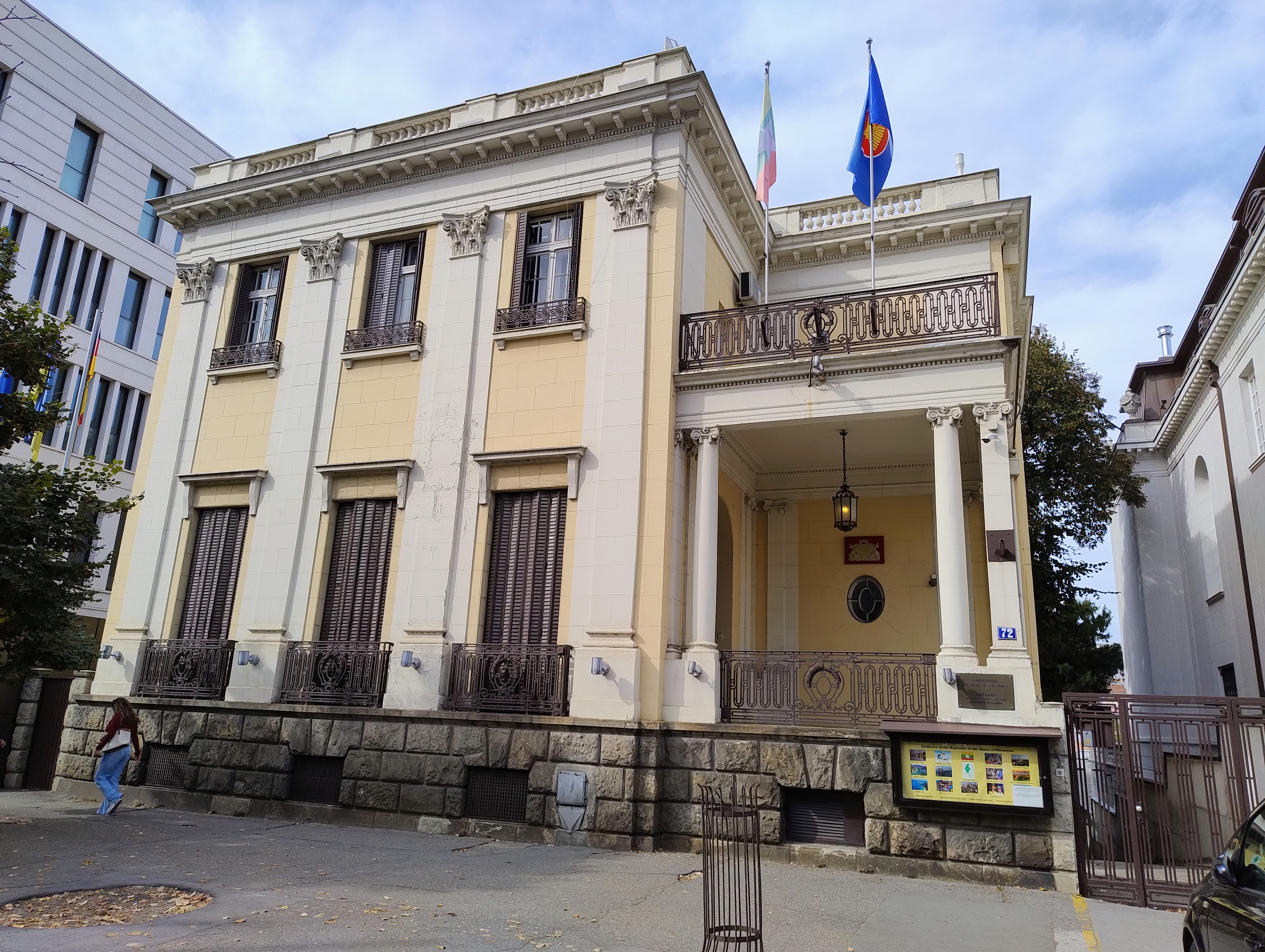
- Location: Belgrade, Serbia
- Address: Kneza Miloša Street 72
- Coordinates: 44°48′07″N 20°27′18″E
- Ambassador: U Aung Min Oo

The Embassy of Myanmar in Belgrade (Burmese: ဘယ်လ်ဂရိတ်မြို့ရှိ မြန်မာသံရုံး, Serbian: Амбасада Мјанмара у Београду, romanized: Ambasada Mjanmara u Beogradu) is the diplomatic mission of Myanmar in the Serbia. Myanmar opened its embassy in Belgrade in 1955 at its present location at Kneza Miloša Street 72.

== History ==
Burma and the Socialist Federal Republic of Yugoslavia established formal diplomatic relations in 1950, quickly developing close cooperation grounded in shared ideological and foreign-policy orientations. Burmese political elites were notably influenced by the Yugoslav model of independent socialism following the Tito–Stalin split, while both states sought to assert autonomy within the Cold War order. These affinities were clearly reflected in Yugoslavia’s participation in the 1953 Asian Socialist Conference in Rangoon. Belgrade interpreted this participation as a gesture of recognition, and it coincided with the opening of the Yugoslav embassy in Rangoon.

== See also ==
- Burma–Yugoslavia relations
