= Lintong Mulia Sitorus =

Indonesian writer and politician

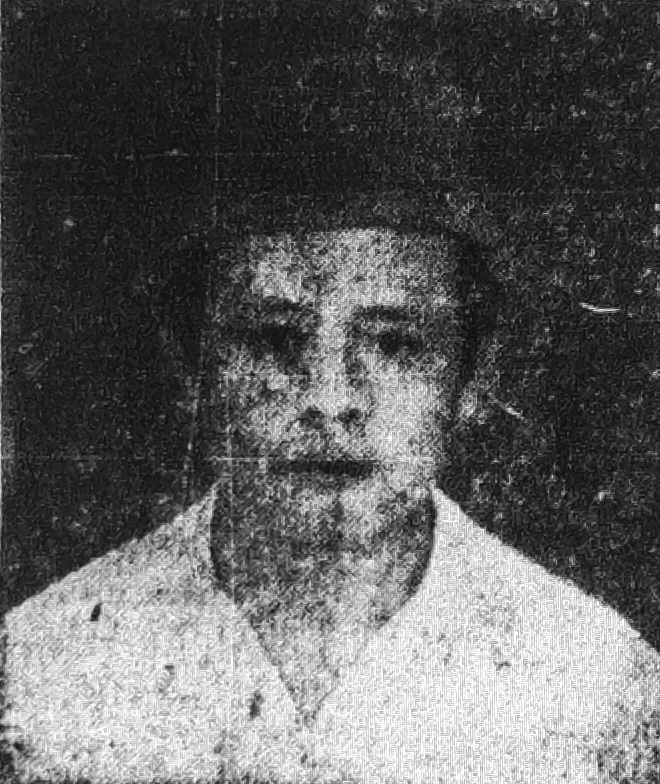

Personal details
- Born: 1920
- Died: Unknown
- Party: Socialist Party of Indonesia
- Occupation: Politician

Lintong Mulia Sitorus (born 1920), in pre-1948 spelling Lintong Moelia Sitoroes, was an Indonesian intellectual, writer, translator, lawyer, and Socialist Party of Indonesia politician. He was a key follower of the independent-minded Indonesian nationalist Sutan Sjahrir in the 1940s and 1950s.

== Biography ==
=== Early life ===
Sitorus was of Batak background and was born in Tapanuli or possibly in Pematangsiantar in Sumatra in 1920. He left Sumatra to enroll in Dutch-language secondary schooling in Java, first in Bandung and then in the Yogyakarta Algemene Middelbare School. He later admitted that during that time he had a very pro-Dutch orientation. As a youth in the 1930s, he was a competitive chess player.

Towards the end of Dutch rule, as a law student at the Rechthoogeschool in Batavia, he was greatly influenced by left-wing nationalist figures such as Amir Sjarifuddin Harahap, Tan Malaka, Sutan Sjahrir, and Amir Hamzah. He was also in a circle of young Batak intellectuals which included Oloan Hutapea, T. B. Simatupang, and Josef Simanjuntak. He was a member of the radical student association Perhimpunan Pelajar-Pelajar Indonesia (Association of Indonesian students, PPPI), as was Simatupang, as well as the apolitical Unitas Studiosorum Indonesiensis (USI).

=== Japanese occupation and Indonesian National Revolution ===
During the Japanese occupation of the Dutch East Indies, having recently graduated from law school, Sitorus got a low-level position in the Ministry of Justice along with his former schoolmates Ali Boediardjo and Andi Zainal Abidin. During this time he also became even closer to Sutan Sjahrir, who had been released from an internment camp by the Dutch in 1942. Sitorus rented a house with Simatupang and Hutapea in the Tanah Tinggi district of Batavia. The three read widely during that period and regularly attended Sjahrir lectures; other Batak youth nicknamed them De Drie Musketiers (the three musketeers). During the occupation Sitorus was also editor of an Indonesian-language literary magazine called Pudjangga Baru.

As the Japanese occupation ended and Java was occupied by Allied Forces, Sitorus wrote for Sjahrir's new Dutch-language literary magazine Het Inzicht (The Insight) along with such figures as Chairil Anwar, Noegroho and Soedjatmoko. He also became an organizing secretary for Amir Sjarifuddin Harahap's Socialist Party (Partai Sosialis) and was involved in the founding of the Indonesian Peasants' League (Indonesian: Barisan Tani Indonesia).

=== Independent Indonesia ===
After Indonesia gained its independence in 1948, Sitorus became a key member of Sjahrir's Socialist Party of Indonesia (Indonesian: Partai Sosialis Indonesia), a small political party that nonetheless had a wide influence in the country. Sjahrir's PSI split in 1948 from Sjarifuddin's Socialist Party after its leader had shown an increasing loyalty to the USSR and Communist-style class struggle, whereas Sjahrir hoped for a more nationalistic, Indonesia-focused platform. However, until 1949 the party was not fully organized or active as Sjahrir had been detained by the Dutch. In 1950 Sjahrir appointed Sitorus to the party's executive and tasked him with helping to prepare the party's constitution.

His most active period of writing and publishing was during the early 1950s. Starting in the late 1940s he wrote for and occasionally edited the party's newspaper, Sikap, a role he held for the following decade. He also worked hard at writing articles, books, and translating. He continued to read widely and often argued for learning lessons from history to be realistic about the possibilities of social change. At that time comparatively little advanced reading material was available in Indonesian; the publishing house Jajasan Pembangunan funded a large number of translations in the early 1950s including some by Sitorus; he translated several political science and socialist books from Dutch and English into Indonesian. He also wrote history books about the genesis of the Indonesian national movement in the pre-Independence years.

At the Socialist Party's first conference in 1952, Sitorus was elected to its executive council. Later that year he became the party's General Secretary. He saw himself as more of an organizer than an academic theorist and believed in a populist approach to the party. At the party's second congress in 1955, he was reelected to the executive. Before and especially after the 1955 election he was in favour of the PSI working more closely with President Sukarno; Sjahrir preferred that the party keep its distance. The party sent delegates to the second Asian Socialist Conference in Bombay in 1956; Sitorus and Sjahrir attended, as did fellow PSI members Soebadio Sastroatomo and Soedjatmoko. As time went on, the party did not grow closer to Sukarno and was eventually banned by him in 1960 during the Guided Democracy period.

== Selected works ==
=== Original works ===
- Sedjarah pergerakan kebangsaan Indonesia (History of the Indonesian national movement, 1951)
- Masalah organisasi (Organizational problems, 1954)
- Sejarah pergerakan dan kemerdekaan Indonesia (History of Indonesian movement and independence)

=== Translations ===
- Sedjarah kemerdekaan berfikir (1951, translation of English-language book by J. B. Bury)
- Pengantar ilmu politik (1952, translation of Dutch-language book by J. Barents)
- Masalah-masalah demokrasi: Suatu studi sosiologis dan psychologis (1952, translation of Dutch-language book by Willem Adriaan Bonger)
- Ilmu politika: suatu perkenalan lapangan (1953, translation of Dutch-language book De wetenschap der politiek: een terreinverkenning by J. Barents)
- Pikiran sardjana2 besar ahli ekonomi (1966, translation of English-language book by George Henry Soule Jr.)
