= Socialist Party of Indonesia =

Political party in Indonesia (1948–1960)

Socialist Party of Indonesia Partai Sosialis Indonesia
- Abbreviation: PSI
- Chairman: Sutan Sjahrir
- Founded: 13 February 1948
- Banned: 17 August 1960
- Split from: Socialist Party
- Headquarters: 6 Djalan Tjisedane, Jakarta
- Youth wing: Gerakan Pemuda Sosialis
- Women's wing: Gerakan Wanita Sosialis
- Ideology: Socialism
- Political position: Left-wing
- International affiliation: Asian Socialist Conference

The Socialist Party of Indonesia (Indonesian: Partai Sosialis Indonesia, PSI) was a socialist political party in Indonesia which existed from 1948 until 1960, when it was banned by President Sukarno.

== Origins ==
In December 1945, Amir Sjarifoeddin's Socialist Party of Indonesia (Parsi) and Sutan Sjahrir's Socialist People's Party (Parsas), both of which had only recently been established, merged to form the Socialist Party. Sjahrir became leader of the combined party. It was popular among young intellectuals and students, as well as members of the underground movements led by the two men during the Japanese occupation of the Dutch East Indies. At the end of 1945, the Socialist Party gained five of the 25 seats on the working committee of the Central Indonesian National Committee, the de facto legislature. Both Sjahrir and Amir served terms as prime minister, while other Socialist Party members held senior cabinet posts.

From 1947, divisions appeared between Sjahrir and Amir, as Amir and his communist allies gained more and more influence over the party. In June 1947, Amir ousted Sjahrir. The second party called the Socialist Party of Indonesia was founded on 12 February 1948 by Sjahrir after his departure from the Socialist Party. Joining him in the new party were Lintong Mulia Sitorus and other followers who agreed with his position on nationalism and not having a strongly pro-Soviet line. The party also launched a newspaper called Sikap, which Sitorus edited.

== The PSI in the Liberal Democracy Era ==
Following the dissolution of the United States of Indonesia and the reestablishment of the unitary Republic of Indonesia in 1950, the PSI was awarded 17 of the 232 seats in the new legislature, the People's Representative Council (DPR), a total in proportion to the estimated strength of the party.

The PSI held its first party congress in 1952.

In the 1955 legislative election, the PSI won only 2% of the vote, resulting in five seats in the legislature. This was a far smaller share of the vote than had been expected.

The second party congress was held in June 1955.

== Decline and fall ==
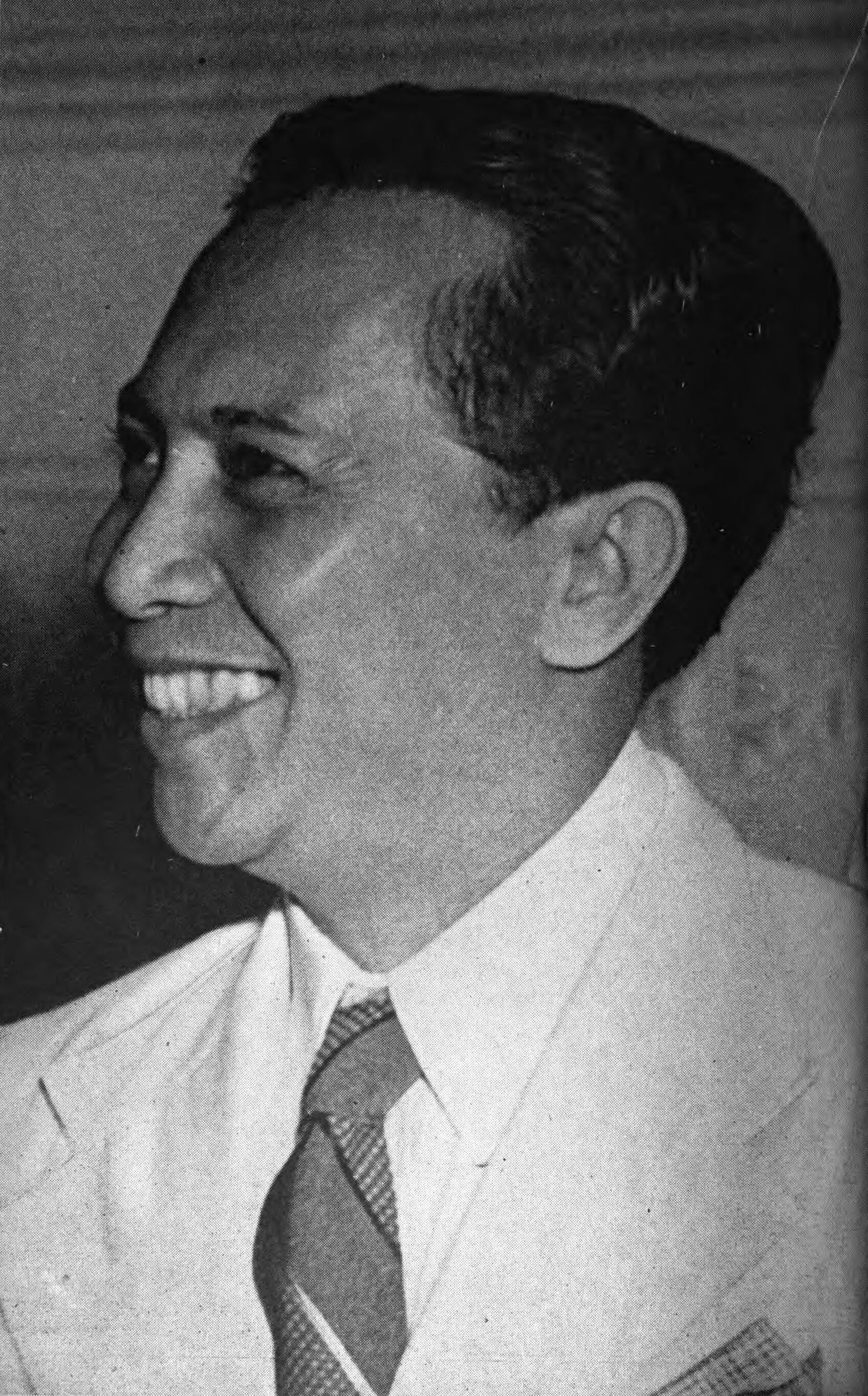
Former Prime Minister Sutan Sjahrir was the founder and chairman of the PSI throughout its existence

After the 1955 elections, a clear political division between Java and the outer islands opened up. This was followed by a military crisis brought about by army chief-of-staff General Nasution's plan to implement widespread transfers of officers, many of whom had built up private business interests in the regions. On 20 July 1956, the most prominent non-Javanese politician, Vice-president Hatta, resigned with effect from 1 December. Tired of the political infighting, on 28 October, President Sukarno called for an end to political parties. This would lead to his 1957 conception of “guided democracy”, which the PSI opposed.

In December 1956, several army commanders in Sumatra announced they had taken over civil government. This crisis spread and in March 1957, the military commander of East Indonesia imposed martial law over his command area. In March 1957 the cabinet resigned and Sukarno proclaimed martial law nationwide. In May 1957, PSI economist Professor Sumitro Djojohadikusumo left Jakarta for Sumatra, followed by other political figures. In January 1958, the PSI demanded a new cabinet, and the following month dissidents in Padang, West Sumatra issued an ultimatum demanding the dissolution of the cabinet within five days. Despite efforts by the PSI in Jakarta to forestall a rebellion, on 15 February a rebel government was proclaimed in Bukitinggi called the Revolutionary Government of the Republic of Indonesia (PRRI). It was headed by Sjafruddin Prawiranegara as prime minister and included Burhanuddin Harahap from the Masyumi Party and Sumitro Djojohadikusumo. Hatta and PSI leaders in Jakarta called for a negotiated settlement, but the government decided on a military solution, which defeated the rebellion by mid-1958.

Sukarno implemented his plan for guided democracy by issuing a decree restoring the 1945 Constitution. The PSI was not represented in either the new cabinet, the Supreme Advisory Council nor the National Planning Council established under the new system. Finally, in August 1960, President Sukarno formally banned the PSI and the Masyumi Party for their opposition to Guided Democracy and their alleged support of the PRRI rebellion.

== Party philosophy ==
The party's philosophy was based on Fabianism with elements of Marxist social analysis. There was a distinct Indonesian character to the party's brand of socialism. It stressed the need for modernization, economic development and rational planning and organization, while opposing extreme nationalism and anti-foreign sentiment. It accepted the need for foreign capital, but party leaders criticized what they saw as the Hatta cabinet's overcautious foreign policy and the strong influence of the United States over it. They strongly opposed the party siding with either the United States or the Soviet Union.

Rather than building support among the masses, the party aimed to develop a well-trained core of members. It had considerable influence among high-level bureaucrats and the leadership of the army. Sultan Hamengkubuwana IX and Nasution did not belong to the PSI, but they had strong informal links with it.

== See also ==
- Gerakan Tani Indonesia
