= Sikap =

Sikap (also known as Mimbar-politik sikap) was an Indonesian newspaper published in Jakarta in the 1950s during the Sukarno era.

Sikap was published by the Education and Propaganda Section of the Socialist Party of Indonesia. L. M. Sitorus was the editor of the newspaper.

Due to the nature of publications from the 1950s, frequency varies in library catalogues and only short incomplete runs have been microfilmed. Also due to the anti-socialist tendencies of the Suharto era, few if any copies remained in Indonesia. The microfiche project by Interdocumentation was able to collect more documents.

== See also ==
- Pedoman
