= Gerakan Tani Indonesia =

Former political organization in Indonesia

Gerakan Tani Indonesia ('Indonesian Peasants Movement') was a peasants organization in Indonesia. It was politically linked to the Socialist Party of Indonesia (PSI). GTI was founded in September 1954. The socialists had previously worked alongside communists in the Barisan Tani Indonesia, but had split away from BTI in August 1954 in protest of communist dominance over the organization. At the time of its foundation, GTI claimed a membership of 1.5 million. It initially had 24 branches, but expanded to have 100 branches nationwide two years later.

GTI published the newspaper Masrakat Tani from Bogor. The newspaper had a circulation of around 15,000.
