= Kempeitai =

Military police of the Imperial Japanese Army

- 憲兵隊
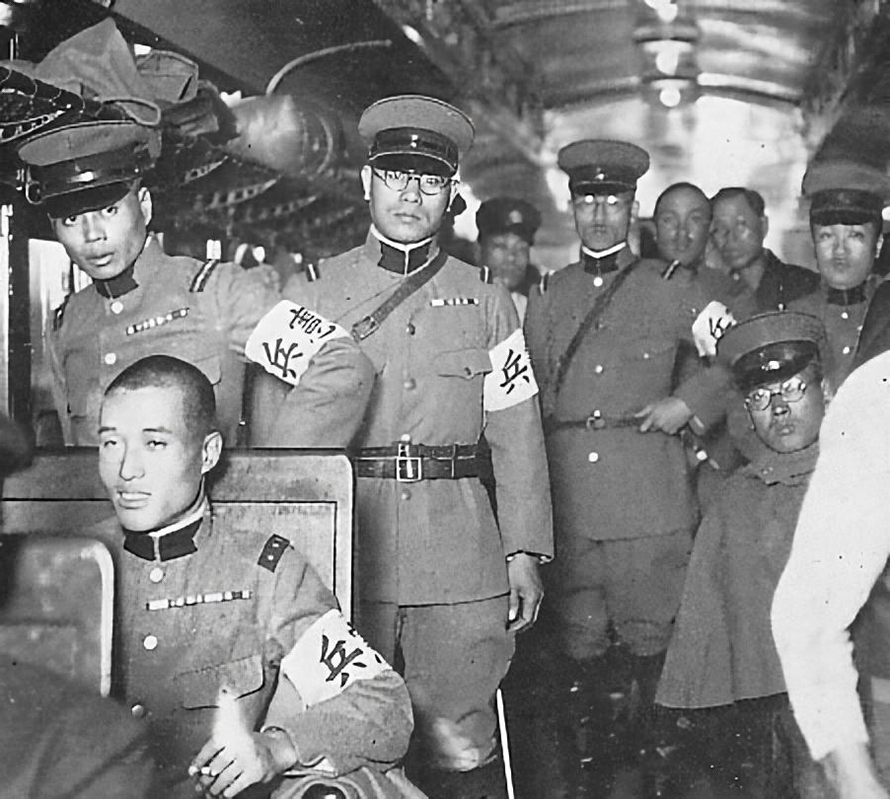
- Kenpei officers aboard a train in 1935
- Active: 1881–1945
- Country: Empire of Japan
- Branch: Imperial Japanese Army
- Type: Gendarmerie; Military police Secret police
- Size: about 35,000 (c. 1945)
- Part of: Home Ministry (Japanese home islands); Army Ministry (overseas territories)

The Kempeitai (Japanese: 憲兵隊, Hepburn: Kenpeitai; lit. 'Corps of Law Soldiers') was the military police of the Imperial Japanese Army (IJA). The organization also shared civilian secret police and gendarmerie responsibilities. At its peak at the end of World War II, the Kempeitai had about 35,000 personnel, or kempei (憲兵).

Founded in 1881 during the Meiji era, the Kempeitai was based on France's National Gendarmerie. The broad duties of the Kempeitai included maintaining military discipline, enforcing conscription laws, protecting vital military zones, and investigating crimes among soldiers. Institutionally part of the Army, the Kempeitai also discharged limited military police functions for the Imperial Japanese Navy (IJN).

As Japanese militarism expanded, so did the Kempeitai's ranks and duties.

During World War II, the organization ran Japan's prisoner-of-war camps and civilian internment camps, and were known for their mistreatment of detainees. They also provided security at important government and military locations at risk of being sabotaged within the Empire of Japan and its occupied territories.

It also procured comfort women as well as human test subjects for Unit 731.

The Kempeitai specialized in clandestine and covert operation, counterinsurgency, and counterintelligence. They conducted raids to capture high-value targets. They created an Imperial Japanese Army security network, interrogating suspects who might be Allied soldiers and spies or members of a resistance movement.

In occupied areas, it issued travel permits, recruited labor, and requisitioned food and supplies.

The Kempeitai also acted as a political police force in the military and occupied territories. It spread propaganda and suppressed dissent and anti-Japanese sentiment. It was notorious for its brutality, carrying out torture, summary executions, and violent reprisals and massacres against civilians.

The Kempeitai was disbanded after the war, and many of its leaders were tried and convicted of war crimes.

== History ==
The Kempeitai was established on 4 January 1881, during the Meiji era, by order of the Great Council of State as part of a broader modernization and Westernization of the Japanese military. Initially, the organization was an elite corps of 349 men, and was tasked with the narrow role of enforcing the new army conscription legislation. Under laws passed in 1898 and 1928, the organization functioned in a General Affairs Section and a Service Section; the former took up the Kempeitai's policy, personnel, discipline, and records functions, as well as political policing within the IJA and IJN parallel to the civilian Special Higher Police (Tokkō), while the latter was responsible for supply, organization, and training; public security; and counterintelligence. The Navy, seeking to limit Army influence, also maintained its own military police corps, known as the Tokkeitai.

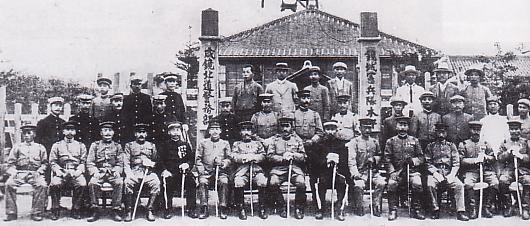
Kempei keisatsu gendarmes in Japanese-controlled Korea

After the Russo-Japanese War (1904–1905), the Empire of Japan effectively controlled the Korean Peninsula, which was formally annexed into the empire as Chōsen in 1910. The Korean Kempeitai developed into a unique gendarmerie organization known as the Kempei keisatsu, which operated from 1,642 police stations and recruited large numbers of Korean nationals. The Kempeitai was instrumental in suppressing Korean opinion and political participation, and played a major role in recruiting comfort women and in conscripting guards for prisoner of war camps. It carried out the empire's policies of suppressing Korean national identity, language, customs, and culture; it also promoted Japanese organizations and spread pro-Japan propaganda through Korea's daily newspapers.

In 1931–1932, Japan invaded and occupied Manchuria and established the puppet state of Manchukuo. It became a major zone of operations for the Kempeitai, with 18,000 personnel in the area by 1932. Many of Japan's wartime leaders built their reputations and careers as officers in the Manchurian Kempeitai, including Lieutenant General Toranosuke Hashimoto, commander of the Manchukuo Kempeitai (1932–1934) and later Vice Minister of War; General Shizuichi Tanaka, commander of the Kwantung Army's Kempeitai (1937–1938) and later commander of Tokyo Kempeitai (1938–1940) and Eastern District Army; and notoriously General Hideki Tojo, commander of the Kwantung Army Kempeitai (1935–1937) and later Minister of War, Prime Minister, and Chief of the General Staff.

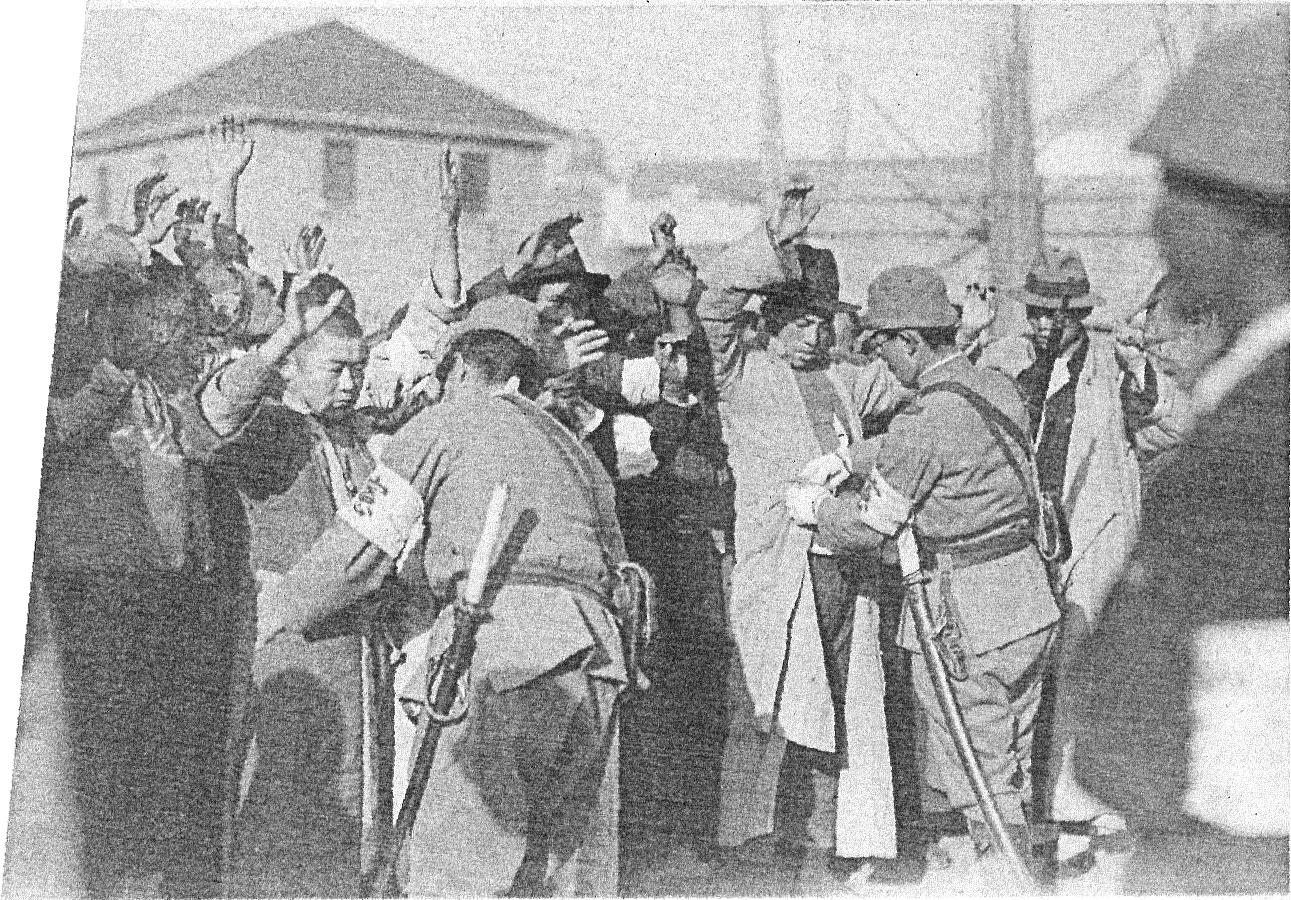
Kempeitai personnel searching captured Chinese soldiers after the Fall of Nanking in 1937

As further foreign territories fell under Japanese military occupation during the 1930s and the early 1940s, the Kempeitai recruited large numbers of locals in those territories. Taiwanese and Koreans were extensively used as auxiliaries to guard POWs and police the newly occupied areas in Southeast Asia, and the Kempeitai also carried out recruitment activities among the populations of French Indochina, Malaya, and other territories.

The Kempeitai also operated on the Japanese home islands, where it was responsible for maintaining public order as a secret police, alongside the civilian Special Higher Police (in the 1920s there were mentions of a joint Tokkō–Kempeitai organization). The two organizations served as public censors and overseers of private morals and thought. All prisoners were presumed guilty on arrest; examinations of suspects took place in secret, and the use of torture to extract confessions of guilt was commonplace. While its suspects were nominally subject to civilian judicial proceedings, they were often denied habeas corpus (the right to have one's case tried before a court). The Kempeitai had close ties with the Tokumu Kikan military intelligence agency, which reported directly to the Imperial General Headquarters; the organizations jointly carried out clandestine and covert operation, counterinsurgency, counterintelligence, espionage, fifth-column, human intelligence, internal security, propaganda, and public security activities. After Tojo was appointed as Vice Minister of War in 1938 and the National Diet passed an anti-espionage act in 1939 which expanded its power, the Kempeitai became even more visible and active in Japan.

From 1933 to 1941, the Soviet Union operated a spy ring in Tokyo led by Richard Sorge and Hotsumi Ozaki, which gathered intelligence on Japanese intentions in the Far East. By 1940 both the Kempeitai and Tokkō suspected an espionage ring operating in Japan, though neither organization shared information with the other. The Germans began to suspect that Sorge, who was posing as a journalist sympathetic to Nazism, was a Soviet agent, and in mid-1940 informed the Kempeitai that Sorge was under surveillance. The Kempeitai and Tokkō investigated and concluded that Sorge was a Soviet spy, and also came to suspect Ozaki, who was arrested on 15 October 1941. Information from his interrogation by the Tokkō implicated Sorge, who was arrested on 18 October. Both men were tried, and executed by hanging on 7 November 1944.

The Kempeitai was disbanded after Japan's surrender in 1945, upon which its officers were ordered to disperse and vanish. Nonetheless, many of its former commanders were convicted of war crimes. The post-war Self-Defense Forces military police corps, the Keimutai, has no jurisdiction over civilians.

== Organization and strength ==
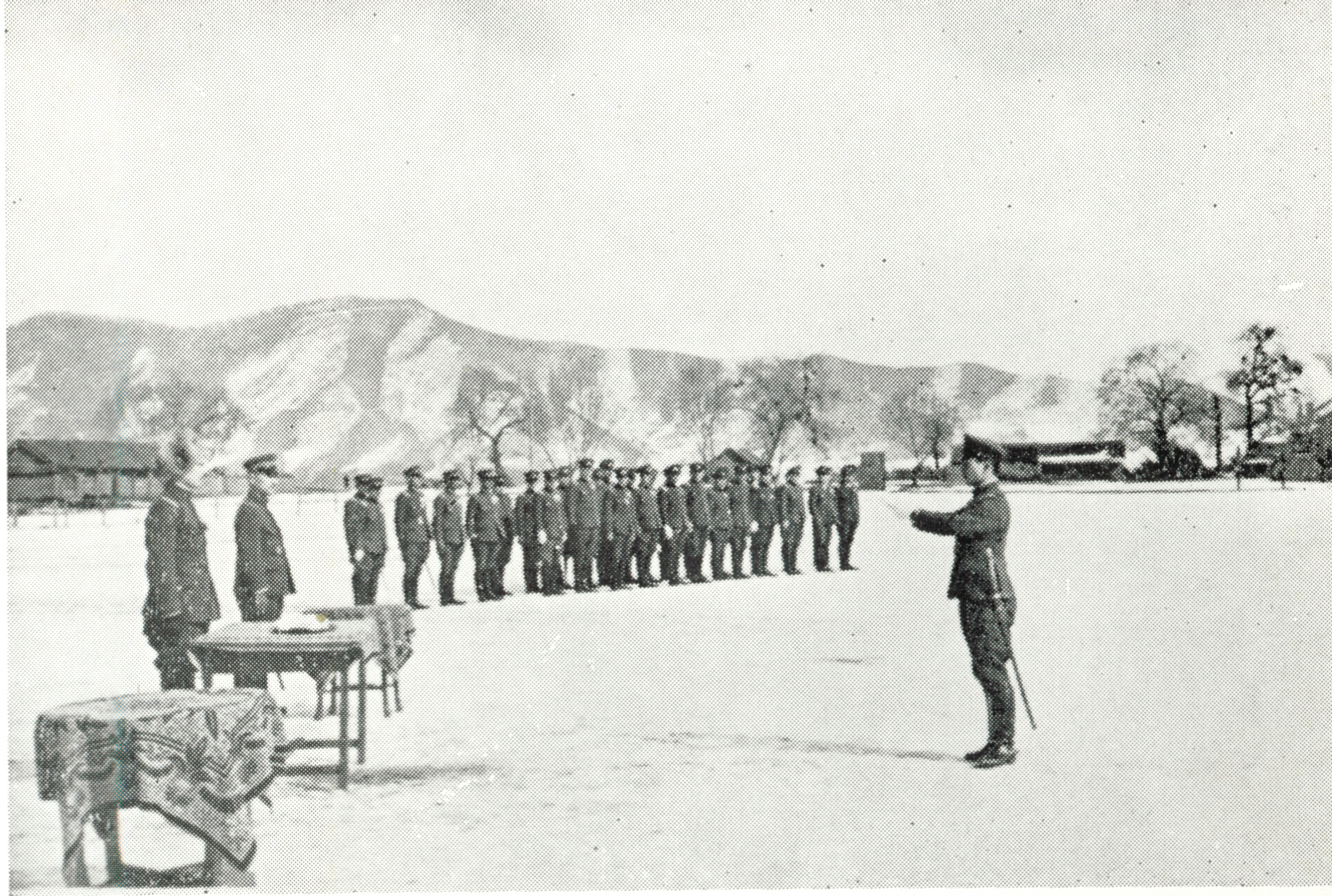
Graduation ceremony for Kempeitai cadets in Manchuria, late 1930s

The Kempeitai formed a branch of the IJA through its Administration Bureau, which was led by a provost marshal general who was answerable to the Minister of War. In Japan during peacetime, the Kempeitai was answerable to the Ministry of War for regular military duties, the Home Ministry for civil police duties, and Ministry of Justice for law administration duties. In war zones, the Kempeitai came under the control of that area's military commander.

The Kempeitai was made up of field officers (sakan), non-commissioned officers (kashikan) and superior privates (jotohei). When needed, first- and second-class privates were attached from other services. A Kempeitai headquarters was established under each army of the IJA, and commanded by a major general or colonel. Each headquarters controlled two to three field offices, each commanded by a lieutenant colonel, 22 field officers (sakan), and 352 other ranks. Each field office was divided into sections (buntai) commanded by a captain or lieutenant and 65 other ranks, in turn divided into detachments (bunkentai) commanded by a second lieutenant or warrant officer and 20 other ranks. Each detachment had sections for police (keimu han), administration (naikin han), and special duties (tokumu han). Yasen Kempeitai operated in forward areas as field units. Volunteer ethnic Kempeitai auxiliaries, established under laws in 1919 and 1937, were allowed a highest rank of sergeant major.

Kempeitai officers were usually graduates of the Imperial Japanese Army Academy or Army War College. In peacetime, officers typically had one year of training, while non-commissioned officers were trained for six months. In 1937, Western sources estimated there were 315 Kempeitai officers and 6,000 personnel of other ranks; in 1942, the U.S. Army estimated there were 601 Kempeitai officers in its Handbook on Japanese Military Forces. Japanese records show a peak of 34,834 Kempeitai officers and personnel during the war: 10,679 in Japan, 6,115 in central China, 4,946 in the Kwantung Army, 4,253 in north China, 1,927 in Korea, 1,094 in south China, 937 in Thailand, 829 in the Philippines, 758 in Malaya, 745 in Formosa, 540 in Burma, 538 in Java, 479 in occupied French Indochina, 387 in Sumatra, 362 in Singapore, 156 in Borneo, and 89 in the South Seas. Included within these numbers were Taiwanese, Malays, Chinese, Cambodians, and Vietnamese. In Indo-China the Kempeitai particularly recruited from members of the Cao Dai religious sect.

== Activities and war crimes ==
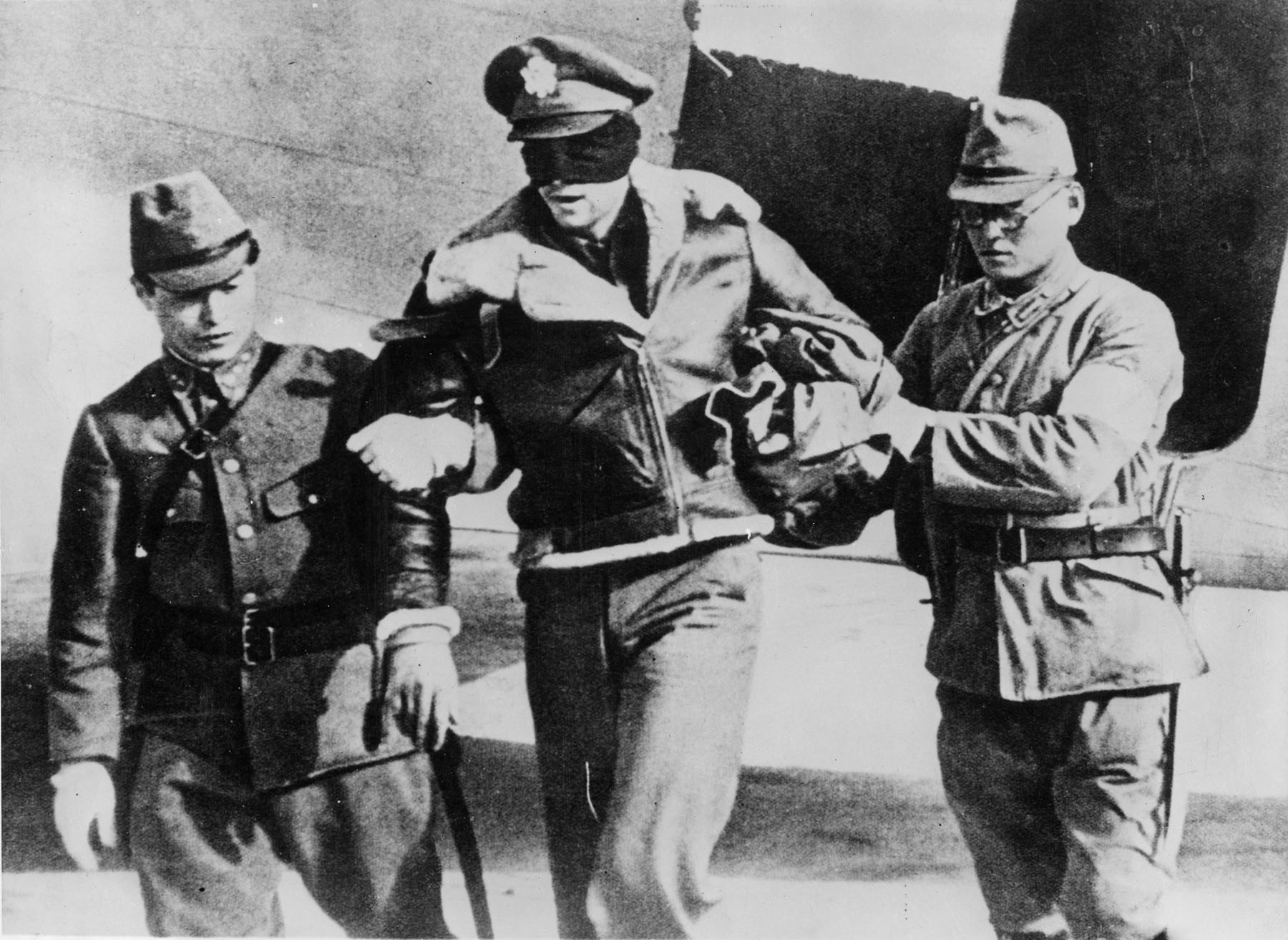
Doolittle Raider U.S. Army Air Force Lieutenant Robert L. Hite is led from a Japanese transport plane by men of the Kempeitai. Although subjected to waterboarding, Hite survived the war.

In Japan, the Kempeitai often assisted local civilian law authorities (though it was not a gendarmerie), and targeted students, farmers, socialists, communists, pacifists, foreign workers, and any showing irreverence for the emperor. In occupied territories and war zones, the Kempeitai was responsible for issuing travel permits, recruiting labor, arresting members of resistances, requisitioning food and supplies, spreading propaganda, and suppressing anti-Japanese sentiment. The organization was notorious for its brutality in suppressing dissent, and was responsible for widespread abuses, including forced labor, torture, and executions. Torture methods were taught at Kempeitai schools, and included flogging, waterboarding, burning and scalding, administration of electric shocks, knee joint separation, suspension from ropes, kneeling on sharp edges, fingernail and toenail removal, and digit fracturing.

The Kempeitai also ran Japan's network of prisoner of war (POW) and civilian internment camps, which treated detainees in violation of the Geneva Convention of 1929 (not ratified by Japan). A total of 350,000 prisoners were taken and housed in 176 camps in Japan and about 500 in occupied territories. The Kempeitai pressed many POWs and civilians into slave labour gangs for war work, and subjected them to torture, including standing inside small cages set on top of red ant nests and lashing to trees with barbed wire. Prisoners were forced to sign non-escape oaths, and those who escaped and were recaptured were subjected to beatings and torture as examples in front of other prisoners. 27 percent of Allied POWs taken by Japan during the war died in captivity. Camp guards, often Korean and Formosan, were also abused by Kempeitai superiors.

After the Doolittle Raid in April 1942, captured Allied airmen were accused of intentionally attacking civilians so were treated as war criminals rather than POWs, and were thus made subject to the death penalty. The U.S. airmen captured in China after the raid were subjected to harsh treatment and interrogation by the Kempeitai; three were sentenced to death and executed in October 1942, while five others had their sentences commuted to life imprisonment. They were subjected to mental torture in the form of mock executions. Every airman captured in occupied territory after the raid was starved, interrogated, and tortured by the Kempeitai; by May 1945, the Kempeitai decided that formal trials were a waste of time, and executed airmen (often by beheading) soon after their courts-martial had been approved. In December 1944, three U.S. airmen were arrested by the Kempeitai at Hangzhou; they were paraded through the streets, ridiculed, beaten, and tortured before being doused with petrol and burned alive. In February 1945, six British airmen were captured in southern Burma and interrogated by the Kempeitai before being lined up on the edge of a trench, blindfolded, and beheaded by a Kempeitai officer; their bodies were used for bayonet practice. In May 1945, a U.S. aviator shot down and injured near Saigon in French Indochina was left untreated for three days before being interrogated by Kempeitai, then killed with procaine. In July 1945, 15 U.S. airmen were captured and interrogated by the Kempeitai near Hiroshima; 12 died in the U.S. atomic bombing of the city on August 6, of which two were possibly clubbed to death at Hiroshima Castle by the Kempeitai, and two were possibly stoned to death by civilians.

The Kempeitai organized regular and violent reprisals against populations in Japan's occupied territories. After the Doolittle Raid, it carried out reprisals against thousands of Chinese civilians accused of helping U.S. airmen. In 1942, it carried out the Sook Ching, a mass killing in Singapore after it fell to the Japanese, and in October 1943, in the Double Tenth incident, arrested and tortured 57 people in response to an Allied raid on Singapore Harbour; 15 of them died in custody. In 1943–1944, the Kempeitai arrested 1,918 persons on Java, of whom 743 died while in custody (439 of whom were executed). In March 1944, the Kempeitai brutally suppressed a riot in Tasikmalaya in western Java, killing several hundred Muslims; Muslim leader Zainal Mustafa and 23 of his disciples were later executed. In September 1944, the Kempeitai executed the Rajah of Loeang and 95 natives from the Loeang and Sermata Islands for failing to turn over guerrillas who had allegedly assassinated several officers. On 7 July 1945, the Kempeitai killed 600 inhabitants of the village of Kalagon in the Moulmein region of southeast Burma in the Kalagon massacre as reprisal for local guerrilla attacks after interrogation, beatings, and the rape of women and children did not elicit information.

The Chinese Kempeitai was responsible for providing human test subjects, codenamed maruta ('logs'), for the Army's biological warfare research program under Unit 731 near Harbin, Manchuria. Thousands of uncooperative prisoners and civilians were transported in windowless prison cars to the unit's facility under the Kempeitai's Human Materials Procurement Arm and were subjected to medical experimentation, including vivisection, artificially-induced illness, frostbite, and simulated combat wounds. More experiments, also facilitated by the Kempeitai, were conducted on Allied POWs in the southeast Pacific. In February 1944, an outbreak of tetanus among hundreds of laborers in Java, possibly tied to the biological warfare program, was traced to contaminated vaccines. The Kempeitai accused Achmad Muchtar of the Eykman Institute in Jakarta, who treated many of the victims, of deliberately contaminating the vaccines to sabotage labor for the Japanese, and imprisoned him for nine months before beheading him and running over his body with a steamroller.

The Kempeitai also organized extensive criminal networks, which extorted vast amounts of money from businesses and civilians in areas where they operated; the forced prostitution system for the Imperial Army, whose victims were known as comfort women; and the all-female Tokyo Rose radio propaganda broadcasts.

== Active units ==
The Kempeitai operated commands on the Japanese mainland and throughout all occupied and captured overseas territories during the Pacific War. The external units operating outside Japan were:

- First Field Kempeitai
  - Commanded by Major-General Kōichi Ōno from August 1941 to 23 January 1942 and probably based in China with the Japanese Kwantung Army
- Second Field Kempeitai
  - Attached to the 25th Army and based in Singapore from 1942, the unit was under the command of Lieutenant-Colonel Oishi Masayuki.
  - In January 1944, Malaya came under the responsibility of Third Field Kempeitai Major-General Masanori Kojima.
- Third Field Kempeitai
  - Drawn from a Manchurian Kenpei Training Regiment in July 1941, attached to the 16th Army and based in Java and Sumatra from 1942.
  - The unit headquarters were in Batavia under the command of Lieutenant-Colonel Kuzumi Kenzaburo.
  - By war's end, the unit had 772 members.
- Fourth Field Kempeitai
- Fifth Field Kempeitai
- Sixth Field Kempeitai
  - Attached to the 8th Area Army based at Rabaul, Papua New Guinea
- Seventh Field Kempeitai
- Eighth Field Kempeitai
  - Attached to the 2nd Army on Halmahera, Indonesia
- Ninth Field Kempeitai
- Tenth Field Kempeitai
- Eleventh Field Kempeitai
  - Commanded by Colonel Shōshichi Kamisago from November 1941 to August 1942, when he became head of the 1st Army Kempeitai Southern Section

== Equipment ==
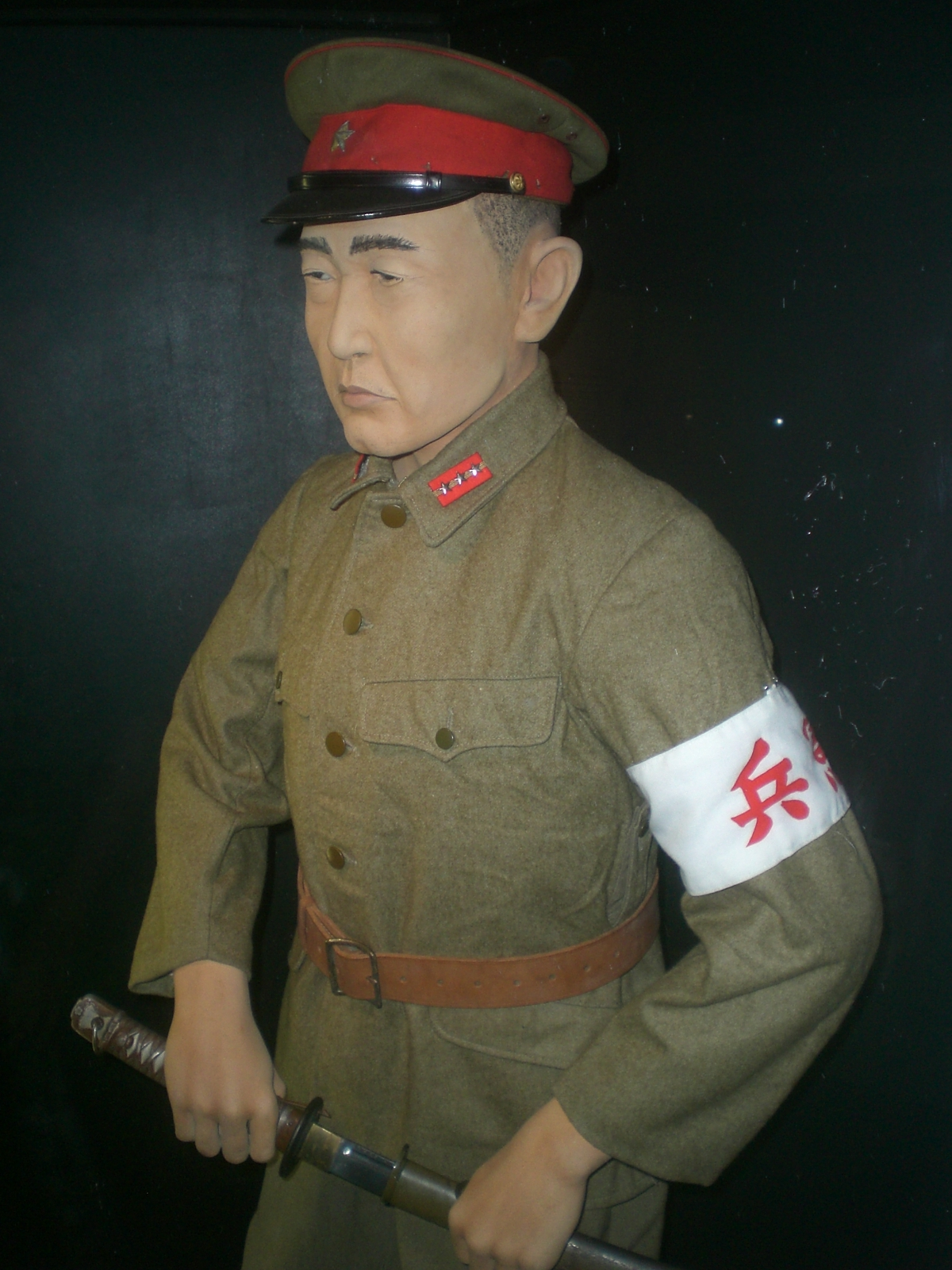
A Kempeitai uniform for a 曹長 (Sōchō)

=== Uniform ===
Kempeitai personnel wore either the standard M1938 field uniform or the cavalry uniform with high black leather boots. Civilian clothes were also authorized with rank badges or the Japanese Imperial chrysanthemum worn under the jacket lapel.

Uniformed personnel also wore a black chevron on their uniforms and a white armband on the left arm with the characters ken (憲; 'law') and hei (兵; 'soldier'), together read as kempei or kenpei, which translates to "military police".

Until 1942, a full dress uniform comprising a red kepi, gold and red waist sash, dark blue tunic and trousers with black facings was authorized for Kempeitai officers on ceremonial occasions. Rank insignia comprised gold Austrian knots and epaulettes.

=== Weapons ===
Kempeitai officers were armed with a cavalry sabre and pistol, while enlisted men had a pistol and bayonet. Junior NCOs carried a shinai (竹刀; 'bamboo kendo sword'), especially when dealing with prisoners.

== See also ==
- Tokubetsu Keisatsutai, the military police of the Imperial Japanese Navy
- Fujiwara Kikan, military unit specializing in infiltration and psyops
- Internal security
- History of espionage
- List of Japanese spies, 1930–1945
- Police services of the Empire of Japan (Keishichō, until 1945)
- Unit 100
- Fukushima Yasumasa (Kempeitai founder)
- Masahiko Amakasu responsible for the Amakasu Incident
- Tenko (TV series)
- The Man in the High Castle (TV series)
