= Socialist Party (Indonesia) =

Political party in Indonesia (1945–1948)

Socialist Party Partai Sosialis
- Abbreviation: PS
- Chairman: Sutan Sjahrir (1945–1947); Amir Sjarifuddin (1947–1948)
- Founded: 13 November 1945
- Dissolved: 12 February 1948
- Merger of: Socialist People's Party; Socialist Party of Indonesia
- Succeeded by: Socialist Party of Indonesia (Sjahrir)
- Ideology: Socialism
- Political position: Left-wing

The Socialist Party (Indonesian: Partai Sosialis, PS) was a socialist political party in Indonesia which existed from 1945 to 1948. The party was founded as a merger between the Socialist People's Party (Paras) of Prime Minister Sutan Sjahrir and Socialist Party of Indonesia (Parsi) of Defence Minister Amir Sjarifuddin. Sjahrir became chairman of the unified party, whilst Sjarifuddin became vice-chairman.

In January 1946, the party and its youth wing Pesindo, along with all other major political forces at the time, joined the Tan Malaka-led national front (Persatuan Perdjuangan). By February the same year, the Socialist Party had come to view the Persatuan Perdjuangan as an attempt to replace the existing government, and the party and Pesindo withdrew. Following their withdrawal, the Persatuan Perdjuangan was able to pressure Sjahrir to resign from his position as Prime Minister. Sukarno offered the Persatuan Perdjuangan to form a new cabinet, but such a government never materialized due to conflicts inside the front. As the Persatuan Perdjuangan couldn't form a government, Sjahrir was again offered to form a government.

In May 1946 the government launched Konsentrasi Nasional, a coalition intended to compete with Persatuan Perdjuangan. The Socialist Party and Pesindo became core constituents of KN, along with the Communist Party of Indonesia (PKI), Masjumi, the Labour Party of Indonesia and various mass organizations. Soon, KN and Persatuan Perdjuangan clashed, as Persatuan Perdjuangan initiated militant struggle against the government. Sjahrir was kidnapped by Persatuan Perdjuangan (but was released soon thereafter).

In October 1946, the government was broadened to include leaders from several political forces. A new pro-government coalition, Sajap Kiri, was founded to support the Linggadjati Agreement with the Dutch government. Sajap Kiri consisted of the Socialist Party, Pesindo, PKI and the Labour Party of Indonesia.

Towards late 1946, the Central Indonesian National Committee (KNIP) was enlarged. The Socialist Party was given 35 out of 514 seats.

In May 1947 the Dutch government issued an ultimatum to the Indonesian government, demanding Dutch de jure sovereignty over Indonesia until 1949. This ultimatum created a split inside the Socialist Party, as Sjahrir expressed some conciliatory attitudes towards the Dutch positions. Sjahrir faced opposition from Sjarifuddin's followers and Sajap Kiri, and in June 1947 Sjahrir resigned as Prime Minister. When Sjahrir had travelled to address the United Nations, Sjarifuddin was appointed acting party chairman. When Hatta formed a new government, the Sjajrir-led faction of the Socialist Party supported it whilst the rest of Sajap Kiri opposed it.

Sjahrir and his followers left the Socialist Party, and on 12 February 1948, they formed the Socialist Party of Indonesia (PSI). PSI was joined by 4 out of 5 Socialist Party representatives in the KNIP Working Group and 19 out of 35 Socialist KNIP members. Most of the party grassroots stayed with Sjarifuddin, however.

In August 1948 the Socialist Party issued a statement of self-criticism, stating that the foundation of Parsi in 1945 had been a mistake, that a communist party should have been built instead and that the merger with 'rightwing' and 'reformist' Paras should not have taken place.
