= Sahala Hamonangan Simatupang =

Sahala Hamonangan Simatupang Bc.A.P.
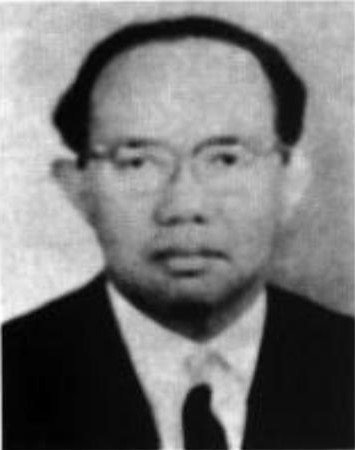

Deputy Minister of Post and Telecommunications
- In office 31 March 1966 – 28 July 1966
- President: Sukarno
- Preceded by: Himself (as Assistant Minister for Post, Giro, and Telecommunications Affairs)
- Succeeded by: Soehardjono (as Director General of Post and Telecommunications)

Assistant Minister for Post, Giro, and Telecommunications Affairs
- In office 18 November 1965 – 24 February 1966
- President: Sukarno
- Preceded by: Himself (as Director General of Post and Telecommunications)
- Succeeded by: Himself (as Deputy Minister of Post and Telecommunications)

Personal details
- Born: 7 July 1918 Sidikalang, Dutch East Indies
- Died: 16 November 1992 (aged 74) Jakarta, Indonesia
- Resting place: Menteng Pulo Public Cemetery
- Party: Indonesian Christian Party
- Relations: T. B. Simatupang (brother)

Sahala Hamonangan Simatupang (7 July 1918 – 16 November 1992) was an Indonesian politician and civil servant who became the Director General of Post and Telecommunications, Director General of the National Post and Telecommunication Company, Assistant Minister for Post, Giro, and Telecommunications Affairs, Deputy Minister of Post and Telecommunications, and Secretary General of the Department of Transportation.

== Early life and education ==
Sahala Hamonangan Simatupang was born on 7 July 1918 in the town of Sidikalang, as the first son of Sutan Mangaraja Soaduan Simatupang and Mina Boru Sibutar. His given name, Sahala Hamonangan, translates as "Authority of Victory" in the Batak language.

Sahala Hamonangan Simatupang began his career at the Meer Uitgebreid Lager Onderwijs (equivalent to junior high school) in Tarutung from 1932 to 1935. After graduating, he moved to Batavia and continued his studies at the Algemene Middelbare School (equivalent to high school) from 1935 to 1938. He then continued his studies at the Post, Telegraph, and Telecommunication Academy in Bandung from 5 November 1938 until 1941.

== In the communication service ==
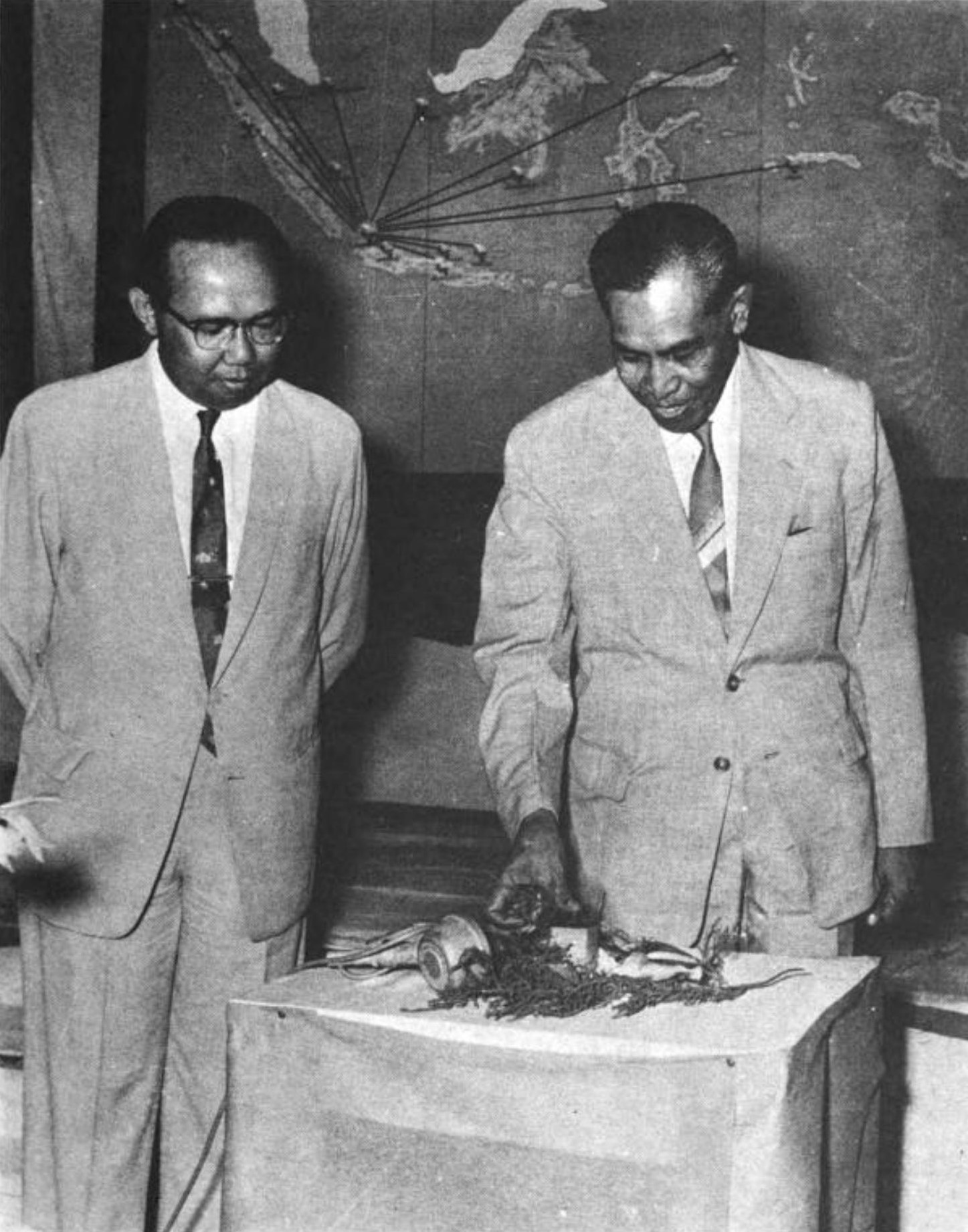
Sahala Hamonangan Simatupang (left) with Johannes Leimena during the official ceremony that marks the beginning of the usage of telex in Indonesia on 4 January 1961.

Following the proclamation of Indonesian Independence, on 1 October 1945, the Central Post, Telegraph, and Telephone Office of Sumatra was formed. Simatupang was appointed as the assistant to Noermatias, the Inspector for the Post, Telegraph, and Telephone Regions (Pengawasan Daerah Pos dan Telekomunikasi). A year later, Simatupang was appointed by his party, Perchi, to represent Sumatra in the Central Indonesian National Committee.

After the Indonesian National Revolution ended, Simatupang was appointed as the Head of the Post and Telegraph Inspection for the 1st Region, which was based in Jakarta. Shortly after that, on 7 February 1952, Simatupang replaced the retired M. Soedibjo as the Head of the Administration Service. Following the retirement of Oesadi as the Head of the Postal Service, Simatupang replaced his position on 1 July 1959.

In 1960, Simatupang was appointed as the acting Director General of Post and Telecommunications, replacing Raden Samdjoen. During his term, he initiated the multiservice postal system in Indonesia, which integrated the giro service into the postal service. He also began the construction of microwave networking system between Java and Bali, the introduction of the electromechanical devices (EMD) from Siemens, and the automatization of the telegraph system with the telex.

Following the enactment of the decree which liquidated the Post and Telecommunications Service and established the National Post and Telecommunication Company on 1 January 1962, Simatupang was appointed as the Director General of the National Post and Telecommunication Company on 24 May 1963. He was officially inaugurated by the Minister of Land Transportation and Post, Telecommunications and Tourism, Djatikusumo, on 27 May 1963. The inauguration ceremony also marked the official establishment of the National Post and Telecommunication Company.

On 18 November 1965, Simatupang was named as the assistants for Minister of Land Transportation and Post, Telecommunications and Tourism, Djatikoesoemo. He was inaugurated alongside five other assistants on 18 November 1965.

Following the formation of the Revised Dwikora Cabinet on 24 February 1966, the status of the Assistant Minister for the Post and Telecommunications affair was upgraded to Minister. Simatupang was relieved from his office, and Air Marshal Soerjadi Soerjadarma was appointed to replace his position. This status did not last long, as a month later, the cabinet was dissolved and was replaced with the Second Revised Dwikora Cabinet. The status of the Minister of Post and Telecommunication was downgraded to Deputy Minister, and Simatupang was inaugurated for the office on 31 March 1966. Simatupang held the office for three months until the formation of the Ampera Cabinet on 28 July 1966.

A year after his office was dissolved, Simatupang was promoted to the post of Secretary General of the Department of Transportation, replacing Muhammad Effendi Saleh. He held the office from 1967 until 1968.

== Later life and death ==
After his resignation from the Department of Transportation, Simatupang worked at the Southeast Asian Agency for Regional Transport and Communication Development in Kuala Lumpur, Malaysia, from 1972 until 1982. He is also known as the founder and commissioner of Bumi Asih Group Company and the President Director of Bank Ina Perdana.

Since 1991, Simatupang was diagnosed with heart disease. In an attempt to cure the disease, on 19 August 1992, his family brought Simatupang went to Eindhoven, Netherlands for a coronary artery bypass surgery. Although the disease was cured, he was diagnosed with kidney complications after he returned to Indonesia.

Simatupang died at 04.50 on 16 November 1992. He was buried at the Menteng Pulo Public Cemetery at 14.00 on 18 November 1992.

== Personal life ==
Simatupang was married to Siti Rukaya Hutapea. The marriage resulted in four children.

== Bibliography ==
- Tim Penyusun (1996). 50 Tahun Peranan Pos dan Telekomunikasi (in Indonesian). Directorate General of Post and Telecommunications.
- Simatupang, Tahi Bonar (1996). The Fallacy of a Myth. Pustaka Sinar Harapan. ISBN 9789794163580.
- Panitia Penyusun Naskah Buku 20 Tahun Indonesia Merdeka (1965). 20 Tahun Indonesia Merdeka (in Indonesian). Vol. VI. Jakarta: Ministry of Information.
- Panitia Perumus (1990a). Sejarah Pos dan Telekomunikasi di Indonesia (in Indonesian). Vol. III. Jakarta: Directorate General of Post and Telecommunications.
- Panitia Perumus (1990b). Sejarah Pos dan Telekomunikasi di Indonesia (in Indonesian). Vol. IV. Jakarta: Directorate General of Post and Telecommunications.
- Tim Penyusun Sejarah (1970). Seperempat Abad Dewan Perwakilan Rakjat Republik Indonesia [A Quarter Century of the People's Representative Council of the Republic of Indonesia] (PDF) (in Indonesian). Jakarta: Sekretariat DPR-GR. Archived from the original (PDF) on 2023-04-07.
