= Tun Kyaw Nyein =

Tun Kyaw Nyein (Burmese: ထွန်းကျော်ငြိမ်း; pronounced [tuɴ tjoʊ̯ ɲeɪɴ]; born May 7, 1949) is a Burmese public intellectual, trained medical doctor, retired university administrator, and former political prisoner. He is the third son of Daw Nwe Nwe Yee and U Kyaw Nyein, a leading figure in Burma's independence movement and post-independence politics during the era of parliamentary democracy.

== Early life and education ==
Tun Kyaw Nyein was born on 7 May 1949 in Rangoon, Burma to parent Kyaw Nyein and his wife Nwe Nwe Yee. He graduated from Methodist English High School, Rangoon, in 1966. From 1966 to 1973, he studied medicine at the Institute of Medicine (1), Rangoon and began practicing medicine in 1974. He received a master's degree in health science in Western Illinois University in 1984 and a Ph.D. degree in Community Health from the University of Tennessee at Knoxville in 1989.

== Political activism ==
A leader of the student uprising in 1974 in Rangoon, Tun Kyaw Nyein was arrested by the military intelligence of the Ne Win government in December 1974. He was given a seven years prison sentence by a military tribunal and kept two and a half years in solitary confinement. He was released in October 1979. After his release, he worked as a medical researcher. Due to persecution of the Kyaw Nyein family under the Ne Win government, he left for the United States in 1982.

== Selected publications ==
Anger and Anxiety in Multi-Ethnic Myanmar. Mizzima, 28 June 2013.
