= Socialist People's Party (Indonesia) =

Socialist People's Party Partai Rakjat Sosialis
- Chairman: Sutan Sjahrir
- Founded: 1945
- Dissolved: December 1945
- Merged into: Socialist Party
- Headquarters: Jakarta
- Ideology: Socialism
- Political position: Left-wing
- Colors: Red

The Socialist People's Party (Indonesian: Partai Rakjat Sosialis, abbreviated Paras) was a political party in Indonesia. It was founded in Djakarta in 1945, and Sutan Sjahrir was the chairman of the party. In December 1945, at a meeting in Cheribon, the party merged with the Socialist Party of Indonesia, forming the Socialist Party with Sjahrir as chairman.
