= Kalagon massacre =

1945 massacre in Burma by Japan

- Part of the Burma Campaign of World War II
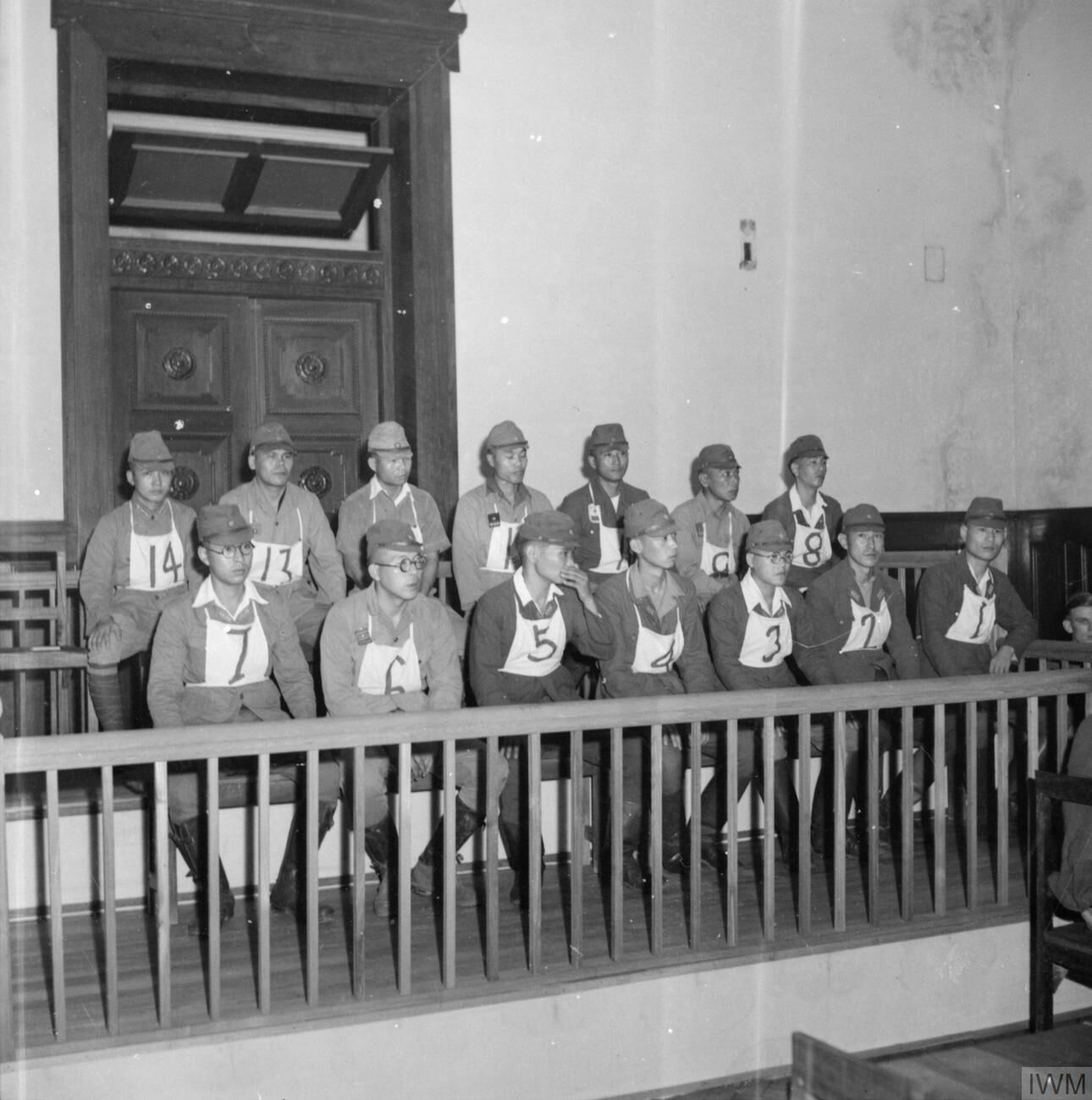
- Japanese prisoners in the dock during the first war crimes trial to be held in Rangoon, Burma. These men were charged with the murder of 637 civilians in the village of Kalagon (1946).
- Location: 16°32′57″N 97°43′46″E; Kalagon, Burma
- Date: 7 July 1945
- Target: Villagers
- Attack type: Massacre, war rape, torture
- Deaths: 600–1,000
- Perpetrator: Imperial Japanese Army: Major Ichikawa Seigi
- Motive: Punishment for aiding British commandos

On 7 July 1945, the Kalagon massacre was committed against inhabitants of Kalagon, Burma (present-day Myanmar), by members of the 3rd Battalion, 215th Regiment and the OC Moulmein Kempeitai of the Imperial Japanese Army. These units had been ordered by Major General Seiei Yamamoto, chief of staff of the 33rd Army, to sweep the area for guerrillas reportedly teamed with British paratroopers.

The Japanese occupied the village, rounded up all the inhabitants and took them to different buildings, for questioning. Women and children were raped and beaten. After it was confirmed that they had aided British commandos, Major Ichikawa Seigi ordered the entire village to be massacred. The inhabitants were taken in groups of four to ten people to nearby wells, blindfolded, and bayoneted, and their bodies were dumped in the wells. The village was then burned to the ground. An estimated 600 to 1,000 villagers died in the massacre.

The Japanese kidnapped 10 female survivors who agreed to act as "spies", although it is believed that they were instead used as comfort women. Two of them escaped, but the others disappeared.

== Prosecutions ==
Because the Japanese had conducted the massacre rather hastily, multiple villagers survived the massacre. The survivors became witnesses in war crimes proceedings against some of the participants in the massacre.

In 1946, a British military court tried Seigi and 13 other soldiers for participating in the massacre. Each of them was tried on two counts:

1. Participating in the massacre of the villagers
2. Participating in the beating, torture, wounding, and other maltreatment of the villagers

Seigi also faced a third charge for kidnapping the women. Ten of them were found guilty. Seven of them were found guilty on both counts, and three others were only found guilty on the second count. Seigi was found guilty on all counts.

Seigi and three officers who supervised the massacre were sentenced to death. The court said Seigi would be hanged, while the other three men would be shot by firing squads. As for the other three soldiers deemed complicit in the massacre, the court found that they had not directly participated in the massacre. Instead, they had acted as accessories, As such, each of them were given 10-year sentences.

=== Individual defendants and sentences ===
Name	Charges	Sentence	Count 1	Count 2
*Major Ichikawa Seigi	Ordered massacre	Death by hanging	Guilty	Guilty
Captain Sakamaki Saburo	Provided transportation to accomplices and witnessed interrogations	10 years imprisonment	Guilty	Guilty
Captain Okubo Yozo	Relayed the orders to carry out the massacre	10 years imprisonment	Guilty	Guilty
Captain Yanagisawa Izumu	Supervised the massacre	Death by firing squad	Guilty	Guilty
Captain Midorikawa Hisashi	Supervised the massacre	Death by firing squad	Guilty	Guilty
Second Lieutenant Usui Kiyohiro	Accused of raping a woman	Acquitted	Not guilty	Not guilty
Lieutenant Tajima Ichiro	Supervised the massacre	Death by firing squad	Guilty	Guilty
Lieutenant Takei Shozo	Stood guard outside of the village as the massacre happened	10 years imprisonment	Guilty	Guilty
Captain Higashi Noburo	Accused of instructing his subordinates to use force during interrogations	Acquitted	Not guilty	Not guilty
Warrant Officer Fujiwara Ryozo	Abusing villagers during interrogations	5 years imprisonment	Not guilty	Guilty
Sergeant Major Kobayashi Akira	Abusing villagers during interrogations	5 years imprisonment	Not guilty	Guilty
Sergeant Nagata Teshiyuki	Not involved	Acquitted	Not guilty	Not guilty
Sergeant Nomoto Kinni	Abusing villagers during interrogations	7 years imprisonment	Not guilty	Guilty
Corporal Morimoto Seiichi	Served as a cook for the military police	Acquitted	Not guilty	Not guilty
*Seigi also faced a third charge for kidnapping the women

Each of the sentences were confirmed upon review. Seigi and his three condemned codefendants were executed on 15 July 1946. The others were sent to a prison in Rangoon to serve their sentences. In mid-1951, those still in prison were transferred to Sugamo Prison in Japan to serve the remainder of their sentences.

General Heitarō Kimura, one of the defendants at the International Military Tribunal for the Far East, was charged multiple counts, including his failure to prevent atrocities, including the Kalagon massacre. He was sentenced to death and executed in 1948.

== See also ==
- List of massacres in Burma (Myanmar)
