= Socialist Party of Indonesia (Parsi) =

Political party in Indonesia

Socialist Party of Indonesia Partai Sosialis Indonesia
- Chairman: Amir Sjarifuddin
- Founded: 13 November 1945
- Dissolved: December 1945
- Merged into: Socialist Party
- Headquarters: Djakarta
- Ideology: Socialism
- Political position: Left-wing
- Colors: Red

The Socialist Party of Indonesia (Indonesian: Partai Sosialis Indonesia, Parsi) was a socialist political party in Indonesia. It was founded at a meeting in Jogjakarta on 13 November 1945. The Defence Minister Amir Sjarifuddin was the chairman of the party. Parsi was largely made up by Amir Sjarifuddin's former colleagues from the wartime resistance struggle in East Java. Some of them originated in Gerindo ('Indonesian People's Movement'), a leftwing, nationalist and pro-Sukarno group active before the war. There were also some persons, like Abdulmadjid, Moewaladi and Tamzil, who had lived in the Netherlands during the war, and taken part in the anti-fascist resistance struggle there. The primary objective of Parsi was the independence of Indonesia from colonial rule, which was to be followed by the construction of a socialist society.

In December 1945, at a meeting in Cheribon, the party merged with the Socialist People's Party (Paras), forming the Socialist Party with Amir Sjarifuddin as vice-chairman. However, even after the merger, the erstwhile Parsi and Paras groups continued to exist as factions inside the new party. Generally speaking, the former Parsi members represented a more radical and populist line. Paras leader Sutan Sjahrir and many of his followers left the Socialist Party in 1948. In August of that year, the Socialist Party issued a statement of self-criticism. The statement said that whilst Parsi had been founded by underground communists, it had not taken the shape of a communist party. Moreover, the statement lamented the merger with the 'rightwing' and 'reformist' Paras. After this point, the former Parsi members were largely the ones who stayed in the Socialist Party whilst former Paras members left alongside Sjahrir. There were however some notable exceptions, like Wijono, who had been a Parsi militant but ended up as one of the main leaders of Sjahrir's new party.
