= Kalagon =

- Village
- Location in Myanmar (Burma)
- Coordinates: 16°32′57″N 97°43′46″E
- Country: Myanmar
- Division: Mon State
- District: Mawlamyine District
- Township: Mawlamyine Township
- Time zone: UTC+6.30 (MMT)

Kalagon is a village in Mon State, Myanmar. The village was the site of a massacre perpetrated by the Imperial Japanese Army on 7 July 1945 during World War II. The 3rd Battalion, 215th Regiment and the OC Moulmein Kempeitai of the Imperial Japanese Army killed around 600 to 1,000 unarmed civilians after information on enemy guerrillas was not forthcoming.
