= Kyaw Nyein =

Burmese politician and revolutionary

U Kyaw Nyein
- ဦးကျော်ငြိမ်း

1st Home Minister of Burma
- In office 4 January 1948 – 2 April 1949
- President: Sao Shwe Thaik
- Preceded by: Office created
- Succeeded by: Ne Win

Minister of Foreign Affairs and Deputy Prime Minister
- In office 14 September 1948 – 2 April 1949
- President: Sao Shwe Thaik
- Preceded by: U Tin Tut (Foreign Minister); Bo Let Ya (Deputy Prime Minister)
- Succeeded by: Dr. E Maung (Foreign Minister); Ne Win (Deputy Prime Minister, Home Minister)

Minister of Cooperatives
- In office 1951–1954
- President: Ba U
- Preceded by: Office created
- Succeeded by: Tun Win

Acting Minister of Foreign Affairs
- In office 1954–1958
- President: Ba U Win Maung

Minister of Industry
- In office 1954–1956
- President: Ba U
- Preceded by: Office created
- Succeeded by: Bo Khin Maung

Deputy Prime Minister of National Economy
- In office 1956–1958
- President: Win Maung
- Preceded by: Office created
- Succeeded by: Office eliminated

Personal details
- Born: 19 January 1913 Pyinmana, Mandalay District, British Burma
- Died: 29 June 1986 (aged 73) Bahan Township, Yangon, Burma
- Party: Burma Socialist Party
- Other political affiliations: AFPFL, Asian Socialist Conference, Anti-Colonial Bureau, People's Revolutionary Party until 1944
- Spouse: Nwe Nwe Yee (m. 1942; died 1992)
- Children: 7, including Tun Kyaw Nyein
- Education: University of Rangoon Mandalay College
- Occupation: Politician, lawyer

Kyaw Nyein (Burmese: ကျော်ငြိမ်း; pronounced [t͡ɕɔ̀ ɲeɪɴ]; 19 January 1913 – 29 June 1986), called honorifically U Kyaw Nyein (Burmese: ဦးကျော်ငြိမ်း;pronounced [ʔú t͡ɕɔ̀ ɲeɪɴ]), was a Burmese lawyer and anti-colonial revolutionary, a leader in Burma's struggle for independence and prominent politician in the first decade after the country gained sovereignty from Britain. He held multiple minister portfolios in the government of Prime Minister U Nu, served as General Secretary of the ruling political alliance, Anti-Fascist People's Freedom League (AFPFL), and was joint General Secretary of the Burma Socialist Party (BSP).

Born in Pyinmana, in Upper Burma, Kyaw Nyein received his higher education at the college in Mandalay and the University of Rangoon. During the university strike of 1936, he became known as member of a group of anti-colonial student leaders that included Aung San, Nu and Raschid. In support of an armed struggle against British colonial rule, he built an underground organization while Aung San went abroad seeking help from the Japanese. During the Second World War and the Japanese occupation of Burma, he served in the government of Dr. Ba Maw and later became active in the anti-Japanese resistance. A close adviser to Aung San in the final struggle for independence and during the negotiations with the Attlee government in London, he was appointed as Minister of Home Affairs in the Governor's Executive Council.

Kyaw Nyein helped to shape the decolonization policies of post-independence Burma, from an active neutral foreign policy to the building of a welfare state, and was particularly focused on the economic development and industrialization of Burma. A moderate Socialist, he supported a Third Force position of post-colonial countries during the Cold War and was an architect of Burma's non-alignment policy. He established special relations with Yugoslavia and Israel and together with his co-leader of the Burma Socialist Party, Ba Swe, initiated the Asian Socialist Conference in 1953. As Minister of Foreign Affairs, he achieved in 1954 a breakthrough in negotiations with Japan on war reparations, which set a model for the Philippines and Indonesia that were in a deadlock with Japan over the same issue.

A rift between him and Prime Minister Nu in 1958 led to a split of the AFPFL that destabilized the government and ushered in a military caretaker regime. In the 1960 General Elections, his party was defeated by U Nu’s Pyidaungsu party. After the coup d’etat of General Ne Win in 1962 and the dismantling of the parliamentary democratic system in Burma, he spent five years in jail. His last public political role was the participation in an advisory committee on constitutional reforms, where he and other veteran politicians of the democratic era recommended to reinstate parliamentary democracy, an advice that went unheeded.

Kyaw Nyein's political life was not without controversies. Recognized as one of the founding fathers of modern Burma, a skilled diplomat, socialist theoretician and one of the most dynamic and brainy politicians in the country’s democratic era, he drew criticism for his law and order policies as home minister at the height of the insurgencies. Burma's communists hold him responsible for their failed revolution and to this day claim he pushed them "into the jungle".

== Early life and education ==
Kyaw Nyein was born January 19, 1913, in Pyinmana, British Burma as third child to Daw Thon and Po Toke, a lawyer and leader of the General Council of Burmese Associations. He attended the King Edward Memorial School in Pyinmana where he befriended Than Tun, who would later become chairman of the Communist Party of Burma (CPB). In 1930, he entered Mandalay College to study science and became engaged in university politics. Together with Thein Pe Myint, U Tun Ohn and other students, he fought against the closing down of Mandalay College. After passing the Intermediate exam in 1933, Kyaw Nyein and Thein Pe Myint transferred from Mandalay College to Rangoon University, where he joined the English Honors program. Following his graduation in 1936, he entered law school and received his law degree in 1939.

== Independence Movement (1933-1947) ==
=== Student activism ===
Kyaw Nyein became involved in student politics at Rangoon University in the academic year 1933/34. While hospitalized in the university infirmary in 1933, he met and befriended freshman student Aung San and later introduced him to Thein Pe Myint and Than Tun. In the same year, he ran in the elections for the executive council of the Rangoon University Student Union (RUSU) together with Thein Pe Myint and Aung San, and after being elected became editor of the RUSU Bulletin. By the end of 1935, the RUSU executive council was dominated by political students and presided over by Nu, a senior law student and friend who described Kyaw Nyein as "an easy conversationalist with a good sense of humour.”

During the university student strike of 1936, Nu, Raschid, Aung San and Kyaw Nyein formed a strike council and set the strike strategy and objectives. As the protests persisted and spread to other schools and colleges in the country, they wrested major concessions from the university administration. Raschid recalled that „the burden of negotiating and operational leadership fell to Aung San, Kyaw Nyein and myself." After the strike, he and the other strike leaders established the All Burma Student Union (ABSU) to organize students nationwide.

In 1937 or 1938, while preparing for his law degree, Kyaw Nyein began to work at the customs department to provide for his parents and support himself and his political friends. In 1939, he founded together with Thakin Mya, Aung San, Ba Swe and Thakin Chit the People's Revolutionary Party (PRP), which organized clandestine activities for a planned armed struggle against the British.

=== Second World War and Japanese Occupation ===
Aung San left Burma in 1940 and established contact with Japanese army intelligence officer Suzuki Keiji. In early 1941, the PRP leadership embraced Aung San's plan for an armed uprising supported by the Japanese intelligence unit Minami Kikan (ja). Kyaw Nyein and other PRP members selected and sent young nationalists -later to be known as the Thirty Comrades- to Japan for military training. In February 1942, he recruited over 200 Burmese soldiers of the Burma Rifles and took them in pilfered trucks to Tharrawaddy where they were supposed to foment a local rebellion together with Ne Win and Bo Yan Aung of the Thirty Comrades before the Japanese troops arrived. The plan failed, and Kyaw Nyein and Ne Win reportedly had to walk back to Yangon by foot.

During the Japanese occupation of Burma, Kyaw Nyein was Cabinet Secretary in the Civil Executive Administration under Prime Minister Dr. Ba Maw, and later served as Vice Minister of Foreign Affairs. In August 1944, he participated in negotiations between members of the Communist Party of Burma, the PRP and the Burma National Army that led to the founding of the anti-Japanese resistance organization, Anti-Fascist Organisation (AFO), which later became the Anti-Fascist People's Freedom League (AFPFL). Kyaw Nyein was a member of the AFO Supreme Council, the Military Council, and the executive committee and assigned as Political Commissar to Division (6), Pyinmana.

=== Struggle for Independence ===
After the war and the return of the British colonial administration, Kyaw Nyein, Thakin Mya, Ba Swe and other AFPFL members founded the Burma Socialist Party (BSP) to counter the growing influence of the Communist Party of Burma (CPB) within the AFPFL, by now the major political alliance and umbrella-organization in Burma's struggle for independence. Thakin Mya became the chairman of the BSP while Ba Swe served as general secretary and Kyaw Nyein as joint secretary. Amidst growing tensions within the AFPFL, Than Tun from the CPB resigned in June 1946 as General Secretary of the AFPFL. In August 1946, Kyaw Nyein was appointed as new General Secretary by the AFPFL Supreme Council presided over by Aung San.

He was an advisor to Aung San in the London Talks with Prime Minister Clement Attlee on Burma's independence in January 1947. Upon his return from London, he was handed the portfolio of Minister for Home and Judiciary in the Governor's Executive Council. He accompanied U Nu in July 1947 to London for further negotiations with Prime Minister Attlee, and on the way back, visited Yugoslavia to study the country's constitution and socialist system as a member of the Special Committee of Burma's Constitutional Assembly. Certain features of the Yugoslav Constitution, particularly those relating to minorities, were eventually incorporated in Burma's 1947 constitution.

== Government under Prime Minister U Nu and Civil War (1948-1949) ==
Kyaw Nyein served as the first post-independence Minister of Home Affairs and in September 1948 assumed additionally the positions of Minister of Foreign Affairs and Deputy Prime Minister in the cabinet of Prime Minister U Nu.

=== Forced Resignation and Defense of Burma's Neutralism ===
In March 1949, at the height of the communist insurgency, Kyaw Nyein and five fellow socialist ministers resigned from the government under unclear circumstances. According to the autobiographical account of one of the ministers, the Chief of Staff of the Armed Forces, General Ne Win had forced their resignation. Ne Win had entered a cabinet meeting alleging that he had struck a deal with the communists who were ready to join the government under the condition that all socialist ministers resigned. Kyaw Nyein and the other socialist ministers stepped aside but demanded that Prime Minister U Nu should remain the head of government. Although Ne Win's overture to the communists eventually failed, he assumed the civilian positions of Deputy Prime Minister and Home Minister in Nu's government until September 1950 while remaining the Chief of Staff of the Armed Forces. During his time in the cabinet, Ne Win tried to tackle the domestic conflicts by getting assistance from the United Kingdom and United States. Together with the Minister for Foreign Affairs E Maung, he visited London and Washington in June 1949 signaling Burma's willingness for a possible Pacific area security pact. At the same time, Prime Minister U Nu suggested in parliament that Burma should enter into economic and defense treaties with countries of economic interest. The reversal of Burma's avowed neutralism since independence was vigorously opposed by Kyaw Nyein. As Secretary General of the AFFPL and majority leader, he led the response in parliament warning in his speech of the dangers of becoming associated with power blocs. In the end, Washington and London sent a small supply of arms but otherwise were reluctant to assist Burma's government in its domestic conflicts. Later in the year, U Nu reaffirmed Burma's neutralism declaring that he was neither interested in anti-Left nor anti-Right but only anti-aggression pacts.

== Political Role and Initiatives under the Government of Prime Minister U Nu (1951-1958) ==
=== Economic Initiatives and Industrialization ===
Kyaw Nyein returned to U Nu's cabinet in 1951 and set up the Ministry of Cooperatives, which he handed over to U Tun Win in 1954 to create the Ministry of Industries. In 1956, he became Deputy Prime Minister of National Economy to oversee and coordinate the industrialization of Burma.

Kyaw Nyein was described as "the brain of Burma's drive to socialism" envisaging socialism as being based on nationalization of industries and developing an import substitution industrialization under government control. However, a moderate Socialist and less doctrinaire than some of his colleagues in the BSP, he gradually moved away from an orthodox socialist nationalization policy in favor of a mixed economy. In March 1957, he declared to create an economic climate that was conducive to foreign investment and private capital, a policy shift that was confirmed by Prime Minister U Nu who announced that the government would divest itself from many economic projects.

Louis Walinsky, an American economic consultant to the U Nu-government, who was highly critical of Burma's focus on import substitution industrialization and advocated greater investments in the agricultural sector, described Kyaw Nyein as one of the outstanding ministers in the administration. He claimed later that "[i]f the dynamic U Kyaw Nyein had been named Minister for Agriculture, rather than Industries, at the very outset of the program, there is no question that Burma’s recovery and development would have proceeded at a steadier and more rapid pace.”

=== Building Burma's Non-alignment Policy ===
==== Asian Socialist Conference (ASC) ====
Already during the independence struggle, Burma's socialists expressed the need for a cooperation of Asian Socialists against colonial rule. While attending the Asian Relations Conference in Delhi in 1947, Kyaw Nyein and other leading members of the Socialist Parties of Burma, India and Indonesia devised the idea of a common venue where Socialist Parties of Asia could discuss issues and exchange experience. In March 1952, Kyaw Nyein headed the 'Preparatory Committee for the first Conference of Asian Socialist Parties' in Rangoon with representatives of the socialist parties of India, Burma and Indonesia. The Preparatory Committee also began publishing Socialist Asia, which would later become the organ of the Asian Socialist Conference. The Asian Socialist Conference was founded at a first conference held in Rangoon January 6 to 15, 1953, and established the ASC as independent socialist organization. The ASC proposed the formation of a 'Third Force' in world politics and adopted a resolution that called for support of democracy, condemning capitalism, communism and imperialism.

==== Establishing Relations with Yugoslavia and Israel ====
As socialist party leader, Minister of Cooperatives, and lead-planner of the Asian Socialist Conference, Kyaw Nyein led in July 1952 a civil-military delegation to Belgrade that opened an era of mutually beneficial relationship between Burma and Yugoslavia. At that time, the two countries found themselves in a similar position. Yugoslavia, ostracized by Stalin and excluded from the economic organization of the Eastern Bloc, was seeking new alliances. Burma was likewise trying to establish international relations outside the East and West Blocs and sought to get access to arms outside a restrictive defense treaty with the United Kingdom that infringed on her sovereignty as the Rangoon-based British Service Mission monitored and evaluated Burma's request for arms purchase from outside sources including the United States. Subsequent to the visit, the two countries exchanged embassies, and Burma, after securing in Yugoslavia a major arms supplier, terminated the contract with the British Services Mission. Invited by Kyaw Nyein to the Asian Socialist Conference to be held in Rangoon the following year, Milovan Đilas led the Yugoslav delegation and established contact with many Asian socialist attending the conference. In 1955, President Tito visited India and Burma, a trip that was considered one of the most consequential and significant for Yugoslav foreign policy as it put the country on the trajectory to the helm of the Non-Alignment Movement.

In December 1952, Kyaw Nyein led also a high-level Burmese delegation to Israel. He considered Israel a kindred country with a social democratic party in power and was interested in the country's expertise in arms production as well as in co-operative settlements such as the Kibbutz. Following his visit, Foreign Minister Moshe Sharett attended the Asian Socialist Conference in Rangoon in 1953, and diplomatic relations were established between the two countries with David Hacohen appointed first Israeli ambassador to Burma.

=== Diplomacy and Foreign Policy ===
==== War Reparation ====
In August 1954, Kyaw Nyein began negotiations with the Japanese government in Tokyo over reparation payments for damages inflicted on Burma during the war. He signed a reparation agreement on 25 September with foreign minister Katsuo Okazaki that set the pattern for later settlements with the Philippines and Indonesia whose negotiations with Japan had been in a deadlock holding up the normalization of diplomatic relations. The settlement was followed by a peace pact between Japan and Burma, which he signed in Rangoon on 6 November 1954. With regard to Kyaw Nyein's foreign policy achievements, an American analyst remarked that

U Kyaw Nyein is the essence of diplomacy. Though his reputation is based upon other factors, it is to his credit that Burmese relations with Yugoslavia have developed with the warmth and certainty of the past few years. As a cabinet member he has tackled the most difficult of all Burma's foreign treaty negotiations—the peace and reparations settlement with Japan.

— John Seabury Thomson, 1957

== Opposition Politics (1958-1968) ==
=== AFPFL Split (1958) ===
A rift between Nu and Kyaw Nyein in 1958 led to an acrimonious split of the AFPFL that pitted the faction of U Nu and Thakin Tin known as the Clean AFPFL against the Stable AFPFL led by Ba Swe and Kyaw Nyein. Helped by votes from the faction of "legal" communists in the parliament, Nu defeated a motion of no confidence tabled against his minority government by Ba Swe and Kyaw Nyein. The rift within the ruling party destabilized the government and ultimately led to a military caretaker regime by the chief of staff of the armed forces, Ne Win. After eighteen months, the caretaker government held general elections in which Nu's party defeated the Stable-AFPFL, and Kyaw Nyein lost his parliament seat.

=== Political Life after the Coup d'état of 1962 ===
After the coup d'état in March 1962, the Revolutionary Council led by General Ne Win dissolved all political parties and other institutions of parliamentary democracy. Kyaw Nyein was detained in August 1963 and released in 1968 at the height of tensions between Burma and China and an escalating civil war between Burma's armed forces and the China-backed Burma Communist Party. In the same year, he and other veteran politicians among them U Nu and U Ba Swe were invited by General Ne Win to advise the Revolutionary Council on drafting a national constitution and "ways of improving the country's stability and prosperity." He was part of a group of twenty-one politicians who proposed the return to democracy with a mixed economy. A minority of eleven from a total of thirty-three members of the advisory committee recommended a one-party system. Ne Win rejected the majority advice. In 1974, Ne Win established a Soviet-style one-party socialist system based on a new constitution.

== Personal life ==
Kyaw Nyein met his future wife Daw Nwe Nwe Yee, a Burmese honor student, while teaching English as a tutor at the Rangoon University sometime in 1936 or 1937. They married in 1943 and had seven children, four boys and three girls.

He died in Rangoon after a long illness on 29 June 1986, aged 73.
