= Asian Socialist Conference =

Organization of socialist parties

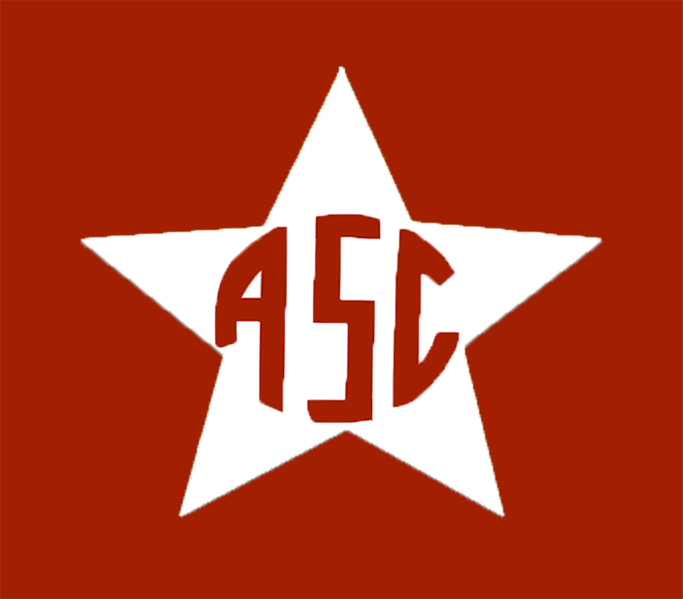
- Abbreviation: ASC
- Formation: 1953
- Dissolved: 1965
- Headquarters: 4, Wingaba Road, Rangoon, Socialist Burma until 1963; India until 1965
- Members: 500,000 (1956)
- Chairman: Ba Swe

The Asian Socialist Conference (ASC) was an organisation of socialist political parties in Asia that existed between 1953 and 1965. It was established in an effort to build a Pan-Asian multinational socialist organization, clearly independent from earlier European colonial centres, yet free from the new superpowers of the Cold War.

In total, four Asian Socialist Conferences convened: Rangoon, 1953 and 1954, and Bombay, 1956 and 1965. Until 1963 its headquarters was in Rangoon, Burma; the first chairman and treasurer of the conference were the Burmese socialist leaders Ba Swe and Kyaw Nyein, respectively. As of 1956, the member parties of ASC had a combined membership of about 500,000.

== Background ==
The Burma Socialist Party had expressed a wish for cooperation with other Asian socialists as early as 1946. At that time, the party was in the midst of the anti-colonial struggle and hoped for cooperation with other Asian socialists against a common enemy. On the occasion of the Asian Relations Conference, held in Delhi in 1947, leading members of the Socialist Parties of Burma, India and Indonesia, at an informal meeting, discussed the need and the possibility of the Socialist Parties of Asia meeting to discuss common problems and exchange experience. Subsequently, informal meetings between Burmese, Indian and Indonesian socialists were held in connection with the Asian Regional Conference of the International Labour Organization in Delhi in December 1951.

At Delhi, it was agreed on that a committee for the holding of an Asian Socialist Conference would be formed consisting of representatives of India, Burma, Indonesia, Malaya, Siam, Vietnam, Korea and the Philippines (the Japanese would be invited as observers). The proposed committee would have its headquarters in Rangoon. However, these plans did not materialise as agreed and it would take several years until such an organisation of Asian socialist parties would take form.

When the Socialist International was founded in 1951, some Asian socialists considered that the new organisation was too Eurocentric. Thus they felt that there was a need for an organised form of cooperation between Asian socialist parties. In September 1951, representatives of the Socialist Party of India (later the Praja Socialist Party) and the Japanese Socialist Party had a meeting in Tokyo. A joint statement was adopted, calling for a conference of Asian socialist parties. In December 1951, representatives of the Progressive Socialist Party of Lebanon met with the Socialist Party of India in Delhi and a joint manifesto calling for Asian socialist cooperation was adopted.

== Preparatory Committee ==
Following these meetings, the socialist parties of India, Burma and Indonesia met in Rangoon, Burma in March 1952 for a preparatory meeting. The Japanese Leftist and the Rightist socialist parties took part in the meetings as observers.

This meeting convened the Asian Socialist Conference, to be held in Rangoon in January 1953. The participants formed the 'Preparatory Committee for the first Conference of Asian Socialist Parties' headed by Kyaw Nyein. The Preparatory Committee began publishing Socialist Asia, which would later become the organ of the Asian Socialist Conference.

Invitations for the 1953 Rangoon conference were sent to Socialist Party of Indonesia, the Burma Socialist Party, the Praja Socialist Party (these were invited by default, as sponsors of the conference), both Japanese socialist parties, the Socialist Party of Egypt, the Iraqi National Democratic Party (which was not considered as a socialist party as such, but was seen as relatively close to socialist positions), the Arab Socialist Baath Party in Syria, the Lebanese Progressive Socialist Party, the Israeli Mapai, the Pan-Malayan Labour Party and the Pakistan Socialist Party. Observers were invited from African freedom movements from Algeria, Tunisia, Kenya, Uganda, Nigeria, Morocco, the Gold Coast as well as the Congress of Peoples against Imperialism. Invitations for fraternal organisations were sent to the Socialist International, the International Union of Socialist Youth and the League of Communists of Yugoslavia.

Despite its Asian focus, the organization still welcomed one European party, the League of Communists of Yugoslavia, which was perceived as unique case as the country never was a colonial power and since the 1948 Tito–Stalin split was also independent of the Soviet Union. Inclusion of Yugoslavia in the Conference was particularly promoted by Burma while Yugoslavia perceived its independent participation (as the only independent European delegation) as a recognition and honor which led to the opening of Yugoslav Embassy in Rangoon during the Conference. Yugoslavia of that day and age was perceived as a country that despite geography will fit well into the Third World initiatives while its World War II anti-imperial revolution was reminiscent of anti-colonial struggle.

== Rangoon conference ==
The Asian Socialist Conference was founded at a first conference held in Rangoon, Burma, January 6–15, 1953. The conference established the ASC as an independent socialist organisation, with headquarters in Rangoon. Ba Swe was elected Chairman of the ASC.

=== Participation ===
In total 177 delegates, observers and fraternal guests took part in the conference. The parties that took part as delegates were:

Country	Party	Number of delegates	Notable delegates
Burma	Burma Socialist Party	15	Ba Swe, Kyaw Nyein
Egypt	Socialist Party of Egypt	1	Ahmed Husayn
India	Praja Socialist Party	77	Ram Manohar Lohia, Jayaprakash Narayan, Asoka Mehta
Indonesia	Socialist Party of Indonesia	26	Sutan Sjahrir, Soebadio Sastrosatomo
Israel	Mapai		Moshe Sharett, Reuven Barkat
Japan	Leftist Socialist Party of Japan; Rightist Socialist Party of Japan	30	Suzuki Mosaburo; Komakichi Matsuoka
Lebanon	Progressive Socialist Party		
Malaya	Pan-Malayan Labour Party		
Pakistan	Pakistan Socialist Party		Mobarak Sagher

The fraternal guests and observers at the conference were:

- Socialist International: Clement Attlee (British Labour Party), Saul Rose (British Labour Party, Attlee's secretary), André Bidet (SFIO), Kaj Björk (Swedish Social Democratic Party)
- International Union of Socialist Youth: Donald Chesworth, William Worthy
- Congress of Peoples Against Imperialism: Margaret Pope
- League of Communists of Yugoslavia: Milovan Đilas, Aleš Bebler, Anton Blazevic
- Nepali Congress: Delegation led by B.P. Koirala
- Representatives of African freedom movements: Said Farni (Algerian People's Party), Ignatius Musazi (Kenya African Union), Taib Slim (Tunisian Destour Party), E. N. K. Mulira (Uganda National Congress)

=== Debates ===
All sessions of the conference were held in English, to the advantage of the Indian delegates but disadvantage for the Japanese, Indonesians and the Yugoslav delegation leader Đilas.

A proposal in formation of a 'Third Force' in world politics was raised at the conference (the conference would in many ways serve as a precursor of the 1955 Bandung Conference). The British SI representative Clement Attlee ridiculed the notion of building a third bloc outside the West-East contradiction. Milovan Đilas, B.P. Koirala and Jayaprakash Narayan intervened in favour of the Indian socialist leader Ram Manohar Lohia's proposal for a 'Third Force'. In the end, the conference adopted a resolution calling for support of democracy, condemning capitalism, communism and imperialism.

During his stay in Rangoon, Đilas gave an interview to the Yugoslav party organ Borba, stating that "[t]he Conference has revealed that in Asia, especially in India, Burma and Indonesia, there are very significant combat forces, able to fight not only against the old colonialism but also against Cominformism and the Soviet and Chinese hegemony... [These nations] have unmasked the anti-Socialist soul of the Soviet Union and its satellites."

=== Relation with the Socialist International ===
Even before the holding of the conference, the main organisers had agreed that the new organisation would exist separately from the Socialist International. However, at the Rangoon conference the SI delegation and its leader Attlee tried to convince the conference that the ASC would be a regional organisation of the SI. During the conference, Asian delegates criticised the stance of SI towards anti-colonial liberation movements.

Three delegations (Israelis, Malayans and Japanese Rightists) supported the proposal to merge ASC into the SI fold. The Israeli and Malayan parties were both SI members. Other delegations at Rangoon opposed the proposal (albeit in varying degrees). Opposition towards the SI was mainly expressed on issues relating to colonialism (the lukewarm attitudes of the SI towards anti-colonial liberation movements was criticised by delegates at the conference) and neutralism (at the conference, the SI was labelled as being part of the American camp). However, the way that the conference identified socialism was in terms similar to those the Socialist International used at the time.

== Interlude ==
=== Rangoon Bureau meeting ===
Between the first and second ASC conferences, the Bureau of the ASC met five times. The first Bureau meeting was held just after the first conference, in Rangoon on January 15, 1953. The Rangoon Bureau meeting appointed a Secretariat, which was to run the day-to-day affairs of the ASC at its Rangoon office. The post of general secretary was earmarked for the Indonesian party, which was to name their appointee at a later stage. Two joint secretaries were appointed, Madhu Limaye from India and Hla Aung from Burma. The Burmese Kyaw Nyein was selected as the Treasurer of ASC, a difficult task considering the underfunding of the Rangoon office. Limaye arrived at the office in March 1953.

In July 1953, ASC sent a four-member delegation to the congress of the Socialist International in Stockholm. The delegation was led by the Indonesian ASC general secretary Wijono. The ASC delegation suggested to the SI to commemorate a 'Dependent Peoples' Freedom Day', a proposal not well received by the SI congress.

=== Hyderabad Bureau meeting ===
On August 10–13, 1953, the Bureau held its second meeting in Hyderabad. The meeting was held in the Hill Fort Palace and was chaired by Ba Swe.

This was the first Bureau meeting which Wijono took part in. Another notable participant was the Lebanese PSP leader Kamal Jumblatt. The meeting adopted resolutions on topics 'On Peace Settlements' (supporting the admission of the People's Republic of China into the United Nations, calling for elections to a constituent assembly under international supervision in Indochina, calling for reunification of Korea under an international authority acceptable to both sides), 'K.M.T. troops in Burma' (calling for their removal from Burma) and 'Greetings to West Asian Socialists' (condemning repression against socialists in Syria). The meeting expressed its hope in continued cordial relations with the Socialist International and the League of Communists of Yugoslavia. These two organisations had observers present at the meeting, Morgan Phillips from the SI and Dobrivoje Vidić from the Yugoslav party.

The Hyderabad meeting decided to set up an 'Anti-Colonial Bureau', to be led by a Co-ordination Committee, which would be appointed by the ASC chairman. An office would be set up, served by one of the ASC Joint Secretaries and another Joint Secretary selected by the Co-ordinating Committee. Some suggestions for future tasks for the Anti-Colonial Bureau raised in Hyderabad included encouraging the holding of an all-African congress, calling for Asian and African governments to strengthen their work in the UN, calling of Asian newspapers to give more coverage and support to anti-colonial movements, sending a representative to the UN to help anti-colonial movements, urging that the Anti-Colonial Bureau should apply to become a consultative organisation in the UN, organising a fact-finding mission to colonial possessions in Asia, collecting funds for the defence of victims of colonial repression in Africa and elsewhere, and calling on Asian parties to arrange internships for African representatives.

Moreover, the Hyderabad meeting called for the creation of a joint construction brigade of the ASC. The Israeli and Burmese parties were put in charge of elaborating a proposal for such a brigade.

Limaye did not return to the Secretariat after the Hyderabad meeting. He was replaced by another Indian socialist, Madhav Gokhale. The Rangoon Secretariat was joined by one of the secretaries of the Anti-Colonial Bureau, Jim Markham of the Convention People's Party of the Gold Coast. In December 1953 Roo Watanbe, a Japanese Joint Secretary, arrived in Rangoon. The two Japanese parties had debated for a long time before being able to agree on a common candidate for ASC Joint Secretary.

=== Kalaw Bureau meeting ===
The third meeting of the ASC Bureau was supposed to have been held in Indonesia in April 1954. However, the Indonesian government refused to allow the entry of the Israeli delegation and the meeting was postponed and its venue shifted to Burma. The Bureau met in Kalaw May 25–28, 1954.

The Kalaw meeting adopted three resolutions, on Indochina, Korea and disarmament. At the meeting the Indian party had proposed a resolution condemning the formation of SEATO and calling for the formation of an Asian security alliance independent from the two superpowers, but this proposal was referred to the ASC parties rather than being adopted by the Bureau. A delegation of the Vietnam Socialist Party assisted the meeting. The delegation was led by Dr. Pham Van Ngoi. The Vietnam Socialist Party applied for ASC membership at the meeting, but the Bureau decided to wait with taking a decision on the application until a factfinding mission had been sent to Indochina and Malaya. The Kalaw meeting also decided to send a factfinding mission to Ceylon.

The factfinding mission to Malaya and South Vietnam was carried out July–August 1954. The delegation consisted of Wijono, Watanbe and Markham. Their report gave a favourable view on the Vietnam Socialist Party, whilst expressing sharp criticisms against the Labour Party of Malaya. Gokhale went on a one-man factfinding mission to Ceylon. His report suggested that ASC membership be given to the Lanka Sama Samaja Party.

=== Tokyo Bureau meeting ===
The fourth ASC Bureau meeting was held in Tokyo November 19–21, 1954. The meeting was preceded by the first meeting of the ASC Economic Experts' Committee. Regarding the reports of the factfinding missions, the Bureau meeting decided to suggest the next Conference to approve membership for the Vietnam Socialist Party. Regarding the Ceylonese LSSP, the meeting suggested that LSSP be give a special invitee status provided that the LSSP break its relations to the Trotskyist Fourth International. At the Tokyo meeting the LSSP leader Colvin R. de Silva participated. The LSSP could not accept the condition to break its affiliation to the Fourth International, and thus declined the proposal from ASC. After this break, the ASC began considering links with the Sri Lanka Freedom Party instead.

== Anti-Colonial Bureau ==
The Hyderabad Bureau meeting had given the ASC chairman the task of appointing the Co-ordination Committee of the Anti-Colonial Bureau. Ba Swe proposed the formation of a Committee with five representatives from the ASC parties and four representatives from African freedom movements. But problems in finding an adequate composition arose immediately, as the Moroccan appointee refused to sit in the same committee as a representative of the Israeli party.

The Co-ordination Committee of the Anti-Colonial Bureau met for the first time in connection with the Kalaw ASC Bureau meeting in May 1954. Kyaw Nyein was elected Chairman of the Anti-Colonial Bureau.

== Bombay conference ==
The second, and last, Asian Socialist Conference was held at K.C. College, Bombay, India, in November 1956. The Asian delegations at the Bombay conference were more or less the same as the 1953 Rangoon conference, but three new parties joined the ASC as members. They were the Vietnam Socialist Party, the Sri Lanka Freedom Party and the Nepali Congress. Non-Asian guests taking part in the conference came from the Italian Socialist Party, the Canadian Co-operative Commonwealth Federation, the Popular Socialist Party of Chile, a Greek socialist party, the League of Communists of Yugoslavia, the Movement for the Liberation of Colonies, the African Freedom Committee and representatives from Algeria, Kenya and Tanganyika.

The debates at the Bombay conference were dominated by the Suez Crisis. The conference condemned the Anglo-French aggression against Egypt. Another resolutions called for Soviet withdrawal from Hungary, recognition of the People's Republic of China in the United Nations, and reunification in Vietnam and Korea.

== Israeli participation ==
In the case of Israel, Mapai was invited to the 1953 Rangoon conference rather than the more leftist Mapam. At the time, Mapam was considered as too close to the communists.

The Israeli presence at the Rangoon conference provoked confrontations with Arab delegates. In the beginning of the conference the Egyptian delegate refused to sit at the same table as the Israeli delegation, and left the conference in protest. The Lebanese delegation also left the conference in protest of the Israeli participation. Notably, whilst not joining the Egyptian and Lebanese walk-out, the Pakistani party retained reservations about the role of the Israeli delegation.

At the same time, the ASC provided a space for Mapai (which was the governing party in Israel) to foster relations with Asian socialists, contacts that were later to be translated into strengthening of bilateral diplomatic links with states such as Burma and Nepal. The Rangoon conference was probably the first time that Nepali Congress leaders met with Israelis. The fact that Nepalese and Burmese socialists could identify with the socialist profile of Mapai contributed to the shaping of close linkages. In the case of Nepal, these links were maintained even after the Nepali Congress had been dislodged by the royal coup in 1960. In the case of Burma, the meetings at the Rangoon conference led to the opening of diplomatic links and, soon afterwards, the first appointment of an Israeli ambassador (David Hacohen) to an Asian country.

With Israel's role in the Tripartite attack on Egypt in 1956, relations between Mapai and socialist parties in Asia deteriorated. The Japanese Socialist Party socialists saw the Israeli attack and the occupation of Egyptian territory and Gaza as foreign domination, intended to safeguard colonial control over Egypt. In January 1957 the JSP adopted the 'Fukuoka Resolution', which called for the expulsion of Mapai from the Asian Socialist Conference and the Socialist International. In the end, Israeli diplomats were able to persuade the JSP not to present the Fukuoka Resolution to the ASC and SI.

== Dissolution ==
As of 1961, the ASC was no longer functioning. Factors contributing to the non-continuation of the ASC experience were the suppressions of socialist parties in Burma, Indonesia and Nepal, as well as the factional disputes which weakened the socialist movement in India.

In 1970 the Asia-Pacific Socialist Bureau was formed as a successor organisation of the ASC. The Bureau, a committee of the Socialist International, had a different regional focus than the ASC, though. The Asia-Pacific Socialist Bureau was based in Wellington, New Zealand, and included the Australian and New Zealand Labour parties.

== See also ==
- Pan-Pacific Trade Union Secretariat
- Politics of Asia
