= Arakan Division =

1862–1974 British then Burmese territory

- Division of Burma Province (1862-1937) Division of Colony of Burma (1937-1948) Division of Union of Burma (1948-1974)
- 1862–1974
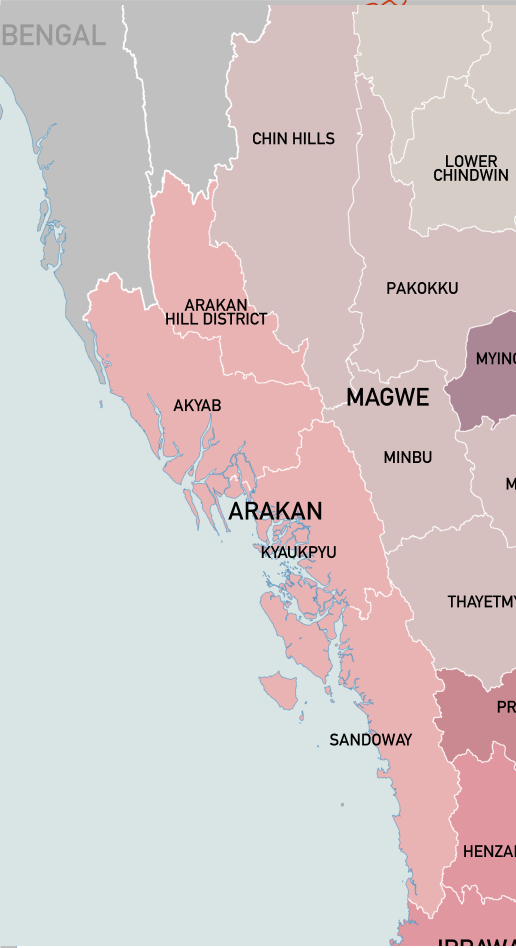
- Arakan Division and its four districts
- Capital: Akyab
- Historical era: Colonial era
  - Treaty of Yandabo: 24 February 1826
  - Separation from British India: 1937
  - Japanese occupation: 1942–1945
  - Independence of the Union of Burma: 4 January 1948
Preceded by
Burma Division
Konbaung Dynasty
State of Burma
Succeeded by
State of Burma
Chin Special Division
Arakan State

Arakan Division (Burmese: ရခိုင်တိုင်း) was an administrative division of the British Empire, covering modern-day Rakhine State, Myanmar, which was the historical region of Arakan. It bordered the Bengal Presidency of British India to the north. The Bay of Bengal was located on its western coastline. Arakan Division had a multiethnic population. It was a leading rice exporter.

== History ==
Arakan was ceded to the East India Company's administration by the Treaty of Yandabo signed after the First Anglo-Burmese War in 1826. The area was initially governed as part of the Bengal Presidency. It later became part of the Burma Province. In 1937, Burma became a separate crown colony. During World War II, Arakan fell to the Japanese occupation of Burma in 1942. The Burma Campaign involved several Arakanese campaigns, including the Arakan Campaign 1942-1943. The division was regained by British forces, with help from the Allies, in 1945. Arakan continued to be a division of Burma after its independence from Britain in 1948.

== Geography ==
The division was a coastal strip of land running along the eastern seaboard of the Bay of Bengal, from the Naf River estuary, on the borders of Chittagong, to Cape Negrais. Length from northern extremity to Cape Negrais, about 400 m; greatest breadth in the northern part, 90 m, gradually diminishing towards the south, as it is hemmed in by the Arakan Mountains, until, in the extreme south, it tapers away to a narrow strip not more than 15 m across. The coast was studded with islands, the most important of which are Cheduba, Ramree and Shahpura. The division had its headquarters at Akyab (Sittwe) and consists of four districts—namely, Akyab, Northern Arakan Hill Tracts, Sandoway and Kyaukpyu, formerly called Ramree. Its area is 18,540 sq. m. The population at the time of the British occupation in 1826 did not exceed 100,000. In 1831 it amounted to 173,000; in 1839 to 248,000, and in 1901 to 762,102.

The principal rivers of Arakan Division included the Naaf estuary, in the north, which forms the boundary between the division and Chittagong; (2) the Mayu River, an arm of the sea, running a course almost parallel with the coast for about 50 m.; (3) the Kaladan River, rising near the Blue mountain, in the extreme north-east, and falling into the Bay of Bengal a few miles south of the Mayu River, navigable by vessels of from 300 to 400 tons burden for a distance of 40 m. inland; and (4) the Lemro River, a considerable stream falling into the bay a few miles south of the Kaladan. Farther to the south, owing to the nearness of the range which bounds Arakan on the east, the rivers are of but little importance. These are the Talak and the Aeng, navigable by boats; and the Sandoway, the Taungup and the Gwa streams, the latter of which alone has any importance, owing to its mouth forming a good port of call or haven for vessels of from 9 to 10 ft. draught. There are several passes over the Arakan Mountains, the easiest being that called the Aeng route, leading from the village of that name into Upper Burma. The staple crop of the division was rice, along with cotton, tobacco, sugar, hemp and indigo. The forests produce abundance of excellent oak and teak timber.

The Northern Arakan Hill Tracts district is under a superintendent, who was usually a member of the Imperial Police, with headquarters at Paletwa. The area of the Hill Tracts was 5233 sq. m.; pop. (1901) 20,682.

== Districts ==
Arakan had four districts which are listed in the following:

1. Akyab
2. Arakan Hill Tracts
3. Kyaukpyu
4. Sandoway

== Demographics ==
The Burmese-origin Arakanese people were the majority of the province. The Burman Arakanese were mainly Buddhist. The second largest community were Arakanese Indians, of whom the predominant majority were Muslim; and a minority were Hindu. Like the rest of Burma, the Burman Arakanese were concentrated in villages and tribal shifting cultivation zones; while Indians dominated urban areas. Arakan had the largest percentage of Indians in Burma. The 1931 census found 500,000 Indians living in the divisional capital Akyab, where they dominated the seaport and its hinterland.

== Legislatures ==
Arakan Division was represented in the Legislative Council of Burma between 1897 and 1937. It was also represented in the Imperial Legislative Council. After the Government of Burma Act, 1935 separated Burma from India, the Legislature of Burma served as the legislative body of the colony, including Arakan Division. Elections were held in 1920, 1922, 1923, 1925, 1926, 1928, 1930, 1932, 1934, 1936 and 1947.

Both Burmese-Arakanese and Indo-Arakanese were elected as native members to the Legislature of Burma. Gani Markan was a native Indian legislator from Arakan. In 1947, the legislature transformed into a constituent assembly. Two Arakanese Indians were elected under the Burmese native category to the constituent assembly, including M. A. Gaffar and Sultan Ahmed. The constituent assembly became the legislative body of the independent Union of Burma on 4 January 1948.

== Economy ==
Wages in Arakan were much higher than in British India. The division was notable for its rice production. Akyab became one of the leading rice exporting ports in the world, hosting ship fleets from Europe and China. As Arakan was mostly accessible by sea, its ports depended on ferry and cargo shipping with Chittagong, Narayanganj, Dacca, Calcutta, Moulmein, Rangoon, Singapore, Penang, Madras and Syriam. Arakan was also notable for its timber.
