= Maung Gyi (disambiguation) =

Maung Gyi is a Burmese martial artist who introduced Bando into the U.S.

Maung Gyi may also refer to:

- Maung Gyee, Burmese politician and diplomat
- Maung Maung Gyi, Burmese watercolor painter
- Joseph Augustus Maung Gyi, acting Governor of British Burma in 1930–1931
- Ledi Pandita U Maung Gyi, Burmese writer
