= Burma for the Burmans League =

The Burma for the Burmans League was a political alliance in Burma.

== History ==
The alliance was formed in August 1928 by opposition parties in the Legislative Council and was largely made up of members of the People's Party and the Karen National Association. However, it had little widespread support and was effectively only a label for the opposition parties.

Prior to the 1932 general elections it formed the basis of the Separation League alliance, which supported separation from India.
