= People's Party (Burma) =

Defunct Burmese political party

The People's Party (Burmese: ပြည်သူပြည်သားပါတီ) was a political party in Burma.

== History ==
The party was formed by a merger of the Nationalist Party, the Home Rule Party and the Swaraj Party in 1926, with the three parties having won a combined 45 seats in the 1925 elections. However, by 1928 it had been reduced to 35 seats. Campaigning under the slogan "Burma for the Burmans", it continued with the platform of the Nationalist Party and the General Council of Burmese Associations.

The 1928 elections saw the party win 40 seats, slightly down from the 45 won by the three parties in 1925. Although it was the largest party, and its ally the National Parliamentary Organisation (NPO) held another five seats, the Independent Party was able to form a government with the assistance of the ethnic members and members appointed by the Governor.

Following the elections, the NPO merged into the People's Party. However, in the build-up to the 1932 elections the party began to disintegrate over the issue of separation from India; members in favour (largely former Nationalist Party members) left to join the Separation League whilst most of the others joined the Anti-Separation League.
