= List of ambassadors of Myanmar to the United Kingdom =

Ambassador of Myanmar to the United Kingdom
- Incumbent; Kyaw Zwar Minn (Disputed) since October 28, 2013
- Inaugural holder: Joseph Augustus Maung Gyi
- Formation: January 1, 1948

The Myanmar Ambassador in London is the official representative of the Government in Naypyidaw to the Governments of the United Kingdom and Sweden.

The current Myanmar Ambassador to the U.K. is Kyaw Zwar Minn.

Although, the Burmese military claims that his position as Ambassador has been terminated, Burma's Foreign Affairs ministry indicated that he has not been recalled as Ambassador to the U.K.

== History ==
- Since 1989 Union of Myanmar

== List of representatives ==
Diplomatic accreditation	Ambassador	Observations	List of presidents of Myanmar	List of prime ministers of the United Kingdom	Term end
January 1, 1948	Sir Maung Gyee		Sao Shwe Thaik	Winston Churchill	November 6, 1948
April 26, 1949	Ohn (Burmese diplomat)	He was the first Ambassador to Moscow, later Advisor to the Prime Minister.	Sao Shwe Thaik	Winston Churchill	
October 23, 1951	Ka Si		Sao Shwe Thaik	Winston Churchill	
January 1, 1955	Sao Boonwaat	Chargé d'affaires( 1919 1991) First Secretary. Sao Bunvadvongsa/Sao Boonwaat (* Mar 31, 1919) Ed. Univ. of Rangoon (B.A., Econ.)	Ba U	Anthony Eden	
May 21, 1955	U Kyin	Maung Kyin: From 1953 to 1955 he was Burmese Ambassador to India.; Sithu U Aung Soe, a former member of the Indian Civil Service	Ba U	Anthony Eden	1956
November 1, 1956	Aung Soe (Burmese diplomat)		Ba U	Anthony Eden	
March 29, 1961	Hla Maung		Win Maung	Harold Macmillan	
June 1, 1968	Ba Saw		Ne Win	Harold Wilson	
March 11, 1971	Chit Myaing		Ne Win	Edward Heath	
May 10, 1978	Kyi Maung		Ne Win	James Callaghan	
December 4, 1981	Myo Aung		San Yu	Margaret Thatcher	1985
July 16, 1985	Tin Tun (Burmese diplomat)		San Yu	Margaret Thatcher	
June 15, 1989	Tin Hlaing (Burmese diplomat)		Saw Maung	Margaret Thatcher	
October 1, 1996	Win Aung		Than Shwe	John Major	
June 3, 1999	Kyaw Win (Burmese diplomat)	From 1995 to 1999 he was Myanmar Ambassador to Canada.	Than Shwe	Tony Blair	
July 1, 2005	U Nay Win		Than Shwe	Tony Blair	
January 1, 2006	Than Htike	Chargé d'affaires	Than Shwe	Tony Blair	
October 28, 2013	Kyaw Zwar Minn	Kyaw Swa Min: In 2017 he became Myanmar's Ambassador to Austria.; Disputed as of 8 April. Deputy ambassador Chit Win has seemingly taken over as chargé d'affaires, but has not passed his credentials to the British Foreign Office.	Thein Sein	David Cameron	
