= British Indian passport =

Former travel document issued to subjects of the British Indian Empire

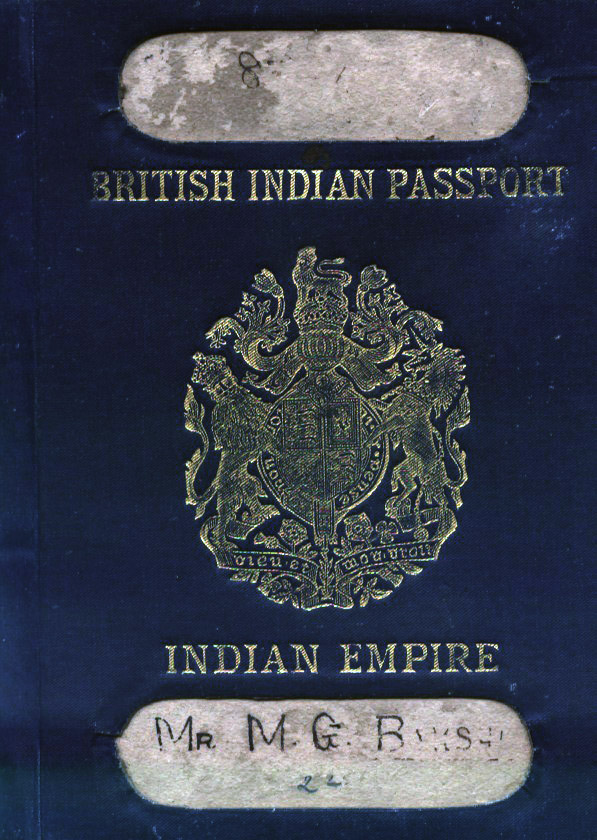
- The front cover of a British Indian passport.
- Type: Passport
- Issued by: (British Raj) Indian Empire
- Purpose: Identification

The British Indian passport was a passport, proof of national status and travel document issued to British subjects of British India (officially mentioned as the Indian Empire), British subjects from other parts of the British Empire, and the subjects of the British protected states in the Indian subcontinent (i. e. the British Protected Persons of the 'princely states'). The title of the state stamped on the outside cover but not inside the passport was the "Indian Empire", which covered all of India, Pakistan, Bangladesh, and Myanmar (Burma).

The use of the passport was discontinued after the independence of India and Pakistan in 1947, and its bearers were entitled to opt for Indian, Pakistani or British nationality.

== History ==
The use of passports was introduced to British India after the First World War.

The Indian Passport Act of 1920 required the use of passports, established controls on the foreign travel of Indians, and foreigners travelling to and within the provinces of India. The passport was based on the format agreed upon by the 1920 League of Nations International Conference on Passports.

However, the British Indian passport had very limited usage, being valid for travel only within areas governed by the British Empire, Italian Empire, Switzerland, Austria, Czechoslovakia, Germany, Spain, Norway, Sweden and Dutch Empire.

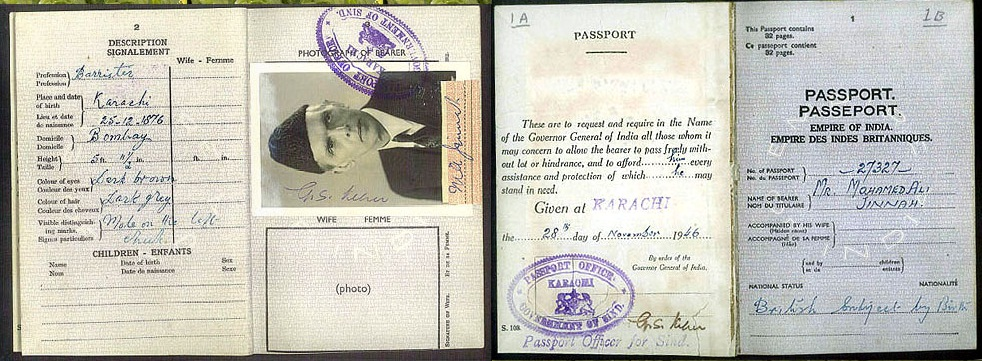
Muhammad Ali Jinnah's passport issued by the Indian government.

== Issuance ==
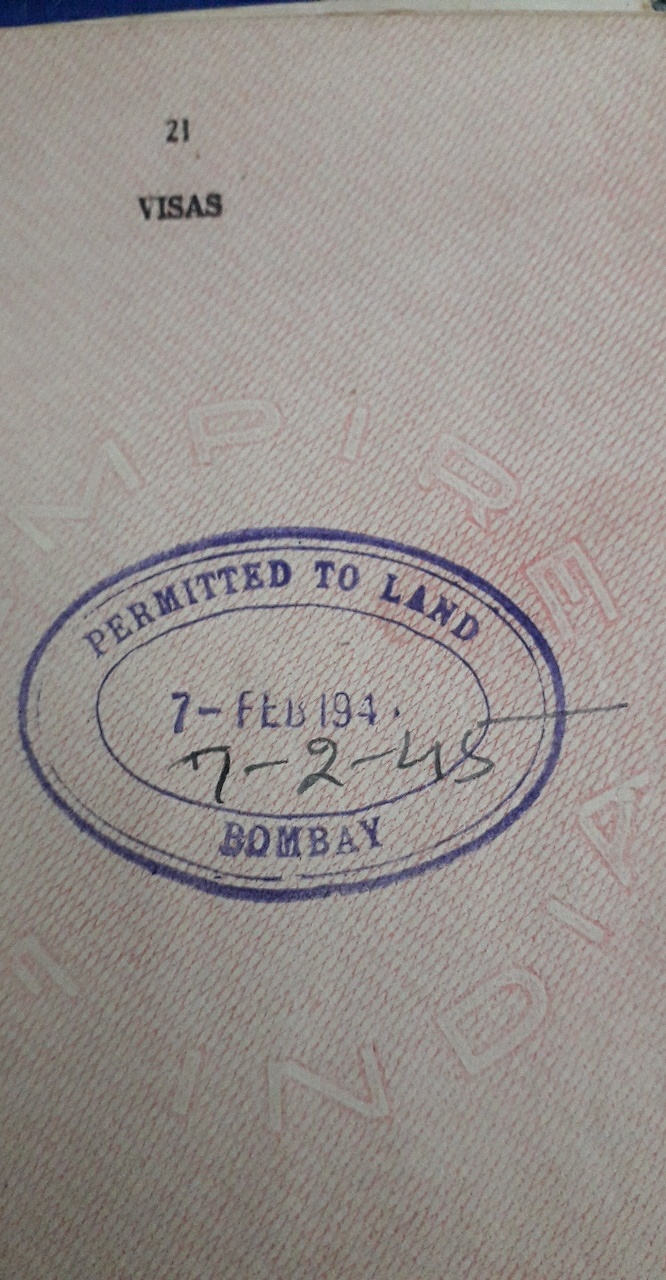
A stamp on a British Indian Passport.

A British Indian passport could be issued to persons who were British subjects by birth, naturalisation, a British protected person or the spouse or widow of such persons. The passports were issued by the passport offices run by provincial governments and were valid for five years after issue. In 1922, applicants were charged INR 1 to receive a new passport. The price was raised to INR 3 by 1933.

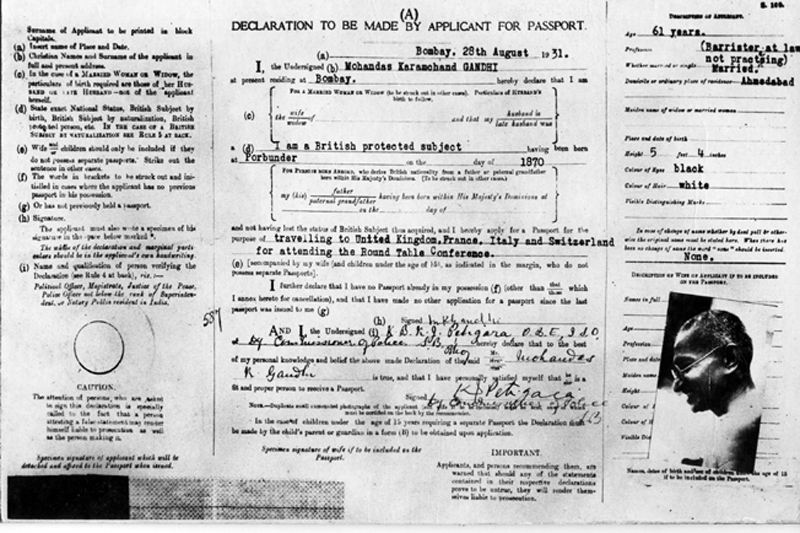
1931 passport application, by Mohandas Karamchand Gandhi

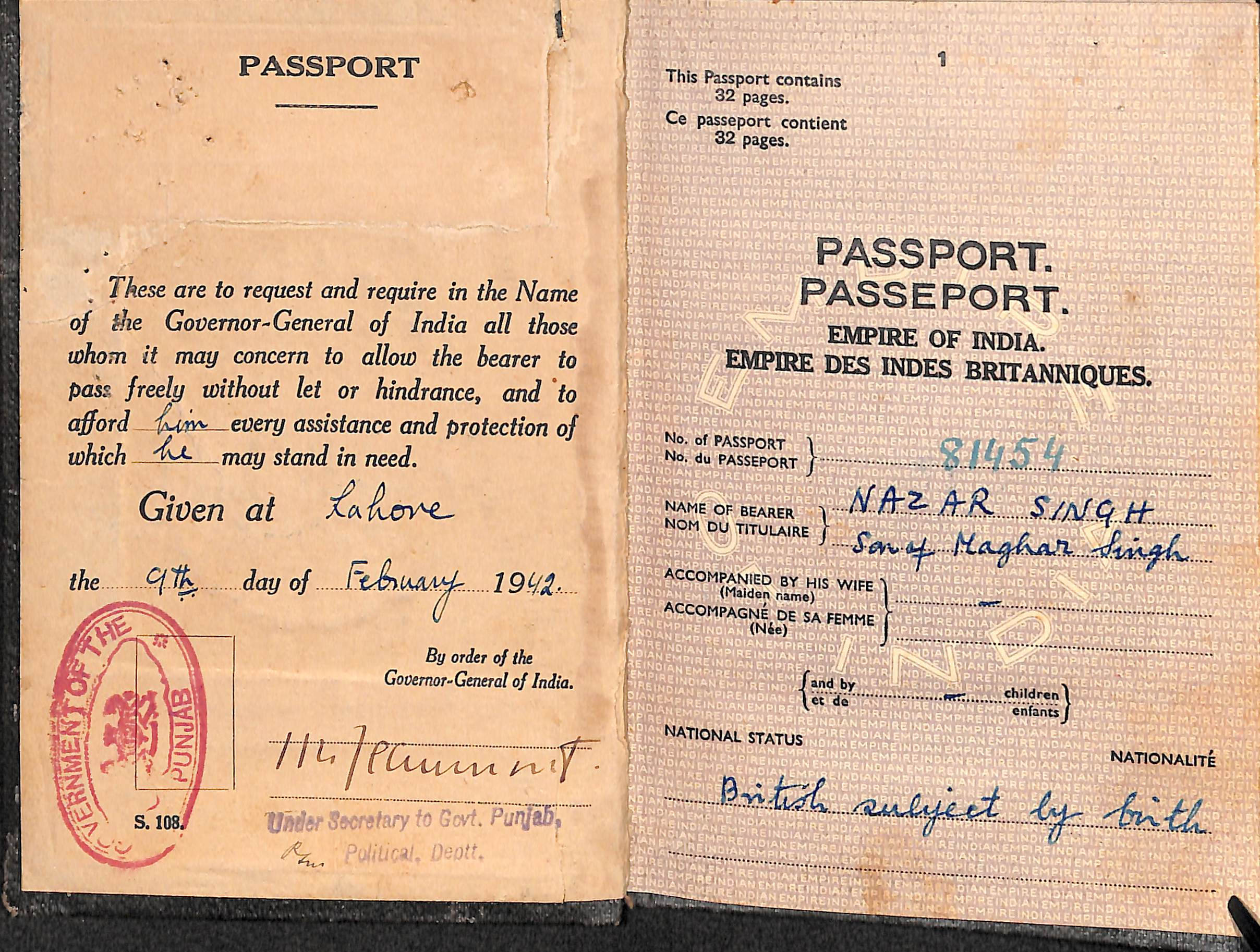
The first page of a British Indian passport belonging to a person named Nazar Singh.

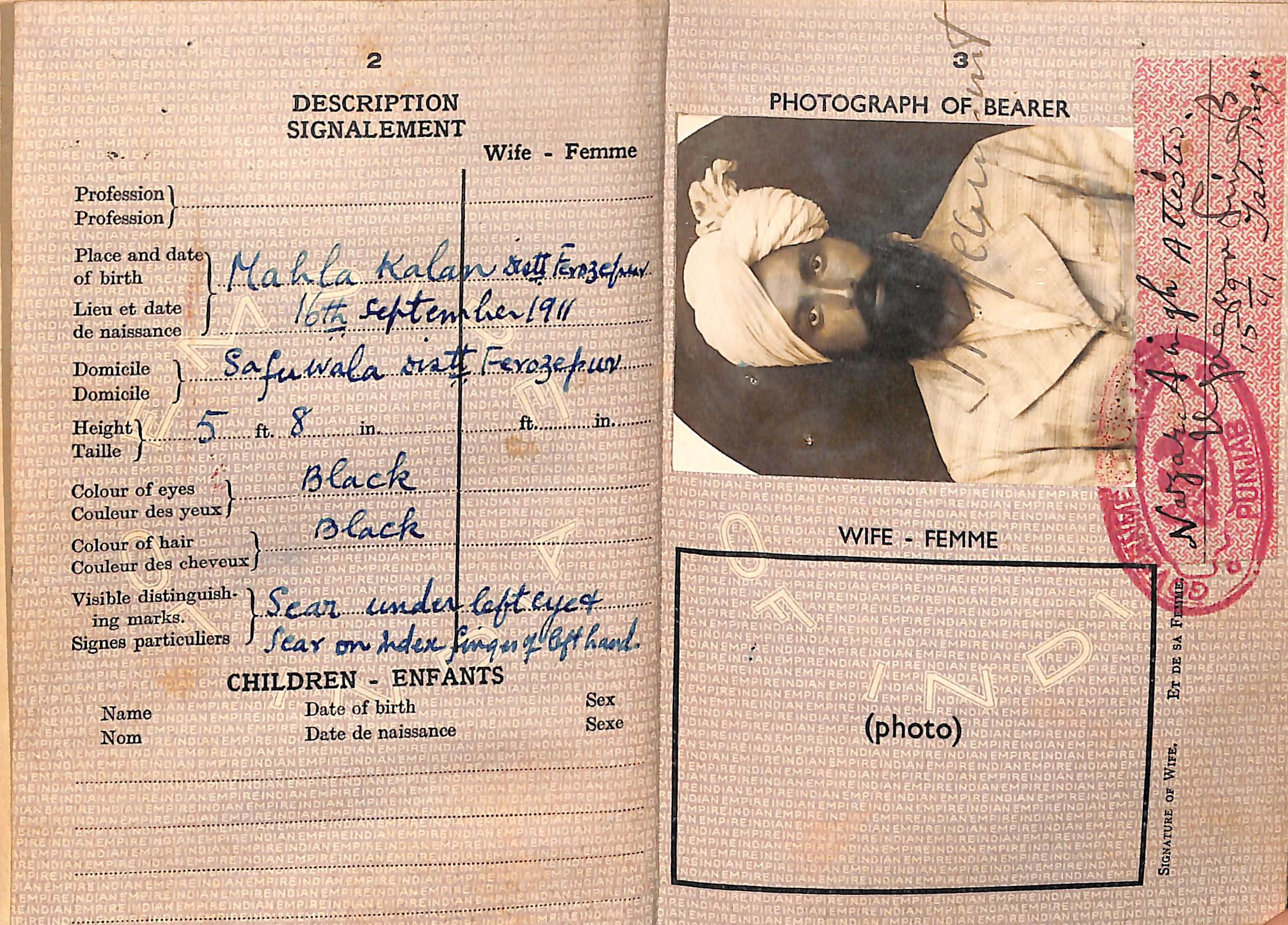
Second page of Nazar Singh's British Indian passport

== Physical appearance ==
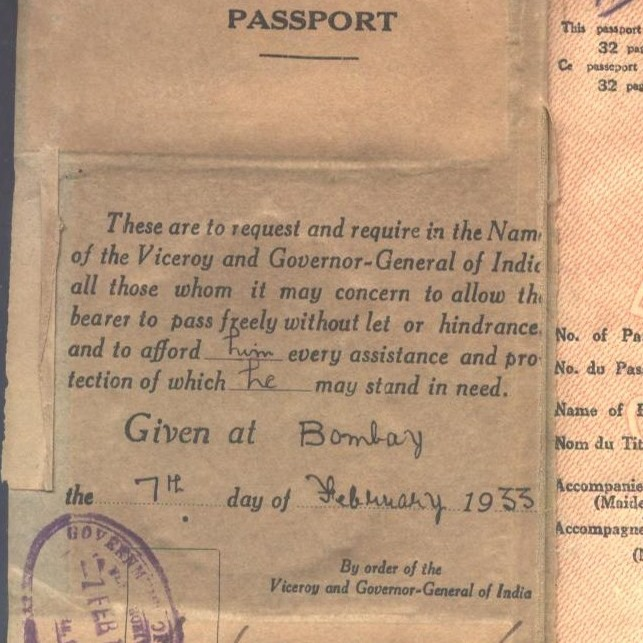
Official note from the Viceroy of India on the first page of the British Indian passport.

The cover of passport was of navy blue colour with the emblem of the British Empire (i.e. the Royal Arms of the United Kingdom) emblazoned on the front cover. The word "British Indian Passport" was printed above the emblem and "Indian Empire" printed below. The text of the passport was printed in English and French. Other details were hand-written.

=== Bearer details ===
The passport includes the following details describing the bearer:

- Passport number
- Name of bearer
- Place of issue
- Date of issue
- Accompanied by [wife, children]
- National status - British subject by [birth or naturalisation]
- Profession
- Place and date of birth
- Domicile
- Height
- Eye colour
- Hair colour
- Distinguishing features
- Validity and expiry dates

The passports also included the photographs of the bearer and accompanying spouse. Latter half of the passport book was allocated for the visa and port of entry and departure stamps.

=== Passport note ===
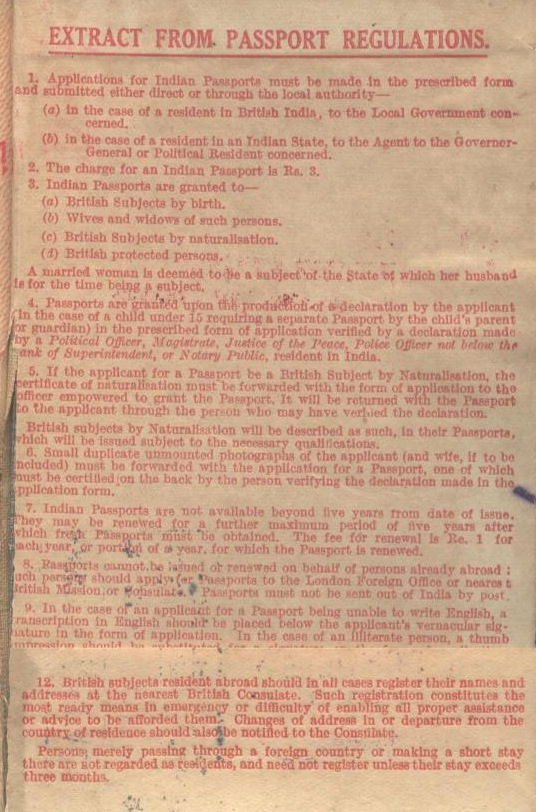
Last page of the passport describing the rules and regulations

The passport contains a note from the Governor General that is addressed to the authorities of all other states, identifying the bearer as a citizen of that state and requesting that he or she be allowed to pass and be treated according to international norms. The note inside of Indian Passports states:

These are to request and require in the name of the Viceroy and Governor-General of India all those whom it may concern to allow the bearer to pass freely without let or hindrance, and to afford him every assistance and protection of which he or she may stand in need.

By the order of the Viceroy and Governor-General of India.

The note bearing page is stamped and signed by the issuing passport officer with the provincial government of the place of issue.

== See also ==
- Bangladeshi passport
- British passport
- Indian passport
- Myanmar passport
- Pakistani passport
- Bangladeshi nationality law
- British nationality law
- Indian nationality law
- Myanmar nationality law
- Pakistani nationality law
