= Karen National Association =

The Karen National Association (Burmese: ကရင်အမျိုးသားအသင်း; KNA) was a political party in Burma.

== History ==
The KNA was established in 1881, the first modern political party in the country. It represented the Christian Karen and Sgaw communities, replacing the American Baptist missionaries as the main voice of the Karens to the colonial government.

The party joined the Burma for the Burmans League in the late 1920s, and was a member of the Separation League for the 1932 general elections. It was disbanded during World War II.
