= M. A. Gaffar =

Burmese politician (1910–1966)

M. A. Gaffar MP
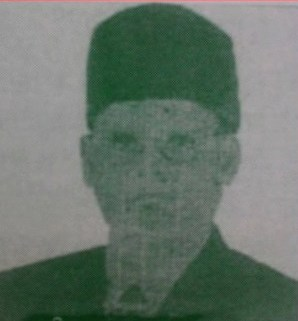

Member of the Constituent Assembly of Burma
- In office 1947–1948
- Governor: Hubert Rance
- Constituency: Buthidaung

Member of the Chamber of Nationalities
- In office 1952–1956
- President: Ba U
- Constituency: Akyab

Member of the Chamber of Nationalities
- In office 1956–1962
- President: Ba U Win Maung
- Constituency: Maungdaw

Parliamentary Secretary to the Ministry of Health

Personal details
- Born: 1910 Buthidaung, Arakan Division, Burma Province, British Raj (now in Myanmar)
- Died: 1966 (aged 55–56)
- Party: Jamiat-e-Ulema
- Other political affiliations: Anti-Fascist People's Freedom League
- Education: University of Dhaka; Aligarh Muslim University

Mohammed Abdul Gaffar (1910–1966), also known as Abdul Gaffar, was a politician from Arakan, Burma (now Rakhine State, Myanmar). He was elected to the Legislature of Burma in British Burma from Buthidaung in 1947. After Burmese independence in 1948, the President of Burma Sao Shwe Thaik appointed Gaffar as one of the seven members of the Inquiry Commission of Arakan in 1949. Gaffar was elected to the Chamber of Nationalities from Akyab West constituency in 1952. He was elected from Maungdaw in 1956. He also served as Parliamentary Secretary for the Ministry of Health in the government of Prime Minister U Nu.

Gaffar was a member of the Rohingya community of Arakan, a state with the largest percentage of Indians in Burma. In 1949, Gaffar presented a memorandum to the Regional Autonomy Enquiry Commission describing Arakanese Indians as the "Rohingya", based on the colloquial terms Rohang and Rohan, the local Indian names of the region.

== Early life ==
Gaffar was born in 1910 in the Rwanynotaung village of Buthidaung in Arakan Division, Burma Province, British India. His father was Ulah Meah. Gaffar attended the Chittagong Senior Madrasa in the Bengal Presidency, where he completed his secondary school studies in 1924. He completed a bachelor's degree from the University of Dacca in 1930 and a Bachelor of Education degree from Aligarh Muslim University in 1933. He served as a District Inspector of Schools (DIS) in Akyab from 1931 to 1942 and as a Township Officer (T.O) of Buthidaung from 1944 to 1945.

== Political career ==
During the 1947 Burmese general election, Gaffar was elected to the Burmese constituent assembly as a representative of the Buthidaung constituency. On 4 January 1948, he took oath as a legislator of the Union of Burma.

The first president of Burma appointed Gaffar as one of the seven members of the Inquiry Commission of Arakan in 1949. During the Burmese general election, 1951–52, he was elected to the Burmese upper house, the Chamber of Nationalities, as a representative of Akyab West. During the 1956 Burmese general election, he was elected to the chamber as a representative of Maungdaw and Buthidaung. Burma's first prime minister appointed Gaffar as parliamentary secretary to oversee the Ministry of Health.

== Memorandum of Appeal ==
On 20 November 1948, Gaffar presented a Memorandum of Appeal to the Principal Secretary of the Government of the Union of Burma asking for recognition of the Arakanese Indians as one of the "official nations" (ethnic groups) of Burma under the name Rohingya. The memorandum was published in the Guardian Daily, an English newspaper in Burma, on 20 August 1951.

We the Rohingyas of Arakan are a nation. We maintain and hold that Rohingyas and Arakanese are the two principal nations in Arakan. We are a nation of nearly 9 lakh, which is sufficient for the population of a nation; and what is more is that we are a nation according to any definition of a nation, with our own distinctive culture and civilization, language and literature, art and architecture, names and nomenclature, sense of value and proportion, legal laws and moral codes, customs and calendar, history and traditions, aptitude and ambitions; in short, we have our distinctive outlook on life and of life. By all canons of international law the Rohingyas are a nation in Arakan.

== Political legacy ==
Despite Gaffar's call for constitutional recognition of his community, and increased Rohingya political participation in the 1950s; the Indian minority in Arakan faced discrimination after the 1962 Burmese coup d'état. The 1982 Burmese nationality law rendered the community stateless, by failing to recognize the Rohingya as one of Burma's "national races". Rohingyas are restricted from state education, government jobs and freedom of movement in Myanmar, with the conditions being described as similar to apartheid.

== See also ==
- Burmese Muslims
