= Separation League =

Political alliance in Burma

- Ideology: Separation of Burma from India

The Separation League was a political alliance in Burma.

== History ==
The alliance was formed to contest the 1932 general elections by parties that were in favour of Burma being separated from British Raj, as the British government had indicated that it would take the outcome of the elections as an indication of Burmese opinion. In addition to separation, the League was in favour of restricting Indian immigration, banning monks from being involved in politics and banishing foreign money lenders.

The alliance's leadership was based around the Burma for the Burmans League, including the former Nationalist Party faction of the People's Party, as well as the Karen National Association. Poorly funded and lacking in widespread support, the alliance won 29 seats and was defeated by the Anti-Separation League, which won 42 seats.
