= Home Rule Act =

Home Rule Act may refer to:

- Government of Ireland Act 1914, sometimes called the "Third Home Rule Act"
- Government of Ireland Act 1920, sometimes called the "Fourth Home Rule Act"
- District of Columbia Home Rule Act, a 1973 act of the United States Congress
- 1979 Greenlandic home rule referendum, on greater autonomy from Denmark

== See also ==
- Home rule
- Home Rule Cities Act (Michigan)
- Home Rule Party (disambiguation)
