= Westminster Magistrates' Court =

Lower court in London, England

Coordinates: 51.5207°N 0.1644°W

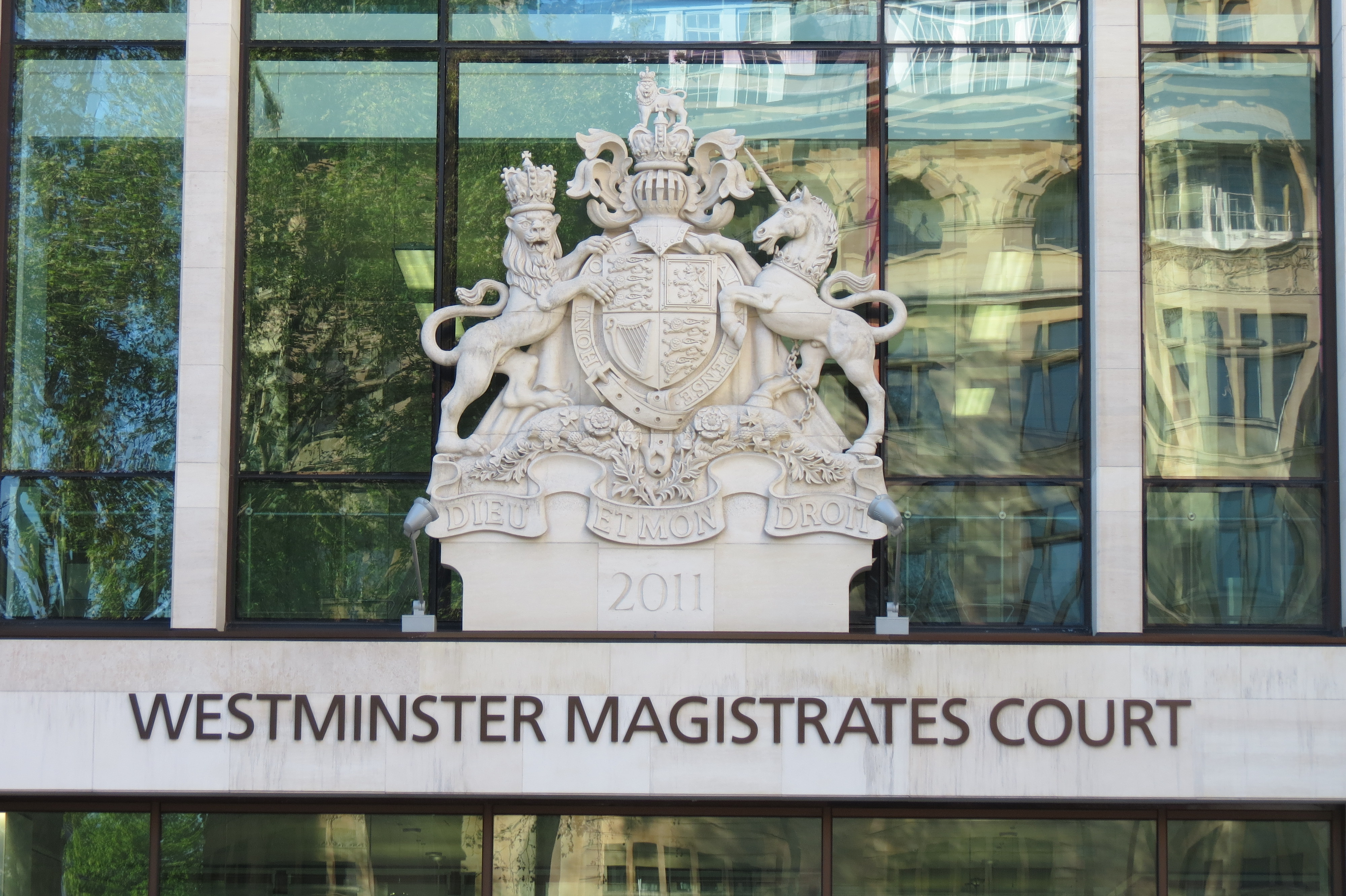
Coat of arms of Westminster Magistrates' Court, opened in 2011

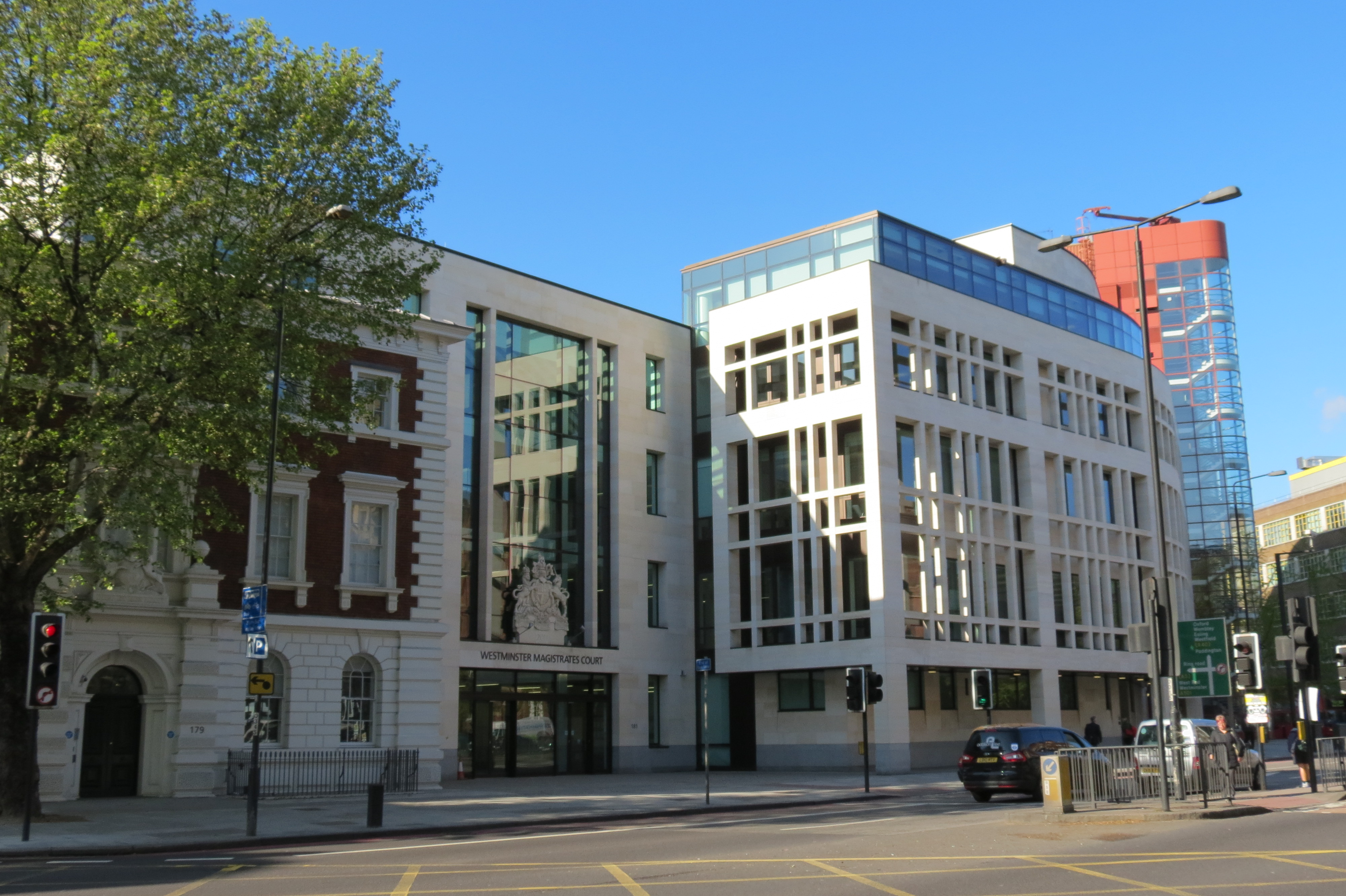
The new (2011) court building in Marylebone Road incorporates the façade of the old Marylebone Magistrates Court (left)

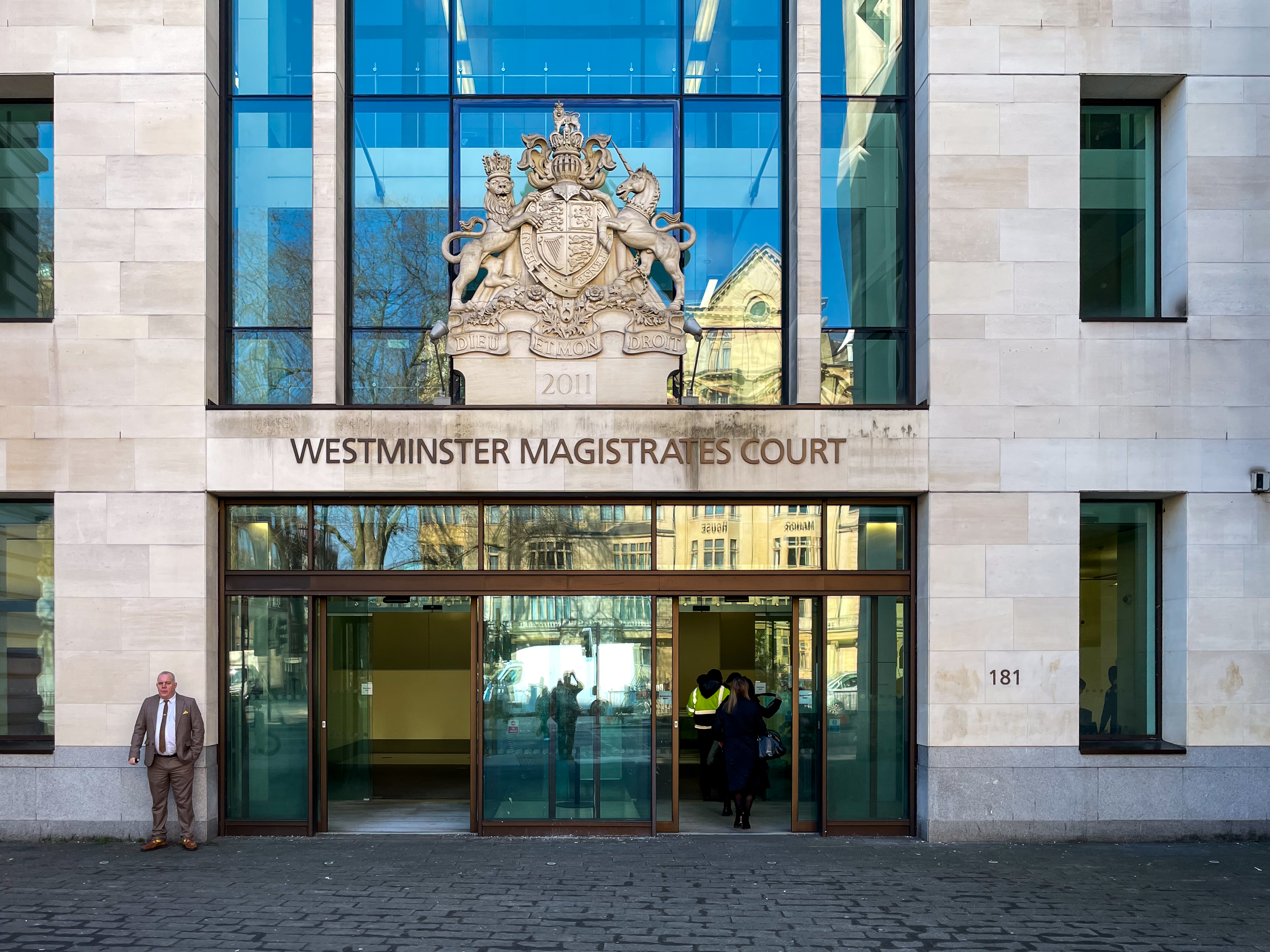
The entrance in 2025

Westminster Magistrates' Court is a magistrates' court at 181 Marylebone Road, London. The Chief Magistrate of England and Wales, who is the Senior District Judge of England and Wales, sits at the court, and all extradition and terrorism-related cases pass through it. The court opened on 22 September 2011 as a replacement for the City of Westminster Magistrates' Court.

== Notable cases ==
=== Mormon case ===
In February 2014 the court heard a case in which a former member of the Church of Jesus Christ of Latter-day Saints (LDS Church) launched a rare private prosecution in the court, which issued a summons to Thomas S. Monson (then leader of the LDS Church) to answer claims under the 2006 Fraud Act. A church spokesperson characterised the allegations as bizarre, later stating that Monson has no intention of appearing in person at the 14 March hearing. Experts consulted by the press found it highly unlikely that Monson would be extradited from the United States. A former crown prosecutor stated: "I think the British courts will recoil in horror. This is just using the law to make a show, an anti-Mormon point. And I'm frankly shocked that a magistrate has issued it." The person lodging the complaint is the managing editor of "a website highly critical of the church."

John Dehlin, a Mormon blogger, said he believed publicity to be the plaintiff's goal, and that it worked, based on the 800,000 page views to the plaintiff's website on 4 February, a record for that site. Monson did not appear at the 14 March hearing, but instead was represented by legal counsel, who contested the summons. On 20 March 2014, Howard Riddle, then chief magistrate, ruled that the case was "an abuse of the process of the court" and that "the court is being manipulated to provide a high-profile forum to attack the religious beliefs of others".

=== Myanmar Embassy trespassing case ===
Kyaw Zwar Minn, Myanmar's ambassador to the UK, is supposed to appear at Westminster Magistrates' Court on 30 May 2025 after he was charged with trespassing on a diplomat's premises on 6 May 2025. He was locked out of the Myanmar embassy after he opposed the 2021 Myanmar coup d'etat.

=== Maharaja of Jammu and Kashmir case ===
In 2025, Ankit Love submitted the State Immunity Act Certificate 1978 to a judge at Westminster Magistrates' Court after an incident at the Pakistan High Commission during the 2025 India-Pakistan conflict protests. The certificate produced under the authority of the secretary of state stated:

1. His Majesty's Government does accord recognition to Jammu and Kashmir as a State for the purposes of Part I of the Act; and 2. The FCDO has a record of Mr Ankit Love (born in August 1983) as a sovereign head of State on which immunities and privileges are conferred by Part I of the Act.

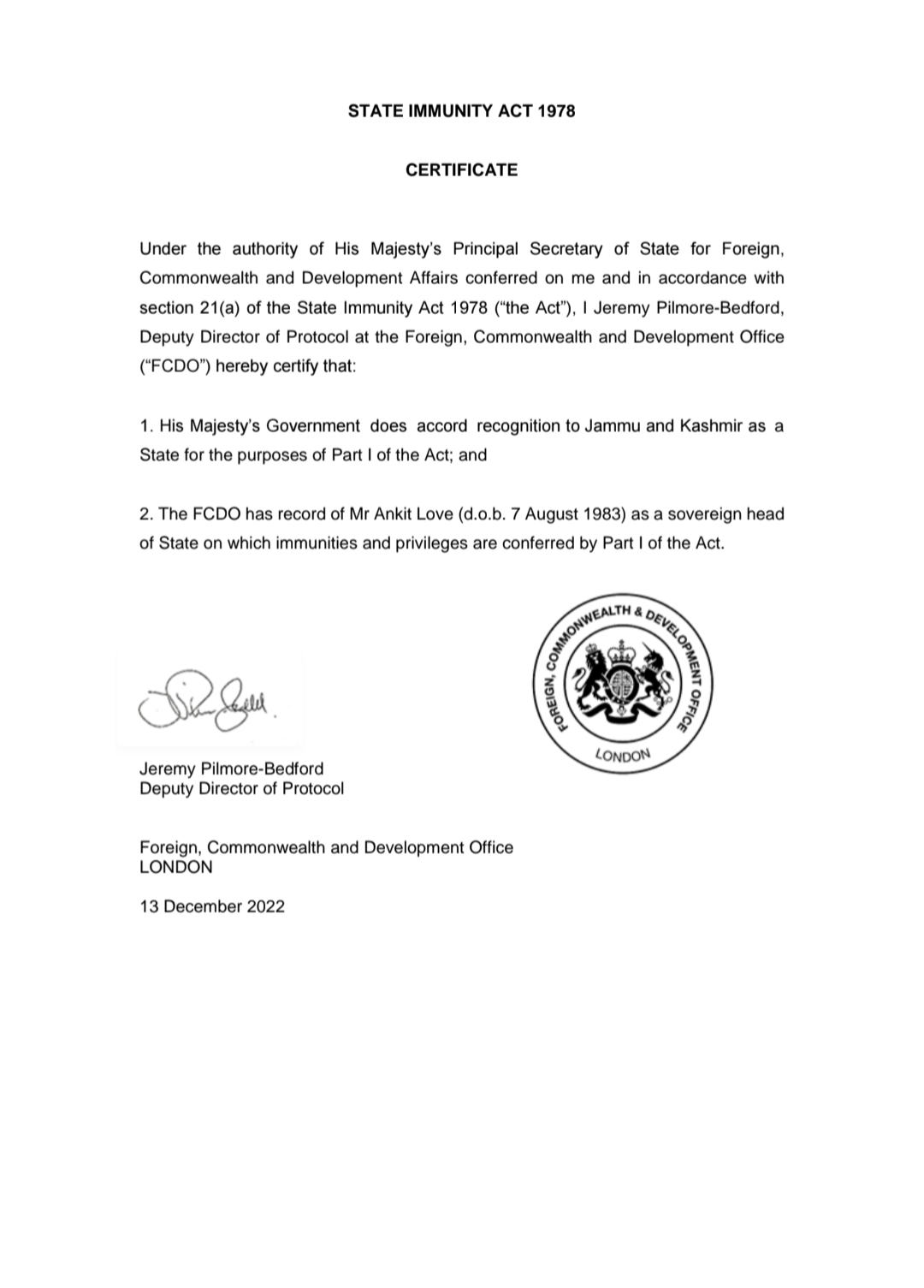
State Immunity Act Certificate 1978 issued on 13 December 2022, under the authority of His Majesty's Principal Secretary of State for Foreign, Commonwealth and Development Affairs and submitted to Westminster Magistrates Court' in 2025.

=== Julian Assange extradition case ===
On 2 May 2019 the first hearing was held at Westminster Magistrates Court into the U.S. request for Julian Assange's extradition. When asked by Judge Snow whether he consented to extradition, Assange replied, "I do not wish to surrender myself for extradition for doing journalism that has won many, many awards and protected many people". On 13 June, British home secretary Sajid Javid said he had signed the extradition order. Towards the end of 2019, Judge Emma Arbuthnot, who had presided at several of the extradition hearings, withdrew from the case for what she described as a "perception of bias" after reports about her family's connections to the intelligence services and defence industries. Vanessa Baraitser was appointed as the presiding judge.

On 4 January 2021 Judge Baraitser ruled that Assange could not be extradited to the United States, citing concerns about his mental health and the risk of suicide in a US prison.
