= Anti-Separation League =

- Ideology: pro-Dominion

The Anti-Separation League was a political alliance in Burma.

== History ==
The alliance was formed in July 1932 by parties that were not in favour of Burma being separated from British Raj in order to contest the 1932 general elections, as the British government had indicated that it would take the outcome of the elections as an indication of Burmese opinion. Despite its name, the Anti Separation League was not in favour of maintaining the union with India, wanting Dominion status along with separation.

The alliance included the main factions of the General Council of Burmese Associations and the former Home Rule Party and Swaraj Party factions of the Nationalist Party. Unlike its poorly-funded opponent, the Separation League, the Anti-Separation League was backed by Indian commercial interests concerned by the prospect of separation. The alliance was also backed by Buddhist monks, who the Separation League sought to ban from political involvement.

The League soon split into two groups; the Chit Hlaing faction led by Chit Hlaing, U Myat Tha Dun and U Paw Tun and the Ba Maw faction led by Ba Maw, Kyaw Myint and Ramree U Maung Maung. In the elections the League won 42 seats, defeating the Separationists. However, when the Legislative Council met, the alliance refused to support a motion calling for Burma to remain part of India.
