= 21 Party =

The 21 Party (Burmese: ၂၁ ဦးပါတီ) was a political party in Burma in the 1920s led by U Ba Pe.

== History ==
The party was formed in 1922 following a split in the General Council of Burmese Associations (GCBA). The GCBA had planned to boycott the local and national elections due that year, but a group of 21 dissidents left the organisation to form a new party.

In the elections the 21 Party won 28 of the 58 non-communal seats, becoming the largest party in the Legislative Council. However, it held less than a third of the total of 103 seats, and Joseph Augustus Maung Gyi from the pro-British Independent Party was appointed head of government.

Prior to the 1925 elections the party was succeeded by the Nationalist Party.
