= Embassy of Myanmar, London =

Embassy of Myanmar in London ပြည်ထောင်စုသမ္မတမြန်မာနိုင်ငံတော်သံရုံး၊ ယူနိုက်တက်ကင်းဒမ်း
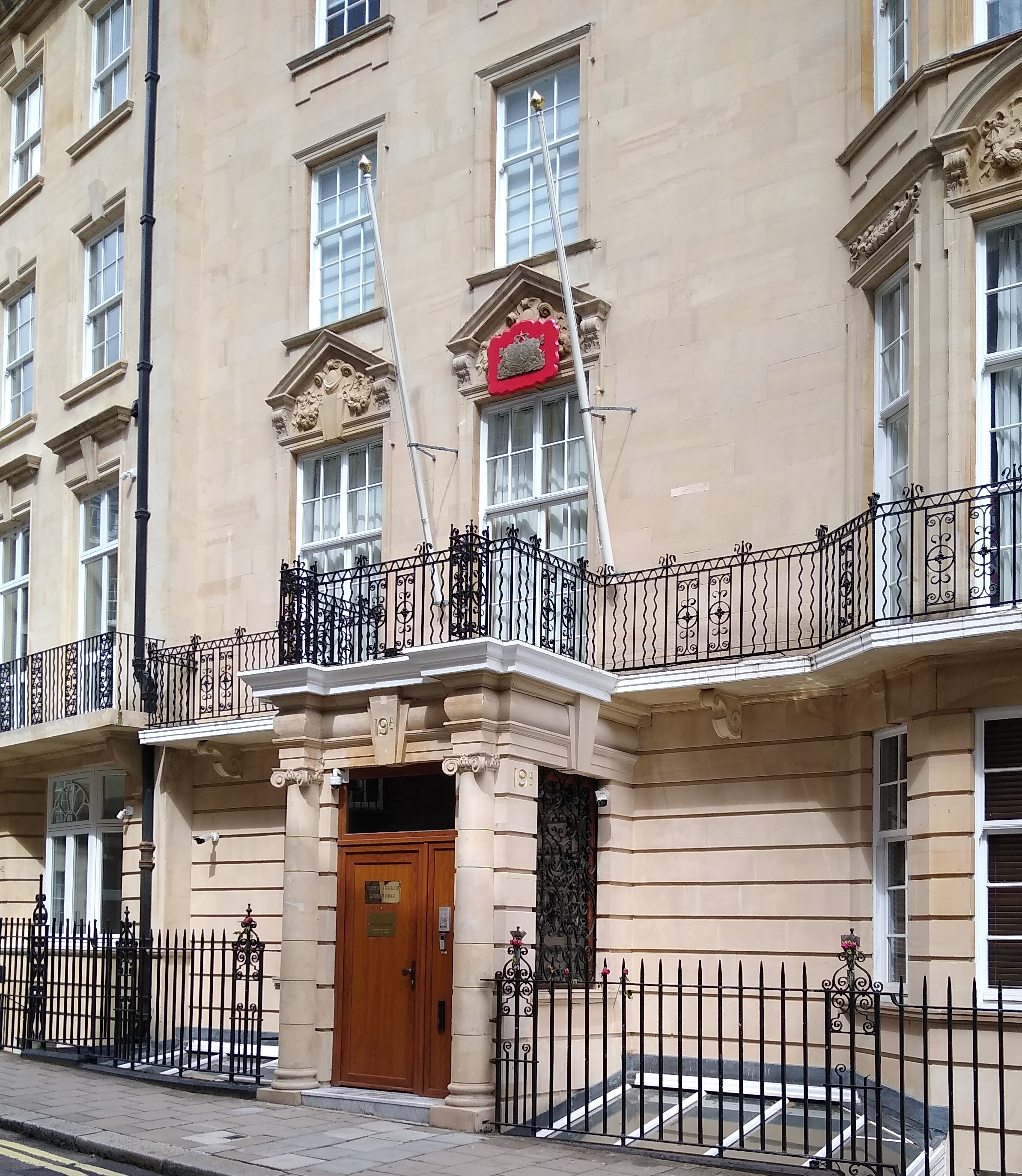
- Location: Mayfair, London
- Address: 19A Charles Street, London, W1J 5DX
- Coordinates: 51°30′26.9″N 0°8′54.2″W
- Ambassador: Kyaw Zwar Minn

The Embassy of Myanmar in London, also referred to as the Embassy of Burma, is the diplomatic mission of Myanmar in the United Kingdom.

Kyaw Zwar Minn had served as Ambassador to the United Kingdom since 5 March 2014, when he presented his Letters of Credence to Queen Elizabeth II. In response to the coup d'état carried out in Myanmar on 1st February 2021, Ambassador Kyaw Zwar Minn publicly demanded, on 8 March, the release of State Counsellor Aung San Suu Kyi and President Win Myint with denying the legitimacy of the junta's rule. On 7 April 2021 Minn was locked out of the Embassy by its pro-junta military attaché.

== Gallery ==
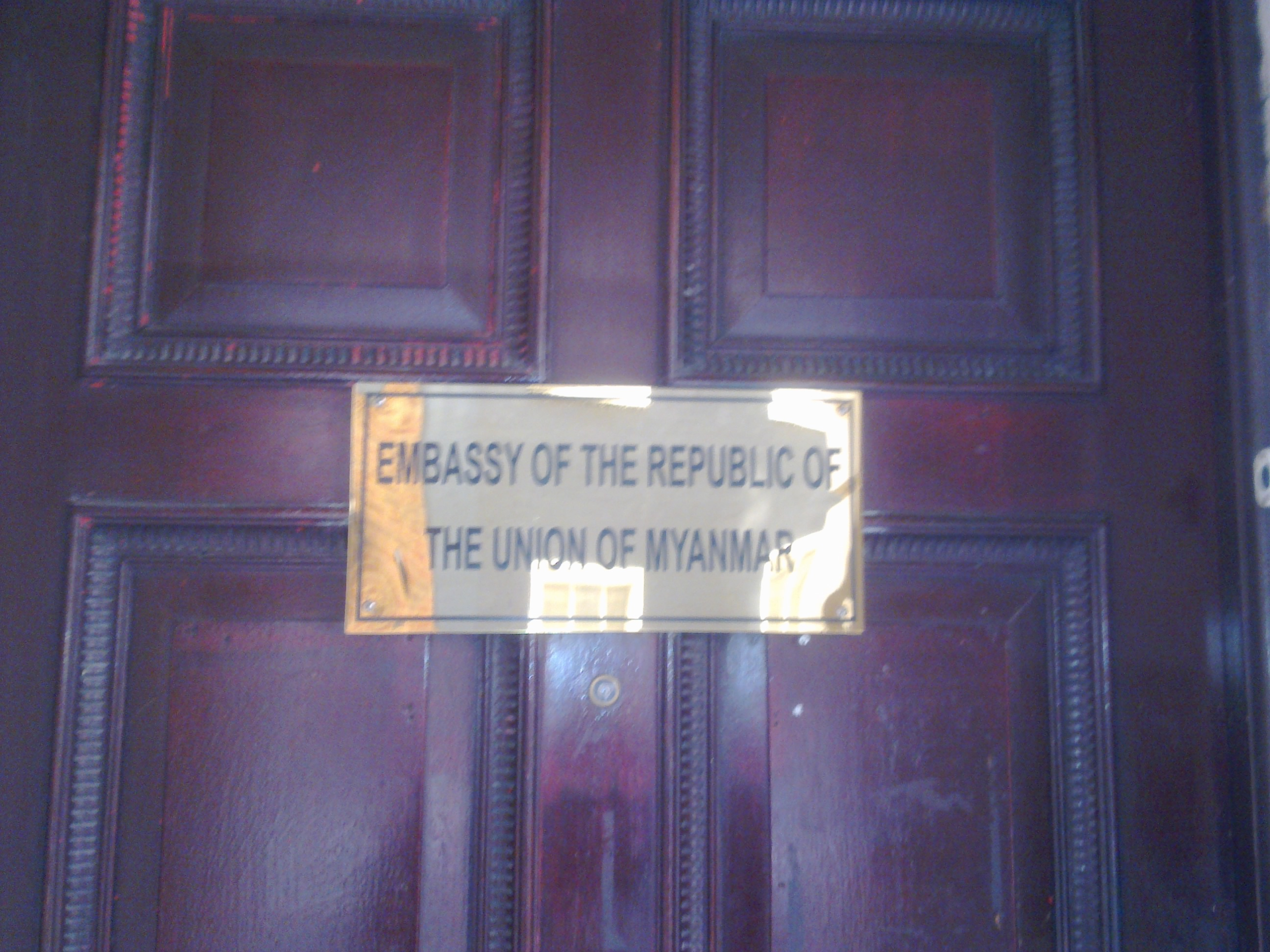
Plaque outside the embassy

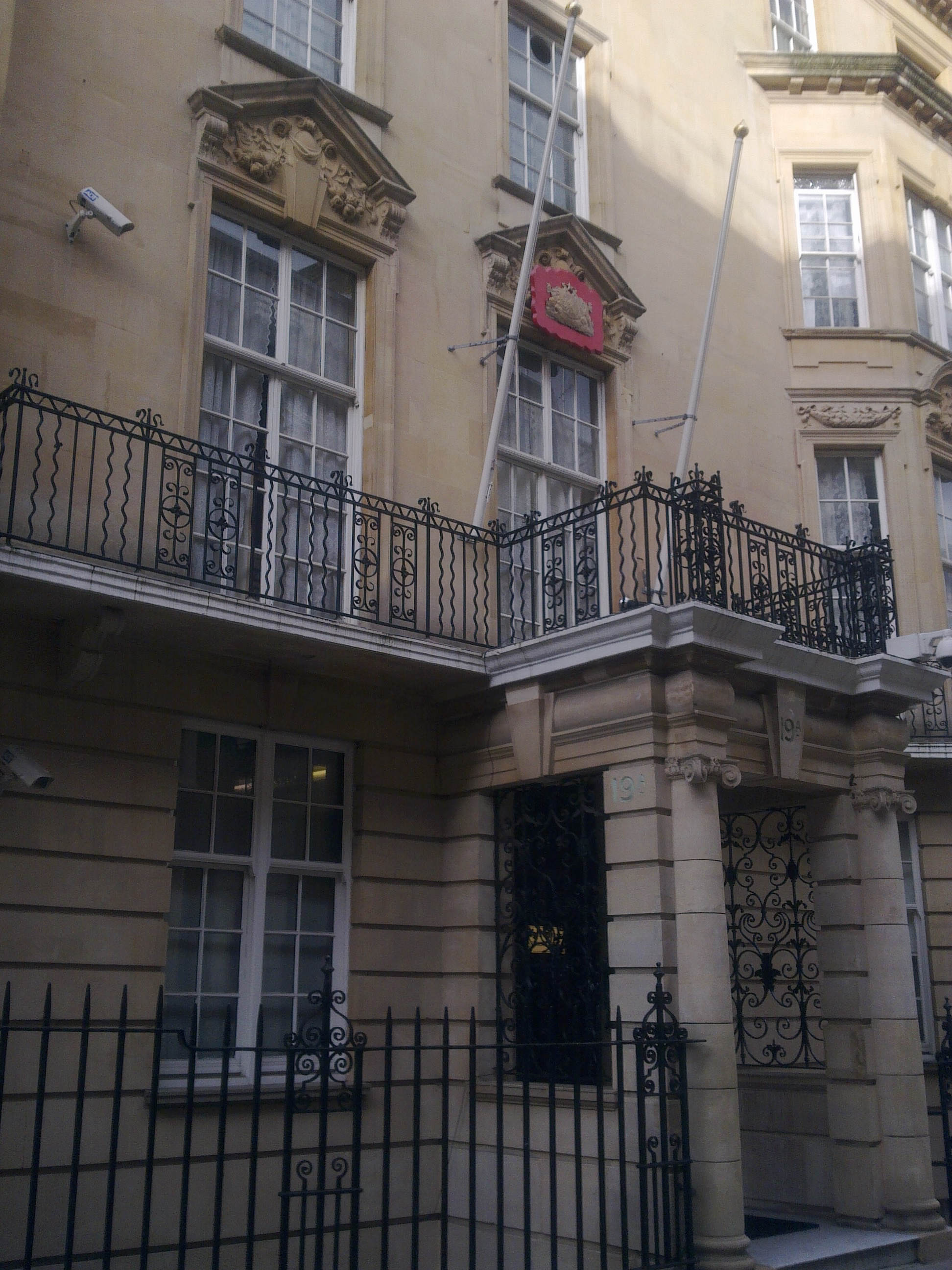
Alternative view of the embassy; the State Seal of Burma can be seen affixed above the entrance
