= Kyaw Zwar Minn =

Burmese diplomat (born 1958)

His Excellency Kyaw Zwar Minn ဦးကျော်စွာမင်း
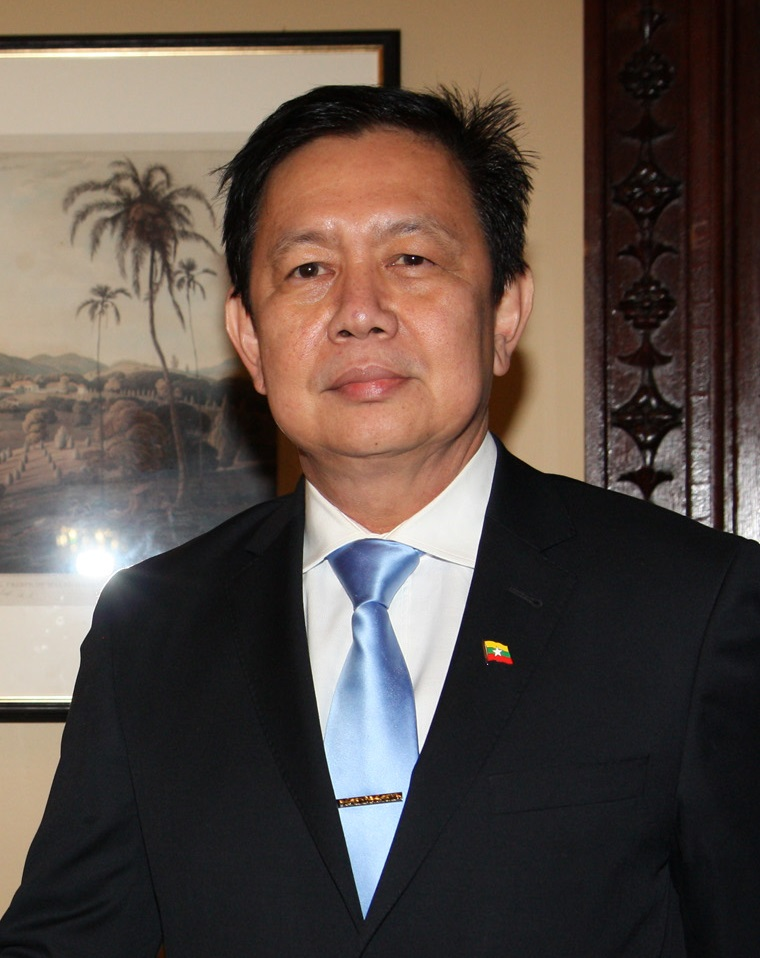
- Kyaw Zwar Minn in 2013

Ambassador of Myanmar to the United Kingdom
- Incumbent
- Assumed office 28 October 2013
- Preceded by: Than Htike (Chargé d'affaires)

Ambassador of Myanmar to France
- In office 6 June 2011 – 7 April 2021
- Preceded by: Saw Hla Min
- Succeeded by: Han Thu

Personal details
- Born: Kyaw Zwar Minn; 2 June 1958 (age 68) Union of Burma (now Myanmar)
- Profession: Diplomat

Kyaw Zwar Minn (Burmese: ဦးကျော်စွာမင်း U Kyaw Zwar Minn) is a Burmese diplomat who is serving as Ambassador of Myanmar to the United Kingdom, and non-resident Ambassador to Sweden, Ireland and Denmark since 2013.

In response to the coup d'état carried out in Myanmar on 1 February 2021, Ambassador Kyaw Zwar Minn publicly demanded, on 8 March, the release of State Counsellor Aung San Suu Kyi and President Win Myint with denying the legitimacy of the junta's rule. Myanmar recalled Kyaw Zwar Minn on 9 March 2021, after he publicly called for the release of jailed State Counsellor Aung San Suu Kyi. He refused to return to Myanmar citing safety concerns. On 7 April 2021, Minn was locked out of the Embassy of Myanmar in London. British Foreign Secretary Dominic Raab condemned the "bullying actions of the Myanmar military regime", but the Foreign Office has stated that it "must accept the decision taken by the Myanmar regime".

He previously served as Burmese Ambassador to France, and non-resident Ambassador to Andorra, Spain and Switzerland.

On 6 May 2025, the Metropolitan Police charged Kyaw Zwar Minn with trespassing on a diplomat's premises. His first appearance at Westminster Magistrates' Court began on 30 May.
