= National Parliamentary Organisation =

Political party in Burma in 1928

The National Parliamentary Organisation (Burmese: အမျိုးသား ပါလီမန် ဖြစ်မြောက်ရေးအဖွဲ့) was a political party in Burma.

== History ==
The party was formed in order to contest the 1928 elections. It won five seats, and joined the People's Party bloc in the Legislative Council. Following the elections, the NPO merged into the People's Party.
