= Home Rule Party =

Home Rule Party may refer to:

- Home Rule Party (Burma)
- Home Rule Party (Faroe Islands)
- Home Rule Party of Hawaii
- Home Rule Party (Iceland)
- Home Rule League (Ireland)
- British Empire Citizens' and Workers' Home Rule Party (Trinidad and Tobago)
