= Toke Gyi =

Tharaja Toke Gyi

Member of the Lok Sabha
- In office 1924–1930

Personal details
- Born: 23 June 1884 Rangoon, Burma
- Died: 10 May 1931 (aged 46) Moulmein, British Burma
- Cause of death: stroke
- Occupation: Politician; administrator; publisher

Tharaja U Toke Gyi (Burmese: သရာဇ ဦးတုတ်ကြီး; 23 June 1884 – 10 May 1931) was a Burmese politician, administrator, publisher and newspaper editor. He was a member of the Lok Sabha, the lower house of India.

== Early life and education ==
Toke Gyi was born on 23 June 1884 in Rangoon, Burma to parents Maung Gyi, a merchant, and his wife Daw Gyi. He was the third of four siblings. His father died when he was five years old.

He educated high school from the government high school and received a scholarship in the seventh grade. In 1904, he passed the entrance exam for the University of Calcutta but instead chose to continue his education at Rangoon College. He received a scholarship to the college for four consecutive years and received his BA in 1908.

== Career ==
After graduating, he took the mayoral exam and served as the mayor of Dedaye from 1908 to 1920. During his tenure as mayor, he became a member of the Young Men's Buddhist Association (YMBA) and he opposed the tradition of kneeling down when welcoming the British district governor. In 1920, he resigned as mayor.

In 1920, he served as the secretary of the both Young Men's Buddhist Association and General Council of Burmese Associations (GCBA). He has attended as YMBA's press representative to general conferences. In 1921, he worked as an editor and managing director of Thuriya newspaper until his resignation in 1927. He was also an editor of "Burma of Bazarbar", an English language newspaper published by Thuriya. He served as chairman of the Rangoon Traffic Committee after the first tram strike in Rangoon.

In 1924, he was elected as a member of the Lok Sabha, the lower house of India. In 1927, he was re-elected for his post. Of the 144 members of India's lower house at the time, four were from Burma. He was elected as chairman of the All India Postal Workers' Conference.

On 2 August 1925, he left from the 21-member group GCBA and then founded the Tharaja Party (Burma Swart Party). Tharaja means "the right to govern one's own country."

On 16 August 1929, he launched the weekly newspaper Kaythara. In 1930, he attended an assembly of the Parliament in India to open the western slope of the Shwedagon Pagoda. While attending, he suffered a stroke and was unconscious for 20 days. He died on 10 May 1931, aged 46, six months after returning to Moulmein.
