= 1925 Burmese general election =

- 17 November 1925

80 of the 103 seats in the Legislative Council
- Turnout: 16%

Elections to the Legislative Council were held in Burma on 17 November 1925. Under the terms of the dyarchy constitution, the Legislative Council of Burma was advisory to the British colonial governor, and had some direct authority over education, local government, public health, agriculture and forests. The Nationalist Party received the most votes, but was unable to form a government as the British authorities favoured the Independent Party, who formed a government led by Joseph Augustus Maung Gyi.

== Electoral system ==
The Legislative Council had 103 members, of which 80 were elected; 58 "non-communal" seats elected by a common roll, and 24 "communal" seats reserved for ethnic minorities (eight for Indians, five for Karens, one European and one Anglo-Indian) and business groups (two for the Burma Chamber of Commerce, and one each for the Burmese Chamber of Commerce, the Chinese Chamber of Commerce, the Indian Chamber of Commerce, the Rangoon Trades Association and Rangoon University). A further 21 seats were appointed by the Governor (a maximum of 14 of which could be government officials) and there were also two ex officio members, the two members of the Executive Council of the Governor.

== Campaign ==
The Burmese branch of the Swaraj Party led by Toke Gyi put forward 20 candidates. The Independent Party had 85 candidates, whilst there were 49 Nationalist Party candidates running.

== Results ==
The Swaraj Party performed poorly, with Toke Gyi defeated in his constituency. Voter turnout was just 16%, although this marked an increase on the turnout of 6.9% in the 1922 elections. This was put down to the success of elected politicians in amending controversial laws during their period in office, as well as an increase in the number of political parties.

Party	Seats
Nationalist Party	25
Independent Party	20
Home Rule Party	11
Swaraj Party	9
Others	15
Appointed members	21
Ex officio members	2
Total	103
Source: Haruhiro Fukui
