= Myanmar passport =

Passport issued to Myanmar citizens

Myanmar passport နိုင်ငံကူးလက်မှတ်
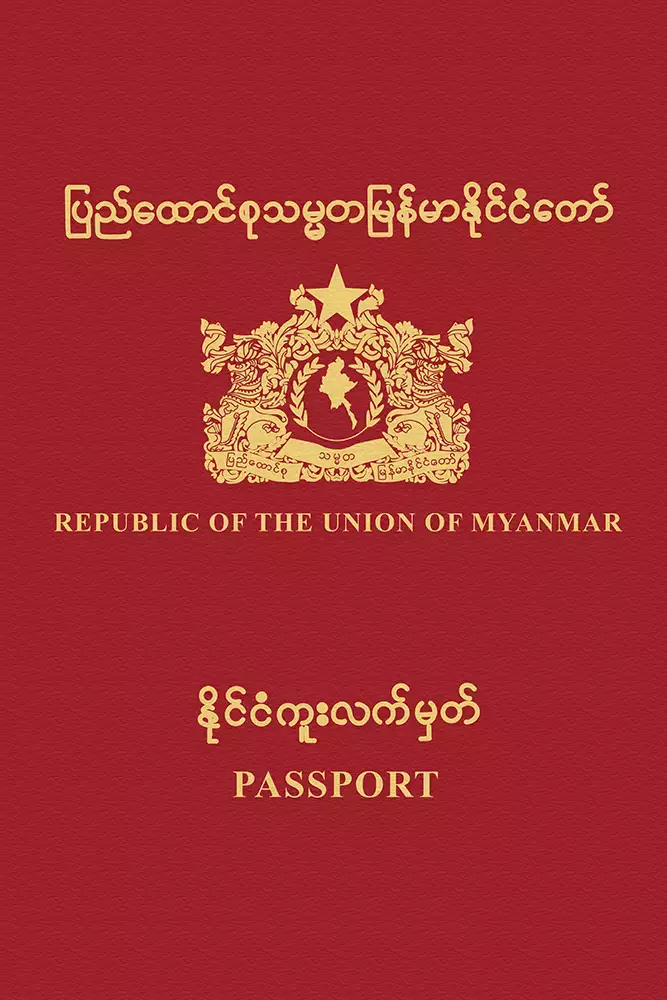
- Front cover ordinary Myanmar passport.

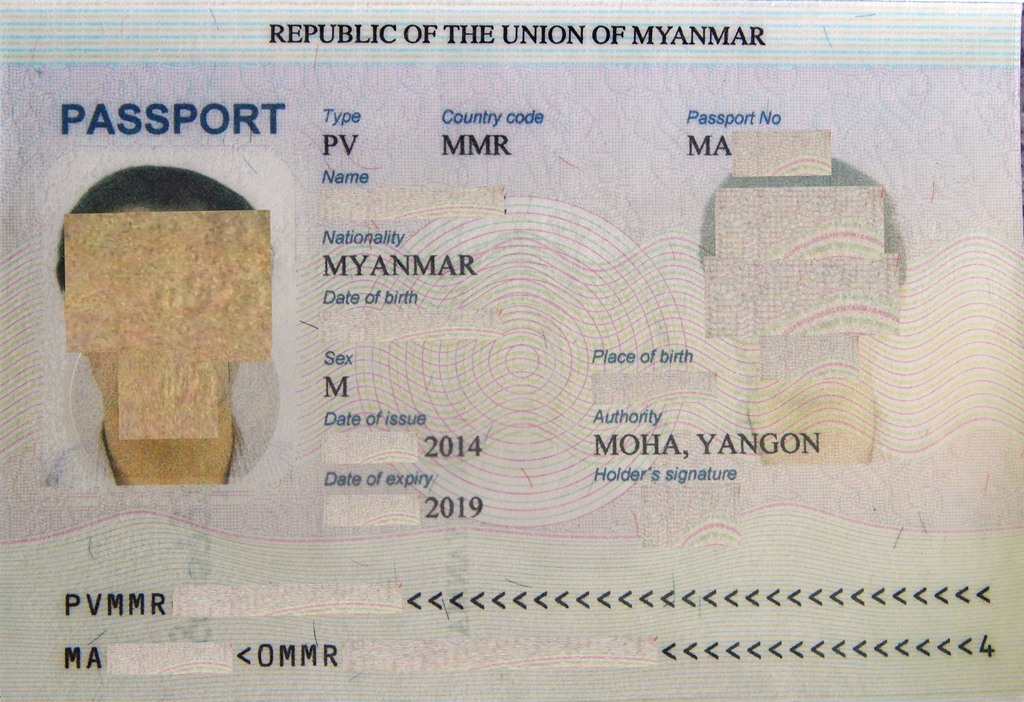
- Biometrics data page
- Type: Passport
- Issued by: Ministry of Home Affairs; Ministry of Foreign Affairs
- First issued: 1948 (first version); April 2010 (machine-readable passport); 2025 (enhanced security features)
- Purpose: Identification and International Travel
- Eligibility: Myanmar citizenship
- Expiration: 5 years
- Cost: Ks 45,000

The Myanmar passport is the passport issued to citizens of Myanmar, formerly Burma, for the purpose of international travel.

== Offices ==
In 2014, authorities opened new passport issuing centres in Myanmar in addition to the existing two offices in Yangon and Mandalay. The new offices were opened in each seven states and seven regions of Myanmar, and also in the country’s capital Naypyidaw.

In 2022, a new QR code system was introduced as a new requirement for applicants. The system was taken offline in December 2022. Many passport applicants now rely on brokers who charge different prices for faster appointment dates. Overseas embassies often require applicants to visit in-person to schedule appointments, placing burdens on applicants in foreign cities without an embassy or consulate.

== Types ==
In April 2010, the Myanmar passport was upgraded from a hand-written format to a machine-readable passport (MRP) compliant with International Civil Aviation Organization (ICAO) standards. This modernisation brought the passport in line with international norms for automated border processing.

There are three types of passport issued primarily by the Ministry of Home Affairs. Government officials are issued with a green passport. Diplomats are issued with a blue passport. All other citizens receive a red passport. The red passport is valid for 5 years and the green passport for 3 years.

Passport types by colour
Cover colour	Type	Issued to	Validity
Red	Ordinary passport	All eligible citizens	5 years
Green	Official passport	Government officials	Varies
Blue	Diplomatic passport	Diplomats and senior officials	Varies

In 2016, the Ministry of Home Affairs announced that nine types of passports in different colours would be issued to Myanmar citizens. The nine types are:

- PB – Business Passport;
- PT – Dependent Passport;
- PJ – Job Passport;
- PR – Religious Passport;
- PS – Seaman Passport;
- PE – Student Passport;
- PV – Visit Passport;
- PD – Diplomatic Passport and
- PO – Official Passport.

The three most common types issued are PV, PS and PJ passports. PJ Passport holders have been required to present an additional Overseas Worker Identification Card since the 2021 Myanmar coup d'état.

== Passport Information ==
=== Identity Information Page ===
The Myanmar passport includes the following data:

- Photo of Passport Holder
- Type
- Country Code
- Passport No.
- Name
- Nationality
- Date of Birth
- Sex
- Place of Birth
- Date of Issue
- Date of Expiry
- Authority (issuing passport)
- Holder's Signature

The information page ends with the Machine Readable Zone.

The passport does not include a Given or Last Name section as Burmese names do not typically have a serial structure nor patronymic/matronymic names.

=== Languages ===
The data page/information page is printed in English.
The passport is printed in English and Burmese.

== Visa requirements ==
Countries and territories with visa-free entries or visas on arrival for holders of regular Myanmar passports Myanmar Visa free access Visa on arrival eVisa Visa available both on arrival or online Visa required

In 2019, Myanmar citizens had visa-free or visa on arrival access to 46 countries and territories, ranking the Myanmar passport 95th in the world according to the Visa Restrictions Index. The political consequences of the coup have also affected the passport's international standing. The number of visa-free destinations available to Myanmar passport holders declined from 46 in 2019 to 43 by February 2026, according to the Henley Passport Index.

From onwards 1 October 2025, Myanmar ordinary passport holders can travel to ASEAN members countries without a visa by tourism purposes. They are permitted to enter and remain in those countries for not more than 14 days without visa except the Indonesia, Philippines, Singapore and Vietnam, which permits a stay of up to 30 days. There are some central asian countries and african countries which permits a stay without a visa.

Visa on Arrival for Myanmar citizens is available in Maldives and Macau while an eVisa is available to enter India and some others countries. The Transit Without Visa (TWOV) is applicable at KLIA and KLIA2 airport for Myanmar citizens holding ordinary passports for a maximum of 120 hours stop-over in Malaysia.

== Former passports ==
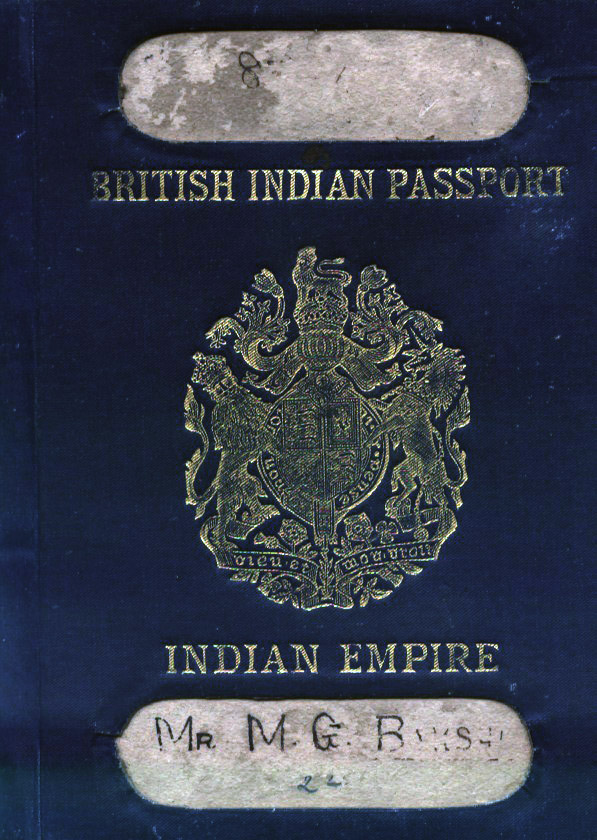
The front cover of a British Indian passport.

Prior to Burmese independence in 1948, British Indian passports were issued to residents of Burma when it was a part of the British Raj.
