= Swaraj Party (Burma) =

The Swaraj Party (Burmese: ဆွာရပ်ဂျ်ပါတီ) was a political party in Burma in the 1920s.

== History ==
The party was formed by former members of the General Council of Burmese Associations prior to the 1925 elections, and was named after the Indian Swaraj Party. Its leadership included Ba Maw, N. C. Bannerjee and Toke Gyi, who was head of the party. After his death he was succeeded by U Paw Tun.

In the 1925 elections the party won nine seats. In 1926 or 1927 it merged with the Nationalist Party and the Home Rule Party to form the People's Party. Following the dissolution of the People's Party in the early 1930s, most of the former Swaraj Party leadership joined the Anti-Separation League.
