= Independent Party (Burma) =

Pro-British political party in Burma during the 1920s and 1930s

The Independent Party, also known as the Golden Valley Party, was a pro-British political party in Burma during the 1920s and 1930s. Its leadership included Joseph Augustus Maung Gyi, U Khin and U May Oung. Oscar de Glanville was also a party leader.

== History ==
The party was established as the Progressive Party in 1922, evolving from the senior faction of the Young Men's Buddhist Association, whose members were conservative, western-educated and willing to accept the colonial system of government.

Although the 1922 general elections saw the 21 Party emerge as the largest party in the Legislative Council, its leader Ba Pe refused to form a government with the Golden Valley Party, allowing Maung Gyi to head the new government.

In 1925 the party was renamed the Independent Party, also becoming known as the Golden Valley Party (Shwe Taung Gyar) in reference to the upper-class suburbs in which its leaders lived, but was not formally organised, nor had any popular support. The elections later that year (in which it won 20 of the 80 seats) and 1928 elections (12 seats) ended with the same outcome due to favouritism by the British authorities.

The party contested the 1932 elections calling for the separation of Burma from India, but were defeated by the anti-separatists, who won a landslide; Ba Maw of the Maw-Myint-Bye Party became Chief Minister. Although it failed to win a seat in the 1936 elections, Glenville and Maung Gyi were nominated to the Senate by the Governor Sir Archibald Douglas Cochrane.
