= Myanmar nationality law =

Myanmar Citizenship Law မြန်မာနိုင်ငံသားဥပဒေ

People's Assembly
- Citation: Law No. 4 of 1982
- Territorial extent: Myanmar
- Enacted by: People's Assembly
- Enacted: 15 October 1982
- Commenced: 15 October 1982
- Status: Amended

The Nationality law of Myanmar currently recognises three categories of citizens, namely citizens, associate citizens, and naturalised citizens, according to the 1982 Citizenship Law. Citizens, as defined by the 1947 Constitution, are persons who belong to an "indigenous race", have a grandparent from an "indigenous race", are children of citizens, or lived in British Burma prior to 1942.

Under the Burma Residents Registration Act of 1949 and the 1951 Resident Registration Rules, Burmese citizens are required to obtain a National Registration Card (နိုင်ငံသားစိစစ်ရေးကတ်ပြား, NRC), while non-citizens are given a Foreign Registration Card (နိုင်ငံခြားသားစိစစ်ရေးကတ်ပြား, FRC). Citizens whose parents hold FRCs are not allowed to run for public office. In 1989, the government conducted a nationwide citizenship scrutiny process to replace NRCs with citizenship scrutiny cards (CSCs) to certify citizenship.

Myanmar has a stratified citizenship system. Burmese citizens' rights are distinctively different depending on the category they belong to and based on how their forebears acquired their own citizenship category.

- Full citizens (နိုင်ငံသား) are descendants of residents who lived in Burma prior to 1823 or were born to parents who were citizens at the time of birth.
- Associate citizens (ဧည့်နိုင်ငံသား) are those who acquired citizenship through the 1948 Union Citizenship Law.
- Naturalised citizens (နိုင်ငံသားပြုခွင့်ရသူ) are those who lived in Burma before 4 January 1948 and applied for citizenship after 1982.

== Documentation ==
The Myanmar government issues several forms of identity cards to Myanmar citizens and residents.

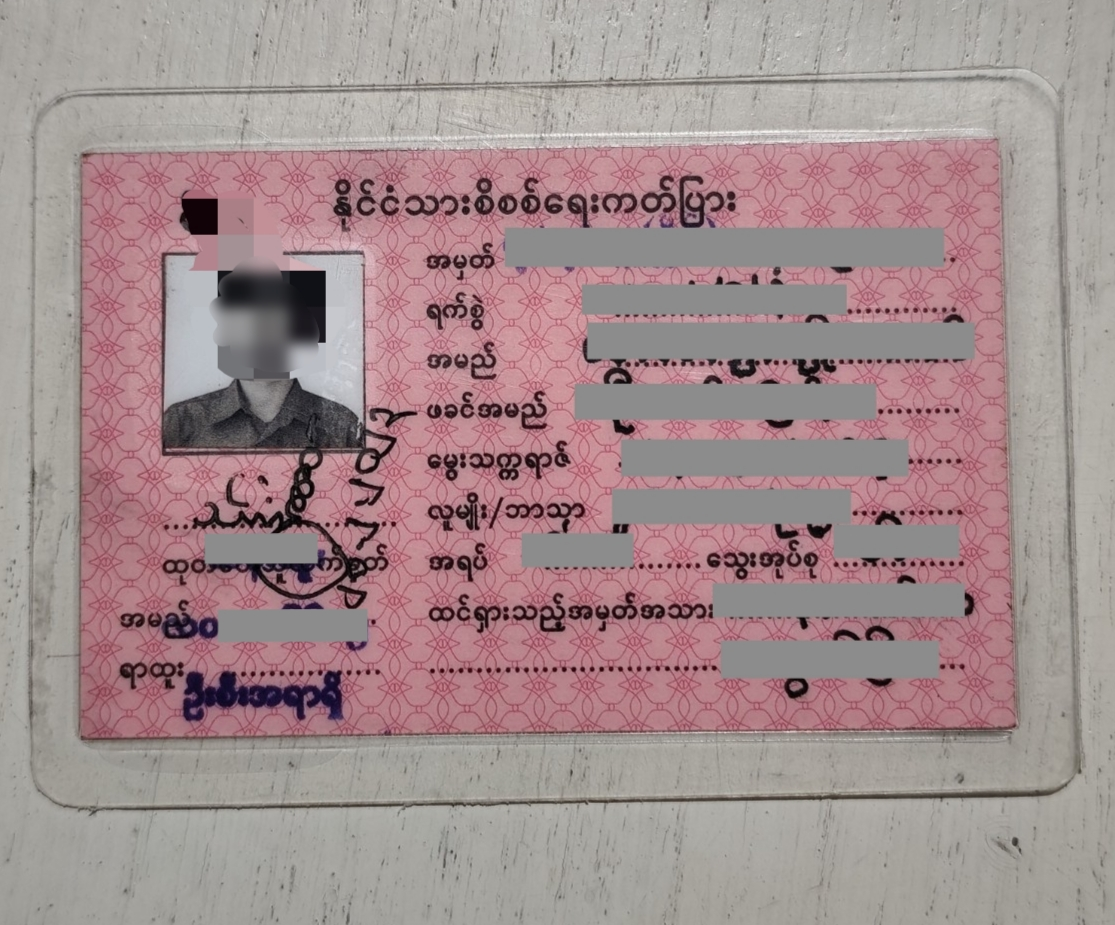
Myanmar Citizenship scrutiny card

=== Citizenship Scrutiny Card ===
Citizenship scrutiny card နိုင်ငံသားစိစစ်ရေးကတ်ပြား
- Type: Identity card
- Issued by: Myanmar
- Purpose: Citizenship
- Valid in: Myanmar
- Eligibility: Myanmar citizens
- Expiration: Varies

Citizenship scrutiny cards (နိုင်ငံသားစိစစ်ရေးကတ်ပြား) are issued to prove Myanmar citizenship. Citizens are eligible to receive a citizenship scrutiny card once they turn 10 years old. The cards are paper-based and handwritten, and are issued by local township administration offices. Citizenship scrutiny cards denote the following details:

- Obverse side:
  - Name – in Burmese letters
  - Photograph
  - Identification number – Formatted as #/XXX(suffix)######
    - First element is a number representing an individual's state or region (1 to 14)
    - Second element is a series of three Burmese letters representing the individual's township
    - Third element is a suffix indicating the type of citizenship (full, associate, or naturalised)
    - Fourth element is a unique serial number consisting of six digits
  - Date of issue
  - Father's name
  - Birthplace
  - Ethnicity
  - Religion
  - Height
  - Blood type
  - Signature and rank of issuer
  - Notable physical attributes
- Reverse side:
  - Fingerprint
  - Occupation
  - Domicile
  - Signature of holder

Citizenship tier	Abbreviation (Burmese)	Documentation	Card colour
Full	နိုင် (C)	Citizenship Scrutiny Card	Pink
Associate	ဧည့် (AC)	Associate Citizenship Scrutiny Card	Blue
Naturalised	ပြု (N)	Naturalised Citizenship Scrutiny Card	Green

=== Other forms of documentation ===
The Burmese government also issues three-fold national registration cards (NRCs) to prove residency. Until 31 May 2015, temporary registration / identification certificates were issued as proof of identity and residence for non-citizens, including Burmese residents of Chinese, Indian, and Rohingya origin. These were replaced with the turquoise-coloured identity card for national verification, introduced on 1 June 2015. Foreign registration certificates with one-year validity periods are issued to foreigners residing in the country.

The Ministry of Health issues birth certificates through township medical officers. Birth certificates are used to add children to a family's household list, enroll them in primary school, and apply for citizenship scrutiny cards.

== Dual citizenship ==
Dual citizenship is not recognised under Myanmar law.

== Naturalisation ==
Foreigners who have been in the country since 1948 can also apply for nationality.

== Denial of citizenship to Rohingya ==
Myanmar law does not consider the Rohingya as one of the country's 135 legally recognised ethnic groups, thus denying most of them citizenship. The official claim of the Government of Myanmar is that the Rohingya people are "citizens of Bangladesh"; however, the Government of Bangladesh does not recognize this claim, thus leaving the Rohingya stateless.

== See also ==
- Visa policy of Myanmar
- Visa requirements for Myanmar citizens
