= Maung Gyee =

Burmese diplomat, politician (1886–1971)

Sir Maung Gyee (1886 – 16 July 1971) was a Burmese lawyer, politician, and diplomat. He was also known as M. A. Maung Gyee, a reference to his MA from Calcutta University, to distinguish him from Sir Joseph Augustus Maung Gyi, with whose career he overlapped.

Educated at Rangoon, Calcutta, London and Oxford, Gyee was called to the English bar by the Middle Temple in 1911. A nationalist politician and a member of the moderate 21 Party, he was Minister of Education, Local Government and Public Health from 1923 to 1925. In 1927, he was unseated from the legislation for corrupt practices by an electoral petition filed by U Ba Tin. In 1931, he was a delegate to the Round Table Conference. In 1937 he attended the coronation of George VI as a member of the Burmese delegation.

He was President of the Senate of Burma from 1937 to 1940, when he was appointed Counsellor to the Governor of Burma, serving until 1942. From 1943 to 1944 he was a Judge of the Supreme Court at Rangoon during the Japanese occupation. From 1947 to 1947, he was Minister for Public Works and Rehabilitation on the Executive Council. He was knighted in 1942.

From 1947 to 1948, Gyee served as Burmese High Commissioner, then ambassador to the United Kingdom.

He came out of retirement in 1960 as leader of the Buddhist Democratic Party, created to contest the 1960 Burmese general election.
