= Visa policy of Myanmar =

Policy on permits required to enter Myanmar

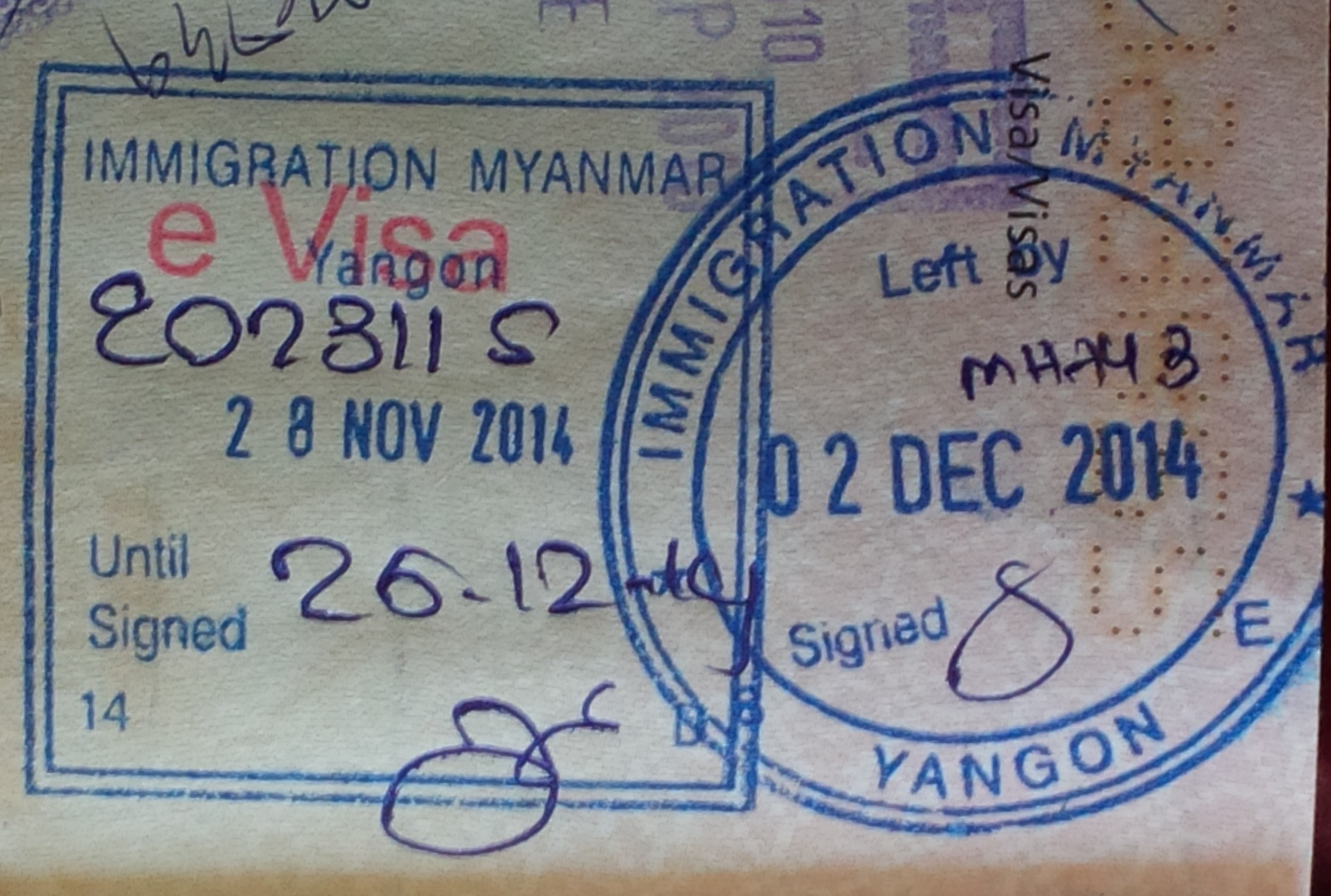
Passport stamps

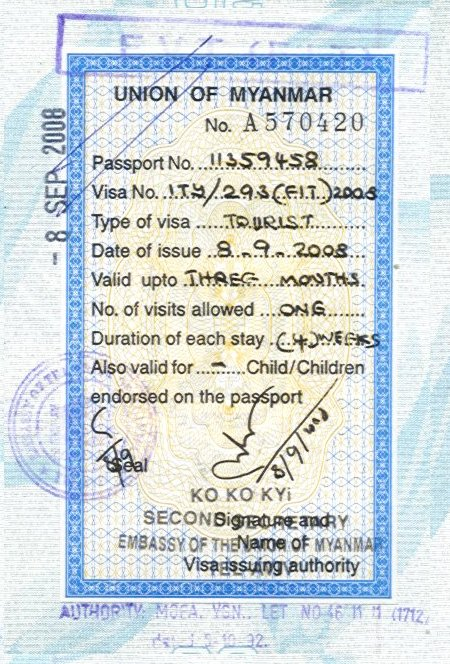
Myanmar visa

Visitors to Myanmar must obtain a visa unless they are citizens of one of the visa-exempt countries or citizens who are eligible for a visa on arrival or an e-Visa.

All visitors to Myanmar must hold a passport valid for at least 6 months.

== Visa policy map ==
Visa policy of Myanmar Myanmar Visa not required (30 days) Visa not required (14 days) Visa on arrival / eVisa eVisa (business / tourism) eVisa (tourism only) Visa required

== Visa exemption ==
=== Ordinary passports ===
- Singapore
Citizens of Singapore may enter Myanmar without a visa for both tourist and business purposes for a maximum stay of 30 days. They may enter and leave Myanmar through any port of entry.

Citizens of the following countries may enter Myanmar without a visa for tourist purposes up to the duration listed below. However, to qualify for visa-free entry, they must enter and leave Myanmar through one of the following ports of entry:

- Yangon International Airport
- Nay Pyi Taw International Airport
- Mandalay International Airport

30 days

- Russia^{#}
- Belarus^{#}
- Vietnam

14 days

- Brunei
- Cambodia
- Indonesia
- Laos
- Malaysia
- Philippines
- Thailand

_{# - May also enter Myanmar without a visa for business purposes.}

=== Non-ordinary passports ===
Holders of diplomatic and official / service passports of the following countries do not require a visa to enter Myanmar for stays up to the duration listed below:

- ASEAN member states^{2} (except Brunei, Indonesia and Timor-Leste)

- Bangladesh^{2}
- Belarus^{1}
- Brazil^{2}
- Brunei^{3}
- China^{2}
- Colombia^{1}
- India^{1}
- Indonesia^{3}
- Israel^{1}
- Japan^{1 D}
- Jordan^{1}
- Mongolia^{2}
- Morocco^{1}
- Nepal^{1}
- North Korea^{2}
- Russia^{1}
- Serbia^{1}
- South Korea^{1}
- Sri Lanka^{2}

_{D - Diplomatic passports only.}
_{1 – 90 days}
_{2 – 30 days}
_{3 – 14 days}

=== History ===
From 1 October 2018 until 30 September 2020, tourists hailing from Hong Kong, Macao, Japan and South Korea were allowed entry into Myanmar without a visa. They were permitted to enter by and depart from any port of entry in Myanmar.

Date of visa changes

Visa exemption

- 20 November 2009: Laos
- 26 October 2013: Vietnam
- 18 December 2013: Cambodia
- 4 January 2014: Philippines
- 10 May 2014: Indonesia
- 1 September 2014: Brunei
- 11 August 2015: Thailand
- 1 December 2016: Singapore
- 1 October 2018: Hong Kong, Macau, Japan, South Korea
- 1 January 2020: Vietnam (extension from 14 to 30 days)
- 1 July 2022: Russia (temporary regime, extended)
- 1 October 2025: Malaysia
- 27 January 2026: Russia
- 8 July 2026: Belarus

Visa on arrival

- 1 October 2018: China
- 1 December 2018: India
- 1 October 2019: Australia, Germany, Italy, Russia, Spain, Switzerland
- 19 December 2019: Austria, Czech Republic, Hungary, Luxembourg, New Zealand
- 30 August 2023: China (resumed), India
- 11 March 2025: Hong Kong
- 21 October 2025: Japan, Macau, South Korea

Cancelled:

- 1 February 2020: China (visa on arrival)
- 1 October 2020: Hong Kong, Macau, Japan, South Korea (visa-free)

== Visa on arrival ==
Citizens of following countries and territories may obtain a tourist visa upon arrival at any international airport in Myanmar, for a fee of 50 USD. Visas obtained on arrival are valid for a maximum stay of 30 days.

- China^{A} ^{T1}
- Hong Kong^{A} ^{T2}
- India^{T1}
- Japan^{T3}
- Macau^{A} ^{T3}
- South Korea^{T3}

_{A - For Chinese citizens with People's Republic of China passports, Hong Kong Special Administrative Region passports or Macau Special Administrative Region passports only.}
_{T1 - From 30 August 2026 to 29 August 2027.}
_{T2 - From 11 March 2026 to 10 March 2027.}
_{T3 - From 21 October 2025 to 21 October 2026.}

== Electronic visa (e-Visa) ==
Myanmar eVisa

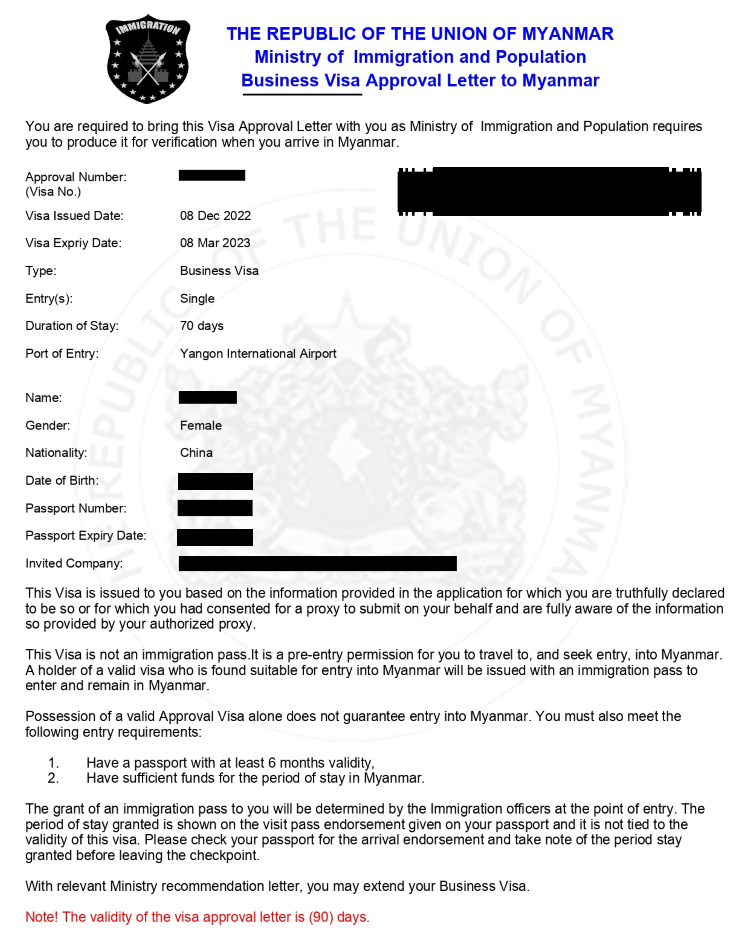
- Sample of Myanmar business eVisa approval letter
- Owner: Ministry of Immigration and Population
- Website: evisa.moip.gov.mm

Myanmar launched an e-Visa system on 1 September 2014. E-Visas are issued online for tourism and business purposes only.

An e-Visa is issued within 3 working days, is valid for 90 days from the date of issue and allows a maximum stay of up to 28 days (for tourists) or 70 days (for business travellers with an invitation). The fee for a business e-Visa is 70 USD, while a tourist e-Visa costs 50 USD. Visas are issued free of charge to children under 7.

The list of eligible countries was expanded twice, first in October 2014, then in January 2015. In July 2015, the business e-Visa was introduced.

Holders of e-Visas must enter from one of the following ports of entry:

- Yangon International Airport
- Nay Pyi Taw International Airport
- Mandalay International Airport
- Kawthaung Land Border Checkpoint with Thailand

Citizens of the following countries and territories are eligible:

- ASEAN member states (except Timor-Leste)^{A} ^{B}
- All European Union member states^{B}

- Albania
- Algeria
- Argentina
- Australia^{B}
- Bangladesh
- Belarus^{A} ^{B}
- Bhutan
- Bolivia
- Bosnia and Herzegovina
- Brazil^{B}
- Cameroon
- Canada^{B}
- Chile
- China^{A} ^{B} ^{1}
- Colombia
- Costa Rica
- Côte d’Ivoire
- Ecuador
- Egypt
- Eritrea
- Fiji
- Georgia
- Ghana
- Guatemala
- Guinea
- Hong Kong^{A} ^{B} ^{1}
- Iceland
- India^{A} ^{B}
- Israel^{B}
- Jamaica
- Japan^{A} ^{B}
- Jordan
- Kazakhstan
- Kenya
- North Korea^{B}
- Kuwait
- Kyrgyzstan
- Maldives
- Macau^{A} ^{B} ^{1}
- Mauritius
- Mexico
- Monaco
- Mongolia
- Morocco
- Nepal^{B}
- New Zealand^{B}
- Norway^{B}
- Pakistan
- Panama
- Peru
- Qatar
- Russia^{A} ^{B}
- Saudi Arabia
- Serbia
- South Africa^{B}
- South Korea^{A} ^{B}
- Sri Lanka
- Switzerland^{B}
- Taiwan^{B}
- Turkey
- Uganda
- Ukraine^{B}
- United Kingdom^{2}
- United States^{B}
- Uruguay
- Uzbekistan
- Venezuela

_{A - Countries and jurisdictions with visa-free or visa on arrival privilege.}
_{B - Countries and jurisdictions eligible for business / tourist e-Visa.}
_{1 - For Chinese citizens with People's Republic of China passports, Hong Kong Special Administrative Region passports or Macau Special Administrative Region passports only.}
_{2 - British citizens are eligible for business / tourist e-Visa. All other classes of British nationality are eligible for tourist e-Visa only.}
_{No mark - Countries eligible for tourist e-Visa only.}

The e-Visa system may be extended to other nationalities and ports of entry in the future and may include the issuance of other types of visas.

== Other arrangements ==
A visa on arrival for business purposes is available for citizens from 52 countries / territories flying into Yangon International Airport, Naypyidaw Airport or Mandalay International Airport. They must fill in an application form and provide company registration and invitation documents.

Myanmar Airways claims that nationals of all countries and jurisdictions may obtain a tourist visa on arrival valid for 28 days provided they are arriving at Yangon International Airport on a specific flight on Myanmar Airways International from Guangzhou, though this seems to conflict with the Myanmar Visa on Arrival requirements.

Visitors entering from the Mae Sai Border Post with Thailand can stay in the Tachileik-Kengtung Area for 14 days without a visa. Entering costs either 10 USD or 500 THB and the passport is kept by immigration at the border post until departure.

In August 2017, an expansion of the visa on arrival system was announced.

In October 2018, an expansion of the visa-free system was announced for early 2019.

== Visitor statistics ==
Most visitors arriving in Myanmar on short term basis were from the following countries of nationality:

Rank	Country	2016	2015	2014	2013	2012	2011
1	Thailand	243,443	204,539	198,229	139,770	94,342	61,696
2	China	183,886	147,977	125,609	90,550	70,805	62,018
3	Japan	100,084	90,312	83,434	68,671	47,690	21,321
4	United States	76,502	69,015	62,631	53,653	37,589	21,680
5	South Korea	64,397	63,715	58,472	54,934	34,805	22,524
6	France	52,304	47,235	41,453	35,462	30,064	19,414
7	United Kingdom	51,051	45,120	40,921	33,203	24,296	11,056
8	Singapore	50,198	45,125	47,692	39,140	26,296	15,391
9	Vietnam	48,869	—N/a	—N/a	—N/a	—N/a	—N/a
10	Malaysia	43,931	40,852	46,534	39,758	30,499	23,287
11	Germany	39,044	35,727	32,265	27,712	23,063	14,006
12	India	38,537	34,638	32,306	21,042	16,868	12,318
13	Taiwan	36,118	31,735	32,664	30,699	22,060	15,542
14	Australia	34,010	30,820	29,175	11,728	18,261	10,415
15	Italy	17,969	14,821	12,613	11,728	10,830	9,710
16	Philippines	16,421	—N/a	—N/a	—N/a	—N/a	—N/a
17	Canada	15,024	14,051	12,268	8,975	6,485	3,685

== See also ==
- Visa requirements for Myanmar citizens
- Foreign relations of Myanmar
