= 1928 Burmese general election =

- November 1928

80 of the 103 seats in the Legislative Council
- Turnout: 18%

Legislative Council elections were held in Burma in November 1928. Despite expectations that pro-government candidates would win, the result was a victory for the opposition, which won 45 of the 80 elected seats. However, the People's Party, the largest opposition party, was unable to form a government. Instead, the pro-British Independent Party formed the government.

== Electoral system ==
The Legislative Council had 80 elected members, who were elected in 72 constituencies. The election system was divided between representation for Karens, Indians, Europeans and businesses with the intent to counter the balance of the Bamar majority whilst allowing minority voices to be heard. The 1928 election continued a growing trend of new Burmese political parties being formed to stand for election. Around 55% of the adult population of the country was eligible to vote in the elections. Women remained barred from standing as candidates, provoking a public protest by women at the Secretariat.

The People's Party stood on a platform of abstentionism by refusing to take official offices and refusing to engage with the Simon Commission.

== Results ==
Opposition parties won 45 seats, with the People's Party receiving the most votes. Sixteen independents were elected, of whom nine were thought to be pro-opposition. The pro-government parties and independents lost eight seats.

Voter turnout was only 18%. This was attributed to Bamar nationalists boycotting the election in protest of the diarchy system and the fact the Legislative Council was only advisory to the Governor of Burma.

Party	Seats	+/–
People's Party	40	–5
Independent Party	12	–8
National Parliamentary Organisation	5	New
Others	46	–
Total	103	0
Source: Haruhiro Fukui
