= Nationalist Party (Burma) =

The Nationalist Party (Burmese: အမျိုးသားပါတီ) was a political party in Burma in the 1920s led by U Pu and U Ba Pe.

== History ==
The party was a successor to the 21 Party led by U Ba Pe, which had emerged as the largest in the 1922 elections after winning 28 seats, but had not been able to form a government. The new party called for a reduction in Indian immigration to Burma and Indian landlords to be banned from owning land in Burma.

In the 1925 elections the Nationalist Party won 25 seats; despite being the largest party, it was not able to form a government.

In 1926 or 1927 the party merged with the Home Rule Party and the Swaraj Party to form the People's Party.
