= 1922 Burmese general election =

- 21 November 1922

80 of the 103 seats in the Legislative Council
- Turnout: 6.9%

General elections were held in Burma on 21 November 1922 to elect members of the Legislative Council. They were the first elections in the country's history.

== Electoral system ==
The Legislative Council had 103 members, of which 80 were elected; 58 "non-communal" seats elected by a common roll, and 22 "communal" seats reserved for ethnic minorities (eight for Indians, five for Karens, one European and one Anglo-Indian) and business groups (two for the Burma Chamber of Commerce, and one each for the Burmese Chamber of Commerce, the Chinese Chamber of Commerce, the Indian Chamber of Commerce, the Rangoon Trades Association and Rangoon University). A further 21 seats were appointed by the Governor (a maximum of 14 of which could be government officials) and there were also two ex officio members, the two members of the Executive Council of the Governor.

All citizens over the age of 18 were enfranchised as long as they met certain requirements. Suffrage in the 44 rural constituencies was based on taxation - in Upper Burma voters had to pay household tax, whilst in Lower Burma they had to pay the married rate of capitation tax. This requirement disenfranchised most of the peasantry. In eight towns with urban constituencies the same requirements as for local elections were applied. Of the country's 12 million population, only 1.8 million were eligible to vote, as the Shan States and some border districts were not part of the election. Separate seats were established for Karen, Eurasians and Europeans.

Candidates had to be aged 25 or over.

== Campaign ==
The election was contested by moderates and radical nationalists. Whilst the moderates aimed to change the system from within, the nationalists campaigned for separation from India and home rule. The General Council of Burmese Associations called for a boycott of the election, although one faction formed the 21 Party to contest it.

Candidates were accused of selling out to the British authorities, and voters were intimidated by campaigners calling for a boycott and nationalist monks. Of the 80 elected seats, 24 were uncontested. For the remaining seats there were 162 candidates.

== Results ==
The 21 Party led by U Ba Pe emerged as the largest in the council with 28 of the 58 non-communal seats. The Progressive Party won around 15 seats, and the remaining seats were won by independents. In Rangoon three moderates and one "extremist" were elected. Voter turnout was very low, at just 6.9%.

== Aftermath ==
Following the elections, the Progressive Party gained in strength as several of members representing communal or commercial seats had joined it. Governor Harcourt Butler formed a mixed cabinet, including members of both parties; U Maung Gyee of the 21 Party was appointed Minister for Education, Local Government and Public Health, whilst Joseph Augustus Maung Gyi of the Progressive Party became Minister for Agriculture, Excise Control and Forests. In addition, U Maung Kin was appointed Minister of Home Affairs. The other cabinet members were the Governor and a civil servant as Minister of Financial Affairs.

When U Maung Kin died in 1924 he was replaced by U May Oung, and later in the year Joseph Maung Gyi was made a High Court judge and was replaced by U Pu.
