= Home Rule Party (Burma) =

Defunct Burmese political party

The Home Rule Party (Burmese: ဟုမ္မရူးပါတီ) was a political party in Burma in the 1920s led by Tharrawaddy U Pu.

== History ==
The party was formed as a breakaway from the General Council of Burmese Associations prior to the 1925 elections due to the GCBA continuing its calls for an electoral boycott. The elections saw the new party win 11 of the 80 seats.

In 1926 or 1927 the party merged with the Nationalist Party and the Swaraj Party to form the People's Party.
