= 1932 Burmese general election =

- 9 November 1932

80 seats in the Legislative Council 45 seats needed for a majority
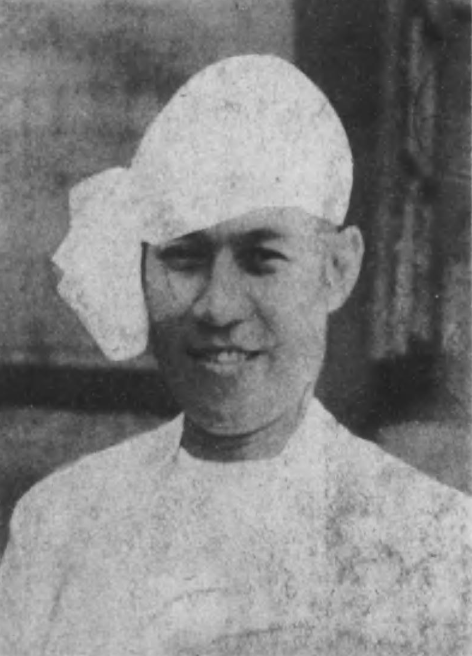

Leader	Ba Maw	U Ba Pe
Alliance	Anti-Separation League	Separation League
Seats won	39	29
Viceroy before election
The Marquess of Linlithgow
Chief Minister
Ba Maw
Anti-Separation League

General elections were held in Burma on 9 November 1932, having originally been planned for 29 October. The election was held almost solely on the issue of whether Burma should separate from India, as the British government had indicated that it would take the outcome of the elections as an indication of Burmese opinion. Prior to the elections many of the major parties joined either the Anti-Separation League or the Separation League.

Despite expectations that the separationists would win, the Anti-Separation League won a majority of seats. However, the anti-separationists were not in favour of maintaining the union with India, but instead called for a better constitution for a separate Burma. They rejected the constitution proposed by the prime minister following the Burma Round-Table Conference, but also rejected the permanent federation with India, and declared they would enter the Indian Federation, but with the right to withdraw.

== Campaign ==
A total of 207 candidates contested the elections; the People's Party headed by U Ba Pe, part of the Separation League, put forward 54, whilst the Independent Party of Joseph Augustus Maung Gyi had 49. Within the Anti-Separation League, the Maw-Myint-Bye Party of Ba Maw and the party led by Chit Hlaing participated in the elections.

The Anti-Separation League was well-funded by Indian commercial interests concerned about potential separation, and was backed by Buddhist monks, who the Separation League sought to ban from politics. By contrast, the Separation League was poorly funded and had little widespread support.

== Results ==
Within the Anti-Separation League the Maw-Myint-Bye Party won the most seats, whilst the People's Party emerged as the largest within the Separation League. The Times noted that the surprise defeat of the separationists was caused by "wild stories" that the country would become a "white man's paradise and home to the British unemployed, that taxation would be heavily increased, even dogs and poultry would be taxed; and that the Buddhist religion would be ruined".

Party	Seats
Anti-Separation League	42
Separation League	29
Neutrals	9
Total	80
Source: Haruhiro Fukui
