= Joseph Augustus Maung Gyi =

Sir Joseph Augustus Maung Gyi
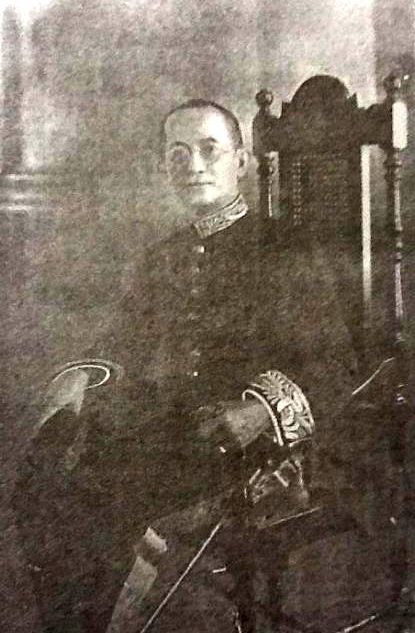

Minister of Forestry of British Burma
- In office 1921–1922

Minister for Education and Public Health of British Burma
- In office 1925–1926

Minister of Home Affairs of British Burma
- In office 1926–1930
- Preceded by: May Oung

Governor of British Burma Acting
- In office 1930–1931
- Preceded by: Charles Alexander Innes
- Succeeded by: Charles Alexander Innes

Personal details
- Born: Maung Gyi; 12 December 1871 Moulmein, British Burma
- Died: 9 March 1955 (aged 83) Rangoon, Burma
- Spouse: Phwar May
- Children: Khin Myint
- Parent(s): U Khin (father); Daw Yin
- Education: Rangoon College; Oxford University
- Occupation: Barrister, Political figure, Administrator, Minister, Diplomat

Sir Joseph Augustus Maung Gyi (Burmese: ဆာ ဂျိုးဇက် အော်ဂပ်စတပ် မောင်ကြီး; 12 December 1871 – 9 March 1955) was a Burmese barrister, judge, politician and administrator who served as the Acting Governor of British Burma during the tenure of Charles Alexander Innes, who was away on sick leave in the United Kingdom. He was the first Burmese governor during the British colonial period. At various other times during the colonial era he served as Minister of Agriculture, Excise and Forestry, of Home Affairs, and as Minister for Transferred Subjects.

He should not be confused with Sir (M. A.) Maung Gyee, with whom his career overlapped.

== Early life and education ==
Maung Gyi was born on 12 December 1871 in Moulmein, British Burma to ethnic Mon parents U Khin and his wife Daw Yin. After graduating from St. Paul's English High School, he studied law at Rangoon College, and continued his education in England. He was also educated at Oxford University, Brussels College and St. Mary's College in the UK. In 1901, he returned to Burma and worked as a barrister for 11 years. In 1911 he was called to the bar by the Middle Temple.

== Life ==
- In January 1923, he became Minister in charge of Agriculture, Excise and the Forest Departments of Burma.
- In November 1924, he was appointed judge at the High Court in Rangoon.
- In July 1926, he became a Member of the Executive Council of the Governor of Burma, and later was appointed Minister of Home Affairs.
- In January 1927, he was made Knight Bachelor in the 1927 New Year Honours.
- In August 1930, he was the 'acting' Governor of Burma during the tenure of Charles Alexander Innes, who was away on sick leave in the UK during the rebellion of Saya San.
- In May 1932, he was reappointed Minister of Forestry.
- In October 1932, he became a member of the Legislative Council of Burma.
- In January 1933, he became the Minister for Transferred Subjects.
- In August 1940, he became the President of the Senate of Burma.

== Personal life and death ==
Maung Gyi married Phwar May who lived in Lampang, Thailand. They had only one daughter Khin Myint. He died on 9 March 1955 at the age of 83 at his residence in Golden Valley, Rangoon, Burma.
