= Jonathan Woodhouse =

English actor, director and producer

- Born: 1987 (age 38–39); London, England
- Occupations: Actor, director, producer

Jonathan Woodhouse (born 1987) is an English actor, director and producer.

Woodhouse was born in London and attended school and college in the London Borough of Newham. He is of English and Filipino descent. He studied for a Master of Arts in Theatre at Royal Holloway, University of London before founding Encompass Productions, an artistic production company. He directed and produced Encompass' first major project 'What It Feels Like', a new play that premiered at the 2011 Edinburgh Fringe festival to critical acclaim. His first major acting role was in the film The Lady directed by Luc Besson, playing 'Alexander Aris', the eldest son of Burmese opposition leader Aung San Suu Kyi (played by Michelle Yeoh) and Michael Aris (David Thewlis). He is currently working in London on a number of theatre and short film projects.

== Filmography ==
=== Film ===
Year	Title	Role	Notes
2011	The Lady	Alexander Aris	
2012	Stormin' Norman	Producer	Also Second Assistant Director and featured on the score on drums
2013	Theory	Brad	Also Executive Producer
2015	The Vigilante	Jones	

== Theatre ==
Year	Title	Role	Notes
2011	What It Feels Like	Director & Producer	Written by Thomas Mayo. Performed at the New Wimbledon Theatre and C venues
2013	Who Is Moloch?	Producer/Private Ike Broughton	Written by Pamela Carralero. Performed at the Visual Collective, Bethnal Green
2013	Life in a Sketchbook	Director/Producer/Candidate	Written by Emma Minihan. Performed at the Top Secret Comedy Club, Covent Garden
2014	Bare Essentials	Director & Producer	Written by various. Performed at the Top Secret Comedy Club Covent Garden, The Savoy Tup Strand, London and The Take Courage Theatre New Cross
