= The Lady (2011 film) =

2011 film by Luc Besson

- French theatrical poster
- Directed by: Luc Besson
- Written by: Rebecca Frayn
- Produced by: Virginie Besson-Silla; Andy Harries; Jean Todt
- Starring: Michelle Yeoh; David Thewlis; Jonathan Woodhouse; Jonathan Raggett
- Cinematography: Thierry Arbogast
- Edited by: Julien Rey
- Music by: Éric Serra; Sade
- Production companies: EuropaCorp; Left Bank Pictures; France 2 Cinéma
- Distributed by: Entertainment Film Distributors
- Release dates: 12 September 2011 (TIFF); 30 December 2011 (UK)
- Running time: 135 minutes
- Countries: United Kingdom; France
- Languages: English; Burmese
- Budget: €22.1 million
- Box office: $7.8 million

The Lady is a 2011 British biographical film directed by Luc Besson, starring Michelle Yeoh as Aung San Suu Kyi and David Thewlis as her late husband Michael Aris. Yeoh called the film "a labour of love" but also confessed it had felt intimidating for her to play the Nobel laureate.

== Plot ==
In 1947, a young Aung San Suu Kyi spends time with her father Aung San, who led Burma to independence. Soon afterwards, he, along with a group of colleagues, is assassinated by armed men in uniform.

In 1988, Aung San Suu Kyi, now happily married with family in England, returns to Burma to see her ill mother, finding that her father is still widely remembered. Upon visiting her mother in hospital, she meets injured patients from the Tatmadaw's crackdown in the 8888 Uprising. She realises that political change is needed in Burma and is drawn into the reform movement. She then accepts the role of icon in support of democracy by the Burmese people and devotes herself to activities in support of greater political freedoms.

Aung San Suu Kyi establishes the National League for Democracy and wins the 1990 elections. However, the Burmese military refuses to accept the results and moves to rein in Aung San Suu Kyi. She and her family are separated when her husband and children were banned from Burma and she is put under a house arrest for more than a decade. Her husband Michael Aris keeps up a relentless struggle for Aung San Suu Kyi's recognition outside Burma. Due to their efforts, she receives the Nobel Peace Prize. As Aung San Suu Kyi cannot attend the ceremony, her family accepts the prize on her behalf. The military later offers Aung San Suu Kyi a chance to see her dying husband but she refuses, knowing that she will not be allowed to return to Burma. After grieving her husband's death, she continues her political work, appearing to supporters from behind her gate while still under house arrest.

== Cast ==
- Michelle Yeoh as Aung San Suu Kyi, Burmese housewife turned activist
  - Soraya La-ong Ake as two-year-old Aung San Suu Kyi
- David Thewlis as Michael Aris, husband of Aung San Suu Kyi
- Jonathan Raggett as Kim Aris, Aung San Suu Kyi's younger son
- Jonathan Woodhouse as Alexander Aris, Aung San Suu Kyi's elder son
- Susan Wooldridge as Lucinda Philips
- Benedict Wong as Karma Phuntsho, a Bhutanese student of Michael Aris
- Htun Lin as Ne Win, dictator of Burma from 1962 to 1988
- Kriang Kunsri as Saw Maung, dictator of Burma from 1988 to 1992
- Agge Poechit as Than Shwe, dictator of Burma from 1992 to 2011
- Donatienne Dupont as Marie-Laure Aris
- Phone Zaw as Aung San, Aung San Suu Kyi's father and the father of modern Burma
- Marian Yu as Khin Kyi, Aung San Suu Kyi's mother
  - Prapimporn Kanjunda as 30-year-old Khin Kyi
- May as Mon Mon, the housekeeper for Aung San Suu Kyi's family
- Ko Ko Win Aung as the Red Scarf Captain
- Thein Win as Kyi Maung
- Tun Tun as Sein Lwin
- Ilario Bisi-Pedro as Desmond Tutu
- Maung Maung Khin as Captain Myint
- William Hope as James Baker
- Win Kyaw Tun as Major Danubyu

== Background ==
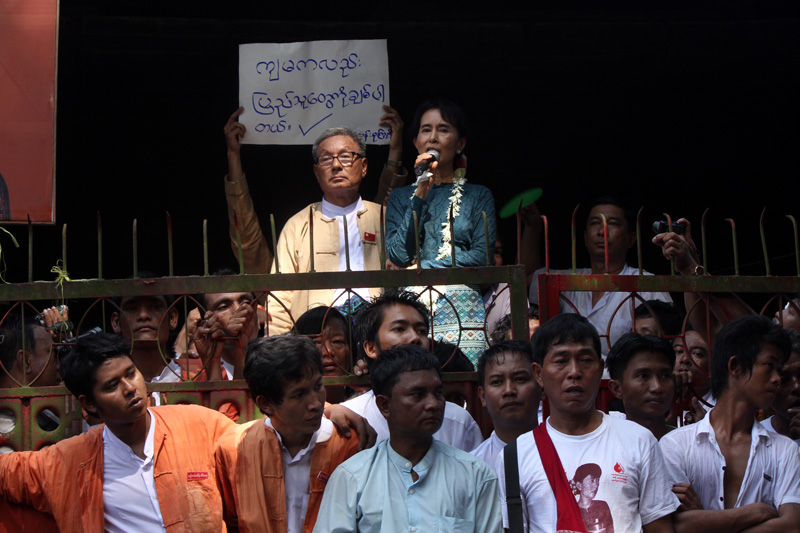
Aung San Suu Kyi appears in public after her release on 14 November 2010

Rebecca Frayn began working on the project after she and her husband, producer Andy Harries, had visited Burma in the early 1990s. Harries' production company Left Bank Pictures began development of the script in 2008. Harries wanted Michelle Yeoh as the lead and had the script sent to her. The actress was thrilled because she had always wanted to play Suu Kyi. She visited London to meet the couple. The script was as British as its origin, telling the story solely from Michael Aris' perspective but Michelle Yeoh claimed she brought an Asian insight to it. Her husband Jean Todt (who later also accompanied the project as accredited producer) encouraged her to contact his fellow countryman and friend Luc Besson. Besson accepted the script immediately as an opportunity for him to finally present a real life heroine, a female fighter who wields no other weapons than her human virtues.

During the shooting of the film, news broke that Aung San Suu Kyi's house arrest had been lifted. Luc Besson hesitated to believe what he saw on TV because it looked so much like his recent footage. Yeoh visited Suu Kyi soon afterwards. She would say later it had been like visiting a dear family member. When they discussed the film the actress got the feeling she was still on the film set because Luc Besson had recreated the house so accurately. Aung San Suu Kyi even gave her a hug. On 22 June 2011 Yeoh wanted to visit Suu Kyi a second time but was deported from Burma, reportedly over her portrayal of Aung San Suu Kyi. This time Besson was allowed to meet Suu Kyi. Suu Kyi said she would hesitate to watch the film because she was not too sure whether she was up to it, although she asked for a copy.

== Authenticity ==
Writer Rebecca Frayn interviewed a number of Suu Kyi's confidants and based her screenplay on the testimonies. Some supporters provided Frayn information only because she wouldn't disclose these sources, and her work was openly appreciated by Suu Kyi's brother-in-law Anthony Aris.

To portray Suu Kyi, Michelle Yeoh watched about two hundred hours of audiovisual material on Suu Kyi and took lessons in Burmese. Her talent for languages is evident when she delivers Suu Kyi's historic speeches in Burmese. The actress had refreshed her skills as a piano player. Despite always having been petite, Michelle Yeoh evidently lost weight to embody Suu Kyi whose son had stressed that his mother was slimmer than Yeoh.

Luc Besson stated later Michelle Yeoh "had perfected Suu Kyi's appearance and the nuances of her personality to such an extent that the lines between the real human being and the portrayed character blurred when they crossed in real life".

To achieve authenticity Luc Besson engaged many Burmese actors and extras. Some of them, like Thein Win, re-enacted their personal memories. Once or twice the filming of a scene had to stop because Michelle Yeoh's performance of a speech (in Burmese) elicited outbursts of emotion among extras who had originally heard Suu Kyi.

Co-producer Andy Harries concentrated on substantiating the British part of his wife's script. He achieved authenticity of the happy time in Suu Kyi's life, when she lived with her family in the United Kingdom. Their flat was also recreated on a sound stage, although the film includes scenes shot on location in front of the house itself. The scenes showing Michael Aris as a dying cancer patient were also shot on location in the actual hospital.

== Distribution ==
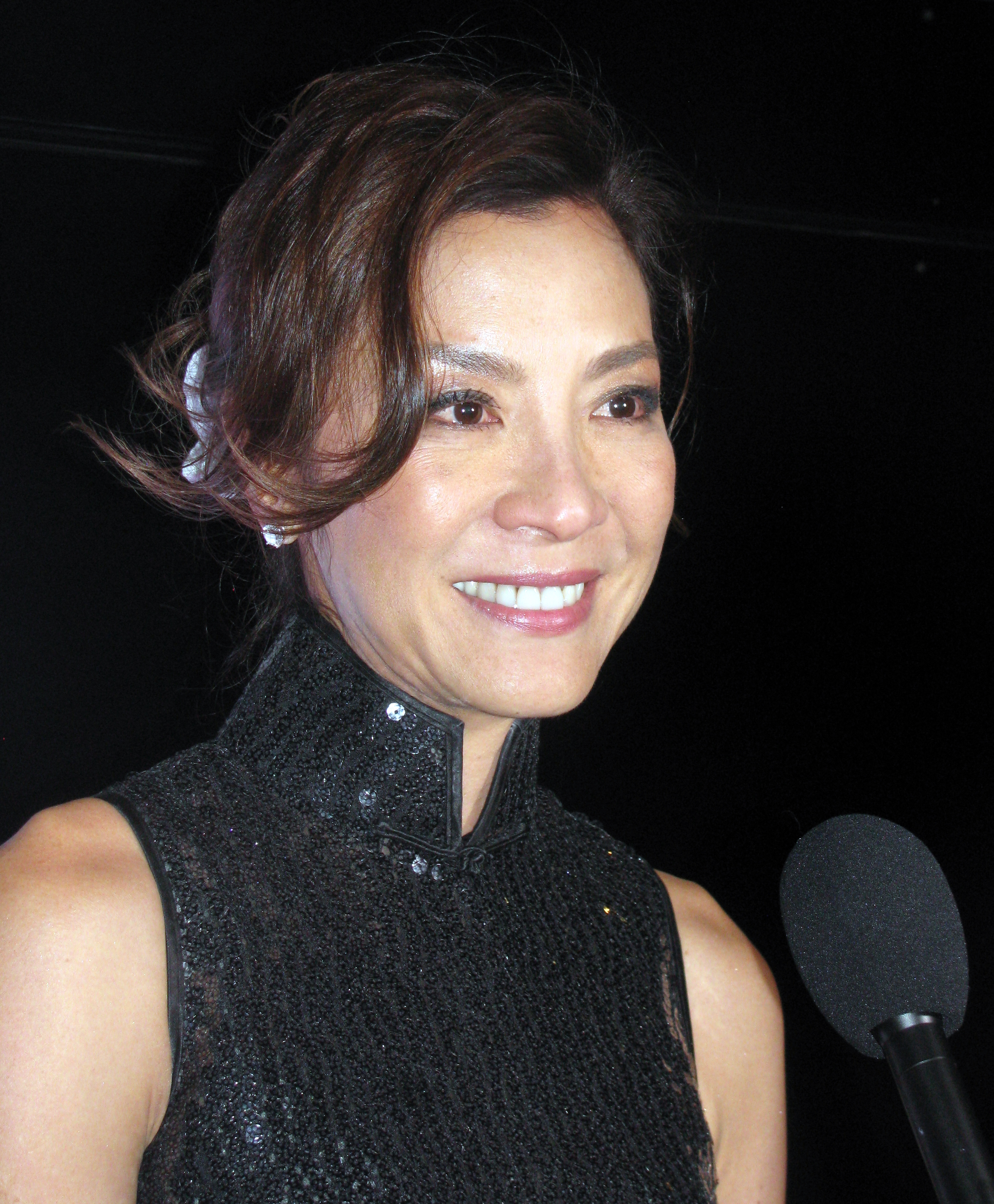
Michelle Yeoh presenting The Lady at the Toronto International Film Festival in 2011

The Lady had its world premiere on 12 September 2011 at the 36th Toronto International Film Festival. On 29 October 2011 it was shown as closer at the Doha Tribeca Film Festival. Cohen Media Group, the US distributor of the film, had a one-week limited Academy Engagement theatrical run in Los Angeles during 2–8 December 2011. Moreover, there was an exclusive screening at the Asia Society in New York. Mongrel Media released the film in Canada on 6 April 2012.

The European premiere took place when the film served as opening film of the Rome Film Festival on 27 October 2011. In the UK The Lady was distributed by Entertainment Film Distributors. It was distributed by EuropaCorp throughout Continental Europe. In Germany's cinemas the film opened on 15 March.

In Asia The Lady was closer of the International Hua Hin Film Festival where Michelle Yeoh declared she planned on visiting Burma again. The screening had such a packed house that eventually a second screen was provided. On 2 February 2012 the film was released in Thailand and Singapore. On 3 February it had its premiere in Hong Kong, followed by a theatrical release on 9 February. In Burma, a great number of pirated versions are distributed privately.

== Reception ==
The film received mixed reviews, generally negative in the west, but stronger in the east. English critics often appreciated the efforts of the leading actress, Michelle Yeoh, and the performance of English actor David Thewlis while criticising director/producer Luc Besson. American critics joined the criticism of Luc Besson. In Asia, the reception was more positive.

- Review aggregator Rotten Tomatoes reports an approval rating of 36% based on 72 reviews, with an average score of 5.16/10. The critical consensus reads, "Even as The Lady focuses on Aung San Suu Kyi's romantic life parallel to her political ascendancy, Luc Besson's saccharine direction is too concerned with deifying the Nobel Prize-winner for her humanity to actually shine through."

United States

- Roger Ebert gave it two and a half stars, citing the strength of Michelle Yeoh and David Thewlis' performances but suggesting that Besson should have stayed away from the biopic genre.
- Keith Uhlich (Time Out Chicago) described The Lady as a dutifully crafted biopic.
- David Rooney (The Hollywood Reporter) praised Thierry Arbogast's cinematography for "boast(ing) handsome visuals, the South Asian landscapes nicely contrasted with the grey stone structures of Oxford."
- Asian Week's Annabelle Udo O'Malley evaluated the film as "certainly worth seeing" for its "beautiful cinematography" and its soundtrack.
- Summer J. Holliday (Working Author) said the film was "a synergy of the harsh reality of modern military occupation and the effect it has on parties of either side".
- Melissa Silverstein – (indieWire) described "Michael's campaign to get Suu the Nobel Peace Prize to raise her visibility and protect her safety" as one of the film's highlights. She emphasised hereby the scene "of one of her sons accepting the award on her behalf as she listens to ceremony on a radio thousands of miles away". She found that scene "moving".

United Kingdom

- Robbie Collin of The Daily Telegraph called the biopic, 'a pale imitation of an inspirational fighter for democracy.'
- Alex von Tunzelmann (The Guardian) criticised historicity, saying that "accounts of the assassination specifically mention that Aung San was seated and did not even have time to stand before the squad fired 13 bullets into him".

Australia / Indonesia / Hong Kong

- David Stratton (Australian Broadcasting Corporation) said Suu was "beautifully played by Michelle Yeoh... the epitome of grace and calm".
- Julia Suryakusuma (The Jakarta Post) said she had cried while watching the film.
- The University of Hong Kong said that "the movie provides a context for us to explore the issues of democracy and freedom and the related issues of humanities" when they announced a screening, inviting Luc Besson, Michelle Yeoh, and Professor Ian Holliday to a post-viewing discussion.

US Secretary of State Hillary Clinton watched The Lady before she met the real Aung San Suu Kyi.

== See also ==
- Burma VJ
