= Raggett =

Raggett is a surname. Notable people with the surname include:

- Dave Raggett (born 1955), English computer specialist
- Jonathan Raggett (born 1992), English actor
- Margot Raggett, British wildlife photographer
- Matthew Raggett (born 1972), educator, writer, and school headmaster
- Sean Raggett (born 1994), English footballer
