= Tin Myo Win =

Tin Myo Win FRCS
- တင်မျိုးဝင်း
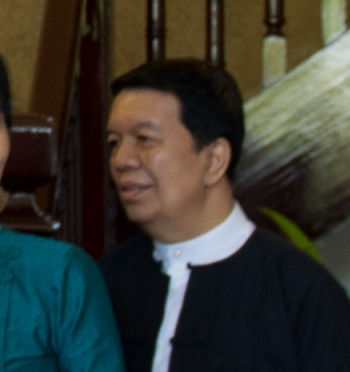

Chief Surgeon of Muslim Free Hospital, Yangon

Personal details
- Born: c. 1951 (age 74–75)
- Party: National League for Democracy
- Education: Institute of Medicine 1, Rangoon (MBBS, M.Med.Sc.); Royal College of Surgeons of Edinburgh (FRCS)
- Occupation: Surgeon
- Known for: Personal physician of Aung San Suu Kyi

Tin Myo Win FRCS (Burmese: တင်မျိုးဝင်း; [tɪ̀ɴ mjó wɪɴ] born: c. 1951) is a Burmese physician, former political prisoner and long-time personal physician of Burmese politician Aung San Suu Kyi.

== Personal life and political career ==
Tin Myo Win taught surgery at Rangoon General Hospital before the 1988 uprising. He spent three years in prison after taking part in the 1988 uprising. He has worked as a surgeon at the Muslim Free Hospital in Yangon since his release in 1992. He is the long-time personal physician of Aung San Suu Kyi and one of the few people permitted to regularly visit her house during her years under house arrest. He was detained for two weeks during the 2009 Suu Kyi trespasser incidents.

Tin Myo Win has helped shape National League for Democracy's policies on healthcare. He is also a member of the Yangon General Hospital fund-raising committee to upgrade the hospital.

Tin Myo Win was mentioned as a possible presidential pick after 2015 election as Aung San Suu Kyi was constitutionally barred from the presidency.

In the wake of the 2021 Myanmar coup d'état on 1 February, Tin Myo Win was detained by the Myanmar Armed Forces.
