= 54 University Avenue =

- Burmese: ၅၄၊ တက္ကသိုလ်ရိပ်သာလမ်း
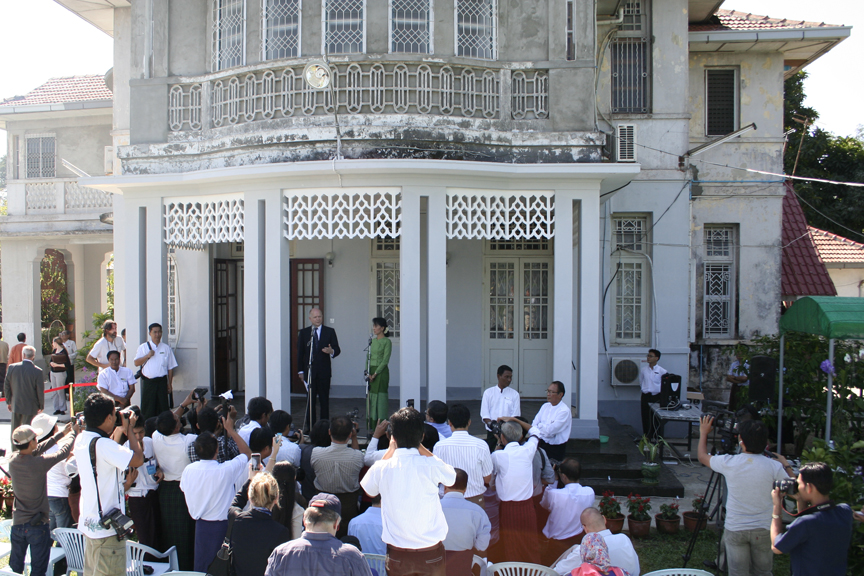
- Press conference on north lawn of the house in 2012
- Interactive map of the 54 University Avenue area

General information
- Location: 54, University Avenue Road, Bahan Township, Yangon, Myanmar
- Coordinates: 16°49′32.88″N 96°9′1.8″E
- Current tenants: Aung San Suu Kyi (State Counsellor of Myanmar)
- Completed: before 1948

Technical details
- Grounds: 0.6 hectares (1.5 acres)

54 University Avenue is a house in Bahan Township, Yangon. It is the residence of Aung San Suu Kyi, a Burmese politician and former State Counsellor of Myanmar. The house is situated on the University Avenue Road, adjacent to Inya Lake.

== History ==
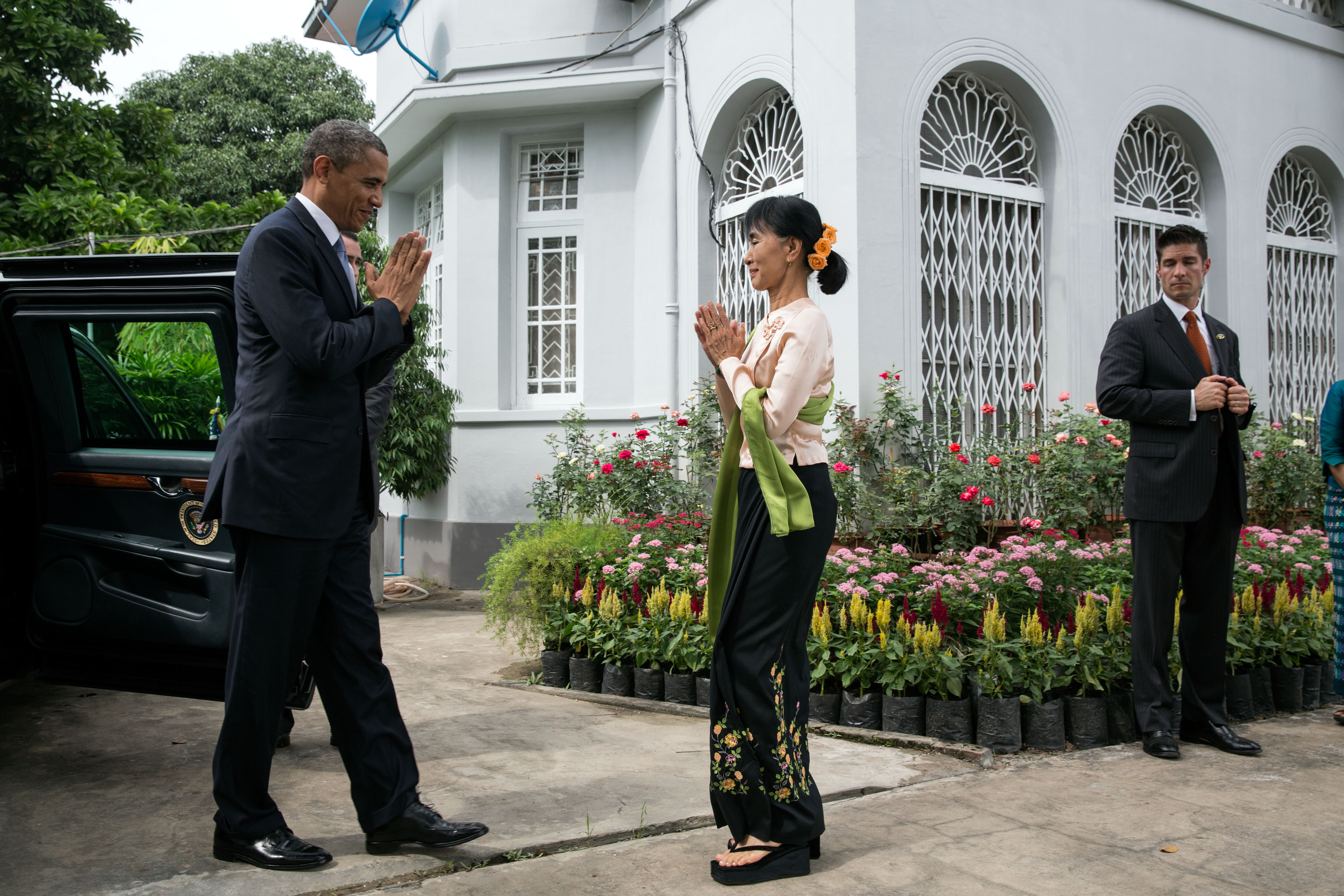
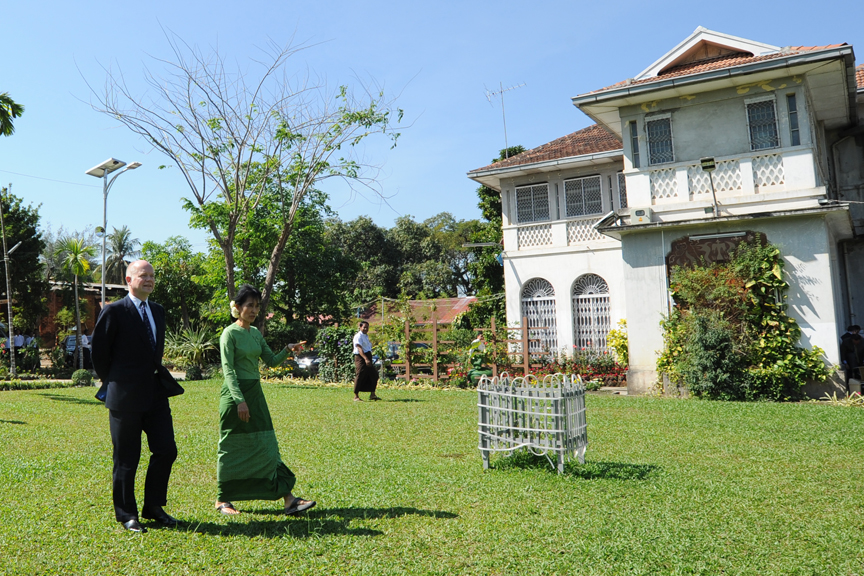
Aung San Suu Kyi welcoming U.S. President Barack Obama (left) and British Foreign Secretary William Hague (right) to 54 University Avenue.

In 1953, following the death of her elder brother, Aung San Suu Kyi, her mother Khin Kyi and her eldest brother Aung San Oo moved from their house on Tower Lane (now Bogyoke Aung San Museum) near Kandawgyi Lake, to this colonial-era villa facing Inya Lake, on University Avenue Road. The house sits on a .6-hectare (1.5-acre) lot.

== Political significance ==
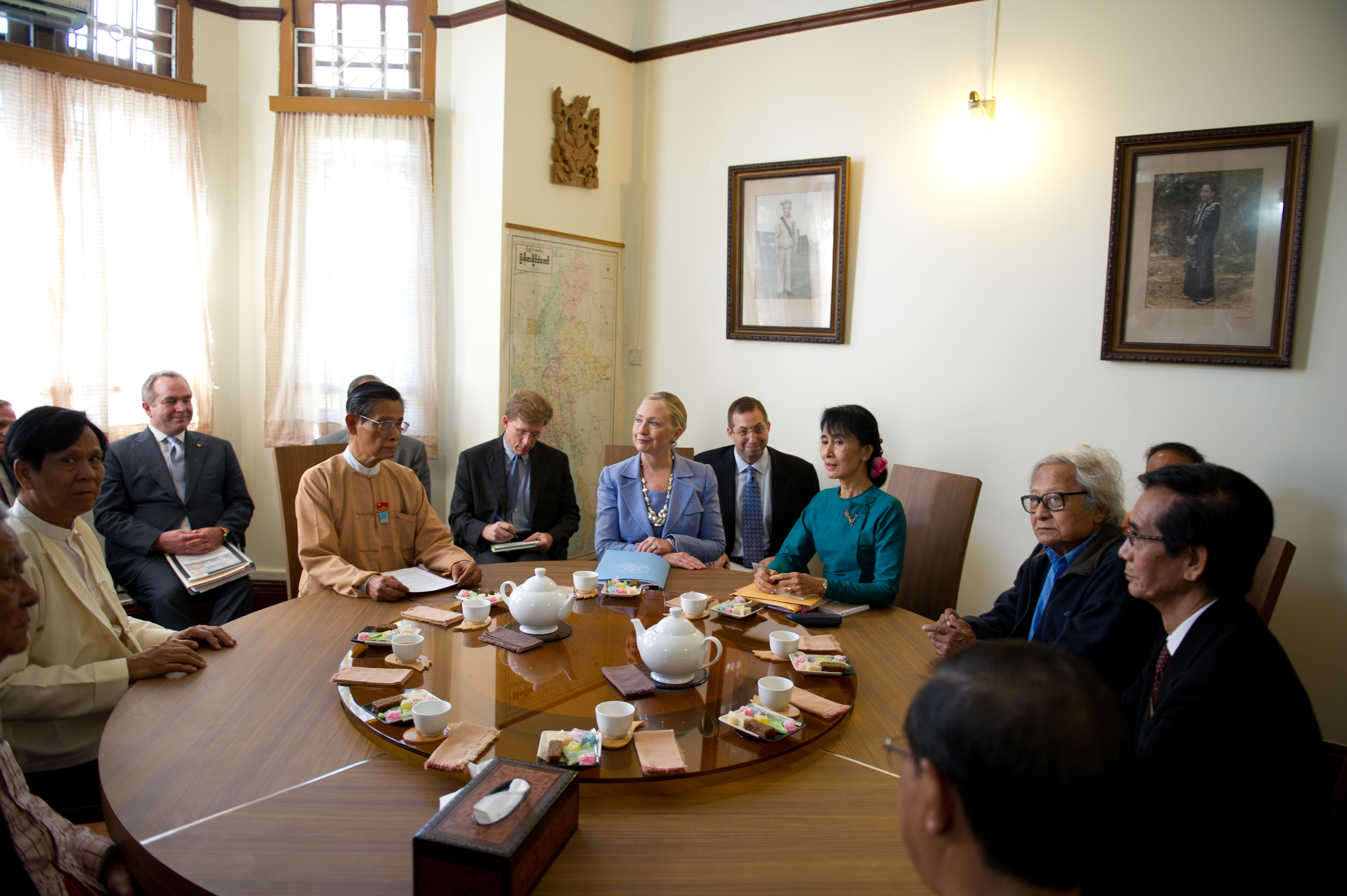
A meeting in the dining room (Clicking on a person will take you to their article.)

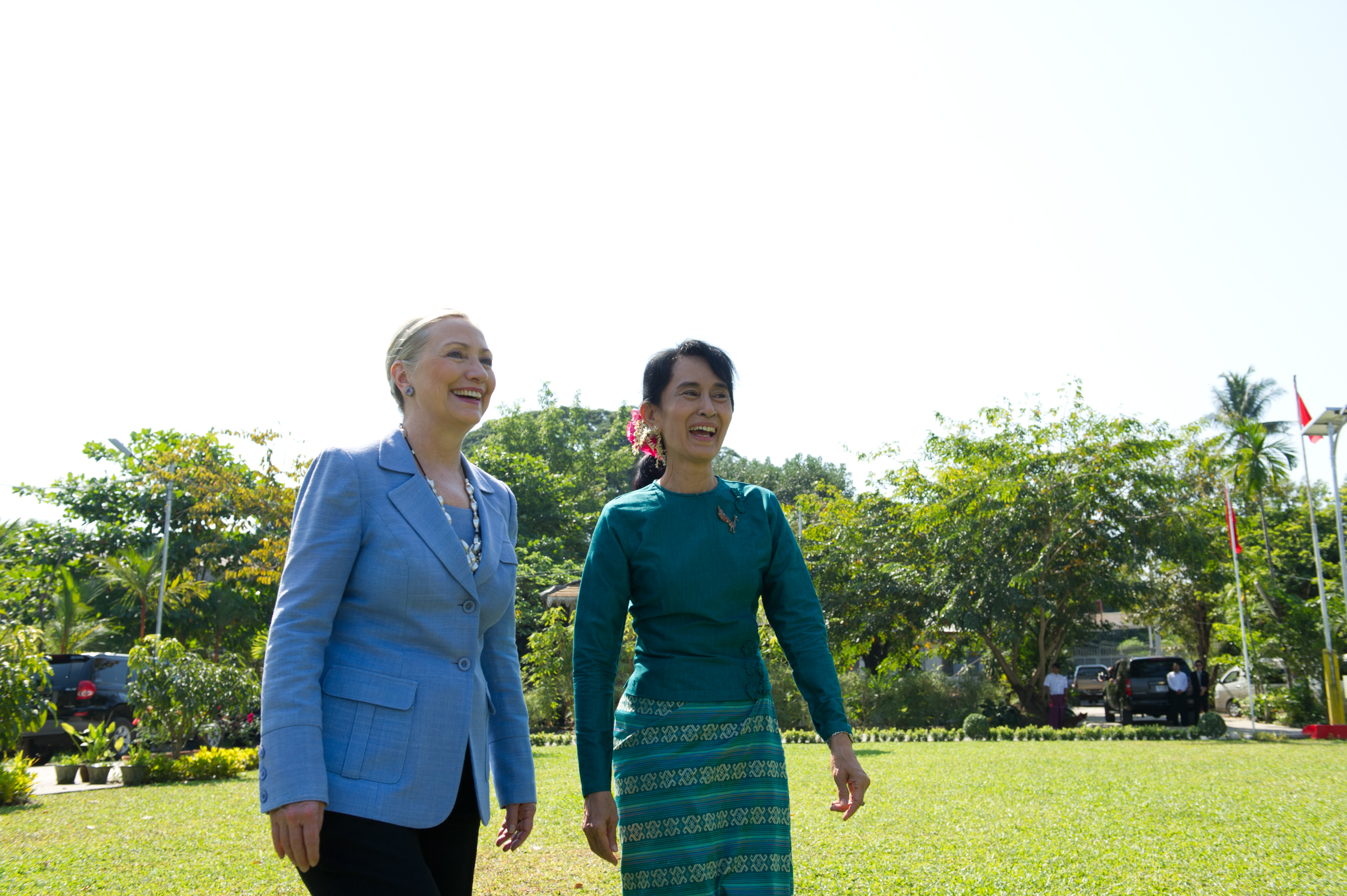
U.S. Secretary of State Hillary Clinton and Aung San Suu Kyi on the east lawn in 2011

Aung San Suu Kyi met people of various backgrounds, political views and religions in the house during 1988 uprisings. She remained under house arrest for almost 15 of the 21 years from 1989 to 2010 in the house.

On 22 September 2007, although still under house arrest, Aung San Suu Kyi made a brief public appearance at the gate of the house to accept the blessings of Buddhist monks during the Saffron revolution.

On 2 May 2008, after the Cyclone Nargis, the roof of the house was damaged and Aung San Suu Kyi lived in virtual darkness after losing electricity. She used candles at night as she was not provided any generator set. The house was renovated in August 2009.

On 4 May 2009, an American citizen John Yettaw trespassed the house two weeks before her scheduled release from house arrest on 27 May. It is illegal in Myanmar to have a guest stay overnight at one's home without notifying the authorities first. This illegal visit prompted Aung San Suu Kyi's arrest on 13 May 2009 and sentenced to eighteen months of house arrest, which effectively meant that she was unable to participate in the 2010 elections.

On 13 November 2010, she waved from behind the gate of the house to her supporters who rushed to the house when nearby barricades were removed by the security forces, celebrating the end of her house arrest.

== Ownership lawsuit ==
In 2000, Aung San Oo brought legal action against Aung San Suu Kyi in the Yangon High Court demanding a half-share of the house. There was widespread speculation among observers at the time that Aung San Oo would then sell his half-share to the ruling State Peace and Development Council junta, but the High Court ruled against him, much to the surprise of the same observers, who had assumed that it would bring down whatever verdict was preferred by the junta. Time magazine reported that, according to Burmese exiles and observers in Yangon, the junta used the alleged surrogacy of Aung San Oo and his lawsuit as an act of spite against her.

In 2016, the Western Yangon District Court ordered the property to be equally divided between Aung San Oo and Aung San Suu Kyi. However, the former considered the decision unfair and appealed unsuccessfully multiple times to have the property auctioned off and the proceeds split between him and Suu Kyi. Following the military coup that ousted the government of Aung San Suu Kyi in 2021, the Supreme Court of Myanmar heard a special appeal from Aung San Oo and decided in 2022 to have the property auctioned off, which was confirmed by a district court in Yangon to begin on 20 March 2024. A legal official said that the property is valued at around 315 billion kyats ($90 million).

In response to these threats, Duwa Lashi La, the acting president of the rival National Unity Government of Myanmar, designated the property as a cultural heritage site in 2022 and prohibited its sale or destruction, under threat of eventual legal punishment.

The auction of the house proceeded on 20 March 2024 in front of its gates, but ended without any bids. A second auction on 15 August also ended without any bids despite the minimum sale price being reduced to 300 billion kyats ($142 million). A third auction on 5 February 2025 also ended without any bids despite the minimum sale price being reduced further to 297 billion kyats ($141 million).

== Portrayal in film ==
The house was featured in Luc Besson's 2011 film The Lady. Under director Luc Besson's helm, his crew also pursued accuracy. Even the cardinal directions were respected when the house was rebuilt, so that the audience would see the sunrise in the same way, based on satellite images and about 200 family photographs, they constructed a precise 1:1 scale model of this house.
