= Strangers From Within =

Strangers From Within may refer to:

- Strangers From Within, the original unpublished title of William Golding's novel Lord of the Flies
- "The Stranger From Within", a track on the album Actual Fantasy
- Strangers Within, a British horror movie
- The Stranger Within (1974 film), an American made-for-television science fiction horror film
- The Stranger Within (1990 film), an American made-for-television thriller film
