= Aung San Oo =

Burmese-American engineer (born 1943)

- အောင်ဆန်းဦး
- Born: 1943 (age 82–83)
- Occupation: Engineer
- Spouse: Lei Lei Nwe Thein
- Parent(s): Aung San; Khin Kyi
- Relatives: Aung San Suu Kyi (sister); Aung San Lin (brother); Aung San Chit (sister); Alexander Aris (nephew); Kim Aris (nephew); Ba Win (uncle); Sein Win (cousin)

Aung San Oo (Burmese: အောင်ဆန်းဦး, born in 1943) is a Burmese American engineer who is the elder brother of politician and Nobel Peace Prize winner Aung San Suu Kyi; the two are the only surviving children of Burmese independence leader Aung San.

== Life ==
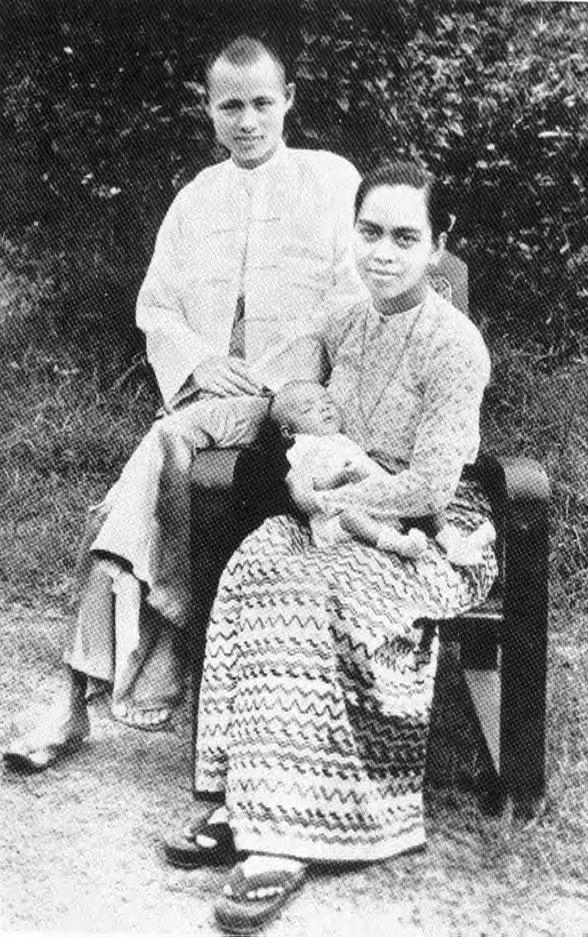
Aung San Oo as an infant

Aung San Oo was born in 1943. He was educated in England, attended University College London and graduated with bachelor's and master's degrees in electrical engineering. He immigrated to the United States in 1973, becoming an American citizen.

Aung San Oo has been described by the Burmese Lawyers' Council and the National Coalition Government of the Union of Burma as a potential surrogate of the junta in an attempt to humiliate Aung San Suu Kyi and place her in an untenable position. Time magazine reports that, according to Burmese exiles and observers in Rangoon, the junta used the alleged surrogacy of Aung San Oo and his lawsuit as an act of spite against the National League for Democracy leader.

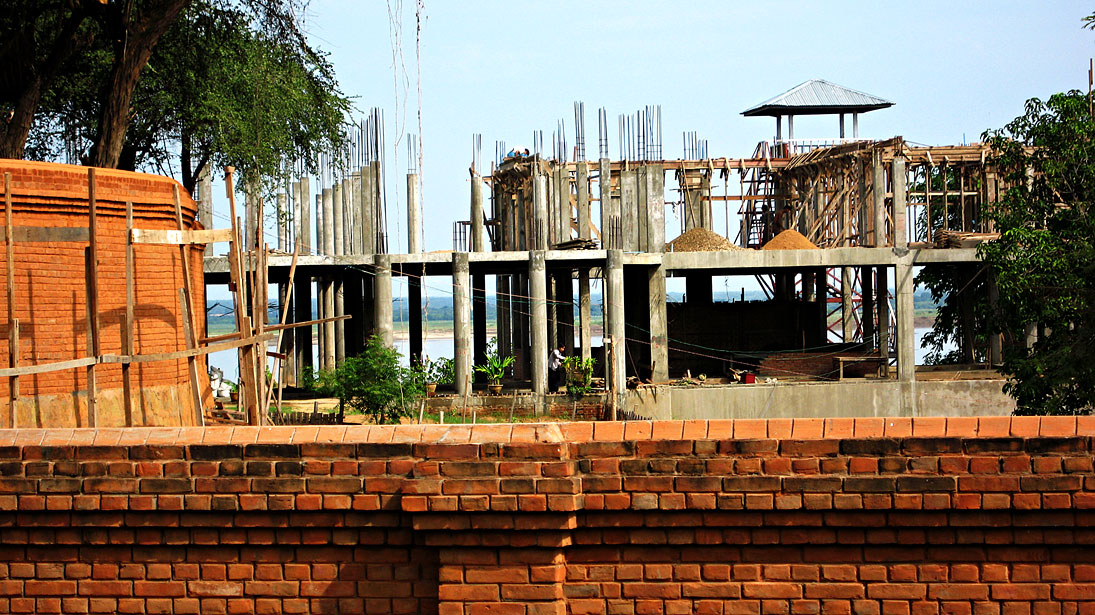
Aung San Oo's mansion in Bagan, 2007

In 2005, Aung San Oo initiated the construction of a large mansion in Bagan. Being a U.S. citizen, he is legally unable to own property in Myanmar – a point that led to the Rangoon High Court dismissing his claim for a half-share in a house in Rangoon. Nevertheless, it is understood that his wife's family is serving as a proxy on his behalf.

When Aung San Suu Kyi came to power in 2015, Aung San Oo started his personal website and began attacking Suu Kyi's government. On 8 October 2020, the NLD government banned Aung San Oo's website due to the spread of fake news.

== Litigation ==
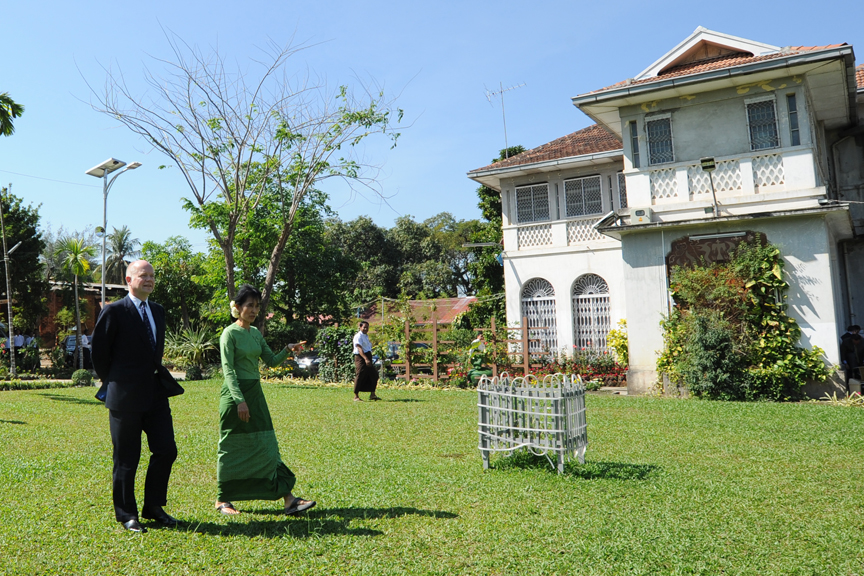
Disputed family house 54 University Avenue.

Aung San Oo is estranged from his sister; while Suu Kyi became the leader of the Burmese National League for Democracy party, Oo is close to the ruling military junta. In 2000, Oo brought legal action against Suu Kyi in the Rangoon High Court demanding a half-share in the family home, where she was held under intermittent house arrest from 1989 to 2010. There was widespread speculation at the time that Aung San Oo would then sell his half-share to the junta, but the High Court ruled against Oo. The Burmese Lawyers' Council describes the lawsuit as an attempt by the junta to publicly humiliate the leader of the National League for Democracy. The Burmese Government in exile claims that had Aung San Oo won his case, he would have put Aung San Suu Kyi in an extremely precarious position. In the Time article it is also reported that the junta may have used this legal manoeuvre to "back Aung San Suu Kyi into a corner", despite advice to the contrary by the visiting former Japanese Prime Minister Ryutaro Hashimoto the year before the lawsuit.

In 2016, the Western Yangon District Court ordered the property to be equally divided between Aung San Oo and Aung San Suu Kyi. However, the former considered the decision unfair and appealed unsuccessfully multiple times to have the property auctioned off and the proceeds split between him and Suu Kyi. Following the military coup that ousted the government of Aung San Suu Kyi in 2021, the Supreme Court of Myanmar heard a special appeal from Aung San Oo and decided in 2022 to have the property auctioned off, which was confirmed by a district court in Yangon to begin on 20 March 2024. A legal official said that the property is valued at around 315 billion kyats ($90 million). As of April 2025, all auction attempts drew no bidders.

== Personal life ==
Aung San Oo is married to Lei Lei Nwe Thein (also spelled Leilei Nwe Thein), an American citizen of mixed Mon-Chinese descent from Mawlamyaing.
