= Aung San Suu Kyi trespasser incidents =

Suu Kyi trespasser incidents
- Self-portraiture on camera in Yettaw's possession at the time of his arrest: shown attached to Yettaw's sandals are homemade swimfins fashioned of heavy paperboard
- Date: 4 May 2009
- Location: Lake Inya Residence at 54 University Avenue, Yangon, Myanmar, where Aung San Suu Kyi was being held under house arrest
- Participants: John Yettaw
- Outcome: Arrests of Yettaw, Suu Kyi and her two housekeepers Khin Khin Win and Win Ma Ma on 6 May 2009; Suu Kyi's sentence: 18 months house arrest Khin Khin Win and Win Ma Ma sentences: identical with Suu Kyi's; Yettaw's sentence: 7 years imprisonment, 4 of which accompanied by hard labor. (Yettaw's sentence was subsequently commuted to three and a half years, which itself was suspended upon his deportation from Myanmar on August 16, 2009.)

On May 4, 2009, American John Yettaw (1955 – 2021) trespassed upon the residence of Myanmar political prisoner Aung San Suu Kyi, two weeks before her scheduled release from house arrest on May 27. This illegal visit prompted Suu Kyi's arrest on May 13, 2009. Yettaw himself was arrested by Myanmar authorities on May 6. He was charged on May 14 with illegally entering a restricted zone, illegal swimming, and breaking immigration laws. It is illegal in Myanmar to have a guest stay overnight at one's home without notifying the authorities first.

Their trial began on May 18, 2009. On August 11, Yettaw was sentenced on three counts totaling seven years, including four years of hard labor. Suu Kyi was sentenced to eighteen months of house arrest. On August 14, US Senator Jim Webb arrived in Burma and successfully negotiated Yettaw's release and August 16 deportation.

Myanmar authorities asserted that Yettaw's visits were instigated by opposition groups as part of efforts to pressure and embarrass the government; however, no evidence of this ever came to light. The Myanmar government disqualified Suu Kyi from participating in the 2010 elections.

== 2008 visit ==
In May 2008, Yettaw and his teenage son had taken a trip to Asia. His son returned home in September to start school, but Yettaw continued on to Mae Sot, Thailand, where he took up residence in a hotel, bought a motorcycle and developed a friendship with a Thai resident. Yettaw developed a deep interest in Aung San Suu Kyi and told people that he had to bring international attention to her situation. He tried unsuccessfully to get work at Thai NGOs. In October, after having a vision that he was a defender of the oppressed, he left Mae Sot without paying any of his bills. On October 27 in Bangkok, he obtained a Myanmar visa. On November 7, he flew to Yangon, Myanmar.

On November 30, Yettaw reached Aung San Suu Kyi's home by swimming across Lake Inya. He entered the property via a culvert on University Avenue Road and Inya Myaing Road. He then made his way over a small fence behind the house, a restricted zone and without communication devices. Myanmar authorities had forbidden Aung San Suu Kyi from having contact with outsiders. His trek was successful despite her residence being surrounded by over a dozen security guards 24 hours a day, and despite the presence of police boats that frequently patrolled local waters. Yettaw was prevented by the house staff from communicating with Aung San Suu Kyi, but he stayed there for a period of longer than two days.

During this initial visit, Yettaw gave her at least six books, including The Book of Mormon, along with a letter written by Yettaw's daughter. This letter was later ripped up by Aung San Suu Kyi. She reported Yettaw's visit to her doctor who alerted authorities. Authorities took no action. He left the property via the same route he arrived. According to Yettaw, upon his departure from her house, police officers apprehended him, aimed guns at him, asked "What are you doing here?", but then let him go.

Unable to fly out of Bangkok, Thailand due to political protests involving the seizure of Suvarnabhumi International Airport, Yettaw laid over at the Highland Hotel in Mae Sot for over a month. There he spoke openly to several people about his failed attempt to see Aung San Suu Kyi and his plans to try again. During this time he frequently visited refugee schools and met the children. He was often seen with a Thai woman. He also visited the Mae Tao Clinic nearly a dozen times, where he communicated with Bo Kyi of the Assistance Association for Political Prisoners.

== 2009 visit and arrest ==
In mid-April 2009, Yettaw travelled from Missouri to California to see an ex-wife. He informed her that he needed to go to Asia to obtain details on a paper he was writing about forgiveness. On April 20, Yettaw flew to Bangkok, leaving his children with various friends. He told his family that he was working on a book and searching for US soldiers missing in action from the Vietnam War. According to Yettaw's wife, he wanted to interview Aung San Suu Kyi about forgiveness and resilience. Soon thereafter, Yettaw visited exiled Burmese groups in Thailand and told them about a faith-based book he was writing on heroism. Yettaw spent a week in Bangkok waiting for his Myanmar visa to clear.

On the evening of May 3, 2009, Yettaw swam a 2-kilometre (1.2 mi) distance across Lake Inya in Yangon to the house where Aung San Suu Kyi was held under house arrest by Burmese authorities. He planned his route across the lake using Google Earth. Some policemen saw him during his swim and threw rocks at him.

Using the same route he used during the 2008 visit, via the culvert, and over a small fence, Yettaw successfully evaded the government security guards and entered her residence at 5 am on May 4. He entered the house by climbing up a drain. Inside, he came upon two female assistants, Khin Khin Win and Win Ma Ma, a mother and daughter, Aung San Suu Kyi's sole sanctioned companions. He informed them that he was tired, hungry and suffered from diabetes. The women fed him. He asked Aung San Suu Kyi if he could stay at the house for a few days. She refused, and her caretakers threatened to turn him in to the authorities, but Aung San Suu Kyi agreed to let him stay on the ground floor after he began to complain about leg cramps. During his stay, they provided him with rehydration salts and meals. Some of his time there he devoted to prayer.

The Myanmar government requires all non-family overnight visitors to be registered and forbids overnight stays by foreigners. According to Aung San Suu Kyi and her assistants, he stayed there as an uninvited, unwelcomed guest. Yettaw's family later stated that he was "well-intentioned" and "unaware of the possible consequences."

Yettaw left the house just before midnight (11:45 pm) on May 4, the same day he arrived, although some accounts allege he left on May 5. He then swam towards the home of the US Counselor, which shares a fence with Kanthaya Hospital. According to Burmese officials, Yettaw left behind "two black chadors, two black scarves, two long skirts, one red torch light, six color pencils in a plastic bag, three pairs of sunglasses, two signal lights, a pair of swimming glasses, one two-pin plug, two pieces of circuit wire, one recharger, a black bag with a zip in it that was used to keep the apparatuses, a plastic bag with a zip in it, two pairs of gray stockings, five parts of an English book, and a bag with pieces of torn paper sheets in it." At 5 AM on May 5, Yettaw was apprehended by police near the International Business Center on the lake's west bank, less than 100 feet from the US counselor's home.

=== Arrest and fallout ===
Originally scheduled to return to the United States June 24, Yettaw was arrested May 6 and taken to Insein prison; on May 14 he was charged with illegally entering a restricted zone, illegal swimming and breaking immigration laws. Illegal entry carries a maximum penalty of five years in prison; immigration violations carry up to one year in jail. Yettaw shared his cell with two Burmese prisoners. He refused to eat food, hoping to induce another vision.

Upon his arrest he was carrying two empty five-litre plastic bottles, two small bags, his US passport, a flashlight, a camera protected by plastic wrap, a pair of pliers, a screw driver, a pair of folding pliers with laser, six memory cards, a torch light with dry cells, 28 separate dry cells, a hat, a white shirt with long sleeves, a pair of trousers, seven paper sheets with written English words, two paper sheets with printed words, two envelopes, two $100 bills, two $10 bills, one $50 bill, ninety-three 1000-kyat notes, and 10 visiting cards. Pictures on his camera included photographs of Aung San, a fighting peacock and a bookshelf.

As a result of the 2009 visit, the authorities declared that Aung San Suu Kyi breached the conditions of her house arrest. She was charged under the country's Law Safeguarding the State from the Dangers of Subversive Elements, which carried a three-to-five-year jail term. She and her two caretakers, Khin Khin Win and Win Ma Ma, were removed to the Insein prison, where they stayed for the duration of the trial. According to Police Brigadier General Myint Thein, prior to the Yettaw visit, authorities had considered letting Aung San Suu Kyi go free, but the incident "infringed on existing law and we unavoidably and regretfully had to take legal action against her."

Aung San Suu Kyi's followers insisted that the government used this incident to continue her detention until after the 2010 general elections. Other supporters have raised suspicions that the incident was constructed by the government. The Myanmar government alleged that Yettaw's visit involved a conspiracy of "internal and external anti-government elements" meant "to intensify international pressure" to release her. Her lawyer Kyi Win said on May 14: "Everyone is irritated with this American. All of these problems are his fault. He is a fool. Suu Kyi begged him to go back, but he said he was too tired. He slept overnight on the first floor." However, two weeks later her defense lawyer Nyan Win stated that "Daw Aung San Suu Kyi said she bore no grudge against Mr. Yettaw or his family."

Authorities closely investigated security lapses involving Yettaw's visits. It was announced on August 7 that after questioning sixty-one security members of the police battalion in question, one police lieutenant colonel was demoted, an undisclosed number of personnel were given three- to six-month prison terms for dereliction of duty, and over twenty others received actions against them under a Police Disciplinary Rule.

Tin Myo Win, Suu Kyi's physician, was under investigation as a conspirator but was released before the trial began.

== Trial ==
The criminal case, #47/2009, levied against Yettaw, Aung San Suu Kyi, Khin Khin Win and Win Ma Ma, began May 18, 2009 in the Yangon North District Court. Suu Kyi and Yettaw each pleaded not guilty to their charges.

On the first day a US consular officer was present to observe. Khin Maung Oo represented Yettaw. Yettaw faced charges relating to, according to the United States State Department, "immigration, trespassing into a restricted zone, and violating a law that protects the state from those desiring to cause subversive acts." The first day's witnesses included the two police officers who apprehended Yettaw in Inya Lake after he swam away from Aung San Suu Kyi's house. The officers initially thought Yettaw was a thief. When they discovered he was a foreigner, they turned him over to the Special Branch, which usually handles political cases.

On May 20, police major Tin Zaw Htun was called by the prosecution to testify. He provided details of items Yettaw left at her home, including three pair of sunglasses and two abaya-like dresses. The dresses and sunglasses were modelled for the court by two women. The Burmese government alleged that Yettaw used these garments to disguise himself. When questioned about these and other items left behind, Aung San Suu Kyi explained that Yettaw had left them for her as presents. Police captain Sa Kyaw Win was also called by the prosecution. He testified that on May 6 he seized sixty-one items from Yettaw's room on the fifth floor of the Beauty Land Hotel in Yangon. Confiscated items included: a camcorder and charger, a pair of night glasses, a vocal translator, a mobile phone and charger, a battery charger, a USB memory stick, a pair of scissors, a map published by Myanmar Tourism Service, and money hidden in a phone book.

On May 21, prosecutors submitted for evidence a video Yettaw created with the intent of uploading it onto YouTube. The video began with a shot of a photograph of Aung San and then a shot of Yettaw beside the photograph. Yettaw's voice-over explained that he was at Suu Kyi's home, that he asked her if he could film her, but she declined. "She looked nervous," Yettaw's narration explains, "and I am sorry for that."

On May 26, Aung San Suu Kyi took the stand to defend herself. When asked about Yettaw's visit, she testified that she and her assistants urged him to leave, and let him rest there for the day, but that he left her home before midnight. In response to questions about items Yettaw left behind, she said "I don’t know if Mr. Yettaw had forgotten to take them or left them. Only Mr. Yettaw will know." Later that day Myanma authorities officially lifted her house arrest, but continued to detain her in prison, although another government official stated that her house arrest did not expire for another six months.

On May 27, the court heard testimony from Yettaw and Suu Kyi's two caretakers, Khin Khin Win and Win Ma Ma. Her caretakers testified for 30 minutes each, and Yettaw testified for nearly three hours. He stated repeatedly that he was sent on this journey by God to protect Aung San Suu Kyi from a terrorist group trying to assassinate her. He stated that he was seen by policemen as he swam across the lake, and that they did not fire guns at him, but threw rocks instead. He also stated that he had tried to enter Suu Kyi's home previously, that police apprehended him, questioned him briefly and then let him go. On the same day, Aung San Suu Kyi released a statement alleging that Myanmar authorities were to blame for Yettaw's security breach. She had reported Yettaw's unwelcomed 2008 visit to authorities, but no action was ever taken.

On May 28, the defense's only witness, Kyi Win, took the stand. He stated that Yettaw entered Aung San Suu Kyi's restricted residence twice and each time security guards allowed it, and therefore they had also violated the law. Furthermore, because no action was taken by the security guards, then Yettaw, Aung San Suu Kyi and her assistants were not guilty of the charges. Through further questioning by Yettaw's lawyer, Khin Maung Oo, U Kyi Win added that the property Yettaw entered did not belong to Aung San Suu Kyi but instead belonged to the State because the government had official security guards around it. He also made the argument that the charges against her fall under parts of the law that were based on the now abolished 1974 constitution, and therefore are invalid.

Yettaw then took the stand. Yettaw stated that, on his own accord, he entered the property on the morning of May 4, that he left the property about midnight on May 5. Under cross-examination, Yettaw stated that in November 2008 and May 2009 he applied for Visas to visit Yangon, during which time he signed an agreement that he would respect Myanmar's laws and visa rules. He acknowledged that he entered the property secretly and without permission, that he knew the property was guarded. He also stated that he did not mean to break any immigration laws. In the afternoon authorities brought Yettaw to University Avenue Road and had him explain how he crossed Inya Lake. Yettaw explained how he entered the lake through a small drain on University Avenue Road and Than Lwin Street. University Avenue Road was closed off for an hour and a half during his explanation. The court then announced that the original verdict date of May 29 was to be postponed, and that final arguments would be made June 1. Of the eight days of proceedings, only two were open to journalists and diplomats. Also, Aung San Suu Kyi's lawyers were barred from discussions with her and authorities allowed none of them time to prepare her testimony.

The trial judge originally accepted only one of the four witnesses offered by the defense, while accepting fourteen of the twenty-three government witnesses, but on June 3, Yangon's Divisional Court agreed to hear an appeal from the defense to re-admit three witnesses: Win Tin, Tin Oo and Khin Moe Moe, all members of the National League for Democracy. The appeal was set for June 5, but not until June 9 did the Divisional Court agree to allow Khin Moe Moe's testimony. Her lawyers then sent an appeal to the High Court to allow the other two witnesses. The appeal was accepted by the Court and scheduled for June 17. Closing arguments were rescheduled for June 12, but her lawyers requested and had granted an adjournment until June 26 to allow Khin Moe Moe to testify at the trial. Khin Moe Moe needed time to travel from Shan State and to prepare.

On June 11, 2009, Suu Kyi wrote a letter to the court explaining that after asking Yettaw to leave, she allowed him to stay overnight in order that he might avoid arrest and on the excuse of his health condition. On June 24, the Burmese Supreme Court heard arguments from her lawyers for allowing two more defence witnesses to testify. Judges argued that, because Tin Oo was under house arrest and because Win Tin said things in interviews with the Democratic Voice of Burma that were critical of the Myamna government, they should not be allowed to testify. Five days later the Court officially rejected the two witnesses.

On June 26, the Court set Khin Moe Moe's appearance for July 3. On the same day United Nations envoy Ibrahim Gambari arrived in Naypyidaw and met with foreign minister Nyan Win. He was not able to meet with Aung San Suu Kyi, but did request that Myanmar free its political prisoners. The expressed purpose of Gambari's visit was to open the door for a visit by U.N. chief Ban Ki-moon. Ban arrived in Naypyitaw on July 3, but after two days of talks with General Than Shwe, Ban was unable to negotiate a visit with Aung San Suu Kyi and left without any progress.

On July 3, the Court announced the adjournment was extended for another week. Defense witness Khin Moe Moe took the stand July 10, testifying for six hours (from 10:00 am to 5:00 pm with an hour lunch at noon). Khin Moe Moe and the defense team argued that the law under which Aung San Suu Kyi was being tried, Section 22, which protects the government from people planning subversive acts, was created under the 1974 Constitution, which was abolished by the current government in 1988. He was the last witness of the trial. Final arguments were set by the Court for July 24.

On July 24, her defense gave a 30-page closing statement. British, German, Norwegian, French and Italian diplomats were present, marking only the third time during the trial Burmese officials had allowed such access. The trial was then adjourned over the weekend until July 27, providing the prosecution more time to prepare.

On July 27, the defense team submitted an application to the court to call an additional witness, Nyunt Maung Shein, a Burmese foreign ministry official. Final arguments were presented for Yettaw, Khin Khin Win and Win Ma Ma. The morning session was attended by diplomats from Australia, Japan, Singapore, the United States, the Philippines and Malaysia, while in the afternoon only US Consul Colin Furst was in attendance. The final defence arguments, including a 15-minute statement from Yettaw, concluded 28 July. Again, diplomats from the US, Japan, Singapore and Thailand were present. The Court announced the verdicts would be made July 31. Officials then notified shops in the vicinity to be closed July 31. Two police battalions also arrived to support the already existing security forces. However, on July 31 judges Thaung Nyunt and Nyi Nyi Soe, citing an undisclosed problem with the legal procedures, adjourned the trial until August 11, three days after the anniversary of the 8888 Uprising. After the announcement, Yettaw moved about the courtroom and said "I love you" to the defense team.

The verdict came on August 11. Yettaw was condemned to a total of seven years: three for violating Aung San Suu Kyi's house arrest, three hard labor for breaking immigration laws, and one hard labor for trespassing. Aung San Suu Kyi was initially sentenced to three years of hard labor, but after a five-minute recess, Than Shwe reduced it to eighteen months of house arrest. Khin Khin Win and Win Ma Ma were also sentenced to eighteen months.

=== Health issues during the trial ===
On May 8, Yettaw began to decline food, claiming religious reasons, and accepted only water. On July 9, he was removed to Insein Prison hospital because he was still refusing food. There authorities began feeding him intravenously.

On August 3, Yettaw was taken from Insein prison and admitted to Yangon General Hospital after having seizures. He was isolated in intensive care in a heavily guarded separate room and treated by neurological specialists. Previous to this incident, Yettaw had been held in the prison's hospital where he received regular treatment for his seizures and diabetic and heart conditions. Two days later, Yettaw was visited by US Embassy official Colin Furst. The same day, defense lawyer Nyan Win expressed concern that Yettaw's condition may further delay the trial because "the court normally doesn't make judgment in the absence of the accused." Yettaw remained in intensive care throughout the week. On August 7, he suffered three more fits, according to Police Brigadier General Khin Yi. Yettaw was discharged August 10.

== Release from Burma ==
On August 12, 2009, US Senator Jim Webb negotiated Yettaw's release on humanitarian grounds because of Yettaw's health. Myanmar authorities commuted Yettaw's sentence in half, suspending the remaining three-and-a-half years upon Yettaw's deportation. On August 14, Senator Webb flew with Yettaw to Thailand. Yettaw had to be helped off the plane. He gave reporters an "I love you" sign, but did not respond to any questions. He was immediately placed in an undisclosed Bangkok hospital. The next day he underwent medical examination. According to Senator Webb and Yettaw's family members, Yettaw was not in good health.

On August 19, Yettaw made a near 24-hour trip from Bangkok to the United States, landing first in Chicago and then flying on to Springfield, Missouri. While transferring planes in O'Hare International Airport, he was in a wheelchair and wore a surgical mask. He said to reporters there "If I had to do it again, I would do it a hundred times, a hundred times, to save her life", also adding "that they locked her up; it just breaks my heart." He refused a later question by saying "I wish I could talk more. I can't." He then made a zipper motion over his lips. Upon his arrival at Springfield-Branson National Airport, at the request of his family, Yettaw was escorted out the side of the airport to avoid the media.

== Biography of Yettaw ==
John Yettaw
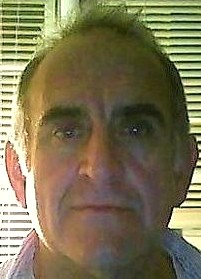
- Yettaw in 2010
- Born: John William Yettaw; September 7, 1955; Detroit, Michigan
- Died: May 21, 2021 (aged 65); Lebanon, Missouri
- Education: Drury University (psychology, sociology, criminal justice, and biology; 1997)
- Occupations: Psychology graduate student Building contractor
- Website: John 7 Children (travel blog)

Yettaw was born in Detroit, Michigan on September 7, 1955. He lived with relatives in California from 1969 to 1973 until he was able to join the United States Army.

He served for just over a year before being discharged, spending a majority of that time in Germany according to his military records. His family has said that Yettaw told them he has served stints in the US military in several countries of Southeast Asia. Yettaw was diagnosed around 1999 with post-traumatic stress disorder related to his military service.

At age 20, in southern California now, Yettaw married for the first time and converted to the Church of Jesus Christ of Latter-day Saints, a faith which he held until his death. During this time, he was licensed as a general contractor.

In 1993, he moved to Missouri and graduated from Drury University in 1997, cum laude. He earned degrees there in biology, psychology, and criminal justice He then worked as a tour bus driver at Fort Leonard Wood.

After the trespassing incidents, Yettaw continued to live in Missouri and was in custody of four minor-aged children from a subsequent marriage. He was enrolled in a doctoral program at the Forest Institute's School of Professional Psychology (Springfield, Missouri campus), but left the program in 2007. As of May 2009, Yettaw was still paying off the travel cost of his 2008 visit.

Yettaw died May 21, 2021, at his home in Lebanon, Missouri.

== See also ==
- Myanmar–United States relations
- James Mawdsley
