= Khin Kyi =

Burmese politician and diplomat

Her Excellency Maha Thiri Thudhamma Khin Kyi
- ခင်ကြည်
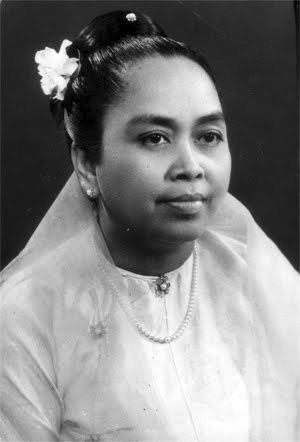

Burmese Ambassador to India
- In office 1960–1967
- Prime Minister: U Nu; Ne Win

Minister of Social Welfare
- In office 1953–1960
- Prime Minister: U Nu; Ne Win
- Preceded by: None

Member of the Pyithu Hluttaw
- In office 1947–1948
- Constituency: Lanmadaw Township

Personal details
- Born: 16 April 1912 Myaungmya, British Raj
- Died: 27 December 1988 (aged 76) Rangoon, Burma
- Cause of death: Stroke
- Resting place: Kandawmin Garden Mausolea, Yangon, Myanmar
- Spouse: Aung San (m. 1942; died 1947)
- Children: Aung San Oo; Aung San Suu Kyi
- Relatives: Alexander Aris (grandson)
- Education: Teachers' Training College; Kemmendine Girls School
- Occupation: Diplomat, Politician

Maha Thiri Thudhamma Khin Kyi (Burmese: ခင်ကြည်; 16 April 1912 – 27 December 1988) was a Burmese politician and diplomat, best known for her marriage to the country's leader, Aung San, with whom she had four children, including Aung San Suu Kyi. She served as the Minister of Social Welfare and MP of the Pyithu Hluttaw for Lanmadaw Township.

== Early life and career ==
Khin Kyi was born on 16 April 1912 in Myaungmya during the British Raj to parents Pho Hnyin and Phwa Su. Although it is rumored that Khin Kyi herself was an ethnic Karen Christian, she was in fact a Buddhist of Bamar ancestry. As her family lived in the Irrawaddy delta, heavily populated by ethnic Karens, her father Pho Hnyin converted to Christianity (baptised in the Baptist Church) as a young man, while her mother was a staunch Buddhist.

She grew up in Myaungmya, an Irrawaddy delta town, the eighth of 10 brothers and sisters. Khin Kyi attended the American Baptist Mission-run Kemmendine Girls School (now Basic Education High School No. 1 Kyimyindaing) in Rangoon, and continued her tertiary education at the Teachers' Training College (TTC) in Moulmein. She then went on to become a teacher at the National School in her hometown, before deciding to give it up altogether to join the nursing profession against her mother's wishes, following the footsteps of her two elder sisters, who were at the time, training to become nurses. Khin Kyi moved to Rangoon and joined the staff of the Rangoon General Hospital as a nursing probationer.

Khin Kyi first met Aung San in 1942, when he was recovering from injuries sustained during the Burma Campaign, at the Rangoon General Hospital, where she served as a senior nurse. The couple wed in September of that year.

== Political career ==
She served as a member of parliament in the country's first post-independence government from 1947 to 1948, representing Rangoon's Lanmadaw Township, the constituency that her husband had won. In 1953, she was appointed as Burma's first Minister of Social Welfare.

Khin Kyi served as the various posts including director of the Burma Women's Association from 1947–1953, chair of the Social Welfare Planning Commission from 1953–1958, chair of the Union of Burma Social Welfare Council, chair of Mother and Child Welfare, chair of the Child Welfare Council, chair of Health and Public Affairs Committee, chair of the Union of Burma Women's Associations Council, chair of the Association for the Advancement of Democracy, chief scout of the Burma Women's Scout Association, administrator of the Myanmar Ambulance Service, and vice-chair of Ramakrishna Missionary Hospital and Library.

In 1953, following the death of her second oldest son, Aung San Lin, the family moved from their house on Tower Lane (now Bogyoke Museum Lane), near Kandawgyi Lake, to a colonial-era villa by the shores of Inya Lake, on University Avenue Road. Their former house was converted to the Bogyoke Aung San Museum in 1962.

In 1960, Khin Kyi was appointed as Burma's Ambassador to India, and became the country's first woman to serve as the head of a diplomatic mission. During her tenure in New Delhi, Indian prime minister Jawaharlal Nehru specially arranged for Khin Kyi and Suu Kyi to live on 24 Akbar Road, in a colonial-era complex designed by Edwin Lutyens. The site, then called "Burma House," is now the national headquarters of the Indian National Congress.

== Death ==
She died in Rangoon on 27 December 1988, at the age of 76, after suffering a severe stroke. Her funeral, held on 2 January 1989, was attended by over 200,000 people, despite the presence of military trucks which intervened to try to prevent this gathering. She is buried at Kandawmin Garden Mausolea on Shwedagon Pagoda Road in Yangon.

In 2012, her daughter Aung San Suu Kyi founded the Daw Khin Kyi Foundation. It is named in her honour. It works to improve the education, health and welfare of the people of Myanmar.

== Family ==
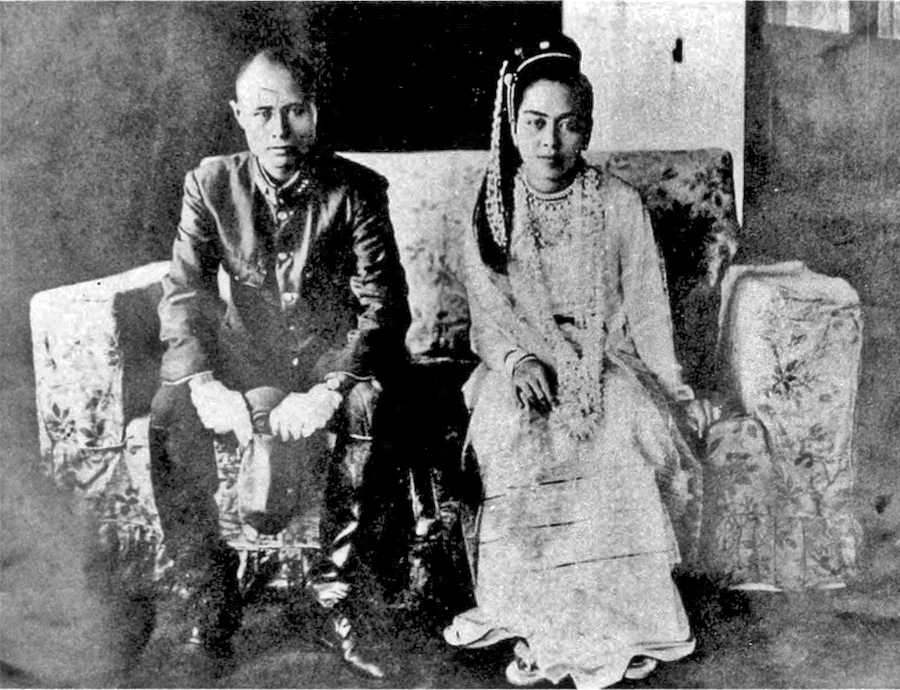
The wedding of Aung San and Khin Kyi

She married Aung San on 7 September 1942. The pair had four children, 2 sons: Aung San Oo and Aung San Lin (who died by drowning at the age of 8) and 2 daughters: Aung San Suu Kyi and Aung San Chit, who died after delivery.

== See also ==
- Daw Khin Kyi Foundation
