= Remembering Wildlife =

Series of wildlife photography books

- Founded: 2015
- Founder: Margot Raggett
- Founded at: London, United Kingdom
- Type: Private limited company
- Headquarters: London, United Kingdom
- Products: Wildlife photography books
- Official language: English
- Website: rememberingwildlife.com

Remembering Wildlife is a wildlife photography book series founded in 2015 by British wildlife photographer Margot Raggett. The organisation publishes wildlife photography books focused on threatened and endangered species to raise funds for conservation projects helping those species.

Each book in the series focuses on a single species and features images donated by wildlife photographers from around the world. The books have published species including elephants, rhinos, great apes, lions, cheetahs, African wild dogs, bears, leopards and tigers, as well as a retrospective book for the project's tenth anniversary with a feature on pangolins.

== History ==
Remembering Wildlife was founded in 2015 by wildlife photographer Margot Raggett following her experience of witnessing the aftermath of elephant poaching in Kenya in 2014. The experience prompted Raggett to bring together a group of other wildlife photographers to contribute images to a book that would raise money for elephant conservation. The resulting project, Remembering Elephants, became the first in what would develop into a series of wildlife photography books.

The first crowdfunding campaign for Remembering Elephants ran on Kickstarter in 2015. It raised £58,125 against a target of £20,000. The success of the first book led Raggett to continue the series, with each subsequent volume focusing on a different threatened species and bringing together photographs contributed by wildlife photographers. The series was conceived as a way of combining wildlife photography with fundraising for conservation in initiatives as well as raising awareness of threats facing these endangered species.

The following crowdfunding campaigns also helped build public interest in the individual books. For example, a campaign for Remembering Leopards reach its minimum target of £20,000 within four minutes and surpassed £100,000 pledged within one day.

As the series developed, it attracted contributions from photographers from around the world. More than 300 wildlife photographers have since contributed to the books, including Jonathan Scott and Angela Scott, Art Wolfe, Michael Poliza, Mark Dumbleton, Neil Aldridge, Suzi Eszterhas, Marsel van Oosten, Frans Lanting, Greg du Toit, Tristan Dicks and James Gifford. The project has also received public support from figures including actors Pierce Brosnan, Michelle Pfeiffer,Russell Crowe, and comedian Ricky Gervais.

In 2023, Margot Raggett was appointed a Member of the Order of the British Empire (MBE) in the 2023 Birthday Honours for services to international wildlife conservation.

And, in 2025, the project marked its tenth anniversary with the publication of 10 Years of Remembering Wildlife, a retrospective book featuring photographs from across the series and an additional focus on pangolins to raise awareness of the illegal pangolin trade.

The latest book Remembering Giraffes (and the 11th book in the series) was launched in 2026. Its crowdfunding campaign raised £107,000 within the first 48 hours during its Kickstarter campaign.

== Publications ==
Remembering Wildlife has published one book per year since 2016.

Year	Title	Cover
2016	Remembering Elephants	
2017	Remembering Rhinos	
2018	Remembering Great Apes	
2019	Remembering Lions	
2020	Remembering Cheetahs	
2021	Remembering African Wild Dogs	
2022	Remembering Bears	
2023	Remembering Leopards	
2024	Remembering Tigers	
2025	10 Years of Remembering Wildlife	
2026	Remembering Giraffes	

=== Book Awards ===
Four books in the series have received awards at the Independent Publisher Book Awards (IPPY) as well the series itself attaining an award in the 'Non-Fiction Book Series' category:

- In 2022, Remembering Cheetahs was awarded the IPPY Gold Medal in the Nature category.
- In 2024, Remembering Bears was awarded the IPPY Silver Medal in the Photography category.
- In 2024, Remembering Wildlife was also awarded the IPPY Silver Medal in the Non-Fiction Book Series category.
- In 2025, Remembering Tigers was awarded the IPPY Bronze Medal in the Photography category.
- In 2025, 10 Years of Remembering Wildlife was also awarded the IPPY Silver Medal in the Nature category.

== Fundraising and conservation work ==
The books are produced through voluntary contributions from wildlife photographers, with images selected through a judging process. Production of each book is pre-funded through Kickstarter crowdfunding campaigns.

By August 2026, Mongabay reported that Remembering Wildlife had raised more than US$1.6 million for 85 conservation organisations in 35 countries. The funding has supported a number of projects covering anti-poaching work, wildlife monitoring, ranger support, species protection and the rescue and care of individual animals.

The following are examples of projects and organisations that have received funding from the series:

- Remembering Elephants supported the Mali Elephant Project, including funding for anti-poaching equipment, elephant monitoring and ranger support.
- Remembering Rhinos raised more than £200,000 for projects across Africa and Asia, including support for Rhino Conservation Botswana.
- Some funds from Remembering Great Apes, which included a foreword by Jane Goodall, were donated to the Jane Goodall Institute to support work at Tchimpounga Nature Reserve and to the Gorilla Doctors in Rwanda.
- Remembering Lions supported the Niassa Lion Project in Niassa National Reserve in Mozambique.
- Funds from Remembering Leopards supported projects including those run by the Wildlife Conservation Society, the Cape Leopard Trust and the Tsavo Trust.
- Remembering Bears supported the Animals Asia Foundation, which works to rescue bears from bile farming.
- Projects supported by Remembering Cheetahs included the Cheetah Conservation Fund and the Naankuse Foundation.
- Remembering African Wild Dogs supported projects including the Kalahari African Wild Dog Trust in Namibia and conservation initiatives in Zimbabwe and Malawi.

== See also ==
- Wildlife photography
- Wildlife conservation
- Conservation photography
