= Ma Thida =

Burmese human rights activist, writer, surgeon

- မသီတာ
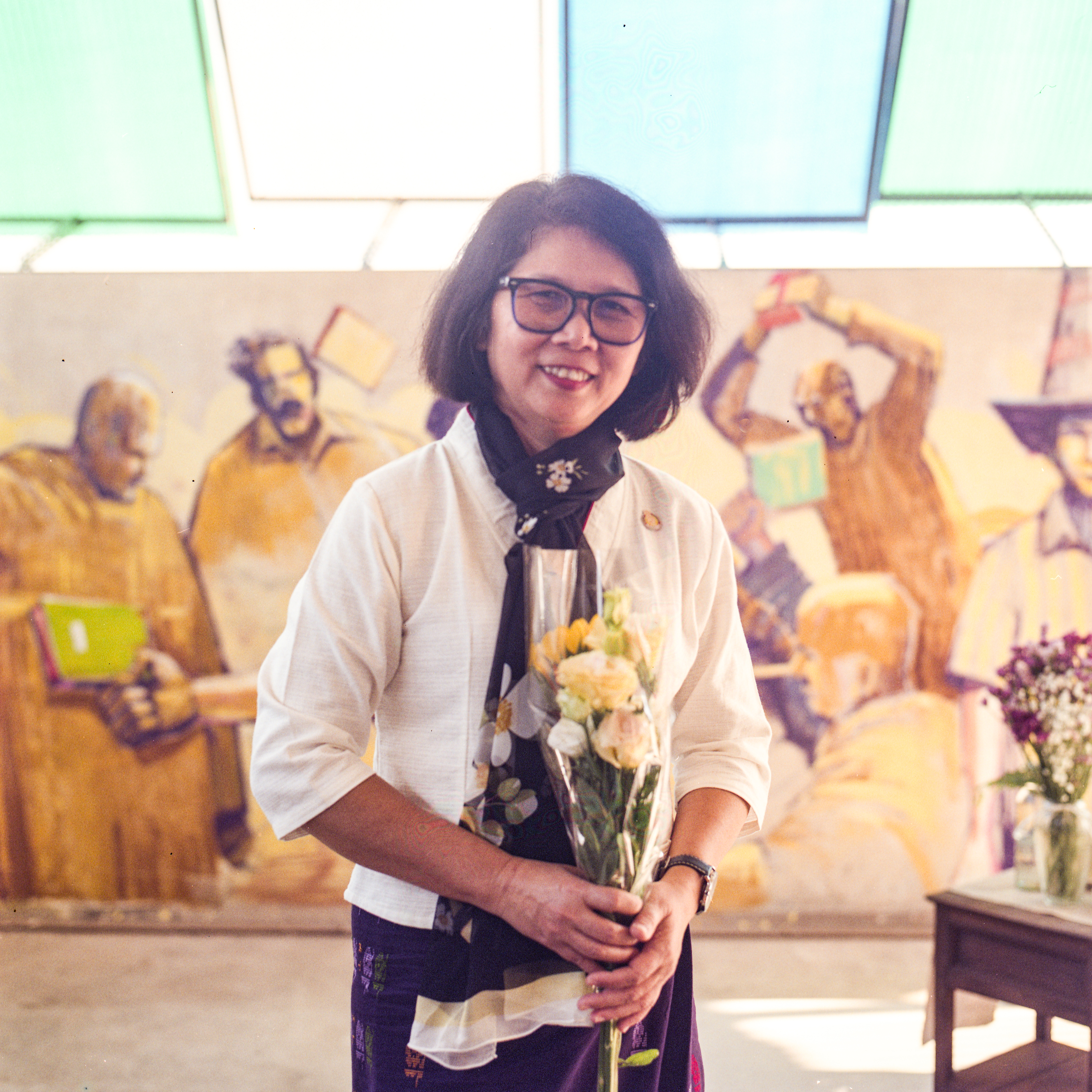
- Thida in 2025
- Born: 2 September 1966 (age 60); Myanmar
- Occupations: Surgeon; writer; human rights activist
- Known for: Human rights works, former Political prisoner

Ma Thida (Burmese: မသီတာ, MLCTS: ma. si ta; born 2 September 1966 is a Burmese surgeon, writer, human rights activist and former prisoner of conscience. She has published under the pseudonym Suragamika which means "brave traveler". In Myanmar, Thida is best known as a leading intellectual, whose books deal with the country's political situation. She has worked as an editor at a Burmese monthly youth magazine and a weekly newspaper. She has been a surgeon at Muslim Free Hospital, which provides free services to the poor.

== Life and works ==
Ma Thida studied medicine in the early 1980s earning a degree in surgery, and also took up writing at a young age. She said, "I wanted to become a writer because I want to share what I observe around me, like poverty." Her interest in health care developed after falling ill as a child.

In October 1993, she was sentenced to 20 years in Insein Prison for "endangering public peace, having contact with illegal organisations, and distributing unlawful literature." In fact, she was actively supporting Aung San Suu Kyi, a Nobel laureate and founder of the main opposition party in Burma. She served nearly six years in unhealthy, mostly solitary conditions. She contracted tuberculosis without adequate access to medical care. During this time she was awarded several international human rights awards, including the Reebok Human Rights Award (1996) and the PEN/Barbara Goldsmith Freedom to Write Award (1996). Ma Thida said, "Were it not for vipassana (Buddhist meditation), I would not have overcome the untold hardships I faced in prison." In 1999, she was released on "humanitarian grounds" after serving five years, six months and six days. She was released due to declining health, increasing political pressure and the efforts of human rights organizations like Amnesty International and PEN International. Later she chaired the Pen Myanmar. In 1996 she received the award of year's PEN/Barbara Goldsmith Freedom to Write while she was still in prison. From 2008 to 2010, she lived in the US as an International Writers Project Fellow at Brown University and a Fellow of the Radcliffe Institute for Advanced Studies at Harvard University.

Her first book is The Sunflower, which was only released in Burma in 1999, as it was banned upon international release in the early 1990s. The book argues that the Burmese people have high expectations of democracy icon Suu Kyi that made her "a prisoner of applause." The Roadmap (2012) is a fictional story based on events in Burmese politics from 1988 to 2009. The Myanmar-language book Sanchaung, Insein, Harvard is a memoir, as the title suggests, about her early life in Sanchaung, imprisonment in Insein, and time in the United States.

In 2016, the English translation of her prison memoir Sanchaung, Insein, Harvard was published as Prisoner of Conscience: My Steps through Insein.

She was honored with the 2016 'Disturbing the Peace' award given by the Vaclav Havel Library Foundation, for her humanitarian values and for having suffered unjust persecution for her beliefs. In 2016, she was elected to the board of PEN International at 82nd PEN International Congress held in Galician, Spain. She was previously president of PEN Myanmar. She is the chair of the Writer in prison committee of PEN International.

She left Myanmar in 2021, soon after the military seized power in a coup.

== Works ==
- The Sunflower (1999)
- In the Shade of an Indian Almond Tree (1999)
- Sweet and spicy honey mud (1999)
- Insight of colorful lights and beyond esthetic border (1999)
- One, Zero and Ten for Teens (2003)
- Message to Teen (2011)
- Translation of Japanese Women's Poems (2011)
- The Roadmap (2011)
- Sanchaung, Insein, Harvard (2012)
- A Letter for Daw Aung San Suu Kyi (2013)
- The Imperishable Dictum (2014)
- Brown to Crimson (2014)
- What Is Independent Citizen's Spirit? (2014)
- Youths Who Dare To Live and Compete(2014)
- Nothing to Lose But Your Life (2015)
- From Selfishness to Leaving From Fear(2015)
- Prisoner of Conscience: My Steps through Insein (2016)
- Writing of Ma Thida (2016)
- A-Maze: Myanmar’s Struggle for Democracy, 2011-2023 (2024)
