= Jonathan Raggett =

British film actor

- Born: 3 November 1992 (age 33); Brighton, East Sussex, England
- Citizenship: England
- Education: Sussex Downs College
- Occupation: Actor
- Years active: 2011–present
- Height: 5 ft 6 in (1.68 m)

Jonathan Raggett (born 3 November 1992) is a Chinese–English actor. His career includes notable roles in productions such as Wolfblood and The Lady.

== Career ==
He began his professional acting career in 2011, playing the youngest son of Aung San Suu Kyi in The Lady and guest-starring in the television series Dani's House. He and Amanda Donohoe were both cast in the 2013 film Trafficker.

Raggett then starred in a commercial for Nintendo DS. He gained further fame for his role as Jimi in the series Wolfblood.

In 2017 he featured in the horror film Strangers Within.

== Filmography ==
Year	Title	Role	Notes
2011	The Lady	Kim Aris	
2011	Dani's House	Kashuro	TV series
2012–2014	Wolfblood	Jimi Chen	TV series
2015	Trafficker	Dahn	
2017	Millie Inbetween	Harry	TV sitcom
2017	Strangers Within	Mike	
2024	Renegade Nell	Jamie	1 episode
