= Muslim Free Hospital =

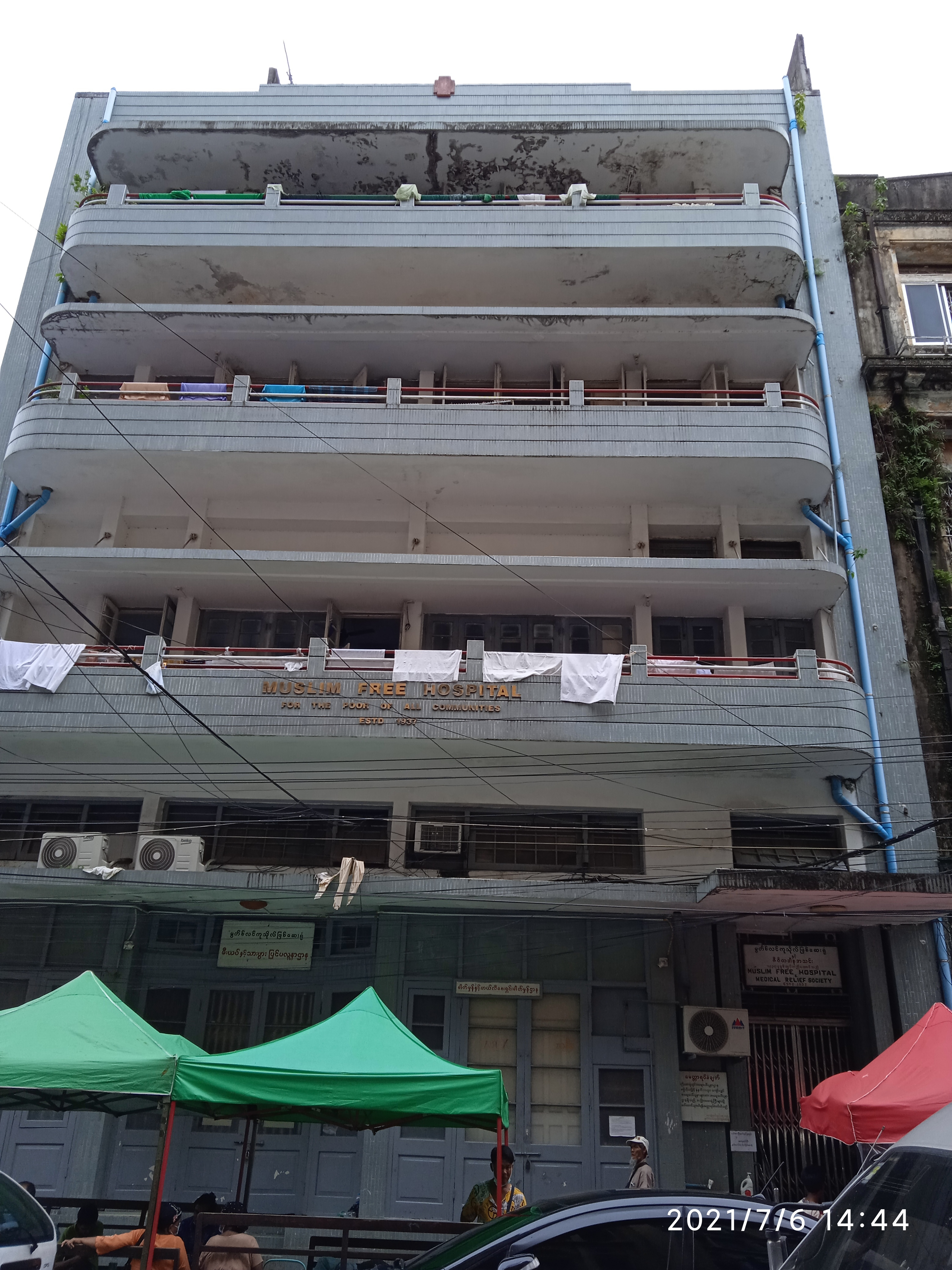

Geography
- Location: 196, 200 Maha Bandula Park St, Yangon, Myanmar
- Coordinates: 16.776533°N 96.160539°E

Organisation
- Type: General
- Religious affiliation: Muslim

History
- Opened: 1937

Links
- Lists: Hospitals in Myanmar

The Muslim Free Hospital (Burmese: မွတ်စ်လင်ကုသိုလ်ဖြစ်ဆေးရုံ) was established as a small dispensary in 1937 in Yangon, Myanmar (formerly Burma) and has gradually been expanded to its present status of a 160-bed hospital.

The chief aims and objectives of the hospital are to help the poor, the needy and the sick without discrimination of caste, creed or colour. The hospital is one of many in Myanmar run purely on a voluntary basis and raises funds to treat people.

The hospital comprises three buildings; main on the Maha Bandula Garden Street and two buildings on the 35th Street and are connected by over head bridges.

The author and human rights activist Ma Thida has worked as a surgeon at the hospital.
