= Margot Raggett =

Wildlife photographer

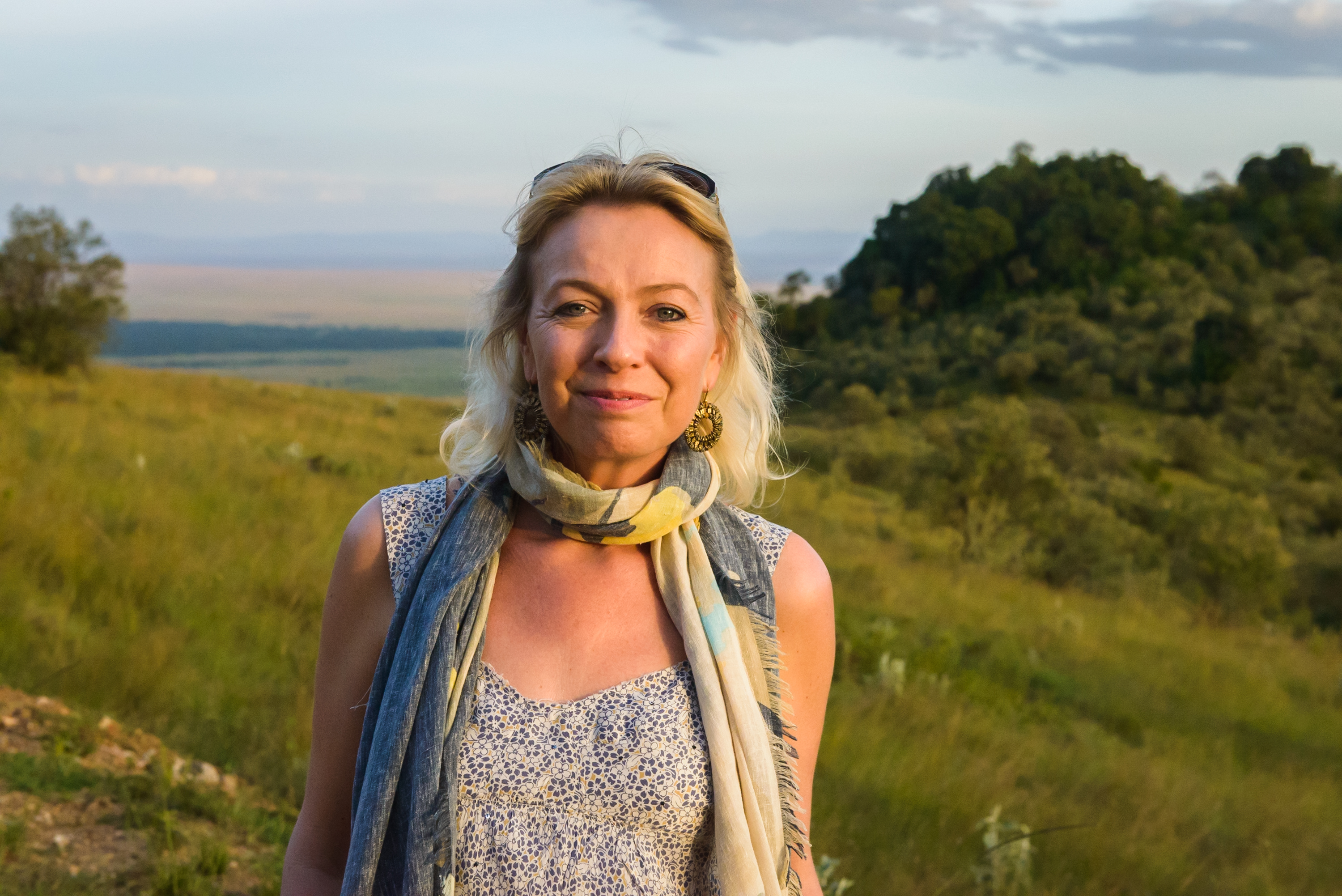
- Occupations: Wildlife photographer, Founder and Director of Remembering Wildlife
- Awards: Member of the Order of the British Empire (MBE)

Margot Vanessa Raggett is a British wildlife photographer and conservation advocate. She is also the founder and director of the Remembering Wildlife photography book series.

== Career ==
Raggett began her career in public relations, working in senior roles within the UK communications industry. She worked at the London-based agency Lexis PR, where she was operations director during a management buyout of the company in 2002.

She later held executive leadership positions within the agency, including as chief executive officer.

Following her two-decade career in public relations, Raggett left her corporate PR career in London in 2010 to concentrate on wildlife photography. She took her first serious wildlife photographs during a photographic safari to Kenya's Maasai Mara that year, subsequently undertaking photography training at the London School of Photography.

In 2013, she arranged to spend extended periods at Entim Camp in the Maasai Mara, exchanging her marketing skills for time in the field; over the following three years she spent up to three months a year there. She subsequently became a regular Photographer in Residence at Entim Camp and led photographic safaris.

In 2015, she was diagnosed with breast cancer and in 2025, one decade later, she participated in Cancer Research UK's Shine Night Walk by walking a 10km route through London to celebrate being cancer-free.

In 2016, she founded the Remembering Wildlife initiative, combining photography and publishing to raise funds for conservation projects.

== Remembering Wildlife ==
In 2014, while in Kenya, Raggett witnessed the aftermath of elephant poaching, an experience that prompted her to later establish the Remembering Wildlife project.

She founded the initiative as a series of wildlife photography books featuring images donated by photographers under the collective name Wildlife Photographers United, with profits directed to conservation organisations.

The first book, Remembering Elephants, was published in 2016, followed by further volumes focusing on species including rhinos, great apes, lions, cheetahs, African wild dogs, bears, leopards, tigers as well as the retrospective book 10 Years of Remembering Wildlife, which had a special feature on pangolins.

The series has sold more than 55,000 copies. And, as of 2026, the series had raised more than US$1.6 million for 85 conservation organisations in 35 countries.

== Recognition ==
In 2023, Raggett was appointed a Member of the Order of the British Empire (MBE) in the 2023 Birthday Honours for services to international wildlife conservation.

In 2024, she received the Outstanding Achievement Award from SheClicks for her work with Remembering Wildlife.

In 2026, Raggett received the Hero of Photography award from Amateur Photographer for her work on the Remembering Wildlife series.

Raggett is also a Fellow of the Public Relations and Communications Association (FPRCA).

== Remembering Wildlife books ==
Raggett is the founder and producer of the Remembering Wildlife book series. The books are published under the collective name Wildlife Photographers United and bring together images from contributing wildlife photographers.

- Remembering Elephants (2016)
- Remembering Rhinos (2017)
- Remembering Great Apes (2018)
- Remembering Lions (2019)
- Remembering Cheetahs (2020)
- Remembering African Wild Dogs (2021)
- Remembering Bears (2022)
- Remembering Leopards (2023)
- Remembering Tigers (2024)
- 10 Years of Remembering Wildlife (2025)
- Remembering Giraffes (12 October 2026)
