= Inya Lake =

- အင်းလျားကန် (Burmese)
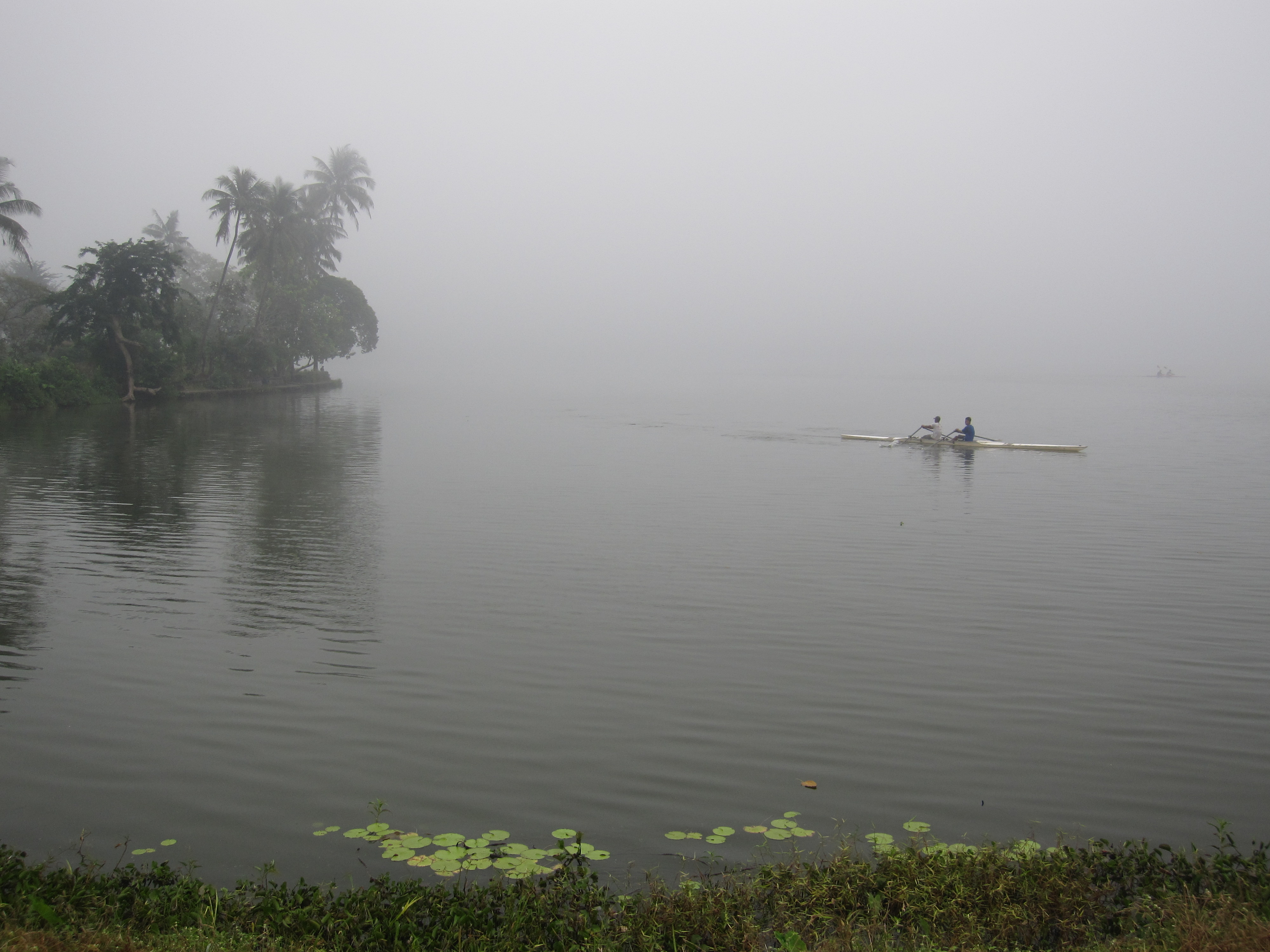
- Inya Lake

- Location within Myanmar
- Location: Yangon
- Coordinates: 16°50′12.38″N 96°8′42.78″E
- Type: reservoir
- Primary outflows: piped to Kandawgyi Lake
- Basin countries: Burma

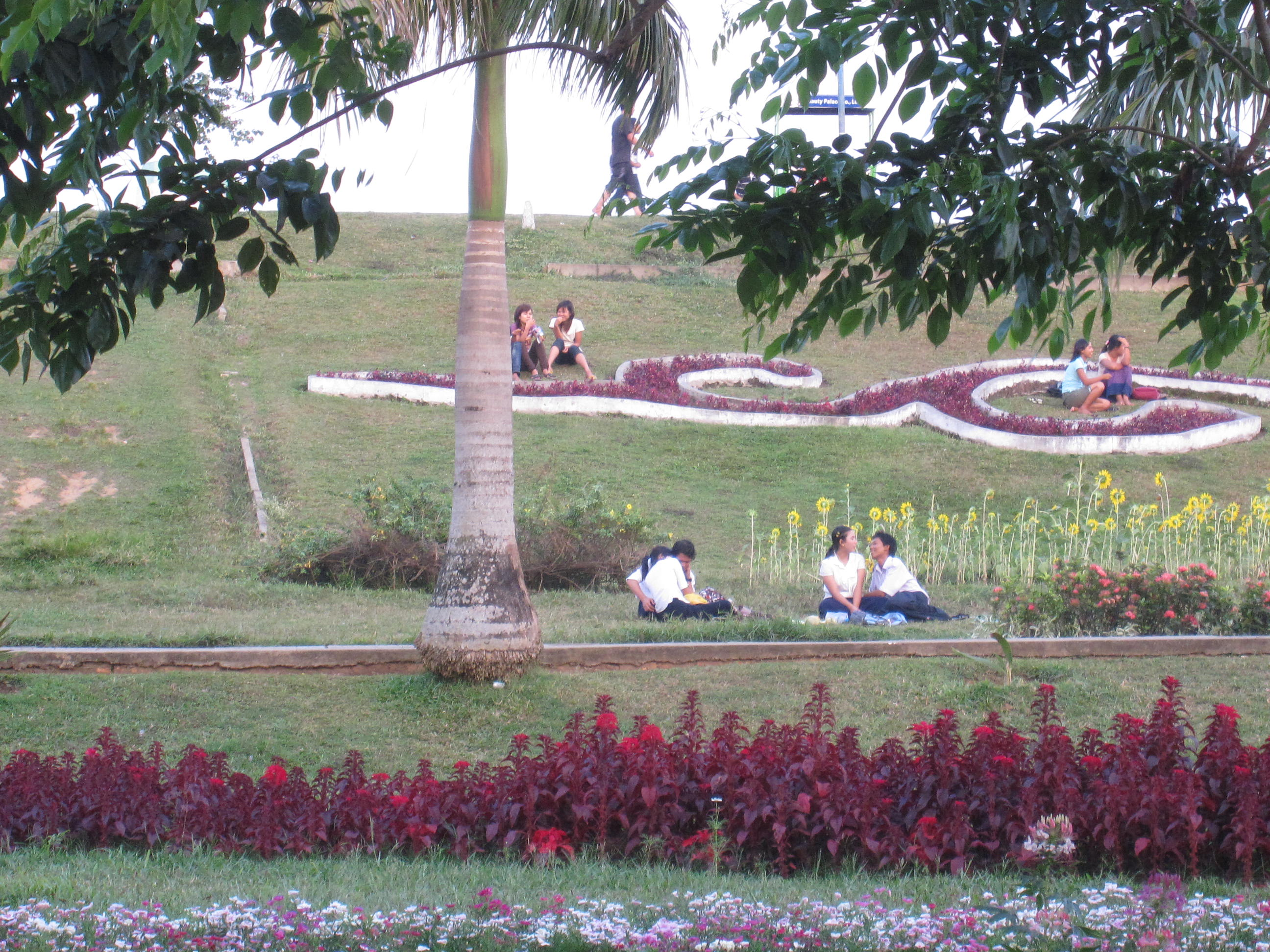
A popular meeting place for couples

Inya Lake (Burmese: အင်းလျားကန်, ʔīnyā kǎn [ʔíɰ̃já kàɰ̃]; formerly, Lake Victoria) is the largest lake in Yangon, Burma (Myanmar), a popular recreational area for Yangonites, and a famous location for romance in popular culture. Located 6 miles (10 km) north of downtown Yangon, Inya Lake is bounded by Parami Road on the north, Pyay Road on the west, Inya Road on the southwest, University Avenue on the south, and Kaba Aye Pagoda Road on the east.

== History ==
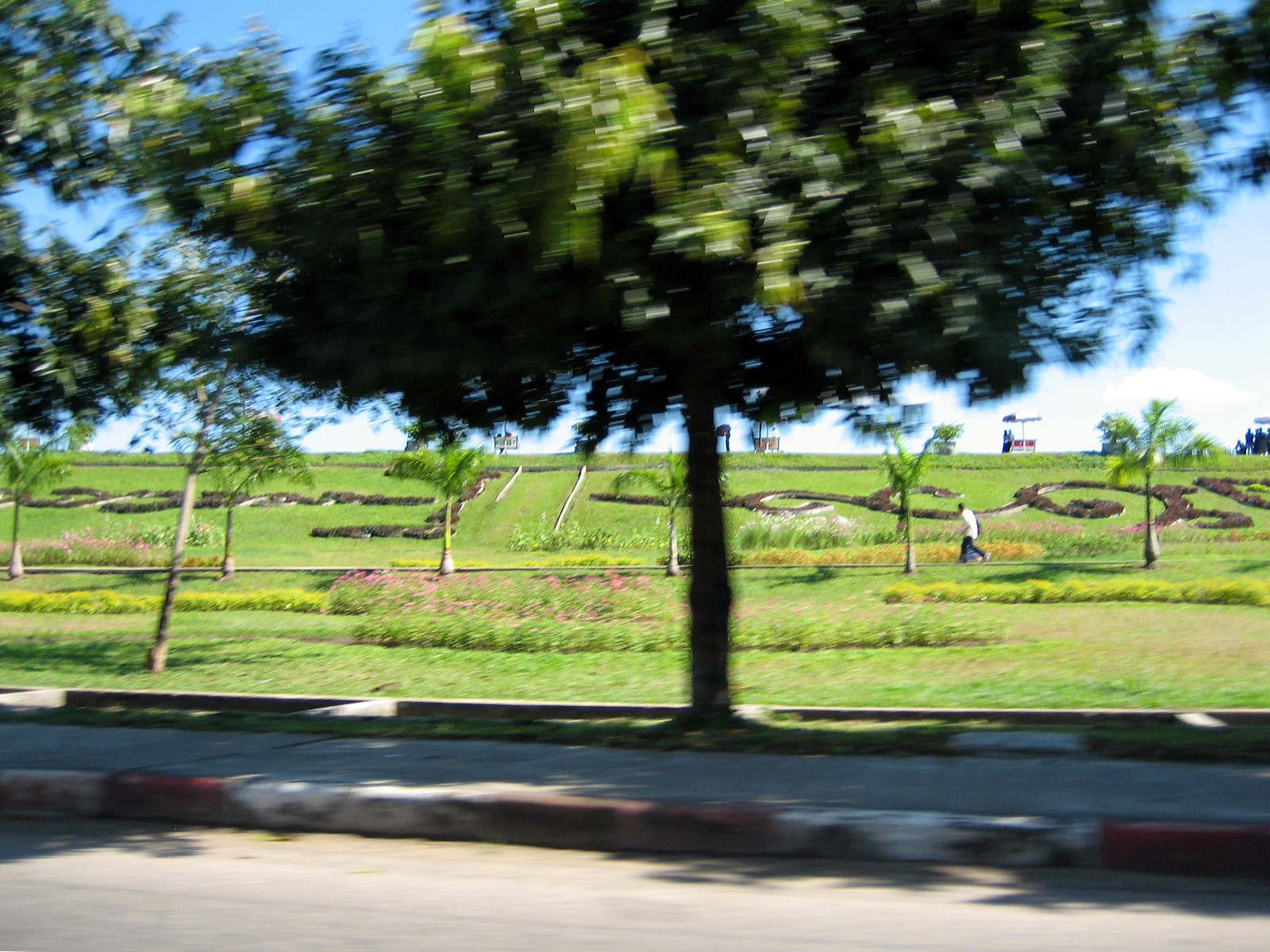
Inya Lake Park grounds

Inya Lake is an artificial lake created by the British as a water reservoir between 1882 and 1883 in order to provide a water supply to Yangon. The lake was formed by joining small hills that surrounded creeks which formed during the monsoon season and was initially called Lake Victoria. A network of pipes distributes water from Inya Lake to Kandawgyi Lake near downtown Yangon.

The area where the lake was created was initially known as Kokkine, a name which many locals continue to use to refer to the lake to this day. During World War II, the Imperial Japanese Army operated a weapons factory on the lakeshore disguised as a training school. Allied bombing of the factory has led to the occasional sunken artifact being retrieved from the bottom of the lake.

The Second Far East Regional Scout Conference was hosted by the University of Rangoon in 1960, with the First Far East Professional Scouters Training Conference held at Inyale Camp on Inya Lake as an ancillary event.

Construction of the hotel began in 1958 as a diplomatic gift from the Soviet Union during a state visit by Premier Nikita Khrushchev. It was completed in 1962 and designed by Soviet architects Viktor Andreyev and Kaleriya Kislova.

In 1958, the Soviet Union premier Nikita Khrushchev gifted Burma the Inya Lake Hotel after a state visit. The hotel opened in 1962. The building was intended to embody Soviet architectural style while accommodating Myanmar’s tropical climate. The structure features high ceilings, and a rooftop feature resembling a steamship funnel. An adjacent building resembling a Soviet "House of Culture" was constructed to serve as an event hall. During the socialist era, dictator Ne Win was annoyed by loud music from a 1975 Christmas Eve party at the hotel and stormed the party, kicking the band's drums with eight soldiers.

On 16 March 1988, following the killing of two students during the pro-democracy demonstrations, students marching on Prome Road (now Pyay Road) were confronted near Inya Lake by the Lon Htein security force riot police and many beaten to death or drowned. The lake was an epicenter of the protests because Aung San Suu Kyi had emerged as a leader of the resistance.

On 4 May 2009, the American citizen John William Yettaw trespassed upon the shoreline residence of Burmese political prisoner Aung San Suu Kyi, who was at the time under house arrest. This was two weeks before her scheduled release on 27 May. They were both arrested after the incident.

== Exclusive area ==
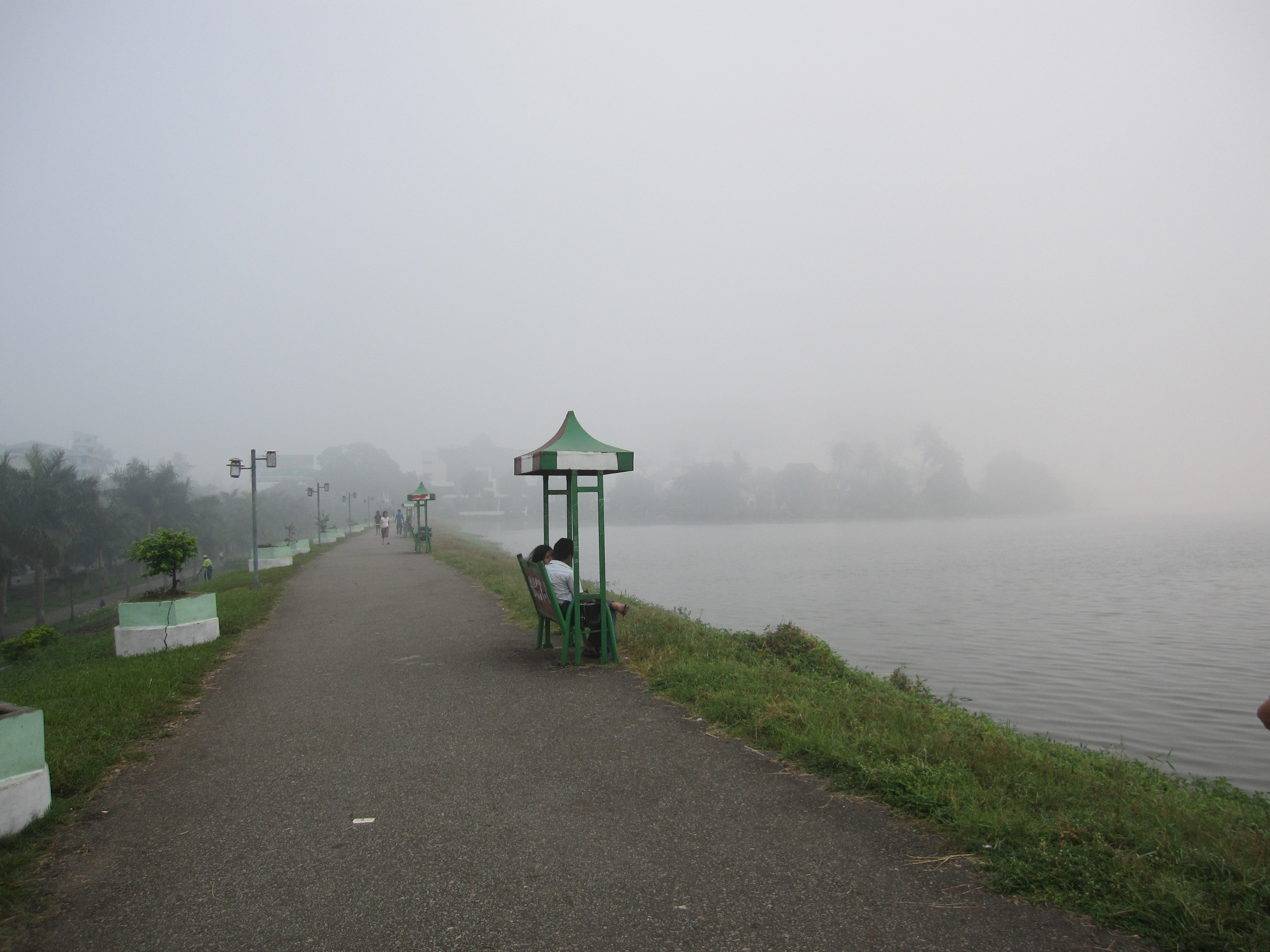
Inya Lake embankment – a popular location

The area surrounding Inya Lake is one of the most exclusive neighborhoods in Yangon. Except for a public park on the southwestern bank by Yangon University, much of the shoreline is some of the most expensive private property in the country. Lakefront properties include residences of Aung San Suu Kyi, the late strongman Ne Win, and the United States ambassador.

Public access to the lake is available through Kaba Aye Pagoda Road, and most popularly, through Inya Road and Pyay Road, next to Yangon University. It takes about two hours to circle the lake on foot.

== Inya Lake Park ==
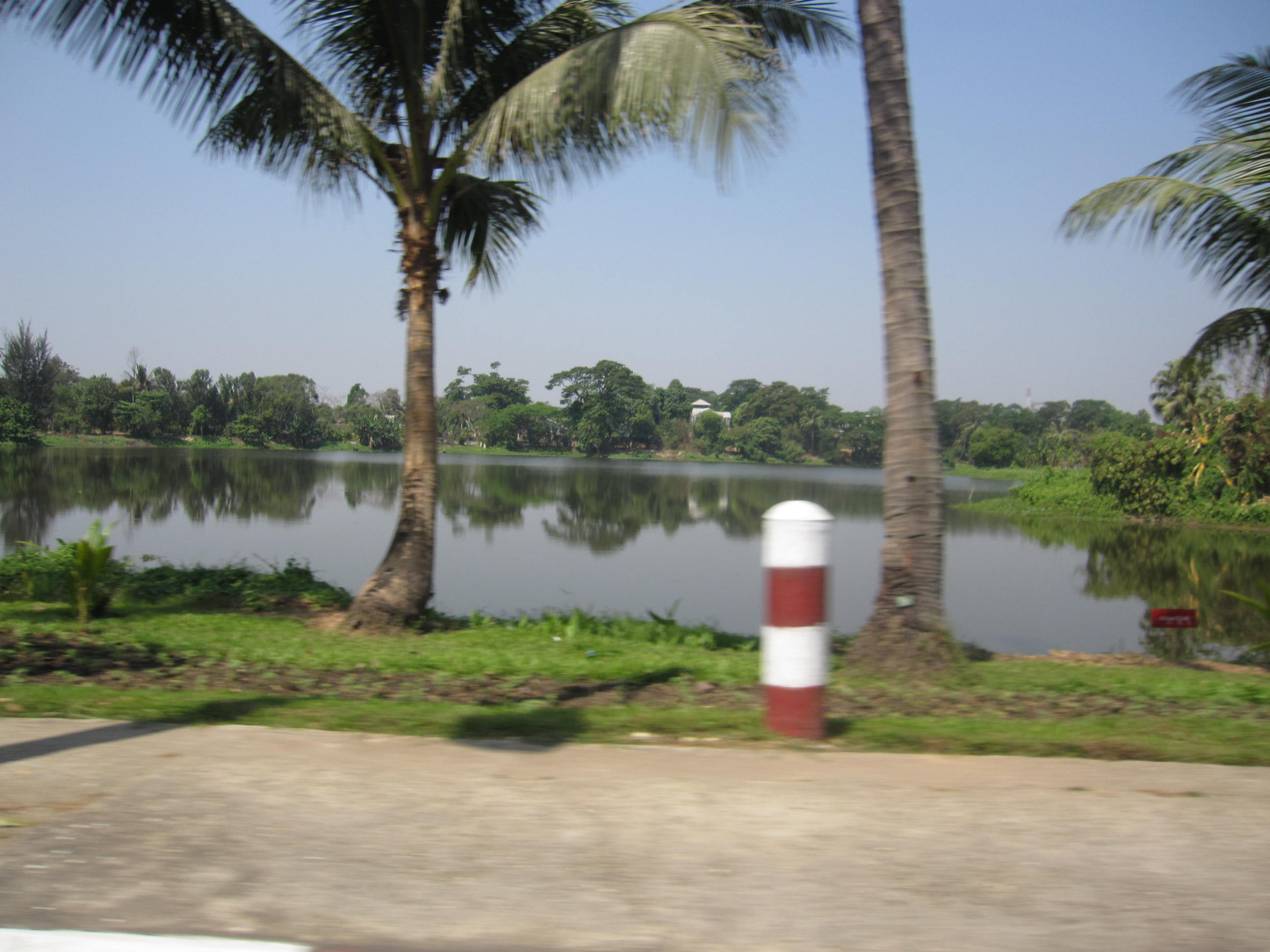
Inyale from Pyay Road

Located next to Yangon University, the 37-acre (15-hectare) park is most well known as a romantic dating area for the university students, and is chronicled many times over in Burmese popular culture (novels, movies, songs, etc.) Activities available to visitors include sailing and rowing. Yangon's premier sailing club is based on the lake.
