= Bogyoke Aung San Museum =

House museum in Yangon, Myanmar

- ဗိုလ်ချုပ် အောင်ဆန်း ပြတိုက်
- Established: 1962
- Location: 15 Bogyoke Aung San Lane, Bahan, Yangon, Myanmar; 16°48′13.82″N 96°9′48.20″E

Yangon City Landmark

The Bogyoke Aung San Museum (Burmese: ဗိုလ်ချုပ် အောင်ဆန်း ပြတိုက်), located in Bahan, Yangon, is a museum dedicated to General Aung San, the founder of modern Myanmar (formerly Burma). Established in 1962, the two-story museum was Aung San's last residence before his assassination in July 1947. It is a colonial-era villa, built in 1921, where his daughter Aung San Suu Kyi grew up as a child. The museum, with its focus on Gen. Aung San's short adult life, is complementary to the Bogyoke Aung San Residence Museum in Natmauk, Magwe Division, which is dedicated to his childhood and family memorabilia. It houses exhibits on his life story and general memorabilia including clothing, books, furniture, family photos and the late general's car.

For many years, the museum opened only for one day each year, from 9 am to 4 pm on the Martyrs' Day on 19 July. The restriction was in line with the current military government's policy of restricting any mention of Gen. Aung San in the media in order to marginalize Aung San Suu Kyi. The museum formally reopened on 24 March 2012.

The museum is listed on the Yangon City Heritage List.

== Ground floor displays ==
The majority of the displays are located at the family room, dining room and living room on the ground floor.

- Photos of his youth at Natmauk, including those of the Buddhist monastery where he received primary education, and other certificates of educational achievements
- Photos at various political activities and during travels abroad
- Displays of his famous speeches
- Family photos
- Other personal mementos such as handwritten notes to his wife Khin Kyi, personal lighter etched Aung San and ash tray, etc.
- Car used for official transport until the day of assassination

== Upper floor displays ==
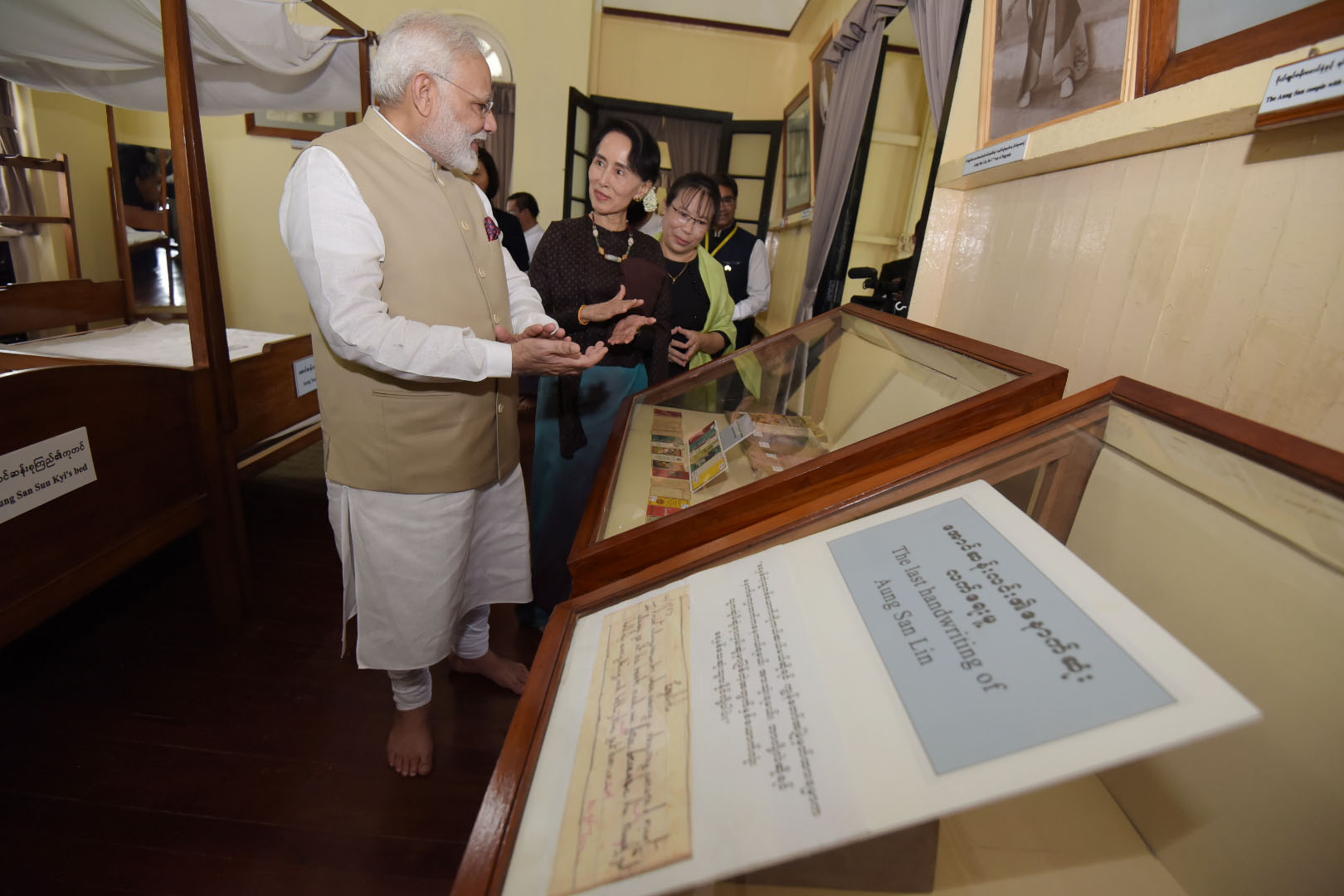
Prime Minister of India, Narendra Modi with the State Counsellor of Myanmar, Aung San Suu Kyi, at the Museum

- Bedroom of Aung San and Khin Kyi
- Bedrooms of their children
- Library
- Meeting room

== In the garden ==
In the garden of the house, there is a bronze statue of Aung San doing gardening work, and also the swimming pool where his middle son Aung San Lin drowned.
