= Strangers Within =

2017 film

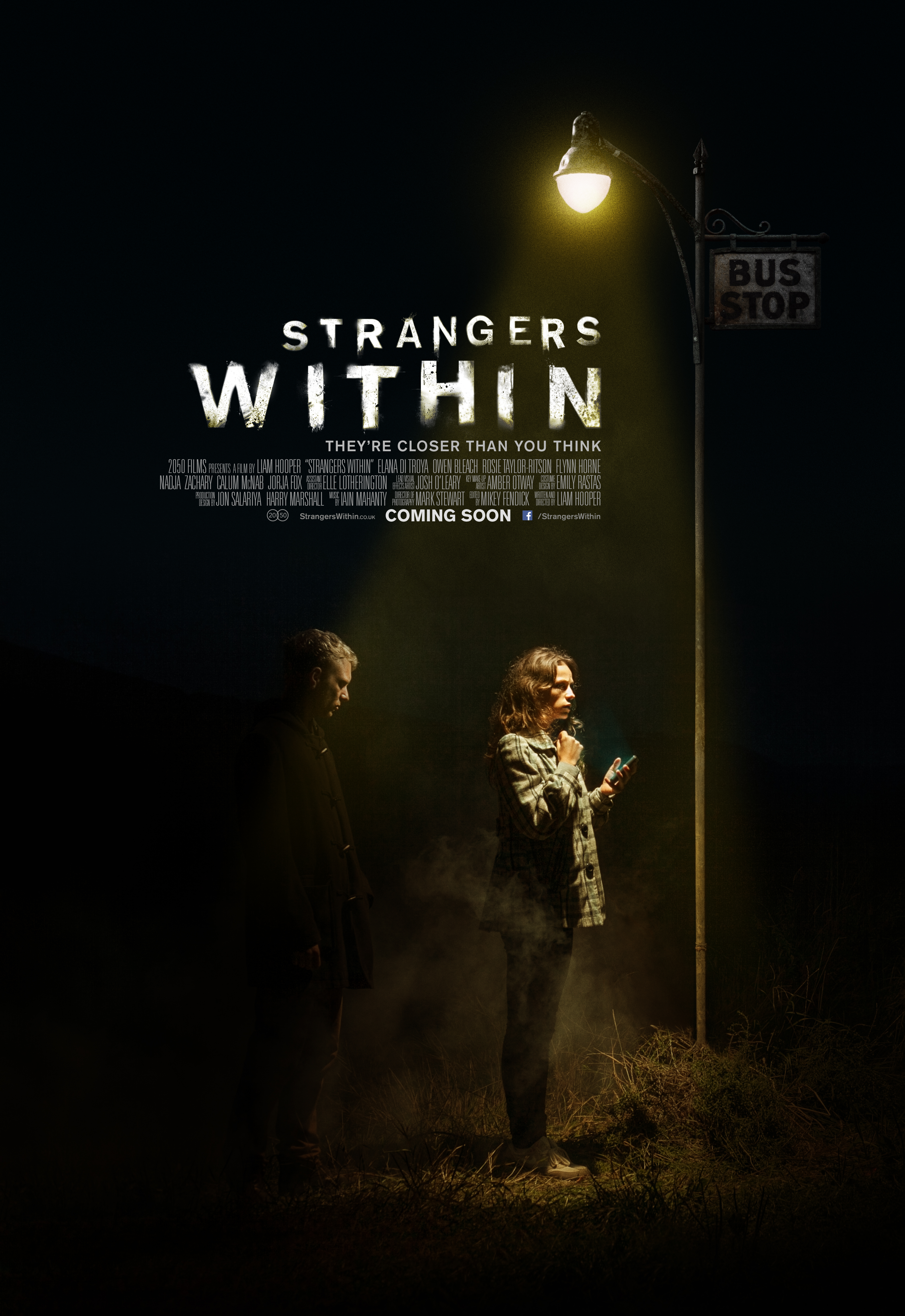
- Release poster 2017
- Directed by: Liam Hooper
- Screenplay by: Liam Hooper
- Produced by: Liam Hooper; Mark Stewart; Mikey Fendick
- Starring: Elana Di Troya; Owen Bleach; Rosie Taylor-Ritson; Flynn Horne; Nadja Zachary; Calum McNab; Jorja Fox; Jonathan Raggett
- Cinematography: Mark Stewart
- Edited by: Liam Hooper; Mikey Fendick
- Music by: Iain Mahanty
- Production company: 2050 Films
- Release date: 24 April 2017
- Country: United Kingdom
- Language: English

Strangers Within is a 2017 British home invasion horror film. The film stars Elana Di Troya as Sam, the daughter of a world-famous artist who is left home alone for a weekend. Joined by her three best friends, Sam hosts a casual gathering. This lasts barely an hour as one of the girls’ boyfriend arrives with two friends who have attended the gathering with an ulterior motive.

== Plot ==
Sam Templeton is a rich young woman whose father, Simon Templeton, operates a high-flying, yet shady, business. His wife, Martha, is an acclaimed painter, whose work flies off the auction block for large sums.

When left alone for a weekend, Sam invites her friends – Heidi, Alex and Ella - round for a sleepover. The get-together escalates into a full blown party with alcohol and lovemaking, as Heidi invites her boyfriend, Toby, and his friends.

Albeit amicable at first, the strangers in Sam’s house have a motive – to steal one of Martha's expensive paintings. As the job gets botched, a psychotic sadist emerges amongst them and a bloodied cat-and-mouse chase ensues.

== Cast ==
- Elana Di Troya as Sam
- Owen Bleach as Josh
- Rosie Taylor-Ritson as Ella
- Flynn Horne as Toby
- Nadja Zachary as Heidi
- Calum McNab as Matt
- Jorja Fox as Alex
- Jonathan Raggett as Mike
- Tony Burden as Simon Templeton
- Sam Chittenden as Martha Templeton
- Matt Robinson as The Auctioneer
- Neil James as Jack

== Production ==
=== Pre-production ===
"All the fear and tension comes from the characters and how they react to each other. There’s no killer running round slashing people with a machete."

—Liam Hooper, explaining his intents with the tension in the plot while directing Strangers Within.

The first draft of the screenplay was initially written in 2011 when the idea came to Hooper after a house party at the location where the film would eventually be shot. Hooper was determined to not write "another generic slasher" as he was "bored of the genre and wanted to mature it", saying "All the fear and tension comes from the characters and how they react to each other. There’s no killer running round slashing people with a machete." Pre-production began in early 2014, with reports surfacing in early June that Hooper was in talks to direct the film based on the screenplay that he'd begun writing in 2011, gave up on and subsequently rediscovered and perfected in 2013. This was later confirmed by 2050 Films, with the announcement of a vigorous Kickstarter campaign which saw the production raise £5000 through months of extensive promotion and marketing, before work on the film had even begun. After auditions held in Brighton, the lead cast were decided and confirmed, with McNab and Chittenden joining later on.

=== Production ===
Principal photography began in late August, 2014 in both Henfield and around the East Sussex area. It was shot using Canon C300 cameras provided by Ravensbourne University in London, of which members of the crew attend. A sneak peek teaser was released on Christmas Day, 2014 following an extensive advent calendar marketing campaign on the film's official Facebook page.

=== Music ===
The musical score for Strangers Within is being composed by Iain Mahanty, formerly the guitarist and songwriter of Welsh alt-rock band Kids in Glass Houses who approached 2050 Films during pre-production, looking to get involved with exciting film projects since the end of the band.

== Distribution ==
Strangers Within was released on 24 April 2017 on a home media DVD and VOD deal.

== Reception ==
One reviewer said of the film, "for a movie that obviously wants to be taken very seriously, this falls short in almost every department."
