= Forest Institute =

Former psychology school

Coordinates: 37°9′37.36″N 93°20′11.76″W

- Motto: Enrich. Advance. Serve.
- Type: Private University
- Active: 1979–2015
- President: Mark Skrade
- Location: 2885 West Battlefield Road, Springfield, Missouri, United States

The School of Professional Psychology at Forest Institute (1979–2015) provided an alternative to the traditional teaching Doctor of Psychology programs of education. The programs were designed for individuals desiring an education to prepare them to serve as direct providers of mental health services rather than researchers or academicians. Programs emphasize a holistic approach to mental wellness grounded in the science and practice of clinical psychology.

Forest Institute operated the Robert J. Murney Clinic in Springfield, Missouri and was one of the few graduate programs in the US to offer its students a free-standing clinic for practicum experience. This "classroom” provided services to members of the local community and offered students the opportunity to apply what they have learned in the classroom.

Forest also supported the Center for Innovation and Community Health, the Center for Continuing Education and numerous programs in the greater Springfield area. These programs are intended to fill needs for mental health services, training and consulting in the metro-area and the surrounding rural communities.

== History ==
The school was founded in 1975. In 2003, its national rank as a doctoral program in psychology in the United States (by volume of doctorates awarded) was 177 out of 200. In 2007, its enrollment totaled 221 students (nearly 75% of whom were women), and it awarded 66 doctoral degrees that year.

In December 2014, the school reported that it would close the following year. Both the president and acting president resigned that fall and a teach-out plan was submitted to the Higher Learning Commission. The school closed in the fall of 2015, citing financial difficulties following a continued lack of enrollment. Chapter 11 bankruptcy was filed on September 28, 2018 and a final decree was entered on April 2, 2020.

Transcripts and psychology internship/residency training records/ verifications are available through the Association of State and Provincial Psychology Boards (ASPPB) Closed Record Verification Service (CRVS).
