= Michael Aris =

British historian (1946–1999)

- Born: Michael Vaillancourt Aris; 27 March 1946; Havana, Cuba
- Died: 27 March 1999 (aged 53); Oxford, Oxfordshire, England
- Resting place: St. Mary and St. Peter Churchyard, Weedon Lois, South Northamptonshire, England
- Spouse: Aung San Suu Kyi (m. 1972)
- Children: 2, including Alexander Aris

Academic background
- Education: Durham University; School of Oriental and African Studies
- Thesis: A Study on the Historical Foundations of Bhutan, with a Critical Edition and Translation of Certain Bhutanese Texts in Tibetan (1978)
- Doctoral advisor: David Snellgrove

Michael Vaillancourt Aris (27 March 1946 – 27 March 1999) was a British historian who wrote and lectured on Bhutanese, Tibetan, and Himalayan culture and history. He was the husband of Aung San Suu Kyi, who would later become State Counsellor of Myanmar.

== Life ==
Aris was born in Havana, Cuba, son of British Council officer John Arundel Aris and Josette, daughter of Emile Vaillancourt, Canadian Ambassador to Cuba.

He was educated at Worth School in Sussex, and read modern history at Durham University, where he was a member of St Cuthbert's Society. After graduating in 1967, he spent six years as a private tutor to the children of the Bhutanese royal family.

In 1976, Aris moved on to the University of Oxford and became a junior research fellow and a member of the university faculty at St John's College. In 1978, he obtained a Ph.D. in Tibetan literature from SOAS (School of Oriental and African Studies). Later at St Antony's College, Oxford, he became a senior research fellow at the Asian Studies Centre. In the last years before his death, he helped establish a specialist Tibetan and Himalayan studies centre at Oxford.

Michael Aris's identical twin brother, Anthony Aris, similarly became a scholar of Tibetan studies, and founded Serindia Publications to focus on bringing Tibetan history and culture to modern audiences.

== Relationship with Aung San Suu Kyi ==
Having met at university, Aris and Aung San Suu Kyi were married in a Buddhist ceremony in 1972. After spending a year in Bhutan, they settled in North Oxford, where they raised their two sons, Alexander Aris and Kim Aris. During this time, Aris pursued his postgraduate studies at SOAS and obtained a PhD in Tibetan literature in 1978. In 1988, Aung San Suu Kyi returned to Burma, at first to care for her mother, but later to lead the country's pro-democracy movement. St John's College provided Aris with an extended leave of absence as a fellow on full stipend so that he could lobby for his wife's cause.

In 1997, Aris was diagnosed with prostate cancer which was later found to be terminal. Several countries, prominent individuals and organisations – including the United States government, UN Secretary-General Kofi Annan and Pope John Paul II – made appeals to the Burmese authorities to issue a visa for Aris. The Burmese government however refused this request, claiming a lack of adequate healthcare facilities and instead urging Aung San Suu Kyi to leave the country to visit him. Although Suu Kyi was at the time temporarily relieved from house arrest, she was unwilling to depart. Not trusting the junta's assurances, she feared her re-entry would be refused upon her return.

In the ten years following his wife's first house arrest in 1989, Aris would only see Suu Kyi another five times before his death in 1999. Their last meeting took place at Christmas 1995, when Suu Kyi had been released from house arrest.

== Death ==
Aris died of prostate cancer on his 53rd birthday in 1999, in Oxford.

== Publications ==
- Freedom from Fear and Other Writings: Revised Edition (Paperback) by Aung San Suu Kyi (Author), Václav Havel (Foreword), Desmond M. Tutu (Foreword), Michael Aris (Editor). Penguin (Non-Classics); Rev Sub edition (1 March 1996). ISBN 978-0-14-025317-7.
- Tibetan Studies in Honor of Hugh Richardson. Edited by Michael Aris and Aung San Suu Kyi. Preface by Michael Aris. (1979). Vikas Publishing house, New Delhi.
- "Notes on the History of the Mon-yul Corridor." In: * Tibetan Studies in Honour of Hugh Richardson, pp. 9–20. Edited by Michael Aris and Aung San Suu Kyi. (1979). Vikas Publishing house, New Delhi.
- Hidden Treasures and Secret Lives: A Study of Pemalingpa (1450–1521) and the Sixth Dalai Lama (1683–1706) (1450–1521 and the Sixth Dalai Lama). Kegan Paul; 1st edition (May 1989). ISBN 978-0-7103-0328-8.
- The Raven Crown: The Origins of Buddhist Monarchy in Bhutan (Hardcover). Serindia Publications (1 October 2005). ISBN 978-1-932476-21-7.
- Lamas, Princes, and Brigands: Joseph Rock's Photographs of the Tibetan Borderlands of China. Joseph F. Rock (Author), Michael Aris (Editor). 1st edition 1982. Reprint: China House Gallery. China Institute in America (June 1992). ISBN 978-0-295-97209-1.
- Bhutan, the Early History of a Himalayan Kingdom. (Aris & Phillips Central Asian Studies) (Paperback). Aris & Phillips (May 1979). ISBN 978-0-85668-199-8.
- Views of Medieval Bhutan: The Diary and Drawings of Samuel Davis 1783 (Hardcover). Roli Books International (1982).
- High Peaks, Pure Earth: Collected Writings on Tibetan History and Culture (Paperback) by Hugh Richardson (Author), Michael Aris (Author). Serindia Publications (October 1998). ISBN 978-0-906026-46-5.
- Ceremonies of the Lhasa Year (Heritage of Tibet) (Paperback) by Hugh Richardson (Author), Michael Aris (Editor). Serindia Publications (June 1994). ISBN 978-0-906026-29-8.
- Sources for the history of Bhutan (Wiener Studien zur Tibetologie und Buddhismuskunde) (Unknown Binding). Arbeitskreis für Tibetische und Buddhistische Studien, Universität Wien (1986).
- Tibetan studies and resources in Oxford. (6 pages only – unknown publisher and binding)
