= Alexander Aris =

British civil rights activist (born 1973)

- Myint San Aung မြင့်ဆန်းအောင်
- Born: Alexander Myint San Aung Aris; 12 April 1973 (age 53); London, England
- Education: Northern Illinois University
- Occupation: Civil rights activist
- Parents: Michael Aris (father); Aung San Suu Kyi (mother)
- Relatives: Aung San (grandfather); Khin Kyi (grandmother)

Alexander Myint San Aung Aris (Burmese: မြင့်ဆန်းအောင်, pronounced [mjɪ̰ɰ̃ sʰáɰ̃ àʊɰ̃]; born 12 April 1973) is the elder son of Aung San Suu Kyi and Michael Aris. He is also a grandson of Aung San, who is credited with achieving the independence of Myanmar (although he was assassinated in 1947, six months before the independence). He has been representing his mother, who has been detained by the military junta for years; he accepted the Nobel Peace Prize for her, and on many other awards and occasions, he has represented her.

== Early life ==
Aris was born on 12 April 1973 at Queen Charlotte's and Chelsea Hospital in Hammersmith, London to Aung San Suu Kyi and Michael Aris. His younger brother Kim Aris was born in 1977. His family home was in Park Town, North Oxford. In March 1988, his mother returned to Burma in order to nurse her dying mother Daw Khin Kyi, the wife of Aung San. She did not return to Oxford until June 2012, having been placed under house arrest in Burma for political reasons in 1989.

== Education ==
Aris was educated at two private schools in his home city of Oxford: at Dragon School, a co-educational preparatory school, followed by Magdalen College School, a senior school for boys, which he left in 1990. He graduated from Northern Illinois University in the United States and received a MSc in Mathematical Sciences.

== Life after mother's detention ==
In 1989, Alexander and his brother Kim were both stripped of their Burmese citizenships by the ruling junta (military government). The two brothers are British nationals. In 1988, when Kim Aris was only 11, his mother had to leave their home in Oxford to look after her dying mother in Burma.

In 1991, Alexander's mother Aung San Suu Kyi won the Nobel Peace Prize for her efforts in Burma. At the time, Alexander Aris (age 18) and his brother Kim Aris (age 14) accepted the prize on their mother's behalf. The Nobel Peace Prize's 1.3 million USD prize money was used to establish a health and education trust for the Burmese people. Over the years, Aris has accepted many awards and given many speeches on behalf of his mother. They include accepting The Award of the International Human Rights Law Group; welcoming the arrival of the Olympic Torch in Spain; and accepting the Presidential Medal of Freedom in the US.

After his father's death in 1999, Aris visited his mother for a short time. He is a psychologist in Portland, Oregon.
