= Martyrs' Mausoleum =

Mausoleum in Myanmar

- အာဇာနည်ဗိမာန်
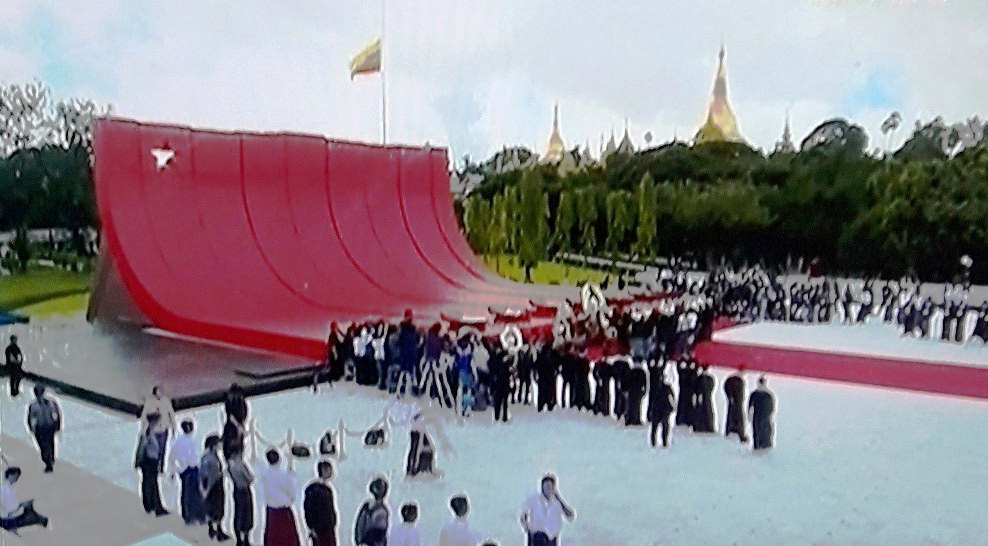
- Interactive map of Martyrs' Mausoleum
- Location: Bahan Township, Yangon, Myanmar
- Coordinates: 16.8025°N 96.1475°E
- Dedicated to: Aung San and his cabinet ministers

The Martyrs' Mausoleum (Burmese: အာဇာနည်ဗိမာန်) is a Mausoleum in Yangon, Myanmar (Burma), located near the northern gate of Shwedagon Pagoda. The mausoleum is dedicated to Aung San and other leaders of the pre-independence interim government, all of whom were assassinated on 19 July 1947. It is customary for high-ranking government officials to visit the mausoleum on 19 July to pay respects, and 19 July was designated as Martyrs' Day, a public holiday.

== Background ==
On 19 July 1947, at 10:37 a.m., BST, several of Burma's independence leaders were gunned down while they were holding a cabinet meeting at the Secretariat in downtown Rangoon. The assassinations were planned by a rival political group, and the leader and alleged mastermind of that group Galon U Saw, together with the perpetrators, were tried and convicted by a special tribunal.

The assassinated were:

1. Aung San, Prime Minister
2. Ba Cho, Minister of Information
3. Mahn Ba Khaing, Minister of Industry and Labor
4. Ba Win, Minister of Trade
5. Thakin Mya, Minister Without Portfolio, unofficially considered as Deputy Prime Minister of Burma
6. Abdul Razak, Minister of Education and National Planning
7. Sao San Tun, Minister of Hills Regions
8. Ohn Maung, Secretary of State Transport
9. Ko Htwe, Razak's bodyguard

Soon after the assassinations, Major General Sir Hubert Rance, the last British Governor of Burma, appointed U Nu to head an interim administration and when Burma became independent on 4 January 1948, Nu became the first Prime Minister of Burma. 19 July was designated a public holiday known as Martyr's Day.

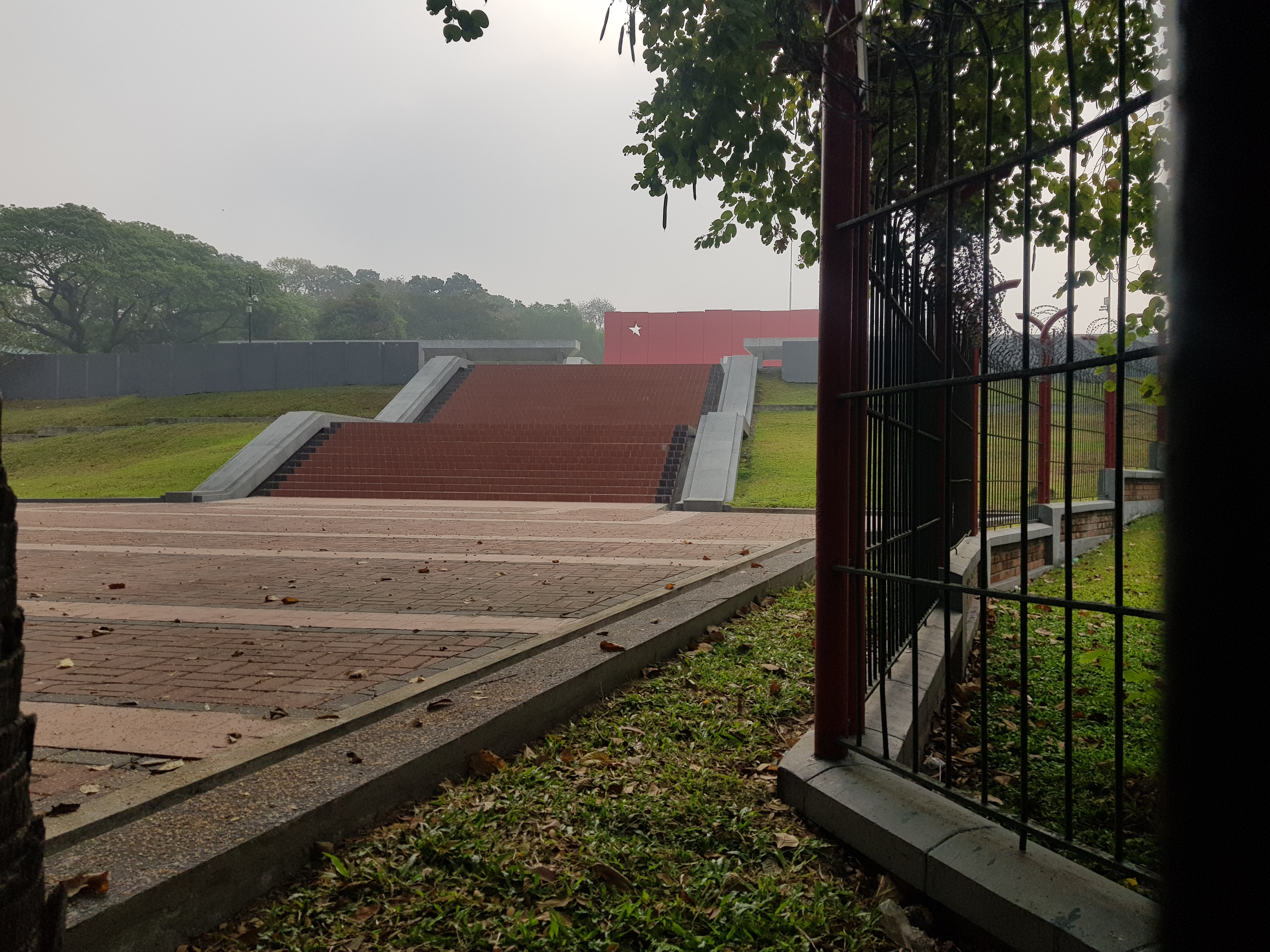
View of Martyrs’ Mausoleum from RZarni street

== List of burials ==
The mausoleum contains the remains of

1. Aung San
2. Thakin Mya
3. Ba Cho
4. Ba Win
5. Mahn Ba Khaing
6. Ohn Maung

The body of Sao San Tun was cremated in Mongpawn, his hometown, and the ashes were interred in his hometown and the Martyrs' Mausoleum. U Razak and Ko Htwe were interred in a Muslim cemetery in Tamwe Township.

== 1983 bombing ==
The mausoleum was destroyed by a bomb on 9 October 1983, an assassination attempt against Chun Doo-hwan, the fifth President of South Korea, orchestrated by North Korea. The blast ripped through the crowd killing 21 people and wounding 46 others. Fourteen South Korean ministers, presidential advisers, journalists, and security officials were killed; four Burmese nationals, including three journalists, were also among the dead. President Chun was saved because his car had been delayed in traffic and was only minutes from arriving at the memorial.

The mausoleum was rebuilt in 1985 under the military socialist dictatorship of Ne Win.

== Political significance ==
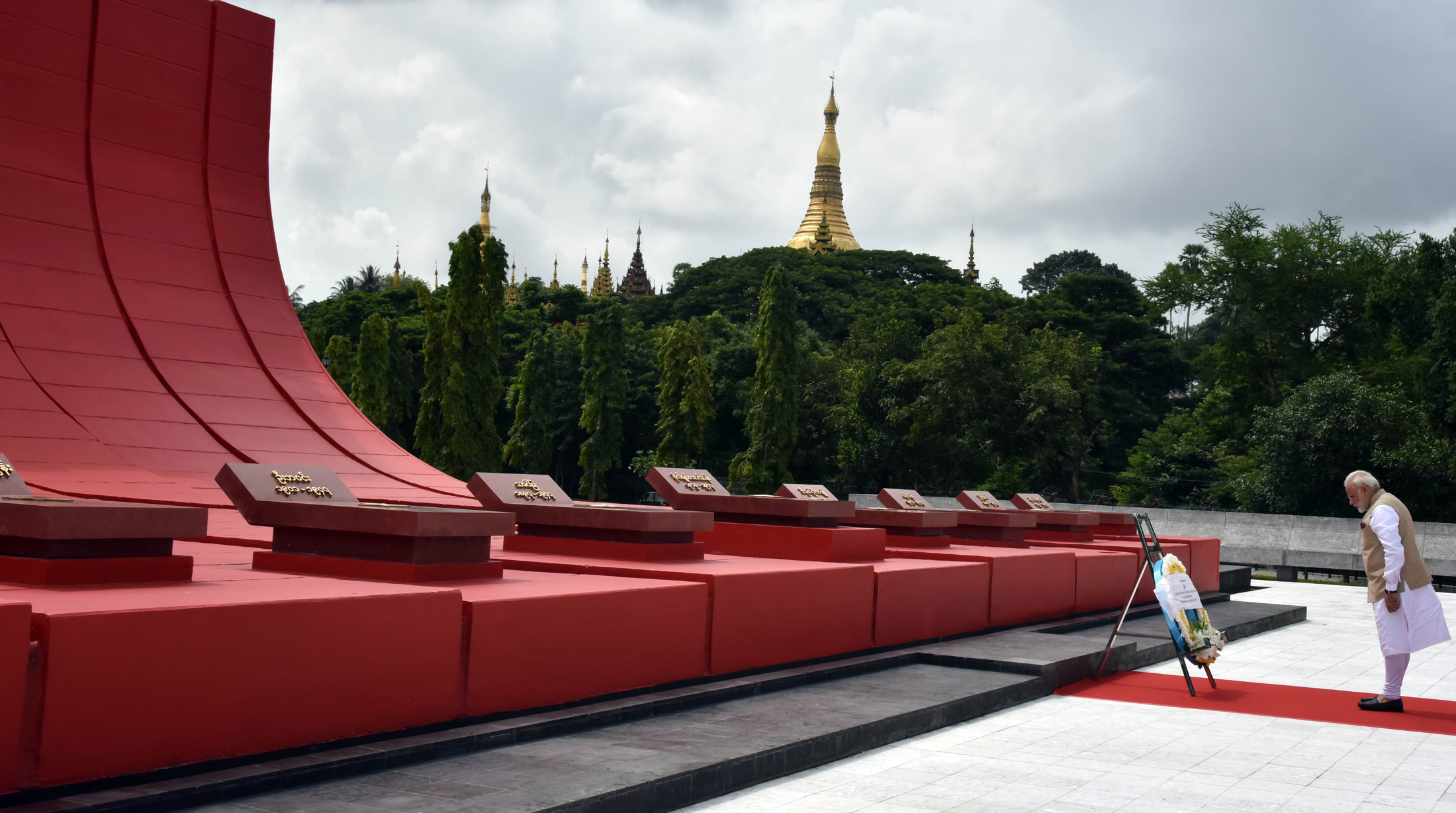
Prime Minister of India, Narendra Modi at the Martyrs’ Mausoleum

After the 1988 Uprising, the State Peace and Development Council junta downgraded the ceremony and the mausoleum became off-limits to ordinary people. Public access to the mausoleum was restricted until 2010 because the government was afraid of the public gathering at the mausoleum. Until 2011, the most senior official to attend the ceremony was the Yangon Mayor. In 2011, the government allowed the public to pay their respects at the mausoleum on Martyrs’ Day, drawing large, emotional crowds.
