= Mongpawn Palace =

Palace in Shan State, Myanmar

- မိုင်းပွန်ဟော်နန်း
- Interactive map of the Mongpawn Palace area

General information
- Location: Mongpawn, Shan State, Myanmar
- Coordinates: 20.814°N 97.457°E

Mongpawn Palace, also known as the Mongpawn Haw (Shan: ႁေႃၸဝ်ႈၾႃႉမိူင်းပွၼ်) or Maingpun Haw (Burmese: မိုင်းပွန်ဟော်နန်း), is the former residence of the local ruler of Mongpawn State, a small principality in modern-day Myanmar (Burma). It is best known for being the residence of Sao San Htun, a national martyr who was assassinated in 1947, now commemorated as Martyrs' Day.

== History ==
The palace was built c. 1887 by Sao Khun Ti as a large wooden structure built atop stone stilts.

The property fell into disuse after the 1962 Burmese coup d'état. For years, local monasteries attempted to raise funds to renovate the derelict palace.

In 2020, the Burmese military announced plans to renovate the palace. Renovations were completed on 5 February 2021.
