= Sao Hkun Hkio =

- စဝ်ခွန်ချို

Deputy Prime Minister of Burma
- In office 1950–1958
- Prime Minister: U Nu; Ba Swe
- Preceded by: Ne Win
- Succeeded by: Thein Maung

Deputy Prime Minister of Burma
- In office 1960–1962
- Prime Minister: U Nu
- Preceded by: Lun Baw

4th Minister of Foreign Affairs
- In office 1950–1958
- Prime Minister: U Nu Ba Swe
- Preceded by: E Maung
- Succeeded by: Thein Maung

4th Minister of Foreign Affairs
- In office 1960–1962
- Prime Minister: U Nu
- Preceded by: Thein Maung
- Succeeded by: Thi Han

Saopha of Möngmit
- In office 1936–1959
- Preceded by: Sao Khin Maung Gye
- Succeeded by: position abolished

Personal details
- Born: 19 August 1912
- Died: 21 October 1990 (aged 78)
- Spouse: Beatrice Mabel Hkio
- Education: University of Cambridge

Sao Hkun Hkio (Burmese: စဝ်ခွန်ချို, pronounced [saʊ kʰʊ̀ɴ tɕʰò]; 19 August 1912 – 21 October 1990) was a Burmese political figure and diplomat who served as acting Foreign Minister of Myanmar in 1948, 4th Foreign Minister of Myanmar (1950–1958, & 1960–1962) as well as Deputy Prime Minister of Burma in the era of 1st Prime Minister of Burma U Nu. He was known for being the longest serving Foreign Minister of Myanmar. He additionally served as the last Saopha of Möngmit from 1936 to 1952. His elder brother-in-law, Sao San Tun was the Saopha of Mongpawn who was assassinated along with General Aung San, father of modern-day Burma who served as 5th Premier of British Burma Crown Colony from 26 September 1946 to 19 July 1947.

== Personal life ==
He notably received his education at Framlingham College and got BA degree in 1934 from the University of Cambridge in the United Kingdom, reportedly meeting his wife Beatrice Mabel Hkio while dog-walking on Parker's Piece.

He had 4 children, 2 boys and 2 girls, all of whom grew up and lived in England.
