= Martyrs' Day (Myanmar) =

Public holiday in Myanmar, July 19

Martyrs' Day အာဇာနည်နေ့
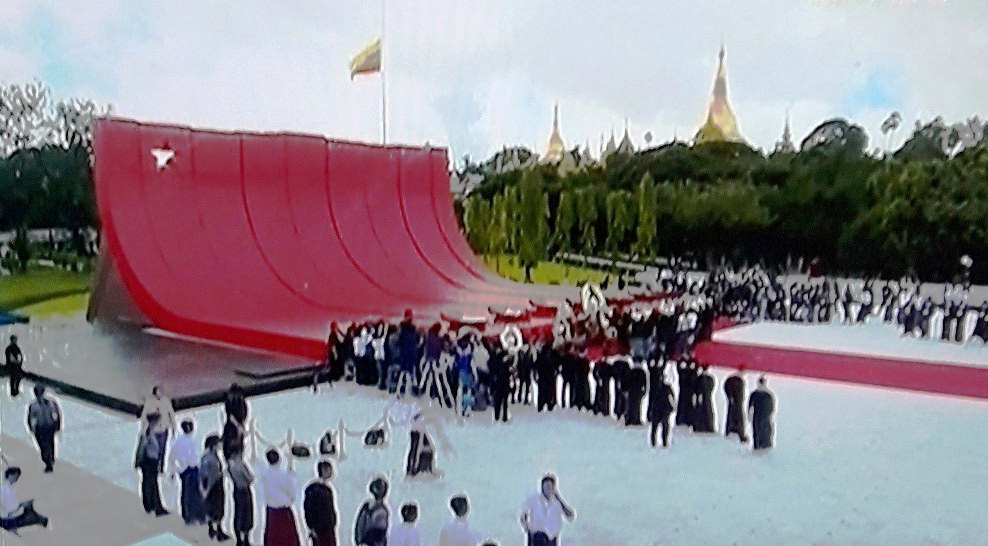
- Martyrs' Mausoleum
- Observed by: Myanmar
- Type: National holiday
- Date: 19 July
- Next time: 19 July 2027
- Frequency: annual

Martyrs' Day (Burmese: အာဇာနည်နေ့, pronounced [ʔàzànì nḛ]) is a Burmese national holiday observed on 19 July to commemorate Gen. Aung San and seven other leaders of the pre-independence interim government, and one bodyguard—Thakin Mya, Ba Cho, Abdul Razak, Ba Win, Mahn Ba Khaing, Sao San Tun, Ohn Maung and Ko Htwe—all of whom were assassinated on that day in 1947. It is customary for high-ranking government officials to visit the Martyrs' Mausoleum in Yangon in the morning of that day to pay respects.

Myoma U Than Kywe led the ceremony of the First Burmese Martyrs' Day on 19 July 1947 in Rangoon.

== History ==
On 19 July 1947, at approximately 10:37 a.m., BST, several of Burma's independence leaders were gunned down by a group of armed men in uniform while they were holding a cabinet meeting at the Secretariat in downtown Yangon. The assassinations were planned by a rival political group, and the leader and alleged mastermind of that group Galon U Saw, together with the perpetrators, were tried and convicted by a special tribunal presided by Kyaw Myint with two other Barristers-at-law, Aung Thar Gyaw and Si Bu. In a judgment given on 30 December 1947 the tribunal sentenced U Saw and a few others to death and the rest were given prison sentences.

Appeals to the High Court of Burma by U Saw and his accomplices were rejected on 8 March 1948. In a judgment written by Supreme Court Justice E Maung (1898–1977) on 27 April 1948, the Supreme Court refused leave to appeal against the original judgment. All the judgments of the tribunal, the High Court, and the Supreme Court were written in English. (Note: The judgment of the tribunal can be read in A Trial in Burma by Dr Maung Maung (Martinus Nijhoff, 1963), and the judgment of the High Court and Supreme Court can be read in the 1948 Burma Law Reports.)

Then-President of Burma Sao Shwe Thaik refused to pardon or commute the sentences of most of those who were sentenced to death, and U Saw was hanged inside Rangoon's Insein jail on 8 May 1948. A number of perpetrators met the same fate, while minor players, who were sentenced to various terms of imprisonment, also spent several years in prison.

The assassinated people were:

1. Aung San, Prime Minister
2. Ba Cho, Minister of Information
3. Mahn Ba Khaing, Minister of Industry and Labor
4. Ba Win, Minister of Trade
5. Thakin Mya, Minister Without Portfolio, unofficially considered as Deputy Prime Minister of Burma
6. Abdul Razak, Minister of Education and National Planning
7. Sao San Tun, Minister of Hills Regions
8. Ohn Maung, Secretary of State Transport
9. Ko Htwe, Razak's bodyguard

Tin Tut, Minister of Finance, and Kyaw Nyein, Minister of Home Affairs, were not present at the meeting. Additionally, one of the assassins, Ba Nyunt, went to the office of Chamber of Deputies Speaker U Nu, who was not present because of a leave of absence due to minor illness. Ba Nyunt could not find U Nu. Later Ba Nyunt became the government witness in the trial process.

Many Burmese believe that the British were somehow involved in the assassination plot; two British officers were also arrested at the time and one of them charged and convicted for supplying an agent of U Saw with arms and munitions. A large part of the stockpile, which was enough to equip a small army, was recovered from a lake next to U Saw's house in the immediate aftermath of the shooting.

Soon after the assassinations, Major General Sir Hubert Rance, the last British Governor of Burma, appointed U Nu to head an interim administration and when Burma became independent on 4 January 1948, Nu became the first Prime Minister of Burma. 19 July was designated a public holiday known as Martyrs' Day.

== Commemorations ==
=== Poem for Martyr's Day ===
Aung San Zarni

The birthday of General Aung San is in February 13.
1915, son of Lawyer U Hpa
Born on Natmauk, Magwe District
known to this day.
His Mother's name is Daw Suu.
in 1947, he was assassinated
On 19 July everyone wept
He is the Hero of the Union
and Father of the Nation
And his words he has said ...
How can we ever forget

အောင်ဆန်းဇာနည်
ဖေဖေါ်ဝါရီ ဆယ့်သုံး မှာ
ဗိုလ်ချုပ်မွေးနေ့ပါ၊
တစ်ထောင့်ကိုးရာတစ်ဆယ့်ငါး
ရှေ့နေ ဦးဖာသား၊
ဇာတိ နတ်မောက် မကွေးခရိုင်
သိကြများ ခုတိုင်၊
ကြံ့ကြံ့ခိုင်လို့ ဇာနည်ဘွား
မိခင်ဒေါ်စုသား၊
တစ်ထောင့်ကိုးရာလေးဆယ့်ခွန်
ပြောင်းကြွ တမလွန်၊
မျက်ရည်သွန်လို့ ဘဝင်ညှိုး
ဇူလိုင် တစ်ဆယ့်ကိုး။
ပြည်ထောင်စုရဲ့ ကျေးဇူးရှင်
ဗိုလ်ချုပ် တို့ဖခင်၊
ကောင်းစေချင်တဲ့ မှာစကား
ငါတို့ မမေ့အား။

== See also ==
- History of Burma
- Panglong Conference
