= Mahn Ba Khaing =

Burmese politician

- မန်းဘခိုင်
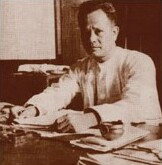

Minister of Industry and Labour of Burma
- In office September 1946 – 19 July 1947
- Prime Minister: Aung San
- Preceded by: New Office

Personal details
- Born: 26 October 1903 Hinthada, British Burma
- Died: 19 July 1947 (aged 43) Yangon, British Burma
- Resting place: Martyrs' Mausoleum, Myanmar
- Party: AFPFL
- Relations: Mahn Win Khaing Than (grandson)
- Profession: Politician

Mahn Ba Khaing (Burmese: မန်းဘခိုင် [máɰ̃ ba̰ kʰàɪɰ̃]; 26 October 1903 – 19 July 1947) was a Karen politician who served as the Minister of Industry and Labour in Burma's pre-independence government. He was assassinated on 19 July 1947, alongside Prime Minister Aung San, the father of Aung San Suu Kyi, and was recognized as one of the nine Burmese national martyrs.

Mahn Win Khaing Than, acting Vice President of Myanmar, is one of his grandchildren.

== Early life and education ==
Born in Yontalin Village, Hinthada Township, Ayeyarwady Region on 26 October 1903, Mahn Ba Khaing was the fifth son of Mahn Pe Kone, the village head, and Daw Pu. He was educated at the American Baptist Missionary School in Hinthada before leaving the school in 1920.

== Political career and death ==
Mahn Ba Khaing was elected as a parliamentarian for northern Pathein region in 1937. He served as chairman of the Karen Youth Organisation. When the Aung San-led interim government was formed in 1946, Mahn Ba Khaing was appointed as the Minister of Industry and Labour.

He and eight others (including Prime Minister Aung San) were assassinated on 19 July 1947 in Ministers' Building in Yangon (nowadays Secretariat Yangon).
