= Ba Cho =

Burmese journalist, one of 9 martyrs

Dedok U Ba Cho
- ဒီးဒုတ်ဦးဘချို

Minister of Information
- In office September 1946 – 19 July 1947
- Prime Minister: Aung San
- Preceded by: New Office

President of Trade Union Congress (Burma)
- In office November 1945 – July 1947
- Preceded by: New Office

Personal details
- Born: 24 April 1893 Myaungmya, British Burma
- Died: 19 July 1947 (aged 54) Yangon, British Burma
- Resting place: Martyrs' Mausoleum, Myanmar
- Party: AFPFL
- Spouse: Hla May (လှမေ)
- Children: Mya Mya
- Education: University of Rangoon
- Profession: journalist, publisher

Ba Cho (Burmese: ဘချို, pronounced [ba̰ tɕʰò]; 24 April 1893 – 19 July 1947), known honorifically as Dedok U Ba Cho, was a Burmese newspaper publisher and politician who served as the Minister of Information in Myanmar's pre-independence government. Ba Cho and six other cabinet ministers (including Prime Minister Aung San) were assassinated on 19 July 1947 in Yangon. 19 July is commemorated each year as the Martyrs' Day in Myanmar.

Ba Cho was also president of Trade Union Congress of Burma.
