= Ba Win =

Burmese politician (1901–1947)

His Excellency U Ba Win
- ဘဝင်း
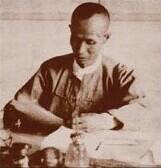

Minister of Trade
- In office September 1946 – 19 July 1947
- Preceded by: New Office

Personal details
- Born: 10 June 1901 Natmauk, British Raj
- Died: 19 July 1947 (aged 46) Yangon, British Burma
- Resting place: Martyrs' Mausoleum, Myanmar
- Party: Anti-Fascist People's Freedom League (AFPFL)
- Spouse: Khin Saw
- Children: Tin Hla Win; Saw Win; Aye Win; Khin Mya Win; Sein Win; Htwe Win
- Relatives: Aung San (brother); Aung San Oo (nephew); Aung San Suu Kyi (niece)
- Education: University of Rangoon
- Profession: Headmaster

Ba Win (Burmese: ဘဝင်း); born San Tin (Burmese: စံတင်); 10 June 1901 – 19 July 1947), best known as U Ba Win (Burmese: ဦးဘဝင်း), was a Burmese politician, and Minister of Trade in the Interim Government of Burma. He was the eldest brother of General Aung San, and was assassinated together with his youngest brother during an Executive Council meeting on 19 July 1947. 19 July is commemorated each year as the Martyrs' Day in Myanmar (Burma).

== Biography ==
He was born San Tin (စံတင်), on 10 June 1901 in Natmauk to U Pha, a lawyer, and his wife Daw Suu. He was the eldest of nine children. He studied at Sayagyi U Wa Gyi School in Natmauk, and received a bachelor's degree from the University of Rangoon. He became a teacher at the National School in Taungdwingyi. In 1936 he married Khin Saw, daughter of U Ant, a lawyer and landowner and Daw Shwe May. He became the headmaster at the National School in Phyu from 1941 to 1942. He was Minister of Ministry of Trade.

He was survived by his wife Khin Saw and six children.
