= Burma Muslim Congress =

Islamic political party in Myanmar

- Abbreviation: BMC
- First president: U Razak
- Last president: U Than Myint
- Founded: December 1945
- National affiliation: AFPFL (1945–56); National United Front (1958–60)

The Burma Muslim Congress (BMC) was a Muslim political party in Burma (present-day Myanmar).

== History ==
The party was founded around the same time as the Anti-Fascist People's Freedom League (AFPFL), which it became affiliated with in December 1945. The party's first president, U Razak, became president of the AFPFL's Mandalay branch in 1946. Razak was subsequently appointed Minister of Education and Planning in Aung San's government, a post he held until he was assassinated alongside San.

Following Razak's death, secretary-general U Khin Maung Lat succeeded him as party president. He became a member of the AFPFL Supreme Council, and was appointed Minister of Justice in 1950, a post he held until 1958. A few months after independence in 1948, new Prime Minister U Nu requested that the BMC leave the AFPFL. In response, U Khin Maung Lat decided to discontinue the party's Islamic religious activities and rejoin the AFPFL. In 1954 the AFPFL Supreme Council asked the party to fully merge into the AFPFL and cease to exist as a separate organisation. Although this request was initially refused, the party did merge in 1956.

The party was immediately re-established by U Than Myint, who moved it to the left. It joined the National United Front alliance in 1958, but left in 1960, changing its name to Pathi Congress and began campaigning for a separate state for Burmese Muslims, before haemorrhaging support.
