= Sao San Htun =

Burmese politician

- ၸဝ်ႈၸၢမ်ႇထုၼ်း စဝ်စံထွန်း
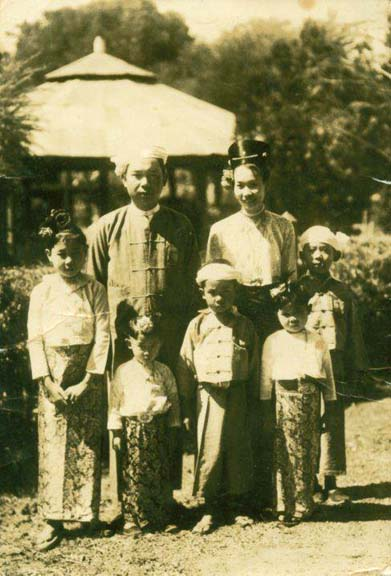

Saopha of Mongpawn
- In office 27 June 1928 – 20 July 1947
- Preceded by: Sao Khun Htee
- Succeeded by: Sao Hsè Hom

Minister of Hill Regions
- In office September 1946 – 20 July 1947
- Prime Minister: Aung San
- Preceded by: New Office

Personal details
- Born: 30 May 1907 Mongpawn, Federated Shan States, British Burma
- Died: 20 July 1947 (aged 40) Yangon, British Burma
- Resting place: Martyrs' Mausoleum, Yangon
- Spouse: Sao Khin Thaung
- Children: 4
- Relatives: Sao Hkun Hkio (brother-in-law); Sai Sai Kham Hlaing (great-grandson)
- Profession: Saopha

Sao San Htun (Shan: ၸဝ်ႈၸၢမ်ႇထုၼ်း, Burmese: စဝ်စံထွန်း, Burmese pronunciation: [saʔ sàɰ̃ tʰʊ́ɰ̃]; 30 May 1907 – 20 July 1947) was the hereditary chief (called a saopha or sawbwa) of the Shan State of Mongpawn, and Minister of Hill Regions in Myanmar's pre-independence interim government. He was the son of former sawbwa Sao Hkun Hti and Nang Sein Oo.

== Family Life ==
Sao San Htun had four children with Mahadewi Sao Khin Thaung. They were Sao Hsè Hom, the next sawbwa, Sao Kai Hpa (son), Sao Sunanda (daughter), and Sao Myint Gyi (daughter).

== Political Contributions ==
Sao San Htun was a signatory to the Panglong Agreement, which was the basis for the formation of modern Myanmar.

== Assassination ==
On 19 July 1947, Sao San Htun, along with Aung San and seven others, was shot by gunmen during a cabinet meeting at the Secretariat complex in downtown Yangon. He died the next day on 20 July at noon. The date of the assassination, 19 July, is commemorated each year as the Martyrs' Day in Myanmar.
