= Ohn Maung =

Burmese politician (1913–1947)

- အုန်းမောင်
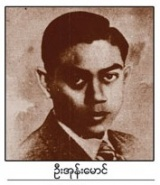

Permanent secretary of Transport
- In office September 1946 – 19 July 1947
- Prime Minister: Aung San
- Preceded by: New Office

Personal details
- Born: 2 February 1913 Minbu, British Burma
- Died: 19 July 1947 (aged 34) Yangon, British Burma
- Resting place: Martyrs' Mausoleum, Myanmar
- Party: AFPFL
- Spouse: Daw Thein Kywe
- Education: B.A.
- Alma mater: University of Rangoon
- Profession: Deputy District Administrator

Ohn Maung (Burmese: အုန်းမောင် [ʔóʊɰ̃ màʊɰ̃]; 2 February 1913 – 19 July 1947) was a Burmese civil servant who served as the Permanent secretary of Transport in Burma's pre-independence government. He, along with seven other cabinet ministers (including Prime Minister Aung San), was assassinated on 19 July 1947 in Yangon. 19 July is commemorated each year as the Martyrs' Day in Myanmar.
