= Bo Min Yaung =

Burmese guerrilla leader against British colonial government

- Born: 1837
- Died: 1887 (aged 49–50)
- Other names: Shwe La Yaung

Bo Min Yaung (Burmese: ဗိုလ်မင်းရောင်), also known by his title as Shwe La Yaung (Burmese: ရွှေလရောင်), was a Burmese official during the late Konbaung dynasty who served as a royal treasurer under King Mindon and King Thibaw. He was best known as a guerrilla leader against the British colonization of Burma. A statue of Bo Min Yaung stands before his native town.

== Early life ==
Maung Min Yaung, the eldest of four siblings, was born in 1837 in Myolulin Village, Taungdwingyi to U Hmue and Daw Po. His family traced their lineage from the royal family of the Pagan Kingdom through its last king, Narathihapate. He was a maternal grandfather of General Aung San, Burma's independence leader.

He later served under King Mindon who awarded him the title of "Maha Min Kyaw Min Htin" which is an honorary title similar to knighthood, expressing favour from the king, given to those who are not close relatives of the Burmese royal family. He had a reputation for having a gentle and soft personality.

Bo Min Yaung was popular in his hometown for his handsomeness, strength, writing ability, and swordsmanship which he practiced every day. King Mindon employed him in the diplomatic service, and by the reign of Burma's last king, Thibaw, he had been appointed to administer the region of Myo Lu Lin, close to the northern side of the Pegu Mountain Range in Upper Burma.

== Career as a guerrilla leader ==
After learning of King Thibaw's abdication and subsequent exile to western India following the brief Third Anglo-Burmese War in 1885 he made up his mind to resist the British.

Bo Min Yaung began his rebellion by gathering local soldiers from the region he had governed, taking the nom de guerre "King Shwelayaung" (lit. 'King Golden Moon'). He operated from a base area near Myint Ma Nie Mountain where he built a temporary palace and a wooden fort in the area, often conducting raids and attacks on nearby British forces. Eventually British pressure forced him to abandon that base and relocate to the area around Taungdwingyi (now in the division of Magway). He built a fort near Lay Taing Sin, 22 miles from where Aung San was born.

Bo Min Yaung continued to attack British forces in the area, but eventually the British defeated and captured him.

== Death and legacy ==
After his capture, the British officer in charge (remembered as "Captain Gyan Daw" by Daw Thu Sa) told him that they would release him and allow him to be the governor of Taungdwingyi as long as he agreed to stop fighting the British, but Bo Min Yaung refused, saying that he would not give obeisance to foreigners as if they had the authority of the Burmese royal family. After this refusal, the British soldiers beheaded Bo Min Yaung. His severed head was put on display in Magwe’s Natmauk as a warning to the Burmese.

The Bo Min Yaung Road, Bo Min Yaung Quarter and Bo Min Yaung Building Project are named in honor of him.

== In popular culture ==
- Portrayed by Zaw Oo in Never Shall We Be Enslaved (1997)
- Portrayed by Lu Min in the delaying Aung San film.
