= Ministry of Foreign Affairs (Myanmar) =

Government ministry of Myanmar

- နိုင်ငံခြားရေး ဝန်ကြီးဌာန
- Official Seal of the Ministry of Foreign Affairs

Agency overview
- Formed: 17 March 1947 (Department), 25 May 1967 (Ministry)
- Preceding agencies: Department of Foreign Affairs; Foreign Office
- Jurisdiction: Government of Myanmar
- Headquarters: Office No (9), Naypyidaw; 19.7534296°N 96.1192157°E
- Minister responsible: U Tin Maung Swe, Union Minister for Foreign Affairs
- Child agencies: Political Department; ASEAN Affairs Department; Strategic Studies and Training Department; Protocol Department; International Organizations and Economic Department; Consular and Legal Affairs Department; Planning and Administrative Department
- Website: www.mofa.gov.mm

The Ministry of Foreign Affairs (Burmese: နိုင်ငံခြားရေး ဝန်ကြီးဌာန, [nàɪɰ̃ŋàɰ̃dʑájé wʊ̀ɰ̃dʑí tʰàna̰], 'MOFA') is a ministry in the government of Myanmar responsible for the country's foreign relations. It also operates embassies and consulates in 44 countries. It is headed by U Tin Maung Swe.

== List of ministers ==
No.	Name	Term of office			Political party
No.	Name	Took office	Left office	Time in office	Political party
=== Pre-independence British Burma ===
–	Aung San	17 March 1946	19 July 1947	1 year, 124 days	Military
–	U Nu	19 July 1947	1 August 1947	13 days	Anti-Fascist People's Freedom League
–	Lun Baw	1 August 1947	30 October 1947	90 days	Anti-Fascist People's Freedom League
–	Tin Htut	30 October 1947	16 August 1948	291 days	Anti-Fascist People's Freedom League
=== Union of Burma (1948–1974) ===
1	Sao Hkun Hkio	16 August 1948	14 September 1948	29 days	Independent
2	Kyaw Nyein	14 September 1948	31 March 1949	198 days	Anti-Fascist People's Freedom League
(1)	Sao Hkun Hkio	31 March 1949	5 April 1949	5 days	Independent
3	E Maung	5 April 1949	20 December 1949	249 days	Anti-Fascist People's Freedom League
(1)	Sao Hkun Hkio	10 December 1949	28 October 1958	8 years, 322 days	Independent
4	Thein Maung	28 October 1958	27 February 1959	122 days	Military
5	Chan Tun Aung	27 February 1959	4 April 1960	1 year, 37 days	Military
(1)	Sao Hkun Hkio	4 April 1960	1 March 1962	1 year, 331 days	Independent
6	Thi Han	2 March 1962	19 June 1969	7 years, 108 days	Military
7	Maung Lwin	18 June 1969	4 August 1970	1 year, 47 days	Military
8	Hla Han	4 August 1970	20 April 1972	1 year, 260 days	Military
9	U Kyaw Soe	20 April 1972	2 March 1974	1 year, 316 days	Military
=== Socialist Republic of the Union of Burma (1974–1988) ===
10	Hla Phone	2 March 1974	3 March 1978	4 years, 1 day	Burma Socialist Programme Party
11	Myint Maung	3 March 1978	18 March 1980	2 years, 15 days	Burma Socialist Programme Party
12	Lay Maung	18 March 1980	9 November 1981	1 year, 236 days	Burma Socialist Programme Party
13	Chit Hlaing	9 November 1981	4 November 1985	3 years, 360 days	Burma Socialist Programme Party
14	Ye Gaung	4 November 1985	18 September 1988	2 years, 319 days	Burma Socialist Programme Party
=== Union of Myanmar (1988–2011) ===
15	Saw Maung	18 September 1988	17 September 1991	2 years, 364 days	Military
16	Ohn Gyaw	18 September 1991	15 November 1998	6 years, 58 days	Independent
17	Win Aung	15 November 1998	18 September 2004	5 years, 308 days	Military
18	Nyan Win	18 September 2004	30 March 2011	6 years, 193 days	Military
=== Republic of the Union of Myanmar (2011–present) ===
19	Wunna Maung Lwin	30 March 2011	30 March 2016	5 years	Union Solidarity and Development Party
20	Aung San Suu Kyi	30 March 2016	1 February 2021	4 years, 308 days	National League for Democracy
(19)	Wunna Maung Lwin	1 February 2021	1 February 2023	2 years	Union Solidarity and Development Party
21	Than Swe	1 February 2023	10 April 2026	3 years, 68 days	
22	U Tin Maung Swe	10 April 2026	Incumbent	120 days	

== History ==
During World War II, the British administration retreated to India. In 1942, the foreign affairs is served by Defence Department. After World War II, Defence and External Affairs Department was established and directly served by counsellor of the governor.

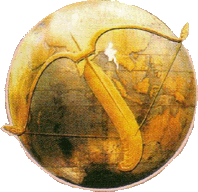
The former Seal

In 1946, it was under the executive council and served by General Aung San, the vice chair of that council. Later, the Myanmar Representatives led by General Aung San and British Government agreed to act the foreign cases according to Myanmar.

The Department of Foreign Affairs was established on 17 March 1947 under General Aung San. The first secretary was Shwe Baw.

On 4 May 1948, it was renamed Foreign Office and the secretary became permanent secretary. On 25 May 1967, it became Ministry of Foreign Affairs.

== Departments and heads of departments ==
- Permanent Secretary: Aung Kyaw Moe
- Director General:ASEAN Affairs Department: Dr. Khin Thidar Aye
- Director General:Consular and Legal Affairs Department: Aung Kyaw Oo
- Director General:Political Department: Than Htwe
- Director General:International Organizations and Economic Department: Kyaw Nyunt Oo (Acting)
- Director General:Planning and Administrative Department: Kyaw Tin Shein
- Director General:Protocol Department: Zaw Tun Oo (Acting)
- Director General:Strategic Studies and Training Department: Zaw Phyo Win

== List of deputy ministers ==
1. Hla Phone (1969–1974)
2. U Win (1974–1978)
3. Tin Ohn (1978–1983)
4. Hla Shwe (1983–1985)
5. Saw Hlaing (1985–1988)
6. Ohn Gyaw (1989–1991)
7. Khin Maung Win (1991–2004)
8. Kyaw Thu (2003–2009)
9. Maung Myint (2004–2012)
10. Myo Myint (2011–2012)
11. Thant Kyaw (2012–2016)
12. Zinyaw (2012–2014)
13. Tin Oo Lwin (2014–2016)
14. Kyaw Tin (2016–2017)
15. Kyaw Myo Htut (2021–2024 January)
16. Lwin Oo (2023–present)

== See also ==
- Foreign relations of Myanmar
