= Thakin Mya =

Burmese politician (1897 – 1947)

- သခင်မြ
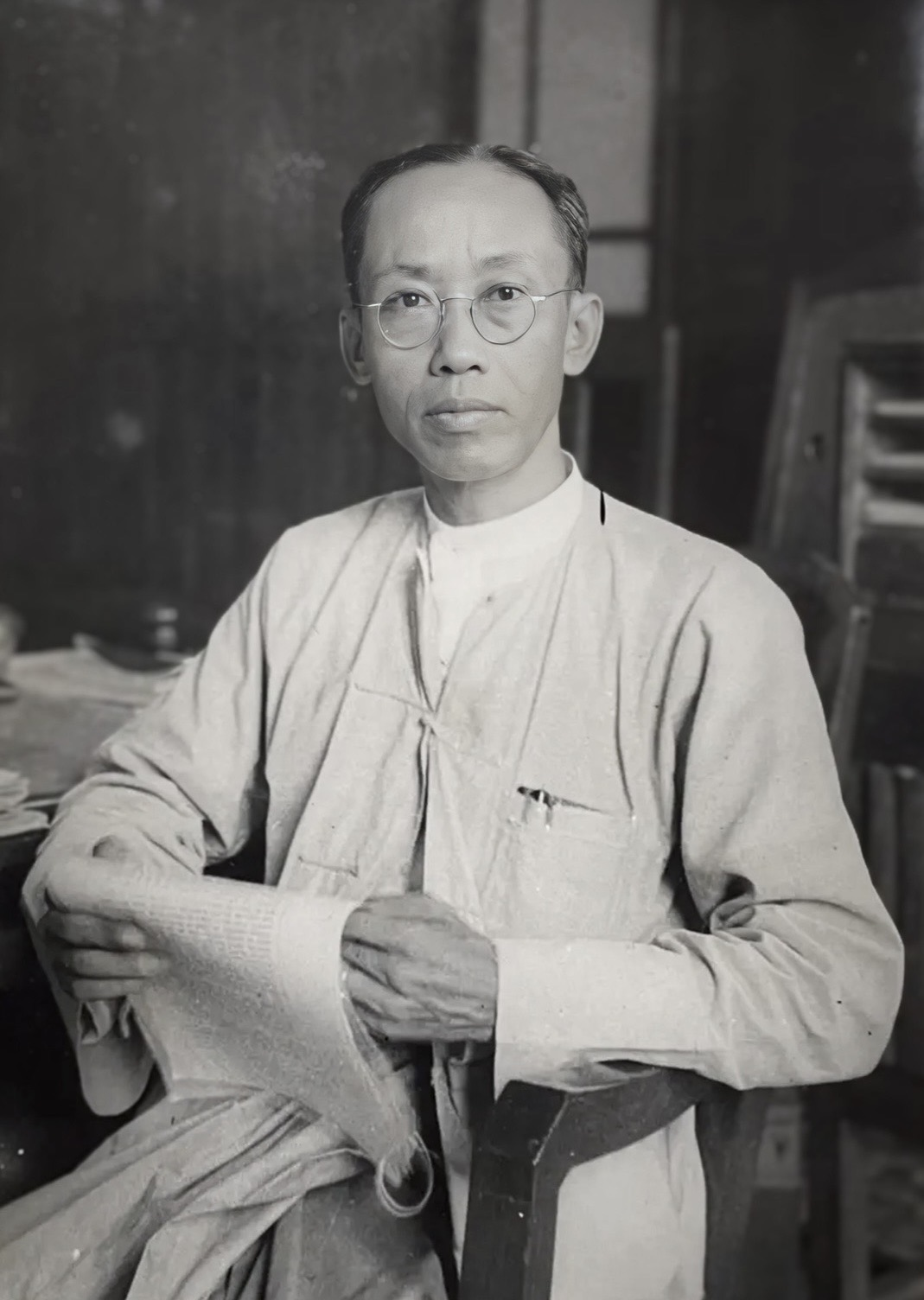

Minister of Home Affairs
- In office September 1946 – 10 June 1947
- Prime Minister: Aung San

Minister of Finance
- In office 10 June 1947 – 19 July 1947
- Prime Minister: Aung San
- Preceded by: U Tin Tut
- Succeeded by: U Tin Tut

Personal details
- Born: 7 October 1897 Htonbo, Pyay District, British Burma
- Died: 19 July 1947 (aged 49) Yangon, British Burma
- Resting place: Martyrs' Mausoleum, Myanmar
- Party: AFPFL
- Education: BSc, LLB
- Alma mater: University of Rangoon
- Profession: Lawyer

Thakin Mya (Burmese: သခင်မြ, pronounced [θəkʰɪ̀ɰ̃ mja̰]; 7 October 1897 – 19 July 1947) was a Burmese lawyer and politician.

He organized the Peasants and Workers Party in 1938, and was imprisoned by the British from 1940 to 1942. He was deputy prime minister in the pro-Japanese Independent Government from 1943 to 1945. In 1947 he was in the executive council of Anti-Fascist People's Freedom League.

He served as the Minister of Home Affairs and in June 1947 was transferred as Minister of Finance in Myanmar's pre-independence government. Mya and six other cabinet ministers (including Prime Minister Aung San) were assassinated on 19 July 1947 in Yangon. He was unofficially considered Deputy Prime Minister in Aung San 's Cabinet. 19 July is commemorated each year as the Martyrs' Day in Myanmar.

The Thakin Mya Park in Yangon is named after Thakin Mya.
