= Justice Party (Burma) =

Political party in Myanmar

The Justice Party (Burmese: တရားမျှတမှု ပါတီ) was a political party in Burma.

== History ==
The party was established on 3 November 1954 by former Supreme Court judge E Maung. He saw the party as the Burmese equivalent to the centre-right British Liberal Party.

It joined the National United Front, and E Maung was elected to the Chamber of Deputies in the 1956 elections. However, E Maung later became a supporter of Anti-Fascist People's Freedom League Prime Minister U Nu.
