= Ko Htwe =

19 July martyr of Burma

Yebaw Ko Htwe
- ကိုထွေး
- Born: Mg Htwe; 1929; Mandalay, British Burma
- Died: 19 July 1947 (aged 17–18); Rangoon, British Burma
- Occupation: Security detail officer
- Known for: U Razak's bodyguard and Martyr of Burma
- Parent(s): Ko Ko Lay (father); Min Yi (mother)

Htwe (Burmese: ထွေး, pronounced [tʰwé]; 1929 – 19 July 1947), known honorifically as Yebaw Ko Htwe, was a Burmese security detail officer who was killed in the assassination of Burmese pre-independence government leaders on 19 July 1947. He was a bodyguard of U Razak, the Minister for Ministry of Education and National Planning. Ko Htwe was the lone non-office holder who was killed. Seven cabinet ministers (including Prime Minister Aung San) and a deputy minister were killed in their meeting room at the Secretariat compound in downtown Yangon. 19 July is commemorated each year as the Martyrs' Day in Myanmar.

Htwe was only 18 at his death. He was born to Ko Ko Lay, an officer at the Department of Agriculture and his wife Min Yi in Mandalay.
