= Tin Tut =

Burmese politician (1895–1948)

Tin Tut CBE
- တင်ထွဋ်
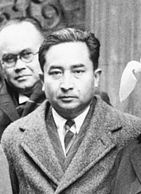
- Tin Tut in 1947

1st Minister of Foreign Affairs
- In office 4 January 1948 – 16 August 1948
- Prime Minister: U Nu
- Preceded by: Office established
- Succeeded by: Kyaw Nyein

Minister of Finance
- In office 28 September 1946 – 10 June 1947
- Prime Minister: Aung San
- Preceded by: Office established
- Succeeded by: Thakin Mya

Minister of Finance
- In office 19 July 1947 – 4 January 1948
- Prime Minister: Aung San
- Preceded by: Thakin Mya
- Succeeded by: U Tin

Chancellor of University of Rangoon
- In office 1939–1942

Personal details
- Born: 1 February 1895 Rangoon, British Burma
- Died: 18 September 1948 (aged 53) Rangoon, Burma
- Party: AFPFL
- Relations: Htin Aung, Myint Thein and Kyaw Myint
- Education: University of Cambridge

Tin Tut, CBE (Burmese: တင်ထွဋ်, pronounced [tɪ̀ɰ̃ tʰʊʔ]; also spelt Tin Htut; 1 February 1895 – 18 September 1948) was the 1st Minister of Foreign Affairs of the Union of Burma, and the Minister of Finance in Aung San's pre-independence government.

Educated at Dulwich and Queens' College, Cambridge, Tin Tut was the first Burmese to become an Indian Civil Service officer. He was Prime Minister Aung San's deputy in the government. However, he was not present in the cabinet meeting on 19 July 1947. On that day, assassination that claimed the lives of Aung San and six other cabinet ministers occurred.

He was mortally wounded when a bomb exploded in his car on Sparks Street on 18 September 1948. He died shortly after in Rangoon General Hospital.

A close adviser of Aung San, he was instrumental in negotiations for Burma's independence including Panglong and Nu-Attlee agreements. Historian Thant Myint-U called him "the brightest Burmese officer of his generation".
