= E Maung =

Burmese lawyer

U E Maung
- ဦးဧမောင်
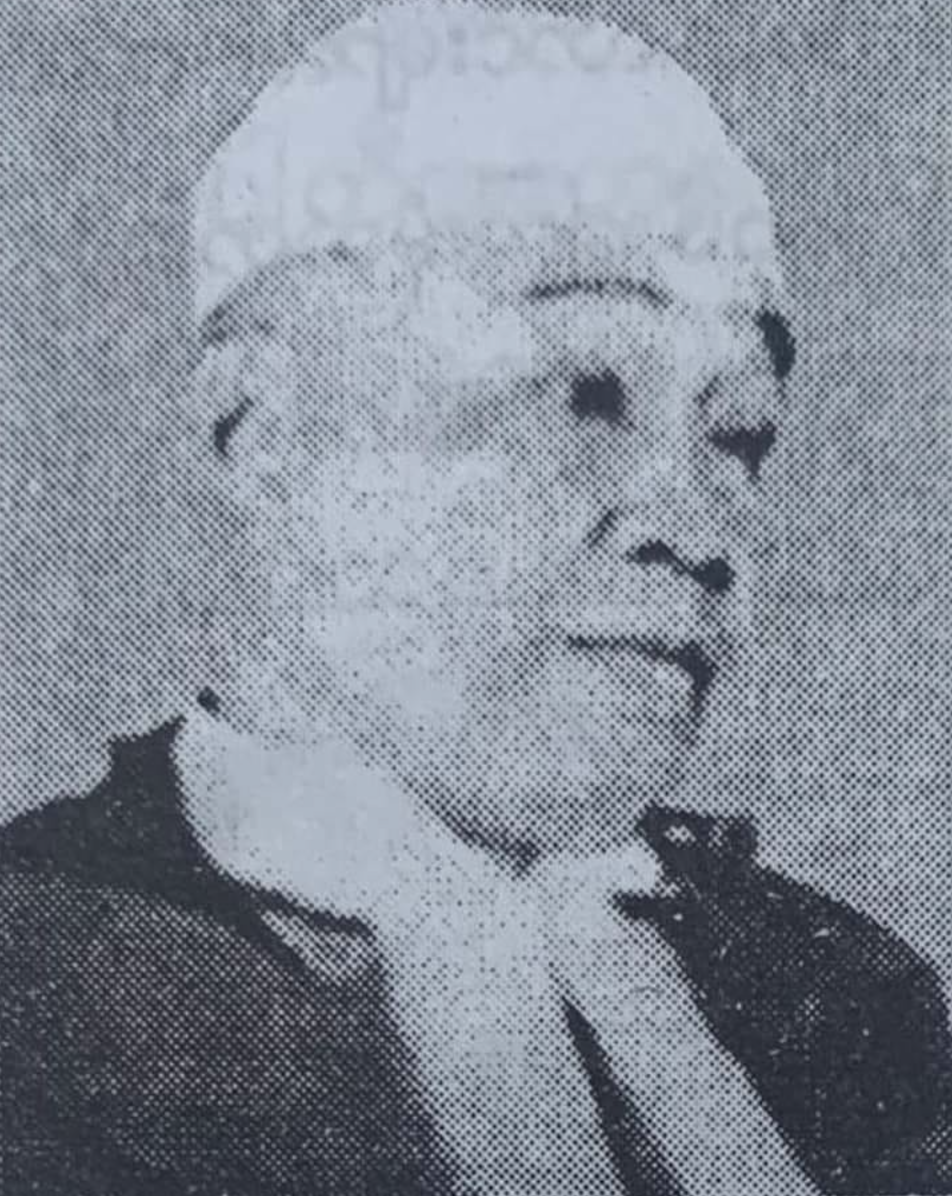
- E Maung in 1961

Personal details
- Born: January 1898 Monywa, Monywa Township, Lower Chindwin District, British India
- Died: 21 July 1977 (aged 79) Bahan Township, Yangon, Yangon Region, Myanmar
- Party: Justice Party (1954—1962) National United Front (1956—1962)
- Education: University of Rangoon

U E Maung (Burmese: ဦးဧမောင်; January 1889 - 21 July 1977) was a Burmese lawyer, writer, minister, and supreme court judge. He held multiple ministerial portfolios during U Nu's post-independence AFPFL government. This included the Ministry of Foreign Affairs, Ministry of Judicial Affairs, Ministry of Resettlement, Ministry of Health, and Ministry of Home Affairs. He was also a former judge of the Supreme Court of the Union of Burma from 1948 to 1952. He wrote several landmark works on Burmese law, such as the books Burmese Buddhist Law and The Expansion of Burmese Buddhist Law.

== Early life and education ==
E Maung was born in the town of Monywa in January 1898 in what was then the British Raj. He earned his Bachelor of Laws (L.L. B.) degree from the University of Rangoon in 1921. He was then called to the Bar by the Middle Temple in 1922. He was awarded an honorary Doctor of Law degree by the University of Rangoon in 1952.

== Career ==
He became a lawyer in Rangoon in 1922 after he was called to the Bar. He worked part-time lecturing at the University of Rangoon's Law Department from 1922 till 1932. In 1939, he was appointed a justice of the High Court of Burma.
