= U Razak =

Burmese politician

U Abdul Razak
- ဦးအဗ္ဗဒူရာဇတ် عبدالرزاق
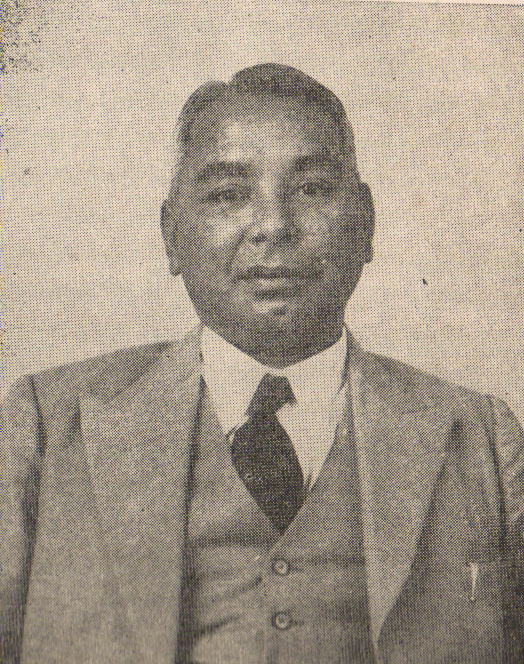

Minister of Education and National Planning
- In office September 1946 – 19 July 1947
- Prime Minister: Aung San
- Preceded by: Office not in use
- Succeeded by: Office not in use

Personal details
- Born: 20 January 1898 Meiktila, British Burma, British India
- Died: 19 July 1947 (aged 49) Rangoon, Burma
- Party: AFPFL
- Parent(s): Sheik Abdul Rahman (father); Nyein Hla (mother)
- Education: University of Rangoon

U Razak (Urdu: عبدالرزاق; Abdul Razaq; Burmese: ဦးရာဇတ်, pronounced [ʔú jàzaʔ]; also Abdul Razak; 20 January 1898 – 19 July 1947) was a Burmese politician and an educationalist. Of mixed Bamar-Indian ancestry, he was a cabinet minister in Aung San's pre-independence interim government, and was assassinated on 19 July 1947 along Sung San and six other cabinet ministers. July 19 is commemorated each year as Martyrs' Day in Myanmar. Razak was Minister of Education and National Planning, and was chairman of the Burma Muslim Congress.

Abdul Razak was born in Meiktila, Upper Burma, on 20 January 1898 to Nyein Hla, a Buddhist of Bamar descent, and Sheik Abdul Rahman, a wealthy Indian police inspector. While his brothers and sisters chose to be Buddhists, he maintained the Muslim name Razak, in honor of his father. Although nominally Muslim, Razak was a secularist who deeply loved Burma and encouraged unity in diversity. He studied at the Wesleyan School in Mandalay, and continued his studies at the Rangoon College, earning a B.A. degree in English. Throughout his school years, Razak was involved in athletics.

In 1920, Razak was the first Burmese organizer of a boycott of the British colonial education system. In 1921, he became headmaster of Mandalay National High School. Razak's natural charisma was effective in persuading the Mandalayans. Mandalay, where he taught, was a center of Burmese Buddhist faith and culture. Yet Razak was fully accepted by the community. When Japan invaded Burma in World War II, he was imprisoned.

In 1945, Abdul Razak was named chairman of the Mandalay branch of Anti-Fascist People's Freedom League (AFPFL) and was elected a Member of Parliament to represent Mandalay. He was Minister of Education and National Planning in Aung San's cabinet. He died on 19 July 1947 together with six other cabinet members.

Razak initiated calls for unity between Burmese Muslims and Buddhists. He was a Muslim, but maintained ties to Buddhism, educating himself on Pali, the sacred script of Theravada Buddhism, and helped found the Mandalay College (modern Mandalay University). Razak fathered three children.
