= Möng Pawn State =

Former Shan state in Burma

Coordinates: 20°42′N 97°26′E

Möng Pawn မိုင်းပွန်နယ်
- State of the Shan States
- 1816–1959
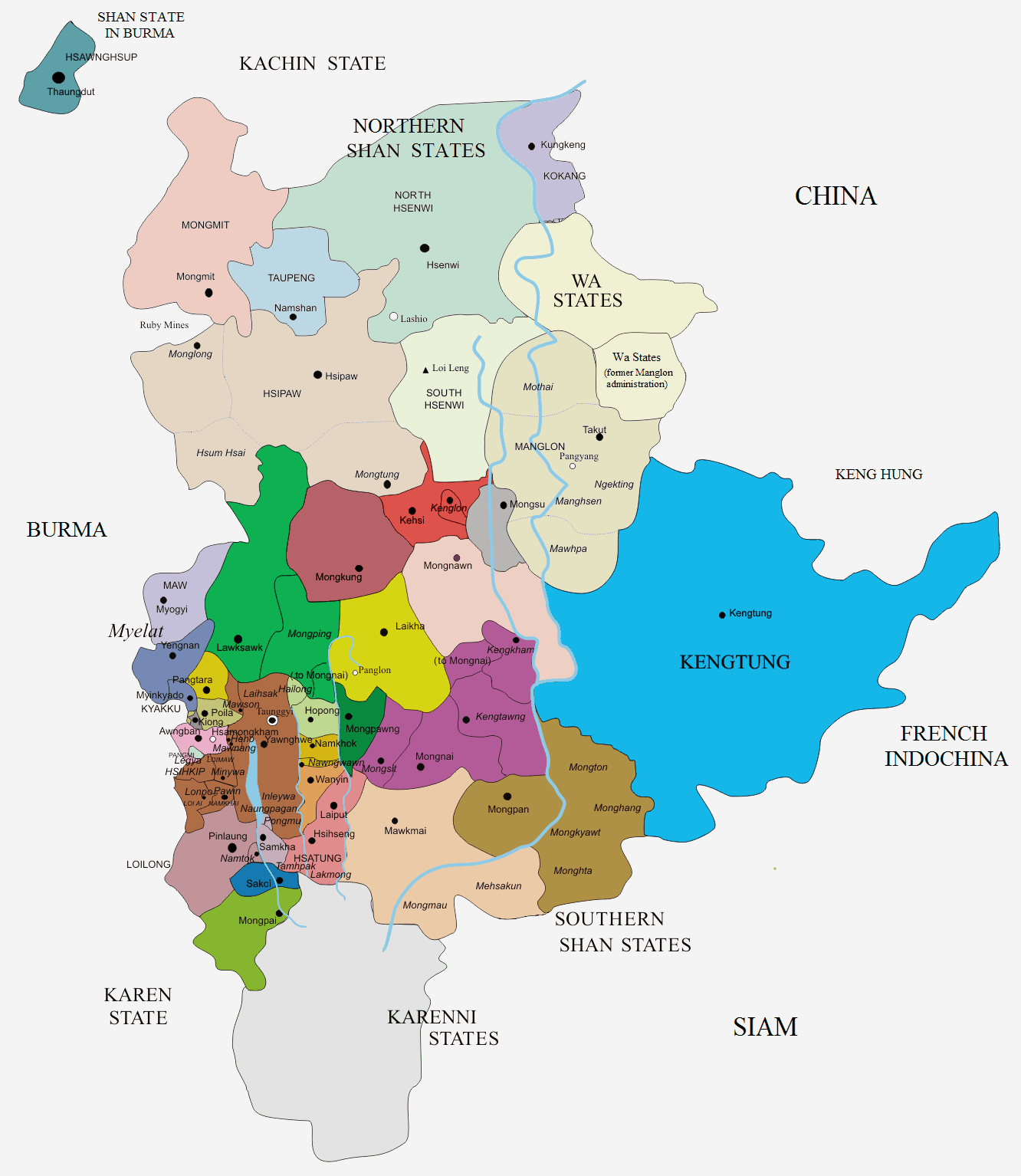
- Möng Pawn in a map of the Shan States
- Area
  - 1901: 960 km^{2} (370 sq mi)
- Population
  - 1901: 13,143
- History
  - Foundation of the kingdom of Rajjavadi: 1816
  - Abdication of the last Saopha: 1959
Preceded by	Succeeded by
Ava Kingdom	Shan State

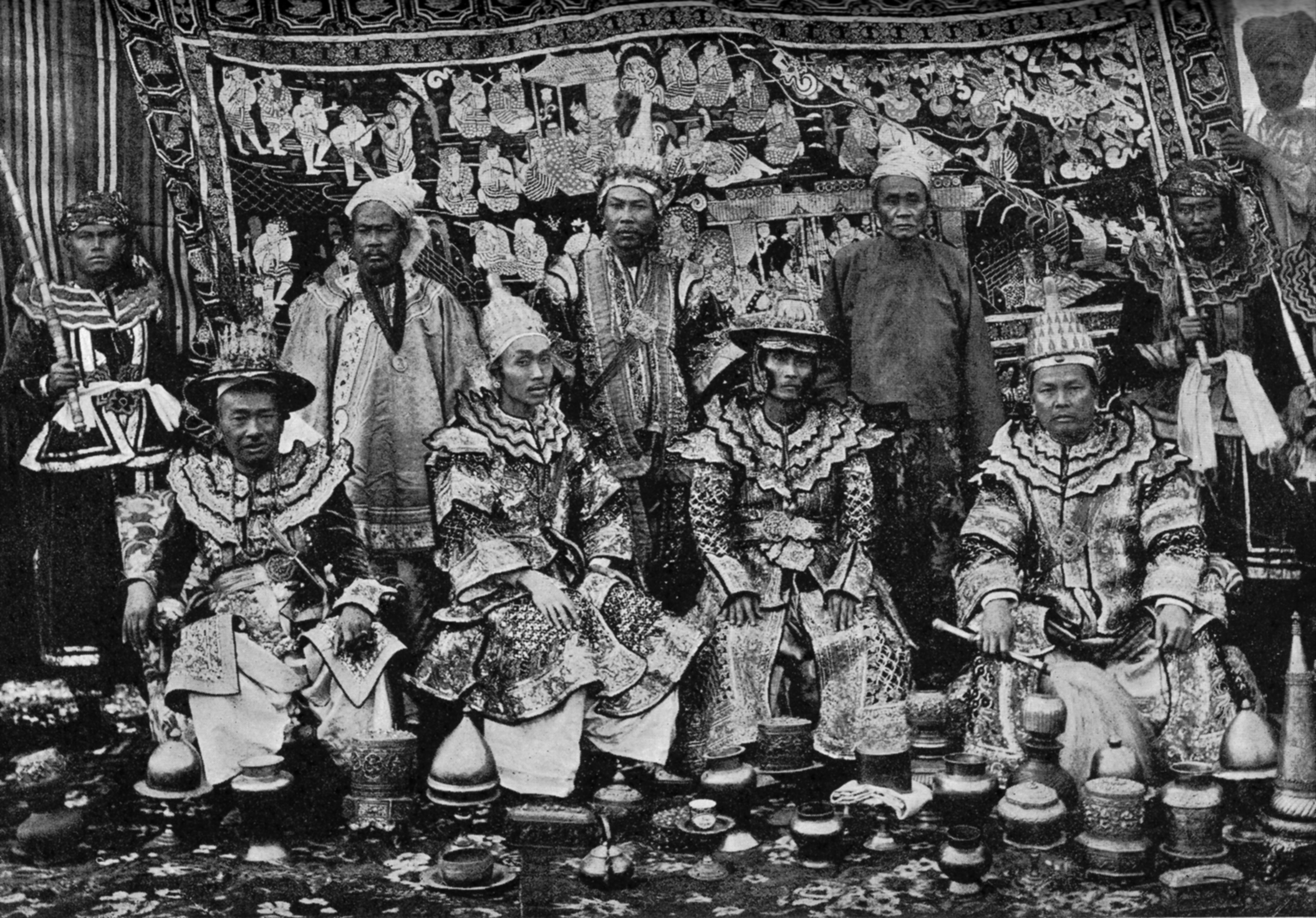
The ruler of Mongpawn, first in the front row from the left, at the Delhi Durbar in 1903

Möng Pawn, also known as Maingpun (Burmese: မိုင်းပွန်), was a Shan state in what is today Burma. The state was part of the Eastern Division of the Southern Shan States and was located south of Laihka State in the valley of the Nam Pawn river.

== History ==
According to tradition a predecessor state in the area was named Rajjavadi. Möng Pawn was founded in 1816 under the overlordship of Möng Nai. Historically Möng Pawn played an important part before the British annexation of Upper Burma, at the time of the Burmese resistance movement 1885–95. The ruler of Möng Pawn was an active supporter of the Limbin Prince, Kanaung Mintha, also known as Prince Limbin, was a son of King Tharrawaddy Min.

Traditionally about two thirds of the population in the state belonged to the Shan and about one third to the Pa'O people groups, the former living in the valley and the latter on the hilly areas.

=== Rulers ===
The rulers of Möng Pawn bore the title of Myoza and from 1887, Saopha.

==== Myozas ====
- 1816–1860: Sao Hkun Lek (d. 1860)
- 1860–1882: Sao Hkun Hti (1847–1928)

==== Saophas ====
- 1882–1928: Sao Hkun Hti (s.a.)
- 1928 – 19 Jul 1947: Sao Sam Htun (b. 1907–d. 1947)
- 20 July 1947 – 1958: Sao Hsè Hom (b. 1936)
