= Ministers' Building =

Ministers' Office
- ဝန်ကြီးများရုံး (Burmese)
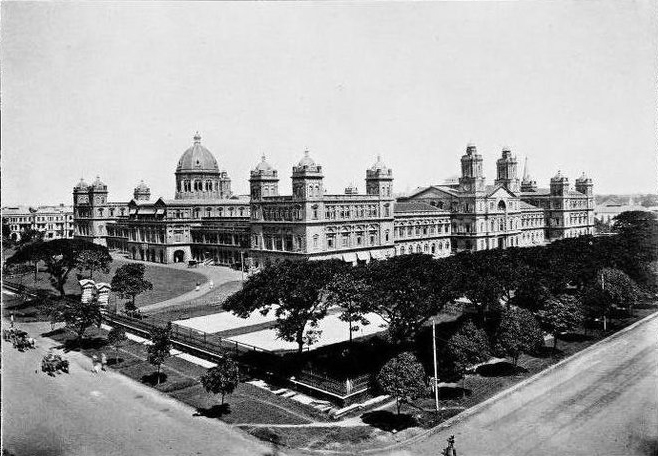
- The Secretariat building in the early 1900s. Over the course of the building's later life the complex's grand cupola and 8 of 16 ornate towers on its left and right wings were destroyed during the Bago Earthquake.

- Location within Myanmar
- 16°46′32″N 96°9′57″E
- Location: Botataung, Yangon, Yangon Region, Myanmar

History
- Built: 1905

Yangon City Landmark
- Designated: 1996

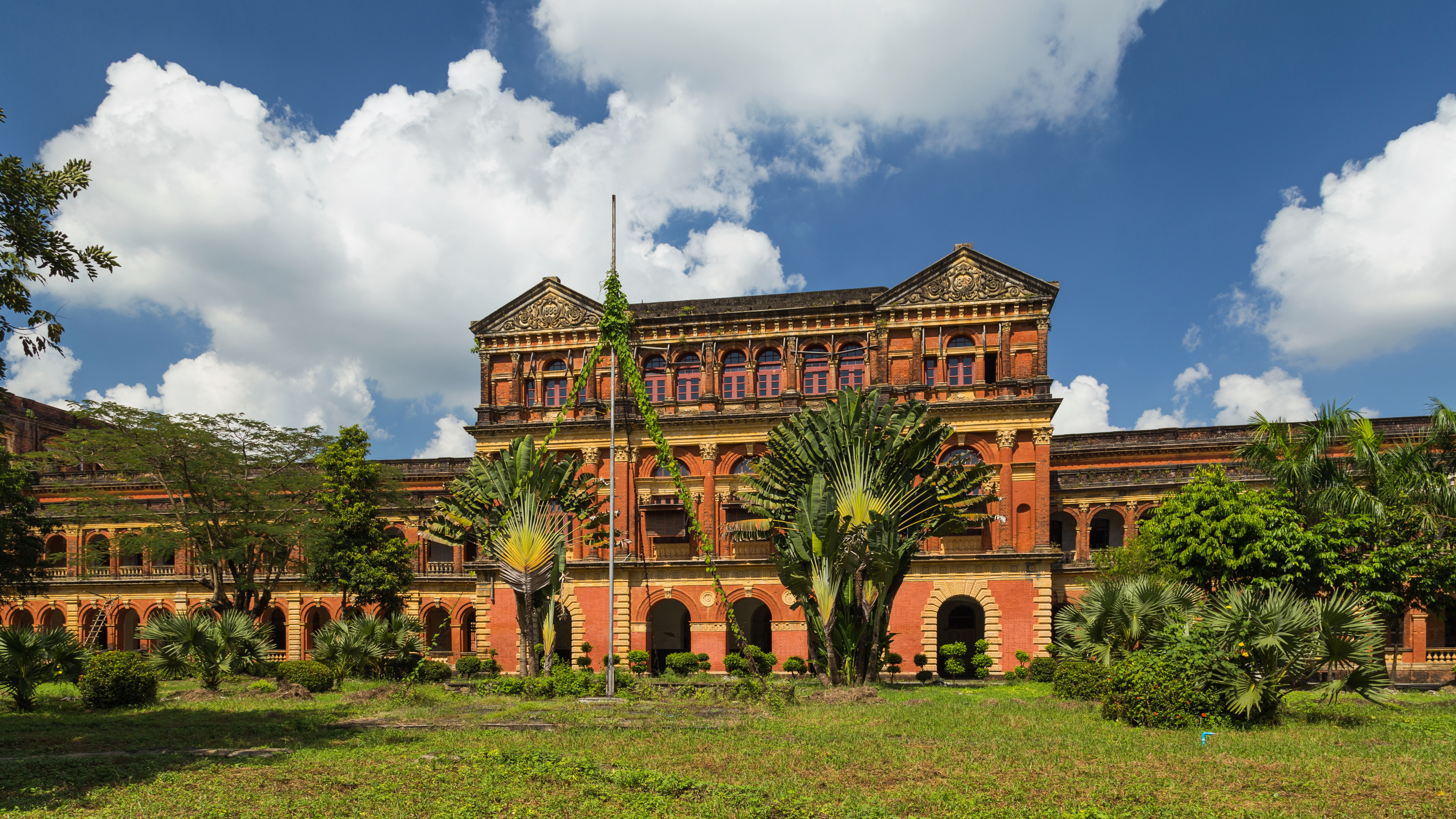
Building in 2016

The Ministers' Building; officially the Ministers' Office (Burmese: ဝန်ကြီးများရုံး), also known as The Secretariat (Burmese: အတွင်းဝန်ရုံး) or Secretariat Yangon, was the administrative seat of British Burma, in downtown Yangon, Burma and is the spot where Aung San and eight cabinet ministers were assassinated. The British administration moved the office from Strand Road after administrative work increased greatly resulting in an urgent need to expand the cramped and poorly lit administration building.

== Location ==
The building is situated on 6.5 hectares (16 acres). It takes up an entire city block with Anawrahta Road to the north, Theinbyu Road to the east, Maha Bandoola Road to the south and Bo Aung Kyaw Street to the west. It is about 1 kilometre (0.62 mi) South East of Yangon Central Railway Station and 600 metres (2,000 ft) east of the Sule Pagoda.

== Construction ==
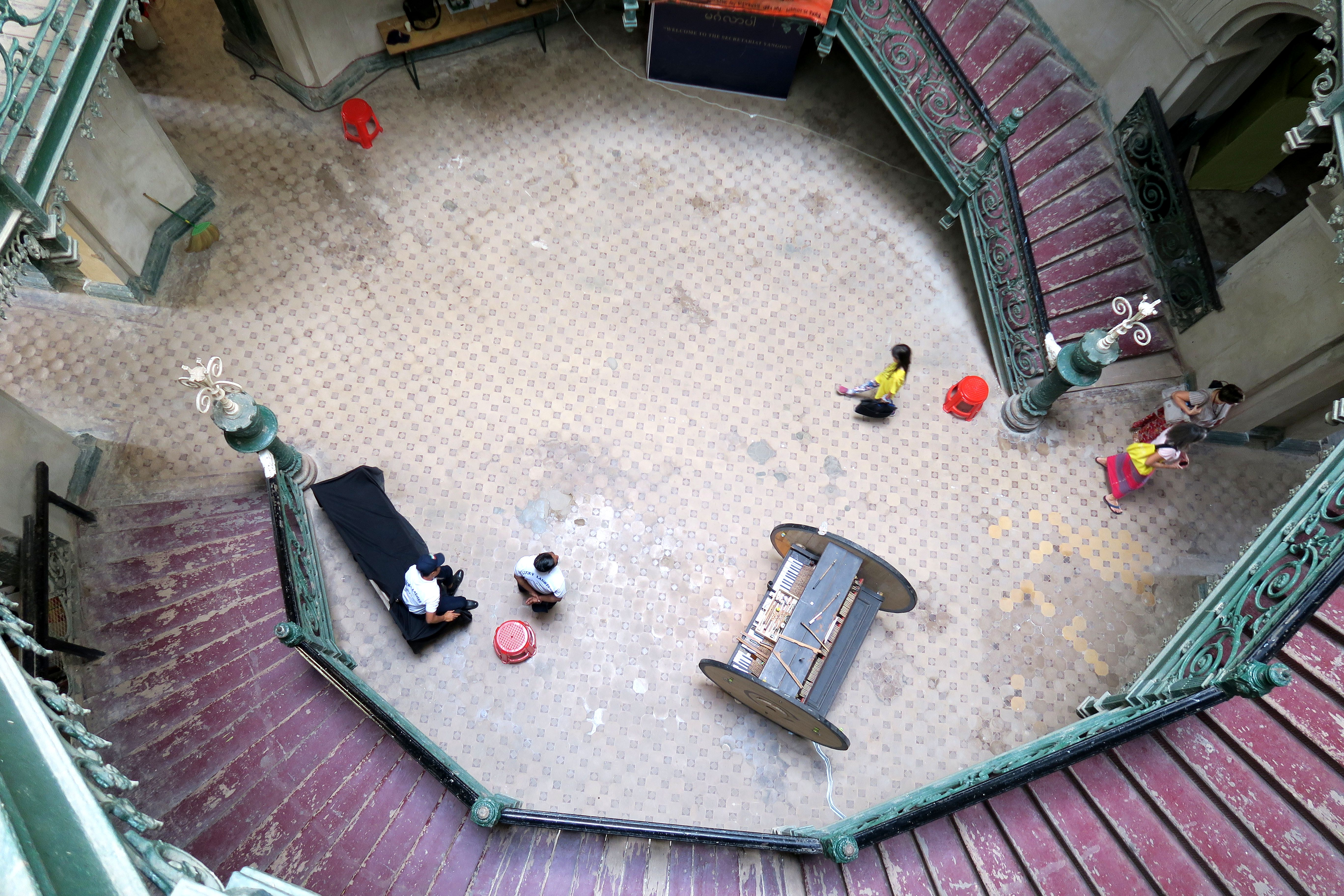
Double spiral staircase of the Ministers' Building.

The Victorian-style building is made from red and yellow brick and constructed in a U-shape. Construction began in late 1889. The central building was completed in 1902, while the complex's eastern and western wings were finished in 1905, at the cost of Rs.2.5 million. Until 1972, the complex was called the Government Secretariat. The British assigned Henry Hoyne-Fox, executive engineer at government's public works the task of designing a sprawling new Victorian-style complex on 16 acres in Yangon.

== Structure ==
The building is a U-shape with the parliament building engulfed around. Due to the city's soft landscape, the Northern Wing of the building sank a few meters underground. The Eastern and Western Wings were constructed and finished in 1905 to support it. The building originally consisted of 16 cupolas but only eight of them have survived. They are designed similar to the structure of the Crown of Queen Victoria.

The steel used in the support structure of the buildings was shipped in from Glasgow, Scotland and the original roof tiles were manufactured in France while the bricks and teak for the woodwork were locally sourced across Asia.

== Parliament Building ==
The Parliament building was built in 1919. It is the very place where the independence of the country was handed over by the British on 4 January 1948. In-front of the building is the flagpole where the Union Jack was lowered and the flag of Independent Burma was raised. Just a few meters away from it is a brick monument memorizing the 7 fallen ministers of the 1947 assassination.(Ko Htwe and U Ohn Maung weren't ministers).

== The assassination of Bogyoke Aung San ==
This building is where General Aung San, the father of modern Myanmar, spent his working days. On 19 July 1947, during a meeting of the Executive Council at the Ministers Building, Aung San and eight cabinet ministers were assassinated by a gang of armed paramilitaries. They had been sent by the former Prime Minister U Saw. This day is now commemorated as Burmese Martyrs' Day. The building is currently on the Yangon City Heritage List and restoration work is underway, parts of the complex are open to the public and there is an informative guided tour for a fee.

== Restoration ==
Two of the four towers on the corner buildings as well as the central dome collapsed during an earthquake in the 1930s. The building has been vacant since the government was moved to the new capital Naypyidaw. The government debated whether to restore it and turn it into a hotel or museum. In 2011, amid national discussions on converting Yangon's colonial-era buildings to attract tourism, plans were made to convert the Ministers' Building into a museum, not a hotel.

In February 2012, seven local companies and three foreign companies submitted a proposal to the Myanmar Investment Commission (MIC) to convert the Ministers' Building into a Martyrs' Museum, culture aspect and theme park. Anawmar Art Group will operate the museum under the guidance of historians, curators and the Yangon Heritage Trust. The room where the assassination had taken place had been used as a Buddhist shrine until 2016.

== Availability to public ==
=== Daily Guided Heritage Tours ===
The Secretariat now offers Daily Guided Heritage Tours to visitors for a peek behind closed doors and construction scaffolding. These allow for exploring the history of the colonial building and learning the details of the renovation efforts.

=== Martyrs' Day ===
Each year on the anniversary of his death, General Aung San's former office and the room where he and his cabinet were gunned down are open to the public. On July 19, 2017, the country celebrated the 70th anniversary of Martyrs' Day. For the first time since the building closed, the Yangon Parliament House, located within the Secretariat compound and the Cabinet Meeting Room, was opened to the public. The building saw 42,101 Myanmar citizens and 205 foreigners come to honor their fallen heroes. The national museum brought in original furniture and artifacts from the time of assassination that had been in the room. Articles included were labeled chairs that seated the fallen martyrs, fountain pens, pencils, keys, wristwatches, blankets, lighters, cigarette boxes, money and signed notes that they used daily. Ko Htwe, a bodyguard who was also assassinated, was also remembered with a marker of where his body fell after being shot.

=== Visit by U.S. President Obama ===
In November, 2014, the United States President Barack Obama visited the building to honor the fallen. While on his tour of the building, Obama offered assistance with urban development and heritage protection. The president was accompanied Dr. Thant Myint-U, the Chairman of the Yangon Heritage Trust.

=== Wolfgang Laib Exhibit ===
Parts of the southeast wing of the building opened to the public on January 14 to February 4, 2017, for the art exhibit Where the Land and Water End by the German artist Wolfgang Laib. For the exhibit, Laib created one of his pollen installations at the base of the double spiral staircase but due to the conditions of the space it was only left up for the first two days of the exhibit. Also on display was one of his famous "milkstones" and a fleet of brass ships surrounded by rice.

== Gallery ==
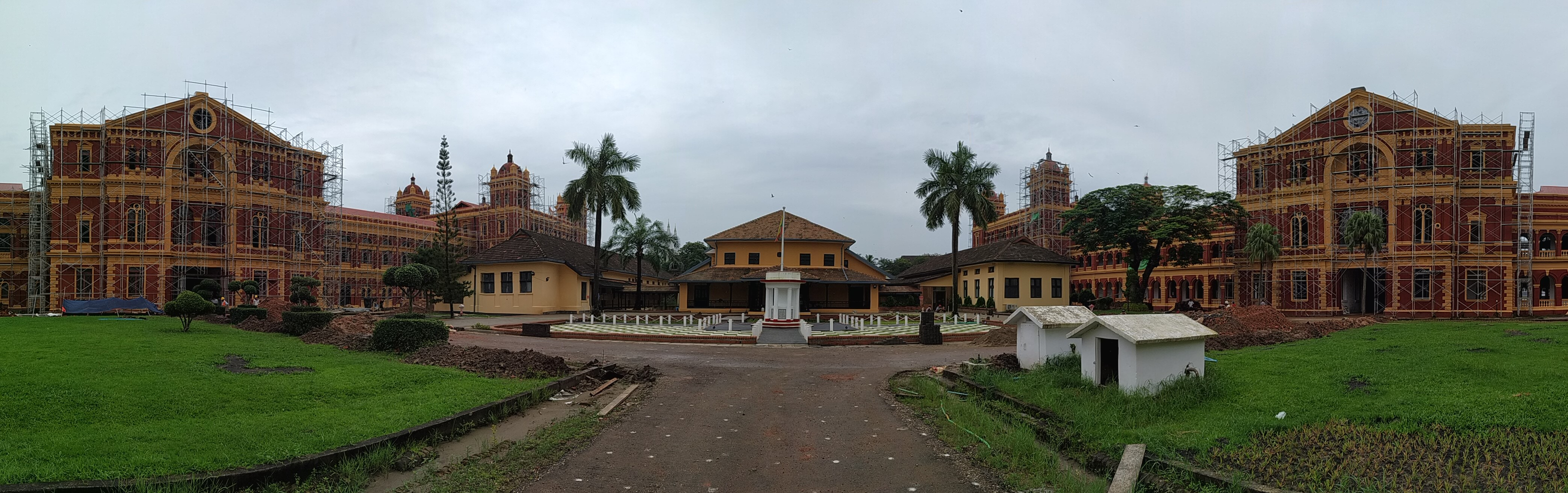

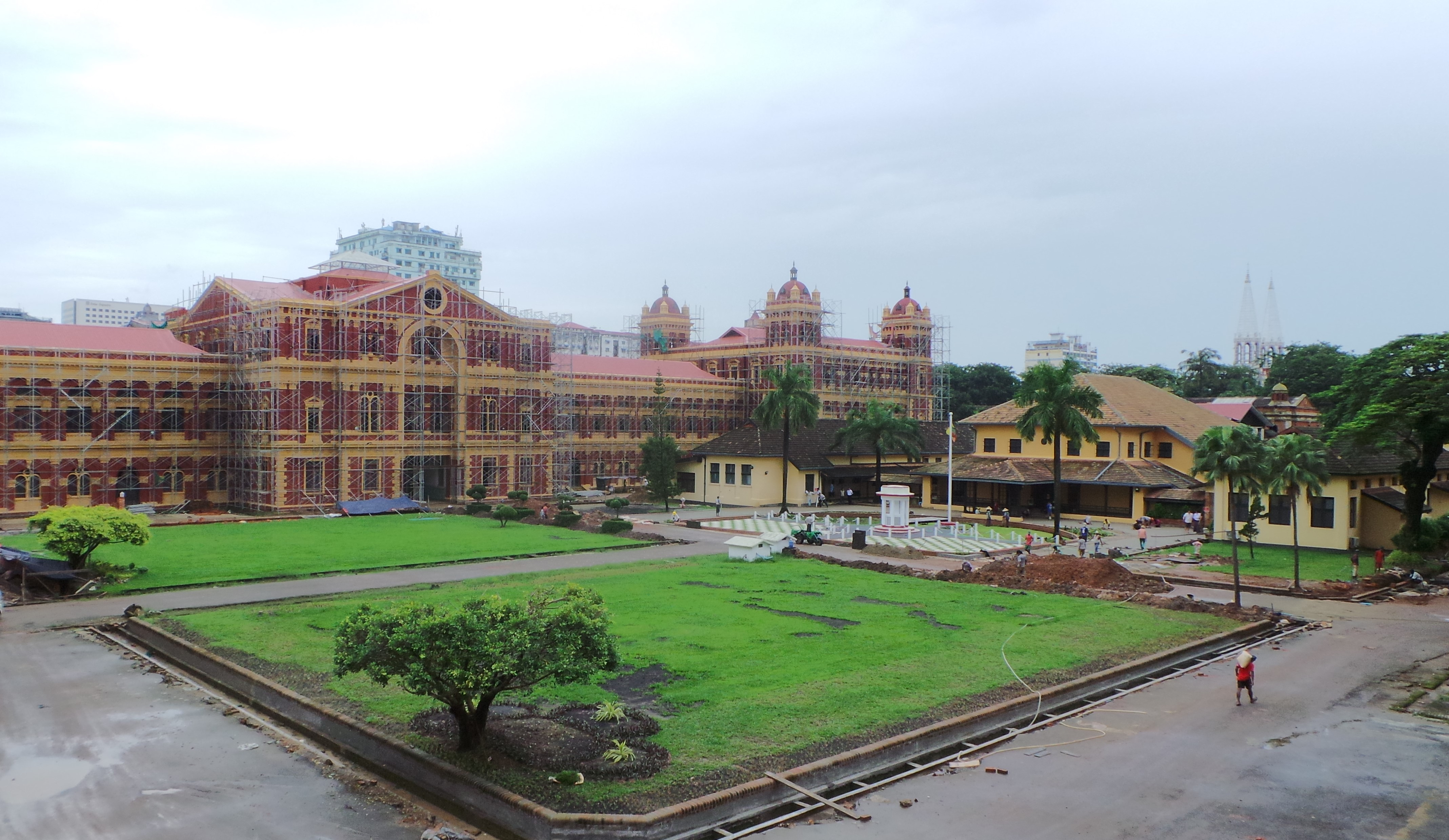

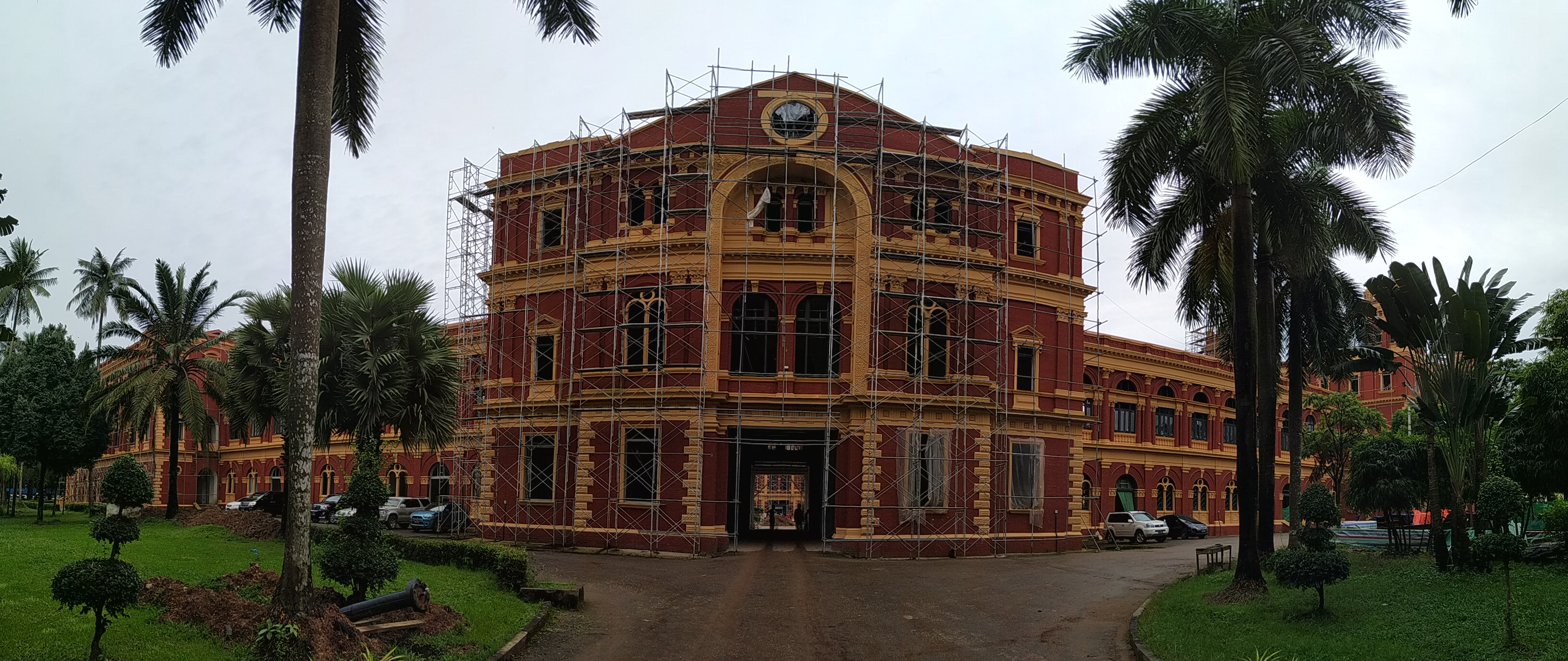

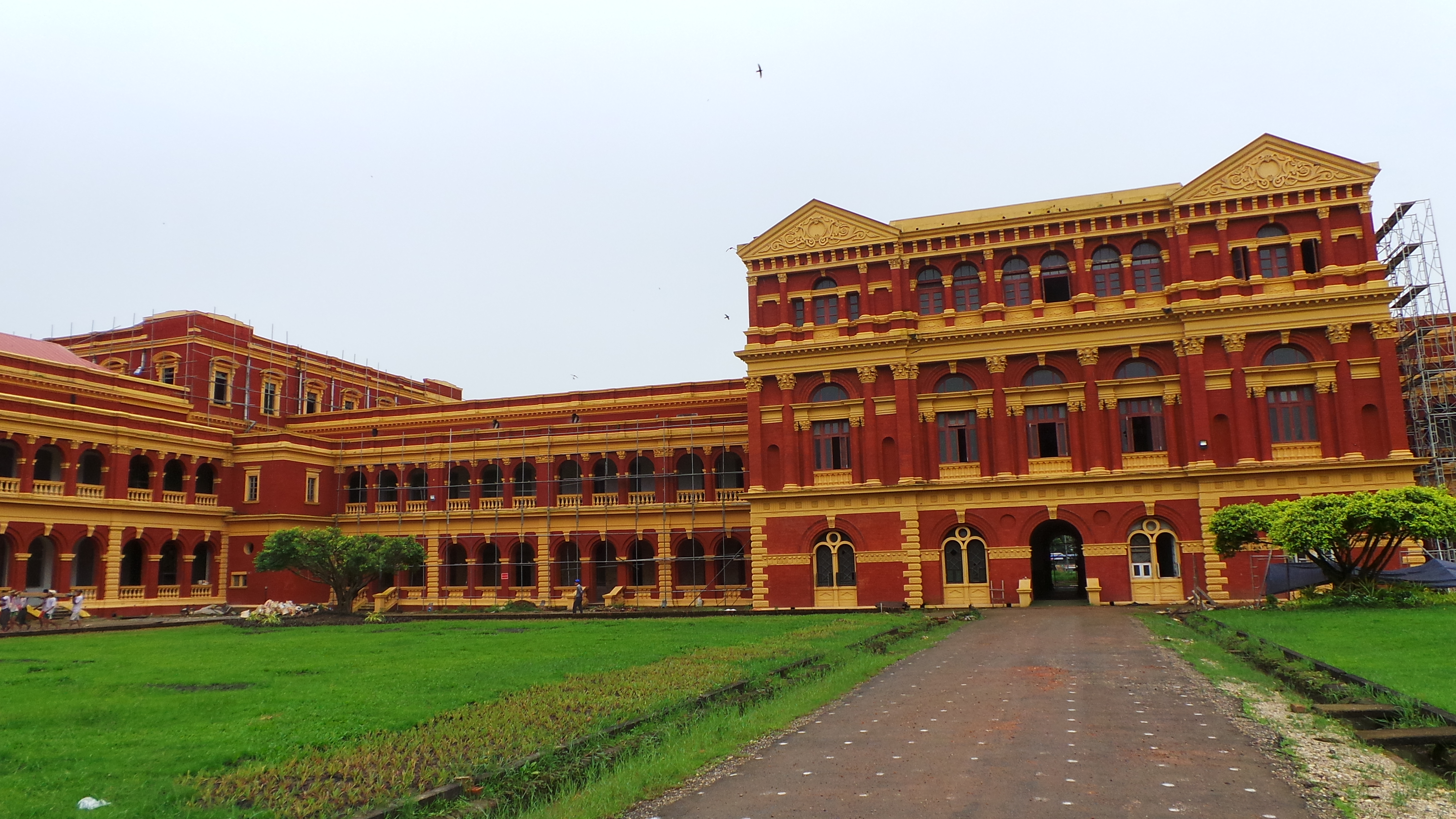

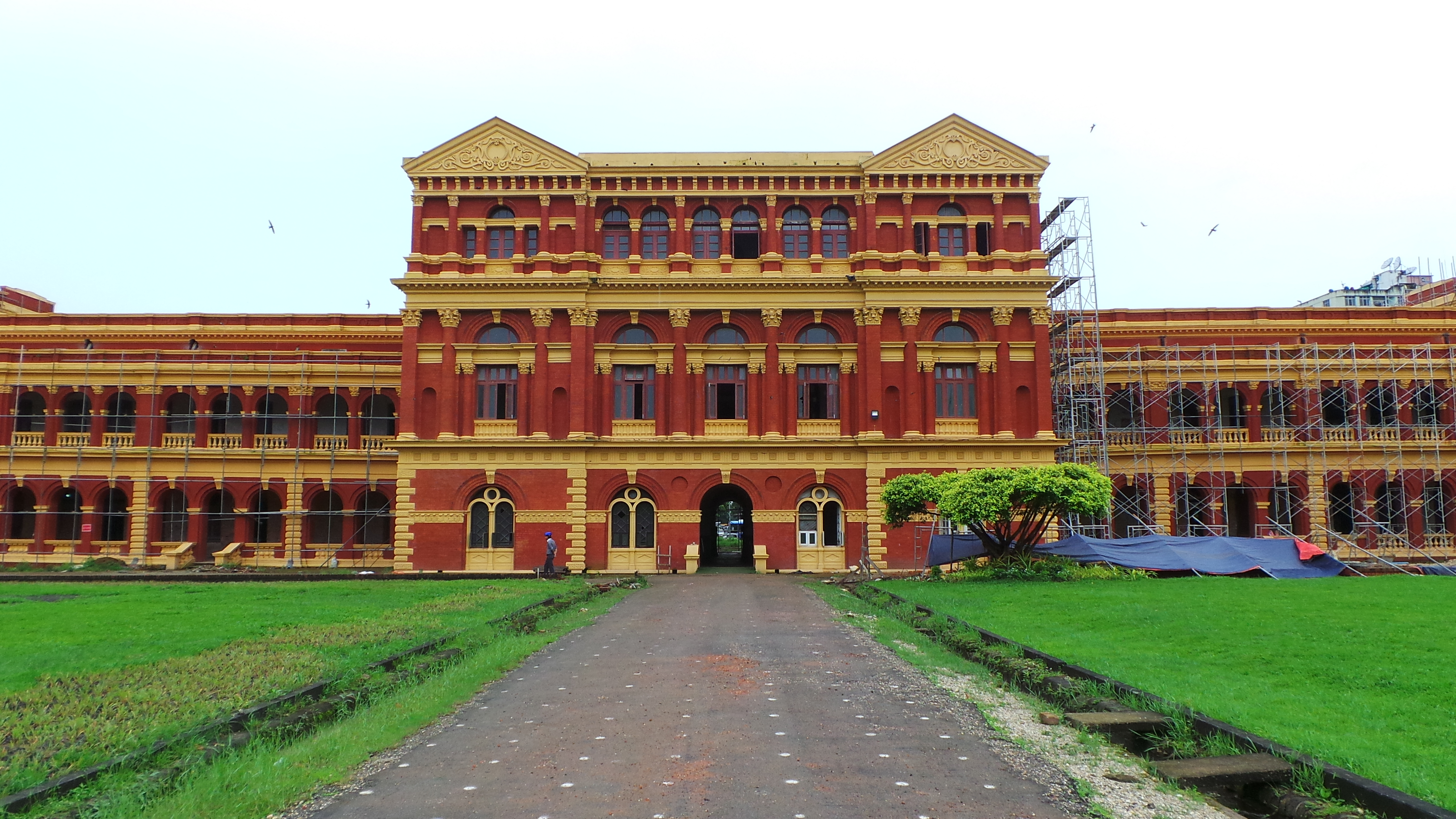

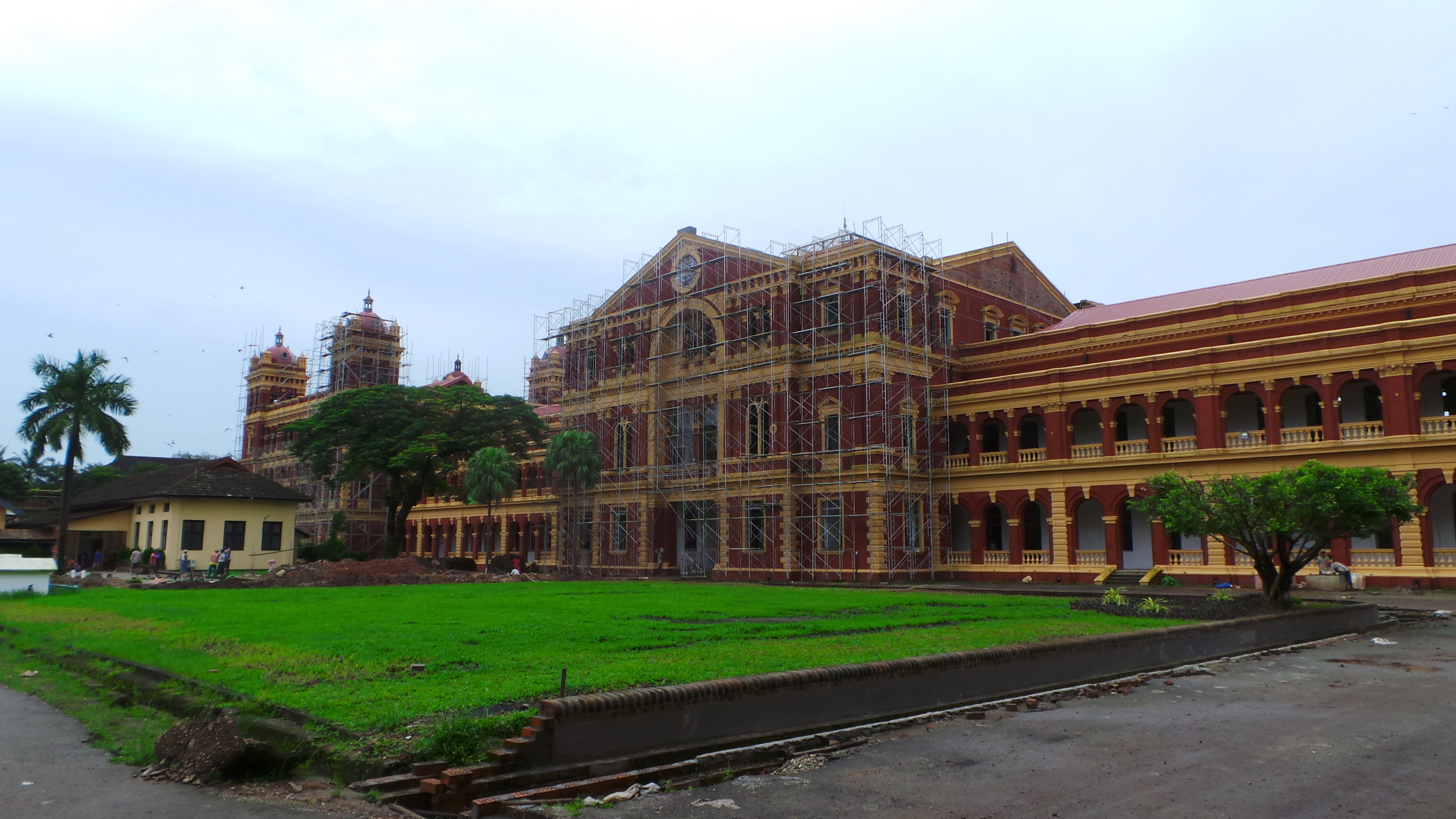
