= Sinheungsa Buddhist Paintings =

Repatriated paintings of Sinheungsa Temple, South Korea

Yeongsanhoesangdo
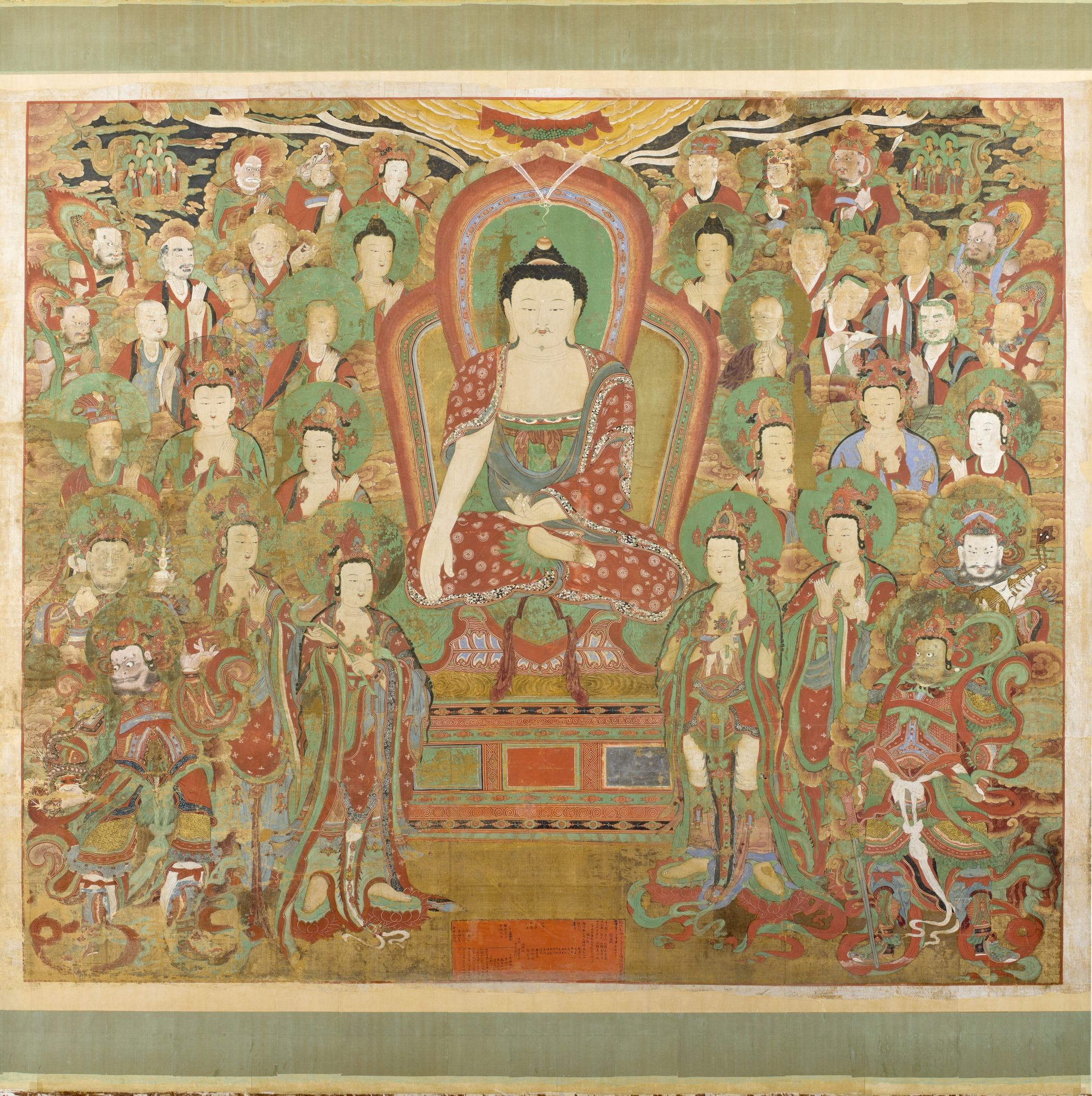
- Completion date: 1755
- Medium: Silk hanging scroll
- Movement: Buddhist art
- Dimensions: 335.28 cm × 406.4 cm (132 in × 160 in)
- Location: Sokcho, Gangwon Province, South Korea
- Owner: Sinheungsa
- Accession: LACMA AC 1998.268.1

The Sinhuengsa Buddhist Paintings are a set of 18th-century Buddhist paintings from the Joseon Dynasty. They are owned by the Sinheungsa Temple of the Jogye Order in Sokcho, Gangwon Province, South Korea. Composing of two sets of works: the Yeongsanhoesangdo (Preaching Shakyamuni) and the Siwangdo (The Ten Kings of Hell), they were looted from the temple by American military personnel in 1954 after the Korean War. The paintings ended up in the Los Angeles County Museum of Art and the Metropolitan Museum of Art in the 1990s–2000s, before subsequent research between the Jogye Order and museums led to their repatriations in 2020 and 2025.

== Paintings ==
=== Yeongsanhoesangdo ===
Measuring 335.28 by 406.4 centimetres (132.00 in × 160.00 in), the Yeongsanhoesangdo was painted in 1755 (31st year of Yeongjo). The Buddha is seen preaching the sutra at Vulture Peak, surrounded by bodhissatvas, Indra, Brahmā, and the Four Heavenly Kings as depicted in the Lotus Sutra. The painting along with the Siwangdo was taken approximately between May 1954 to October 1954 based on the photos of US Army Photographer Paul Buford Fancher and Officer Richard Bruce Rockwell from the US Marines, which showed the presence and subsequent absence of the paintings from the temple altar of the Sinheungsa's Daeungjeon (Main Buddha Hall). The temple's proximity to the Korean Demilitarized Zone is an attributed reason to why there was a heavy American military presence in the vicinity of the temple.

In 1998, the paintings emerged within the estate of Mary S. French who sold it to the Los Angeles County Museum of Art. They were found rolled up in the attic of her son's house in Hopkinton, New Hampshire, with its whereabouts after its disappearance unknown. When purchased, the Yeongsanhoesangdo was fragmented in six pieces, with extensive loss of polychromy and could not be displayed.

In 2010-–2011, CJ ENM and Miky Lee funded the conservation and the restoration of the Yeongsanhoesangdo with the lead of conservator Park Chi-sun., utilizing traditional tools. The painting was then unveiled to the public on 11 December 2011, accompanied by a Yeongsanjae ceremony.

It is considered the earliest hanging scroll painting in Gangwon Province.

=== Siwangdo ===
Six of the Ten Kings of Hell paintings were also purchased from the New Hampshire estate. They were commissioned in 1798 (22nd year of Jeongjo) and were held by Sinheungsa's Myeongbujeon (Hall of Jijang). Like the Yeongsanhoesangdo it was stolen prior to October 1954. They were conserved with a grant from South Korea's National Research Institute of Cultural Heritage from 2007-2009, and saw subsequent special exhibition at the Philadelphia Museum of Art (2014) and National Museum of Anthropology, Mexico City (2018) prior to its official repatriation in August 2020 to Sinheungsa alongside the Yeongsanhoesangdo.

==== Tenth King of Hell ====
The Tenth King of Hell
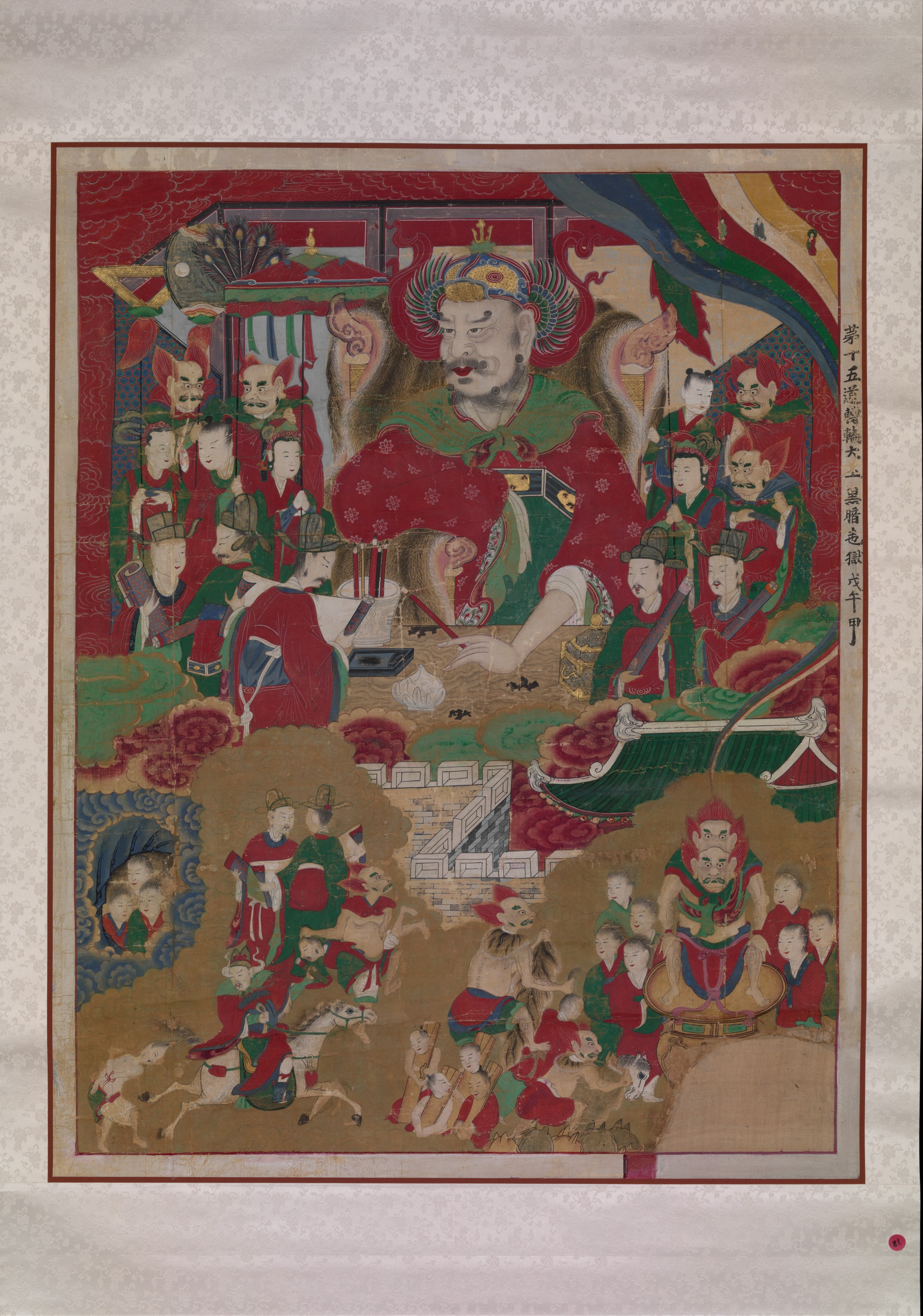
- Year: 1798
- Dimensions: 116.8 cm × 91.4 cm (46 in × 21 in)
- Location: Sokcho, Gangwon Province, South Korea
- Owner: Sinheungsa
- Accession: Metropolitan Museum of Art 2007.253
- Website: https://www.metmuseum.org/art/collection/search/73817

One of the Siwangdo, the Tenth King of Hell was held by the Metropolitan Museum of Art, with its first identified publication in 1993. Owned by Robert W. Moore in Los Angeles since the 1980s, the painting was a joint purchase with funds from the Parnassus Foundation, and the Mary & James G. Wallach Foundation.

The Tenth King wears warrior garb, surrounded by attendants, messengers, judges and wardens. The top right has rainbow representing the six paths of reincarnation, and a double-headed evil spirit is depicted in the lower right. The deceased who are receiving punishment for worldly sins populate the lower half of the painting.

The side margin of the scroll is written in Hanja:

第十五道轉輪大王黑暗地獄戊午甲 (Hangul: 제십오도전륜대왕흑암지옥무오갑) "The Tenth Great King of the Five Ways and the Right Law, in the darkest hell, painted in the cyclical year muo (1798)"

The painting saw rotation to public display in the 2008 Arts of Korea exhibit and the 2012 Korean Art exhibit.

Discussions of the repatriation of the Tenth King was initiated in 2023 between the MET and the Overseas Korean Heritage Foundation, with the submission of request placed in October 2024. The repatriation was made official on 14 November 2025.

As of 2025, three of the Ten Kings paintings remain missing.

== Repatriation ==
The University of Geneva noted that Sinheungsa's case for repatriation is unique for its straightforward resolution and presents a change towards the repatriation of the United States' approach to Asian art, as in the past, there was often a hierarchy with Japan as the highest priority. As a result of the patriation of the LACMA paintings, the Jogye Order announced the increased collaboration with the LACMA for future cultural exchange and loans. The MET's repatriation comes in line with a series of additional repatriations of its collection over the summer and autumn, including high profile pieces such as the Vessel Stand with Ibex (2500 BC) from Iraq, as well as 14 antiquities from Italy.

== Gallery ==
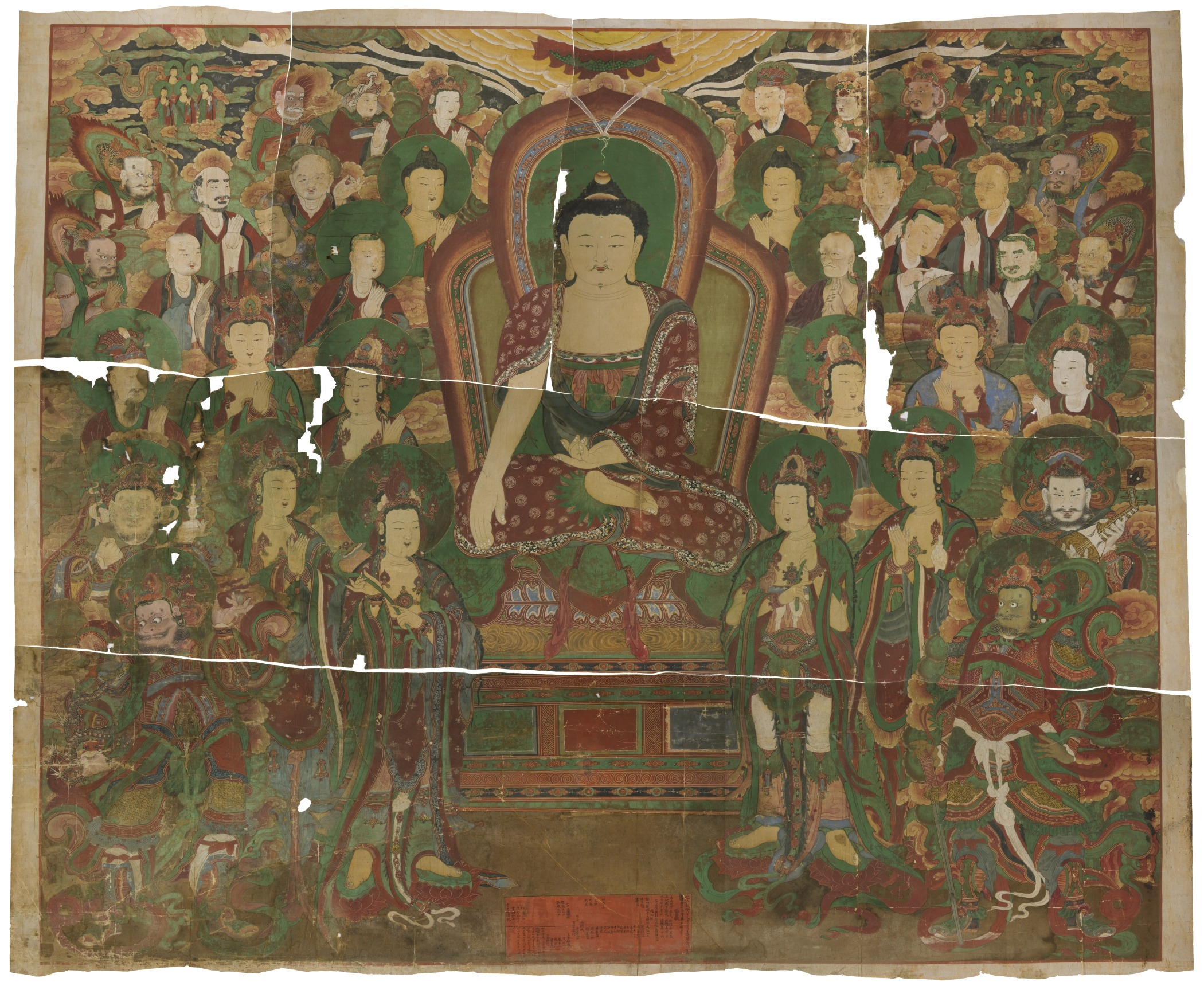
Yeongsanhoesangdo (1755), before conservation and restoration

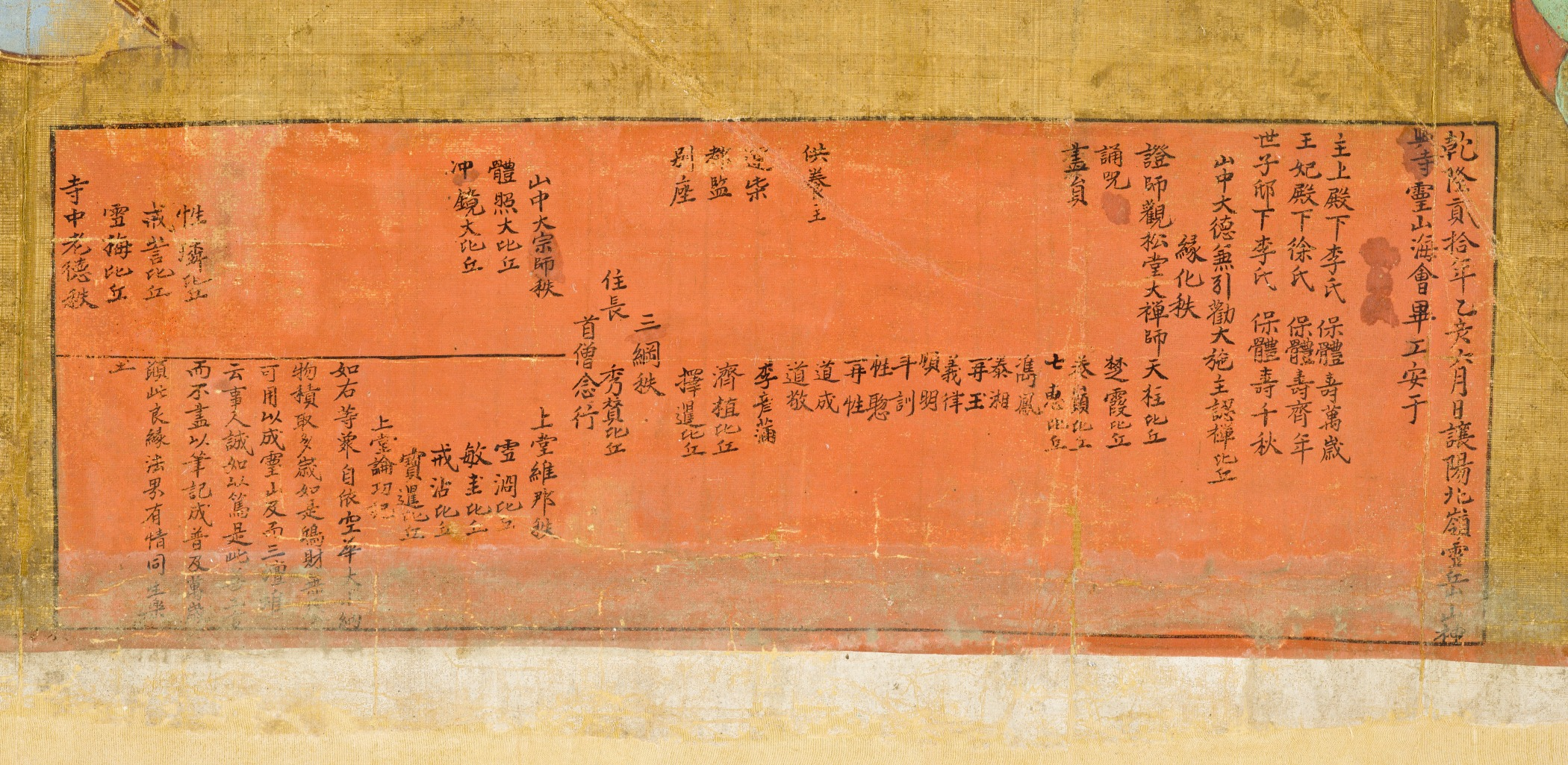
Yeongsanhoesangdo (1755), Text

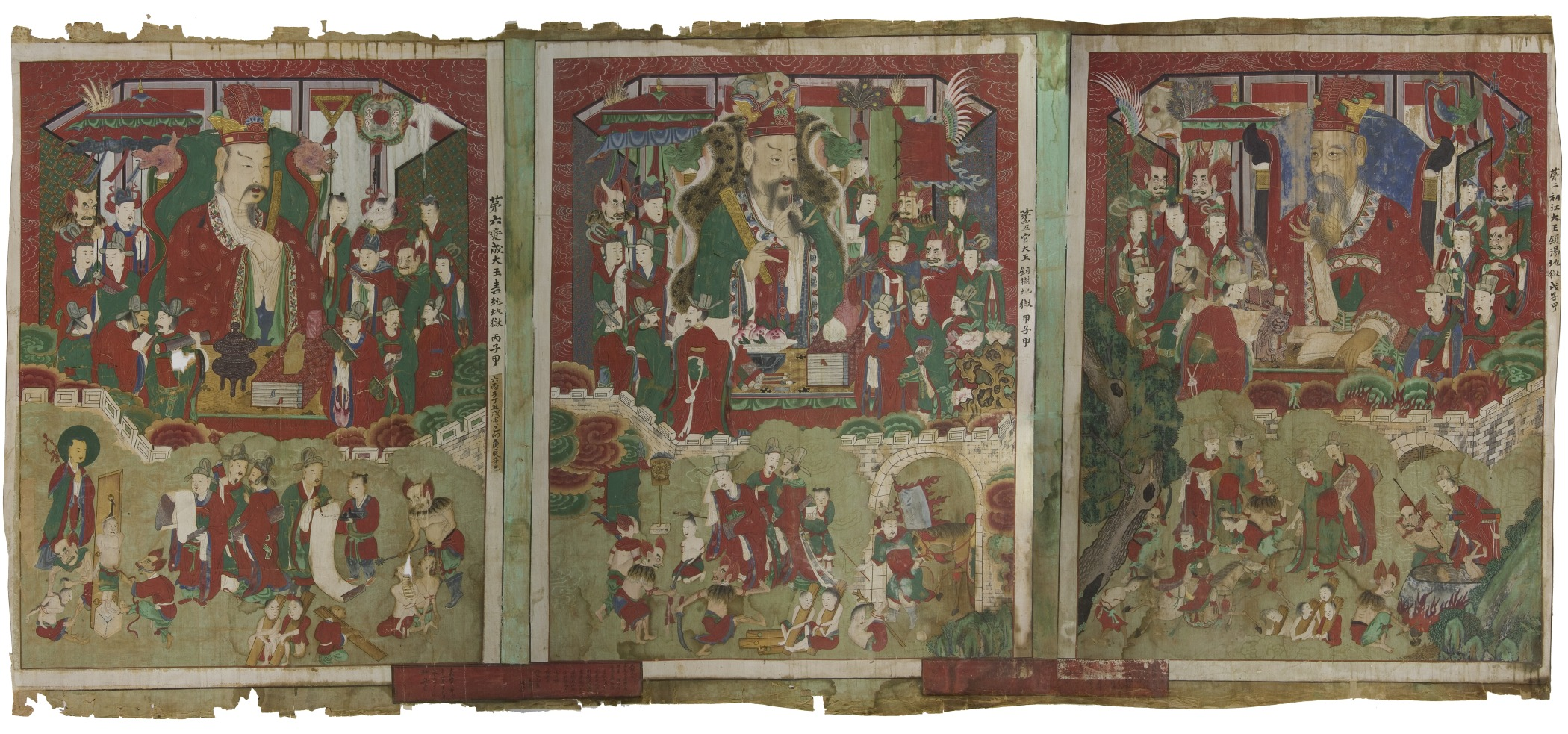
Six of the Ten Kings of Hell (1798) AC 1998.268.3.1-.6 - before conservation

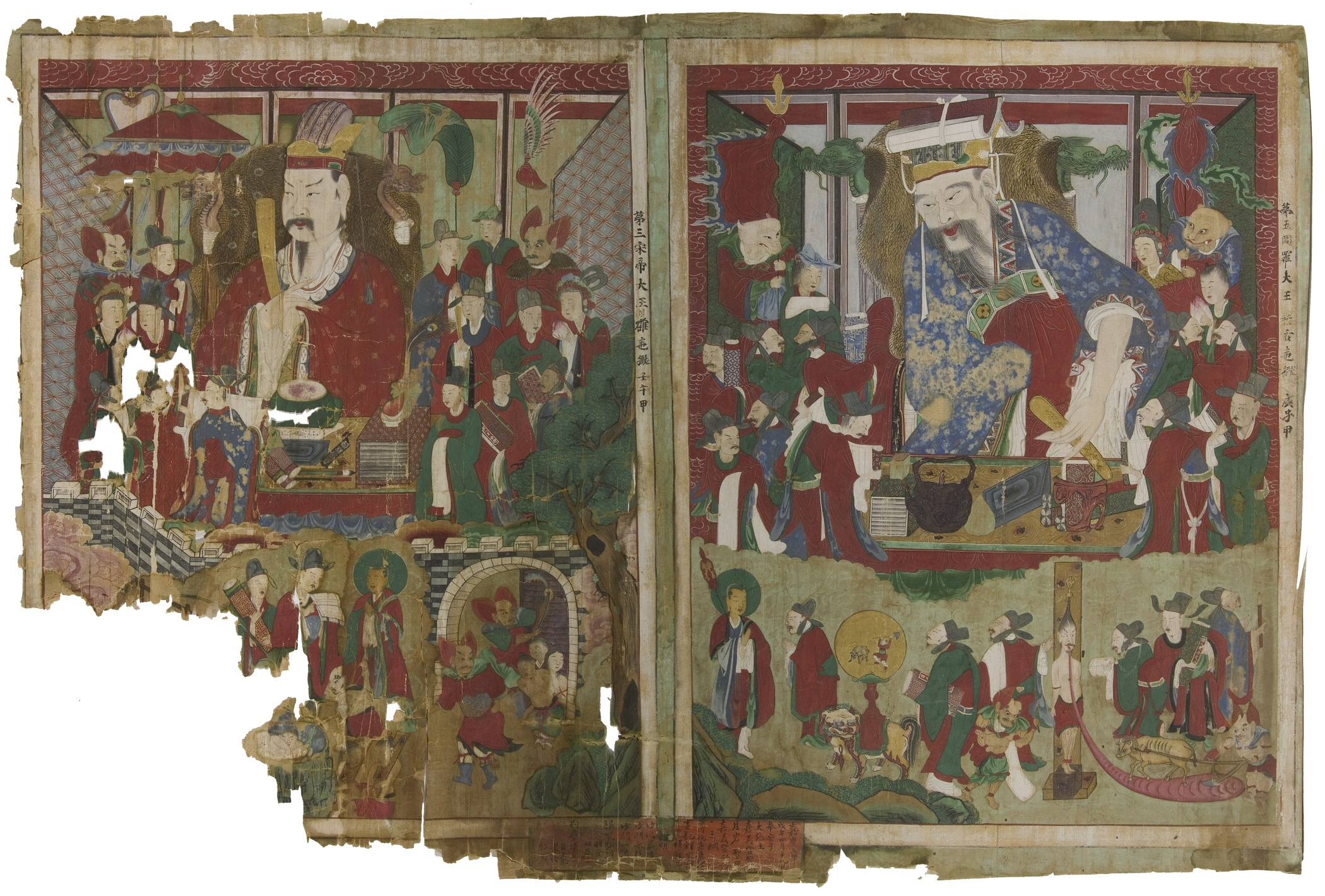
Six of the Ten Kings of Hell (1798) AC 1998.268.3.1-.6 - before conservation

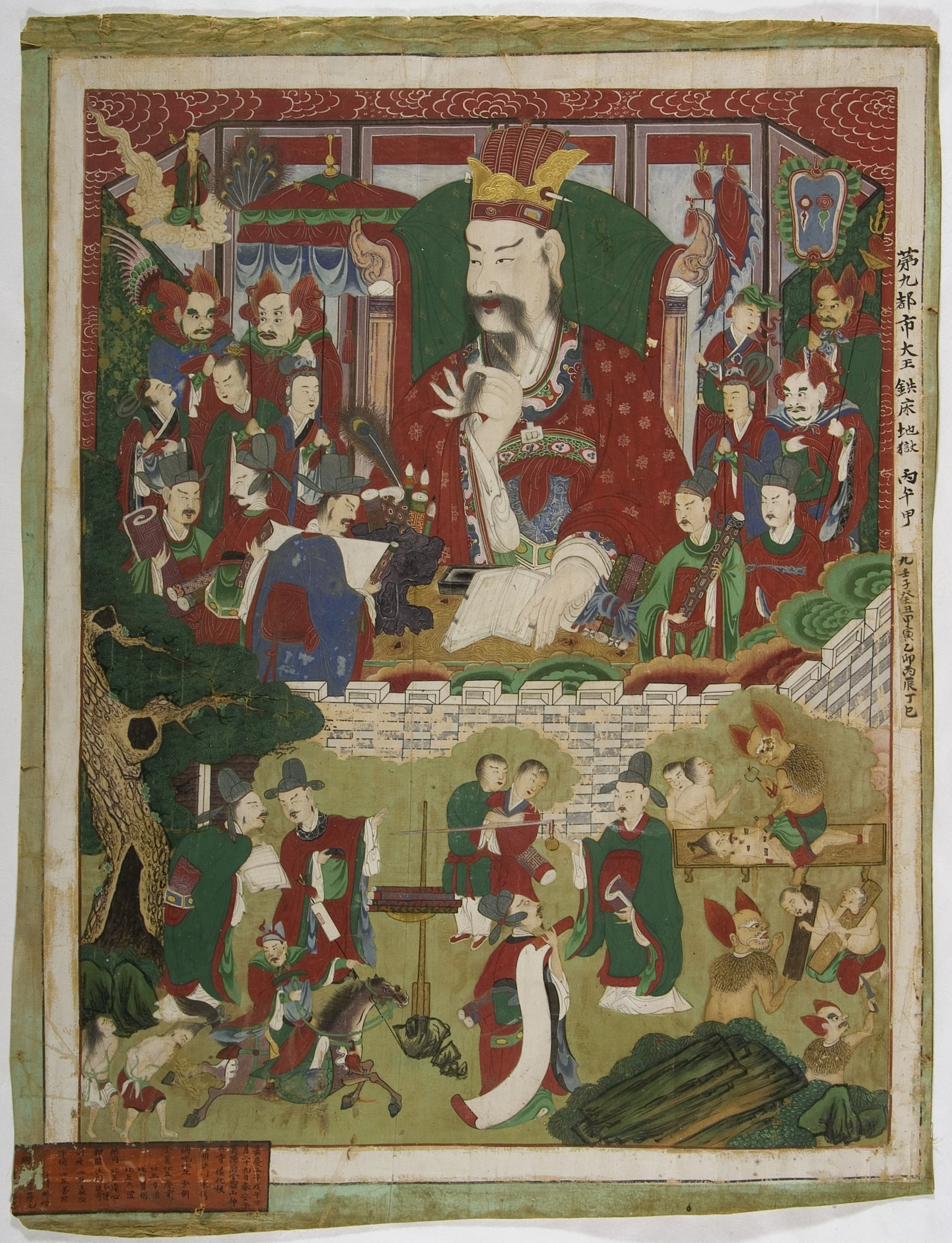
Six of the Ten Kings of Hell (1798) AC 1998.268.3.1-.6 - before conservation

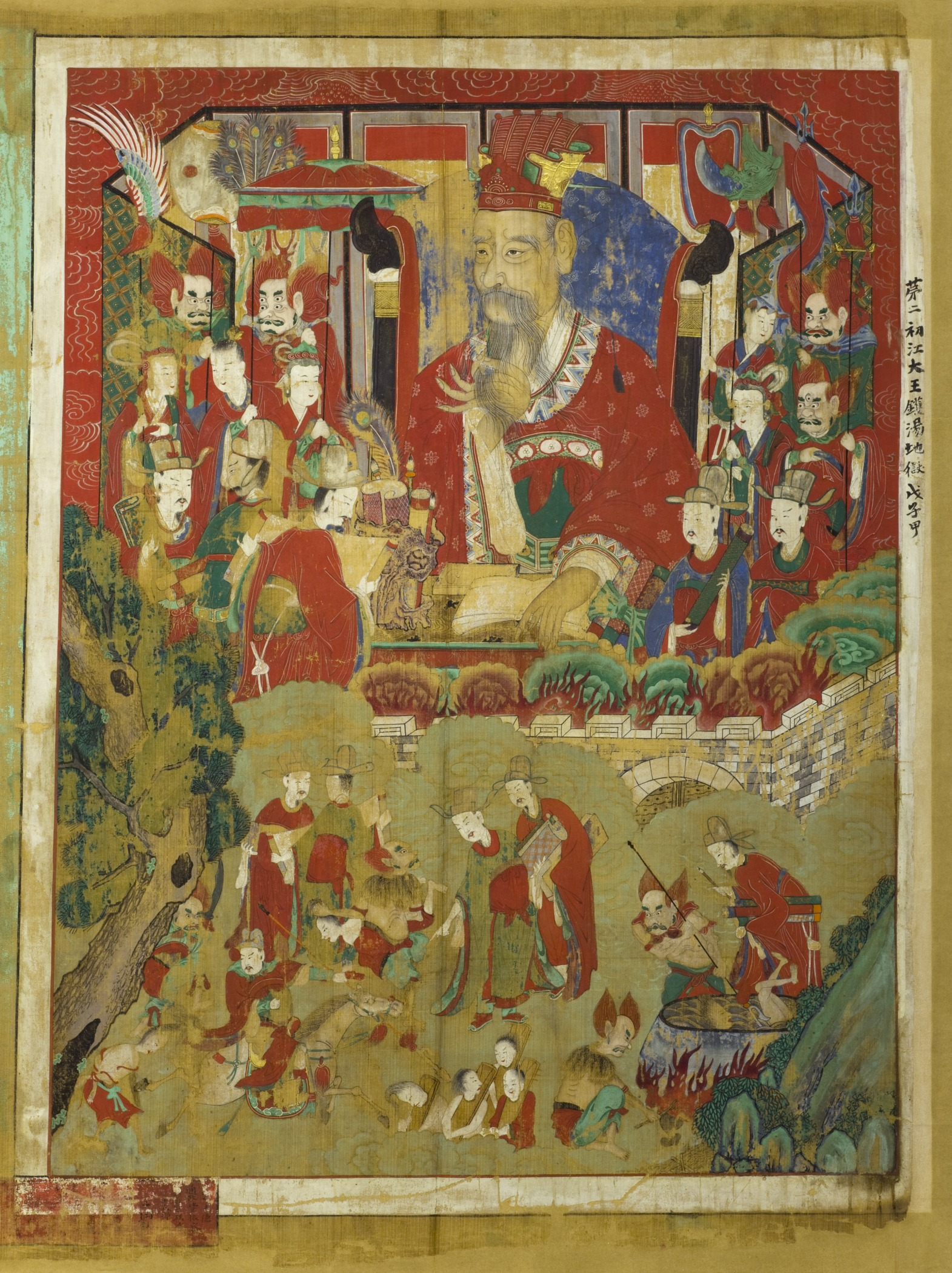
Six of the Ten Kings of Hell (1798) AC 1998.268.3.1-.6

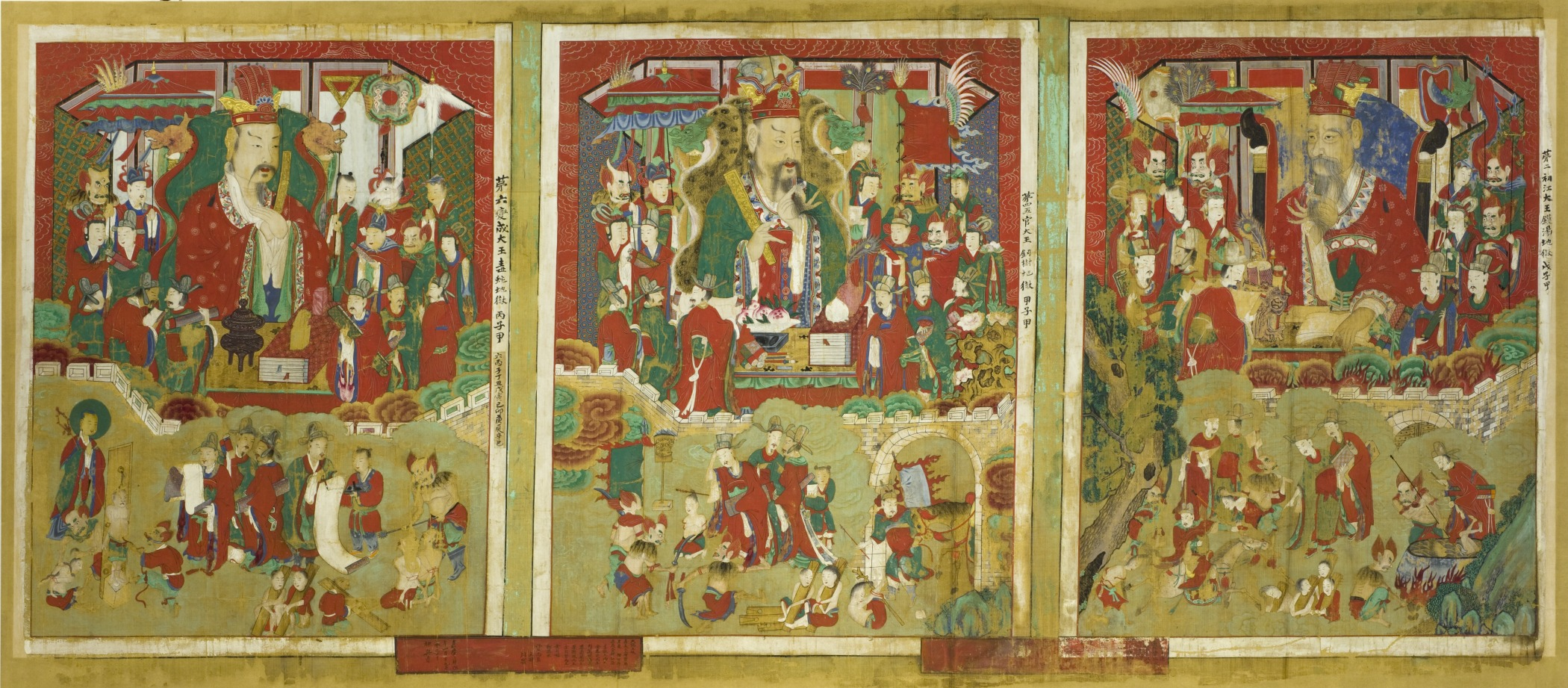
Six of the Ten Kings of Hell (1798) AC 1998.268.3.1-.6

== See also ==
- Gwaebul
