= Thongdrel =

Giant thangka depicting buddha or boddhisatva

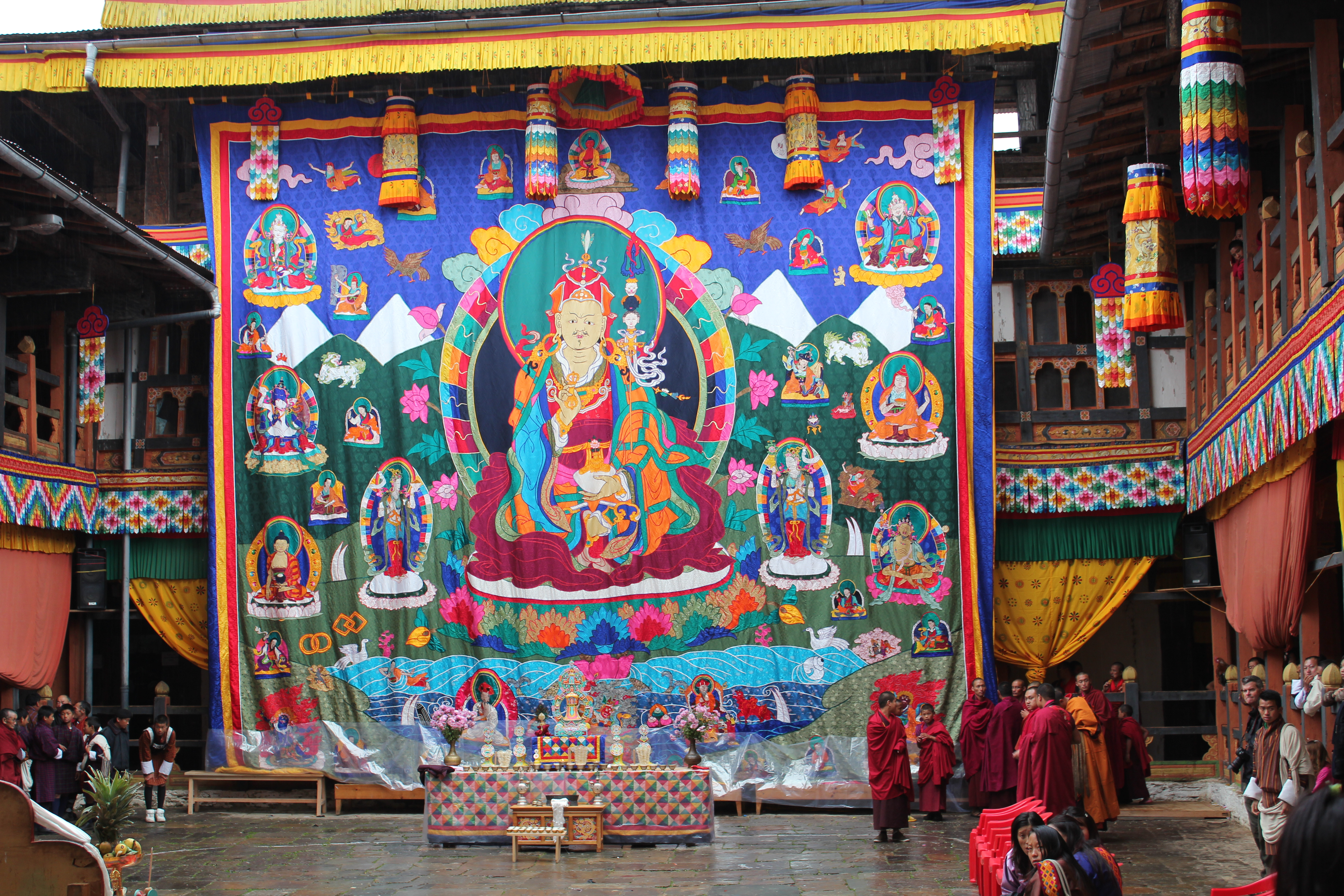
Large thongdrel or appliqué festival thangka hung in the courtyard at Jakar Dzong in Bhutan, 2013

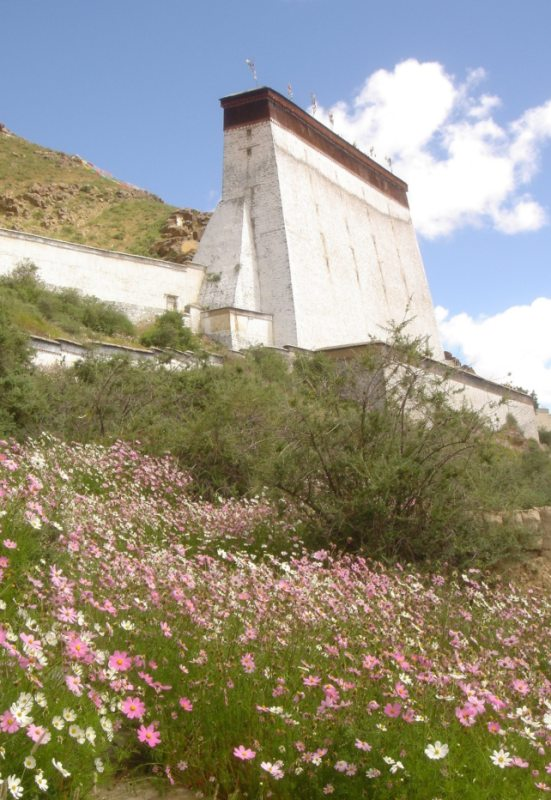
The thangka wall at Tashi Lhunpo Monastery, Tibet

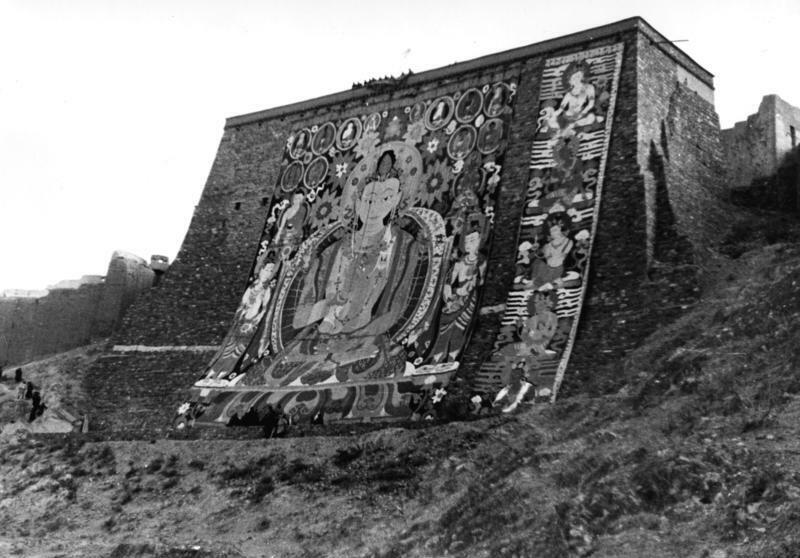
Large thangka hung on a wall at Gyantse in Tibet in 1938

A thongdrel (མཐོང་གྲོལ།) or throngdrel (also thongdroel or thongdrol) is a large appliqué (གོས་དྲུབ།) religious image normally only unveiled during tsechus(ཚེ་བཅུ།), the main religious festivals in Bhutan. They are the largest form of thangka(ཐང་ཀ།) paintings in the tradition of Tibetan Buddhism. Thongdrels typically depict a seated Guru Rinpoche surrounded by holy beings in a composition that, unlike most smaller thangkas, is in a "landscape" format, somewhat wider than it is tall.

Thongdrels are composed of several layers, mostly of silk. These begin with a backing, then the image itself, made up of appliqué pieces sewn to a background. Finally there is a yellow drape that covers and protects it when not on display. Thongdrels are stored rolled up. Thongdrels are displayed once a year as the highlight of the tsechu festival of a district or dzongkhag (although not every district has a thongdrel). Typically they are displayed on the last day of the tsechu. The painting is not allowed to be struck by the direct rays of the sun, thus it may be unfurled at around 3:00 in the morning and rolled back up by 7:30 AM.

Usually the architecture of the dzong provides a wall with access above, down which they may be unrolled, but sometimes metal hanging frames may be used. Major Tibetan centres have thangka walls, structures built into the defensive walls or other buildings specifically designed to give a large space for the display of festival thangkas.

The mere viewing of the unfurled thongdrel is said to cleanse the viewer of negative karma. They may also be exhibited at other important occasions such as royal coronations, when the thongdrel from a number of monasteries may be transported to appear.

== See also ==
- Culture of Bhutan
- Gwaebul, Korean versions
