= Taenghwa =

Type of Korean Buddhist visual art

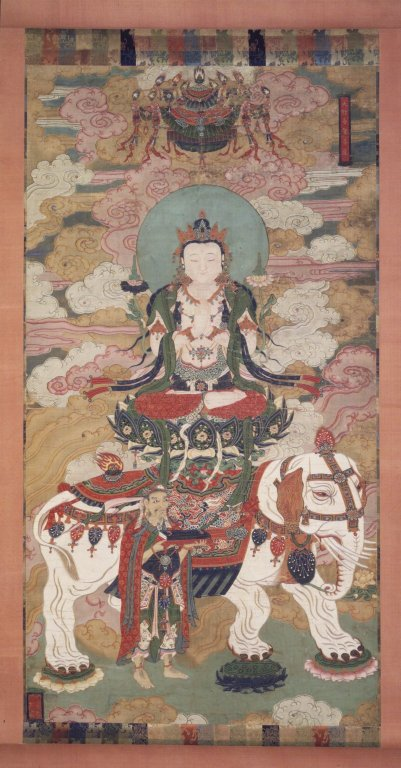
Buddhist hanging scroll from Joseon, cc. between 1768 and 1833, Brooklyn Museum

T'aenghwa (Hangul: 탱화, translation: "hanging-painting"; alternate: Hwaom zhenghua) is a characteristic type of Korean Buddhist visual art. A genre of Buddhist art, the paintings of icons can be on hanging scrolls, or framed pictures, or wall-paintings. T'aenghwa may be small, private and made for indoor display, or large and made for outdoor display. The craft is considered an extension of an earlier tradition of mural painting. There are no manuals that describe t'aenghwa painting, instead, the tradition preserves its models through paper stencils. Though most of the Koryo era t'aenghwa are held in Japanese collections, museums in Berlin, Boston, and Cologne carry some as well.

== History ==
The t'aenghwa tradition evolved from the Buddhist heritage that came to the Korean Peninsula during the Three Kingdoms period. The earliest paintings to survive date back to the late 13th century, late Koryo dynasty. The early korean buddhist painting followed the norms of Buddhism in Central Asia and Chinese buddhist art with regard to icon modelling and the use of stencils. Most of the early t'aenghwa were painted on silk gauze using mineral colours. Popular themes included the Pure Land Buddhism (Korean: Chont'o) and Avalokiteśvara. With the mongol invasions of Korea, Tibetan thangka and esoteric Vajrayana influences came during the Yuan rule. The Korean name taenghwa is very similar to the Tibetan word thangka and the period of popularity of banner paintings in both countries coincided. T'aenghwa were popular from the 17th century onwards. In the Chosŏn period, mural painting started to lose its popularity, making way for t'aenghwa. The scrolls were often hung behind the central Buddhist sculpture in a Buddhist temple. This was meant to enhance the sculptural image as well as provide an ambiance to the temple interior. Towards the end of the 20th century, t'aenghwa were in decline. The t'aenghwa was considered more of a craft than a high art practice, thus novice monks who showed talent were trained on the tradition by painting various mandatory images. Workshops were sometimes located within the temple grounds and it was here that painters shared their craft with pupils. In the past, painters worked on commission but with few competent masters of t'aenghwa painting left, the tradition may die out within the next couple of generations.

== Gallery ==
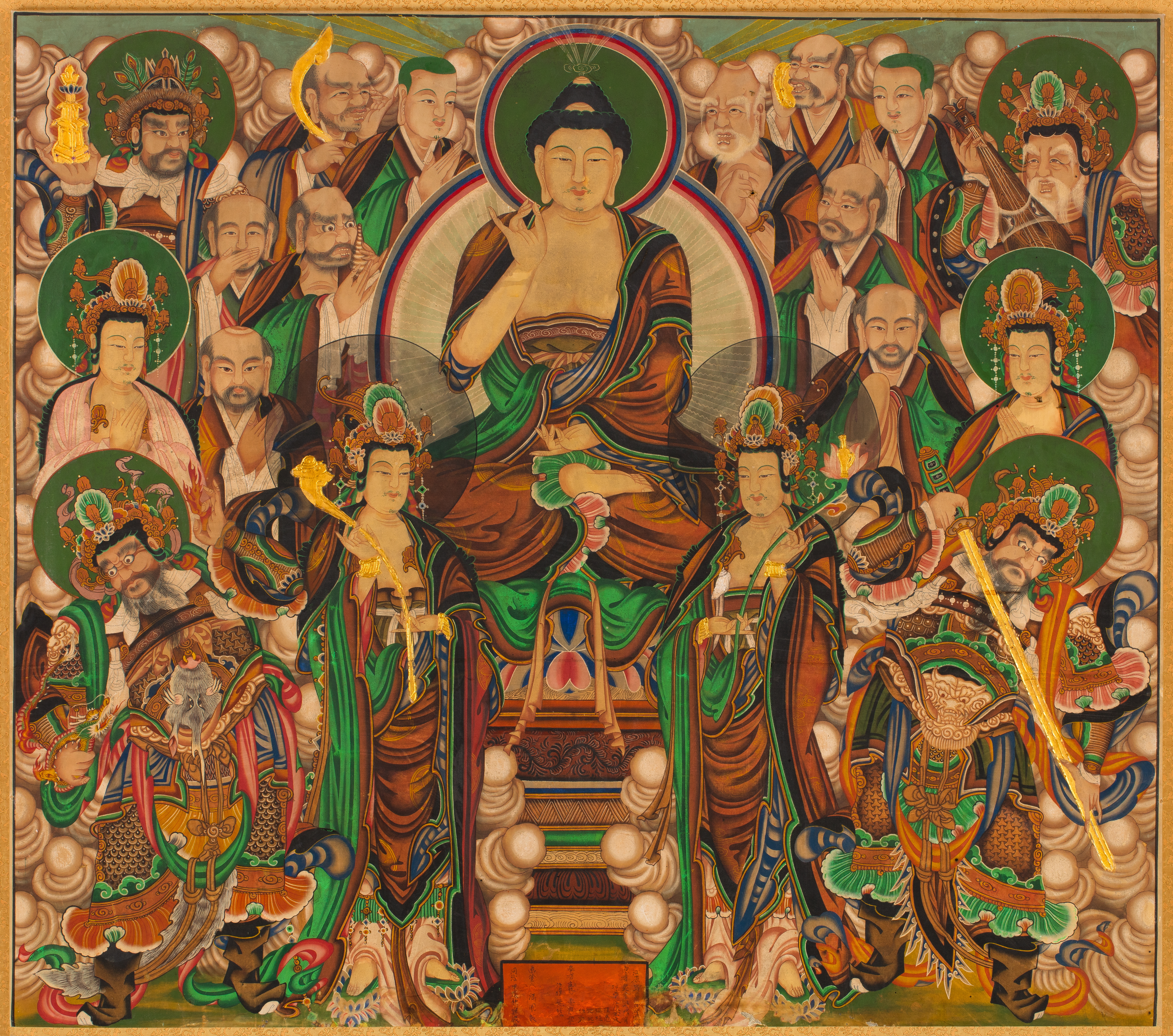
Rear Altar Buddhist Banner Painting, Joseon, Samcheok Municipal Museum

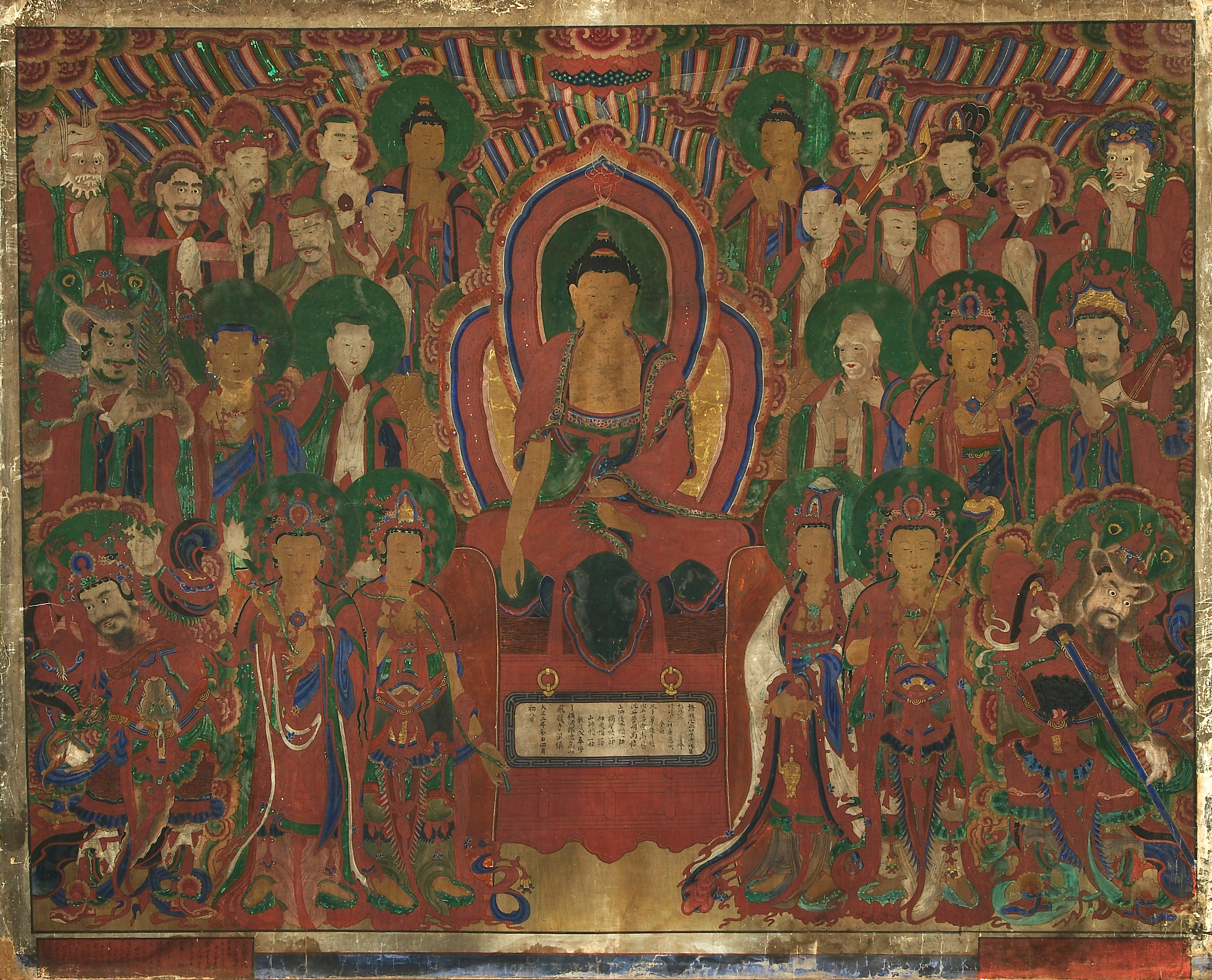
Shakyamuni Buddha Rear Altar Banner Painting, 1913, Bongboksa

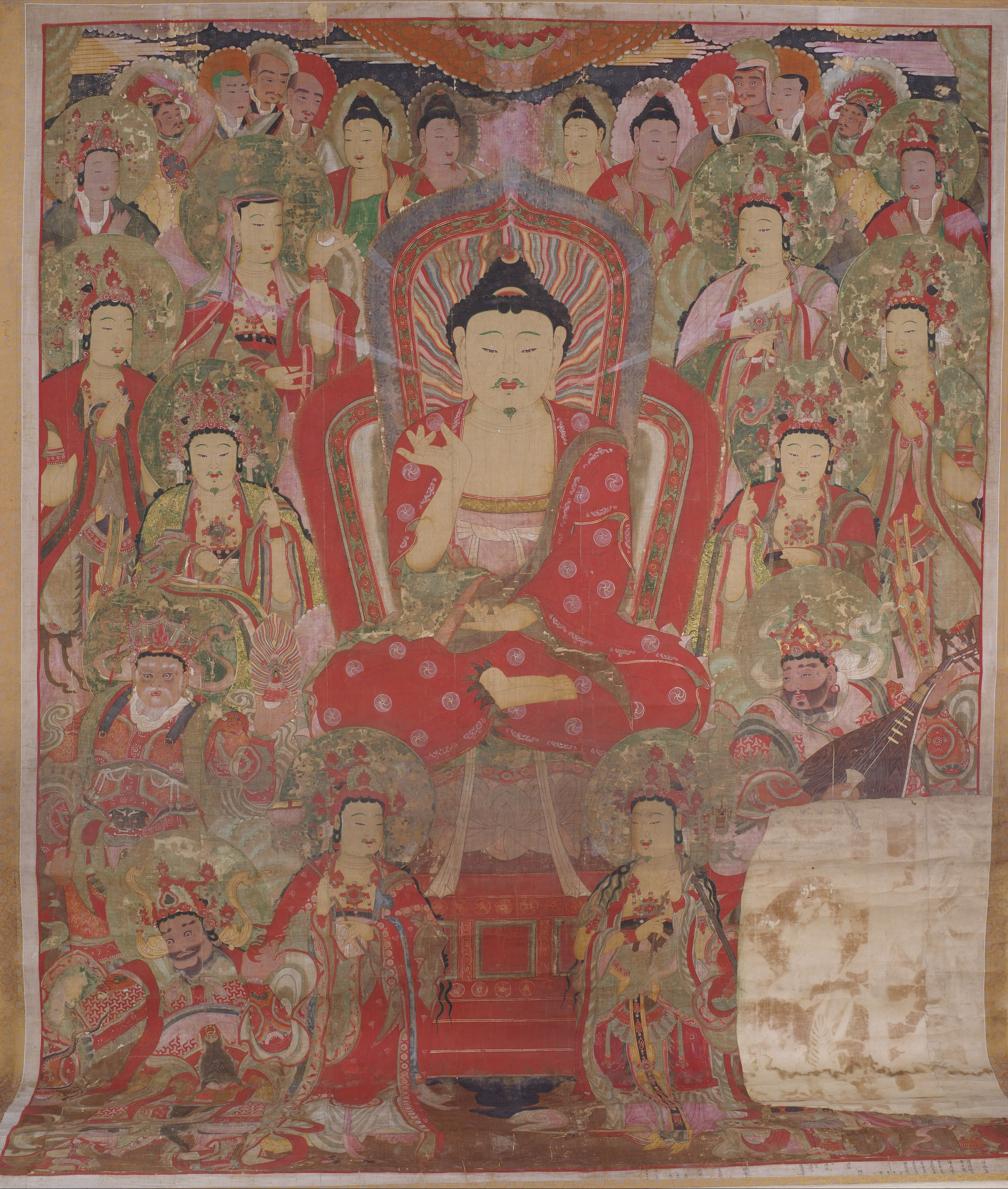
Amitabha Buddha’s Assembly in the Pure Land, Joseon, Dongguk University Museum

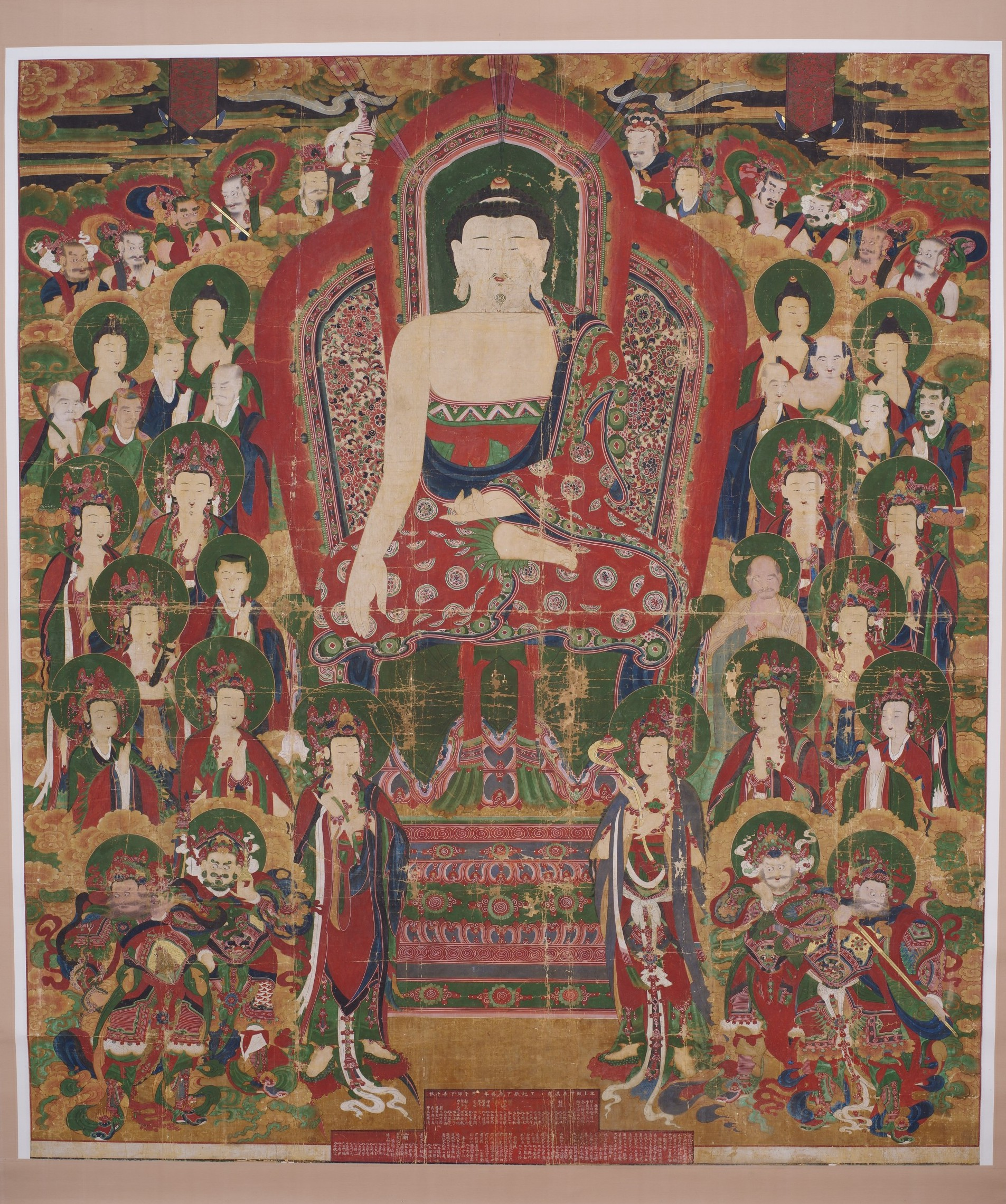
The Assembly on Vulture Peak, Joseon, Dongguk University Museum

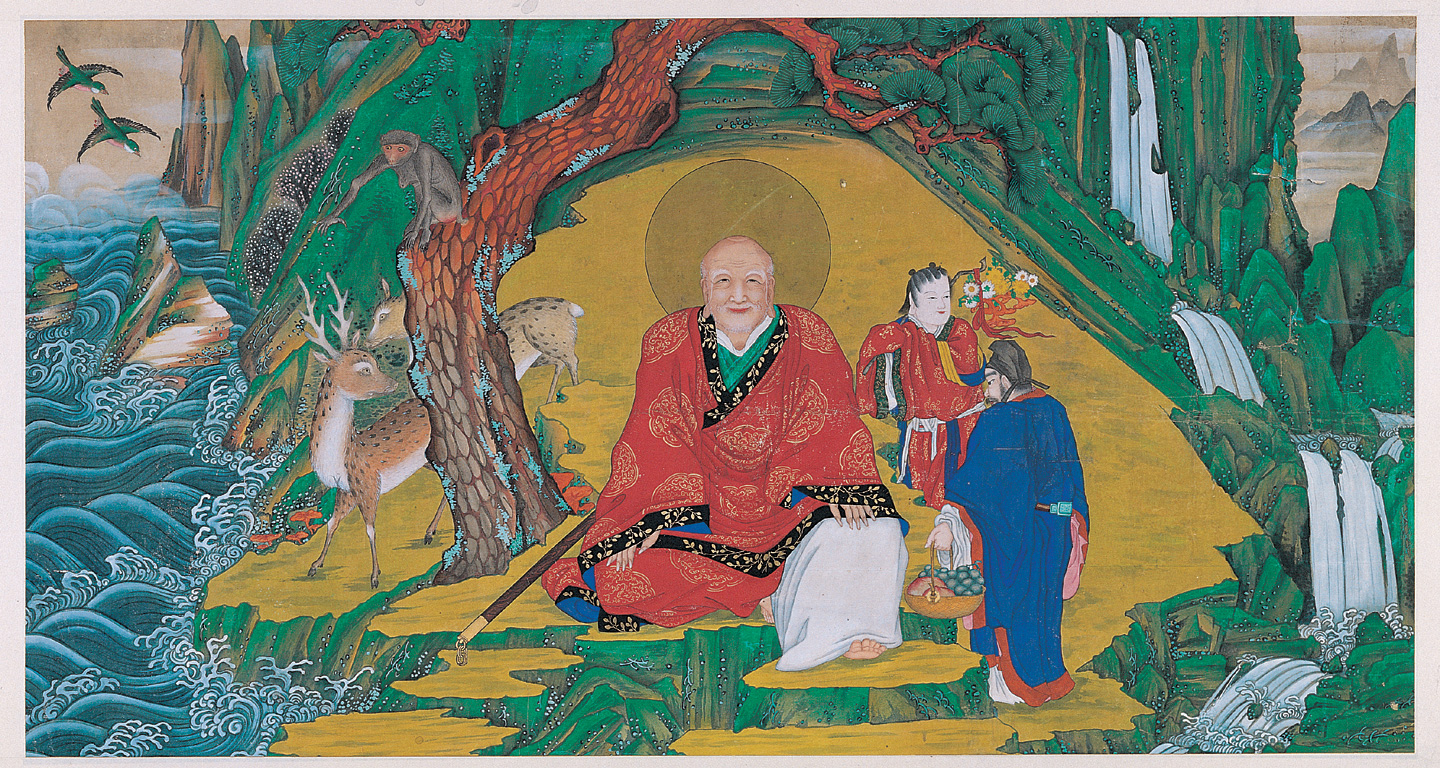
Large Mountain Spirit Banner Painting in Rich Colors, Joseon, Kyonggi University Museum

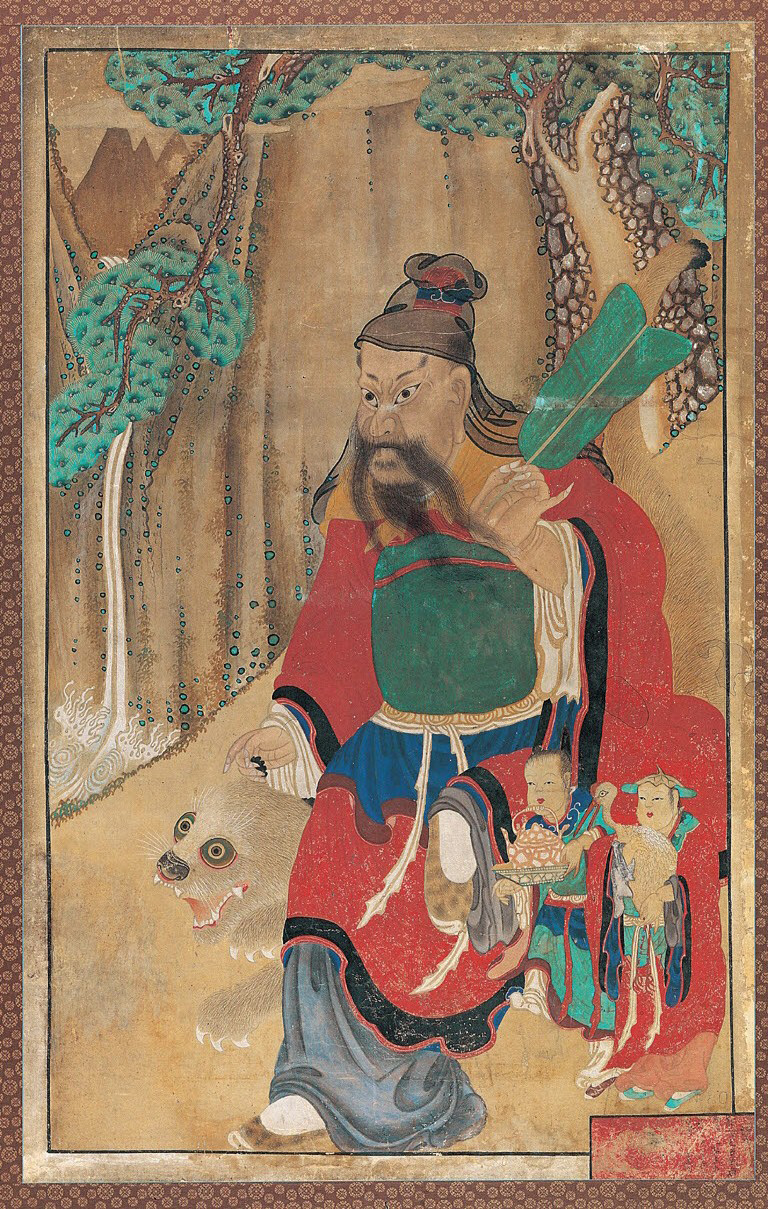
Large Rear Altar Banner Painting in Tang-style Coloring, Joseon, Kyonggi University Museum

== See also ==
- Gwaebul
