= Gwaebul =

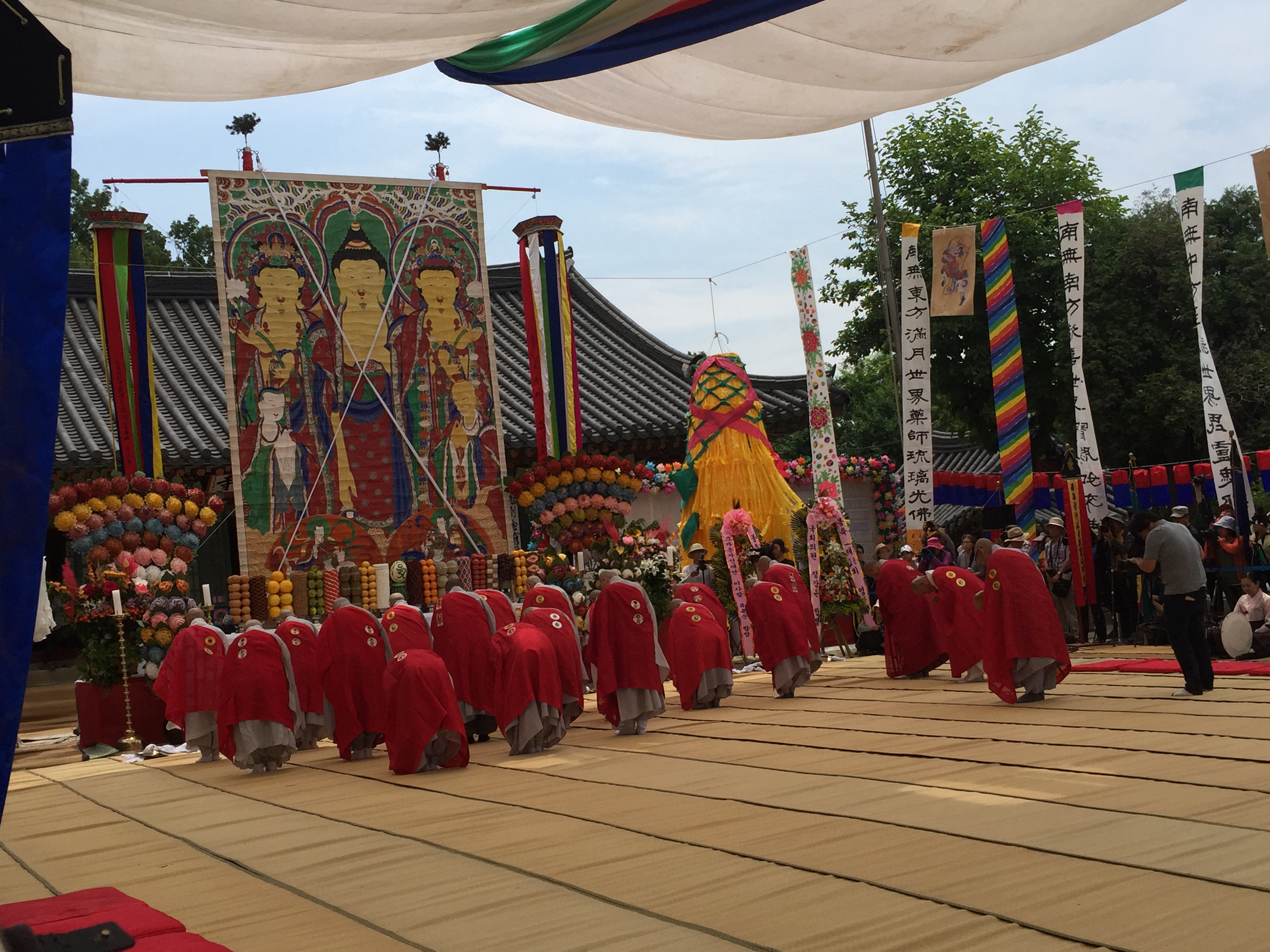
Seoul Tangible Cultural Heritage #363, the Bongwonsa Amita Gwaebul, on display during a festival at Yongamsa Temple in Seoul.

Gwaebul (괘불), meaning "Large Buddhist Banner Painting," are extremely large-scale Buddhist scroll paintings found throughout Korea. They are fairly rare, and only 53 were studied between 1986 and 2001. The paintings are typically brought out only rarely for special festivals or holidays such as Buddha's Birthday or Gwaebul Festivals when they are unrolled and hung from tall poles in the temple courtyard. When not in use, gwaebul are stored in a box behind the altar in a temple hall.

They compare with the thongdrels of Bhutanese and Tibetan art. These are made from applique silk, and in Tibetan monasteries thangka walls are constructed specially for their display.

== Status as Cultural Assets ==
Of the known gwaebul, seven have been designated as National Treasures, 47 as Treasures, and eight as Registered Cultural Heritage objects.

Name	Designation Status
Hanging Painting of Chiljangsa Temple (Five Buddhas)	National Treasure 296
Hanging Painting of Ansimsa Temple (The Vulture Peak Assembly)	National Treasure 297
Hanging Painting of Gapsa Temple (Buddha Triad)	National Treasure 298
Hanging Painting of Sinwonsa Temple (Rocana Buddha)	National Treasure 299
Hanging Painting of Janggoksa Temple (Maitreya Buddha)	National Treasure 300
Hanging Painting of Hwaeomsa Temple (The Vulture Peak Assembly)	National Treasure 301
Hanging Painting of Cheonggoksa Temple (The Vulture Peak Assembly)	National Treasure 302
Buddhist Hanging Painting of Cheongnyangsan Mountain	Treasure 1210
Hanging Painting of Chiljangsa Temple (Buddha Triad)	Treasure 1256
Hanging Painting of Cheongnyongsa Temple (The Vulture Peak Assembly)	Treasure 1257
Hanging Painting of Bosalsa Temple (The Vulture Peak Assembly)	Treasure 1258
Hanging Painting of Beopjusa Temple	Treasure 1259
Hanging Painting of Magoksa Temple (Sakyamuni Buddha)	Treasure 1260
Hanging Painting of Gwangdeoksa Temple (Rocana Buddha)	Treasure 1261
Hanging Painting of Yongbongsa Temple (The Vulture Peak Assembly)	Treasure 1262
Hanging Painting of Sudeoksa Temple (Rocana Buddha)	Treasure 1263
Hanging Painting of Gaesimsa Temple (The Vulture Peak Assembly)	Treasure 1264
Hanging Painting of Muryangsa Temple (Maitreya Buddha)	Treasure 1265
Hanging Painting of Geumdangsa Temple	Treasure 1266
Hanging Painting of Anguksa Temple (The Vulture Peak Assembly)	Treasure 1267
Hanging Painting of Naesosa Temple (The Vulture Peak Assembly)	Treasure 1268
Hanging Painting and the Sketch of Gaeamsa Temple (The Vulture Peak Assembly)	Treasure 1269
Hanging Painting of Eunhaesa Temple	Treasure 1270
Hanging Painting of Sudosa Temple (Rocana Buddha)	Treasure 1271
Hanging Painting of Bukjangsa Temple (The Vulture Peak Assembly)	Treasure 1278
Hanging Painting of Jungnimsa Temple (Sakyamuni Buddha)	Treasure 1279
Hanging Painting of Yulgoksa Temple	Treasure 1316
Hanging Painting and Storage Chest of Unheungsa Temple	Treasure 1317
Hanging Painting of Heungguksa Temple (Rocana Buddha)	Treasure 1331
Hanging Painting of Odeoksa Temple	Treasure 1339
Hanging Painting of Cheoneunsa Temple	Treasure 1340
Hanging Painting of Dorimsa Temple	Treasure 1341
Hanging Painting of Mihwangsa Temple	Treasure 1342
Hanging Painting of Dabosa Temple	Treasure 1343
Hanging Painting of Geumtapsa Temple	Treasure 1344
Hanging Painting of Manyeonsa Temple	Treasure 1345
Hanging Painting of Tongdosa Temple (Sakyamuni Buddha)	Treasure 1350
Hanging Painting of Tongdosa Temple	Treasure 1351
Hanging Painting of Yongheungsa Temple (Buddha Triad)	Treasure 1374
Hanging Painting of Chukseosa Temple	Treasure 1379
Hanging Painting of Seonamsa Temple (Sakyamuni Buddha)	Treasure 1419
Hanging Painting and Flagpole Supports of Jeokcheonsa Temple	Treasure 1432
Hanging Painting of Yongmunsa Temple, Yecheon (The Vulture Peak Assembly)	Treasure 1445
Hanging Painting of Yongmunsa Temple, Namhae	Treasure 1446
Hanging Painting of Yeongsusa Temple, Jincheon (The Vulture Peak Assembly)	Treasure 1551
Hanging Painting of Daeheungsa Temple, Haenam (The Vulture Peak Assembly)	Treasure 1552
Hanging Painting of Buseoksa Temple, Yeongju (Five Buddhas)	Treasure 1562
Hanging Painting of Seonseoksa Temple, Seongju (The Vulture Peak Assembly)	Treasure 1608
Hanging Painting of Bogyeongsa Temple, Pohang	Treasure 1609
Hanging Painting of Gimnyongsa Temple, Mungyeong (The Vulture Peak Assembly)	Treasure 1640
Hanging Painting of Bongjeongsa Temple, Andong (The Vulture Peak Assembly)	Treasure 1642
Hanging Painting of Anjeongsa Temple, Tongyeong (The Vulture Peak Assembly)	Treasure 1692
Hanging Painting of Ssanggyesa Temple, Hadong	Treasure 1695
Hanging Painting of Bongseonsa Temple, Namyangju (Vairocana Buddha Triad)	Treasure 1792
Hanging Painting of Yonghwasa Temple, Tongyeong	Registered Cultural Heritage 622
Hanging Painting of Dasolsa Temple, Sacheon	Registered Cultural Heritage 623
Hanging Painting of Uigoksa Temple, Jinju	Registered Cultural Heritage 624
Hanging Painting of Hwaamsa Temple, Wanju	Registered Cultural Heritage 625
Hanging Painting of Cheonhwangsa Temple	Registered Cultural Heritage 626
Hanging Painting of a Buddhist Assembly	Registered Cultural Heritage 627
Hanging Painting of Donghwasa Temple, Daegu	Registered Cultural Heritage 628
Hanging Painting of Daeseongam Hermitage, Goyang (Amitabha Buddha Triad)	Registered Cultural Heritage 649

== See also ==
- Taenghwa
- Thangka
