= Sinheungsa =

Buddhist temple in Sokcho, South Korea

- The Great Unification Buddha Tongil Daebul

Korean name
- Hangul: 신흥사
- Hanja: 新興寺
- RR: Sinheungsa
- MR: Sinhŭngsa

Sinheungsa (Korean: 신흥사), sometimes spelled Shinheungsa, is a head temple of the Jogye Order of Korean Buddhism. It is situated on the slopes of Seoraksan in Sokcho, Gangwon Province, South Korea.

Sinheungsa is located in Seoraksan National Park, and many tourists hiking Seoraksan up to Ulsanbawi (peak) pass by the temple on the way. Other temples with the name Sinheungsa are located in Seoul, Samcheok and Icheon.

== Origins ==
Historical accounts vary as to whether this ancient Zen (Seon) temple was first constructed by Jajang in 653, first called Hyangseongsa (Temple of Zen Buddhism), or in 637 following his return from Tang China. It burned to the ground in 699, was rebuilt in 710, burned again in 1645 and was rebuilt in 1648 at its present location by Uisang. This temple is believed to be the oldest Zen (Seon) temple in the world.

The temple saw a large presence of US armed forces due to its proximity to the DMZ. As a result the a set of paintings depicting Shakyamuni and the Ten Kings of Hell (1755 and 1789 respectively) were stolen by US armed personnel and ended up in the collections of the Los Angeles County Museum of Art and the Metropolitan Museum of Art between 1998–2007. The LACMA paintings were repatriated in 2020 and the Met painting was repatriated in November 2025. The case is seen as a landmark moment of cooperation between the Jogye Order and American museums.

== Bronze Buddha ==
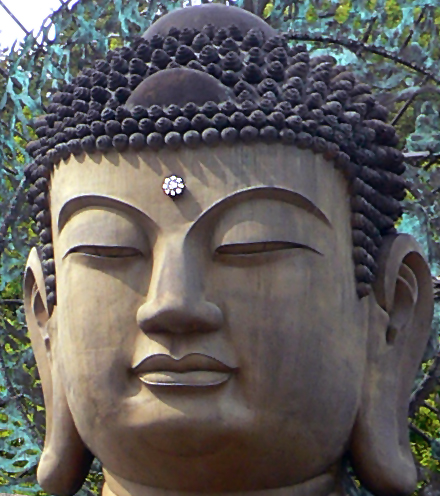
Tongil Daebul closeup showing center forehead adornment, half closed eyes and slight smile

The Great Unification Buddha, a 14.6-meter/48-foot, 108 ton gilt-bronze Buddha statue, called "Tongil Daebul", sits atop a 4.3-meter/15-foot high pedestal, of the same material, making the total height 18.9-meter/62-foot, excluding the lightning rod and nimbus.

The lotus pedestal is flanked with 16 delicately engraved panels and the forehead of Tongil Daebul is adorned with eight 8-centimeter/3-inch stones of amber, with a single piece of jade in the center that is 10-centimeter/4-inch in diameter.

Tongil Daebul sits with legs crossed and half-closed eyes in meditation, his lips displaying a perceptible smile. A flowing robe with gentle folds, revealing the right shoulder, drapes the Buddha's robust torso. The hands of Tongil Daebul are positioned in the mudra symbolizing the "enlightened one."

Contained within the hollow statue are three pieces of the Buddha's sari, remains collected after his cremation, donated by the Myanmar government, and the Tripitaka, the original Buddhist scriptures.

The project to construct this statue of the Buddha cost 3.8 billion won ($4.1 million), raised through the contributions for over a decade from over 300,000 small donations from anonymous donors visiting the temple.

This statue is dedicated to Korean reunification sentiment.

== Gallery ==
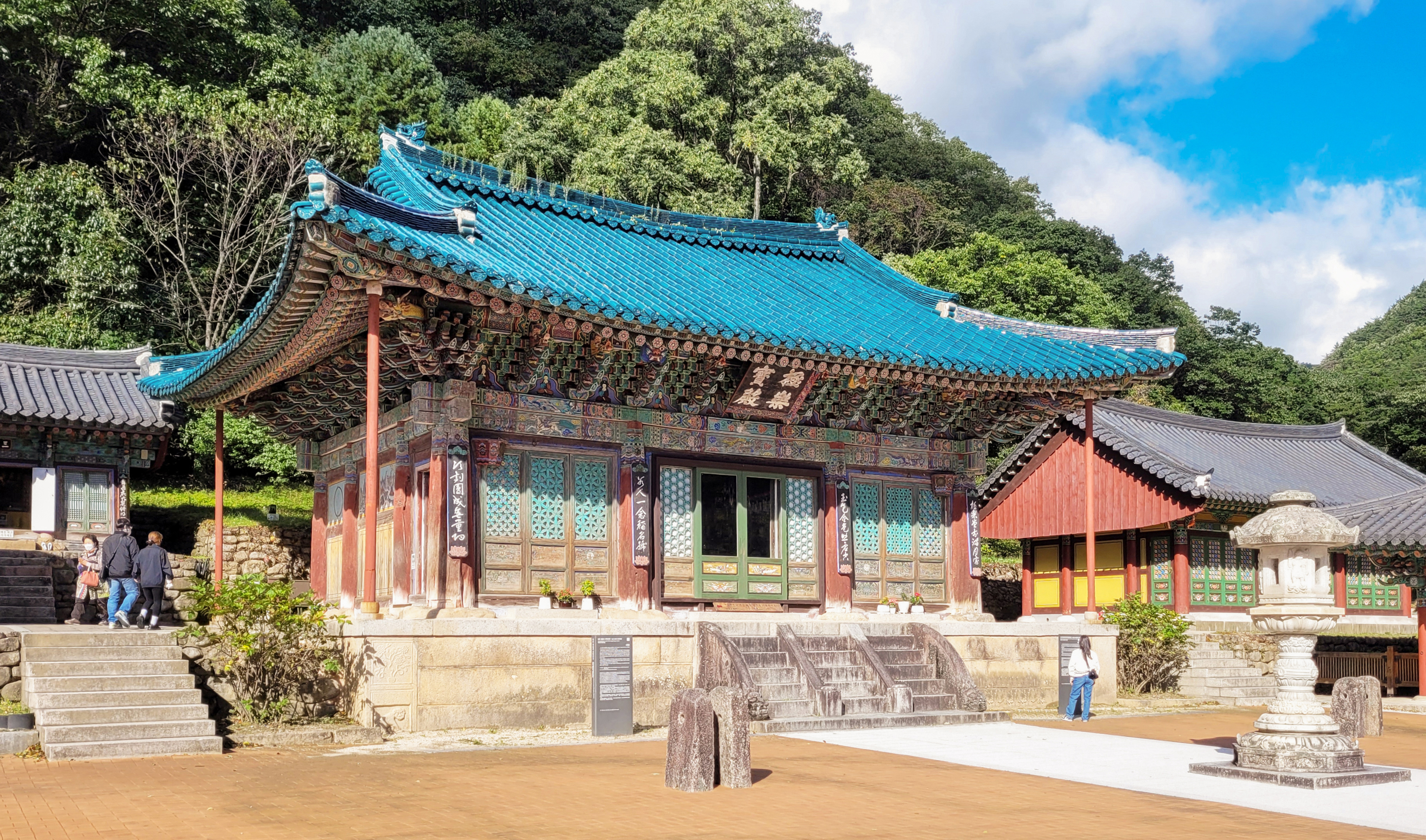
Geungnakbojeon

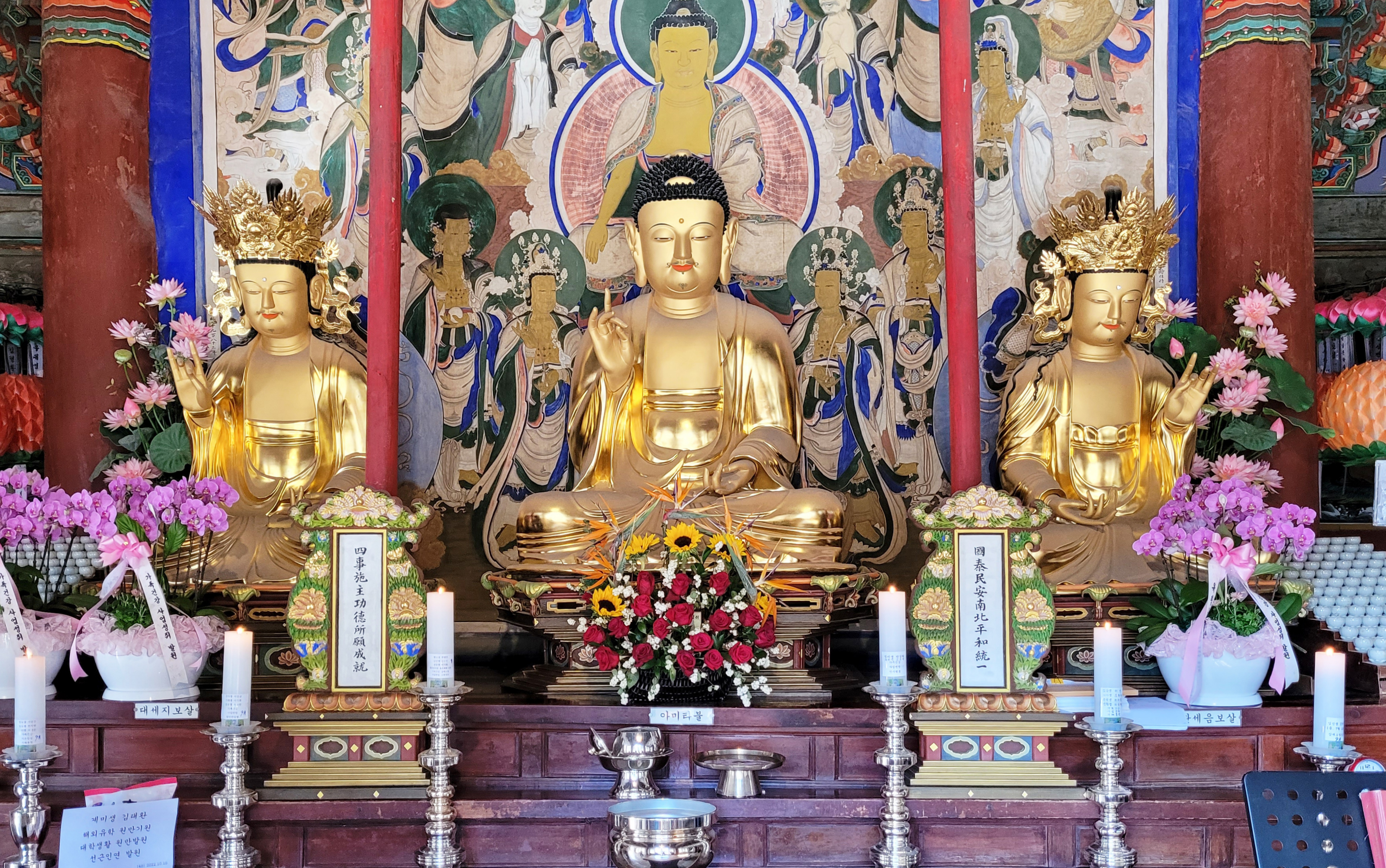
Wooden Seated Amitabha Buddha Triad

Bojero (pavilion) built in 1770

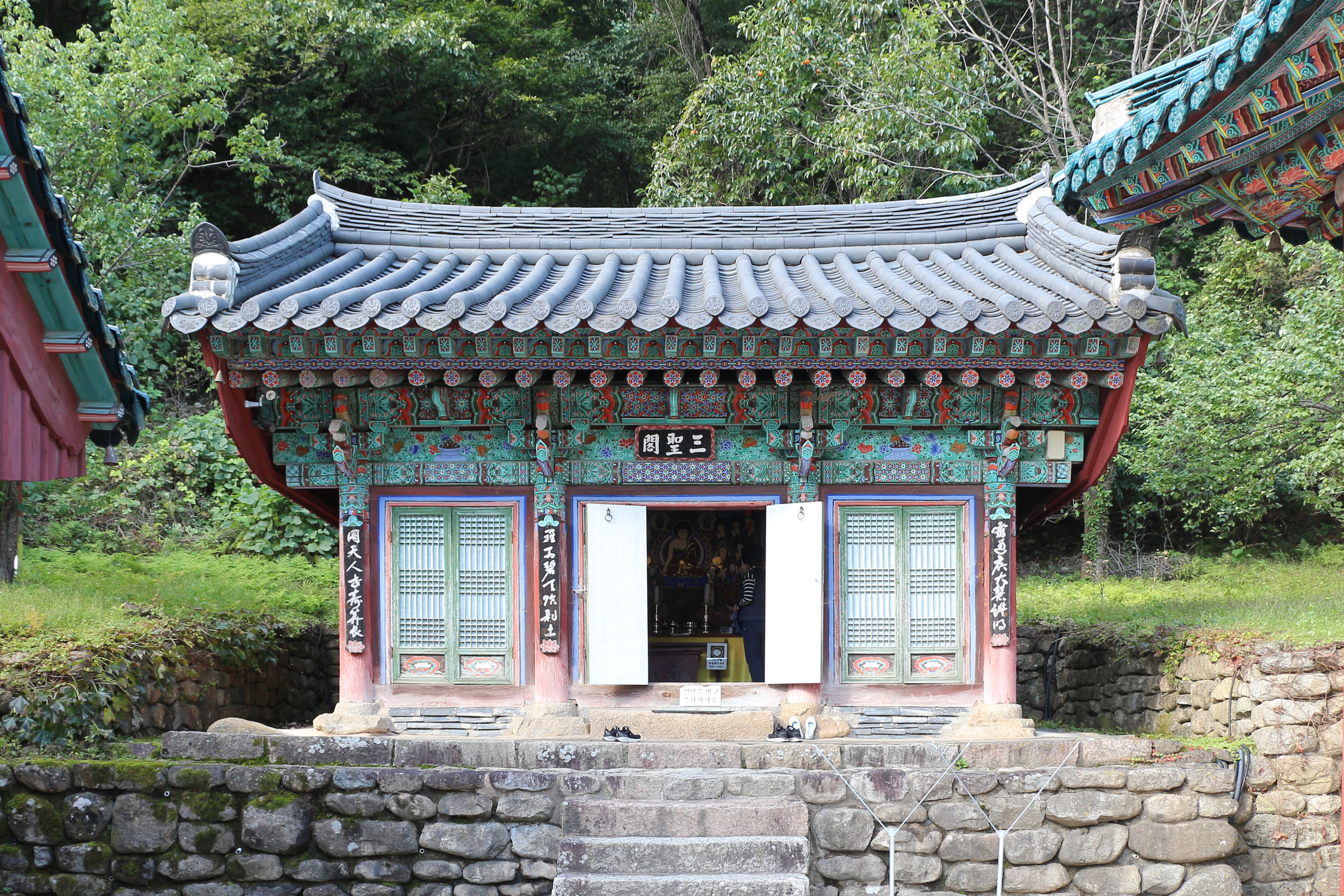
Samseong-gak Hall

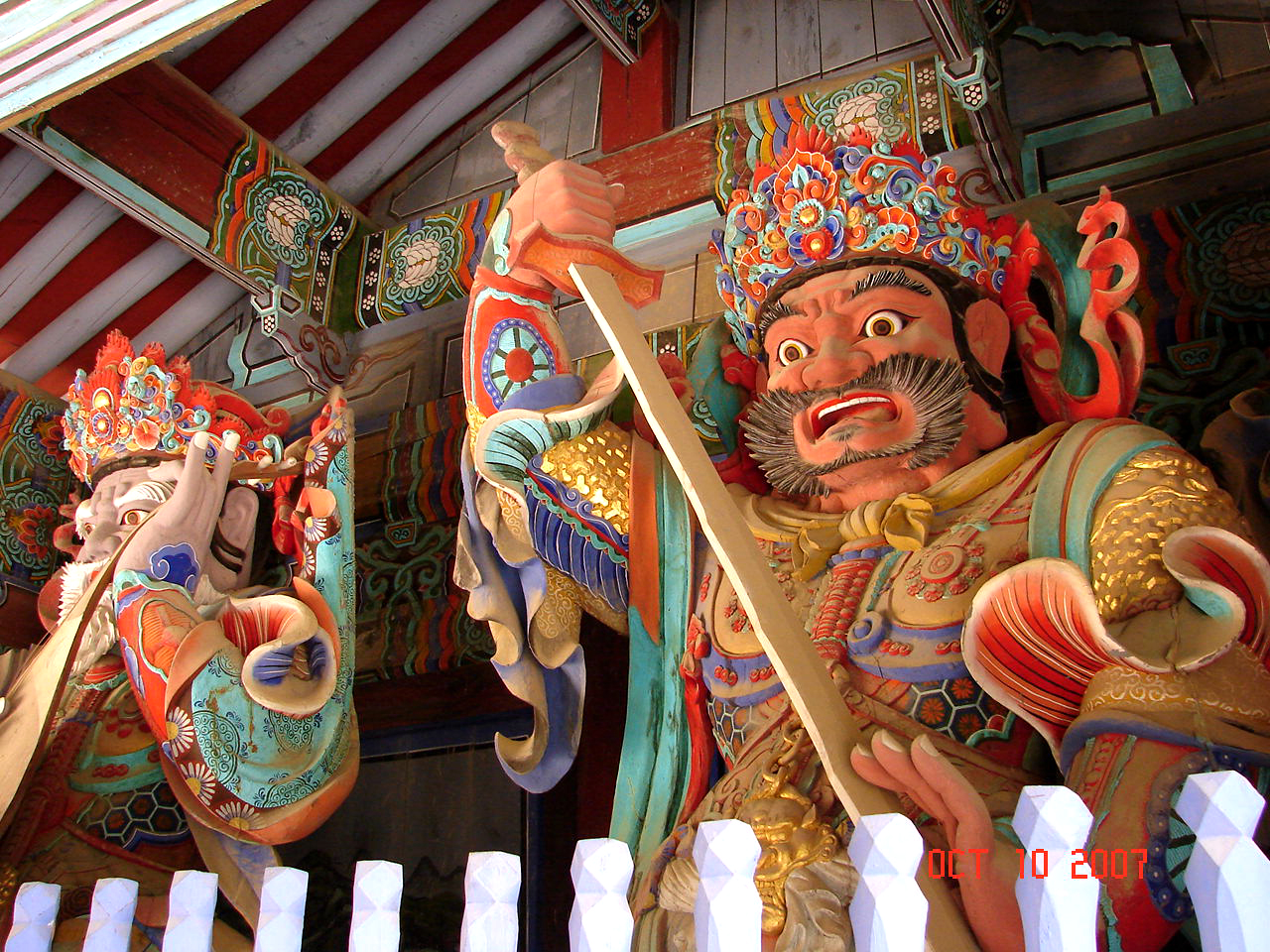
Gate Guardian Deva Kings at Sinheungsa

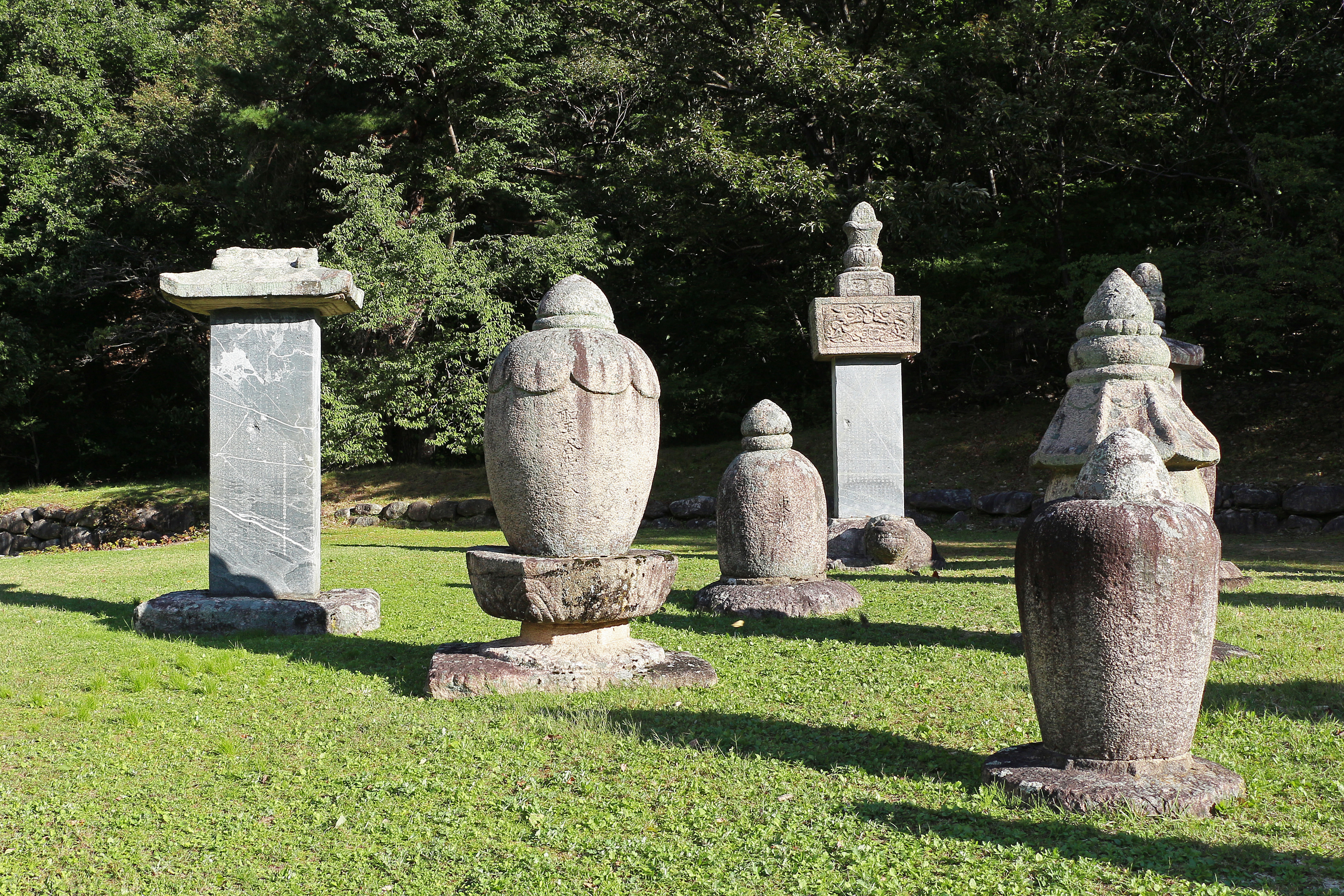
Steles and stupas at Sinheungsa

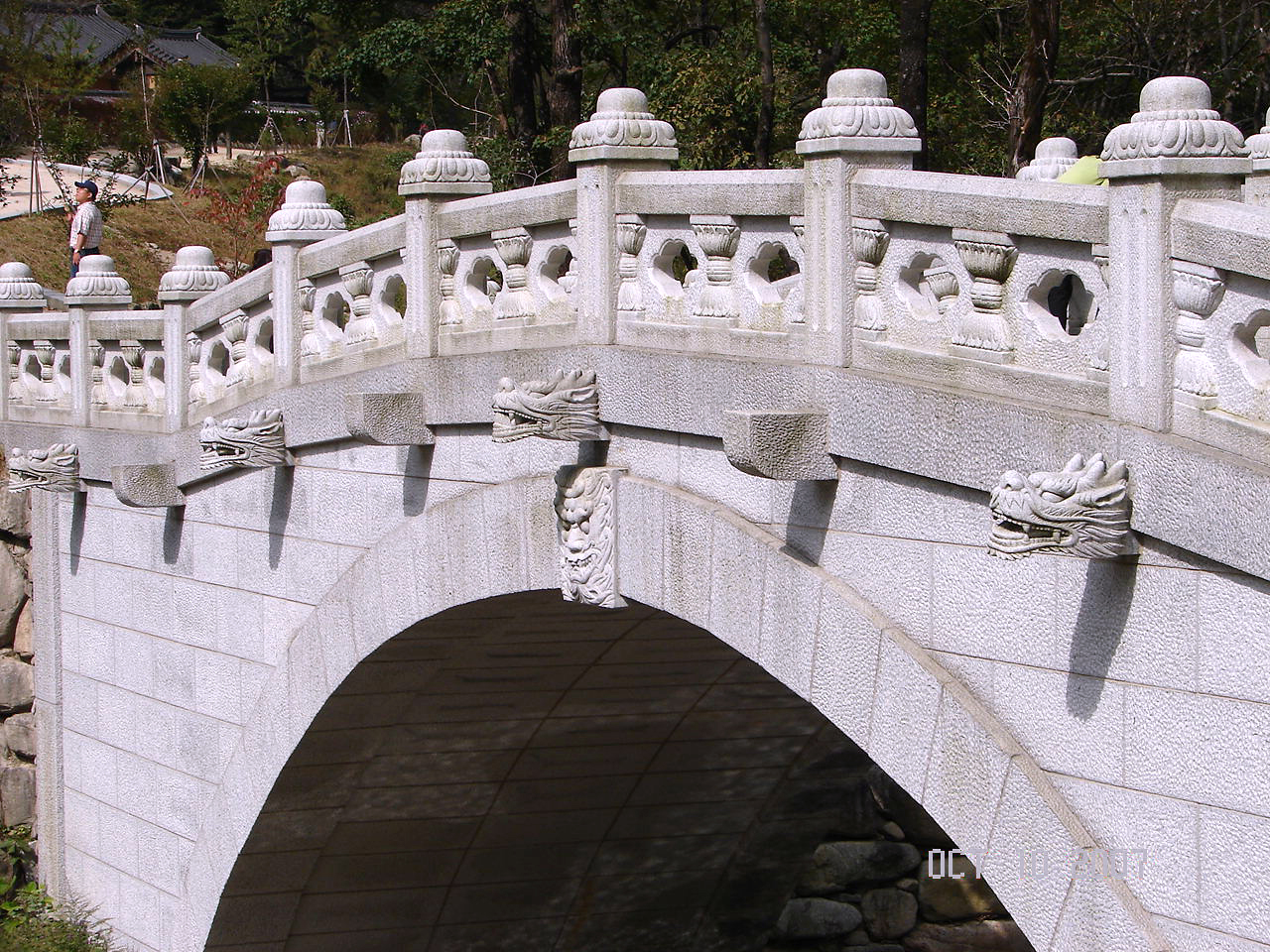
Hyeonsugyo

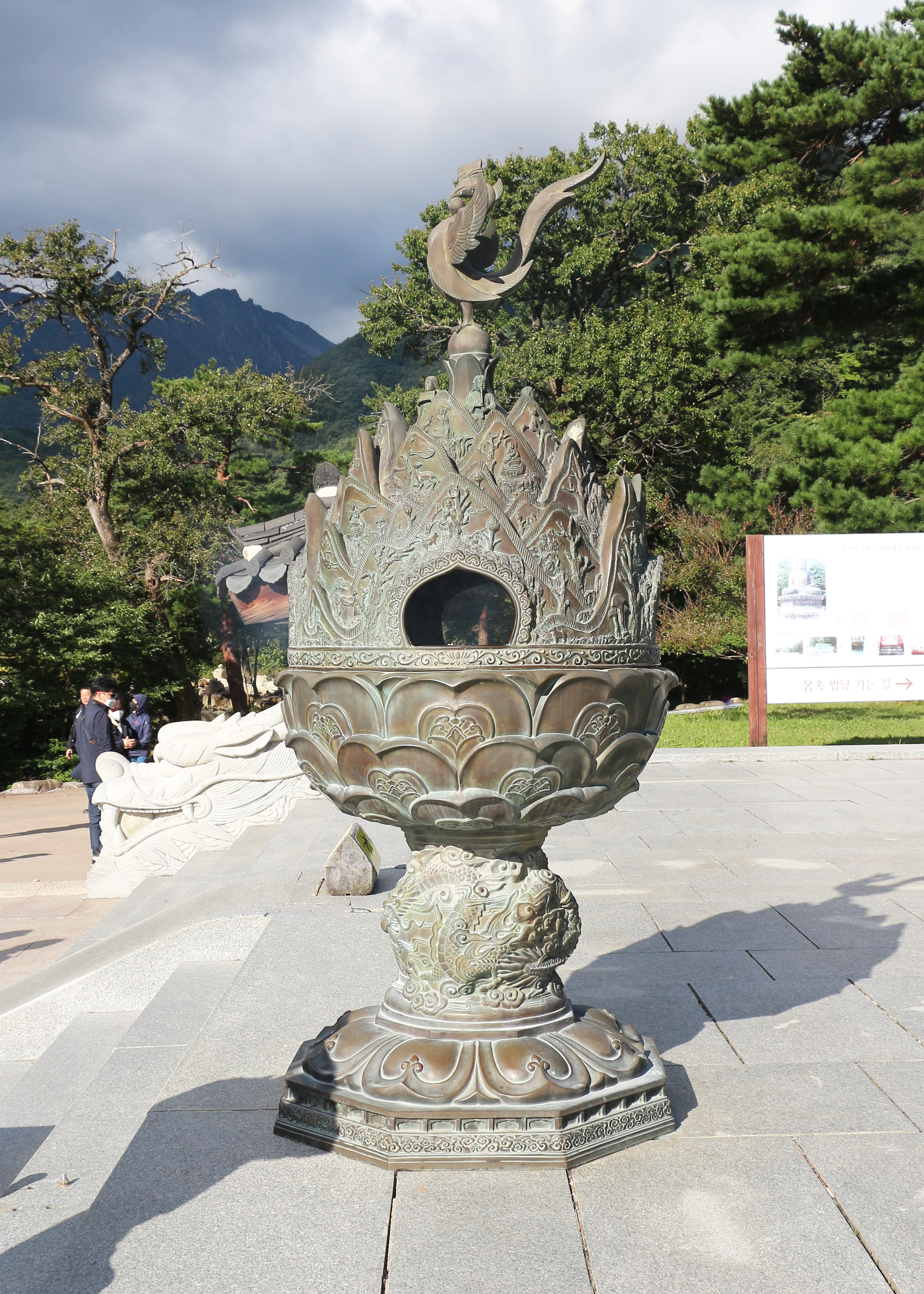
Incense burner

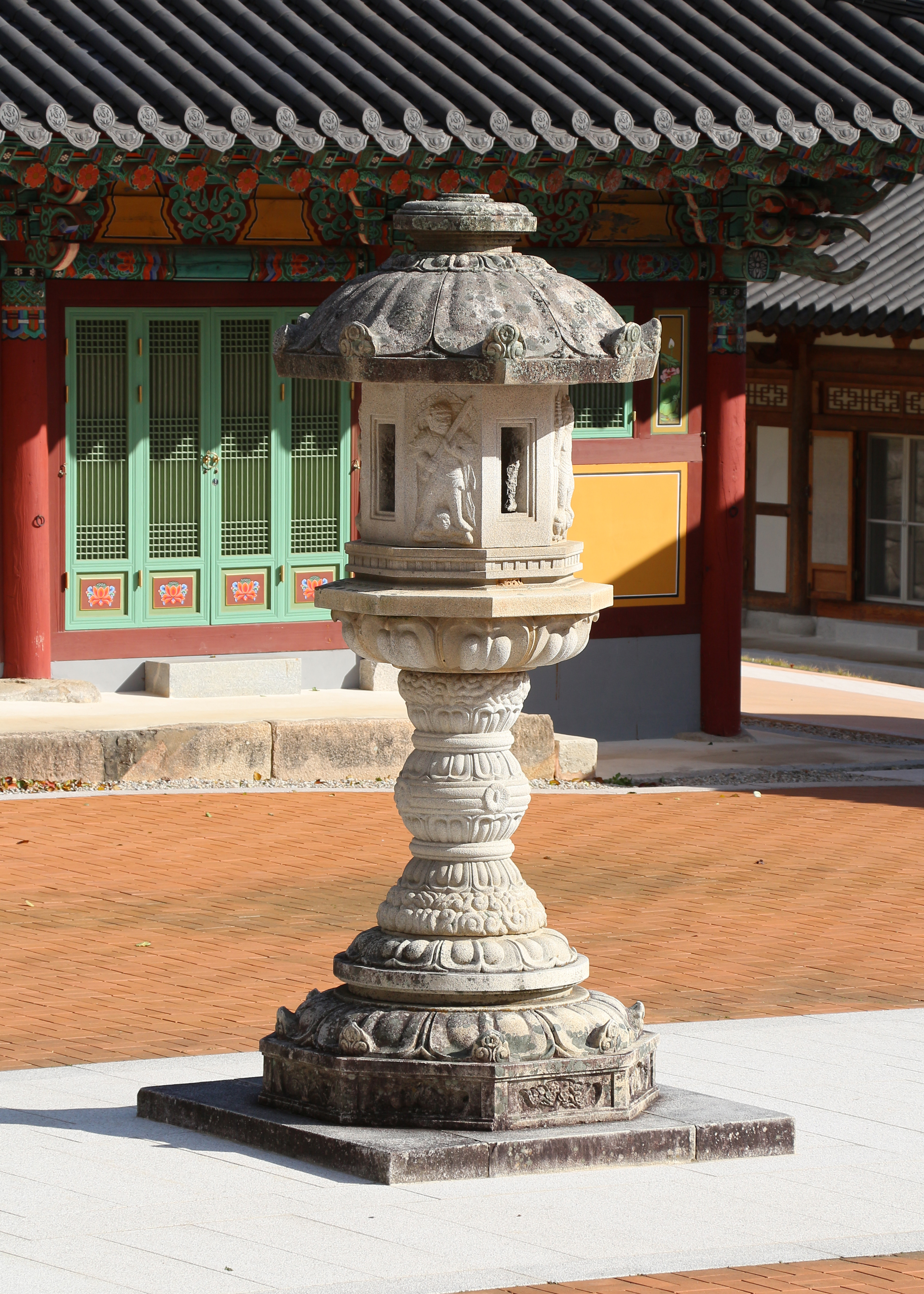
Stone lantern

== See also ==
- Korean Buddhist temples
- Korean Buddhism
- Religion in South Korea
