= Thangka wall =

Structures in Tibet to display thangkas during festivals

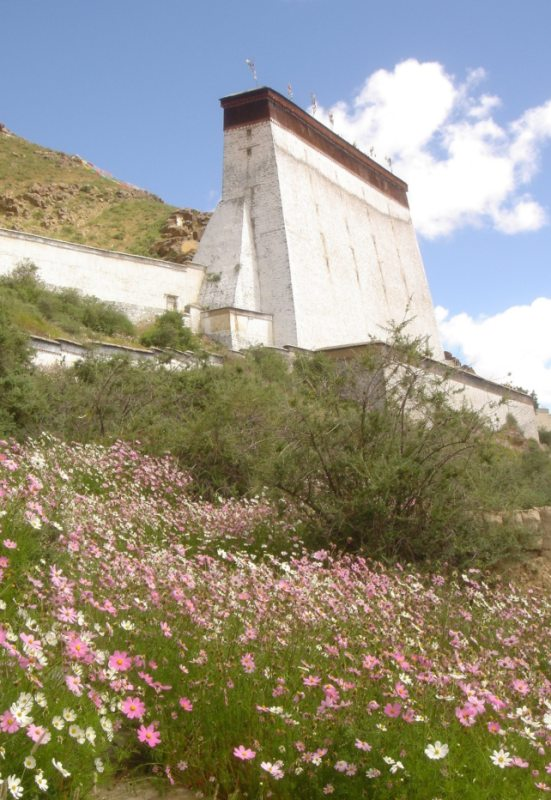
The giant thangka wall at Tashilhunpo monastery in Shigatse. It is about 32 metres high by 42 metres wide (at the base) and built in 1468.

A thangka wall is, in Tibetan religious architecture, a stone-built structure used for hanging giant, or monumental, appliqued thangkas, or scrolls, in some of the major Buddhist monasteries of Tibet. These giant thangkas are called gos ku, goku, gheku, kiku (cloth image) in Tibetan, and thongdrel in Bhutan. The thangka wall stands on a hillside from where it overlooks the monastic settlement. Its form is that of a narrow, elongated and tall rectangular building with a battered façade and a flat roof surrounded by a parapet. The side and rear walls are normally vertical.

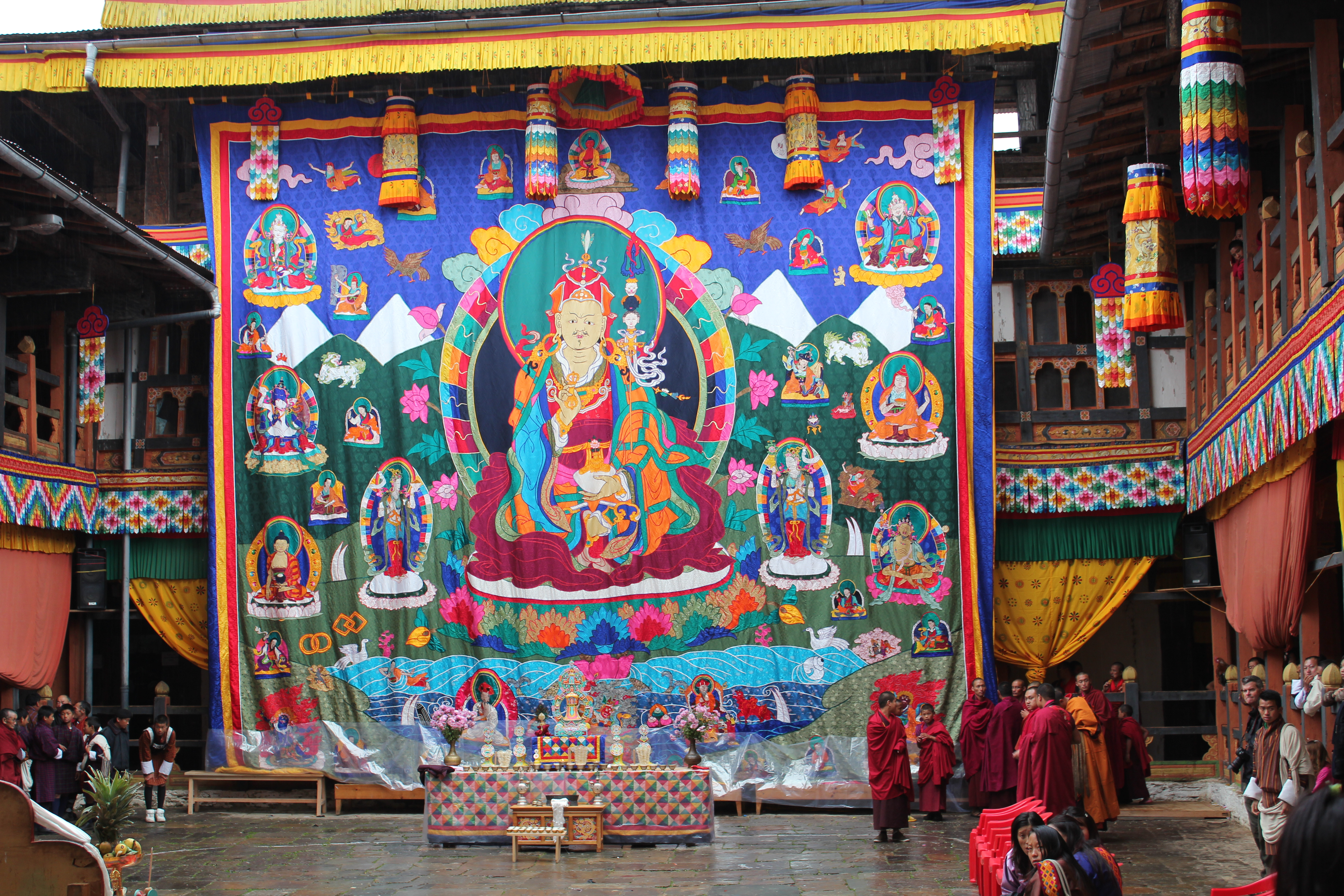
Large festival thangka hung in the courtyard at Jakar Dzong in Bhutan.

Thangkas are only displayed hung on the walls on special occasions such as major festivals, when they are or were unrolled by monks at the top of the wall, with considerable ceremony. Tibetan Buddhists believe that viewing the thangka with the proper spirit brings great spiritual benefits. Often the thangka was only displayed on one day in the year.

Smaller monasteries that lack a special thangka wall, like those in Bhutan, may hang their large thangkas from the other monastery buildings, often in the main courtyard. This was presumably the practice everywhere before the emergence of special thangka walls. The creation of silk appliqué thangkas appears to have begun in China, perhaps in the 14th century, using existing Chinese textile techniques to copy painted Tibetan thangkas. These reached Tibet, where they were well received, and the Tibetans, also already used to silk appliqué for decorating tents and clothes, began to make their own. Initially these were relatively small, for hanging inside prayer-halls, but by at least the 15th century some were being made large enough that large outside locations were needed to display them.

== Tibetan designations ==
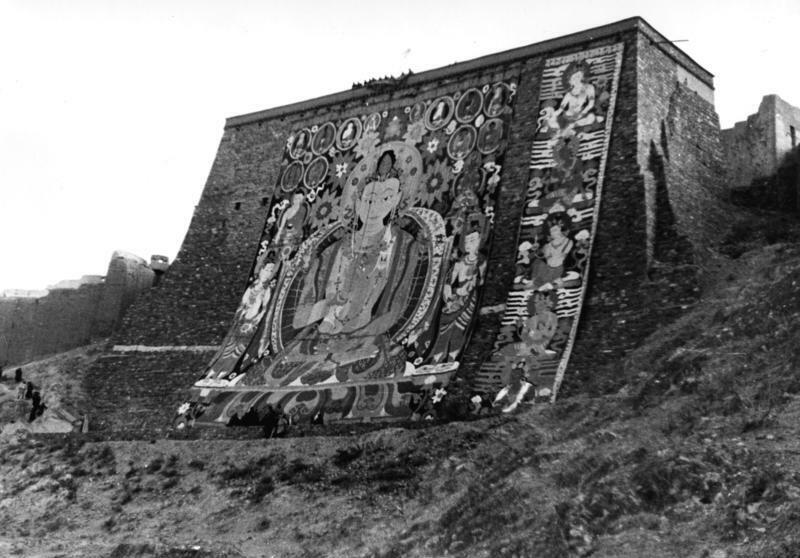
A large thangka hung on a thangka wall at Gyantse in Tibet in 1938. A large central banner and a narrower side one are displayed on the sloping front.

At Tashilhunpo monastery in Shigatse, the thangka wall has had the following designations:

- kugopea (Samuel Turner, 1800);
- gö-ku-pea (Laurence Austin Waddell, 1895), i.e. cloth-image tower;
- kiku tamsa (Laurence Austine Waddell, 1895; William Carey, 1901; Sarat Chandras Das, 1902), i.e. cloth-image support;
- gos-sku-spe'u (Michael Aris, 1982), i.e. cloth-image tower support.

At Palcho Chode monastery in Gyantse, the thangka wall is called

- gheku tower (Victor Chan, 1994), i.e. cloth-image tower;
- goku tramsa (The Tibet Album, 2006) or gos sku thang sa (Michael Henss, 2011), i.e. cloth-image support.

The words kugo, gos-sku, goku, gheku and kiku refer to the monumental thangka (kugo being apparently the result of inverting the two syllables of goku while gheku and kiku are supposed to be informal pronunciations of gos sku or goku).

== Architectural designations ==
In English-language writings, this type of building is referred to as "thangka wall" (Victor Chan, 1994; Andreas Gruschke, 2001; The Tibet Album, 2006; Michael Henss, 2011; Tibet, Lonely Planet, 2015; Diana Lange, 2016), or sometimes "support wall" (Tibet, Lonely Planet, 2015) or "display wall" (Ronald M. Bernier, 1997).

American explorer F. Bailey Vanderhoef Jr. uses the term "pylon" in his memoirs published in 1938.

In the original captions attached to the photos taken by the 1938–39 German expedition to Tibet, the Palcho Chode edifice is called große Gebetsmauer (large prayer wall) while its counterpart at Tashilhunpo is termed große Tangamauer (large thangka wall).

== Inventory ==
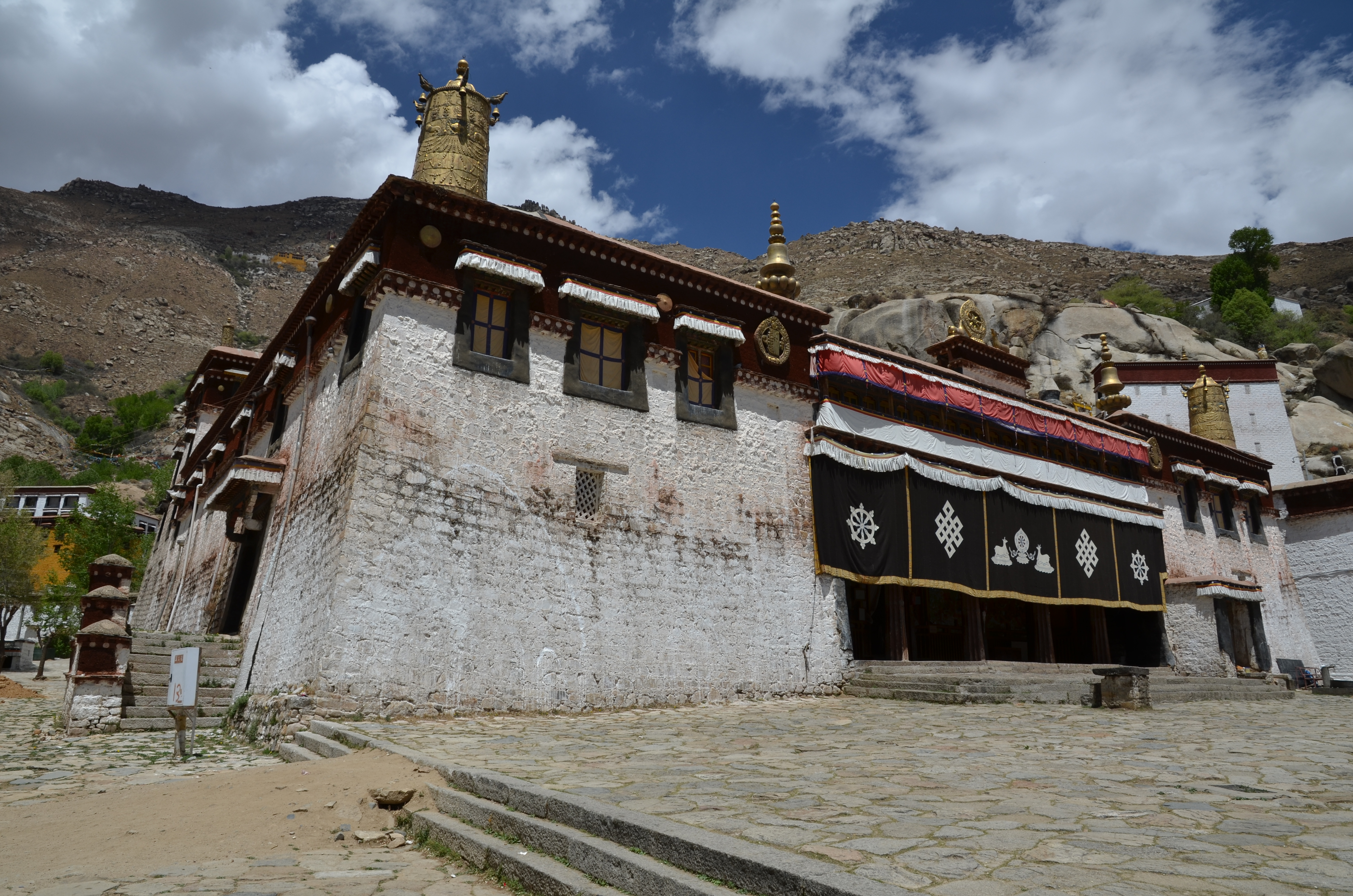
Sera Monastery, near Lhasa, in 2011. The thangka wall can be seen in the right upper corner.

At least four large monasteries in China's Tibet Autonomous Region possess a giant thangka wall : Sera (Lhasa), Palcho Chode (Gyantse), Tashilhunpo (Shigatse) and Riwo Dechen (Qonggyai). The walls at Sera and Riwo Dechen are recent additions while those at Tashilhunpo and Palcho Chode are centuries-old monuments.

=== Sera (Lhasa) ===
The thangka wall at Sera stands near the Chöding hermitage (Tsongkhapa's retreat before the monastery was built). The wall is a recent replacement to a scaffolding erected on a slope. It has some semblance to its counterpart at Tashilhunpo (see beneath). The wall is used for lifting giant thangkas of the Buddha during the Shoton festival in August. The wide yard fronting the building is where the faithful gather to gaze on the giant thangkas.

=== Palcho Chode (Gyantse) ===
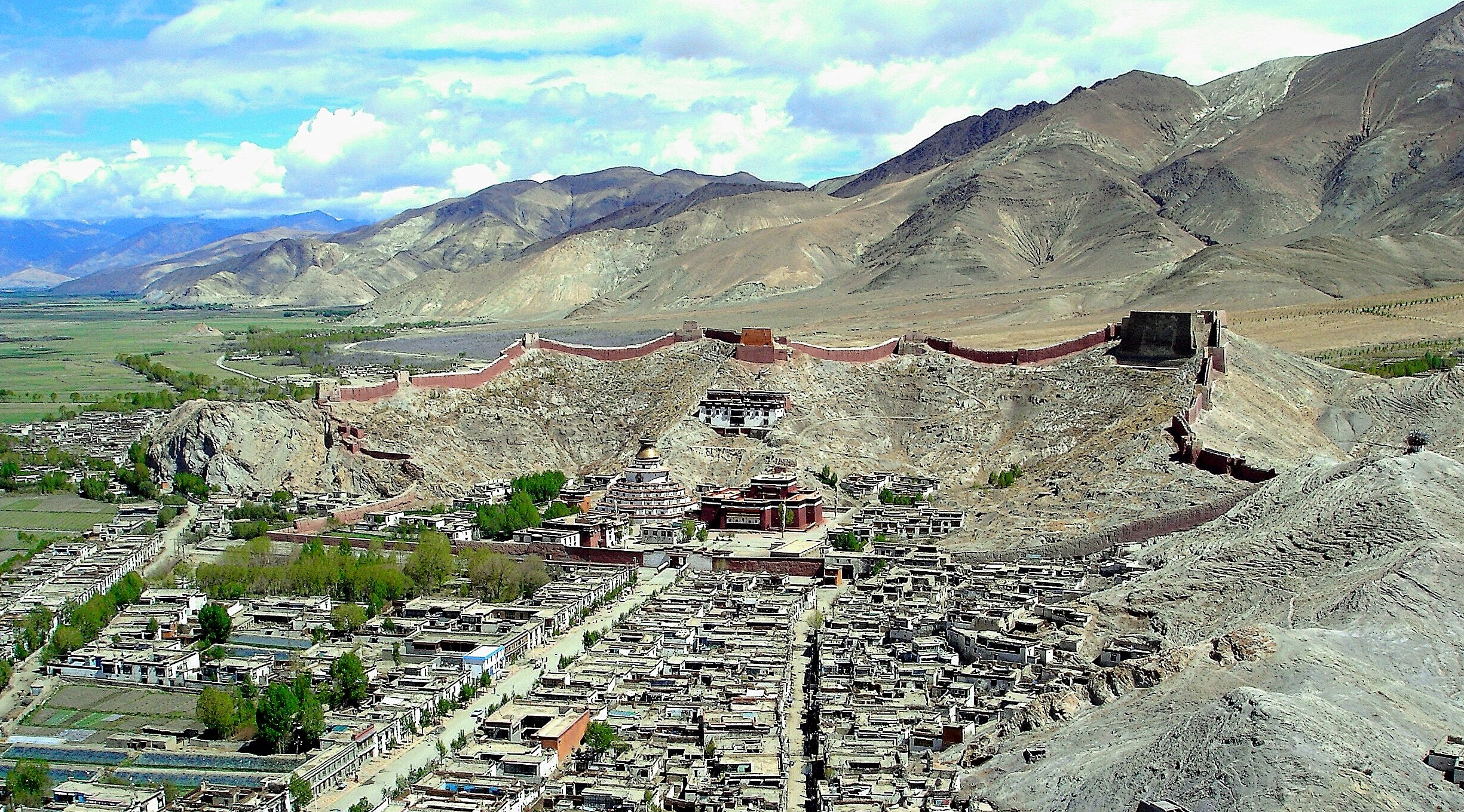
View of the Palcho Chode monastery from the Gyantse dzong. The thangka wall is the large building in the right upper corner of the picture.

The massive, stark thangka wall at Palcho Chode towers above a hillside in the north-eastern part of the monastic enclosure built in 1425. The building of the wall is not supposed to have taken place before the 1430s when the associated monumental thangkas were commissioned.

During the Gyantse festival in the fourth month of the Tibetan year, the wall is used, within a two-year cycle, to display the Sakyamuni thangka in alternation with the Maitreya thangka. A third one, the Dīpankara thangka, is no longer displayed due to its poor state of repair.

=== Tashilhunpo (Shigatse) ===
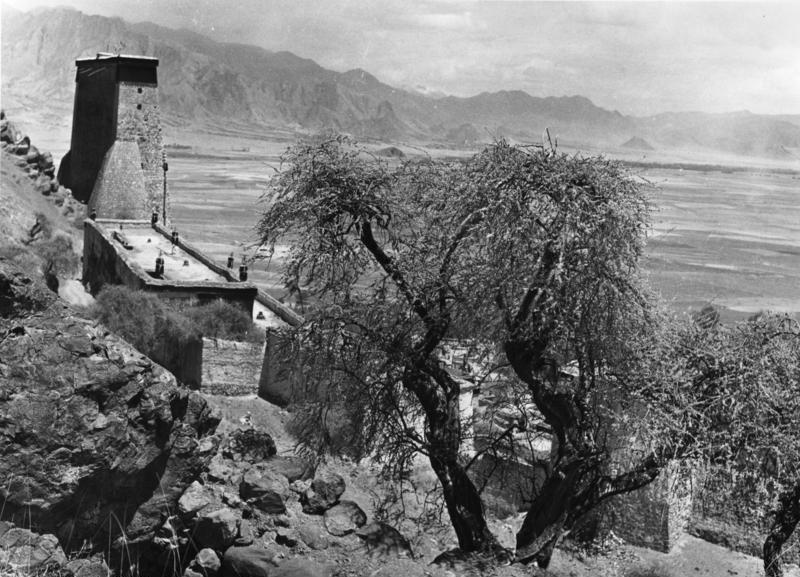
Side view or the Tashilhunpo große Tangamauer (large thangka wall) in 1938.

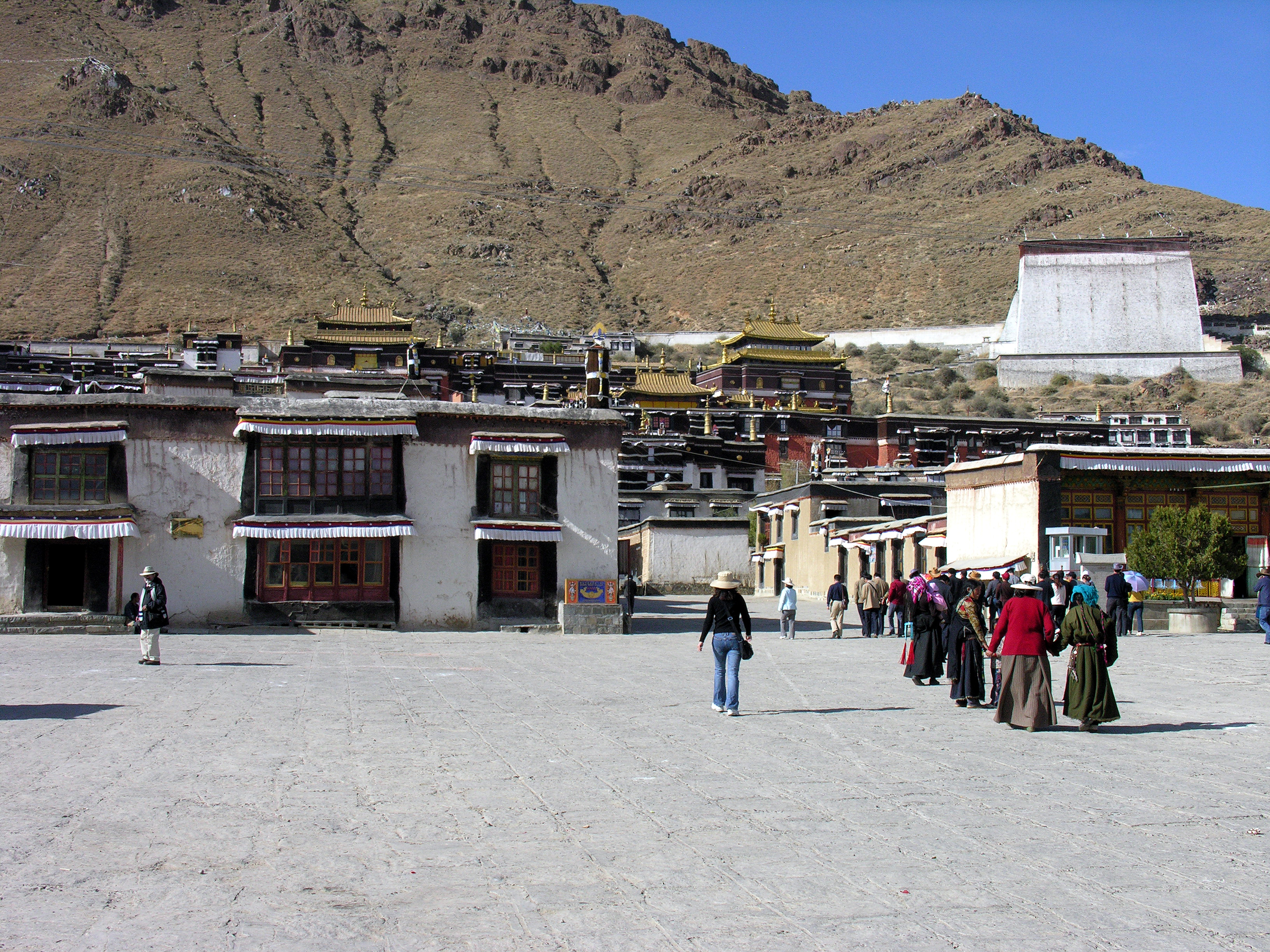
Tashilhunpo Monastery; the thangka wall seen at far right from the entrance.

The Tashilhunpo thangka wall stands on a hillside in the north-eastern part of the monastic complex. Because of its overbearing position, it can be seen from afar. It is the largest and the most impressive thangka wall still extant. It is approximately 32 metres high by 42 metres long at the base. It was built in 1468

The wall is used for displaying giant representations of Maitreya (the Buddha of the future), Amitabha (the Buddha of the infinite light), and Sakyamuni (the enlightened Buddha) on the basis of one different thangka a day during the festival taking place on the 14th, 15th and 16th of the fifth Tibetan month (i.e. 1, 2 and 3 July).

=== Riwo Dechen (Qonggyai) ===
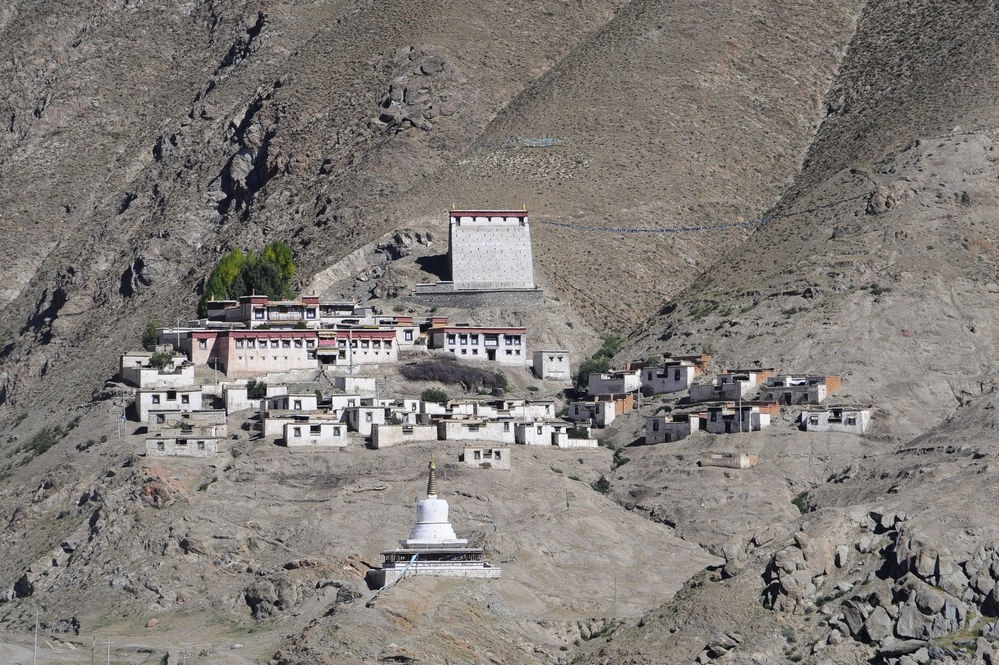
The Riwo Dechen monastery at Qonggyai with its overbearing giant thangka wall.

The Riwo Dechen kagyupa monastery in the Qonggyai Town possesses a thangka wall that overbears the other monastic buildings and can be seen from afar. It is a recently built addition to the complex. The front face of the building has a strong batter. A stone masonry retaining wall marks out the platform that extends outside the thangka wall.

A giant thangka of Maitreya, the Buddha of the future, is preserved and maintained by the monastery.

== Mounting of the thangka ==
A silk brocade is used to mount the thangka onto the wall. While mounting the thangka on the wall, it may alter some details on the iconography and overall aesthetic of the thangka. Hanging thangkas on damp thangka walls can also be detrimental to the condition of the thangka.
