= May 1911 =

Month of 1911

<<	May 1911					>>
Su	Mo	Tu	We	Th	Fr	Sa
	1	2	3	4	5	6
7	8	9	10	11	12	13
14	15	16	17	18	19	20
21	22	23	24	25	26	27
28	29	30	31

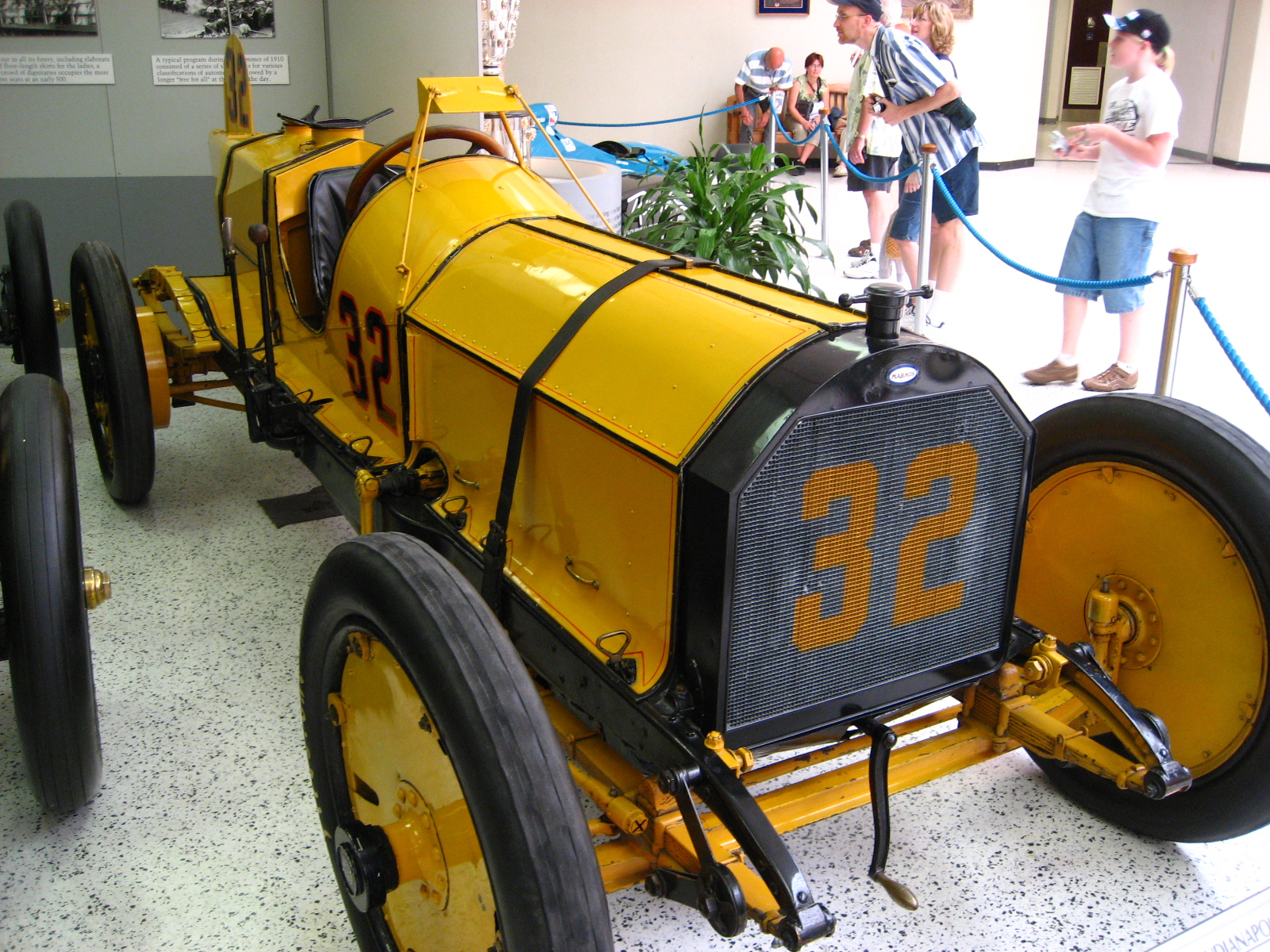
May 30, 1911: Ray Harroun's car finishes first in inaugural Indianapolis 500

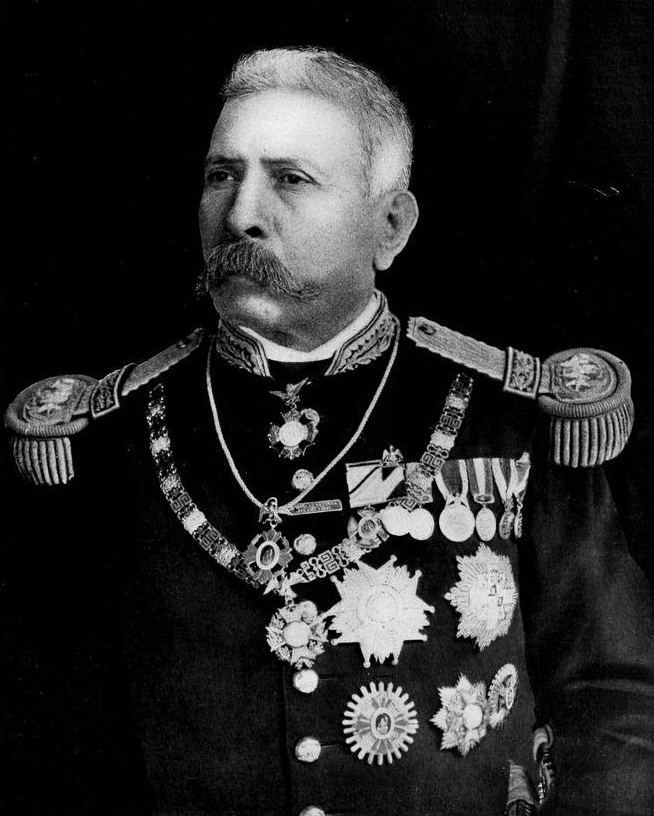
May 25, 1911: Mexico's President Diaz forced to resign as rebels win Mexican Revolution

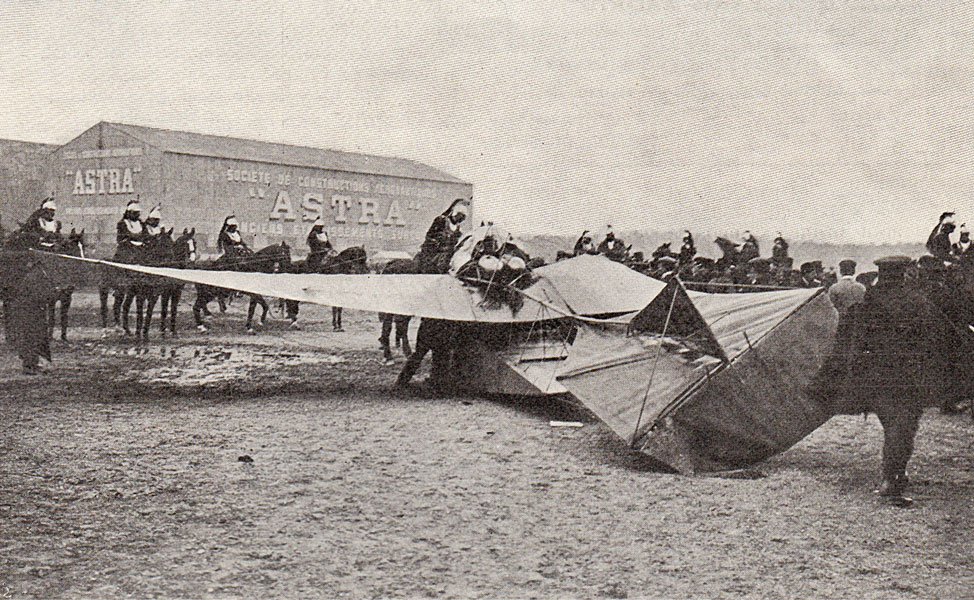
May 21, 1911: French Minister of War Berteaux killed, Prime Minister Monis injured, when airplane crashes into reviewing stand

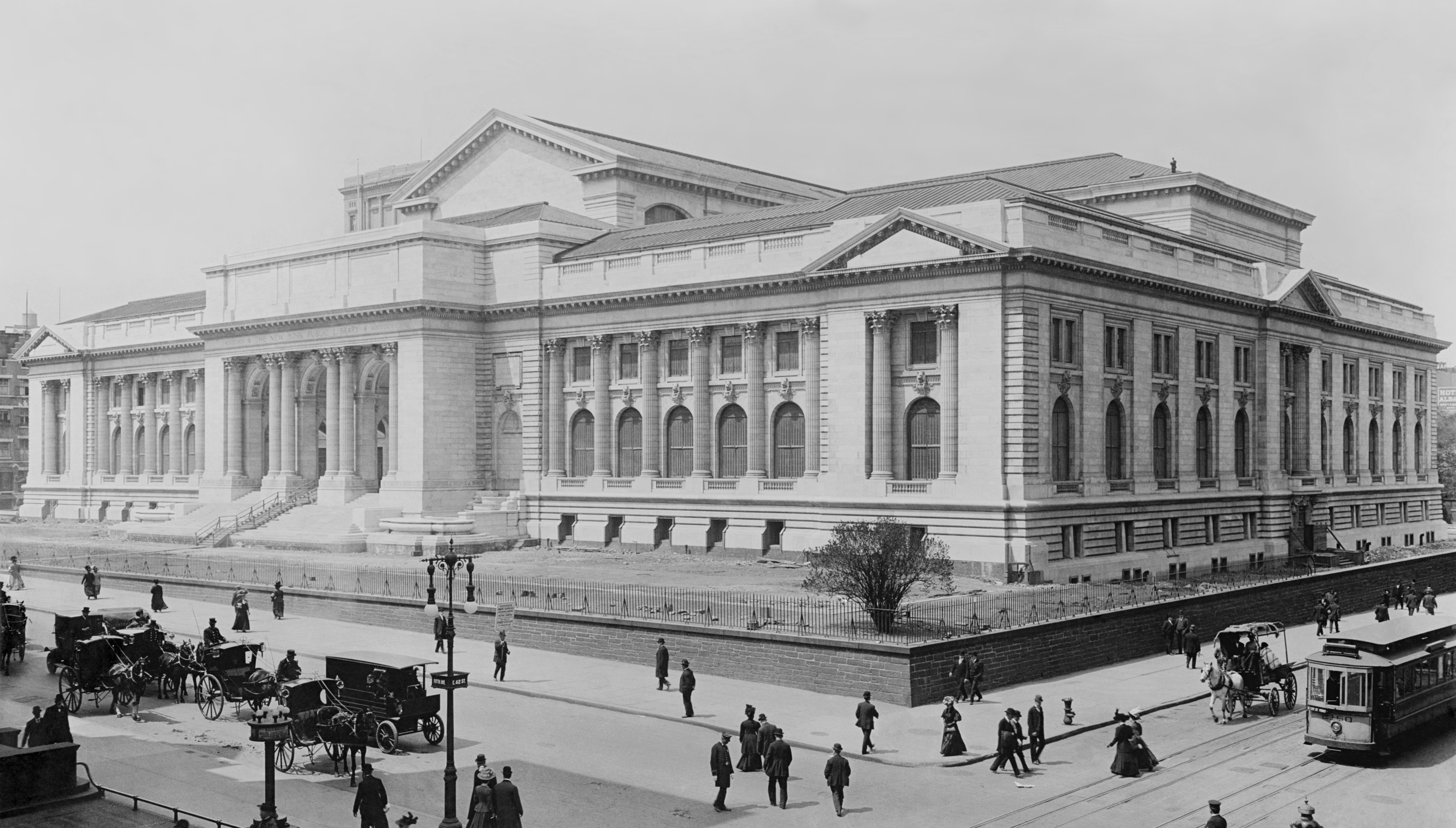
May 23, 1911: New York Public Library dedicated

The following events occurred in May 1911:

== May 1, 1911 (Monday) ==
- The United States Supreme Court ruled that the federal government, rather than the individual states, had the right to set apart lands for public use. The ruling, in Light v. United States (220 U.S. 523) initially applied to forest preserves, but would be extended to other federal use of land.

== May 2, 1911 (Tuesday) ==
- The British House of Commons approved amendments to the Parliament Bill, a provision for veto of House of Lords power, with the first reading passing 299 to 193.
- Professor Horatio W. Parker of Yale University, and former Yale professor Brian Hooker won the $10,000 prize from New York's Metropolitan Opera for an opera written and composed entirely by Americans, with Mona receiving the grand prize.

== May 3, 1911 (Wednesday) ==
- The German Antarctic Expedition, organized by Wilhelm Filchner, departed from Bremerhaven on the ship Deutschland. Sailing into the Weddell Sea and getting trapped by the ice there for eight months, the expedition would discover the Filchner Ice Shelf.

== May 4, 1911 (Thursday) ==
- The British National Insurance Bill, providing for both health insurance and unemployment insurance, was introduced by Chancellor of the Exchequer David Lloyd George. With workers paying 4d, employers 3d and the government 2d per worker per week, the system became operational on January 15, 1913, and provided sickness payments of up to 10 shillings per week during illness.

== May 5, 1911 (Friday) ==
- Sir George Kemp's suffrage bill passed its second reading, 255–88. The right to vote was proposed for every woman "possessed of the household qualification," excluding women servants and lodgers, and prohibited women from voting in the same constituency as their husbands.
- A report on the Haram al-Sharif incident was published, in which it revealed British excavations within the sacred compound.
- Born: Andor Lilienthal, Hungarian and Soviet chess grandmaster; in Moscow (d. 2010).

== May 6, 1911 (Saturday) ==
- The first International Hygiene Exhibition opened in Dresden, and attracted five million visitors to the German city.
- The Colorado Senate adjourned after seven ballots with no replacement for the late Senator Charles J. Hughes Jr., who had died on January 11. Colorado had only one U.S. Senator for more than two years, until Charles S. Thomas took office on January 20, 1913.
- Died: George Maledon, 80, nicknamed "The Prince of Hangmen", for carrying out most of the 79 executions at Fort Smith, Arkansas, as ordered by "The Hanging Judge", Isaac C. Parker.

== May 7, 1911 (Sunday) ==
- Porfirio Díaz issued a "manifesto" declaring that he would eventually resign as President of Mexico, but not until hostilities by Francisco I. Madero's rebel armies ceased, declaring that he would step down "when, according to the dictates of my conscience, I am sure my resignation will not be followed by anarchy."
- Born: Ishirō Honda, Japanese film director, in Yamagata Prefecture (d. 1993).

== May 8, 1911 (Monday) ==
- In what has been described as the birth of naval aviation, Captain Washington Irving Chambers of the United States Navy awarded a contract to Curtiss Aeroplane and Motor Company for the Curtiss A-1 Triad.
- The Chinese Grand Council was abolished, replaced by ten member constitutional cabinet, with Yikuang (Prince Qing) becoming the first Premier in China's history.
- China and the United Kingdom signed an agreement whereby the Chinese would phase out production of opium over a 7-year period, and the British would phase out exports of opium from India to China at the same rate.
- The House of Lords approved Lord Lansdowne's proposal for reconstitution of the House of Lords on its first reading.
- Germany issued a warning to France that an attempted occupation of the Moroccan city of Fes would be considered a violation of a treaty between the two nations.
- Born:
  - Robert Johnson, American blues musician, and one of the original inductees of the Rock and Roll Hall of Fame; ranked by Rolling Stone magazine in 2008 as fifth greatest guitarist of all time; in Hazlehurst, Mississippi (poisoned 1938).
  - Rudolf Flesch, American educator whose 1955 book Why Johnny Can't Read successfully advocated a change from sight-word reading back to phonics; in Vienna, Austria (d. 1986).

== May 9, 1911 (Tuesday) ==
- The American Psychoanalytic Association was founded, at an organizational meeting in Baltimore.
- A fire broke out at the Empire Palace Theatre in Edinburgh, Scotland, during a performance of the variety and magic show of Sigmund Neuberger, who billed himself as "The Great Lafayette." The audience of 1,500 was evacuated in four minutes, but eleven members of the troupe, including Lafayette himself, died in the blaze.
- Professor Boris Rosing of the Saint Petersburg State Institute of Technology, assisted by his student Vladimir Zworykin, demonstrated the transmission of a scanned image-- "four luminous bands" on to a cathode ray tube. Zworykin would build upon Rosing's discoveries in the development of television.
- Johann Orth, formerly known as Archduke John Salvator of Austria, was declared legally dead 20 years after he had disappeared.
- The body of Elsie Paroubek, the subject of an exhaustive three-state manhunt by Chicago police over the four weeks since her disappearance in April, was found in a Lockport, Illinois drainage canal. Her photograph was published on the front page of the Chicago Daily News and would become an inspiration to amateur artist-author Henry Darger, who would make her a central figure in his immense fantasy novel The Story of the Vivian Girls.
- Died: Thomas Wentworth Higginson, 87, American minister and abolitionist who had commanded the 1st South Carolina Colored Infantry Regiment, a Union army regiment composed of African-American soldiers, during the Civil War.

== May 10, 1911 (Wednesday) ==
- At 2:30 pm, General Juan Navarro surrendered the city of Ciudad Juárez to the rebel forces of Pascual Orozco and Pancho Villa, who had attacked the city in defiance of Francisco Madero. The fall of Juarez was the first loss of territory to the rebels. Madero proclaimed himself President the next day.
- Born:
  - Bel Kaufman, German-born American author (Up the Down Staircase), in Berlin (d. 2014).
  - Alexander D. Goode, U.S. Army Chaplain who was one of the Four Chaplains to give up their lives as the USAT Dorchester sank on February 3, 1943; in Columbus, Ohio.

== May 11, 1911 (Thursday) ==
- The United States Senate failed, after seven ballots, to elect a replacement for the office of president pro tempore, two weeks after the death of Senator William P. Frye of Maine. Senator Jacob H. Gallinger of New Hampshire failed to win majority support. The deadlock was broken by an agreement to rotate the position among five different U.S. Senators until the 62nd U.S. Congress session ended in 1913.
- Born:
  - Phil Silvers, American TV actor and comedian, as Philip Silver in Brooklyn (d. 1985).
  - Doodles Weaver (Winstead Dixon Weaver), American TV actor and comedian, in Los Angeles (d. 1983).
  - Jeanne Behrend, American composer, in Philadelphia (d. 1988).

== May 12, 1911 (Friday) ==
- The American steamship SS Merida sank after it was struck by another vessel, the Admiral Farragut off of the coast of Cape Charles in the U.S. state of Virginia. Although the 131-member crew and the 188 passengers were all rescued, SS Merida sank with a cargo that included 372 silver bars and a cargo worth two million dollars at the time, equivalent to $65 million more than 110 years later. Subsequent attempts to salvage the cargo would recover very little.

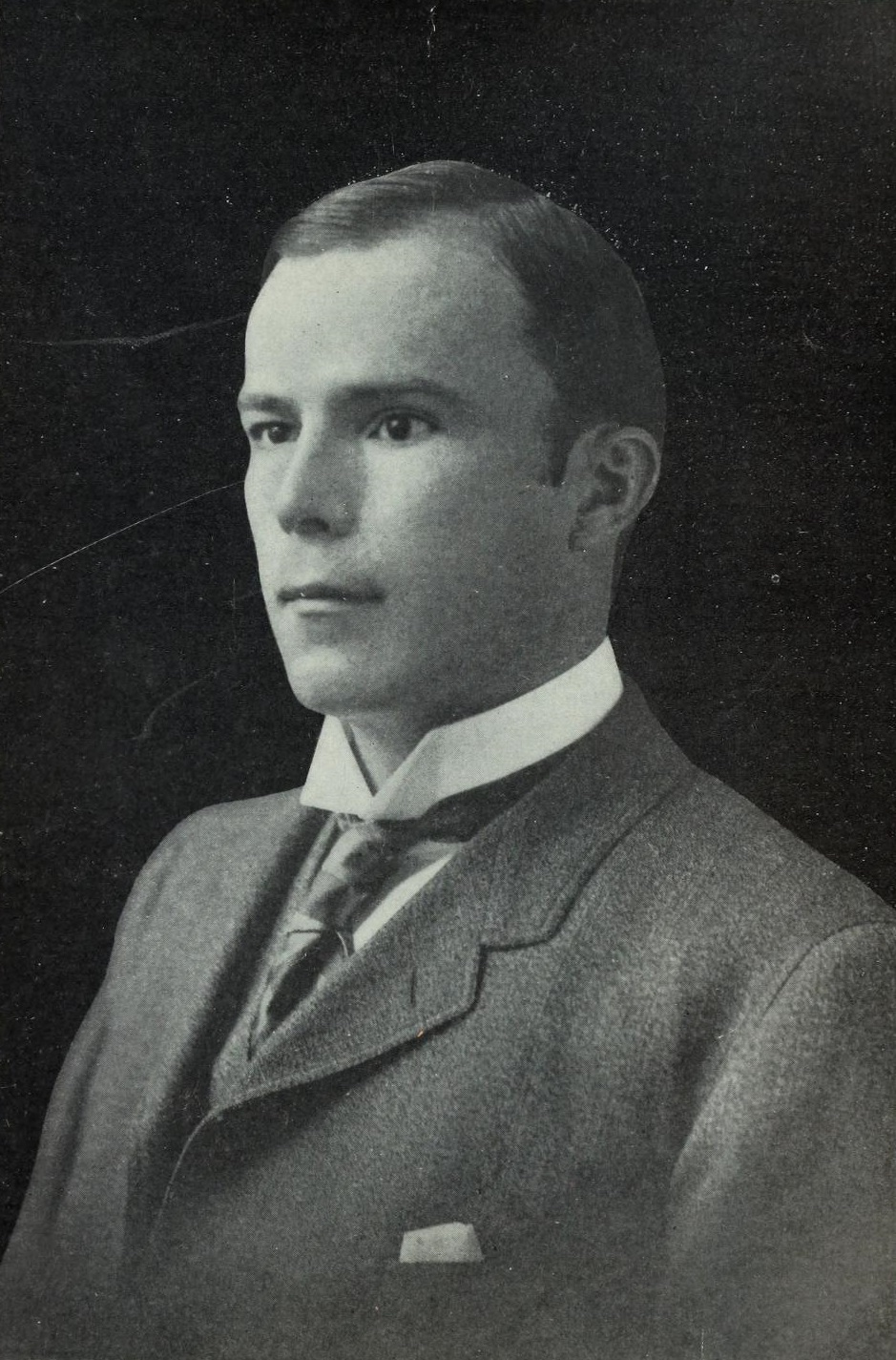
Iranian treasurer Bill Shuster

- At the request of the parliament of Persia, William Morgan Shuster, a 34-year-old American lawyer, arrived in what is now Iran to manage the nation's economy as its Treasurer General. Shuster was forced to leave eight months later after the Russian Empire sent troops to prevent him from seizing the assets of the former royal family.

== May 13, 1911 (Saturday) ==
- An Imperial Decree was issued in China, annexing the railroad lines from Hankou to Guangzhou and Chongqing, in advance of the receipt of the first installment of a loan from foreign banks to construct a new railroad.
- Born:
  - Wayne Hays, U.S. Representative from Ohio (1949–76) and onetime chairman of the House Administration Committee until scandal forced his resignation; in Bannock, Ohio (d. 1989).
  - Maxine Sullivan, American blues singer, in Homestead, Pennsylvania (d. 1987).

== May 14, 1911 (Sunday) ==
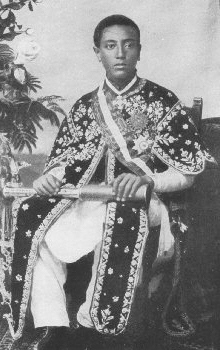
Emperor Iyasu V of Abyssinia

- Prince Lij Iyasu was proclaimed as Emperor Iyasu V of Ethiopia, referred to at the time as Abyssinia.

== May 15, 1911 (Monday) ==
- The United States Supreme Court issued its ruling in Standard Oil Co. of New Jersey v. United States, upholding a judgment that the Standard Oil Company held a monopoly in violation of American antitrust law, and ordered that the Standard Oil be split into competing companies within six months. Among the 38 companies created were Standard Oil of New Jersey (later Exxon) and Standard Oil of New York (Mobil), which merged in 1999 as ExxonMobil; Standard Oil of Indiana (Amoco), Standard Oil of California (Chevron), Atlantic Refining (ARCO) and Continental Oil Company (Conoco).
- The Parliament Act 1911, nicknamed the "Veto Bill" because it gave the right of the lower house of Parliament to reverse decisions by the House of Lords, passed the British House of Commons on its third reading, 362–241, and moved on to the House of Lords.
- Born: Max Frisch, Swiss author, in Zürich (d. 1991).
- Died: James Smith, 53, Chairman of Manufacturing Committee of Standard Oil Company.

== May 16, 1911 (Tuesday) ==
- A group of 303 Chinese and five Japanese immigrants were killed in the Torreón massacre when the forces of the Mexican Revolution, led by Francisco I. Madero's brother Emilio Madero, took the city of Torreón from the Federales. After a three-day defense, government troops departed and twelve hours of rioting began. Among the victims was Dr. J.W. Lim, a wealthy Chinese-Mexican banker, who was dragged through the streets before being shot. In all, 316 Chinese residents were murdered during the revolution, and China's ambassador to Mexico, Shung As Sune, demanded compensation from the Mexican government of 33,600,000 pesos, worth $16,800,000 for the loss of lives and property.
- Henry Lewis Stimson was confirmed by the U.S. Senate as the new U.S. Secretary of War, four days after the resignation of Jacob M. Dickinson.
- Died: Margaret A. Weller, 68, the first person to learn how to use the QWERTY keyboard. Mrs. Weller, the wife of a court reporter, tested the prototype of the typewriter invented by C. Latham Sholes in 1867.

== May 17, 1911 (Wednesday) ==
- Born:
  - Maureen O'Sullivan, Irish-born American film actress, in Boyle, County Roscommon, Ireland (d. 1998).
  - Clark Kerr, American educator, in Stony Creek, Pennsylvania (d. 2003).
  - Lisa Fonssagrives, Swedish fashion model, described in the New York Times in 1997 as "The First Supermodel," in Västra Götaland County (d. 1992).
- Died:
  - William Benjamin Baker, 70, former U.S. Congressman of South Dakota and "father of rural free delivery."
  - Constance Faunt Le Roy Runcie, 75, American musical composer.

== May 18, 1911 (Thursday) ==
- The Illinois State Senate voted to reopen the investigation into the controversial election of U.S. Senator William Lorimer, a day after the committee concluded that he would not have been elected without bribery.
- Born: Big Joe Turner, American blues singer whose song "Shake, Rattle and Roll" made him a rock star in his 40s; inducted posthumously into the Rock and Roll Hall of Fame in 1987; in Kansas City, Missouri (d. 1985).
- Died: Gustav Mahler, 50, Austrian composer.

== May 19, 1911 (Friday) ==
- Parks Canada, the governmental agency which regulates national parks in the Dominion of Canada, was created as the Dominion Parks Branch of the Canadian Department of the Interior, and was the first National Park Service in any nation.
- Carlo Crispi of New York became the first American to be convicted of a crime as a result of fingerprint evidence alone. Crispi, whose prints had been taken during a burglary a few years earlier, was caught after his fingerprints had been found on a pane of glass at the scene of another break in. After hearing expert testimony, Crispi pleaded guilty to burglary in return for a light sentence of 6 months and in the interests of science.

== May 20, 1911 (Saturday) ==
- The Hukuang Loan Agreement, which would prove to be the downfall of the Manchu Dynasty and the Chinese Empire, was signed in Beijing, providing for a $30,000,000 loan to the Imperial Government.
- Born:
  - Gardner Fox, American comic book writer for DC Comics, who helped create the "Justice Society of America" and later the "Justice League of America" series; in Brooklyn (d. 1986).
  - Milt Gabler, American record producer who introduced multiple innovations in the recording industry; in Harlem; inducted into the Rock and Roll Hall of Fame (d. 2001).
- Died: Williamina Fleming, 54, Scottish astronomer who perfected the Pickering-Fleming system for classification of variable stars.

== May 21, 1911 (Sunday) ==
- The Treaty of Ciudad Juárez was signed, formally ending the Mexican Revolution. The treaty was to have been signed at the customs office at Juarez, which was on the Mexican–American border and had served as the headquarters for rebel leader Francisco I. Madero, but, as The New York Times reported later, "By some mistake, as yet unexplaned, the Custom House was locked when the Police Commissioners arrived." Judge Francisco S. Carbajal, appearing as representative for Mexico's President Porfirio Díaz, and Madero and two other insurgent leaders, decided to sign the treaty on the steps of the customs building, under the illumination of automobile headlights.

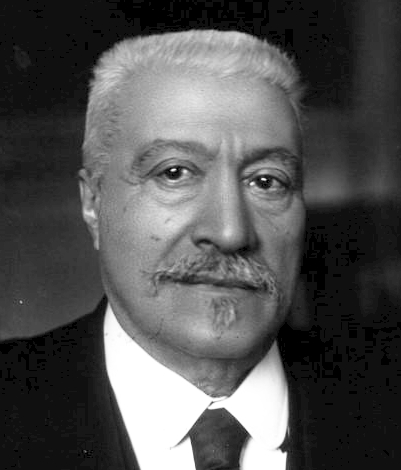
Prime Minister Monis

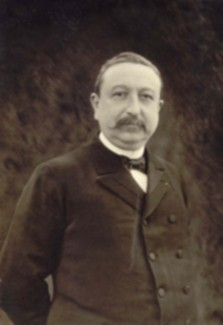
War Minister Berteaux

- French Minister of War Henri Berteaux was killed, and Prime Minister Ernest Monis was seriously injured, after they were struck by an airplane at Issy-les-Moulineaux. The occasion was the start of the 1911 Paris to Madrid air race, with 200,000 spectators turning out to watch. Piloted by a Messieur Train, the monoplane took off without clearance, was caught in a downdraft and plunged into the assembled dignitaries. Berteaux was struck by the propeller which severed his left arm, fractured his skull and cut his throat, and Monis sustained compound fractures of his right leg and a broken nose.
- Born: Peter Hurkos, Dutch-born housepainter who claimed to have obtained psychic powers after falling from a roof in 1941; in Dordrecht (d. 1988).

== May 22, 1911 (Monday) ==
- A monument was unveiled at Arlington, Virginia, to Pierre L'Enfant, with U.S. President Taft and French Ambassador Jusserand speaking in honor of the Frenchman who had designed the city of Washington, D.C. Said Taft, "There are not many who have to wait 100 years to receive the reward to which they are entitled, until the world shall make the progress which enables it to pay the just reward."
- Born: Anatol Rapoport, Russian-born American mathematician and pioneer in mathematical biology; in Lozovaya, Russia (d. 2007).

== May 23, 1911 (Tuesday) ==
- The New York Public Library was dedicated by President Taft and by the library's greatest benefactor, Andrew Carnegie . It opened the next day at 9:00 to the general public.
- Pinellas County, Florida was established.

== May 24, 1911 (Wednesday) ==
- At a speech in Kansas City, Missouri, U.S. Secretary of the Treasury Franklin MacVeagh endorsed the plan of the National Monetary Commission to create the Federal Reserve Board.
- Born:
  - Ne Win, Prime Minister and then President of Burma from 1958 to 1981, and chairman of the nation's sole political party until his 1988 ouster, in Paungdale (d. 2002).
  - Carleen Hutchins, American violin maker, in Springfield, Massachusetts (d. 2009).
  - Barbara West, one of the last two survivors of the 1912 sinking of the Titanic, in Bournemouth, England (d. 2007).

== May 25, 1911 (Thursday) ==
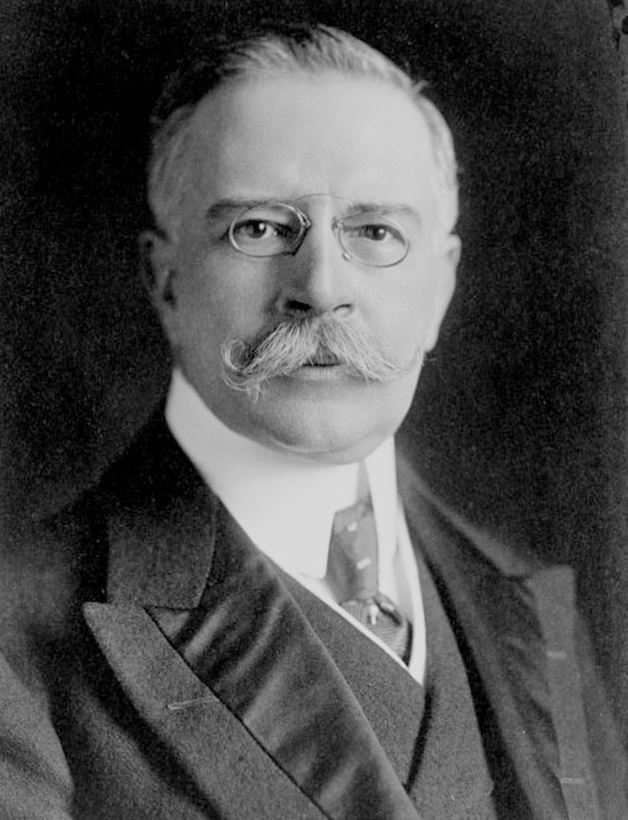
President Leon

- Mexico's President Porfirio Díaz and Vice-president Ramón Corral presented their resignations to the Chamber of Deputies in Mexico City at 4:25 pm. At 4:54, the Chamber voted 167–0 to accept. Foreign Minister Francisco León de la Barra was then sworn in as Provisional President of Mexico.
- Racial riots between Hindus and Muslims in the city of Khulna in India's Bengal Province (now Bangladesh) were suppressed.
- Born: William Roos, American novelist, playwright, and screenwriter (d. 1987).

== May 26, 1911 (Friday) ==
- Igor Stravinsky completed his composition of the music for the ballet Petrushka, just 18 days before its world premiere.
- Born: Ben Alexander, American actor, in Goldfield, Nevada (d. 1969).

== May 27, 1911 (Saturday) ==
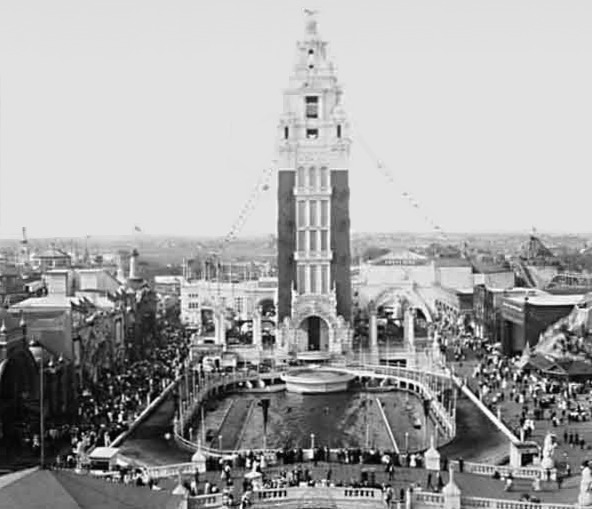
Dreamland Park

- The Dreamland amusement park at New York's Coney Island was destroyed by a fire that began after workmen had been repairing a ride called the Hell Gate. The park had been built only 7 years earlier by William H. Reynolds for $3.5 million (equivalent to $70,000,000 a century later), included a 70-foot-tall tower, and employed 2,500 people. It was never rebuilt.
- Born:
  - Hubert H. Humphrey, U.S. Vice President (1965–69), U.S. Senator for Minnesota, and unsuccessful candidate for U.S. president in 1968, in Wallace, South Dakota (d. 1978).
  - Vincent Price, American horror-film actor, in St. Louis (d. 1993).
  - Teddy Kollek, Mayor of Jerusalem from 1965 to 1993; as Kollek Tivadar in Nagyvázsony, Austria-Hungary (d. 2007).

== May 28, 1911 (Sunday) ==
- The body of Belle Walker, an African-American cook, was found 25 yards from her home on Garibaldi Street in Atlanta. Her throat had been cut by an unknown slayer, and the crime was reported in the Atlanta Constitution under the headline "Negro Woman Killed; No Clew to Slayer" On June 15, another black woman, Addie Watts, was found with her throat slashed, followed on June 27 by Lizzie Watkins. The search for the serial killer, called "the Atlanta Ripper" by the press, found six different suspects, but no convictions were ever made, nor was the crime ever solved. By the end of 1911, fifteen women, all black or dark-skinned, all in their early 20s, had been murdered in the same manner. The "Ripper" may have had as many as 21 victims.
- The United States Post Office Department announced a surplus for the first time in its history. Postmaster General Frank H. Hitchcock returned $3,000,000 to the U.S. Treasury, declaring it necessary because of a surplus "considerably over $1,000,000".
- Born:
  - Fritz Hochwälder, Austrian playwright, in Vienna, Austria-Hungary (d. 1986).
  - Dame Thora Hird, British actress in Morecambe, Lancashire, England (d. 2003).

== May 29, 1911 (Monday) ==
- The United States Supreme Court followed its breakup of the Standard Oil Company with a decision dissolving the American Tobacco Company.
- Crowley County, Colorado, was established from the northern portion of Otero County.
- Died: W. S. Gilbert, 74, British playwright and lyricist (to the music of Arthur Sullivan in the famous partnership of Gilbert and Sullivan), suffered a fatal heart attack and drowned while swimming to the rescue of 17-year-old Ruby Preece on the lake of his estate. Preece got out of the lake on her own afterward.

== May 30, 1911 (Tuesday) ==
- Ray Harroun won the very first running of the Indianapolis 500 automobile race, driving car #32, a Marmon Wasp. At an average speed of 74.59 miles per hour, Harroun, who was the only driver not to have a mechanic riding with him, completed the race in 6 hours and 42 minutes. The race was marred by the death of Sam Dickson, who became the first person killed during the Indianapolis 500. At the time, the cars carried both a driver and a riding mechanic, and Dickson was the mechanic for driver Arthur Greiner. On lap 12, one of the front wheels on the Greiner-Dickson car came off, and both men to be thrown from the car. Dickson was thrown into a fence 20 feet (6.1 m) away and killed instantly, while Greiner had a broken arm.

== May 31, 1911 (Wednesday) ==
- The terrorist bombing of the barracks at Fort La Loma in Nicaragua killed 130 people.
- Shortly after the thoroughbred horse Sunstar won the 132nd running of Britain's premiere horse race, the Epsom Derby, a powerful thunderstorm struck the area in and around Epsom. Seventeen people were killed by lightning strikes, and more were injured, during the evening. A downpour soaked most of the 100,000 spectators, though none were killed.

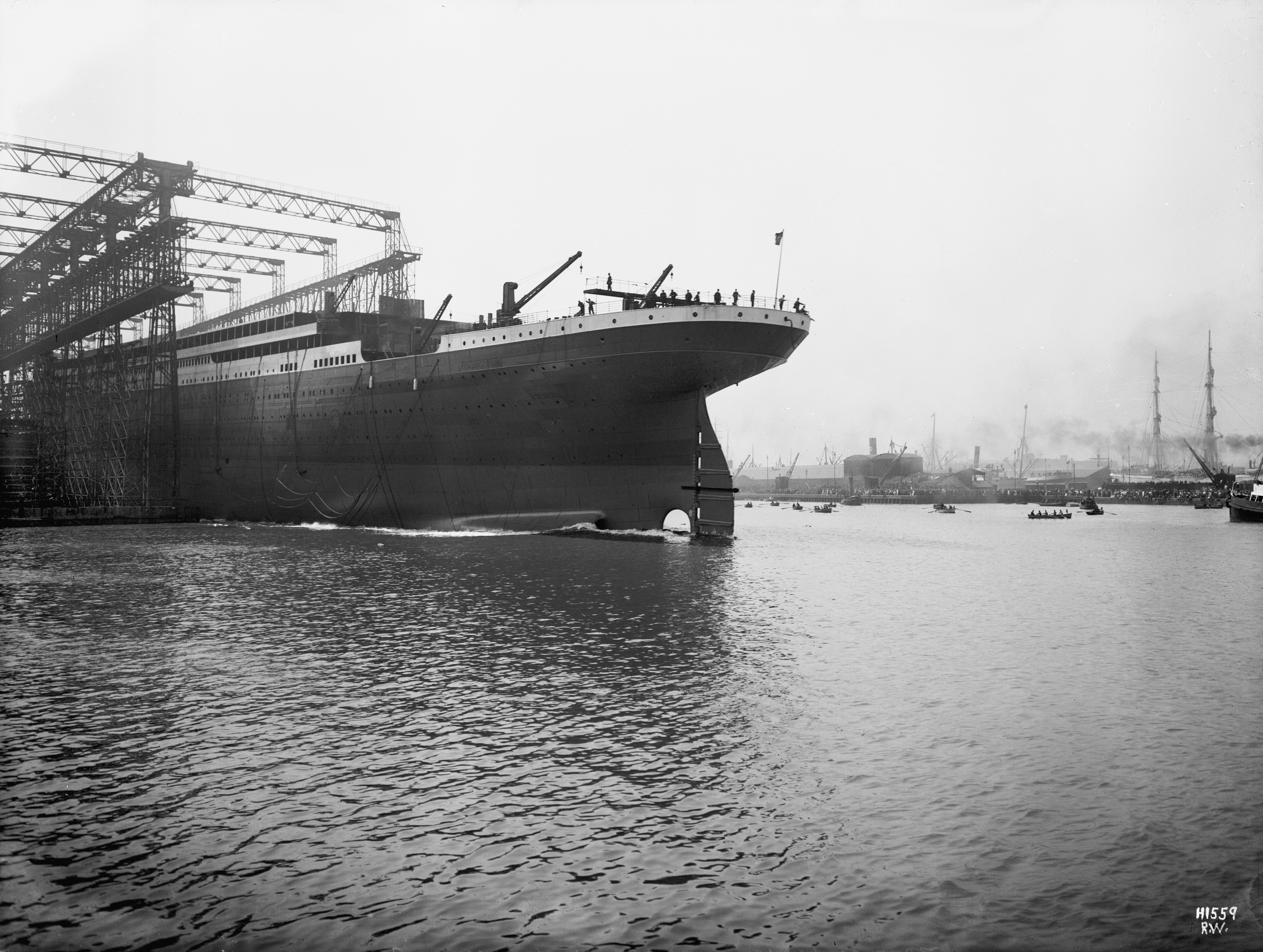
The newly built megaship RMS Titanic

- The White Star liner RMS Titanic, at the time the largest mobile object ever constructed, was launched from Belfast at 12:13 pm. It was 883 feet long, 58 feet high and weighed 46,000 tons. It would sink less than a year later.
- Porfirio Díaz left Mexico to begin his exile in France, departing from Veracruz on the steamer Ypiranga. Before departing, he declared, "I shall die in Mexico." He would die in exile in France in 1915.
- Born: Maurice Allais, French economist, 1988 Nobel Prize in Economics laureate, in Paris (d. 2010).
