= June 1911 =

Month of 1911

<<	June 1911					>>
Su	Mo	Tu	We	Th	Fr	Sa
				1	2	3
4	5	6	7	8	9	10
11	12	13	14	15	16	17
18	19	20	21	22	23	24
25	26	27	28	29	30

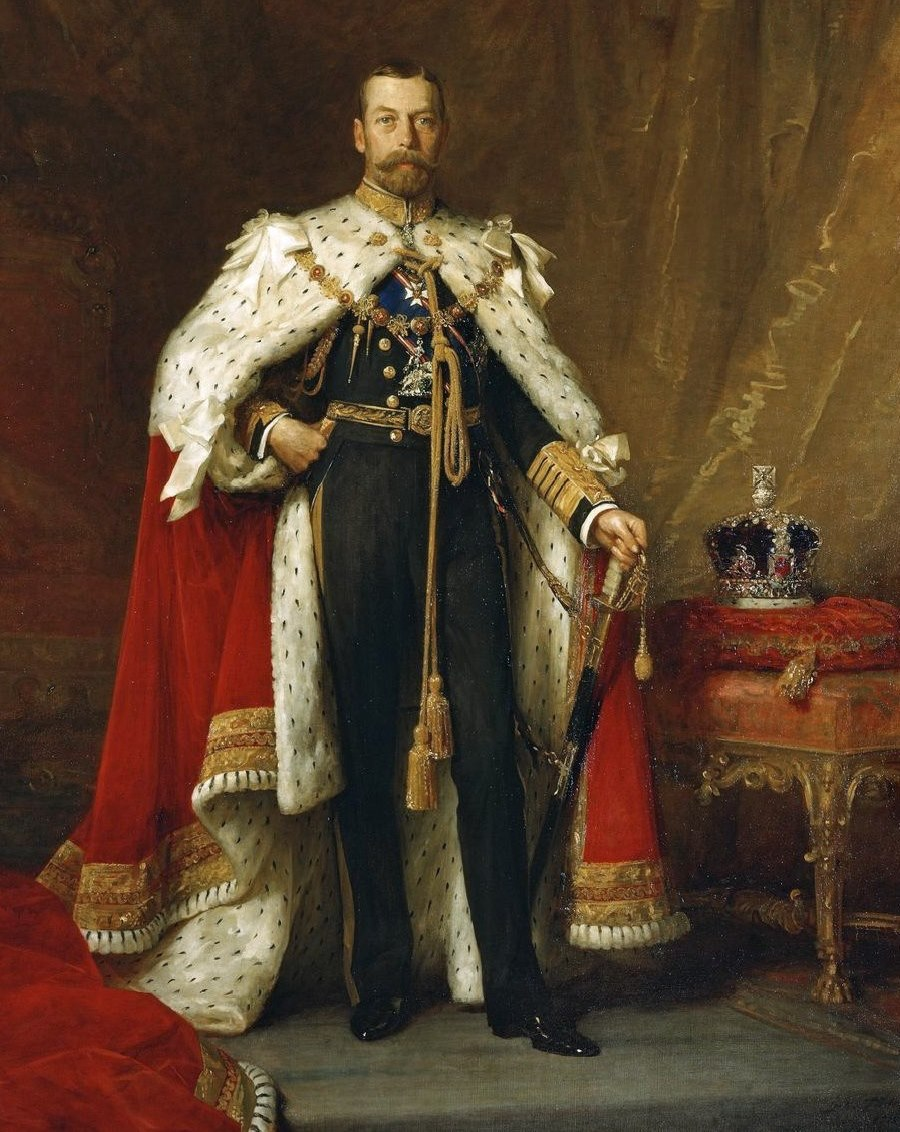
June 22, 1911: George V crowned King at Westminster Abbey

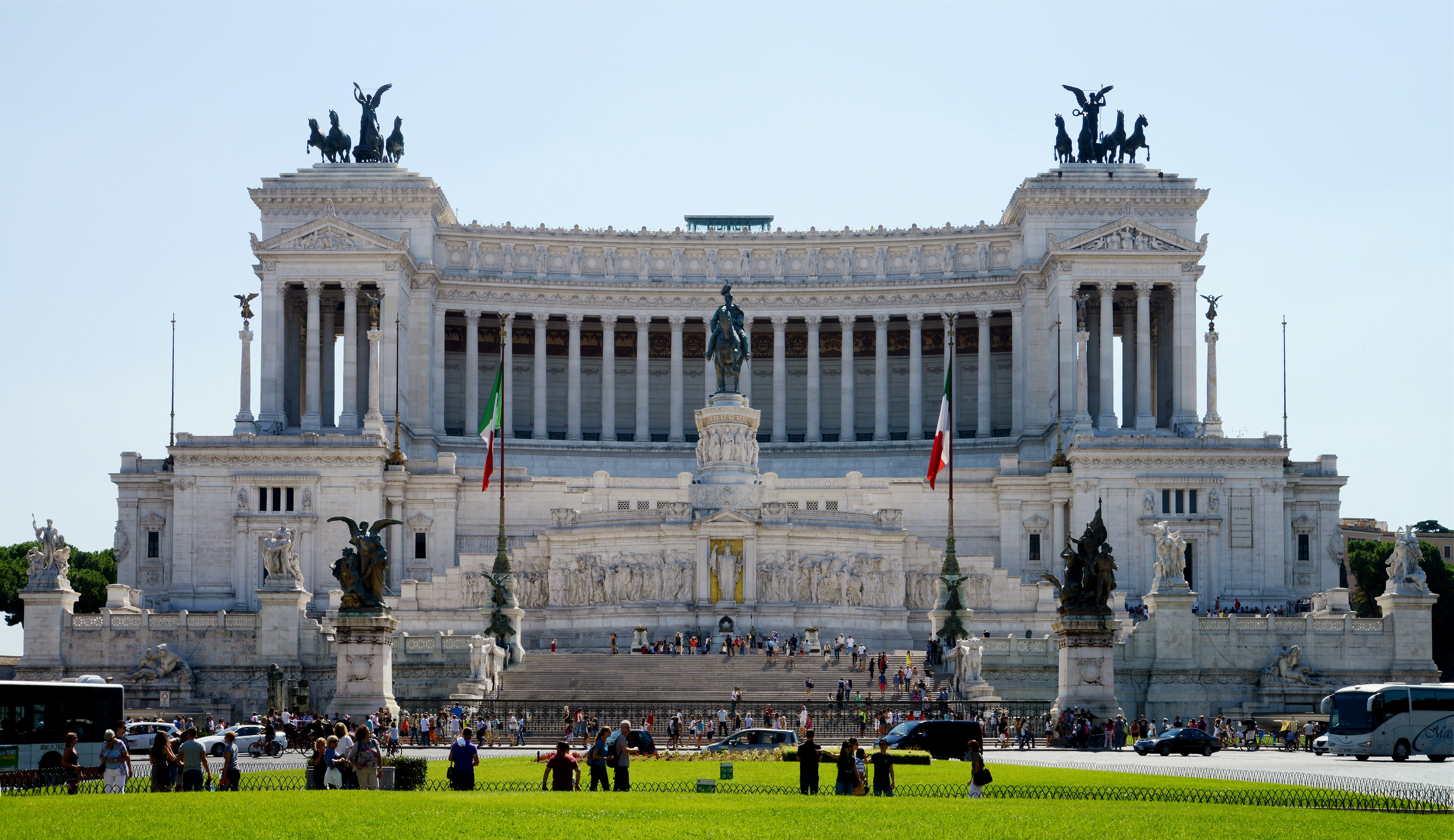
June 4, 1911: Il Vittoriano dedicated in Italy

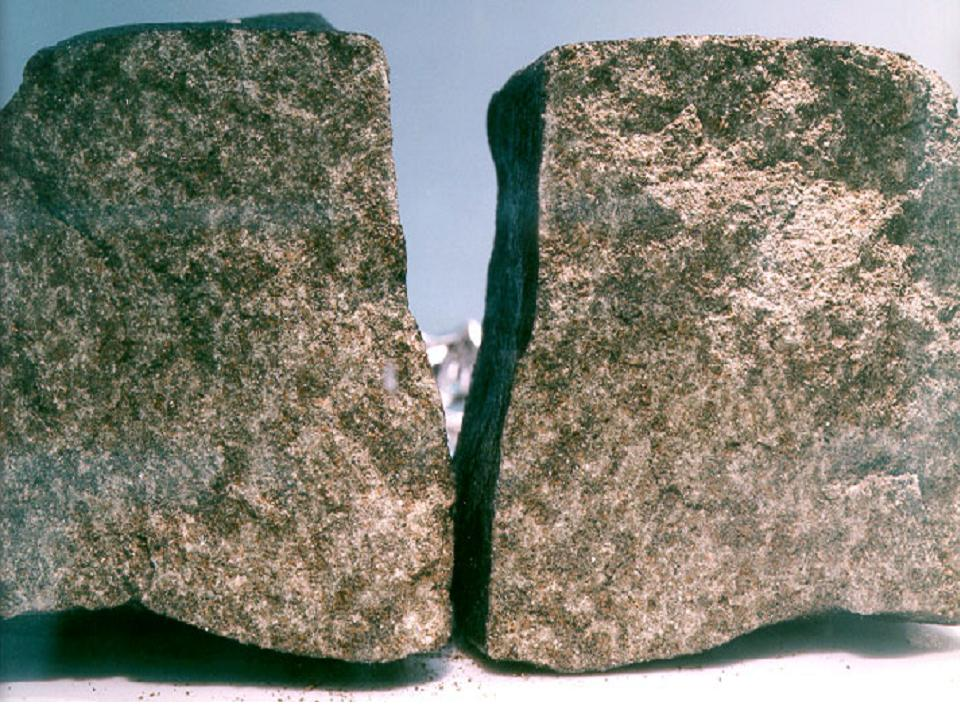
June 28, 1911: A piece of Mars falls on Egypt

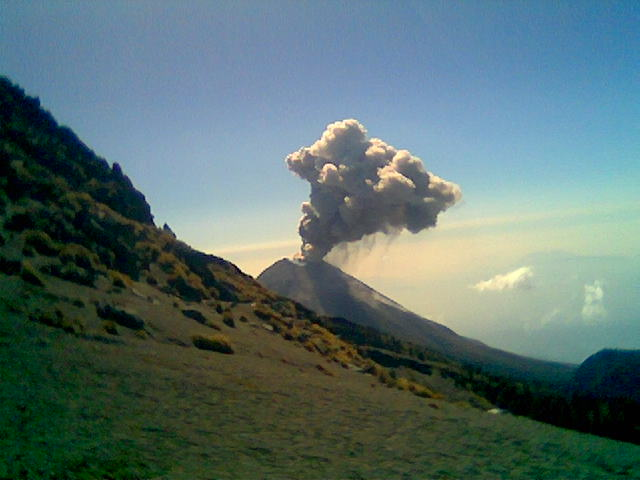
June 6, 1911: Colima Volcano erupts in Mexico

The following events occurred in June 1911:

== June 1, 1911 (Thursday) ==
- The Senate voted 48–20 to reopen the investigation of U.S. Senator William Lorimer of Illinois, after voting against his expulsion on March 1.
- Chiang Kai-shek first reached national prominence when he delivered a stirring public lecture advocating a socialist government for China, which he would eventually govern.

== June 2, 1911 (Friday) ==
- The city of Fort Lauderdale, Florida, was incorporated.
- Francisco I. Madero departed from El Paso, Texas on a Southern Pacific train at 1:30 am to make his journey back to Mexico City, to meet with interim President de la Barra. He stopped first at Spofford Junction, Texas, where he then crossed the border to board another train on June 2.
- Born: Hsiao Hung, Chinese female novelist; in Hulan, Heilongjiang province (d. 1942).
- Died:
  - Axel Olof Freudenthal, 74, Swedish philologist and politician.
  - Jose Domingo Brindis, 59, black violinist.

== June 3, 1911 (Saturday) ==
- L. Frank Baum filed for bankruptcy in U.S. District Court in Los Angeles after having incurred $12,600 in debts. He died in 1919 and never saw any more royalties from The Wizard of Oz, the publishing rights to which would remain with a trustee until 1932.
- Born:
  - Ellen Corby, American actress and winner of three Emmy awards for her portrayal of the grandmother on The Waltons; in Racine, Wisconsin (d. 1999).
  - Paulette Goddard, American film actress; as Pauline Levy; in Queens, New York (d. 1990).
- Died: Edward Der-Pault, who had overcome the handicap of losing both legs and became a high diver at amusement parks, was killed in Bayonne, New Jersey before a crowd of several hundred people. Jumping from a 50-foot (15 m) high ladder into a 6-foot (1.8 m) tank of water, Der-Pault had miscalculated the distance and struck the edge of the tank.

== June 4, 1911 (Sunday) ==
- On the 50th anniversary of the unification of Italy, a crowd of one million people turned out in Rome to watch the unveiling of the Altare della Patria, a 250-foot-high monument in honor of King Victor Emmanuel II.
- Born: Billy Fiske, American athlete who won gold medals in bobsledding in 1928 and 1932; in Brooklyn (killed in battle, 1940).
- Died: Colonel T.M. Locke, 87, who had led the secession of Texas in 1861.

== June 5, 1911 (Monday) ==
- Sultan Mehmed V of the Ottoman Empire began his journey to "Rumeli," the Turkish name for the Empire's European provinces in the Balkans.

== June 6, 1911 (Tuesday) ==
- Tazzia, the Moorish pretender to the throne of Morocco, was defeated at Alcazarquivir. Spanish troops landed at Larache two days later.
- A volcano in the Mexican state of Colima had its most violent eruption since 1869, which preceded a deadly earthquake in the region by 24 hours.
- Died: Edward Harrigan, 65, American comedian.

== June 7, 1911 (Wednesday) ==
- An earthquake in Mexico killed more than 1,200 people. In Zapotlán, 500 people were killed. The first shock was felt at 4:36 am and lasted for more than a minute. Francisco I. Madero made a triumphant entry into Mexico City on the same day.
- Died: Maurice Rouvier, 69, former Premier of France (1887, 1905–1906).

== June 8, 1911 (Thursday) ==
- The U.S. State Department gave permission for at least 1,500 Mexican soldiers to cross into the United States so that a rebellion in Baja California could be suppressed. The troops would be disarmed as soon as they crossed into Arizona, and their weapons and ammunition would be returned to them after they crossed from California back into Mexico.
- Frans Schollaert, the Prime Minister of Belgium, resigned after the defeat of his proposed education bill.
- Hiram Bingham III departed for Peru on the SS Marta to search for Vilcabamba.

== June 9, 1911 (Friday) ==
- Former Congressman Charles D. Haines of New York founded the "Guardians of Liberty," an anti-Catholic and anti-Black organization that declared itself to be a "non-religious, non-partisan, non-racial moral force to promote patriotism and a sacred regard for the welfare of our country."
- Died: Carrie Nation, 64, American temperance activist.

== June 10, 1911 (Saturday) ==
- The German battleship SMS Friedrich der Grosse was launched from Hamburg.
- The American battleship fleet arrived at Kronstadt in Russia. (June 11)
- At Rouen, France, the 1,000th anniversary of the arrival of the Normans was observed. The Kensington Runestone, purporting to be a record of the arrival of Norsemen in Minnesota in 1362, was loaned for the celebration by the Minnesota Historical Society.

== June 11, 1911 (Sunday) ==
- For the first time, the U.S. Senate approved an amendment to the U.S. Constitution to have its members elected directly by the people, rather than by state legislatures. The 64-24 approval of the proposed Seventeenth Amendment, which changed the requirement of Article I, Section 3, was on an altered version of what had passed the House of Representatives. Voting on the "Bristow Amendment" (proposed by Joseph L. Bristow of Kansas), which added the language that "Congress may at any time by law make or alter" the date upon which the states voted on U.S. Senators, had ended in a 44–44 tie, which was broken by U.S. Vice-president James S. Sherman.
- The Chamizal dispute was resolved when the International Boundary Commission, consisting of representatives from the U.S., Mexico, and Canada, made its decision in a dispute over a 600-acre piece of land known as El Chamizal, which had been south of the Rio Grande in 1848, until the river's course was shifted by a major flood in 1864 and El Chamizal north of the border. The Commission ruled that 437 of the acres should be returned to Mexico. The U.S. refused to abide by the ruling. On October 28, 1967, the 1911 ruling was finally certified by a new treaty between the two nations, a concrete channel was constructed to prevent further shifting of the Rio Grande, the 5,000 American residents were moved out, and El Chamizal was returned to Mexico.
- The Sixth Conference of the International Woman Suffrage Alliance opened in Stockholm, Sweden.
- Born: Norman Malcolm, American philosopher; in Selden, Kansas (d. 1990).

== June 12, 1911 (Monday) ==
- By a margin of 64–24, the U.S. Senate passed the House resolution for a constitutional amendment to permit direct election of U.S. Senators. At the time, the state legislatures elected their representatives in the Senate. An amendment to the House bill, providing for federal supervision of Senate elections, was tied 44-44, and Vice-president Sherman broke the tie in favor of the Senate bill. The House finally accepted the amended version, 238–39, on May 12, 1912, sending the Seventeenth Amendment to the states for ratification. On April 8, 1913, Connecticut became the 36th of the 48 states to ratify the addition to the United States Constitution.
- Sultan Mehmed V of Turkey offered terms of peace for the Albanians within the Ottoman Empire, granting amnesty to Albanian insurgents who surrendered their weapons, and lifting the ban on Albanian-language schools.
- Born: Milovan Djilas, Yugoslavian and Montenegrin Marxist; in Mojkovac, Kingdom of Montenegro (d. 1995).

== June 13, 1911 (Tuesday) ==
- Igor Stravinsky's ballet Petrushka, choreographed by Michel Fokine, was premiered by Sergei Diaghilev's Ballets Russes at the Théâtre du Châtelet in Paris with Vaslav Nijinsky in the lead. Design was by Alexandre Benois.
- The Majlis, Parliament of Persia gave newly appointed Treasurer-General W. Morgan Shuster, an American financier, full control over Iranian finances, empowering him "to establish whatever departments and appoint all staffs that he considers necessary." Shuster's decrees would lead to a change in government and his firing on January 11, 1912.
- Born:
  - Prince Aly Khan, Imam of Ismaili Shi'a Islam and Pakistani playboy; in Turin, Italy (killed in auto accident, 1960).
  - Luis W. Alvarez, American physicist, inventor, and 1968 Nobel Prize laureate; in San Francisco (d. 1988).

== June 14, 1911 (Wednesday) ==
- Dwight David Eisenhower, age 20, of Abilene, Kansas, took the oath of allegiance and began his military career at the United States Military Academy at West Point, New York, as one of 265 cadets. Eisenhower had been an alternate candidate for the academy, finishing behind another applicant in the qualifying exams, but gained admission after the other man failed a physical examination. In the years that followed his big break, he would graduate 61st in a class of 164, rise in the ranks of the United States Army to five-star general and commander of the Allied Expeditionary Force in Europe during World War II, and, in 1953, the 34th President of the United States.
- RMS Olympic departed from Southampton, England, on its maiden voyage, carrying with it 1,316 passengers and 850 crew. It picked up additional fares at Cherbourg, France and Queenstown, Ireland (June 15), before arriving at New York City on June 21st. At its launch, the White Star Line's "floating hotel" was the largest ship ever, 883 feet in length.

== June 15, 1911 (Thursday) ==
- At Pristina (now in Serbia), Ottoman Sultan Mehmed V signed a general amnesty for all participants in the 1910 and 1911 rebellions against the Turks.
- Born: Wilbert Awdry, English clergyman and children's writer whose The Railway Series books were adapted to the popular TV series Thomas the Tank Engine; in Romsey, Hampshire (d. 1997).

== June 16, 1911 (Friday) ==
- The Computing-Tabulating-Recording Company was incorporated in the State of New York. On February 14, 1924, it would change its name to International Business Machines, more commonly known as IBM and grow in size to become, at one time, the largest manufacturer of electric typewriters and, later, computers.
- Halley's Comet was photographed for the last time in more than 70 years, as it moved on out of the Solar System. It would not be seen again from Earth until October 16, 1982.

== June 17, 1911 (Saturday) ==
- Arab rebels surprised Turkish troops in a battle at the port city of Gheesan (now Jizan, Saudi Arabia), and killed and wounded many of them. By mistake, the Turkish gunboat Sutebbe shelled its own troops. One estimate placed the number of Turkish dead at at least 1,000.
- The Women's Coronation March saw the largest demonstration up to that time in favor of British women's suffrage. Forty thousand women marched in London from Thames Embankment to Albert Hall along the route of the coronation procession.
- The University of Iceland (Haskoli Islands) was founded in Reykjavik with the consolidation of a theological college, a medical school and a law school. The largest higher education institute in the nation, the university has 12,000 students and 1,100 faculty members.

== June 18, 1911 (Sunday) ==
- The Detroit Tigers broke the record for greatest comeback in a baseball game, after trailing the Chicago White Sox by twelve runs. Down 13–1, the Tigers won 16–15. The feat has been duplicated only twice, on June 15, 1925 (the Athletics beat the Indians 17-15 after being down 14–2), and on August 5, 2001 (the Indians won 15-14 after trailing the Mariners 12-0 and 14–2).
- As the water level from inside the wreckage of the battleship USS Maine was lowered, the first human remains from the 1898 explosion were found. Sixty-eight of the men on the Maine were not recovered out of 252 killed.
- Died: James Proctor Knott, 80, former Governor of Kentucky, for whom Knott County, Kentucky was named.

== June 19, 1911 (Monday) ==
- The first Constituent Assembly of the Republic of Portugal, with 192 deputies, convened. The first order of business was to vote for permanent banishment of the former royal family of Braganza. The United States recognized the new republic the same day.
- The General Motors Export Company was organized as the auto manufacturer made plans to begin selling GM vehicles overseas.

== June 20, 1911 (Tuesday) ==
- The first trolleybus service was inaugurated in the United Kingdom, with the cities of Leeds and Bradford being the first to use the electric buses that drew power from overhead wires.
- Actress Sarah Bernhardt, on a visit to the United States, became the first woman to be admitted for a reception at New York's all-male Players Club, breaking a tradition dating back to the social club's founding by Edwin Booth in 1888. Legend has it that "The Divine Miss Sarah" was trapped in the club's elevator for an hour while being escorted to see the apartment that Booth had occupied prior to his death in 1893.

== June 21, 1911 (Wednesday) ==
- The Russian Ballet made its first appearance in Great Britain, with Sergei Diaghilev's company appearing at the Royal Opera House in Covent Garden in conjunction with a presentation of Prince Igor.
- The ship RMS Olympic completed its first transatlantic trip, arriving in New York after a voyage of 5 days, 16 hours and 42 minutes.
- German conductor Felix Mottl had a heart attack while conducting the orchestra for Wagner's opera Tristan und Isolde in Munich. He died 11 days later.

== June 22, 1911 (Thursday) ==
- King George V of the United Kingdom was crowned at Westminster Abbey and his wife was crowned as Queen Mary. At 1:40 pm, the exact moment of George V's coronation, the clock at the Royal Liver Building in Liverpool – the largest electric clock in the British Empire at the time – was set into motion.
- The Wanamaker Grand Organ, largest operating pipe organ in the world, was first played at the Grand Court in Wanamaker's Department Store in Philadelphia, now Macy's.
- Born: Princess Cecilie of Greece and Denmark, elder sister of Britain's Prince Philip, in Tatoi, Greece (killed in plane crash, 1937).

== June 23, 1911 (Friday) ==
- Prime Minister of France Ernest Monis, recovering from injuries sustained on May 21, lost a vote of confidence in the Chamber of Deputies, 243-224, and he and the entire cabinet resigned. The resolution was brought by Deputy Andre Hesse, three days after the Minister of War, General François Goiran, remarked that there was no provision for a Commander in Chief of French forces in time of war.
- Led by Luigj Gurakuqi, Albanian nationalists gathered in the village of Gerche in Montenegro and drafted the "Gerche Memorandum," later reprinted in Libri i Kuq (The Red Book). Demands were made in for Albanian autonomy within the Ottoman Empire, the teaching of the Albanian language in schools, and representation in the Turkish parliament by Albanian deputies.
- Born: Eddie Miller, American jazz musician; in New Orleans (d. 1991).

== June 24, 1911 (Saturday) ==
- SMS Viribus Unitis, the first Austro-Hungarian dreadnought, was launched from the Danubius shipyard at San Rocco, Trieste. The battleship was sunk in 1918 during World War I.
- French fashion designer Paul Poiret held the opulent "One Thousand and Second Night" Ball on Avenue d'Antin in Paris, where he introduced his new oriental designs.
- Born:
  - Juan Manuel Fangio, Argentine race car driver, and winner of five world championships between 1951 and 1957; in Balcarce, Buenos Aires Province (d. 1995).
  - Ernesto Sabato, Argentine writer, in Rojas, Buenos Aires Province (d. 2011).

== June 25, 1911 (Sunday) ==
- As Sultan Mehmed V continued his tour of the Ottoman Empire's European territories, he was greeted by thousands of loyal subjects in Greece as he paid his respects at the tomb of Sultan Murad II at Salonika (now Thessaloniki).
- Born: William H. Stein, American chemist and 1972 Nobel Prize laureate; in New York City (d. 1980).

== June 26, 1911 (Monday) ==
- A group of 40 wealthy travelers, riding in twelve Premier automobiles, began a transcontinental journey, departing from Ohio Avenue in Atlantic City, New Jersey for a 4,617 mile journey to Los Angeles. The "Premier Trip", which concluded in L.A. 45 days later, was followed by American newspaper readers and is said to have "inspired hundreds, and then thousands, of ordinary families to make the cross-country journey by automobile", as well as promoting the creation of a coast-to-coast highway.
- Baron Von Bienerth, the Chancellor of the Empire of Austria resigned after the Christian Socialists lost their majority in Parliament in 2 rounds of voting.
- Born:
  - Mildred "Babe" Didrikson, American Olympic athlete and golfer; in Port Arthur, Texas (d. 1956).
  - Fredrick "Freddie" Calland Williams, British co-inventor of the Williams-Kilborn tube, used for memory in early computer systems; in Romiley, Cheshire (d. 1977).

== June 27, 1911 (Tuesday) ==
- At Niagara Falls, New York, stunt pilot Lincoln Beachey made what Cal Rodgers called "the greatest flight ever made", for the Niagara International Carnival. Beachey flew over the center of the Horseshoe Falls, made a vertical dive through the mist to the river below, pulled up, flew under the 168-foot-high Lower Steel Arch Bridge, and barely cleared the Canadian cliffs, before landing.
- By order of the Oklahoma Supreme Court, Swanson County, Oklahoma, which had been created by gubernatorial proclamation on August 13, 1910, was dissolved. The territory was restored to Kiowa County (which included the county seat, Snyder, Oklahoma and Comanche County.

== June 28, 1911 (Wednesday) ==
- The Nakhla meteorite fell in Egypt at about 9:00 am, near the city of El-Nakhla outside of Alexandria, with 10 kilograms (22 pounds) of mass breaking into forty pieces. The Nakhla meteorite was later determined to be one of 36 Martian meteorites originating from the planet Mars. In 2006, it was suggested by a team led by David McKay that the Nakhla meteorite, as well as an Antarctic one examined in 1996, showed signs of microbe alteration, evidence of life having once existed on Mars. One of the pieces of the Nakhla meteorite was said to have killed a dog, but as one author notes, "there is no real evidence for this having actually happened."
- Wisconsin became the first U.S. state to enact a state income tax, when the state Senate approved the House bill by a margin of 15–14. Governor Francis E. McGovern signed the bill into law on July 13.

== June 29, 1911 (Thursday) ==
- Russia launched its first dreadnought sized battleship, and its largest warship to that time, the Sevastopol.
- Jewish buyers were admitted to the fur sales at Tyumen in Siberia for the first time, after a request by the U.S. Embassy in Russia to Premier Pyotr Stolypin. The Governor of Tobolsk had issued an order prohibiting Jews from attending the fair, including those from the United States.
- The Catholic Foreign Missionary Society of America was founded, with approval granted by Pope Pius X.
- Born:
  - Prince Bernhard of the Netherlands, German-born Prince Consort to Queen Juliana and father of Queen Beatrix; in Jena, Thuringian states (d. 2004).
  - Bernard Herrmann, American film composer whose scores included those for Citizen Kane, Psycho, and Taxi Driver; in New York City (d. 1975).

== June 30, 1911 (Friday) ==
- An A-1 Triad, a seaplane manufactured by the Curtiss Aeroplane Company was purchased by the United States Navy, becoming not only the first U.S. Navy airplane, but also the first airplane acquired by any navy.
- The Fuerzas Regulares Indigenas, commonly referred to as the "Regulares" was founded as an infantry battalion in the Army of Spain, and was initially composed of soldiers from Spanish Morocco under the command of Spanish officers.
Portugal's old flag (top) and new flag (bottom)
- Portugal redesigned its flag and replaced the traditional blue and white monarchist flag following the Republican Revolution.
- Born: Czesław Miłosz, Polish-born American writer and 1980 Nobel Prize laureate; in Szetejnie (now Šeteniai, Lithuania (d. 2004).
