= Aye Ne Win =

Burmese political prisoner

- အေးနေဝင်း
- Born: 15 November 1976 (age 49); Burma
- Occupation: Businessman
- Criminal charges: Plotting to attempt to stage a coup
- Criminal penalty: Life prison sentence and death sentence in 2002
- Criminal status: Released under a presidential pardon in November 2013
- Partner: Shwe Eain Si
- Parents: Aye Zaw Win (father); Sandar Win (mother)
- Relatives: Ne Win (grandfather)

Aye Ne Win (Burmese: အေးနေဝင်း; born 15 November 1976) is a Burmese businessman and former political inmate who spent 11 years in prison for a high treason with plotting to overthrow the Senior General Than Shwe' regime in 2002 along with his two brothers and father, and was released in 2013. He is the grandson of former dictator Ne Win.

== Career ==
Aye Ne Win founded a gang named Scorpion, which earned notoriety for committing terrors, abuse, and harassment of the public.

In 2002, he and his two brothers Kyaw Ne Win, Zwe Ne Win and father Aye Zaw Win were found guilty of plotting to attempt to stage a coup against the then-military regime led by Senior General Than Shwe. They were sentenced to death and also received a life prison sentence for mutiny. However they had been in prison for 11 years. He was released from prison under a presidential pardon in November 2013.

After his release, he has been a prolific user of social media and has been spotted at many public events, including commemorations for fallen soldiers of the Myanmar Army. He has spoken with numerous local and international media outlets, discussing a range of topics including his political and religious views, the continued role of the military in Myanmar's political life and his business dealings. Aye Ne Win was accused by Burmese activist Maung Zarni of being one of the key financiers of the extremist Buddhist nationalist group known as Ma Ba Tha. He is also known for his outspoken Islamophobic views and support for the Rohingya genocide. He reportedly runs several biased media outlets, and cooperates the military generals. He was involved in personal attacks against Rohingya rights activists through his social media posts.

== Personal life ==
Aye Ne Win is the eldest son of Aye Zaw Win and Sandar Win, a daughter of General Ne Win. He has been in a relationship with model Shwe Eain Si since 2017. They are referred to as 'nationalist power couple' for supporting the anti-Rohingya movement in Myanmar.

== In popular culture ==
- Aye Ne Win is the subject of Myat Khine's historic book Ne Win's Resurrected Grandchildren (ဦးနေဝင်း၏ သေရွာပြန်မြေးများ), first published in 2014.
