= July 1911 =

Month of 1911

<<	July 1911					>>
Su	Mo	Tu	We	Th	Fr	Sa
						1
2	3	4	5	6	7	8
9	10	11	12	13	14	15
16	17	18	19	20	21	22
23	24	25	26	27	28	29
30	31

The following events occurred in July 1911:

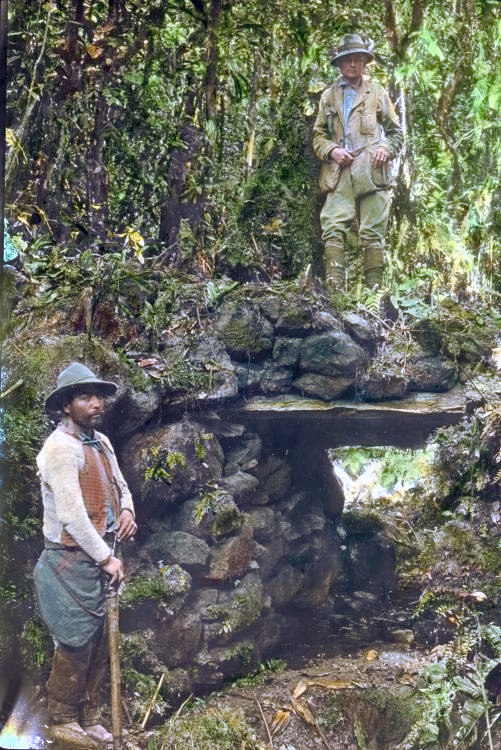
July 24, 1911: Hiram Bingham "rediscovers" Machu Picchu

Peru's Machu Picchu revealed to the rest of the world

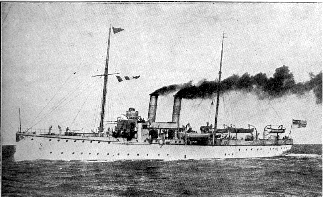
July 3, 1911: German warship Panther brings invasion force to Morocco

== July 1, 1911 (Saturday) ==
- The Agadir Crisis began at noon in Paris, when Germany's Ambassador to France, the Baron von Schoen, made a surprise visit to the French Foreign Ministry and delivered to Foreign Minister Justin de Selves a diplomatic note, announcing that Germany had sent a warship, the gunboat SMS Panther and troops, to occupy Agadir, at that time a part of the protectorate of French Morocco. The pretext was to protect German businesses and citizens in the small port, and the note ended "As soon as order and tranquility have returned to Morocco, the vessel entrusted with this protective mission will leave the port of Agadir." The German infringement on French territory threatened to start a new European war.
- Compulsory military service was inaugurated in Australia.
- Eduard Sachau, linguist and archaeologist, completed his transcription and translation of ancient Aramaic papyri.
- Russia's Jewish Literary Society was ordered closed by Tsarist authorities in the capital city of Saint Petersburg.
- Born: Sergei Sokolov, Marshal of the Soviet Union, and Minister of Defense of USSR (1984–87); in Yevpatoria, Russian Empire (now Ukraine) (d. 2012).

== July 2, 1911 (Sunday) ==
- The comic strip Krazy Kat, by African-American cartoonist George Herriman and was spun off from The Dingbat Family (which it replaced), debuts. The strip ran until Herriman's death in 1944.
- The United States completed its break of diplomatic relations with Colombia, closing the consulate general there.
- The Interstate Commerce Commission ordered an investigation of all express train companies in the United States.
- Claims totaling $250,000 were filed against Mexico for the deaths and injuries of Americans in El Paso during fighting at Juarez.
- Born:
  - Dorothy Horstmann, American physician who made the critical discovery that polio reaches the nervous system through the bloodstream; in Spokane (d. 2001).
  - Diego Fabbri, Italian playwright; in Forlì (d. 1980).
- Died: Felix Mottl, 54, director of the Royal Opera in Munich.

== July 3, 1911 (Monday) ==
- The British strike of seamen ended, with the strikers winning most of their demands.
- Two days after it was dispatched to French Morocco by Germany, the gunboat SMS Panther anchored off of the coast of Agadir.
- The United States Senate voted 55-28 in favor of a resolution holding that the election of Senator William Lorimer of Illinois had been invalid, effectively removing him from office.
- Turk Yurdu Cemiyet, the Association of the Turkish Homeland, was founded by Turkish supremacist Yusuf Akçura, Mehmed Emin and Ahmen Agaoglu.

== July 4, 1911 (Tuesday) ==
- Third baseman Rafael Almeida and outfielder Armando Marsans, both natives of Cuba, became the first Hispanic players in Major League Baseball history, debuting in Chicago for the Cincinnati Reds against the Cubs. Although the two were dark-skinned and had played for a Negro team, they avoided the ban against African-American players by producing proof that they "were of Castilian rather than Negro heritage."
- The hottest day of the 1911 United States heat wave set records that stood a century later, in Vermont (105° in Vernon) and New Hampshire (106° in Nashua), as well as 104° in Boston, and 113° in Junction City, Kansas. In Chicago, 64 died in one day, and 51 the day before.
- Born:
  - Mitch Miller, American singer and television personality (Sing Along with Mitch); in Rochester, New York (d. 2010).
  - Frederick Seitz, American physicist, and co-proponent of Wigner–Seitz cell; in San Francisco (d. 2008).
  - Elizabeth Peratrovich, civil rights activist for Alaskan native peoples; in Petersburg, Alaska (d. 1958).
- Died:
  - Vaughan Kester, 41, American novelist.
  - Franklin Fyles, 64, American playwright and theater critic.

== July 5, 1911 (Wednesday) ==
- By a 253-46 vote, Britain's House of Lords passed a watered down version of the Parliament Act 1911 received from the House of Commons, including amendments made by Lord Lansdowne.
- The record-breaking heat wave in North America ended after five days of record high temperatures. In the first five days of July, more than 500 deaths were attributed to the heat.
- Turkey began military preparations to suppress a revolt in Montenegro.
- Born: Georges Pompidou, President of France from 1969 to 1974, Prime Minister 1962-68; in Montboudif, Cantal département (d. 1974).
- Died: Maria Pia of Savoy, 63, Queen Consort of Portugal 1862-1889 as the wife of King Luis I, and later Queen Dowager of Portugal until the monarchy was abolished in 1910.

== July 6, 1911 (Thursday) ==
- Charles Flint acquired nearly all of the Computing-Tabulating-Recording Company (which later became IBM), buying out Herman Hollerith for $1,210,500. For the next 10 years, Hollerith retained control of design changes in the CTR tabulating machines and stifled the growth of the company.
- Publisher Charles Curtis debuted a new version of the farmers' magazine Country Gentleman, whose circulation had declined to only 2,000 paying subscribers at the time of acquisition. Within 30 years, he had increased the number of subscribers to 2,000,000. The magazine was discontinued in 1955 after being sold to the Farm Journal.
- An arbitration treaty between the United States and the United Kingdom was signed.

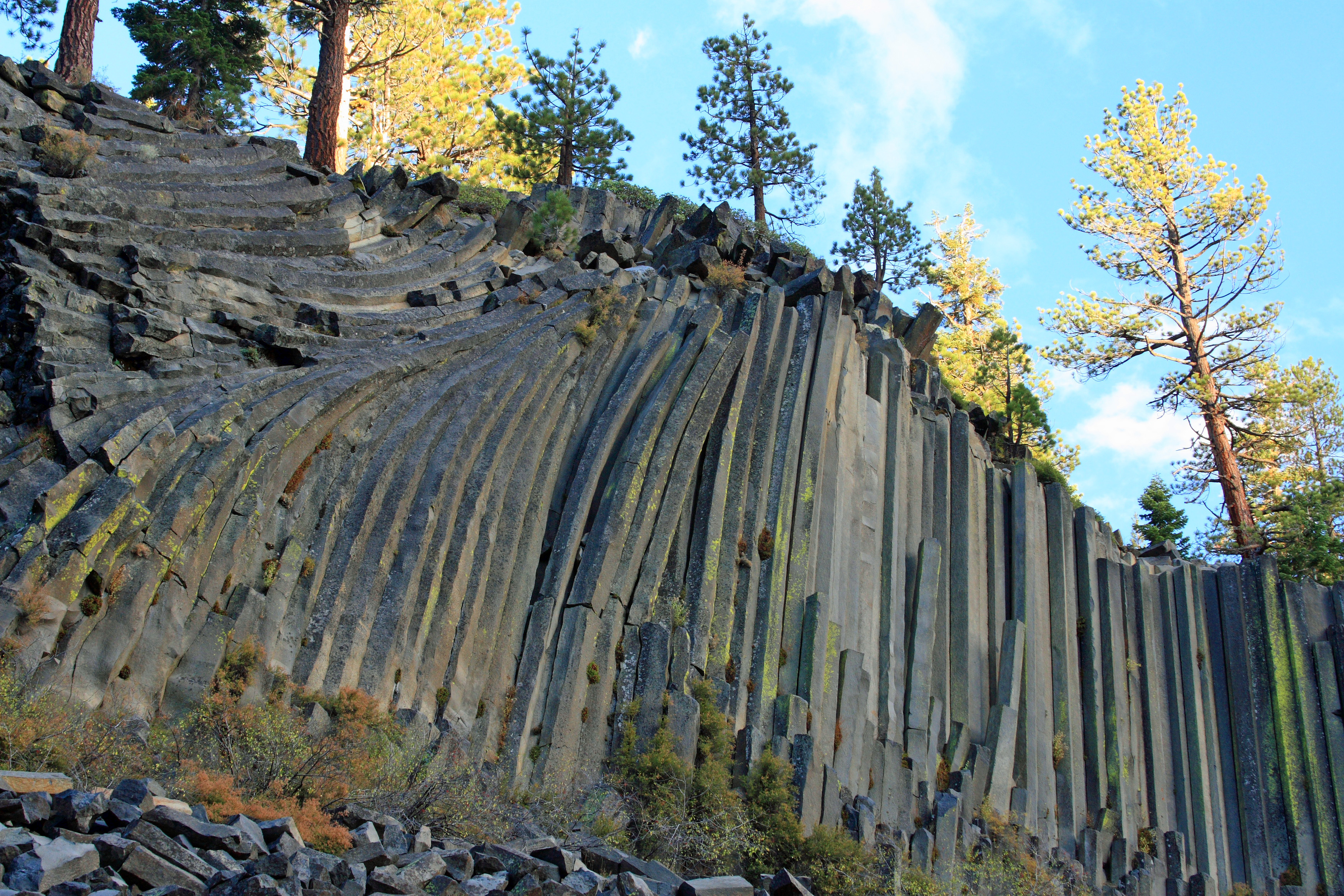
The Devil's Postpile, rescued from destruction

- U.S. President William H. Taft created the Devils Postpile National Monument in Madera County, California as federal territory after learning that mining companies were planning to demolish the area's hundreds of pillars of columnar basalt in order to build a dam. The Devils Postpile had been formed one million years earlier from volcanic lava that had cooled into columns of basalt that stood 60 feet (18 m) high. Only two other similar examples are known on Earth, the Giant's Causeway in Northern Ireland and Fingal's Cave in Scotland. Taft's order prevented the dynamiting of the natural wonder for use as construction material.
- Born: LaVerne Andrews, American singer and the eldest of the 1940s trio The Andrews Sisters; in Minneapolis (d. 1967).

== July 7, 1911 (Friday) ==
- In Washington, DC, the United States, Russia, the United Kingdom and Japan signed the Convention on the International Protection of Fur Seals, prohibiting hunting of the endangered fur seals in the North Pacific Ocean. In the first six years, the seal population increased by 30%.
- King George V and Queen Mary arrived in Dublin for a visit as sovereigns of Ireland. They stayed until July 12.
- Born: Gian-Carlo Menotti, Italian-born American composer (Amahl and the Night Visitors); in Cadegliano-Viconago (d. 2007).
- Died:
  - Edward Dicey, 79, English journalist and novelist.
  - Alexander C. Mitchell, 50, U.S. Congressman who represented Kansas for only four months before his death.

== July 8, 1911 (Saturday) ==
- The city of Burbank, California, with 500 residents, was incorporated. One century later, its population was over 100,000.
- U.S. Vice President James S. Sherman, in his capacity as President of the U.S. Senate, broke a long-standing tradition in Congress of using only hand fans for cooling, by bringing the first electric fan to the Senate Chamber. The same day, other members of Congress followed suit.
- Died: Ira Erastus Davenport, 72, American spiritualist and magician.

== July 9, 1911 (Sunday) ==
- Francisco I. Madero, who had won election as the President of Mexico in 1909 as the candidate of the Partido Nacional Antirreeleccionista (the National Anti-Reelection Party) on a platform of preventing presidents from serving consecutive terms, issued a manifesto rebranding the party after having accomplished the mission of amending the Mexican Constitution to allow presidents to serve a single six-year term. Madero's organization was renamed the Progressive Constitutionalist Party (Partido Constitucional Progresista).
- The leaders of France and Germany agreed to negotiate an end to the Agadir Crisis that had arisen over the two nations' African colonies. Ultimately, Germany would recognize France's protectorate status over Morocco in return for the transfer of portions of the French Congo to Germany's neighboring colony, Kamerun.
- Born:
  - John Archibald Wheeler, American theoretical physicist who coined the astronomical terms "black hole" and "wormhole"; in Jacksonville, Florida (d. 2008).
  - Mervyn Peake, British writer and illustrator, best known for the Gormenghast series of books; in Lushan, Jiangxi Province, China (d. 1968).
  - Aleksandrs Laime, Latvian-born explorer, most noted for being the first recorded human to reach Venezuela's Angel Falls; in Riga (d. 1994).

== July 10, 1911 (Monday) ==
- In arbitration by King George V, Chile was ordered to pay $935,000 to the United States Alsop firm. Alsop had demanded $3,000,000 with interest; the $935K was paid on November 13.
- The Royal Australian Navy was bestowed its name by King George V, having previously been the "Commonwealth Naval Forces."
- Troops from Peru, arriving on the launch Loreto and backed up by the gunboat America, arrived at the settlement of La Pedrera, established by Colombia on disputed territory on the Apaporis, a tributary of the Amazon River. Peruvian Lt. Col. Oscar Benavides gave the Colombians an ultimatum to abandon the outpost. After a battle of two days, the Colombians surrendered, and agreements on July 15 and July 19 ended the fighting.

== July 11, 1911 (Tuesday) ==
- The Federal Express, a passenger train on the New York, New Haven & Hartford Railroad running the Boston to Washington route, jumped the track at Bridgeport at 3:35 am, killing 14 people and injured 42 more.
- France's Chamber of Deputies voted 476-77 to postpone further discussion of the Moroccan problem.
- The mining settlement of South Porcupine, Ontario was destroyed by forest fires that swept across the province. Forest fires had broken out across Northern Ontario, and over four days, they would kill 400 or more people.

== July 12, 1911 (Wednesday) ==
- Ty Cobb of the Detroit Tigers, whose career record of stealing home 54 times is unbroken, stole second base, third base and home on three consecutive pitches by Harry Krause in the first inning of a 9-0 win over the Philadelphia Athletics.
- Au Sable, Michigan, was destroyed by forest fires.

== July 13, 1911 (Thursday) ==
- Seventeen years old, Prince Edward of the United Kingdom (the future King Edward VIII), was invested as the Prince of Wales. For the first time since 1616, the ceremony took place in Wales itself, at Caernarfon Castle, as a result of the efforts of Chancellor of the Exchequer David Lloyd George, a Welshman.
- The Third Anglo-Japanese Agreement of Alliance was signed by the United Kingdom and Japan, extending the date of expiry from 1915 to 1921.

== July 14, 1911 (Friday) ==
- Rain began falling at Baguio in the Philippines and, between noon until noon the next day, broke the record for most rainfall in 24 hours (45.99 inches; 1168 mm). By the time rain ended three days later, the total amount had been 88.85 inches (2239 mm). The 46 inch rainfall represented 1,350,000 gallons of water, weighing 5,400 tons, per acre.
- Aviator Harry Atwood broke the record for distance traveled in an airplane, flying 576 miles from Boston to Washington, DC, where he came in for a landing on the south lawn of the White House.
- Born:
  - William Norris, American entrepreneur and computer pioneer, founder of Control Data Corporation; in Red Cloud, Nebraska (d. 2006).
  - Terry-Thomas, English comic actor, as Thomas Terry Hoar-Stevens; in Finchley, Middlesex (d. 1990).
  - Gertrude Scharff Goldhaber, German-born American physicist, in Mannheim (d. 1998).

== July 15, 1911 (Saturday) ==
- Germany's Foreign Minister Alfred von Kiderlen-Waechter summoned French Ambassador Jules Cambon to the Ministry and made the surprise demand that France cede its colony in the French Congo to Germany as a condition of German withdrawal from Morocco.
- Turkish Troops commanded by Edhem Pasha were ambushed by Albanian rebels at Ipek, with 200 Turks killed and wounded.
- The German-Japanese treaty of commerce was ratified at Tokyo.
- An explosion at the Cascade Mine at Sykesville, Pennsylvania, killed 21 coal miners.
- Born: Hans von Luck, German panzer commander in World War II; in Flensburg (d. 1997).
- Died: Noble P. Swift, president of the Swift & Company meatpacking monopoly.

== July 16, 1911 (Sunday) ==
- The Armenian patriarch of Turkey presented a list of grievances to the government, demanding improvements on education, use of the Armenian language, the right to participate in military service, and the right to present Christians as witnesses in court proceedings in the Islamic nation. The government pledged reforms, which were blocked in the Ottoman parliament.
- Born:
  - Ginger Rogers, American actress and dance partner of Fred Astaire; as Virginia McMath in Independence, Missouri (d. 1995).
  - Jerry Burke, American pianist for the Lawrence Welk Show; in Marshalltown, Iowa (d. 1965).

== July 17, 1911 (Monday) ==
- The United States Census Bureau announced that the U.S. center of population had moved westward to Unionville, in Monroe County, Indiana.
- The U.S.-Japanese treaty of Commerce and Navigation went into effect.
- Newspaper reporter Andre Jager-Schmidt of the Paris daily Excelsior, set off from Paris on an assignment to travel around the world more quickly than ever before. The existing record at the time was 54 days, set by James Willis Sayre in the autumn of 1903. Jager-Schmidt arrived back in Paris 39 days later on August 26.
- The town of Hutto, Texas was incorporated.
- The Brescia Calcio football club was founded.
- Born: Bulent Rauf, Turkish mystic and spiritualist; in Beylerbeyi (d. 1987).

== July 18, 1911 (Tuesday) ==
- Transported with Russian help on the steamer Christoforos, Mohammad Ali Shah Qajar, the deposed Shah of Persia, landed at the Caspian Sea port of Astarabad with an army in an attempt to regain the throne that he had lost in 1909. The Russian-supplied guns, cannons and munitions had been packed in crates labelled "mineral water."
- Born: Hume Cronyn, Canadian film actor and husband of Jessica Tandy; in London, Ontario (d. 2003).
- Died: Hermann Adler, 52, Chief Rabbi of the British Empire since 1891.

== July 19, 1911 (Wednesday) ==
- The United States Board on Geographic Names reversed its 20-year-old decision to spell the name of Pittsburgh, Pennsylvania without the final "H". The reversal followed years of lobbying by city and state officials.
- Walter Carlisle, centerfielder of the Vernon Tigers of the Pacific Coast League, made an unassisted triple play in a game against the Los Angeles Angels, and put his name in the record books as the only outfielder to perform the feat.

== July 20, 1911 (Thursday) ==
- General Auguste Dubail of France and Sir Henry Wilson, Field Marshal of the British Army, reached an agreement for a joint plan to mobilize 150,000 men in the event that Germany declared war on either nation. Though the Dubail-Wilson plan did not become necessary in 1911, it would be used three years later when World War I broke out.
- Rebels in Haiti captured Cap-Haïtien and began marching on Port-au-Prince.
- King Nicholas of Montenegro hosted representatives from Britain, France, Russia, Austria-Hungary and Italy to resolve the Albanian-Turkish war.

== July 21, 1911 (Friday) ==
- The Brooklyn Rapid Transit Company was awarded the $235,000,000 contract for the construction of 87 miles of new subway and elevated train lines.
- David Lloyd George, the British Chancellor of the Exchequer, gave a speech making the government's position clear, that the United Kingdom would not remain neutral, and would come to the aid of France in the event of an attack by Germany.
- Born: Marshall McLuhan, Canadian media theorist and author, credited with coining the term "global village" and the phrase, "The medium is the message;" in Edmonton (d. 1980).

== July 22, 1911 (Saturday) ==
- The U.S. Senate passed the Canadian Reciprocity Bill, 53-27.
- Voters in Texas defeated a referendum proposing the prohibition of the sale of liquor, 234,000 to 228,000.
- After returning to Persia with the help of the Russian Empire, former Shah Mohammad Ali Shah Qajar entered Astrabad (now Gorgan, Iran), where he was welcomed by residents eager to restore him to the throne.

== July 23, 1911 (Sunday) ==
- The Jebtsundamba Khutuktu, spiritual head of Mongol Buddhists, hosted the Russian consul and told him that the Mongol minority wished to send a delegation to Saint Petersburg to ask the aid of the Russian government in separating Mongolia from the Chinese Empire.

== July 24, 1911 (Monday) ==
- Hiram Bingham III rediscovered the Inca Empire site of Machu Picchu, hitherto unknown to most of the world, with the assistance of Melchor Arteaga, who guided the Bingham party up a mountain overlooking Torontoy, after directions from 8-year-old Melquiades Richarte.
- The Indian Institute of Science, a university located in Bangalore, began its first classes.
- Martial law was proclaimed in Tehran, and the National Council demanded the resignation of the Premier.
- The British cruiser HMS Fox captured two ships in the Persian Gulf carrying rifles and ammunition for the former Shah.
- Wilfrid Laurier, the Prime Minister of Canada, delivered an ultimatum to Conservative members of Parliament to either ratify the Reciprocity Treaty with the United States or to face dissolution and new elections.
- The Cleveland Naps (now the Cleveland Guardians) hosted baseball's first all-star game, the Addie Joss Benefit Game, competing against an assembled group of American League players in a benefit game for the family of the late Addie Joss. The all-star team, which included Ty Cobb, Tris Speaker and other prominent baseball players, beat Cleveland 5-3, in a game that raised $13,000 for Joss's family.
- The scout ship USS Chester arrived in Haiti to protect American interests there, three days after dispatch from Newport, Rhode Island.

== July 25, 1911 (Tuesday) ==
- The cause of action in the landmark case of MacPherson v. Buick Motor Co. happened near Saratoga Springs, New York, when Donald MacPherson was severely injured when the wooden spokes of the left rear wheel of his Buick Model 10 automobile collapsed, throwing the car into a telephone pole and throwing him under the car's rear axle. MacPherson's suit led to an opinion from New York State's highest court that created product liability as a tortious action. Written by Benjamin Cardozo, later a justice of the United States Supreme Court, the reasoning of the 1916 decision was adopted by other states and "initiated the modern concept of consumer protection."
- Bobby Leach became the second person (after Annie Edson Taylor), and the first man, to ride over Niagara Falls in a barrel and survive. Leach, who survived a 17-story plunge over a waterfall, would later suffer a fatal injury from slipping on an orange peel.

== July 26, 1911 (Wednesday) ==
- Nearly 2,500 delegates of all races and religions gathered in London for the First Universal Races Congress. A series of speakers at the three-day symposium promoted racial harmony, debunked differences between the “so-called whites” and “so-called colored” races, and called for ‘’the establishment of harmonious relations between the divisions of mankind.’’ Among those in attendance were Mohandas Gandhi, W.E.B. DuBois, Jane Addams, H.G. Wells, and dozens of prominent professors and politicians.
- Golden Gate Park of San Francisco was selected as the site for the Panama-Pacific Exposition of 1915.
- U.S. President Taft signed the American-Canadian reciprocity bill at 3:09 pm, while the Canadian Parliament had dissolved without voting on the measure.
- The cruiser USS Des Moines arrived at Port-au-Prince to protect American citizens and businesses from an ongoing revolt in Haiti.
- The Canadian Pacific liner Empress of China was wrecked off the coast of Japan and put out of passenger service permanently.
- Dusé Mohamed Ali convened the first Universal Races Congress, held in London.
- At a fair in Plainfield, Illinois, "Professor" Harry Darnell, a balloonist whose act featured a performance on a trapeze, lost his footing and fell 700 feet to his death.

== July 27, 1911 (Thursday) ==
- French Minister of Defense Adolphe Messimy ordered that any officer who was "unable to ride a horse" was to retire in response to the French Army's reluctance to retire aging or infirm generals. The order was seen as impractical and rescinded shortly after being ordered. Most of the officers remained in positions of command until being removed in August and September 1914, after the outbreak of World War I.
- Omar N. Bradley, 18, of Moberly, Missouri, was notified that he had been accepted to the U.S. Military Academy and that he had five days to report to West Point, New York. He would become among the 164 graduates of the Class of 1915, of whom 59 went on to become generals, including Bradley and Dwight D. Eisenhower, both of whom reached the five-star rank.
- Born: Rayner Heppenstall, British novelist and radio producer; in Lockwood, West Yorkshire (d. 1981).

== July 28, 1911 (Friday) ==
- General Joseph Joffre was installed as the first Chief of the General Staff of the Army of France, a position that had been created to remedy the lack of a peacetime commander-in-chief of the Army.
- Paul Geidel, a 17-year old bellboy at the Iroquois Hotel in New York City, was arrested after killing an elderly stockbroker, William Henry Jackson, who was a guest. Geidel would remain in prison for more than 68 years, finally being released at the age of 86 from the Fishkill Correctional Facility in Beacon, New York on May 7, 1980. His incarceration remains the longest-ever time served by an American inmate.
- At the age of seven months, future French novelist Jean Genet was left by his mother at the Bureau d'Abandon de l'Hospice des Enfants-Assistes in Paris, to become a ward of the state, and was placed with a foster family the next day.
- Haitian troops defeated rebels in a battle at Les Cayes.
- Canadian Prime Minister Wilfrid Laurier announced a plan of cooperation between Canada and the navies of Great Britain, Australia and New Zealand.
- The Australasian Antarctic Expedition began as the SY Aurora departed London.

== July 29, 1911 (Saturday) ==
- Parliament was dissolved in Canada after continued obstruction to the reciprocity bill with the United States, with an election set for September 21. The Conservative Party, led by Robert Borden and opposing reciprocity, would win a majority in the next election.
- A bounty of $100,000 (33,000 pounds) for the capture or killing of the ex-Shah was set by the Persian government.
- Born: Ján Cikker, Slovak classical composer; in Besztercebánya, Austro-Hungarian Empire (now Banská Bystrica, Slovakia) (d. 1989).

== July 30, 1911 (Sunday) ==
- Author Henry James, who had been born in New York City, left the United States for the last time. James, who had alternated between Europe and North America as his residence, would become a British citizen prior to his death in 1916.

== July 31, 1911 (Monday) ==
- General Motors went public, becoming the first automobile company to list its stock for sale on the New York Stock Exchange.
- Russia's ambassador to Persia demanded the resignation of Treasurer General W. Morgan Shuster, an American businessman who had been hired by the Iranian parliament to manage the nation's finances. Germany's minister made a similar demand the next day.
- Standard Oil announced its plans for breaking up the monopoly by November.
