= Sandar Win =

Burmese physician (born 1952)

Khin Sandar Win
- ခင်စန္ဒာဝင်း
- Born: 1952 (age 73–74); Rangoon, Burma
- Education: Methodist English High School; Institute of Medicine 1, Rangoon
- Spouse: Aye Zaw Win
- Children: Kyaw Ne Win; Zwe Ne Win; Aye Ne Win
- Parent: Ne Win

Khin Sandar Win (also spelt Khin Sanda Win; Burmese: ခင်စန္ဒာဝင်း; born 1952 in Rangoon, Burma) is the daughter of former Burmese dictator Ne Win. She played a major role in the suppression of the democracy movement after her father resigned as ruler in 1988.

Sandar Win is a medical doctor and later she left the military's medical services and became a businesswoman. Before her detention, she presided over the Ne Win clan as it developed a significant business empire encompassing hotels, medical services and telecommunications.

== Biography ==
Sandar was educated at the Methodist English High School in Yangon (now Basic Education High School No. 1 Dagon). She graduated from high school with the highest University Entrance Examination matriculation scores in all of Burma, according to newspaper accounts. She then attended Institute of Medicine 1, Rangoon, to become a doctor, working as a gynaecologist.

She is considered Ne Win's favourite daughter. Sandar Win is believed to have been influential throughout the 26-year reign of her father, often acting as a mediator between Ne Win and the BSPP (Burma Socialist Programme Party). As Ne Win grew older and his health deteriorated, she took on an increasingly important role. Sandar Win was a key figure in suppressing the 1988 uprisings, during which thousands of Burmese protested demanding democratic control.

Sandar Win was also influential in the Burma Socialist Programme Party's decision to reemphasize English language education. After she failed to be admitted into a medical school in England because of poor English skills, English was reintroduced as a medium of instruction in secondary and higher education.

After 1988, she left the military's medical services and became a businesswoman. She presided over the Ne Win clan as it developed a significant business empire encompassing hotels, medical services, telecommunications and a popular Yangon nightclub.

Sandar Win was placed under house arrest in her lakeside house on University Avenue Road, on the banks of Inya Lake, Yangon in 2002. Sandar Win's husband, Aye Zaw Win, along with Kyaw Ne Win, Aye Ne Win, Zwe Ne Win and other family members and the family astrologer, were convicted of plotting a coup in the late 1990s, and were imprisoned in Insein. After 6 years of house arrest, she was released in 2008.

After disappearing from public view for many years, she attended the ceremony of 2022 Armed Forces Day alongside her sons.
