= Ne Win =

Leader of Burma (1958–1960; 1962–1988)

General Ne Win Agga Maha Thray Sithu
- နေဝင်း
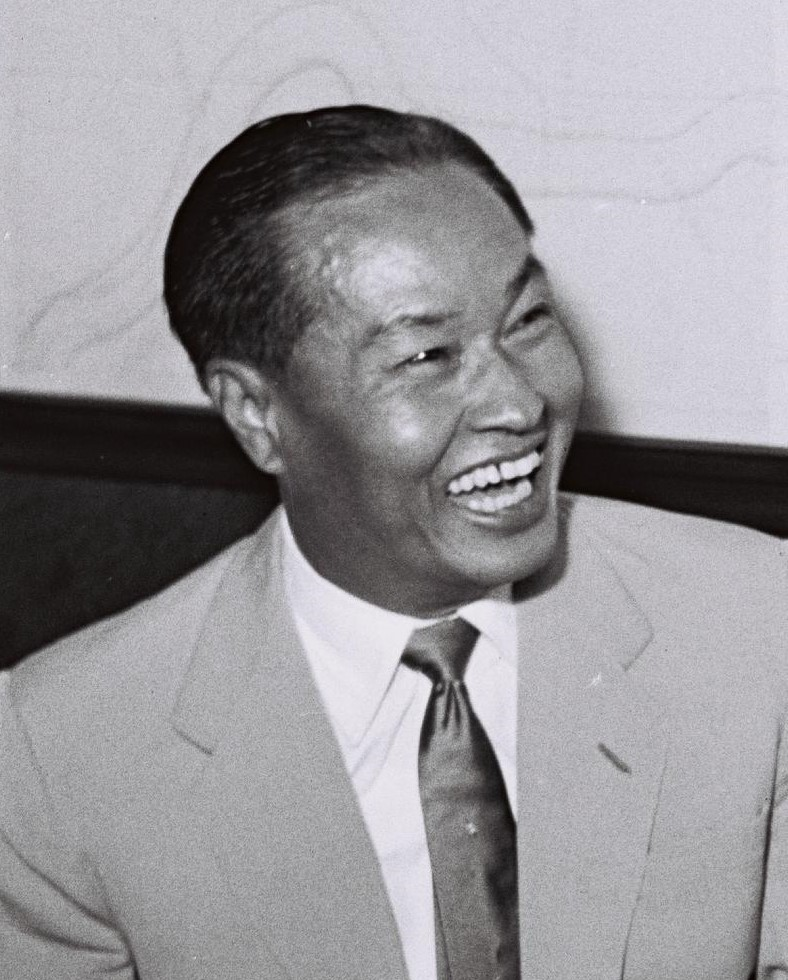
- Ne Win in 1959

Chairman of the Burma Socialist Programme Party
- In office 4 July 1962 – 23 July 1988
- Preceded by: Position established
- Succeeded by: Sein Lwin

4th President of Burma
- In office 2 March 1974 – 9 November 1981
- Prime Minister: Sein Win; Maung Maung Kha
- Preceded by: Himself (as Chairman of the RC); Win Maung (as President, 1962)
- Succeeded by: San Yu

Chairman of the Revolutionary Council of the Union of Burma
- In office 2 March 1962 – 2 March 1974
- Deputy: Aung Gyi
- Preceded by: Position established; Win Maung (as President)
- Succeeded by: Position abolished; Himself (as President)
Other offices held
3rd Prime Minister of the Union of Burma
In office 29 October 1958 – 4 April 1960
President	Win Maung
Deputy	Thein Maung; Lun Baw
Preceded by	U Nu
Succeeded by	U Nu
Chairman of the Revolutionary Government of the Union of Burma
In office 2 March 1962 – 2 March 1974
Leader	Himself
Preceded by	U Nu (as Prime Minister)
Succeeded by	Sein Win (as Prime Minister)
Deputy Prime Minister of the Union of Burma
In office 2 April 1949 – 10 December 1949
Prime Minister	U Nu
Preceded by	Kyaw Nyein
Succeeded by	Sao Hkun Hkio

Commander-in-Chief of Defence Services
- In office 1 February 1949 – 20 April 1972
- Deputy: Aung Gyi; San Yu
- Preceded by: Smith Dun
- Succeeded by: San Yu

Personal details
- Born: Shu Maung; 24 May 1911 Paungdale, Pegu Province, Lower Burma, British India (present-day Myanmar)
- Died: 5 December 2002 (aged 91) Yangon, Myanmar
- Party: BSPP
- Spouse: 5, including June Rose Bellamy
- Children: 6, including Sandar Win
- Education: Rangoon University
- Occupation: Military officer; politician
- Awards: Agga Maha Thray Sithu (Myanmar); Order of the Rajamitrabhorn (Thailand); Bintang Jasa Utama (Indonesia)

Military service
- Allegiance: Socialist Republic of the Union of Burma
- Branch/service: Burmese Army
- Years of service: 1931–1974
- Rank: General
- Battles/wars: World War II

Ne Win (Note: Burmese: နေဝင်း; IPA: [nè wɪ́ɰ̃]) (born Shu Maung; (Note: Burmese: ရှုမောင်; IPA: [/ʃù màʊ̃̀/]) 24 May 1911 – 5 December 2002) was a Burmese general and politician who served as Burma's head of government (Note: Prime Minister (1958–1960) and Chairman of Revolutionary Government (1962–1974)) from 1958 to 1960 and again from 1962 to 1974; and also as head of state (Note: Chairman of Revolutionary Council (1962–1974) and President (1974–1981)) from 1962 to 1981. Ne Win was Burma's military dictator during the Socialist Republic of the Union of Burma period of 1962 to 1988. (Note: Ne Win was earlier the President of Union of Burma for 12 years from 2 March 1962 to 2 March 1974 and then later the President of Socialist Republic of the Union of Burma for 7 years and 252 days from 2 March 1974 to 9 November 1981.(See list))

Ne Win founded the Burma Socialist Programme Party (BSPP) and overthrew the democratic Union Parliament of U Nu in the 1962 Burmese coup d'état, establishing Burma as a one-party socialist state under the Burmese Way to Socialism ideology. Ne Win was Burma's de facto leader as chairman of the BSPP, serving in various official titles as part of his military government, and was known by his supporters as U Ne Win. (Note: "U" is an honorific in Burmese, roughly equal to "Mr" or "Uncle".) His rule was characterized by a non-aligned foreign policy, isolationism, one-party rule, economic stagnation, and superstition. Ne Win resigned in July 1988 in response to the 8888 Uprising that overthrew the Burma Socialist Programme Party, and was replaced by the military junta of the State Law and Order Restoration Council (SLORC). He held minor influence in the 1990s but was eventually placed under house arrest, under which he died in 2002. There was no state funeral, public eulogy or monument in his memory.

In foreign affairs, Ne Win followed a strictly neutralist policy during the Cold War, participating in the Non-Aligned Movement and keeping his distance from both the United States and the Soviet Union. On the other hand, his relations with Mao Zedong and China were initially excellent, but were temporarily broken between 1967 and 1971, due to Mao's covert support for the Communist insurgency within Burma and the outbreak of anti-Chinese riots by regime supporters; however, in March 1971 relations were fully restored and Chinese economic aid continued.

== Date of birth ==
Ne Win's date of birth is a subject of debate among various sources. The English-language publication Who's Who in Burma, published in 1961 by People's Literature House, Rangoon, lists Ne Win's birthdate as 14 May 1911. This date is also supported by Dr. Maung Maung in the Burmese version of his book Burma and General Ne Win, also published in English, that Ne Win was born on 14 May 1911. However, in a book written in Burmese titled The Thirty Comrades, the author Kyaw Nyein gave Ne Win's date of birth as 10 July 1910. While 24 May 1911 is widely cited as Ne Win's birthdate in many scholarly works and biographical references, the discrepancies among sources warrant acknowledgment. These conflicting accounts highlight the challenges in determining Ne Win's exact birthdate and may stem from differences in historical documentation or cultural interpretations. Therefore, while 24 May 1911 is commonly accepted, alternative dates cannot be disregarded entirely.

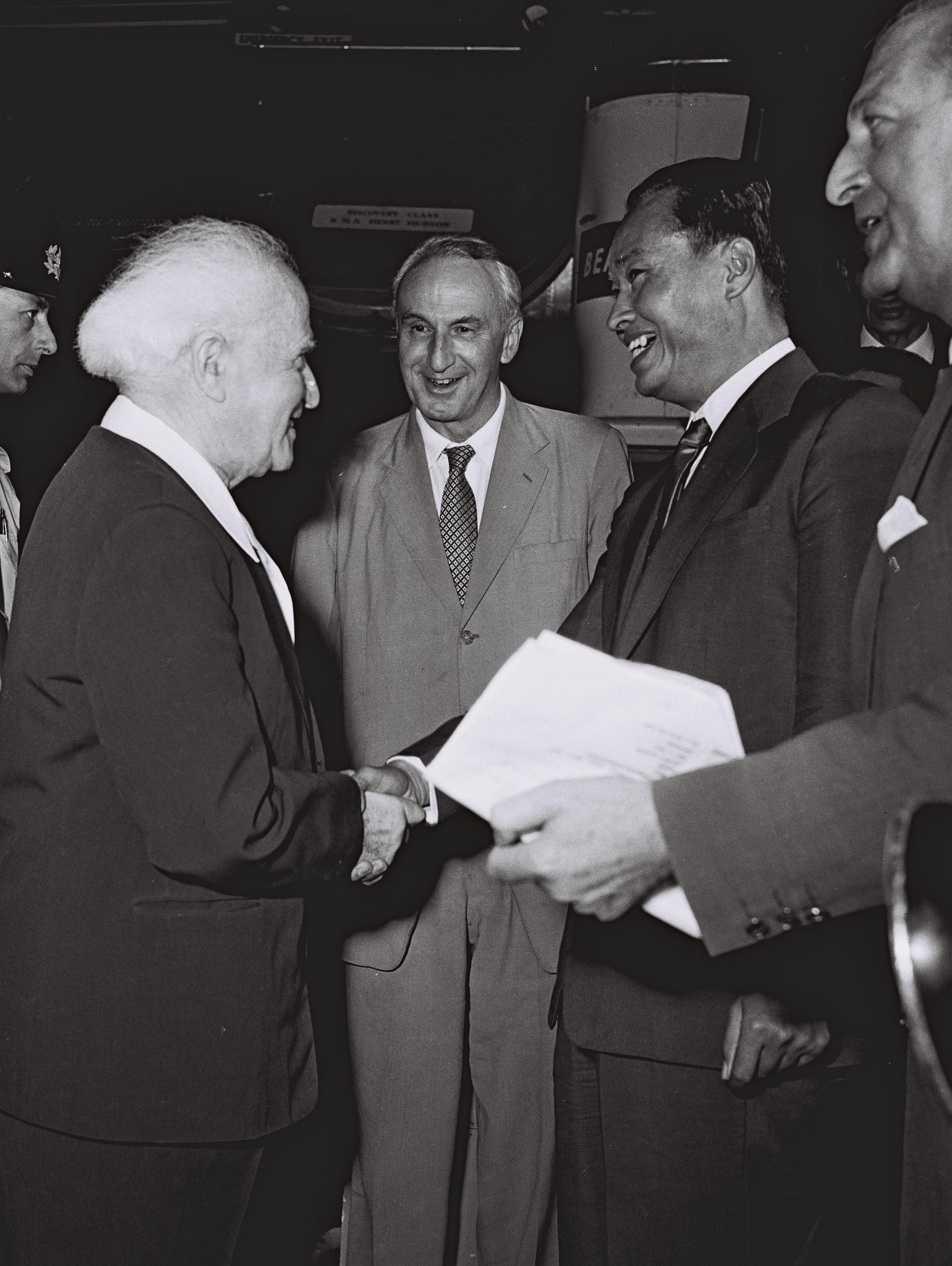
David Ben-Gurion, the Prime Minister of Israel and General Ne Win as Prime Minister of Burma on 8 June 1959

Kyaw Nyein's date of 1910 can be considered as the more plausible date. First, Kyaw Nyein had access to historical records and he interviewed many surviving members of the Thirty Comrades when he wrote the book in the mid-to late 1990s. (Ne Win was one of the Thirty Comrades who secretly went to undergo military training in the early 1940s for the purpose of fighting for independence from the British). In his book published around 1998, Kyaw Nyein lists the names of the surviving members of the Thirty Comrades whom he had interviewed, although Ne Win was not mentioned among them. Secondly, when Ne Win died on 5 December 2002, the Burmese language newspapers that were allowed to carry a paid obituary stated the age of 'U Ne Win' to be '93 years'. According to Burmese custom, a person's age is their age upon their next birthday. Since Ne Win turned 92 in July 2002, when he died in December 2002 he was considered to be 93 years old. Most Western news agencies, based on the May 1911 birth date, reported that Ne Win was 91 years old, but the obituary put up by his family (most probably his children) stated that he was 93 years old, which most likely stems from East Asian age reckoning.

== Early life and struggle for independence ==
Ne Win, born Shu Maung, was born into an ethnic Burman family in a small village near Paungdale about 200 miles (320 km) north of Rangoon. Research by renowned Burma scholar Robert Taylor finds rumors of Ne Win having full or partial Chinese ancestry unsubstantiated. His family and colleagues have repeatedly denied Ne Win had any Chinese ancestry. He spent two years at Rangoon University beginning in 1929, and took biology as his main subject with hopes of becoming a doctor. In 1931 he was expelled from the university after he failed an exam. Ne Win eventually became "Thakin Shu Maung", or a member of the nationalist organisation Dobama Asiayone (We Burmans Association). Other members of the group included Aung San and U Nu. In 1941 Ne Win, as a member of the Ba Sein-Tun Ok (Socialist) faction of the Dobama, was one of thirty young men chosen for military training by the Japanese operative Colonel Suzuki Keiji. Their leader was Aung San and they formed the Burma Independence Army (BIA). During military training, Shu Maung chose a nom de guerre, Bo Ne Win (Commander Radiant Sun). In early 1942 the Japanese Army and the BIA entered Burma in the wake of the retreating British forces. Ne Win's role in the campaign was to organize resistance behind the British lines.

The experience of the Japanese occupation of Burma worked to alienate the nationalists as well as the population at large. Toward the end of the Second World War, on 27 March 1945 the Burma National Army (BNA, successor to the BIA) turned against the Japanese following the British re-invasion of Burma. Ne Win, as one of the BNA Commanders, was quick to establish links with the British – attending the Kandy conference in Ceylon and taking charge of the anti-Communist operations in the Pyinmana area as commander of the 4th Burma Rifles after the Red Flag Communists and the Communist Party of Burma went underground to fight against the government in October 1946 and on 28 March 1948 respectively. Burma obtained independence on 4 January 1948, and for the first 14 years it had a parliamentary and democratic government mainly under Prime Minister U Nu, but the country was riven with political division. Even before independence, Aung San was assassinated together with six of his cabinet members on 19 July 1947; U Saw, a pre-war prime minister and political rival of Aung San, was found guilty of the crime and executed. U Nu as leader of the Socialists took charge of the Anti-Fascist People's Freedom League (AFPFL) formed by the Communists, Socialists and the BNA in 1945 now that Aung San was dead and the Communists expelled from the AFPFL.

== Post-independence civil war ==
Following independence there were uprisings in the army and among ethnic minority groups. In late 1948, after a confrontation between army rivals, Ne Win was appointed second in command of the army and his rival Bo Zeya, a communist commander and fellow member of the Thirty Comrades, took a portion of the army into rebellion. Ne Win immediately adopted a policy of creating Socialist militia battalions called 'Sitwundan' under his personal command with the approval of U Nu. On 31 January 1949, Ne Win was appointed Chief of Staff of the Armed Forces (Tatmadaw) and given total control of the army, replacing General Smith Dun, an ethnic Karen. He rebuilt and restructured the armed forces along the ruling Socialist Party's political lines, but the country was still split and the government was ineffective. He was Minister of Defense from April 1949 to September 1950.

=== Interim prime minister ===
He was asked to serve as interim prime minister from 28 October 1958 by U Nu, when the AFPFL split into two factions and U Nu barely survived a motion of no-confidence against his government in parliament. Ne Win restored order during the period known as the "Ne Win caretaker government". Elections were held in February 1960 and Ne Win handed back power to the victorious U Nu on 4 April 1960.

== Military coup of 1962 ==
On 2 March 1962, Ne Win again seized power in a coup d'état. He became head of state as Chairman of the Union Revolutionary Council and also Prime Minister and Minister of Defense. The coup was characterized as "bloodless" by the world's media. Declaring that "parliamentary democracy was not suitable for Burma," the new regime suspended the constitution and dissolved the legislature.

Following riots at Rangoon University in July 1962, troops were sent to restore order. They fired on protesters and destroyed the student union building.

Shortly afterward, around 8 pm local time, Ne Win addressed the nation in a five-minute radio speech which concluded with the statement: "If these disturbances were made to challenge us, I have to declare that we will fight sword with sword and spear with spear". On 13 July 1962, less than a week after the speech, Ne Win left for Austria, Switzerland and the United Kingdom "for a medical check up". All universities were closed for more than two years until September 1964.

In 1988, 26 years later, Ne Win denied involvement in the dynamiting of the Student Union building, stating that his deputy Brigadier Aung Gyi – who by that time had fallen out with Ne Win and been dismissed – had given the order and that he had to take responsibility as a "revolutionary leader" by giving the sword with sword and spear with spear speech.

== Burmese Way to Socialism (1962–1988) ==
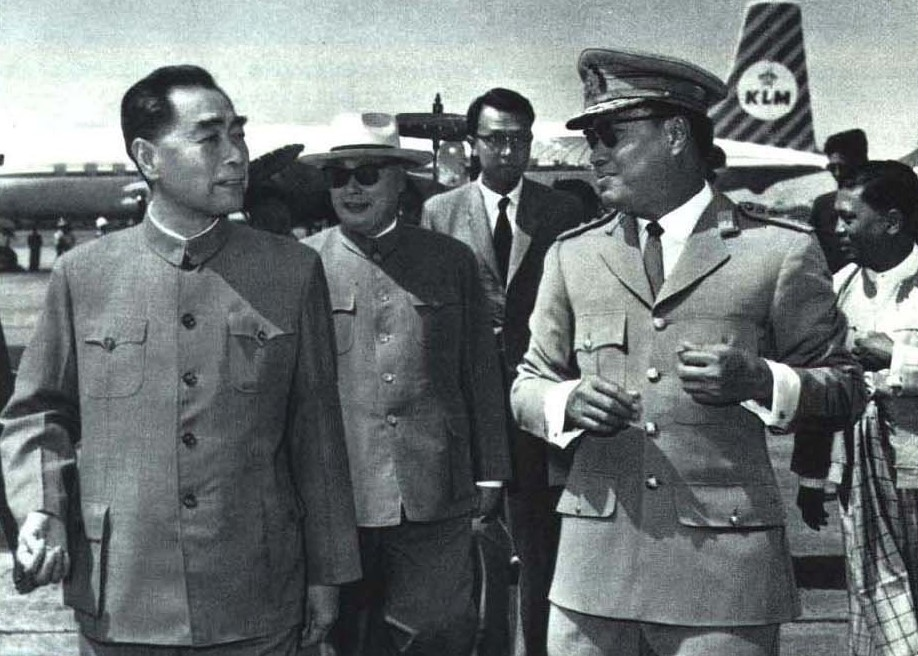
Ne Win with Zhou Enlai and Chen Yi during their visit to Burma on 31 May 1964

Ne Win oversaw a number of reforms after taking power. The administration instituted a system including elements of nationalism, Marxism, and Buddhism, though Ne Win lacked interest in either ideology or religion – terming this the Burmese Way to Socialism. He founded the Burma Socialist Programme Party (BSPP), which in 1964 was formally declared to be the only legal party.

Following the 1962 coup, Ne Win's government began implementing policies highlighting the centrality of Burmese language, Burmese culture, and Burmese Buddhism to the unity of the country. Such policies focused on the school curriculum, military recruitment, and the advancement of Burmese-centric popular culture. Ethnic schools and hospitals were nationalized, and new staff assigned from Rangoon. When ethnic minority areas did not comply, the communities were attacked by the military. Collectively these policies later became known as General Ne Win's "Burmanization" policies.

A system of state hospitals and institutions was established in Burma; medical care was free. Private hospitals were brought under public ownership. A new system of public education was introduced. A campaign to liquidate illiteracy was carried out starting in 1965. Between 1962 and 1965 important laws against landlords and usury were adopted. They aimed at protecting peasants' rights to land and property and to renting the land. These measures included the law abolishing rents on land.

On 2 March 1974, he disbanded the Revolutionary Council and proclaimed the Socialist Republic of the Union of Burma. He was elected president of Myanmar and shortly afterward appointed Brigadier General Sein Win as Prime Minister. On 9 November 1981, Ne Win resigned as president and was succeeded in that post by General San Yu. However, Ne Win remained leader of the party and thus remained the ultimate political authority in the land until his resignation in 1988.

=== Economic policies ===
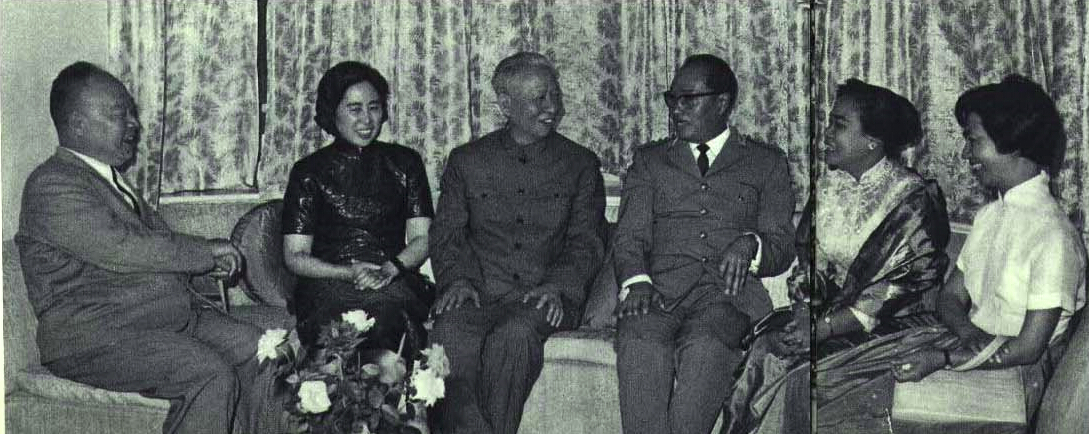
Ne Win with Chinese president Liu Shaoqi in June 1966

Ne Win's government nationalized the economy and pursued a policy of autarky, which involved the economic isolation of Burma from the world. The ubiquitous black market and rampant smuggling supplied the needs of the people, while the central government slid slowly into bankruptcy. Autarky also involved expelling foreigners and restricting visits by foreigners to three days, and after 1972, one week. The Burmanization of the economy included the expulsion of many Chinese (along with Indians). Ne Win's government prohibited foreigners from owning land and practicing certain professions. Even foreign aid organizations were banned; the only humanitarian aid permitted was on an intergovernmental basis. Furthermore, heavy-handed political oppression caused many in the educated workforce to emigrate.

Ne Win also took drastic steps regarding the currency. In 1985, he issued a decree that 25, 35, and 75 kyat notes would cease to be legal tender, alleging that they were subject to hoarding by black-marketeers and were also used to finance the various insurgencies. Though limited compensation was offered, this wiped out people's savings overnight. At least one insurgency, that of the ethnic Kayan, was triggered by this act.

In 1987, reportedly on the recommendation of an astrologer that the number nine was auspicious, Ne Win ordered the withdrawal of several large-denomination kyat notes while issuing new denominations of 45 and 90 kyats. Both 45 and 90 are divisible by nine, and their digits add up to nine. Again, millions of Burmese lost their life savings, and the demonetization also rendered about 75% of the entire kyat reserves completely useless. This crippled the Burmese economy further still. Ne Win was well known for his penchant for yadaya (traditional Burmese rituals performed in order to ward off misfortune). When his soothsayer warned him that there might be a bloodbath, he would stand in front of a mirror and trample on meat to simulate the blood, then shoot his reflection to avert the possibility of an assassination attempt. He also ordered the parliament to eat mohinga for three days in a row to ward off national poverty, abandoned a 1984 state visit to France after seeing a motorcycle accident involving a group member as a bad omen, often dressed as a king while in one Rangoon neighborhood, and also frequently walked backward over bridges at night.

Ne Win resigned as chairman of the ruling Burma Socialist Programme Party on 23 July 1988 at the height of the uprising against his regime, and roughly one year after the United Nations declared Burma a "Least Developed Country".

=== Student and worker riots ===
Sporadic protests against the government continued. Students led protests in 1965, December 1969, and December 1970. These demonstrations took place mainly on campuses located in the cities of Rangoon, Mandalay and Moulmein and were often followed by the closure of universities and colleges. In June 1974, workers from more than 100 factories throughout the nation participated in a strike, to which the government reacted by shooting about 100 workers and students on 6 June 1974 at the Thamaing Textile Factory and the Sinmalaik Dock Yard in Rangoon. Since Ne Win was in Australia on an official visit at the time, responsibility for these shootings is unclear. On 5 December 1974, students turned the funeral of former UN Secretary General U Thant into a demonstration, snatching the coffin on display at the Kyaikkasan Race Course and erecting a makeshift mausoleum on the grounds of the former Student Union building in protest against the government for not honouring their famous countryman with a state funeral. The military stormed the campus on 11 December, killing some of the students, recovered the coffin and buried U Thant at the foot of the Shwedagon pagoda, next to the tomb of Thakin Kodaw Hmaing.

=== 1967 anti-Chinese riots ===
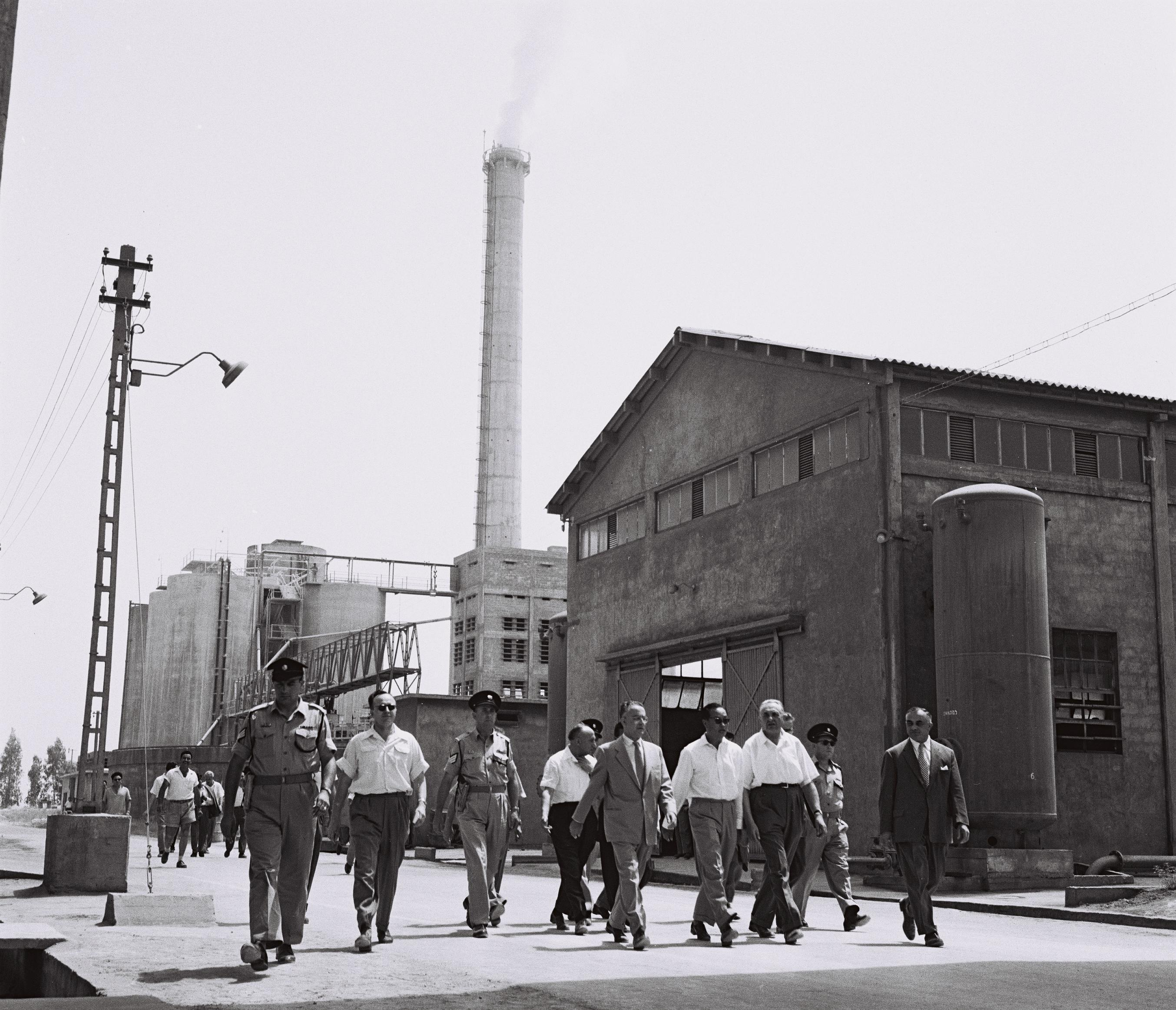
Gen. Ne Win, Burmese P.M, touring the Nesher Cement Factory in Ramleh.

In February 1963, the Enterprise Nationalization Law was passed, effectively nationalizing all major industries and prohibiting the formation of new factories. This law adversely affected many industrialists and entrepreneurs, especially those without full citizenship. The government's economic nationalization program further prohibited foreigners, including the non-citizen Chinese, from owning land, sending remittances, getting business licenses and practicing medicine. Such policies led to the beginnings of a major exodus of Burmese Chinese to other countries – some 100,000 Chinese left Burma.

Since Ne Win made Burmese the medium of instruction, many Chinese-language schools had to be closed. When the Chinese embassy in Rangoon distributed Mao's red books in Burma, many Chinese went out on the streets in support of the Cultural Revolution. They were attacked by Burmese citizens, the most violent riots taking place in 1967. Beginning in 1967 and continuing throughout the 1970s, anti-Chinese riots continued to flare up, as many elements in Burma tried to spread the Cultural Revolution. Many believed they were covertly supported by the government. Similarly, Chinese shops were looted and set on fire. Public attention was successfully diverted by Ne Win from the uncontrollable inflation, scarcity of consumer items and rising prices of rice. The 1982 Citizenship Law further restricted Burmese citizenship for Burmese Chinese (as it stratified citizenship into three categories: full, associate, and naturalized) and severely limited Burmese Chinese, especially those without full citizenship and holders of Certificates of Registration, from attending professional tertiary schools, including medical, engineering, agricultural and economics institutions. During this period, the country's failing economy and widespread discrimination accelerated an emigration of Burmese Chinese out of Burma.

== 8888 Uprising, resignation, and military coup (1975–1988) ==
Students from universities throughout Rangoon demonstrated again in June 1975 in commemoration of the previous year's Labour Strike. Student-led demonstrations also occurred in March 1976, September 1987, March and June 1988. In August and September 1988, these demonstrations turned into a nationwide uprising against BSPP rule in what is now known as the 'Four Eights Uprising'.

The 8888 uprising was started by students in Yangon (Rangoon) on 8 August 1988. Student protests spread throughout the country. Hundreds of thousands of monks, children, university students, housewives, doctors and common people protested against the government. The uprising ended on 18 September after a bloody military coup by the State Law and Order Restoration Council (SLORC). Thousands of deaths have been attributed to the military during this uprising, while authorities in Myanmar put the figure at around 350 people killed.

At the height of the Four Eights Uprising against the BSPP, Ne Win resigned as party chairman on 23 July 1988. In a truculent farewell speech to the BSPP Party Congress, he warned that if the "disturbances" continued the "army would have to be called and I would like to declare from here that if the army shoots it has no tradition of shooting into the air. It would shoot straight to hit." The Tatmadaw troops shot, killed and maimed hundreds if not up to 3,000 or more demonstrators in various places throughout Burma from the period of 8 to 12 August 1988 and again on 18 September 1988, proving that Ne Win's farewell speech was not an empty threat.

On 18 September 1988 the military led by Senior General Saw Maung dispelled any hopes for democracy by brutally crushing the uprisings. It is widely believed that Ne Win, though in apparent retirement, orchestrated the coup from behind the scenes.

For about ten years, Ne Win kept a low profile but remained a shadowy figure exercising at least some influence on the military junta. After 1998, Ne Win's influence on the junta began to wane.

== Death and funeral ==
Still under house arrest, Ne Win died on 5 December 2002 at his lakeside house in Yangon. The death remained unannounced by Burmese media or the junta. The only mention of Ne Win's death was a paid obituary notice that appeared in some of the government-controlled Burmese language newspapers. Ne Win was not given a state funeral, and his former contacts or junior colleagues were strongly discouraged from attending a hastily arranged funeral, so that only thirty people attended the funeral.

Ne Win's daughter Sandar Win was temporarily released from house arrest to attend his funeral and cremation. She later dispersed her father's ashes into the Hlaing River.

Ne Win's grandson Aye Ne Win and Kyaw Ne Win were released in 2013.

== Family ==
Ne Win was married six times:

1. He was first married to Daw Than Nyunt, who bore him a son, Kyaw Thein.
2. He was second married to Tin Tin, who bore him two sons, Ngwe Soe and Aye Aung.
3. He then married Khin May Than (Katie Ba Than), daughter of Professor Ba Than, the former dean of Rangoon medical school. The couple had two daughters and a son between them, Sandar Win, Kye Mon Win, and Phyo Wai Win. Khin May Than brought three daughters from her first marriage, Le Le Win and twins Thida Win and Thawdar Win, into the family. Khin May Than was Ne Win's favourite wife and her death in 1972 was a heavy blow to him.
4. He then married Ni Ni Myint, a university teacher, whom he divorced.
5. He then married June Rose Bellamy (Yadana Nat-mei), a great granddaughter of Crown Prince Ka Naung.
6. He remarried his former wife Ni Ni Myint.

== Honours and awards ==
- Agga Maha Thray Sithu (Note: Grand Commander of the Order of the Union of Burma) (Myanmar)
- Member of the Order of the Rajamitrabhorn (Thailand)
- Bintang Jasa Utama (Note: Star of Service (1st class)) (Indonesia)
- Order of the Yugoslav Great Star (Yugoslavia)

== General bibliography ==
- Can-pati, Mranmā (1965). Party Seminar 1965: Speeches of Chairman General Ne Win and Political Report of the General Secretary. Yangon, Burma: Burma Socialist Programme Party. ISBN 978-87-7694-088-1. Archived from the original on 18 March 2022.
- Maung, Maung (1965). Burma and General Ne Win. University of Michigan: Religious Affairs Department Press.
- Mya, Doung Nyo (1992). The Thirty Comrades. Myanmar: Guardian Press. Archived from the original on 18 March 2022.
- Taylor, Robert (2015). General Ne Win: A Political Biography. Institute of Southeast Asian Studies. ISBN 978-9814620130.
- Yawnghwe, Tzang (1990). Ne Win's Tatmadaw Dictatorship. Hurst. ISBN 9814620130. Archived from the original on 25 March 2022.
- Saw Eh Htoo and Tony Waters (2024). General Ne Win’s Legacy of Burmanization in Myanmar: The Challenge to Peace in the Twenty-First Century. Singapore: Palgrave MacMillan.

Political offices
Preceded by U Nu	Prime Minister of Burma; Acting; 1958–1960	Succeeded by U Nu
Preceded by Win Maung as President	Chairman of the Revolutionary Council of the Union of Burma; 1962–1974	Succeeded by Himself as President
Preceded by U Nu as Prime Minister	Chairman of the Revolutionary Government of the Union of Burma; 1962–1974	Succeeded by Sein Win as Prime Minister
Preceded by Himself as Chairman of the Revolutionary Council	Chairman of the Council of State and President of Burma; 1974–1981	Succeeded by San Yu
Party political offices
Preceded by None	Chairman of the Burma Socialist Programme Party; 1962–1988	Succeeded by Sein Lwin
Military offices
Preceded by Smith Dun	General Officer Commanding Burma Army; After 1955 Chief of Staff of Defence Services; 1949–1972	Succeeded by San Yu
