= Paungdale =

Paungdale ပေါင်းတလည်
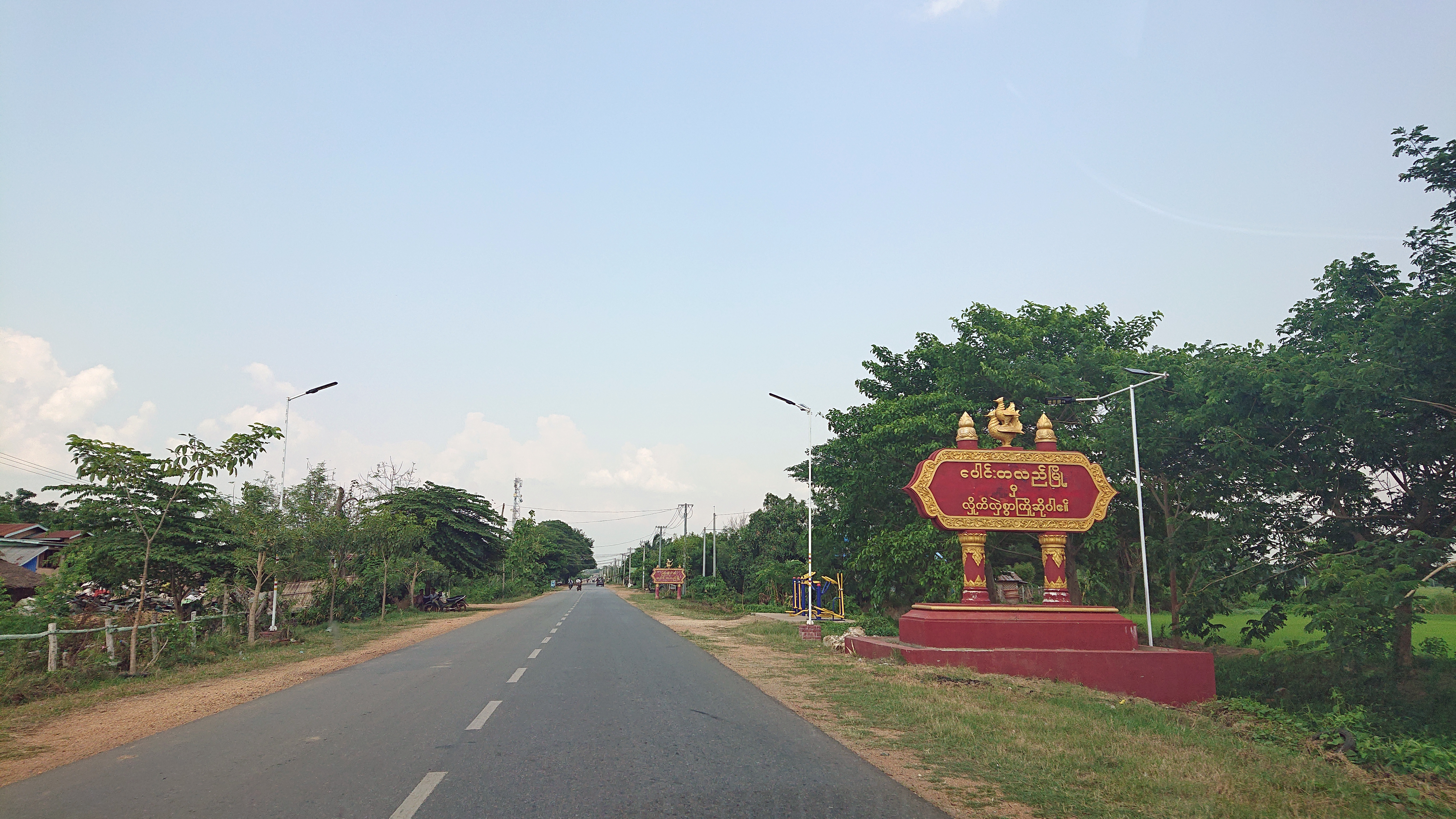
- Entrance

- Location within Myanmar
- Coordinates: 18°51′N 95°23′E
- Country: Myanmar
- Region: Bago Region
- District: Pyay District
- Township: Pyay Township
- Time zone: UTC+6.30 (MMT)

Paungdale is a small town located within Pyay District, Bago Region of Myanmar. It is about 12 miles from Pyay and 13 miles from Pauk Khaung. Notable people from Paungdale include Ne Win and Tekkatho Phone Naing.
