= List of beaches =

This is a list of beaches of the world, sorted by country. A beach is a landform along the shoreline of an ocean, sea, lake, or river. It usually consists of loose particles, which are often composed of rock, such as sand, gravel, shingle, pebbles, or cobblestones. Beaches typically occur in areas along the coast where wave or current action deposits and reworks sediments. The particles comprising a beach are occasionally biological in origin, such as mollusc shells or coralline algae.

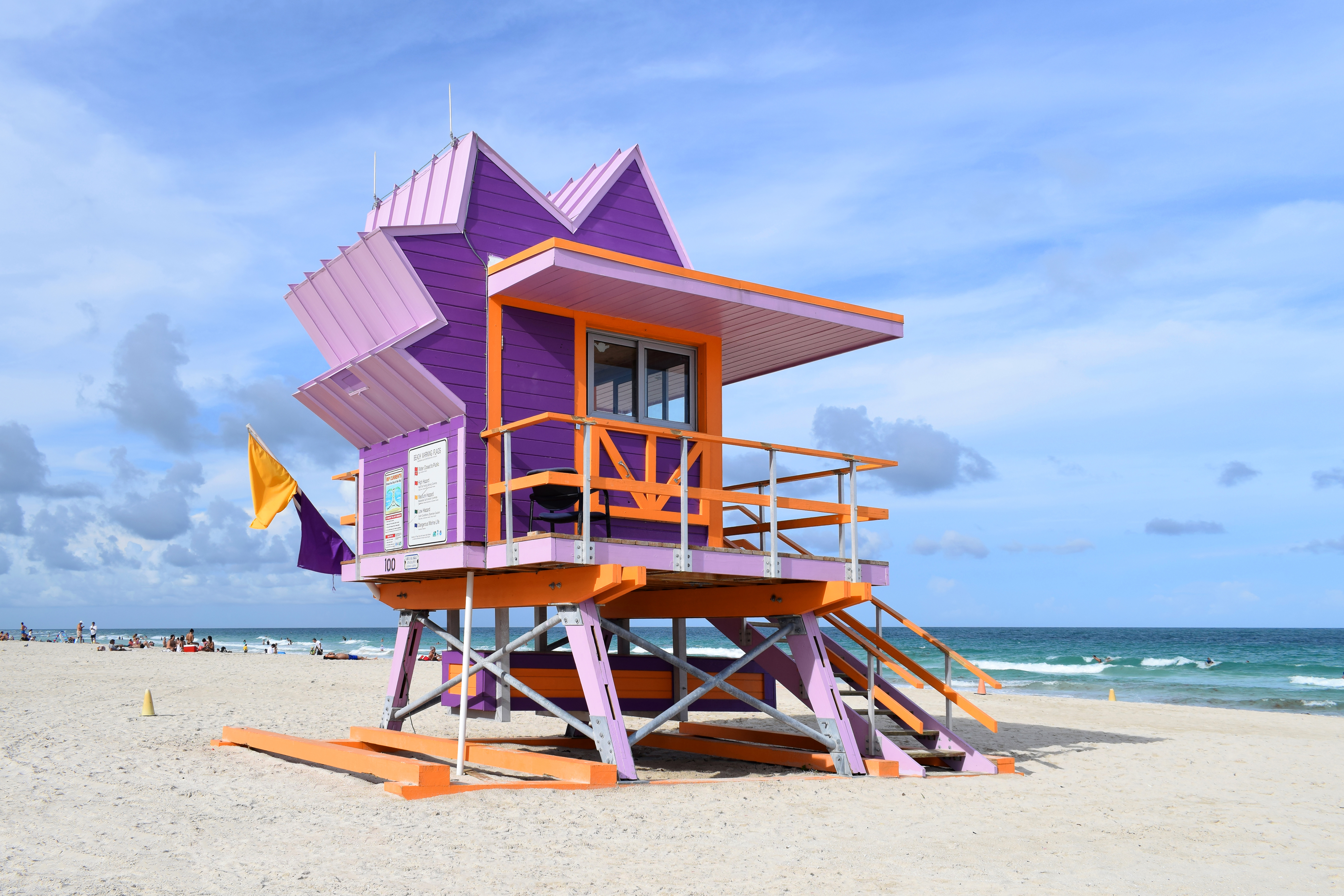
A lifeguard tower at Miami Beach, the most popular beach in the world.

== Afghanistan ==
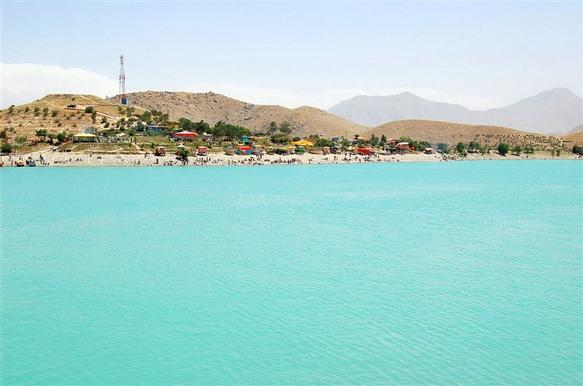
Qargha Reservoir in Afghanistan

- Qargha Reservoir

== Algeria ==
- Beni Haoua Beach

== Angola ==
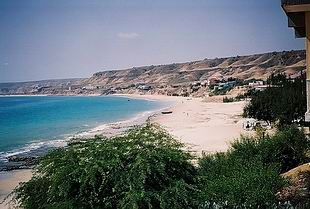
Baía Azul in Angola

- Baía Azul
- Coatinha beach in Benguela
- Mussulo beach in Luanda
- Praia Do Cangulo in Namibe

== Antigua and Barbuda ==
There are 365 beaches on Antigua. The following are some of beaches in Antigua and Barbuda:

- Cocoa Point beach, Barbuda, 17°32′59″N 61°45′58″W
- Devil's Bridge beach, Saint Philip, Antigua and Barbuda, 17°06′00″N 61°41′00″W
- Eden beach, near Five Islands, Antigua, 17°06′36″N 61°54′04″W
- Five Islands beach, Antigua
- Galleon beach, 17°00′41″N 61°45′37″W
- Half Moon Bay, SE coast, Antigua
- Jolly beach, Saint Mary, Antigua 17°04′10″N 61°53′23″W
- Little Ffryes Beach, Antigua
- Pigeon cliff beach, Barbuda, 17°38′40″N 61°44′49″W
- Pink sand beach, Barbuda, 17°35′32″N 61°49′26″W
- Runaway Beach, Dickenson Bay, Runaway Bay, Antigua17°08′43″N 61°51′32″W

== Argentina ==
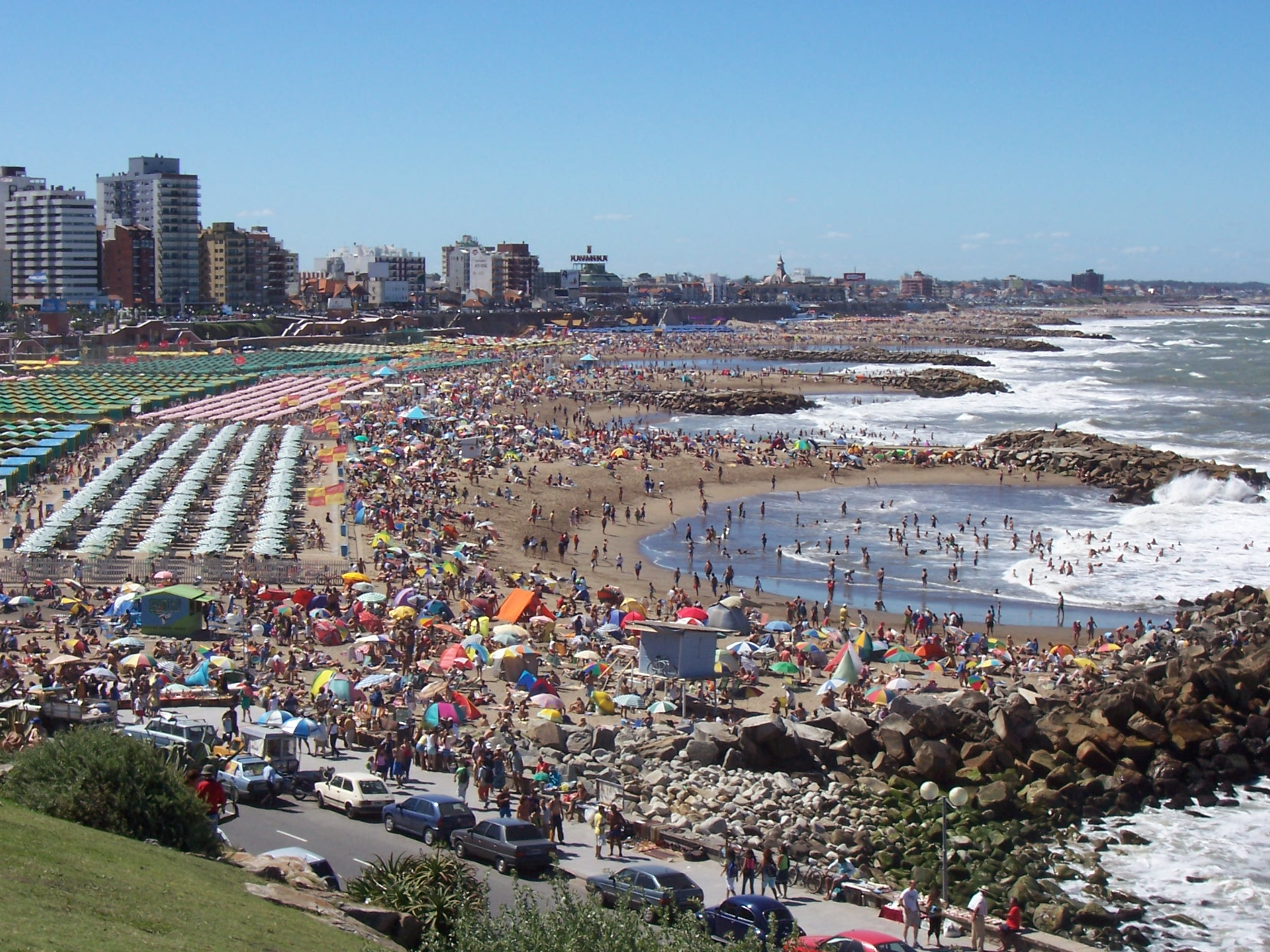
One of the beaches of Mar del Plata, Argentina during summer tourism season

- Cariló
- Las Grutas
- Mar de las Pampas
- Mar del Plata
- Mar del Sur
- Miramar
- Monte Hermoso
- Necochea
- Pinarmar
- Playa Union
- Puerto Madryn
- Puerto Piramides
- Rada Tilly
- San Clemente del Tuyú
- Villa Gesell

Source: Argentina's Travel Guide — Beaches

== Armenia ==
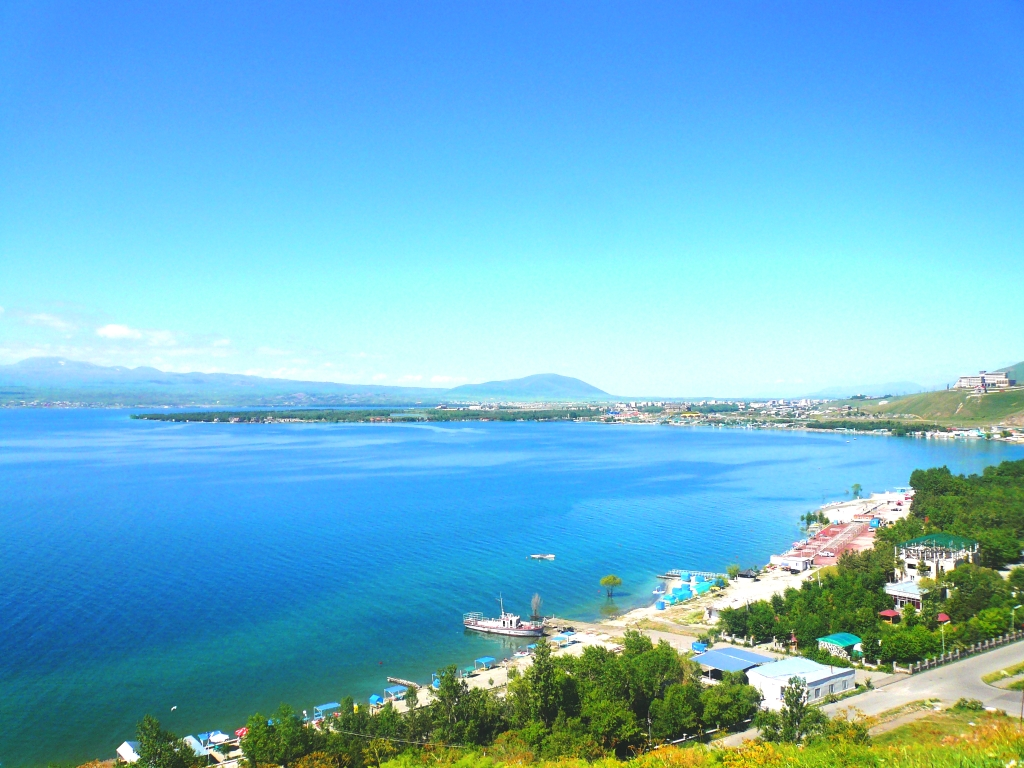
Sevan beach

- Sevan

== Australia ==
=== New South Wales ===
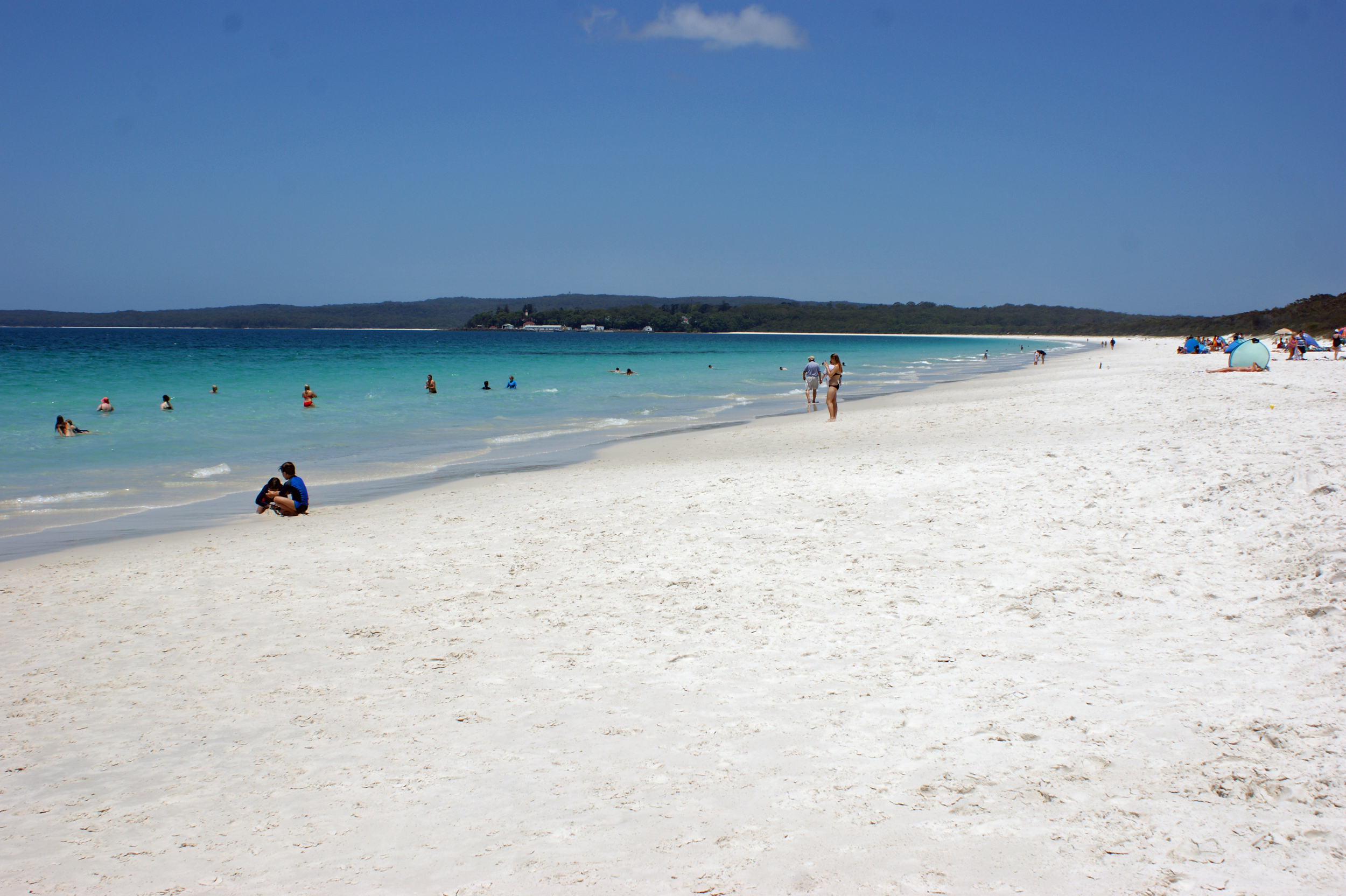
Hyams Beach in Jervis Bay, which features white sand.

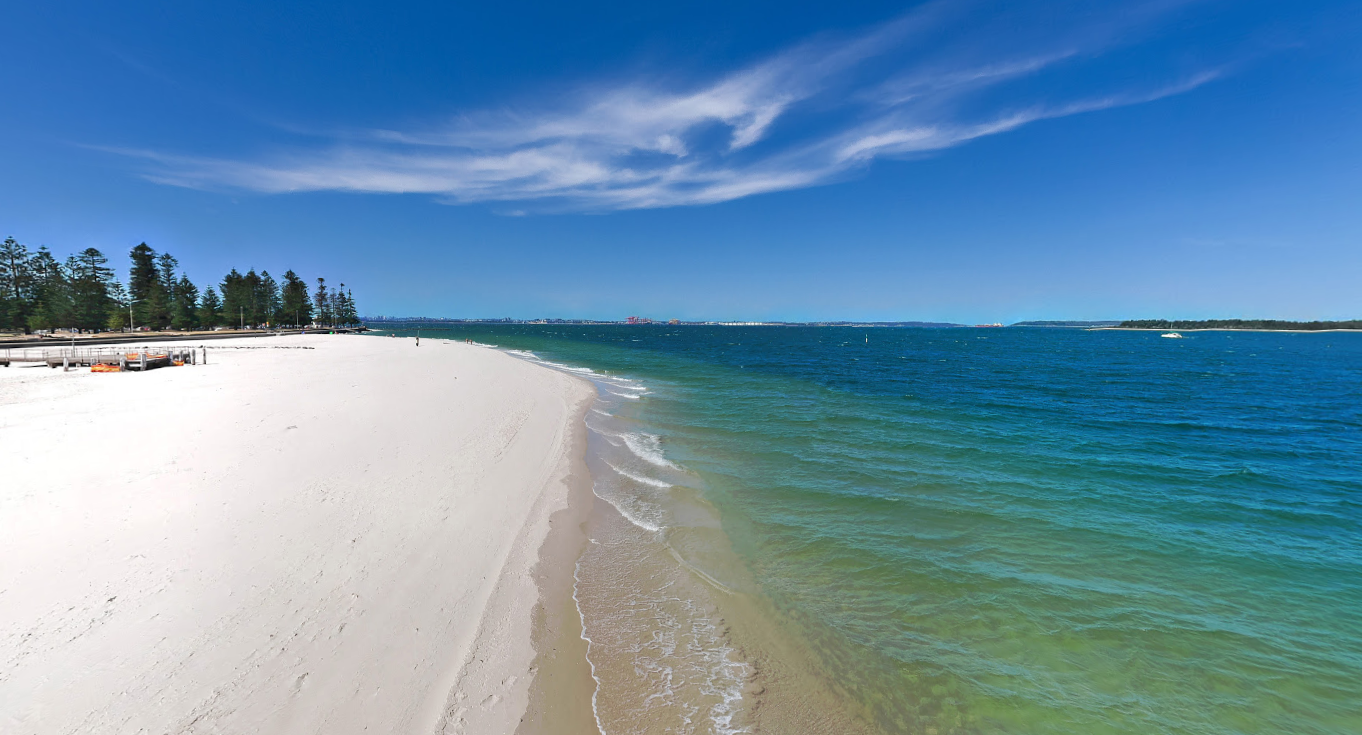
Lady Robinsons Beach in Dolls Point, Sydney.

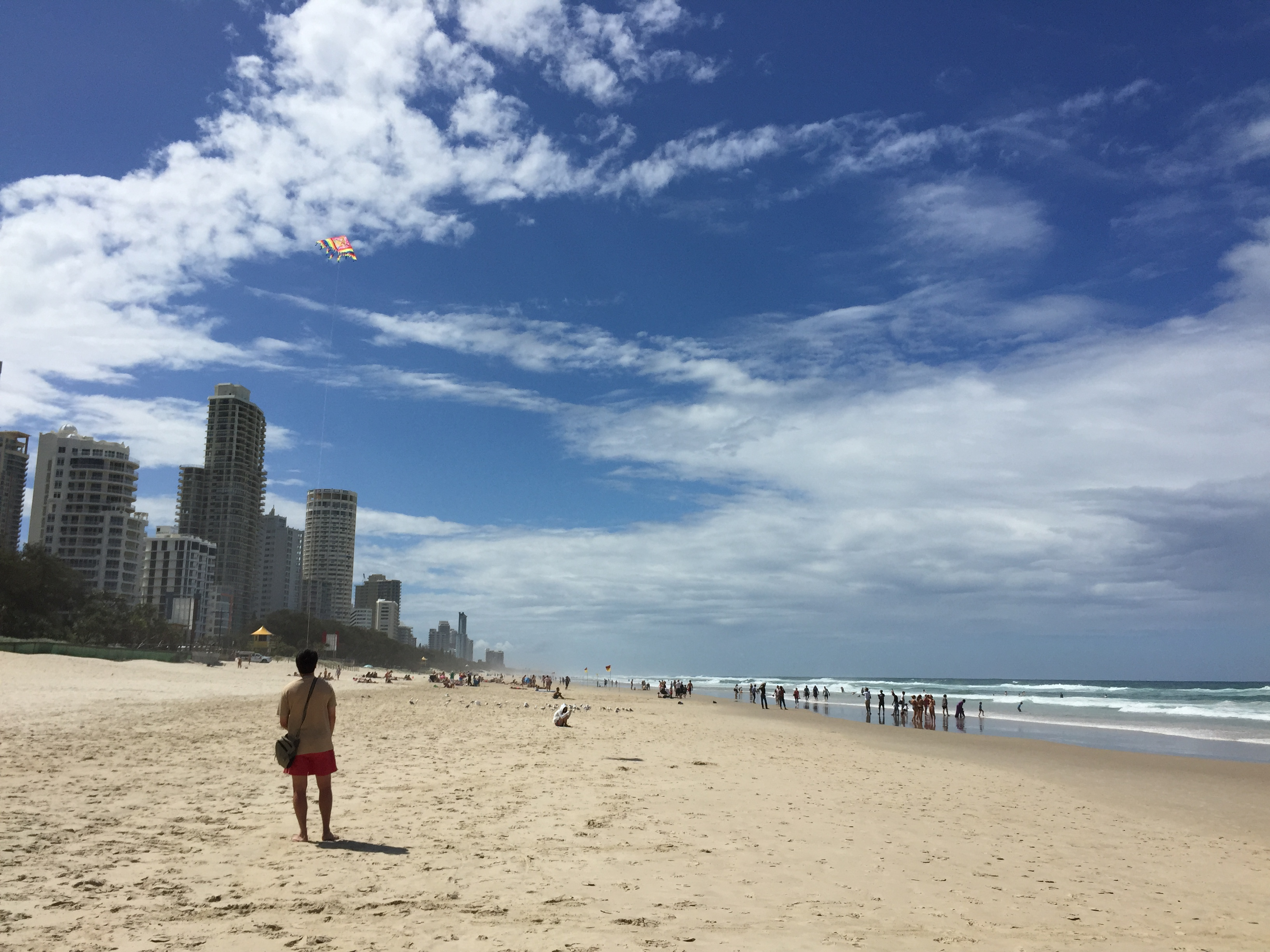
Surfers Paradise, Queensland.

- Avalon Beach (Northern Beaches)
- Bondi Beach
- Bronte Beach
- Coogee Beach
- Cronulla Beach
- Dee Why Beach
- Lady Robinsons Beach
- Manly Beach
- Maroubra Beach
- Palm Beach
- Tamarama
- Hyams Beach
- Duranbah Beach, Tweed Heads
- Byron Bay
- Casuarina Beach, Tweed Heads
- Central Coast

=== Northern Territory ===
- Mindil Beach, Northern Territory

=== Queensland ===
- Coolangatta, southern Gold Coast
- Four Mile Beach
- Gold Coast, Queensland
- Mermaid Beach, Gold Coast
- Mooloolaba, Sunshine Coast
- Palm Cove
- Rainbow Beach
- Shark Island, Cronulla Beach
- Sunrise Beach
- Sunshine Beach
- Surfers Paradise, Gold Coast
- Trinity Beach
- Whitehaven Beach

=== South Australia ===
- Aldinga Beach
- Baudin Beach
- Christies Beach
- The Coorong, the longest in Australia
- Henley Beach
- Island Beach
- Maslin Beach
- Middle Beach
- O'Sullivan Beach
- Sellicks Beach
- West Beach

=== Victoria ===
- Addiscot Beach
- Bancoora Beach
- Bells Beach, Torquay
- Bridgewater Bay
- Discovery Bay
- Jan Juc Beach
- Lorne
- Mattsass Beach
- Ninety Mile Beach
- Sunnymead Beach
- Thirteenth Beach
- Torquay Front Beach
- Torquay Surf Beach

=== Western Australia ===
- Cable Beach
- Eighty Mile Beach
- Lucky Bay
- Cottesloe Beach, Cottesloe

== Azerbaijan ==
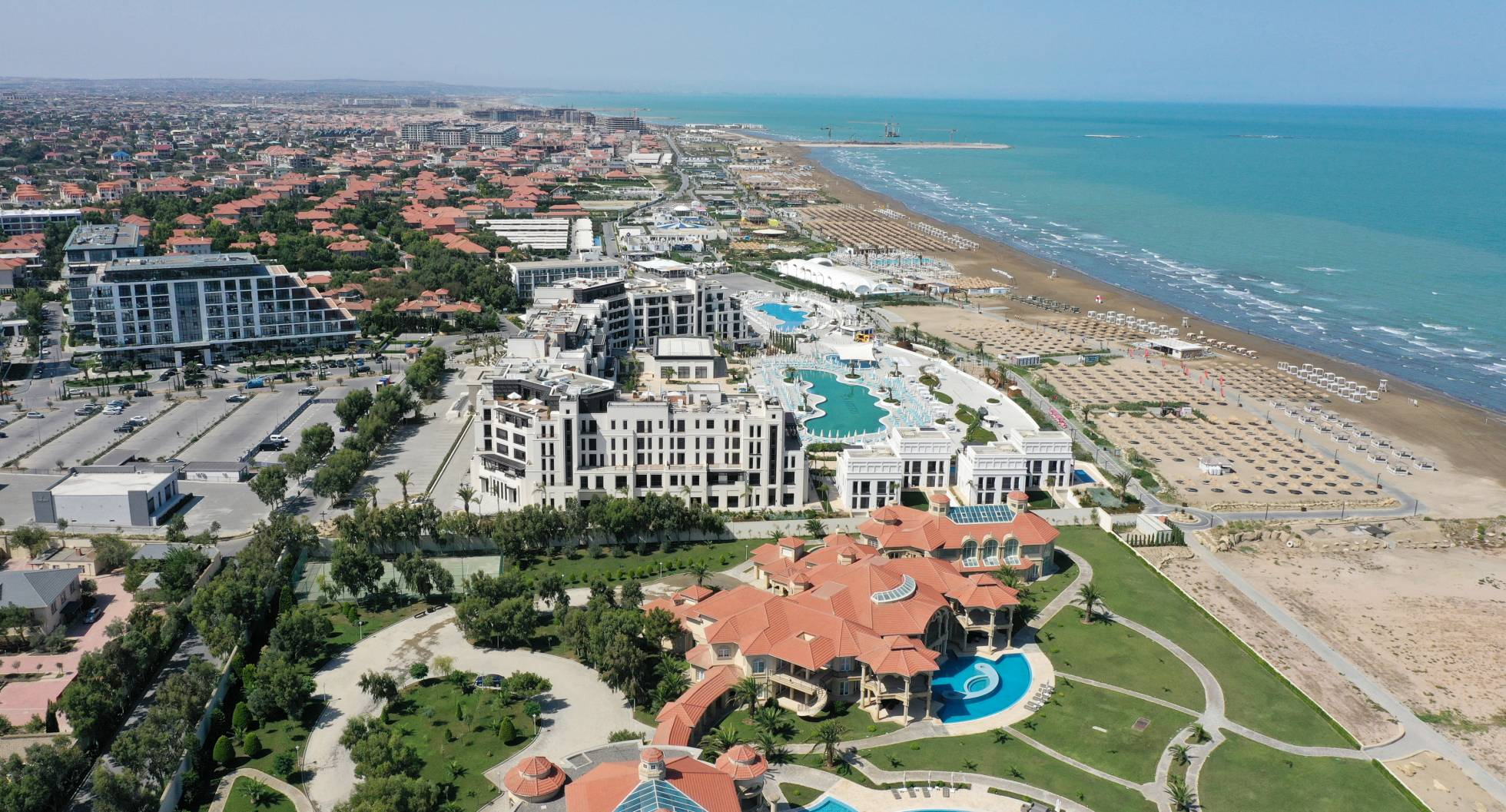
Sea Breeze resort in Baku, Azerbaijan

- Astara, Azerbaijan
- Bilgah
- Nabran
- Novkhani
- Pirşağı
- Shikhov Beach
- Zağulba Bağları

== Bahamas ==
- Paradise Island
- Cabbage Beach
- Junknaoo Beach
- Jaws Beach
- Love Beach / Nirvana
- Goodman's Bay
- Saunder's Beach
- Montague Beach
- Cable Beach / Caves
- Blue Lagoon Island
- Western Esplanade Beach
- Sandyport Beach
- Yamacraw Beach
- Coral Harbour Beach
- Adelaide

== Bangladesh ==
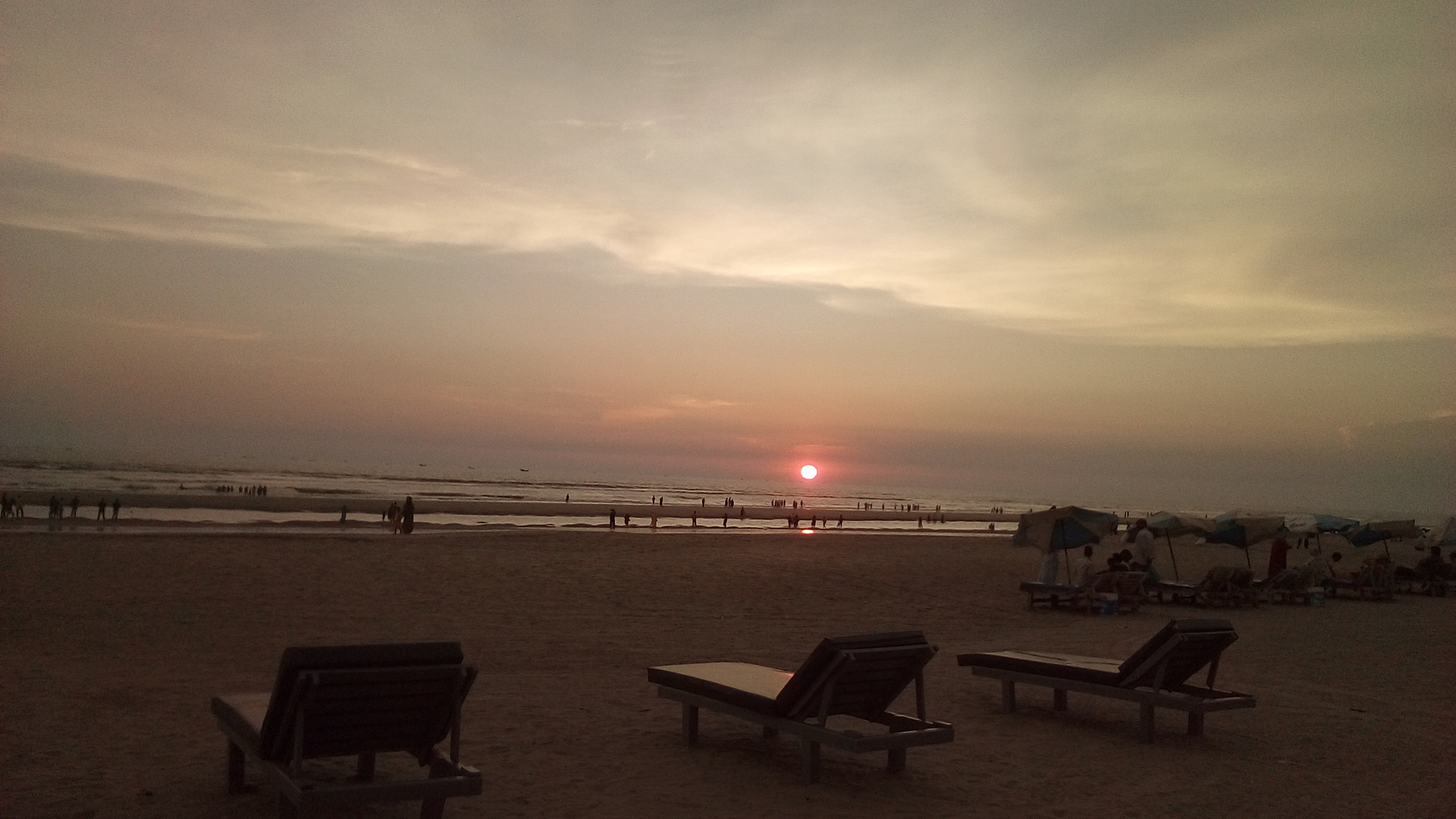
Cox's Bazar, Bangladesh, the longest beach in the world

== Belgium ==
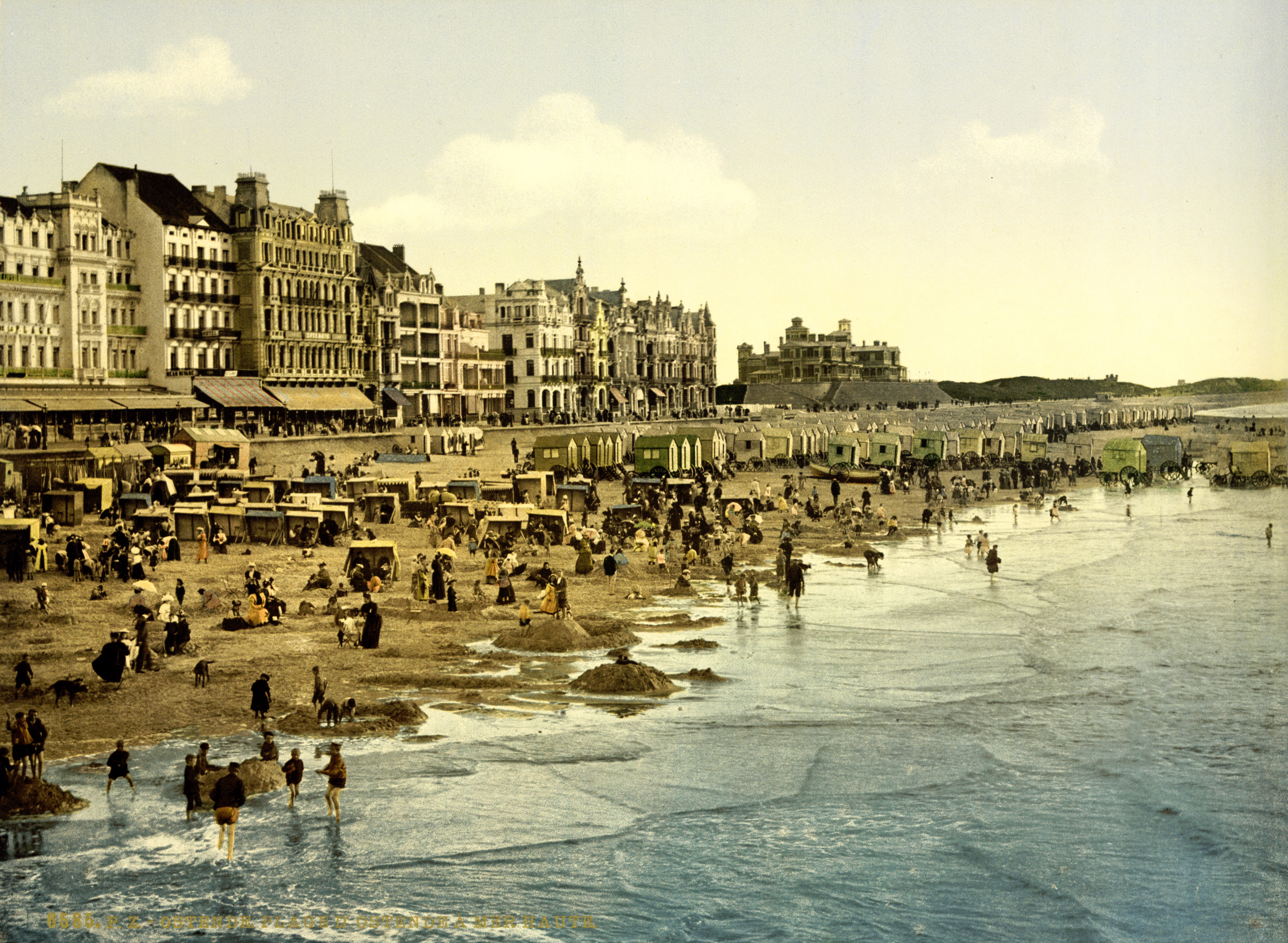
Ostend Beach in Belgium in 1895

== Belize ==
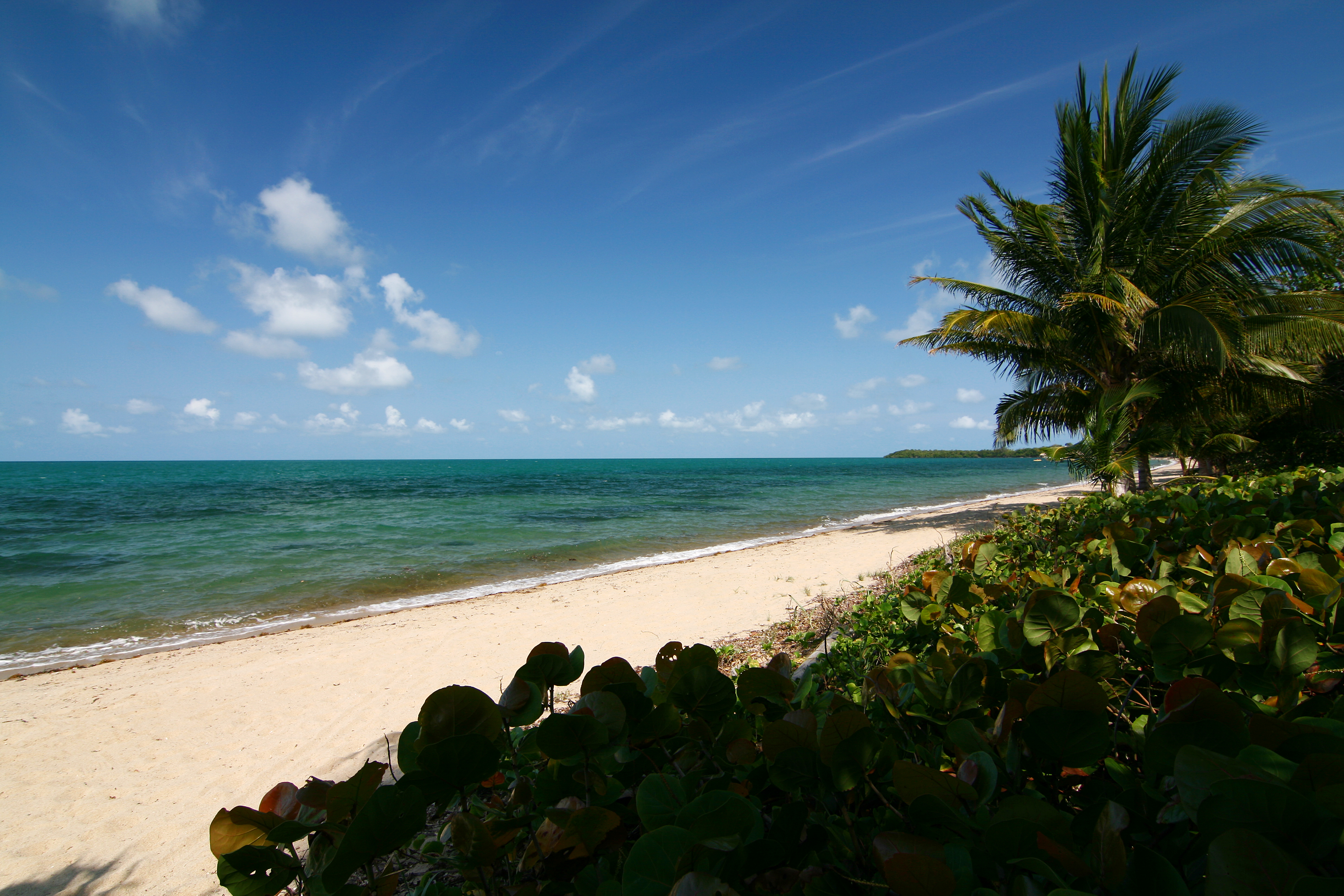
Almond Beach, Belize

Mainland beaches

- Cerros Beach (a mini Tulum)
- Gales Point Lagoon
- Almond Beach, Hopkins
- Honey Camp Lagoon
- Maya Beach, Placencia
- Monkey River Beach
- Sarteneja

Popular cayes

- Blackadore Caye
- Caye Caulker
- Caye Chapel
- Goff's Caye
- Half Moon Caye
- Laughing Bird Caye
- St. George's Caye
- San Pedro Town, Ambergris Caye
- Sapodilla Cayes
- Tobacco Caye

== Brazil ==
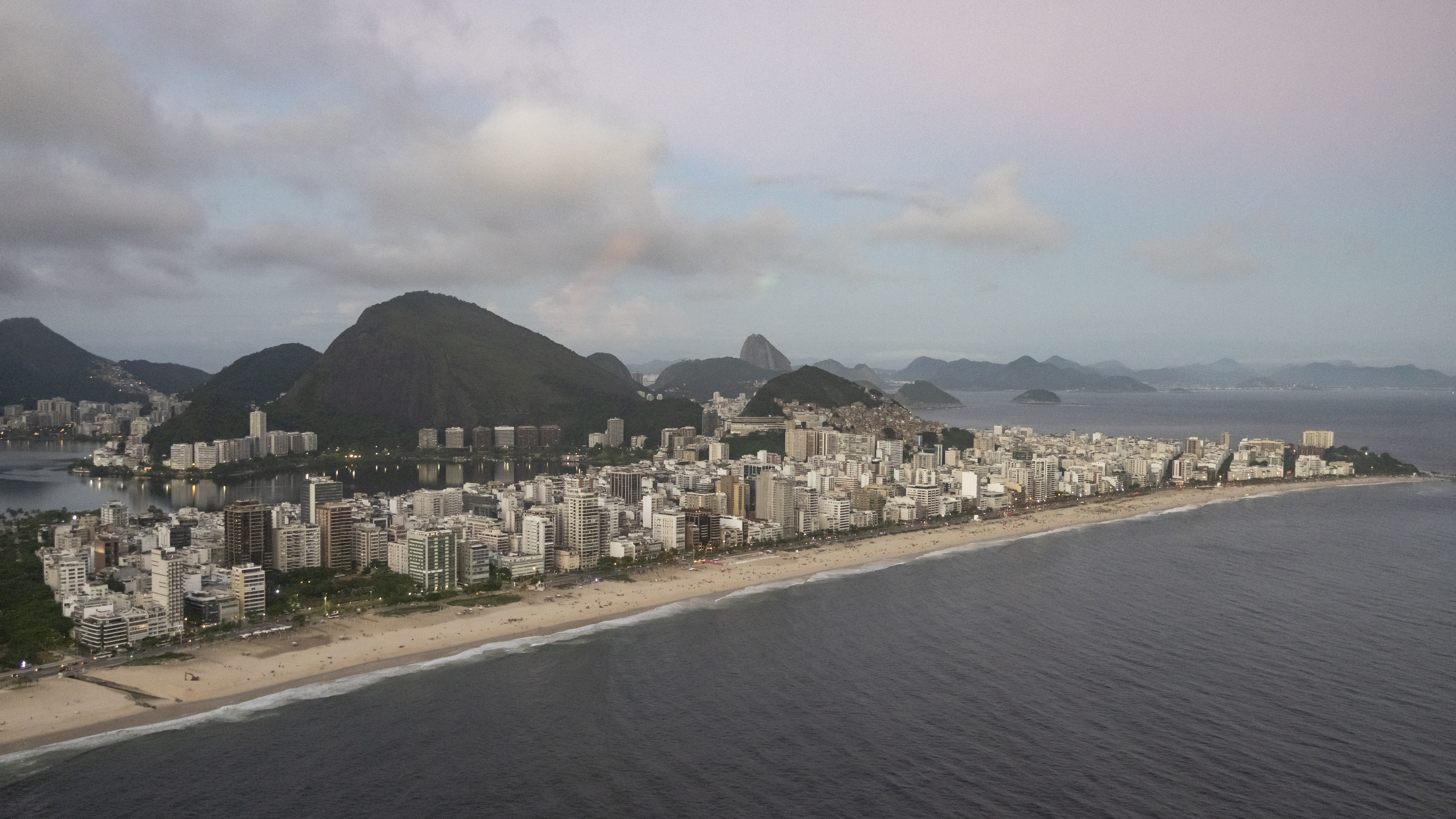
Ipanema is one of the most famous beaches in the world.

== Brunei ==
- Muara beach

== Bulgaria ==
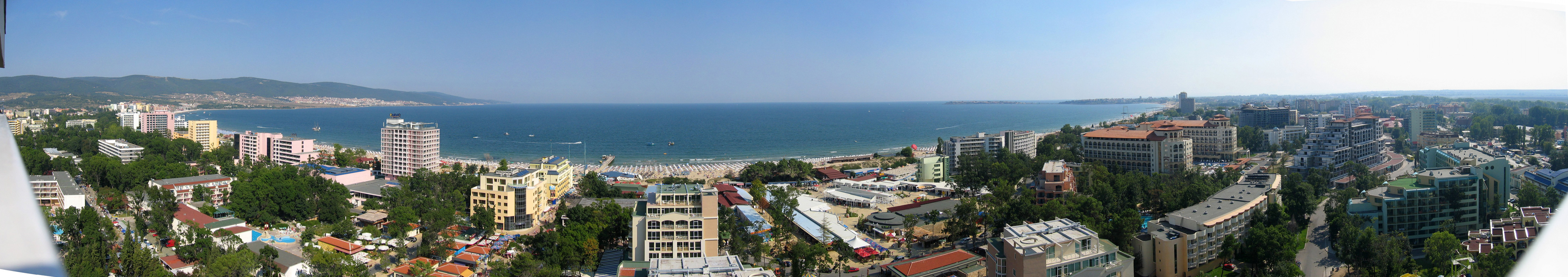
A panorama image of Sunny Beach, Bulgaria

- Albena
- Bolata
- Golden Sands
- Sunny Beach

== Cambodia ==
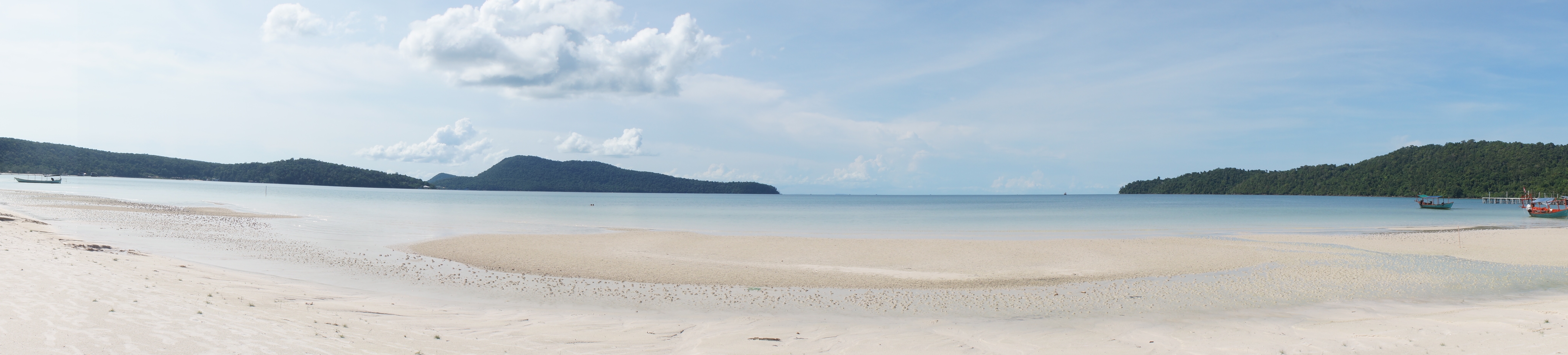
Koh Rong Sanloem, Cambodia

- Sihanoukville Beaches
- Sihanoukville Island Beaches

== Cameroon ==
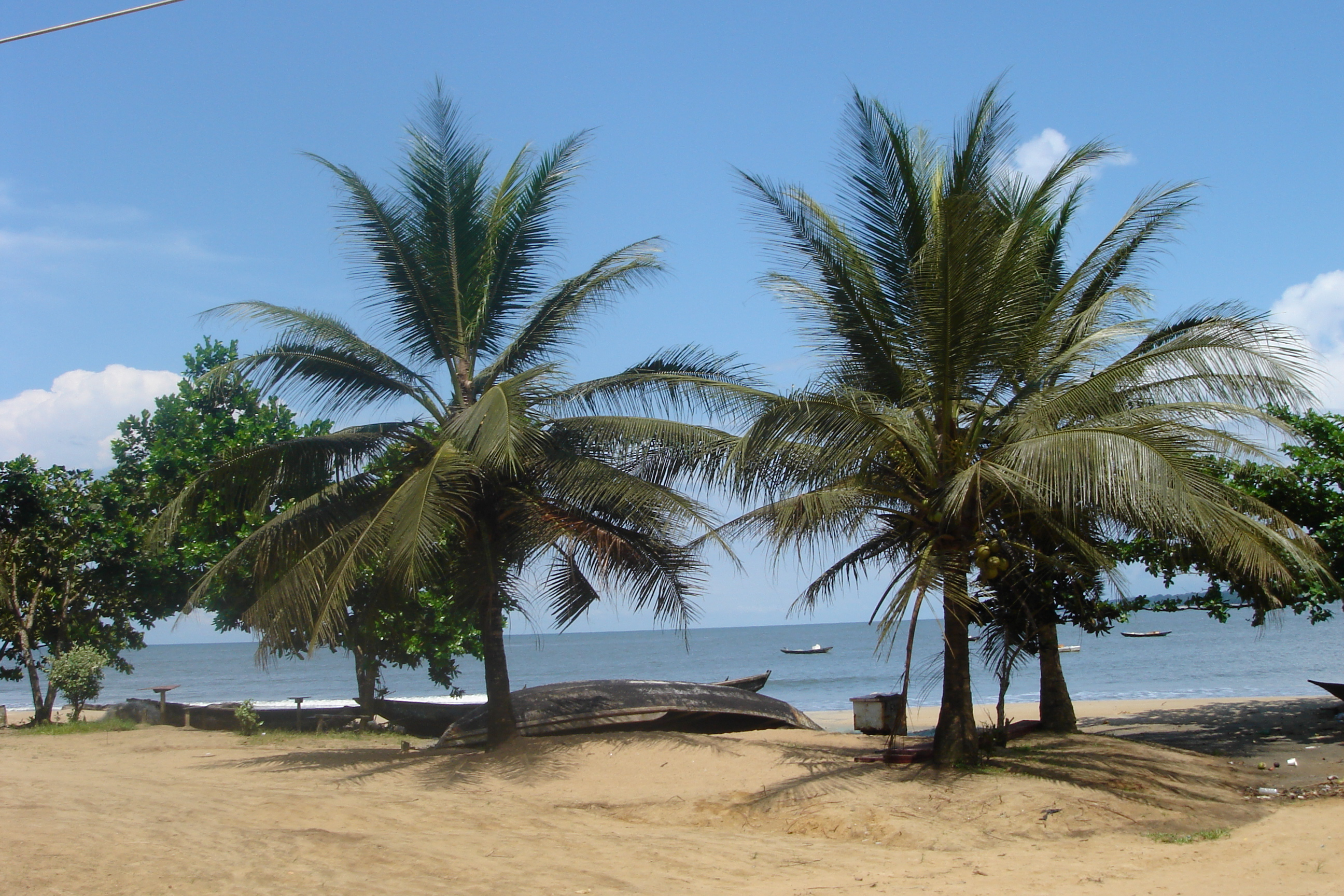
Kribi beach, Cameroon

- Kribi Beach
- Limbe Beach

== Cape Verde ==
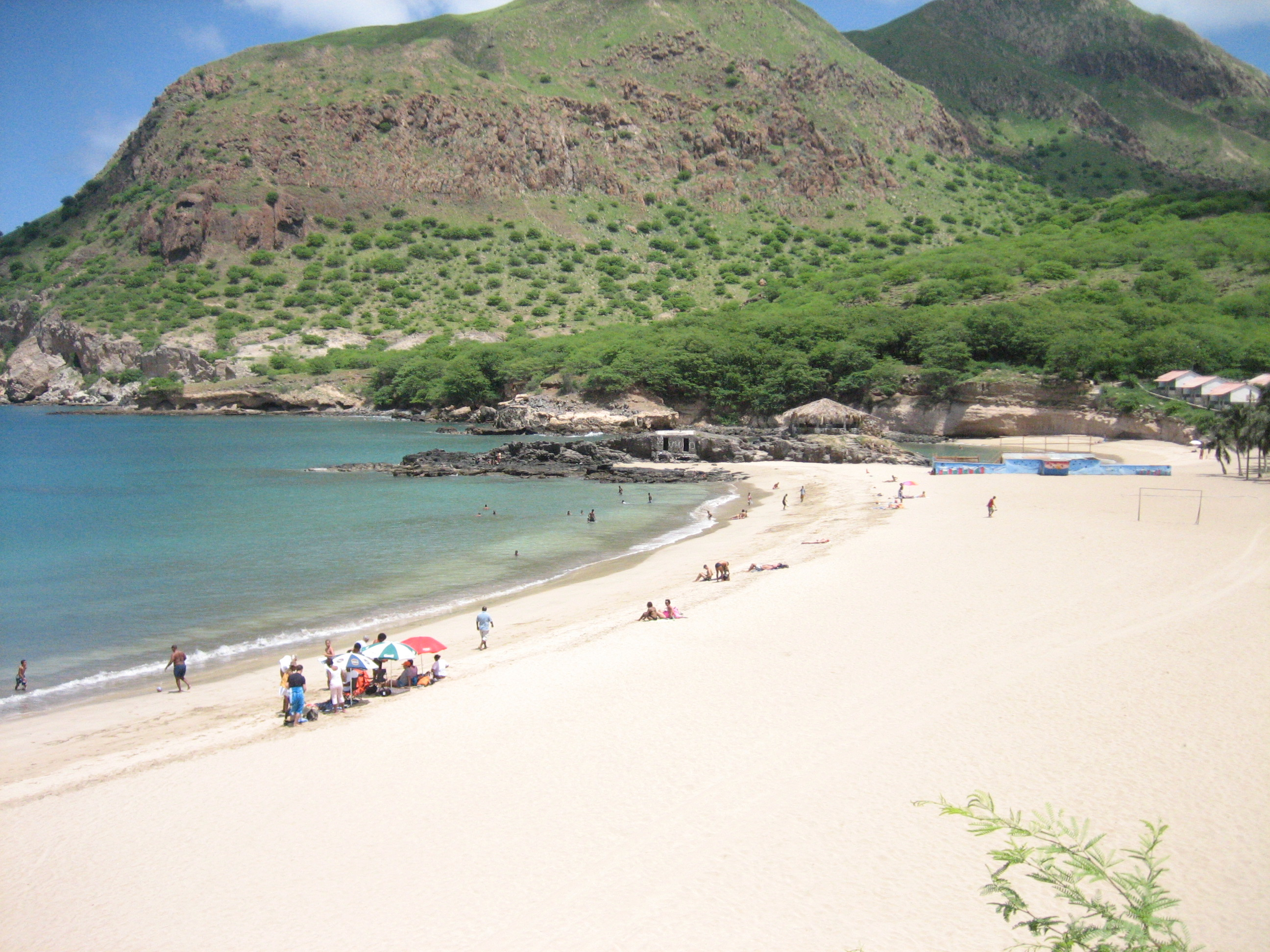
The Tarrafal beach

- Cabo de Santa Maria – has a 10 km beach
- Flamengos
- Praia Grande
- Tarrafal

== Chile ==
- Anakena (Easter Island)

=== Far north ===
- Arica
- Antofagasta
- Bahía Inglesa
- La Rinconada
- Punta Rieles

=== Near north ===
- Guanaqueros
- Morrillos
- La Herradura
- La Serena
- Las Tacas
- Las Tórtolas
- Peñuelas

=== Central Chile ===
- La Puntilla
- Las Terrazas
- Chorrillos
- Infiernillo
- Hermosa
- Reñaca

=== Southern Chile ===
- Cole Cole
- Chaihuín
- Chica
- La Barra
- Coique
- Colún
- Curiñanco
- de Los Enamorados
- Grande
- Los Molinos
- Pilolcura

== China ==
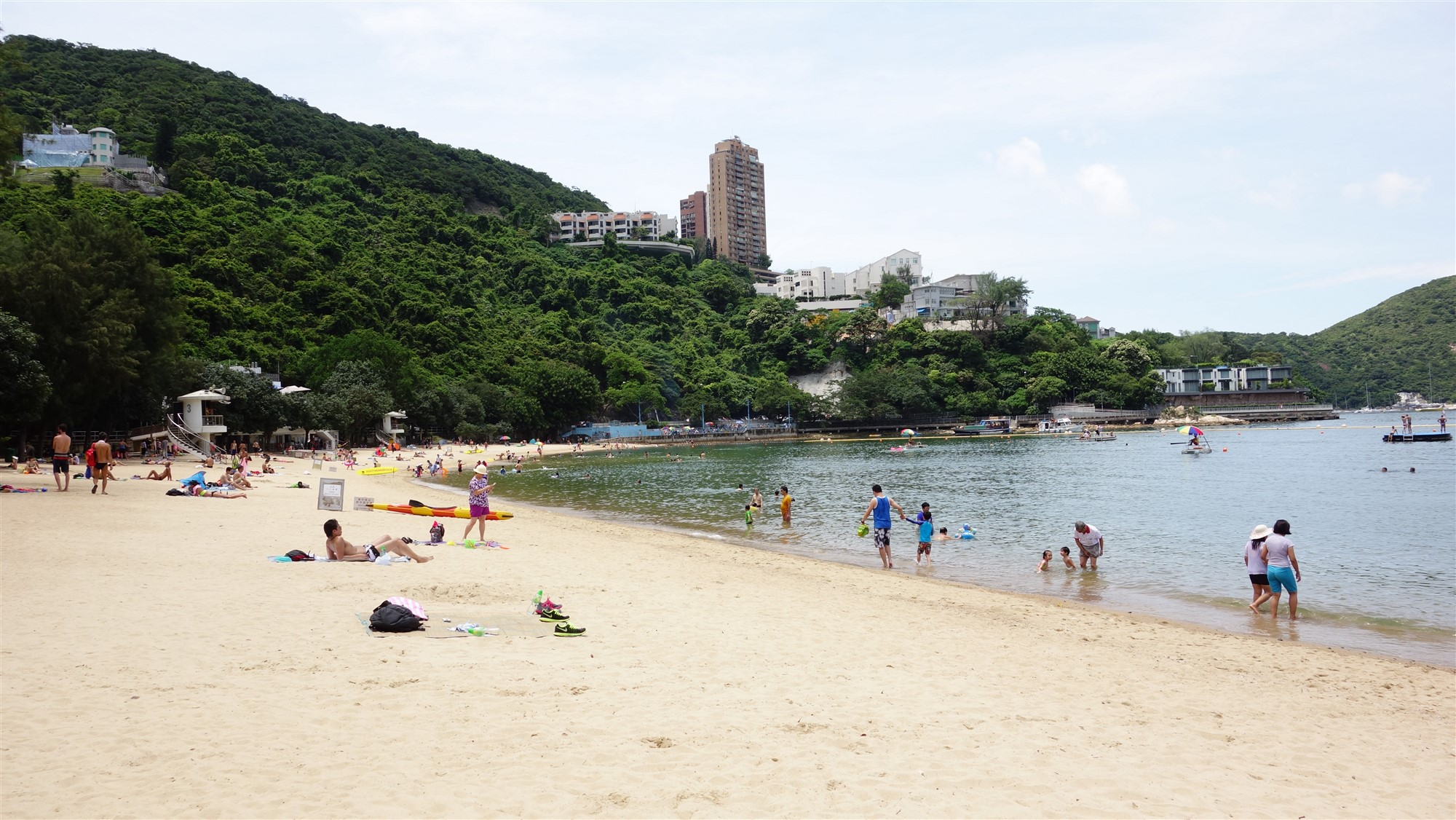
Deep Water Bay Beach, Hong Kong

- Xichong, Shenzhen
- Yalong Bay, Hainan

== Colombia ==
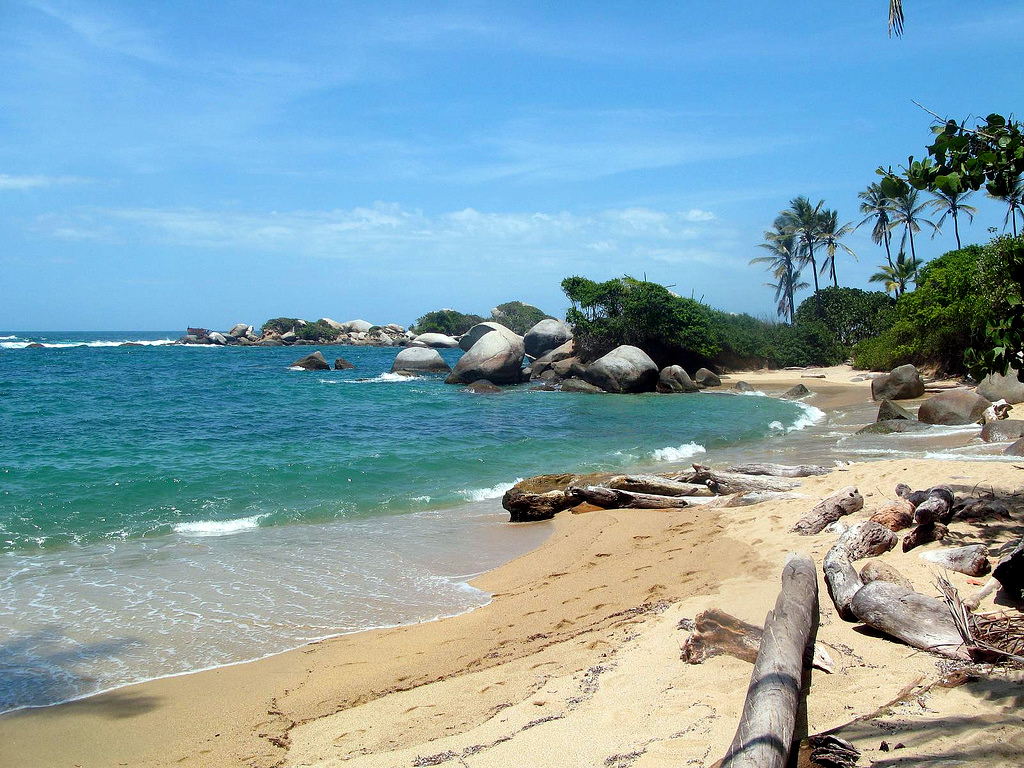
Tayrona National Natural Park, Colombia

- Bahía Solano
- Bocagrande in Cartagena
- Malpelo Island
- San Andrés - an island
- Tayrona National Natural Park

== Comoros ==
- Le Galawa Beach – located in Mitsamiouli, Grande Comore, at the Le Galawa Beach Hotel

== Costa Rica ==
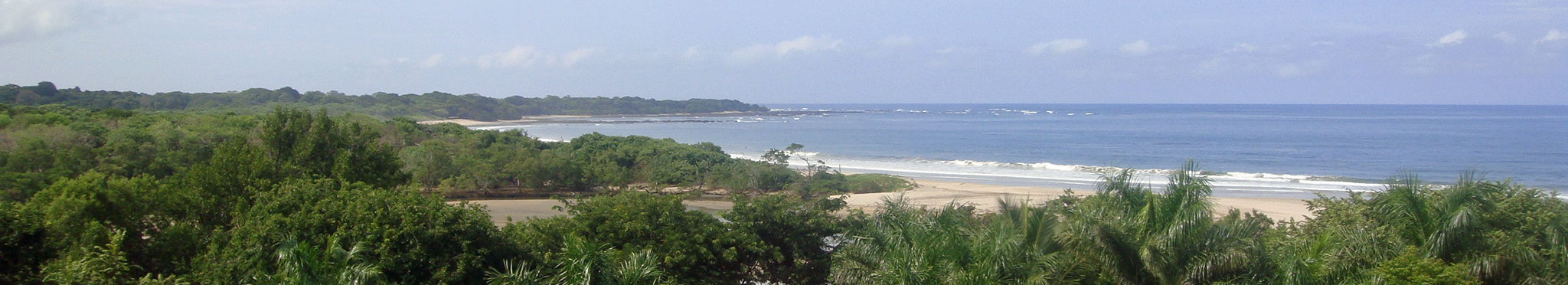
A panoramic view of Las Baulas National Marine Park and Playa Grande, located 2 km from downtown Tamarindo, Costa Rica

Guanacaste Province

- Gulf of Papagayo
- Montezuma
- Nosara
- Playa Grande
- Playa Negra
- Playa Tamarindo
- Santa Teresa

Limon Province

- Cahuita National Park
- Puerto Viejo de Talamanca
- Tortuguero, Costa Rica
- Tortuguero National Park

Puntarenas Province

- Carmen Beach
- Jacó, Costa Rica
- Manuel Antonio National Park
- Playa Blanca
- Playa Herradura
- Puntarenas

== Croatia ==
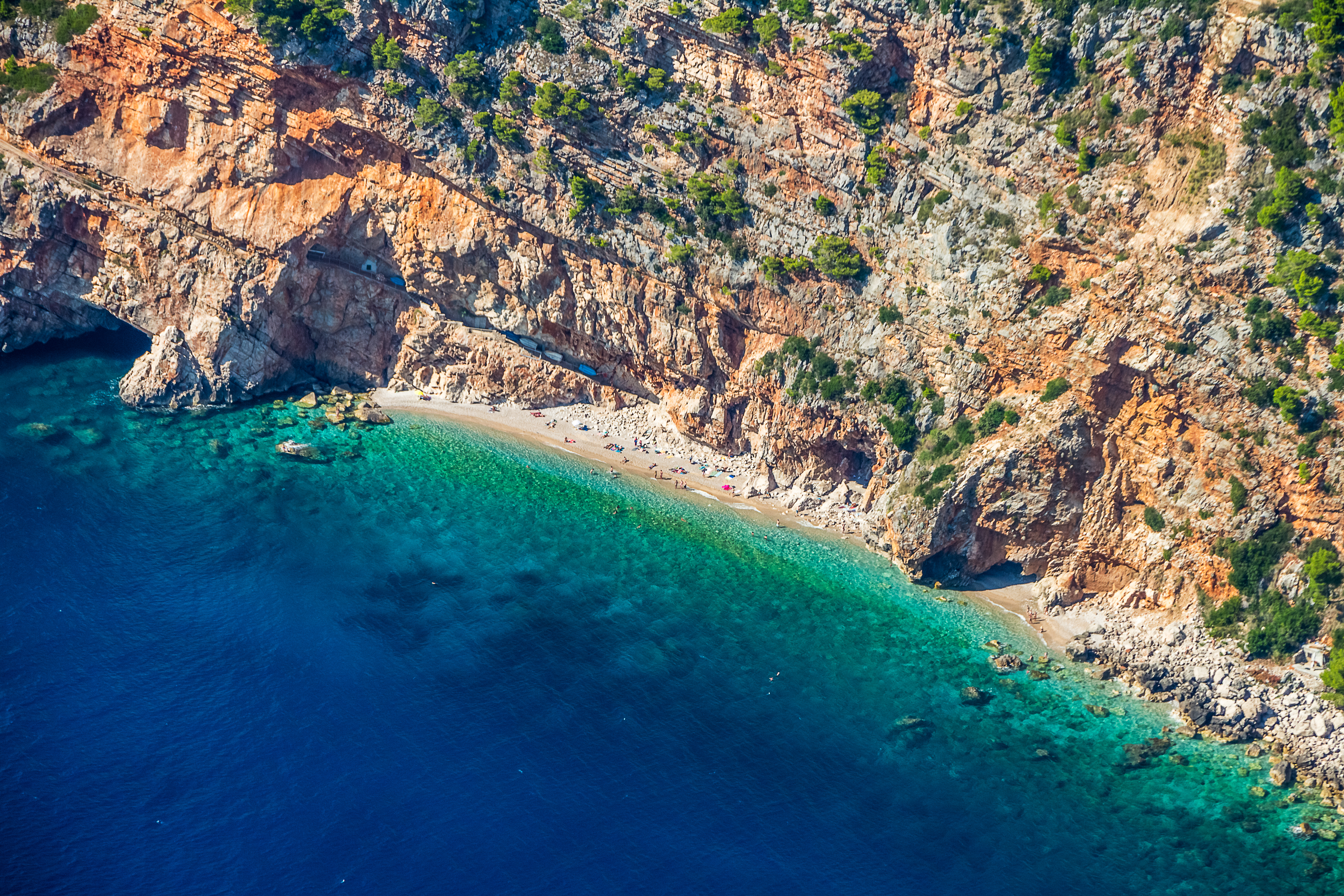
Pasjača, Konavle, Croatia

- Brela, southern Dalmatia
- Banj beach, Šibenik, northern Dalmatia
- Nugal Beach, Makarska Riviera, southern Dalmatia
- Pasjača Beach, near Cavtat, Konavle Region, the 2020 most beautiful beach of Europe
- Sahara Beach, Lopar, Island of Rab
- Zlatni Rat, Bol, Island of Brač
- Zrće, near Novalja, Island of Pag

== Cuba ==
- Varadero

== Cyprus ==
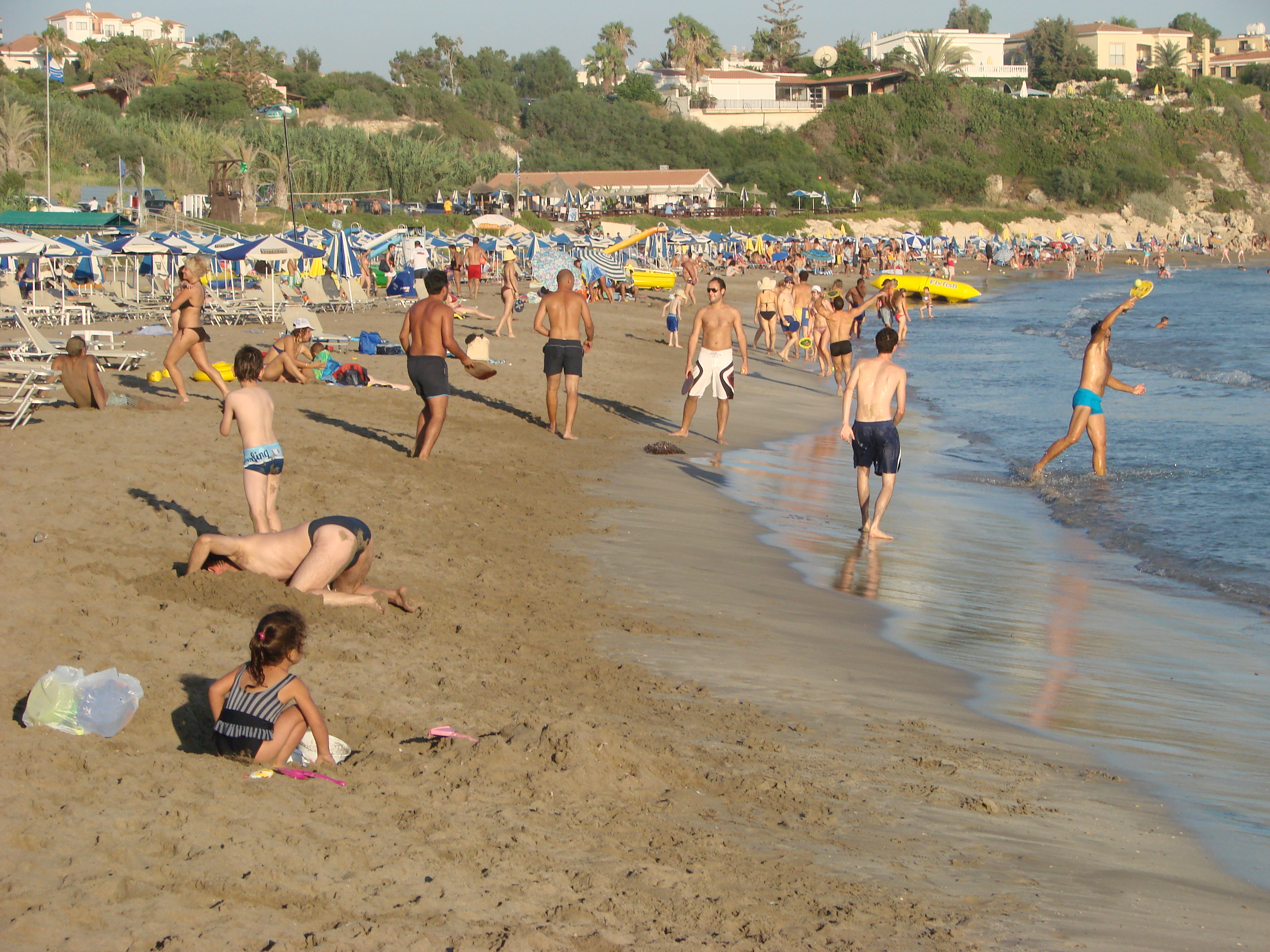
Coral Bay, Cyprus, Cyprus in 2007

- Coral Bay
- Faros beach
- Fig Tree Bay
- Nissi beach

== Denmark ==
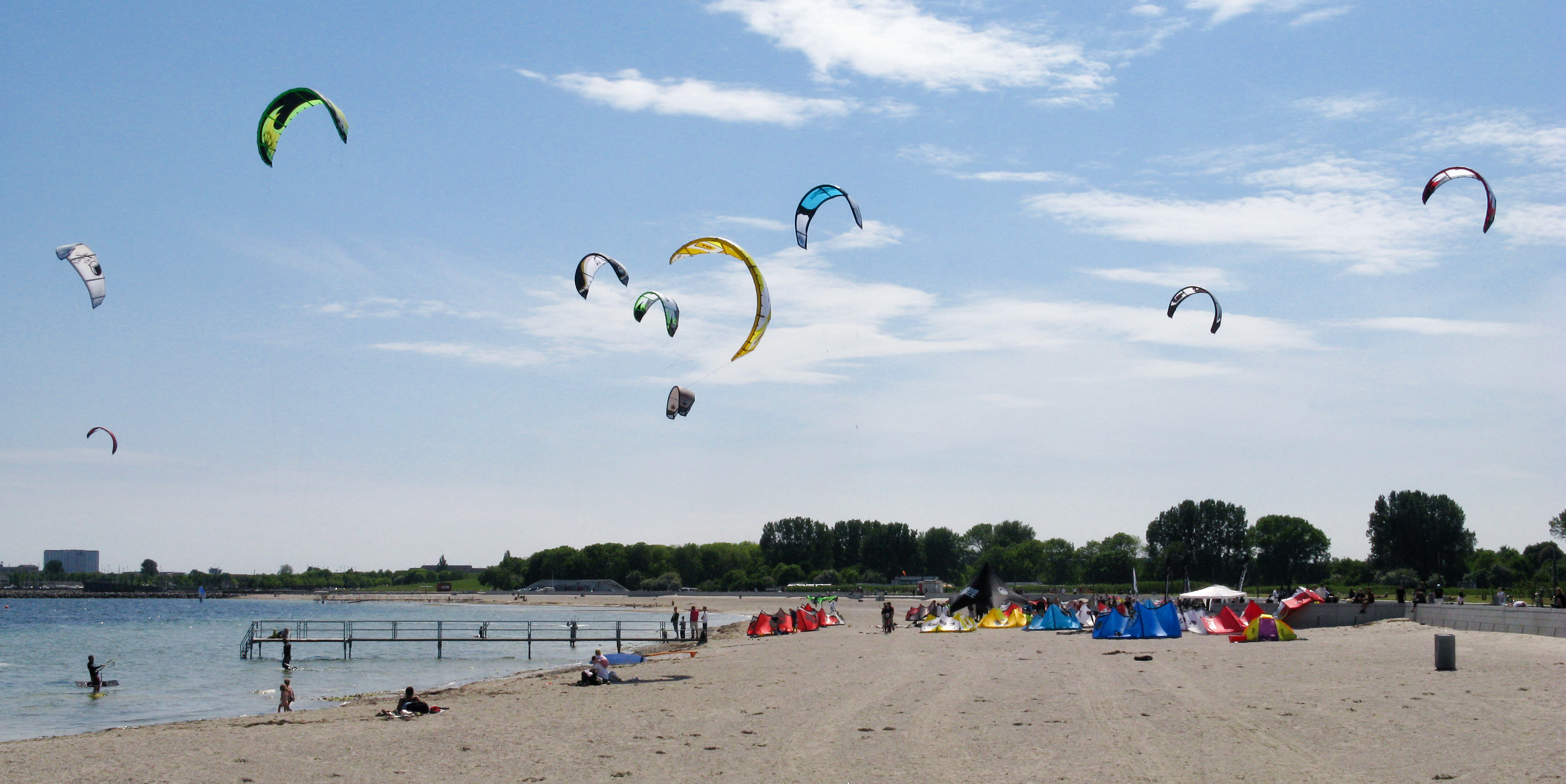
Kitesurfers at Amager Strandpark in Copenhagen

- Amager Strand, Copenhagen
- Balka Strand, Bornholm
- Bisnap Strand, North Jutland Island
- Dueodde, Bornholm
- Fanø Bad, Fanø
- Gudmindrup Strand, northern Zealand
- Hornbæk Strand, Nordsjælland
- Marielyst Strand, Falster
- Råbylille Strand, Møn
- Skagen Strand, North Jutland Island
- Skallerup Klit, North Jutland Island
- Smørmosen Strand, Thurø
- Vesterø Strand, Læsø

== Egypt ==
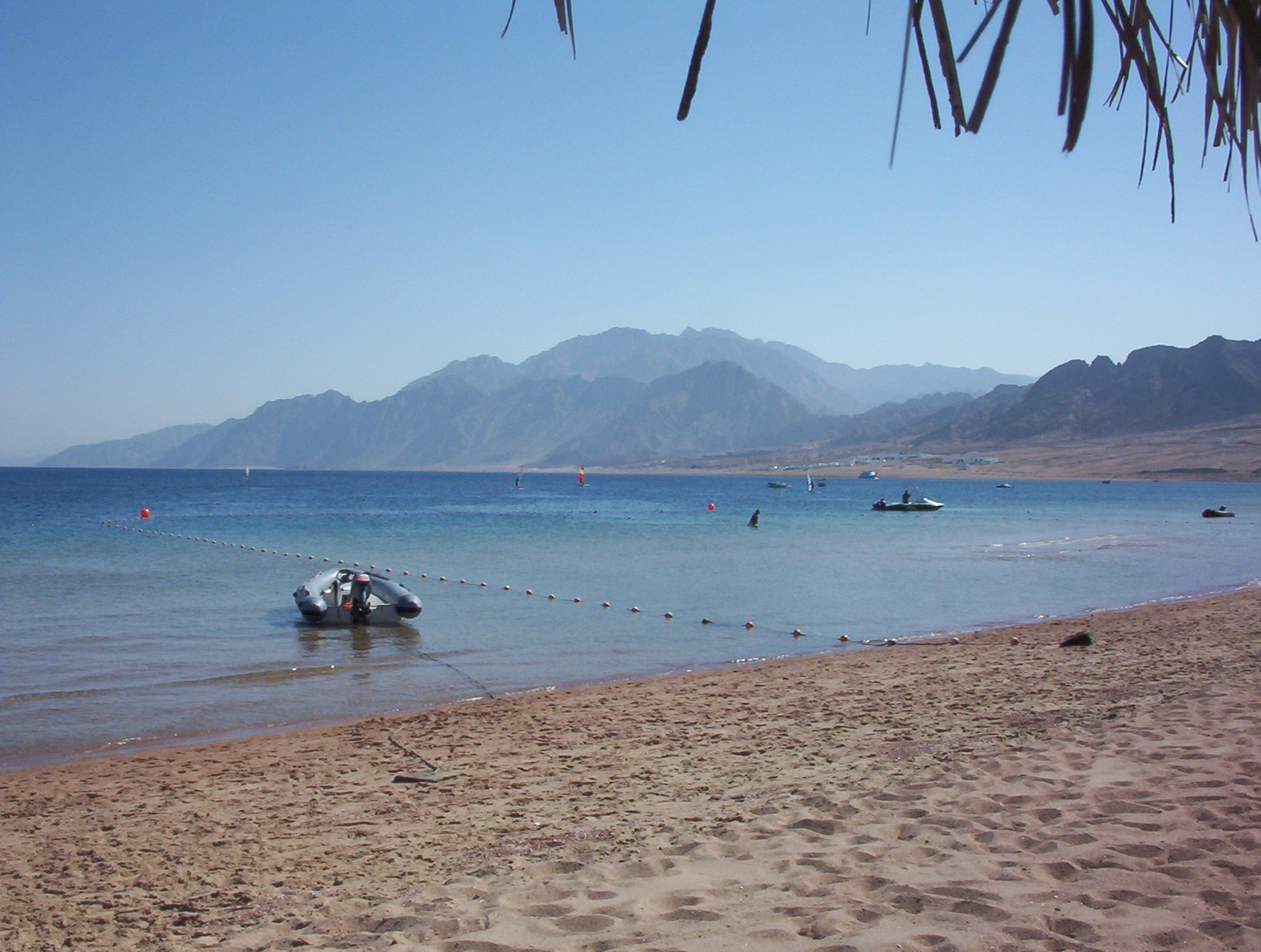
The shoreline at Dahab, Egypt

- Dahab
- Gamasa
- Hurghada
- Maamoura Beach, Alexandria
- Mersa Matruh
- Ras El Bar
- Sharm el-Sheikh
- Sidi Abdel Rahman
- Taba

== El Salvador ==
- Costa del Sol
- La Libertad
- Playa El Cuco
- Playa El Majahual
- Playa El Sunzal
- Playa El Tunco
- Playa El Zonte
- Playa San Diego

== Fiji ==
- Yanuca – an island with white sandy beaches and lush vegetation

== Finland ==
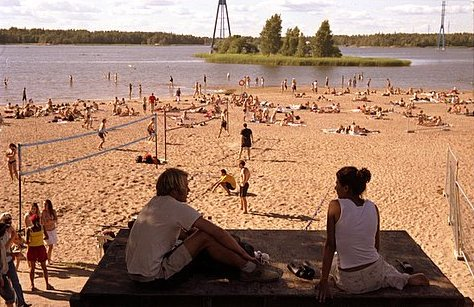
Hietaniemi beach in Finland

- Hietaniemi beach
- Kangasjärvi – a small lake with a small beach
- Koitere – a large lake with many beaches
- Ruissalo – an island in the Archipelago Sea with a beach in its southwest
- Yyteri one of the longest sand beaches in Nordics

== France ==
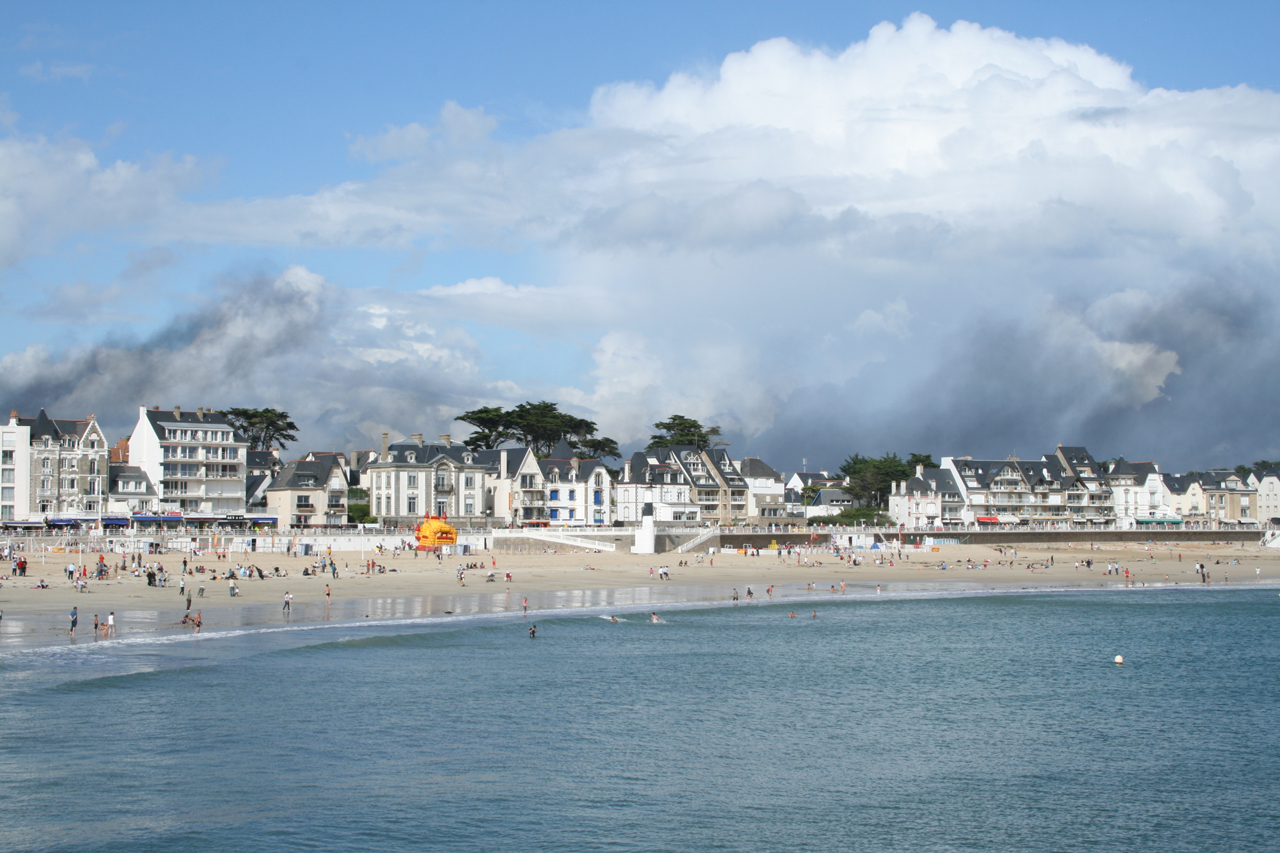
Quiberon in France

- Porto-Vecchio, Corsica
- Le Diamant, Martinique
- Argelès-sur-Mer, Pyrénées-Orientales
- Banyuls-sur-Mer, Pyrénées-Orientales
- Canet-en-Roussillon, Pyrénées-Orientales
- La Grande-Motte, Hérault
- Collioure, Pyrénées-Orientales
- Saint-Cyprien, Pyrénées-Orientales
- Biarritz, Pyrénées-Atlantiques
- Hossegor, Landes
- Mimizan, Landes
- Biscarrosse, Landes
- Arcachon, Gironde
- Cap Ferret, Gironde
- Lacanau, Gironde
- Royan, Charente-Maritime
- La Baule-Escoublac, Loire-Atlantique
- Quiberon, Morbihan
- Deauville, Calvados
- Le Touquet, Pas-de-Calais
- Bora Bora, French Polynesia
- Teahupo'o, French Polynesia

== Gambia ==
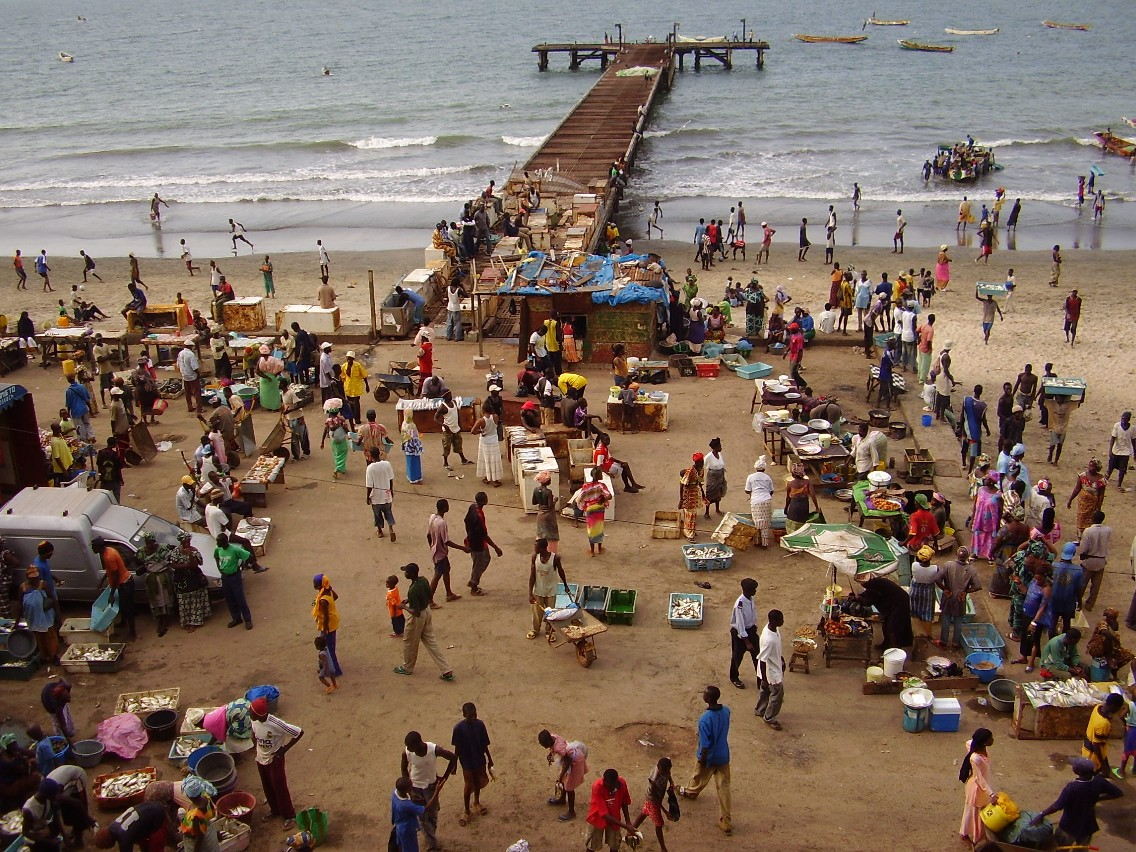
A fish market at Bakau in Gambia

- Bakau
- Fajara
- Kololi

== Georgia ==
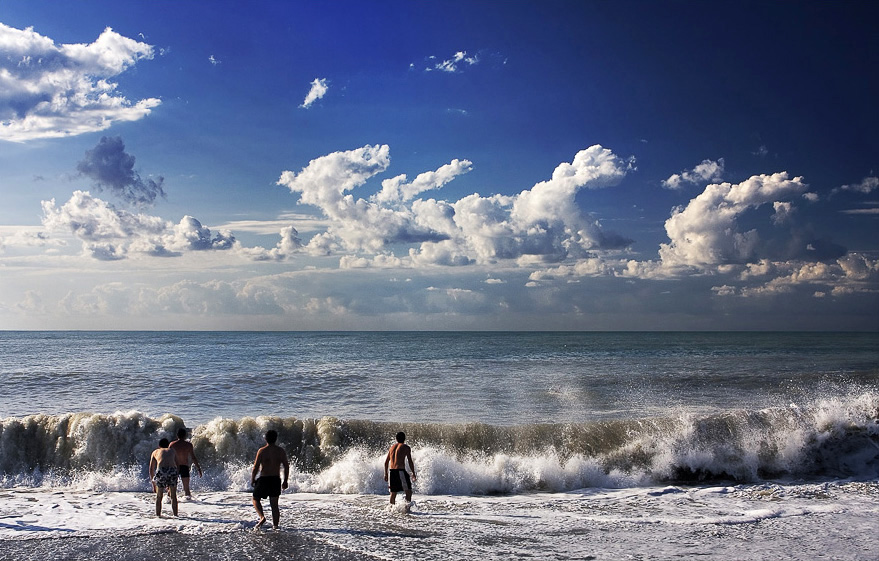
A beach at Batumi, Georgia

- Anaklia beaches
- Batumi beaches
- Chakvi, Gonio
- Gagra
- Kobuleti beaches
- Sukhumi
- Ureki

== Germany ==
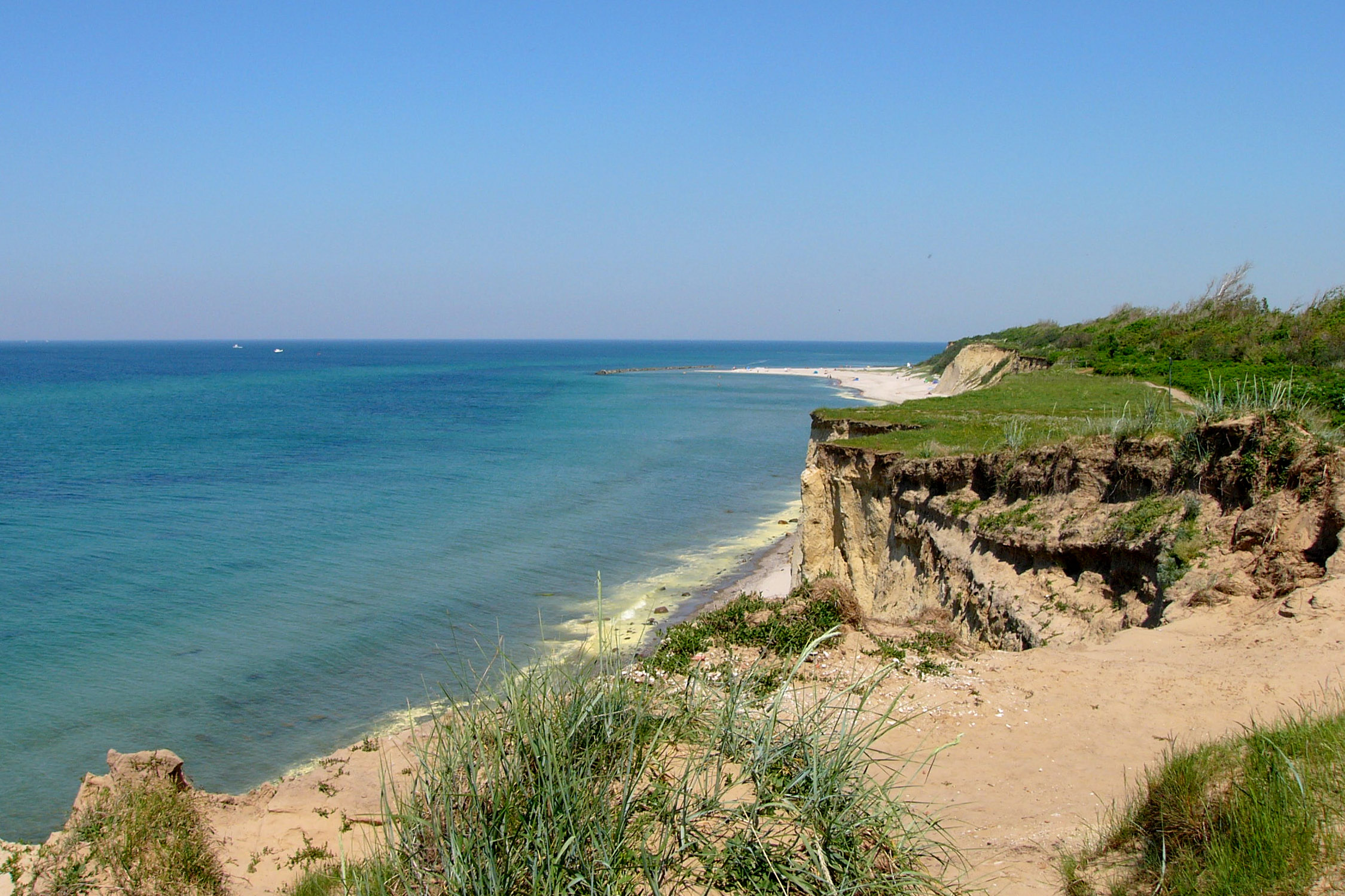
A typical German Baltic Sea beach: Darss West Beach, near Ahrenshoop

Baltic Sea
North Sea
- Amber Beach
- Binz Beach
- Boltenhagen Beach
- Darss West Beach
- Glücksburg Beach
- Göhren Beach
- Heiligendamm Beach
- Kaiser Beach
- Kühlungsborn Beach
- Laboe Beach
- Lubmin Beach
- Sellin Beach
- Timmendorfer Strand
- Travemünde Beach
- Warnemünde Beach
- Zingst Beach
- Amrum Beach
- Baltrum Beach
- Cuxhaven Beach
- Heligoland Beach
- Juist Beach
- Norderney Beach
- Pellworm Beach
- Spiekeroog Beach
- St. Peter-Ording Beach
- Sylt Beach

== Ghana ==
- Labadi Beach

== Greece ==
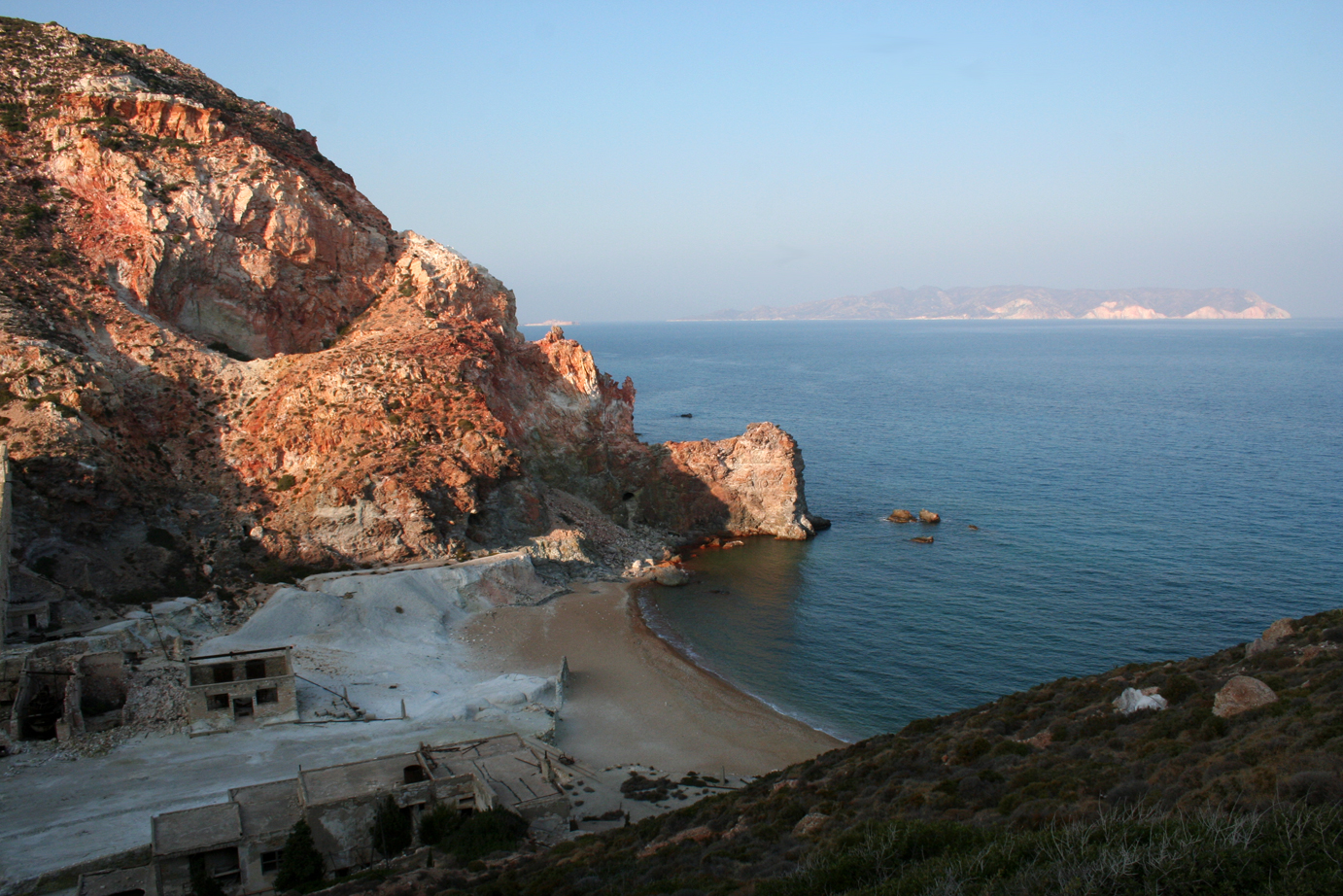
Thiorichia Beach in Greece

- Gytheio, Laconia — Mani
- Milos Island Beaches
- Rhodes
- Valtos Beach, Parga
- Zacharo

== Guatemala ==
- Monterrico

== Haiti ==
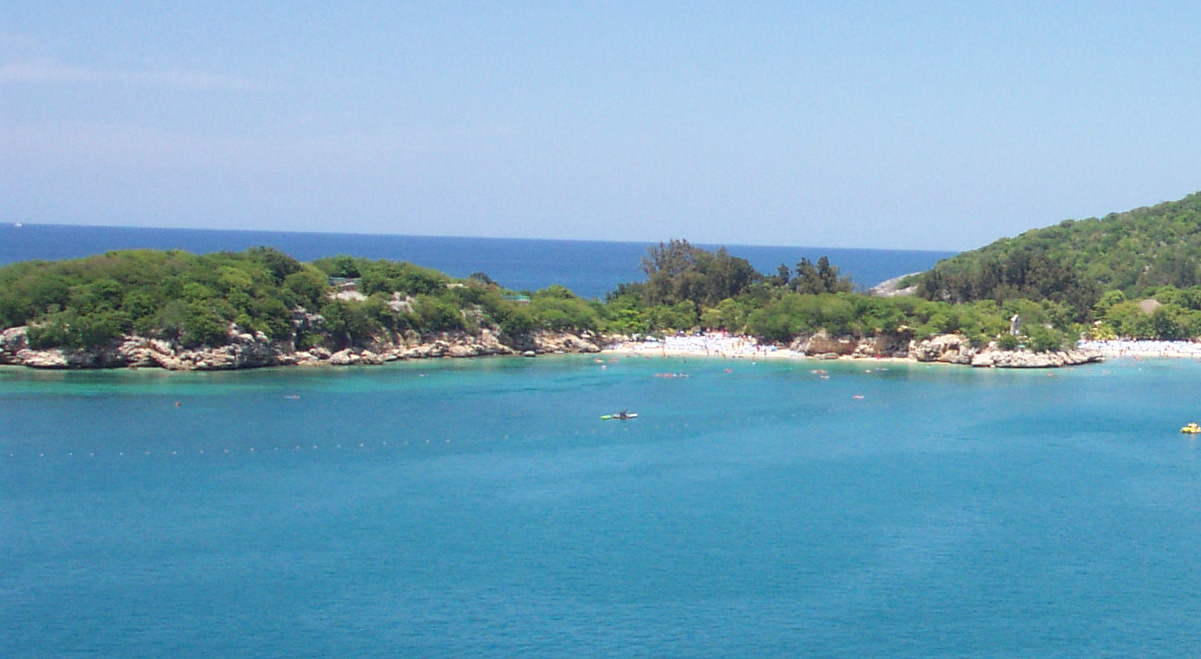
Labadee, Haiti

- Jacmel, Sud-Est
- Labadee, Cap-Haïtien
- Montrouis, Artibonite
- Port-Salut, Sud

== Hungary ==
- Balatonberény

== India ==
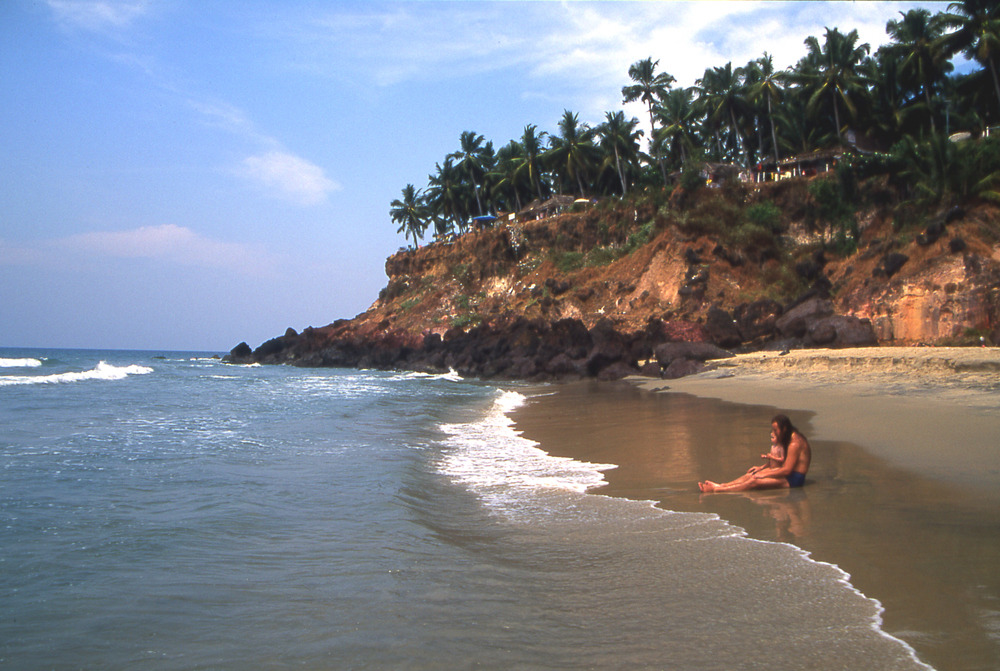
Varkala Beach, Trivandrum, Kerala

== Iran ==
- Astara, Iran
- Bandar-e Anzali, Caspian Sea
- Babolsar, Caspian Sea
- Kiashahr, Caspian Sea
- Langarud, Caspian Sea
- Rasht, Caspian Sea
- In the south Persian gulf Khuzestan province, Bushehr province, Sistan, Hormozgan province
- Kish Island
- Qeshm
- Hormuz Island
- Bandar Abbas

== Ireland ==
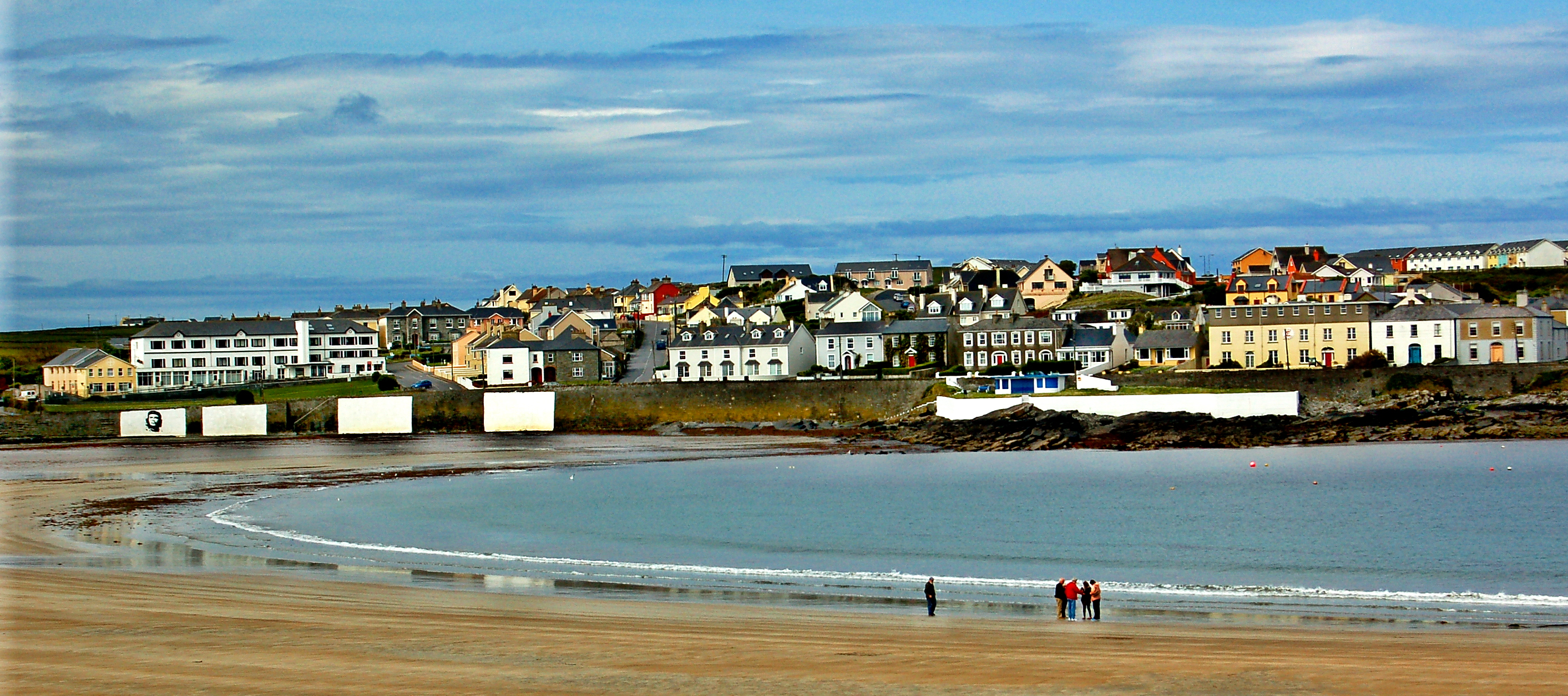
Kilkee Beach on the west coast of Ireland

- Ballybunion, County Kerry
- Ballyheigue, County Kerry
- Banna Strand, County Kerry
- Barleycove, County Cork
- Bray, County Wicklow
- Brittas Bay, County Wicklow
- Bundoran, County Donegal
- Cappa Pier, Kilrush, County Clare
- Enniscrone, County Sligo
- Fanore, County Clare
- Gurteen Beach, County Galway
- Inchydoney Beach, County Cork
- Kells Bay, County Kerry
- Kilkee, County Clare
- Lahinch, County Clare
- Laytown, County Meath
- Myrtleville, County Cork
- Quilty Beach, Quilty, County Clare
- Rosscarbery, County Cork
- Sherkin Island, County Cork
- Spanish Point, County Clare
- Rossnowlagh, County Donegal
- Boyeeghter Bay, County Donegal
- Tramore, County Waterford
- White Strand, Milltown Malbay, County Clare
- Youghal, County Cork

== Italy ==
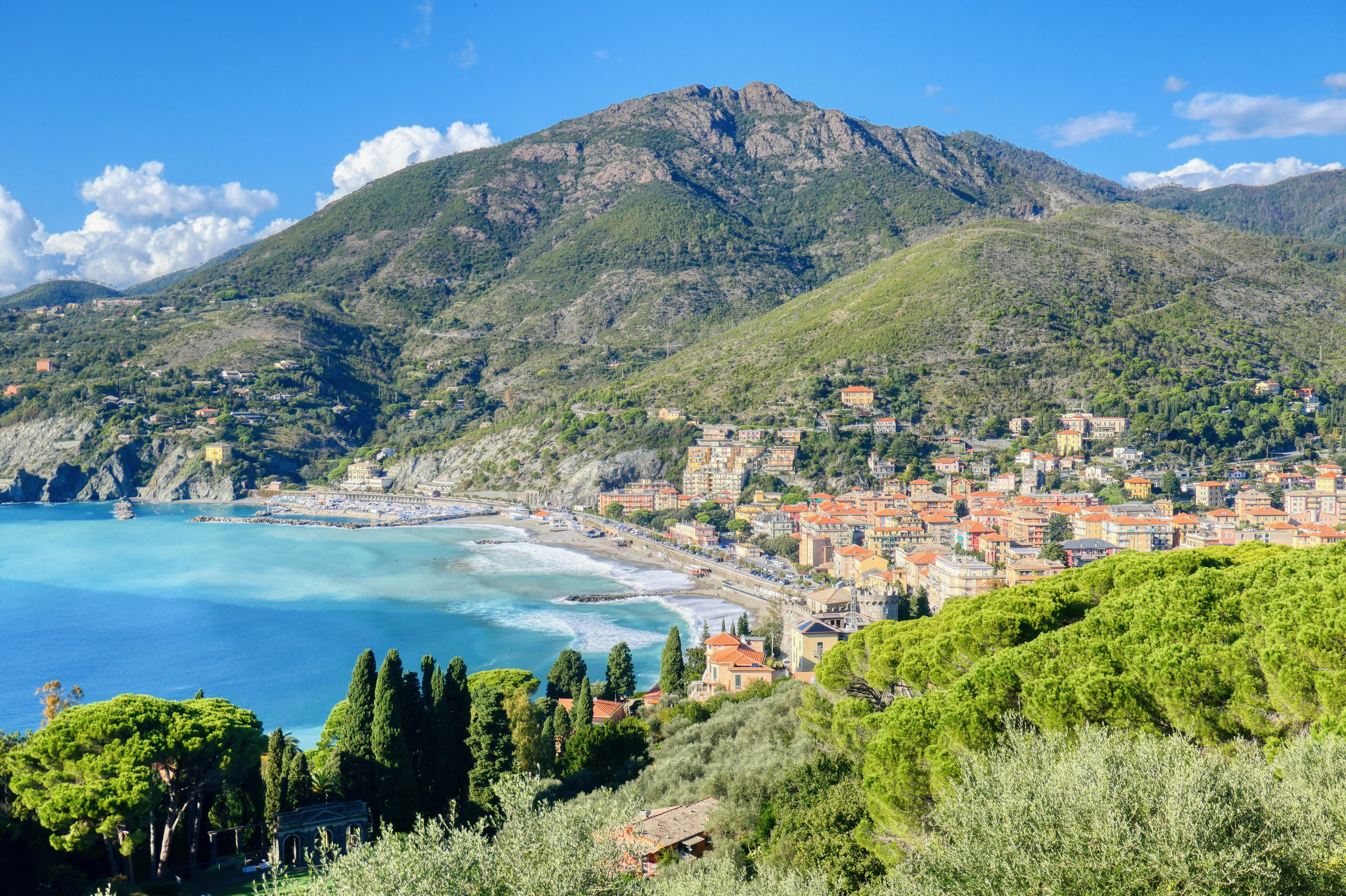
Cinque Terre in Italy is a UNESCO World Heritage Site.

== Ivory Coast ==
- Assinie

== Jamaica ==
- Negril

== Japan ==
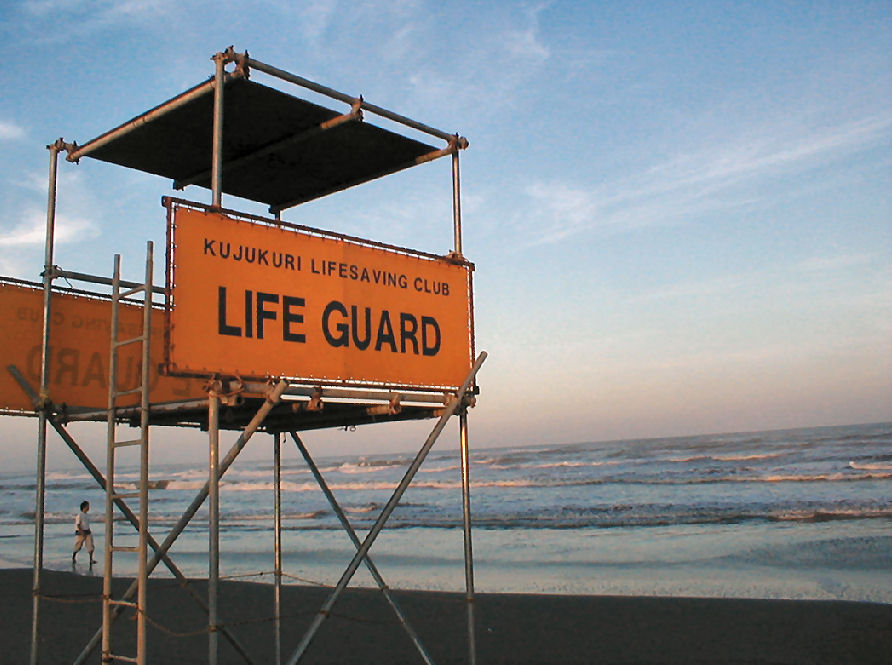
Kujukuri Beach on a summer evening in Japan.

- Gappo Park
- Kujukuri Beach
- Tenjin Beach
- Tenno Beach

== Jordan ==
- Aqaba – has beach resorts
- Beach clubs exist at the Dead Sea and Aqaba

== Kenya ==
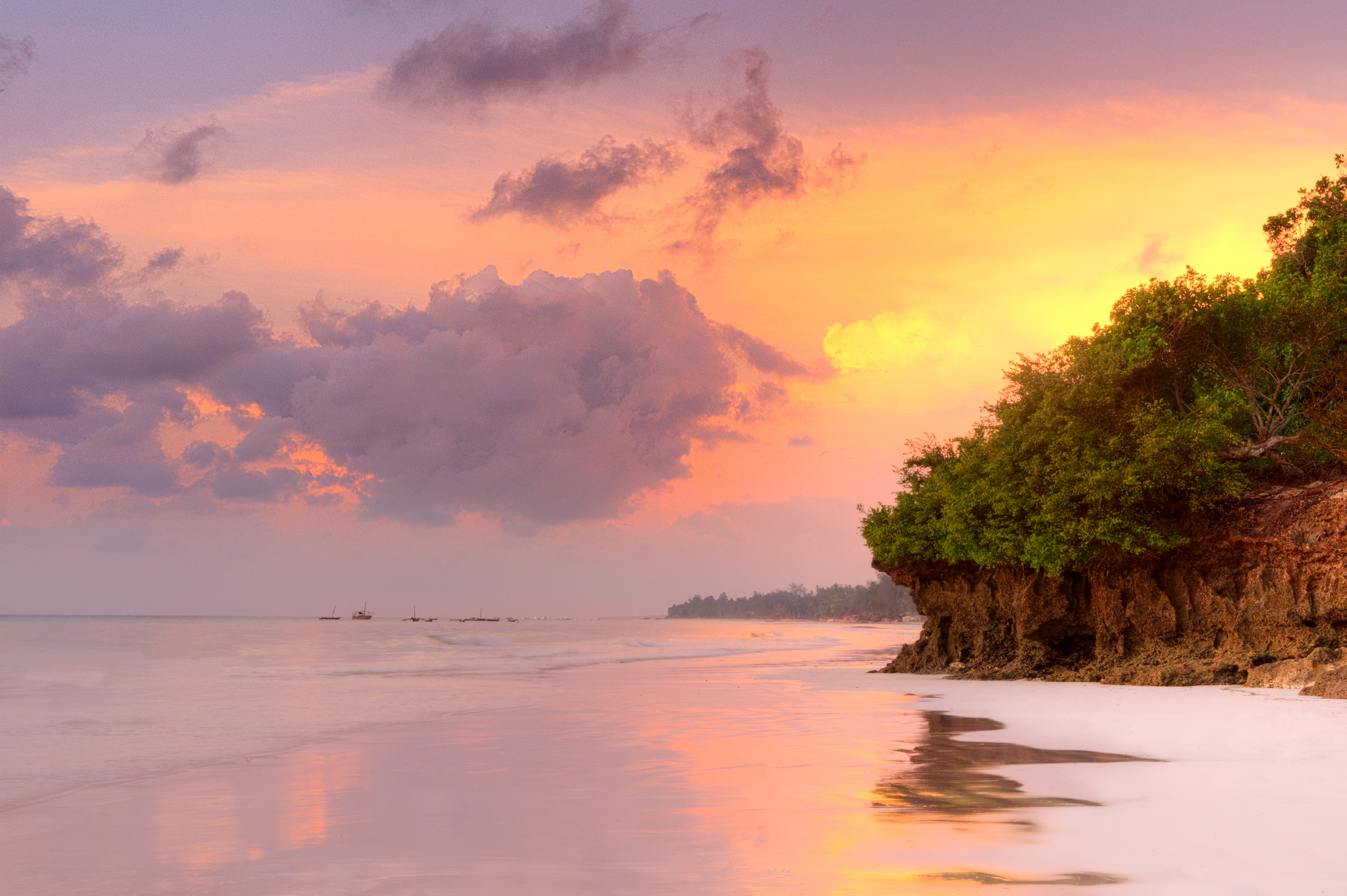
Sunset at Diani Beach in Kenya.

- Diani Beach, Kwale County

== Kiribati ==
- Aranuka
- Birnie Island
- Nakaa Beach
- Teraina

== South Korea ==
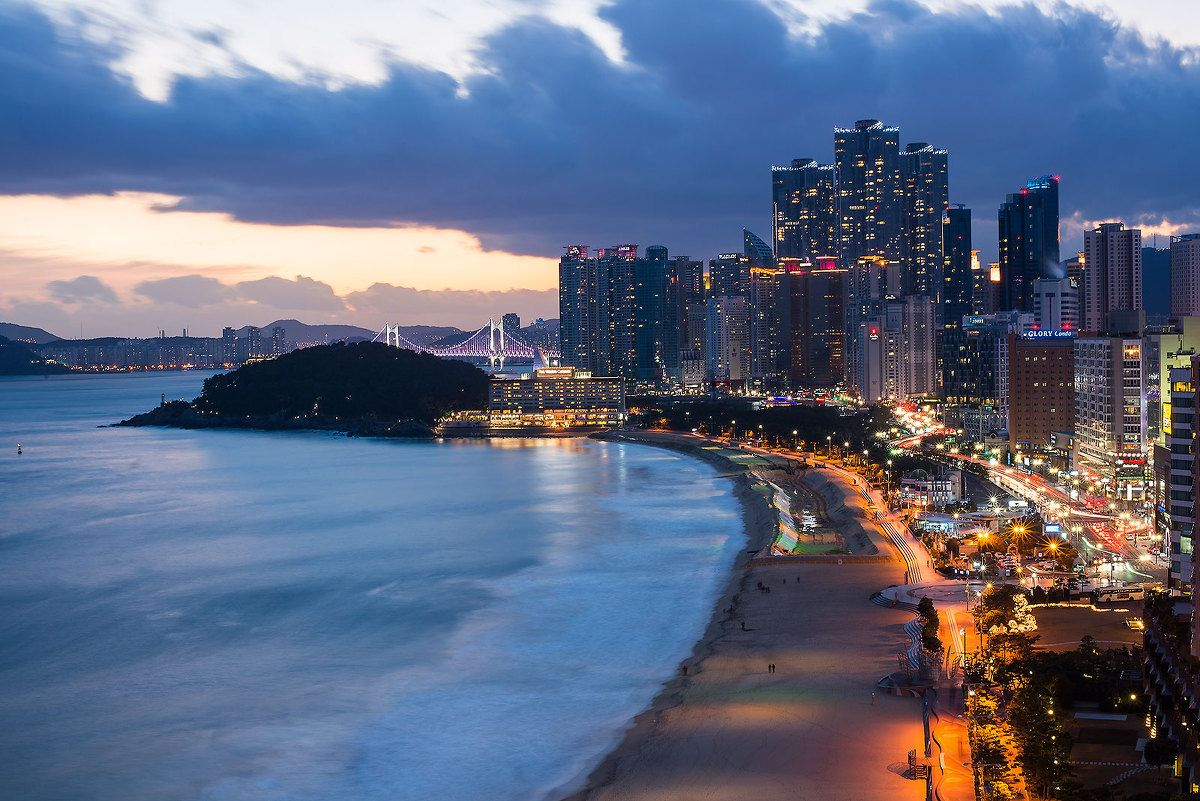
Haeundae Beach in South Korea

- Gwangalli Beach, Busan
- Haeundae Beach, Busan

== Lebanon ==
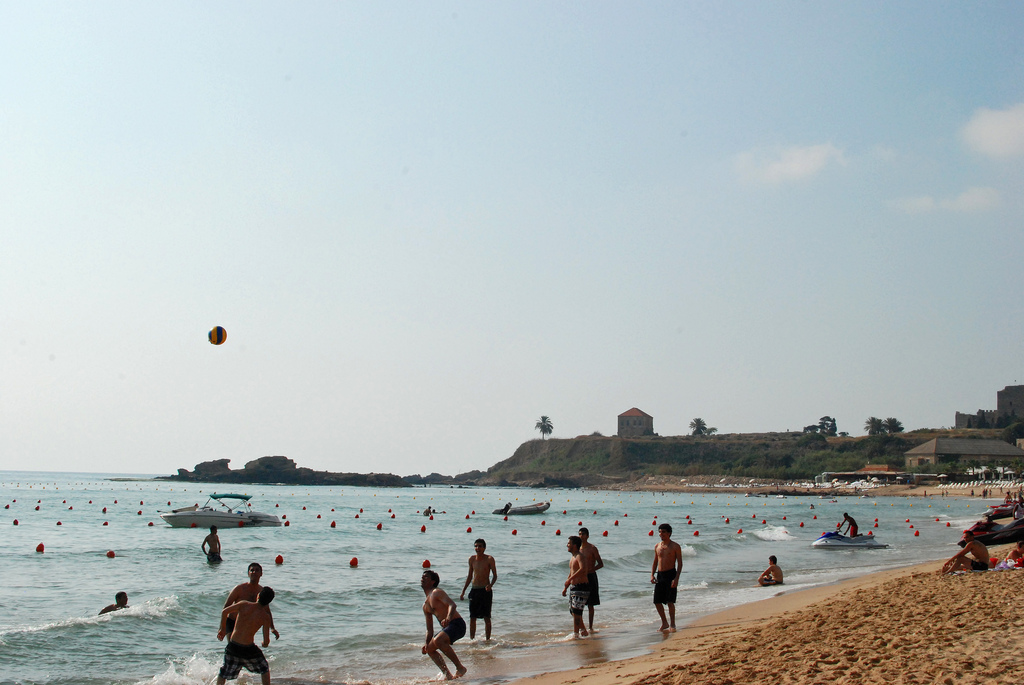
Beach volleyball on the shore of Byblos, Lebanon

- Byblos Beach
- Chekka Beach
- El Mina
- Tabarja Beach
- Tyre Beach Natural Reserve

== Madagascar ==
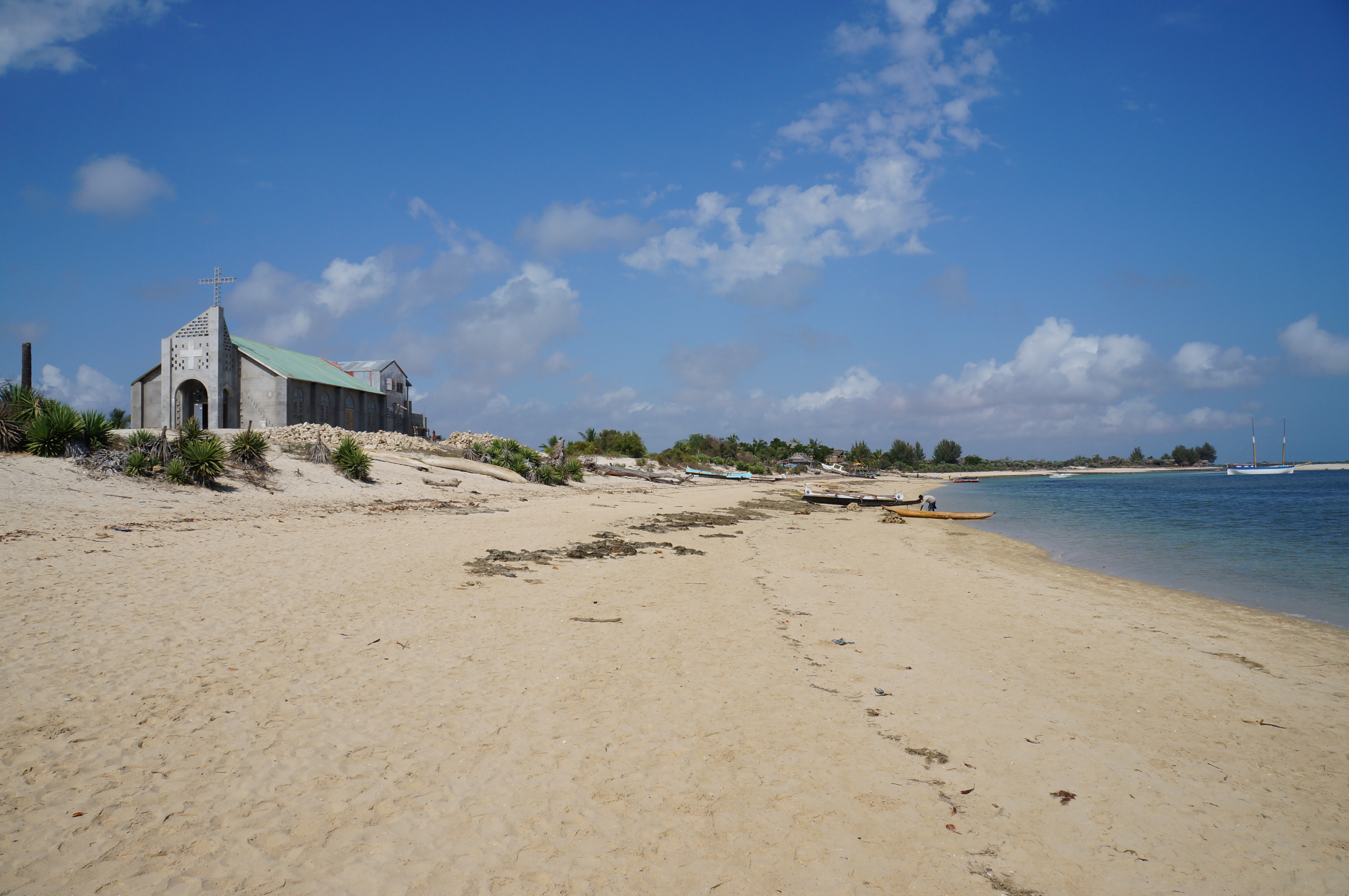
The beach and a church at Belo sur Mer in Madagascar

- Belo sur Mer
- Canal des Pangalanes – beaches along a series of man made canals linking natural lakes and rivers running down the east coast of Madagascar
- Ifaty beach – near Toliara
- Mahajanga

== Malaysia ==
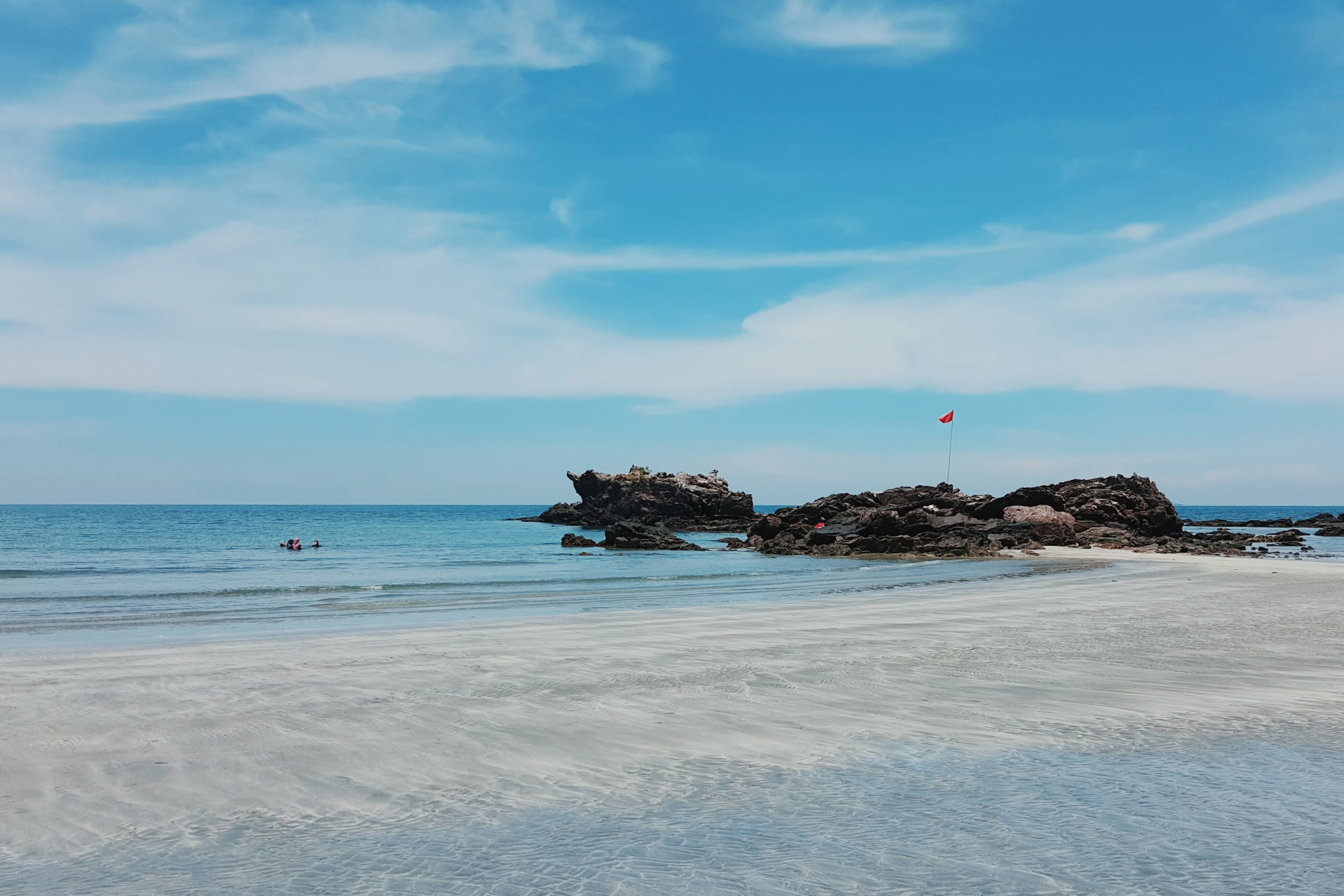
Desaru beach in Johor, Malaysia.

- Bachok, Kelantan
- Batu Ferringhi, Penang
- Cherating Beach, Pahang
- Desaru, Johor
- Hawaii Beach, Miri
- Kapas Island, Terengganu
- Lang Tengah Island, Terengganu
- Langkawi Island, Kedah
- Lutong Beach, Miri
- Mabul Island, Sabah
- Pangkor Island, Perak
- Pantai Cahaya Bulan, Kelantan
- Pantai Sri Tujoh, Kelantan
- Perhentian Islands, Terengganu
- Port Dickson, Negeri Sembilan
- Rantau Abang Beach, Terengganu
- Redang Island, Terengganu
- Tanjong Lobang Beach, Miri
- Telok Cempedak Beach, Pahang
- Tenggol Island, Terengganu
- Tioman Island, Pahang
- Tok Bali, Kelantan

== Maldives ==
- Cocoa Island, South Male Atoll
- Kurumba Beach, North Male Atoll
- Hulhumale Beach, North Male Atoll
- Bikini Beach, Maafushi
- Fulhadhoo Beach, Baa Atoll
- Reethi Beach, Baa Atoll
- Lily Beach, Dhangethi
- Fihalhohi Island
- Veligandu Island Beach, Veligandu Island
- Baros Island, North Male Atoll
- Taj Exotica Beach, South Male Atoll
- Mirihi Island Beach, South Ari Atoll
- Sun Island Beaches, South Ari Atoll
- Dhigurah Beach, South Ari Atoll
- Artificial Beach, Male Island
- Kandolhu Island Beach, North Ari Atoll
- Bodu Mora, Vaavu Atoll
- Thulusdhoo Island, Kaafu Atoll

== Malta ==
See also: Beaches in Malta

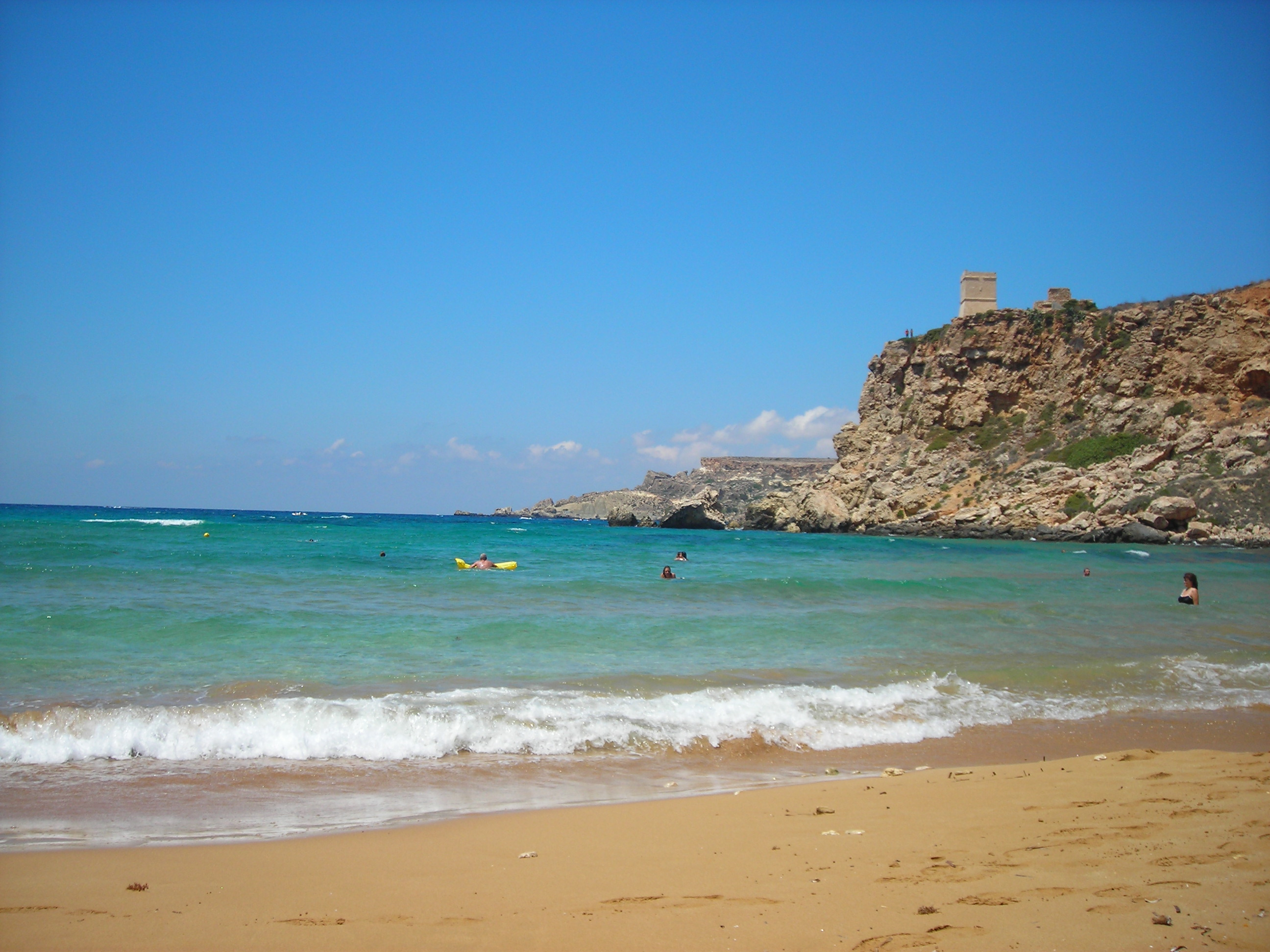
Għajn Tuffieħa bay, Malta

- Anchor Bay, Popeye Village, Mellieħa
- Armier Bay, Marfa, Mellieħa
- Blue Lagoon, Comino
- Għajn Tuffieħa, Mġarr
- Golden Bay, Manikata, Mellieħa
- Ġnejna Bay, Mġarr
- Marsalforn, Żebbuġ, Gozo
- Mellieħa Bay or (Għadira Beach), Mellieħa
- Mistra, Xemxija, San Pawl il-Baħar
- Paradise Bay (Malta), Ċirkewwa, Mellieħa
- Pretty Bay, Birżebbuġa
- Pwales Beach, Xemxija, San Pawl il-Baħar
- Ramla Bay, Xagħra, Gozo
- San Blas, Nadur, Gozo
- Santa Maria Bay, Comino
- St. George's Bay, Birżebbuġa
- St. George's Bay, Paceville, San Ġiljan
- St. Paul's Bay, Buġibba, San Pawl il-Baħar
- St. Thomas Bay, Marsaskala
- Xlendi, Munxar, Gozo

== Mauritius ==
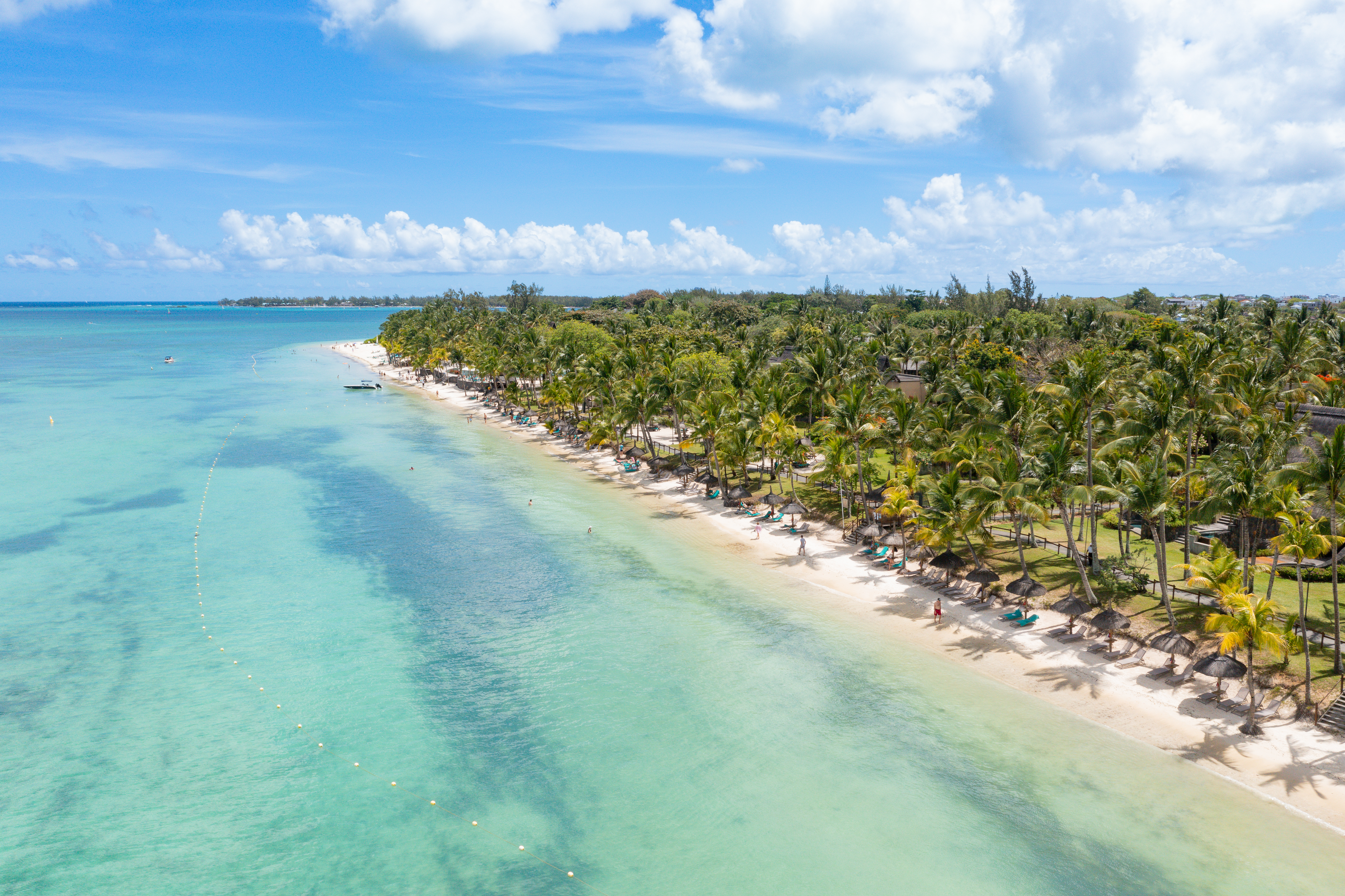
Trou-aux-Biches beach, Mauritius

- Flic en Flac
- La Preneuse
- Trou-aux-Biches
- Grand Baie
- Blue Bay Beach
- Bel Ombre Beach
- Gris Gris Beach
- St. Felix Beach

== Micronesia ==
- Taga Beach – in Tinian, one of the three principal islands of the Commonwealth of the Northern Mariana Islands
- Uruno Beach in Guam

== Montenegro ==
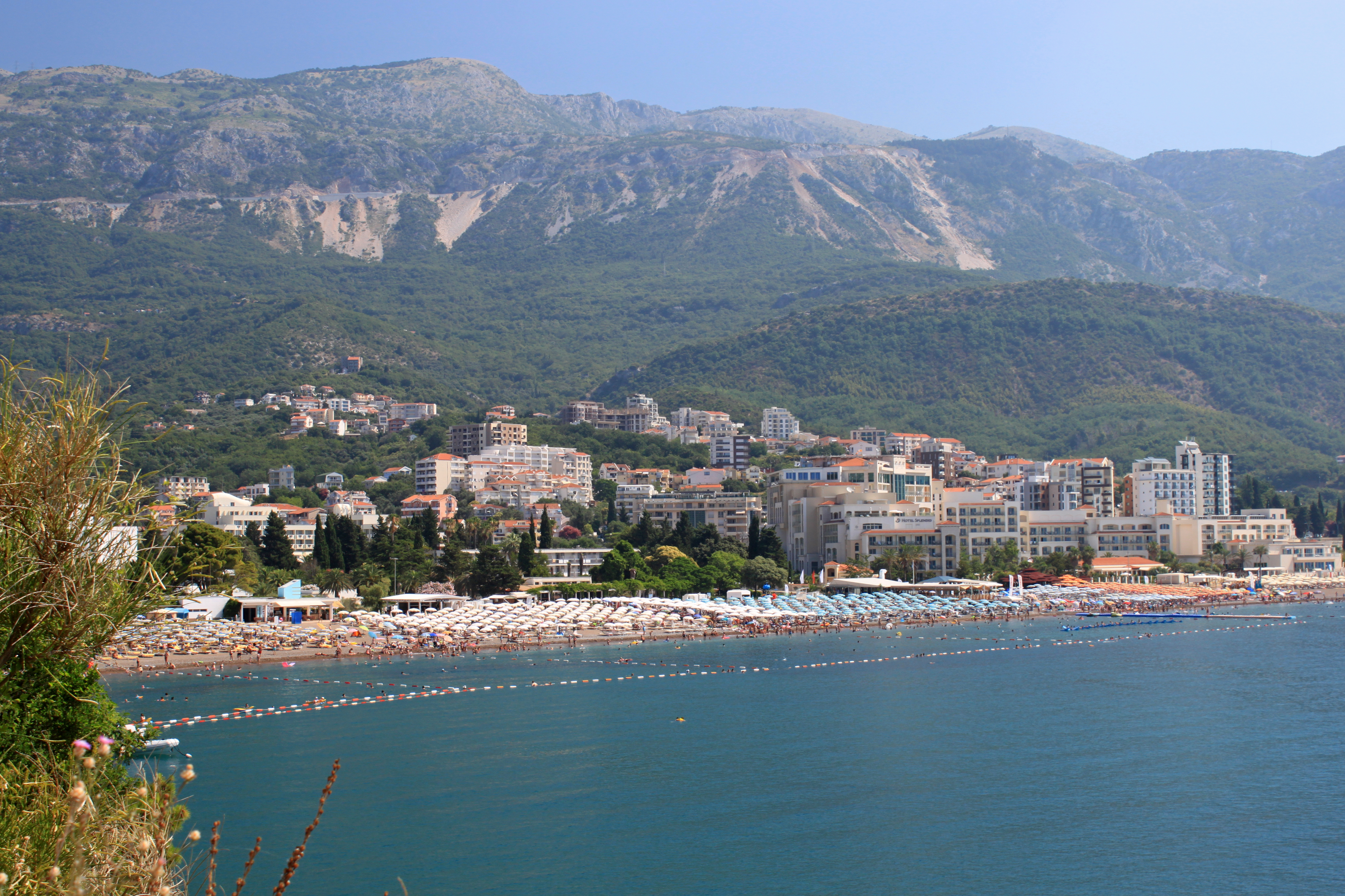
Bečići, Montenegro was voted the most beautiful European beach in 1935.

- Ada Bojana, Ulcinj
- Bečići, Budva
- Buljarica, Budva
- Crvena Plaža, Bar
- Drobni Pijesak, Budva
- Gradska Plaža, Bar
- Jaz Beach, Budva
- Kamenovo, Budva
- Kraljičina Plaža, Budva
- Ladies Beach
- Liman, Ulcinj
- Liman II, Ulcinj
- Mala Plaža, Ulcinj
- Miločer, Budva
- Mogren, Budva
- Petrovac
- Ploče, Budva
- Pržno, Budva
- Slovenska Plaza, Budva
- Sutomore, Bar
- Sveti Stefan, Budva
- Trsteno, Budva
- Velika Plaža, Ulcinj
- Žukotrlica, Bar

== Morocco ==
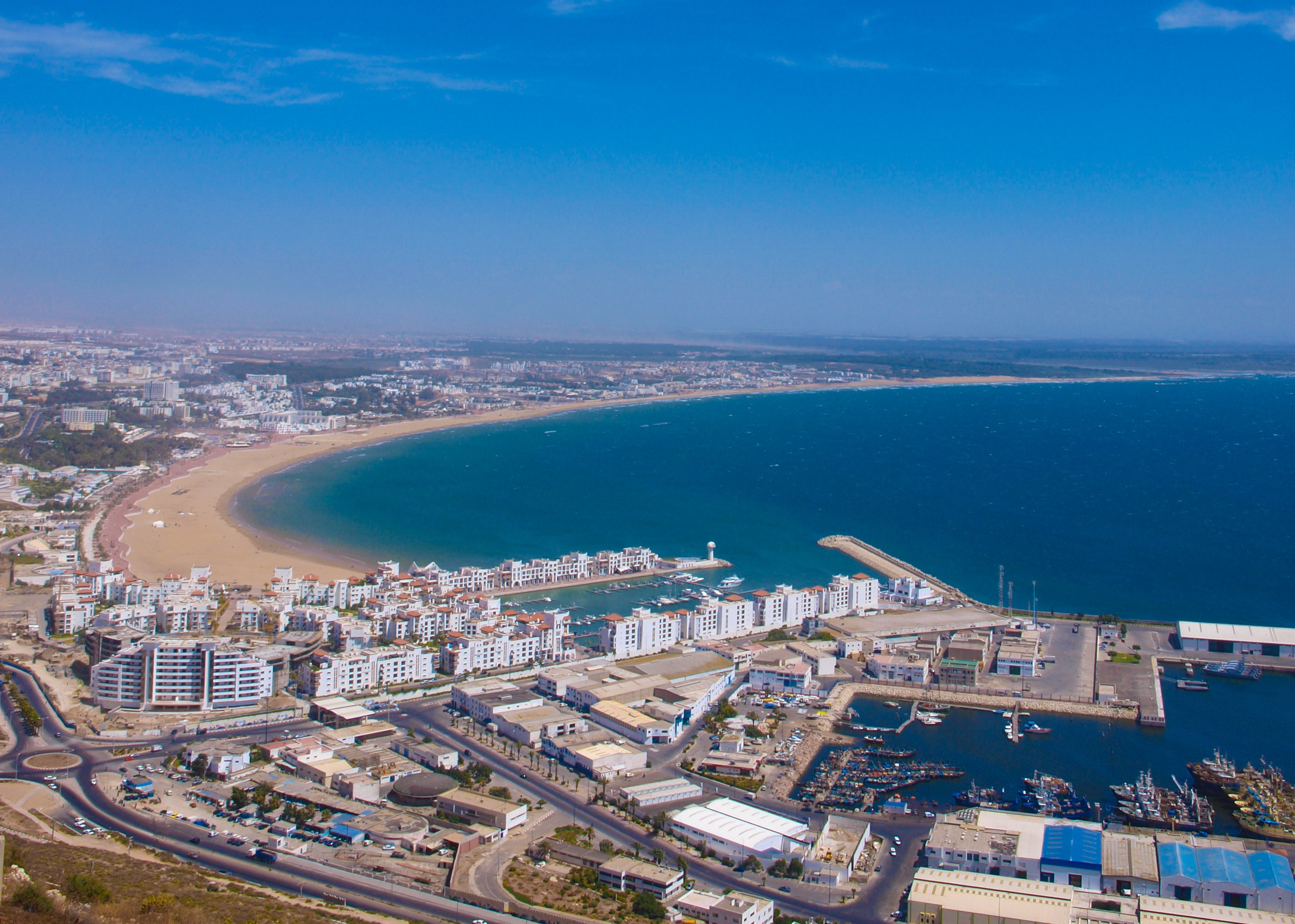
An aerial view of Agadir, Morocco

- Agadir
- Essaouira
- Saïdia

== Mozambique ==
- Vamizi Island

== Myanmar ==
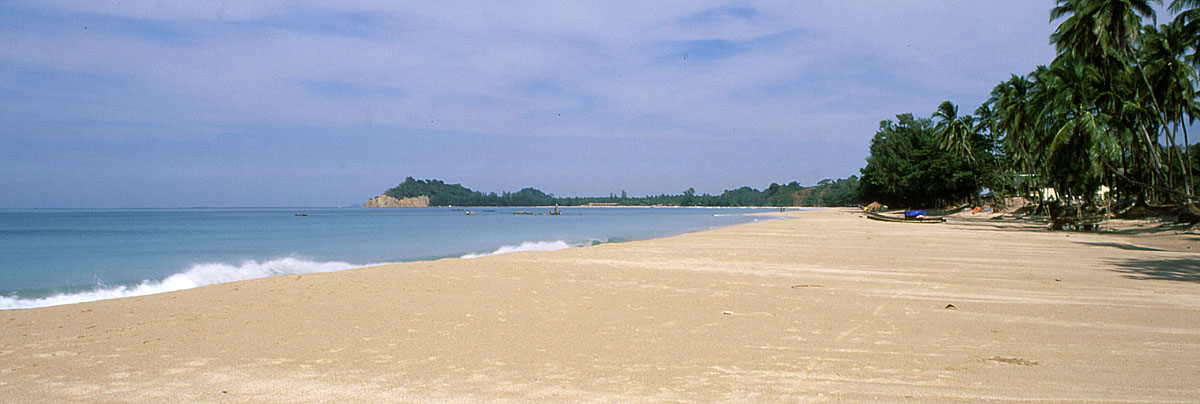
Ngapali Beach, Myanmar

- Chaungtha Beach, Ayeyarwady Region
- Kanthaya Beach, Rakhine State
- Maungmagan Beach, Tanintharyi Region
- Ngapali Beach, Rakhine State
- Ngwesaung Beach, Ayeyarwady Region
- Sittwe Beach, Rakhine State

== Netherlands ==
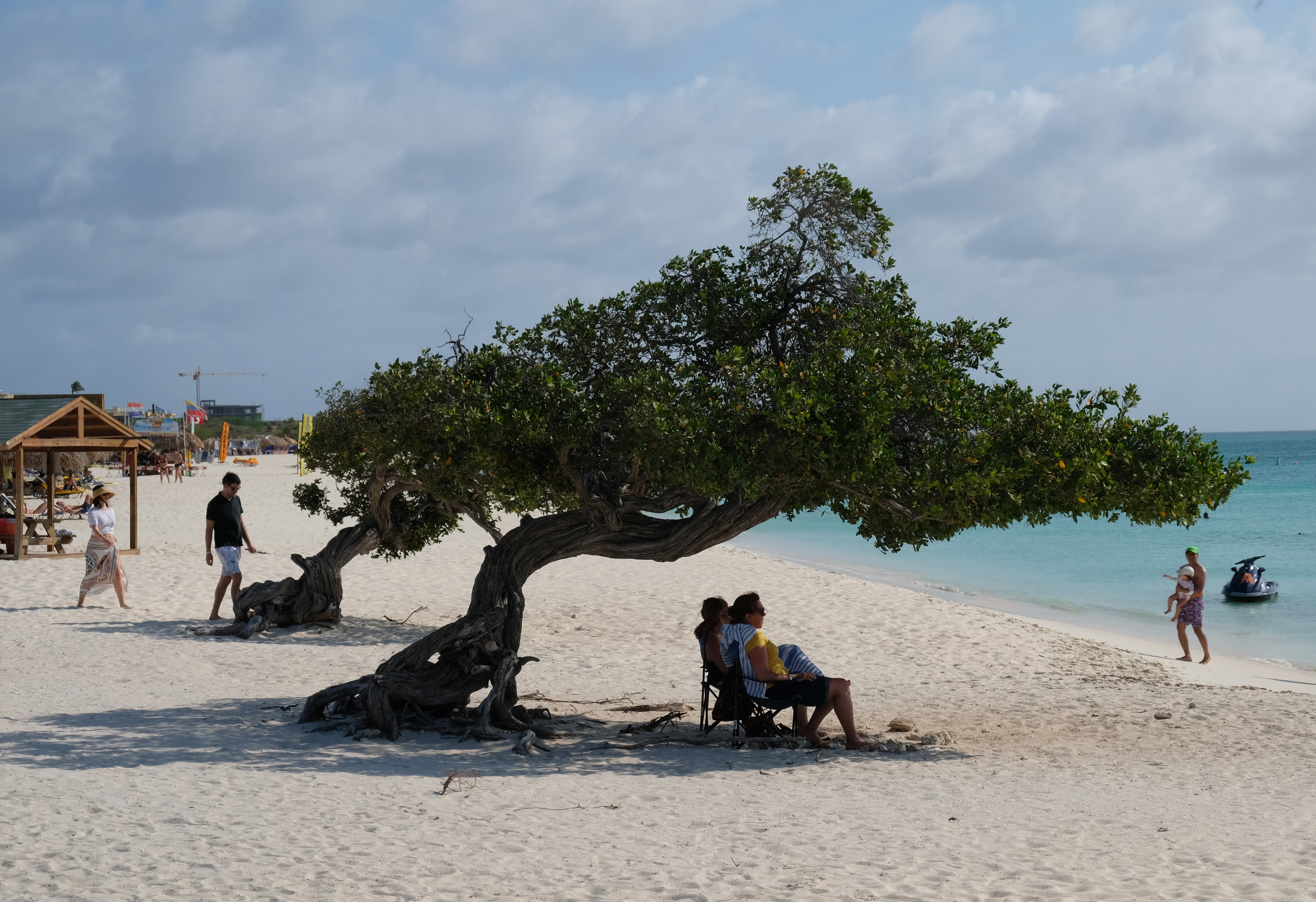
Eagle Beach in Aruba

- Katwijk aan zee
- Maarsseveense plassen
- Noordwijk
- Scheveningen
- Zandvoort aan zee

=== Aruba ===
- Eagle Beach
- Palm Beach

=== Curacao ===
- Coconut beach

== New Zealand ==
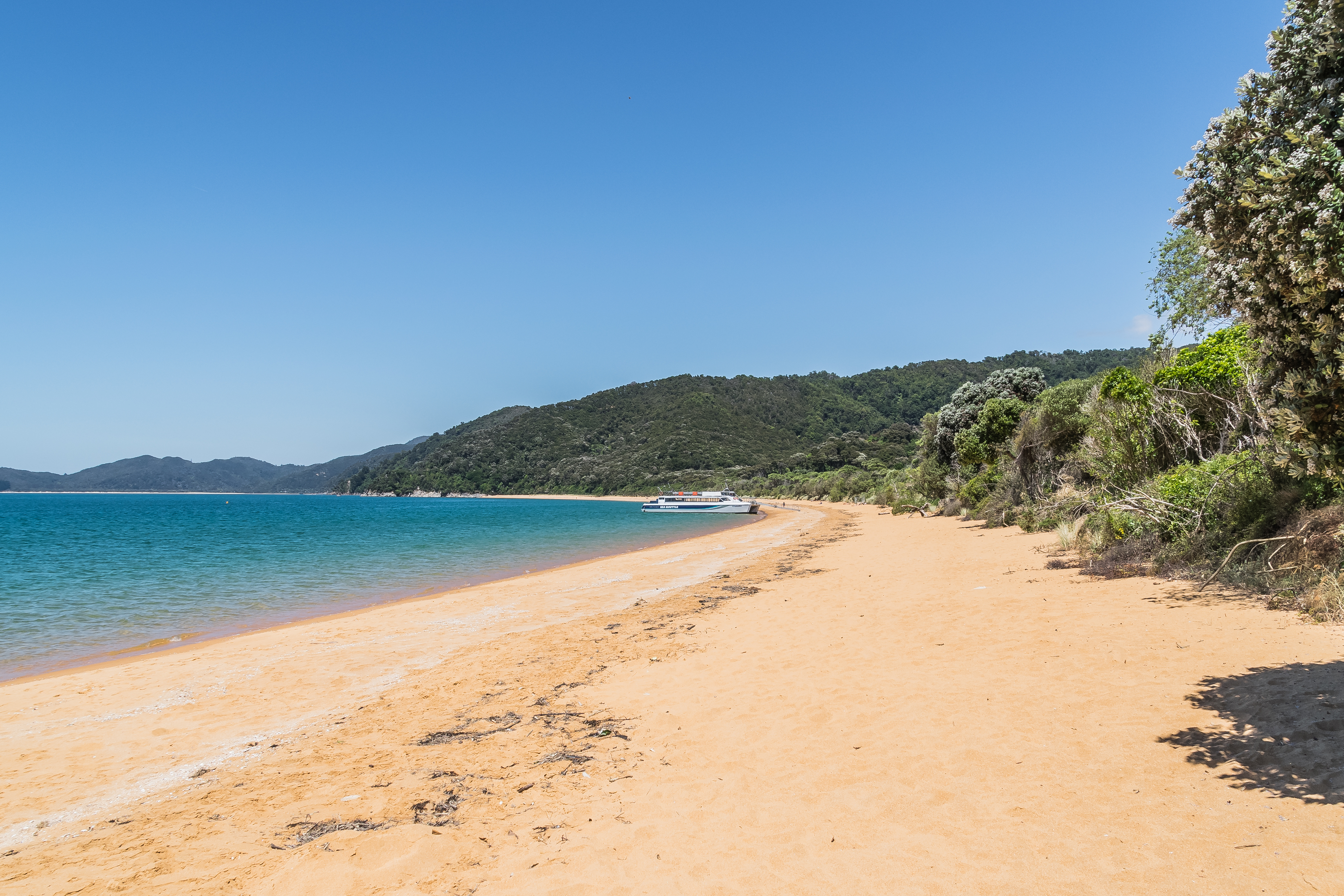
Tōtaranui Beach in Abel Tasman National Park, New Zealand

- Allans Beach
- Anawhata
- Bayleys Beach
- Boulder Beach
- Breaker Bay
- Carters Beach
- Golden Bay
- Hot Water Beach
- Karekare
- Matapouri
- Muriwai
- Ninety Mile Beach
- Ocean Beach, Hawke's Bay
- Oreti Beach
- Papamoa
- Paraparaumu Beach
- Peka Peka
- Piha
- Red Beach
- St Clair and St Kilda Beaches, Dunedin
- Sandfly Bay
- Smaills Beach
- Snells Beach
- Te Henga (Bethells Beach)
- Tomahawk Beach
- Tunnel Beach
- Uretiti Beach
- Victory Beach
- Waihi Beach
- Whangarei Heads
- Whareakeake (Murdering Beach)
- Whatipu
- Worser Bay

== Nicaragua ==
- Playa Escameca
- Playa el Yonke

== Nigeria ==
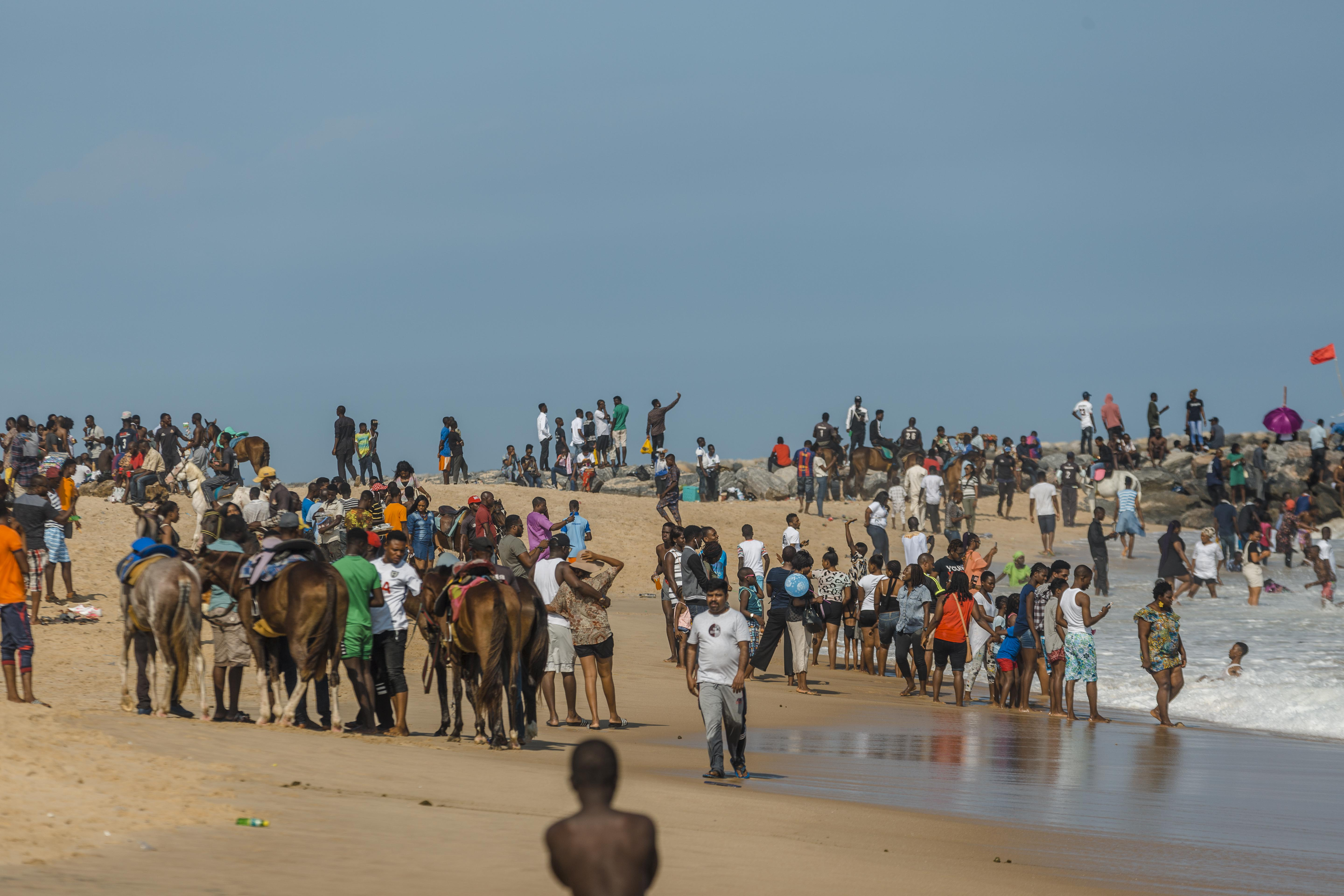
Elegushi Beach, Nigeria

- Bar Beach, Lagos
- Elegushi Beach
- Kuramo Beach
- Port Harcourt Tourist Beach

== Norway ==
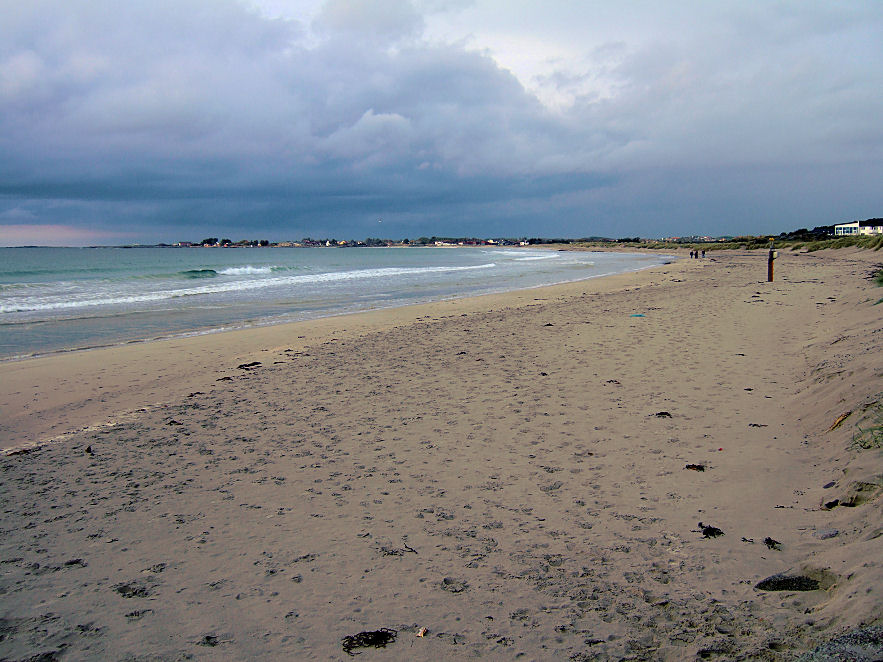
Solastranda, Sola Municipality, Norway

- Bleik
- Bystranda
- Hamresanden
- Hove
- Huk
- Hvervenbukta
- Mølen
- Møllebukta
- Sjøsanden
- Solastranda
- Vesterøya beaches

== Oman ==
- Al Sawadi
- Sur Beaches

== Pakistan ==
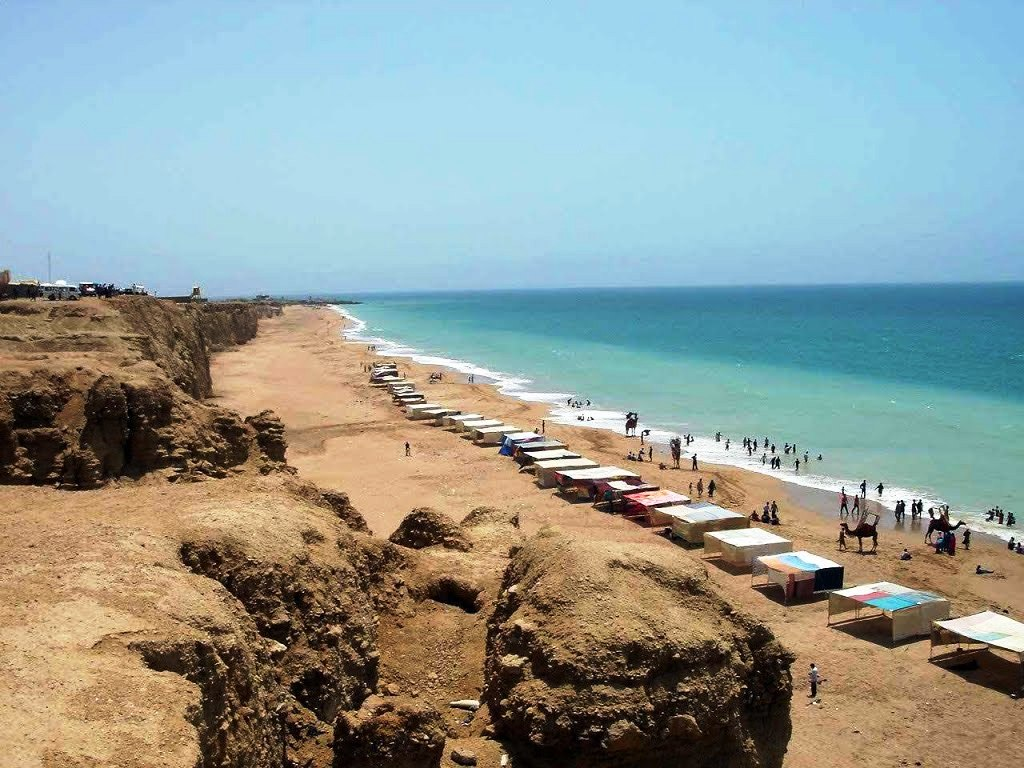
Hawke's Bay Beach in Karachi, Pakistan

- Astola Island
- Cape Monze
- Clifton Beach
- French Beach
- Gadani Beach
- Gwadar Beach
- Hawke's Bay
- Ibrahim Hyderi
- Jiwani Bay
- Korangi Creek
- Kund Malir
- Manora Beach
- Nathia Gali Beach
- Ormara Beach
- Ormara Turtle Beaches
- Paradise Point
- Sandspit Beach

== Panama ==
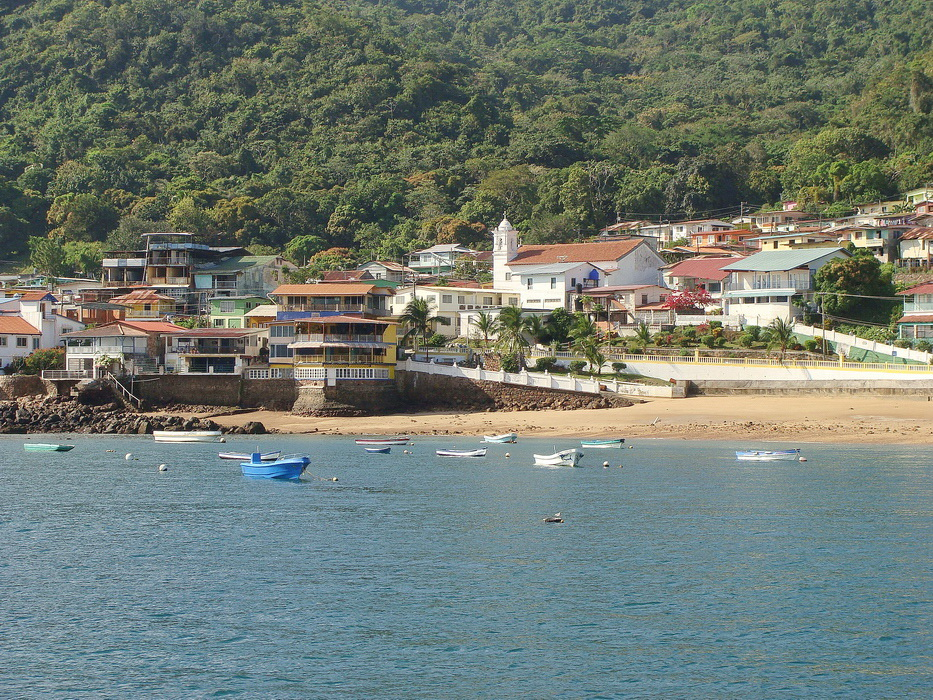
View of Taboga Island, Panama

Caribbean Coast

- Isla Grande

Pacific Coast

- Taboga

== Peru ==
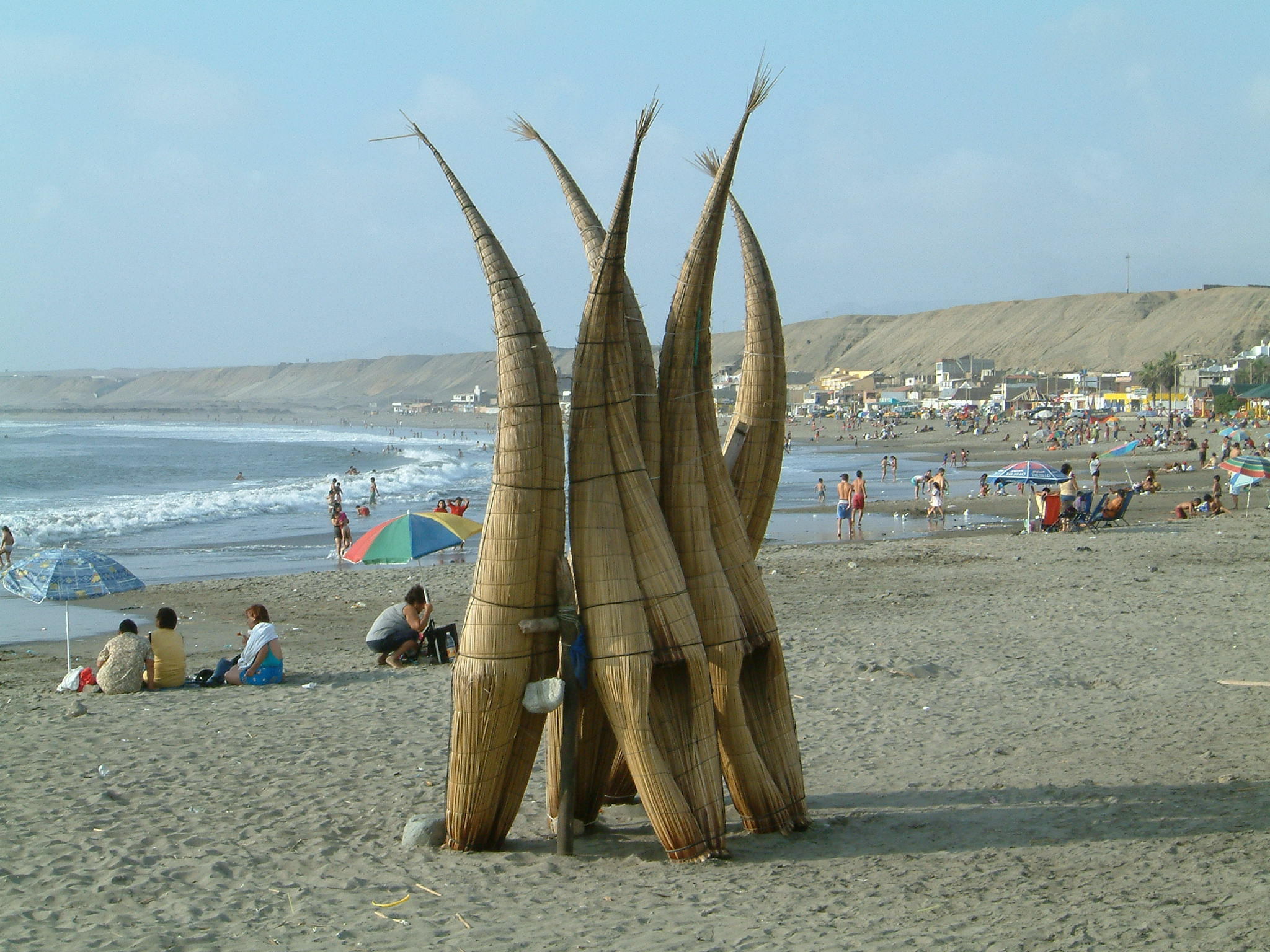
Reed fishing boats at Huanchaco

- Agua Dulce, Lima
- Ancón, Lima
- Arica, Lima
- Barranco, Lima
- Barranquito, Lima
- Bolivia Mar, Ilo
- Buenos Aires, Trujillo
- Cabo Blanco, El Alto
- Chérrepe, Pueblo Nuevo
- Contralmirante Villar, Tumbes
- El Silencio, Lima
- Huanchaco, Trujillo
- Makaha, Lima
- Malabrigo, Trujillo
- Máncora, Piura
- La Estrella, Lima
- La Herradura, Lima
- La Pampilla, Lima
- La Punta, Callao
- Las Delicias, Trujillo
- Los Pavos, Lima
- Pacasmayo, Pacasmayo
- Puerto Morín, Virú
- Punta Hermosa, Lima
- Punta Roquitas, Lima
- Punta Sal, Tumbes
- Redondo, Lima
- Salaverry, Trujillo
- Santa María del Mar, Lima
- Waikiki, Lima

== Puerto Rico ==
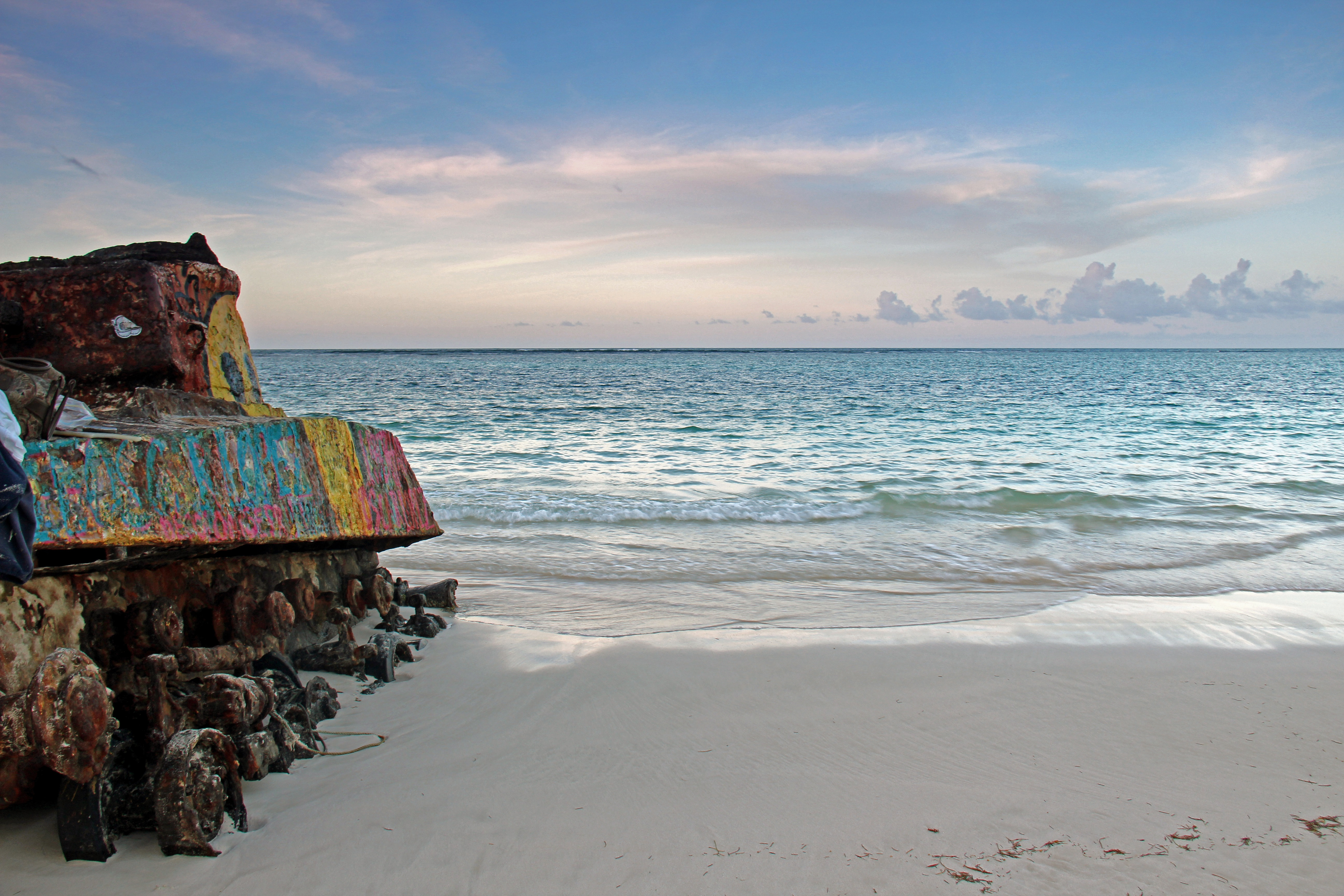
Flamenco Beach in Puerto Rico is consistently ranked among the best beaches in the world.

- Crash Boat Beach
- Flamenco Beach
- Playa Jobos
- Luquillo Beach
- El Tuque Beach
- La Guancha Beach
- Pelicano Beach
- Ensenadita Beach
- Larga Beach
- Blanca Beach
- Guardia Costanera Beach
- Carrucho Beach
- Club Nautico Beach
- Ponce Beach

== Romania ==
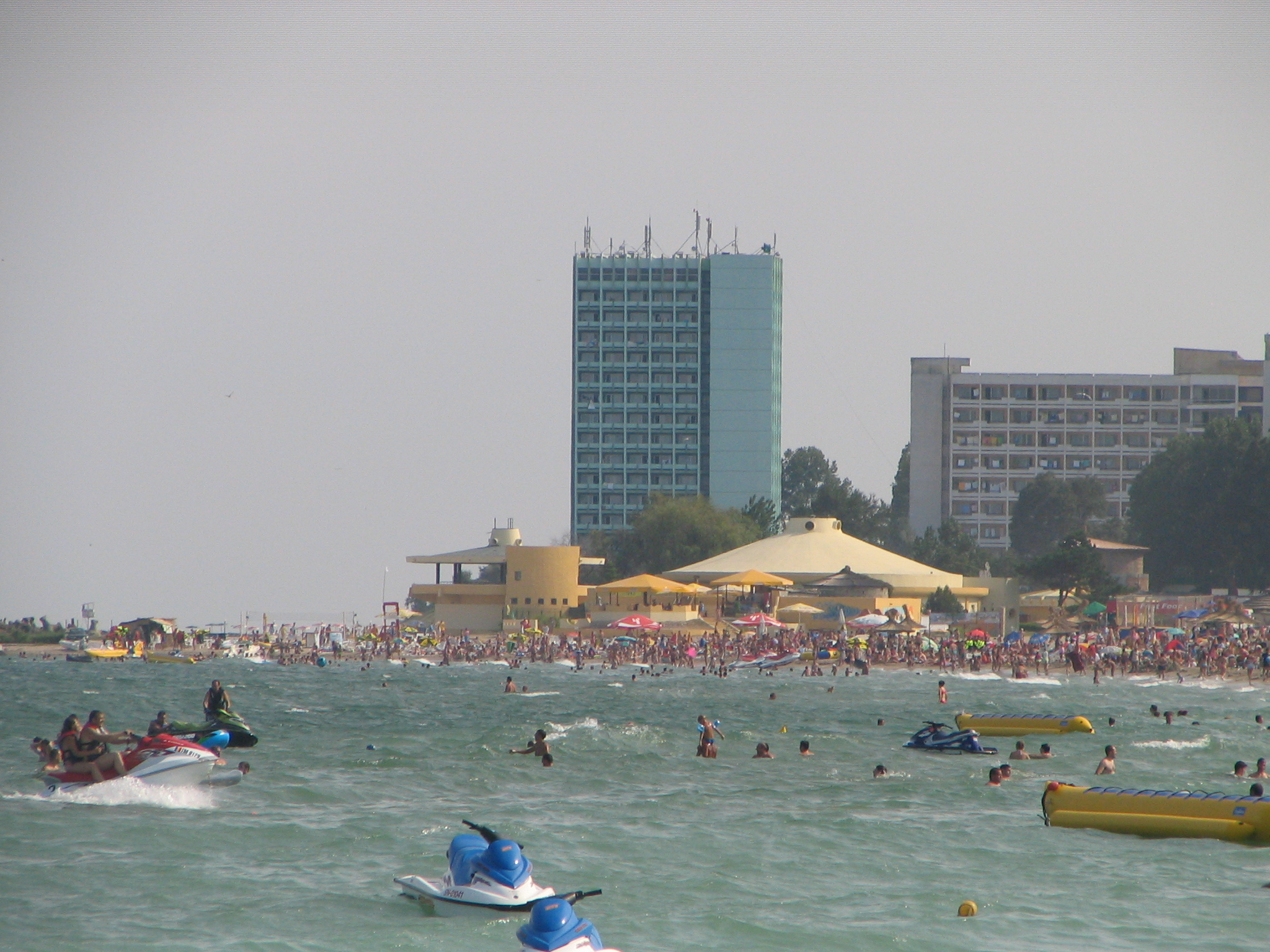
The beach at Neptun, Romania

- Cap Aurora
- Costinesti
- Eforie Nord
- Eforie Sud
- Jupiter
- Mamaia
- Mangalia
- Navodari
- Neptun
- Olimp
- Saturn
- Venus

== Russia ==
- Curonian Spit
- Lazurnaya Bay
- Zelenogradsk

== Saint Kitts and Nevis ==
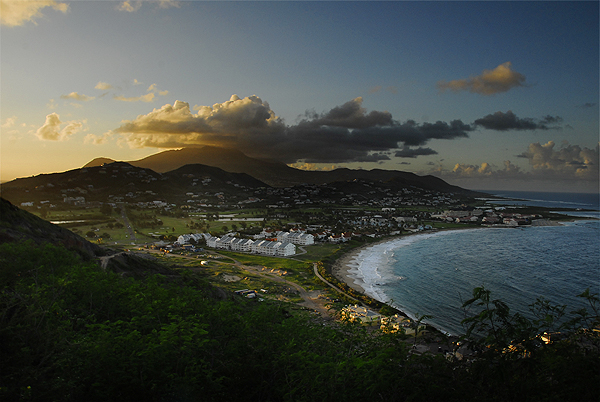
Frigate Bay, Saint Kitts

- Frigate Bay, Saint Kitts
- Pinney's Beach, Nevis

== Saint Lucia ==
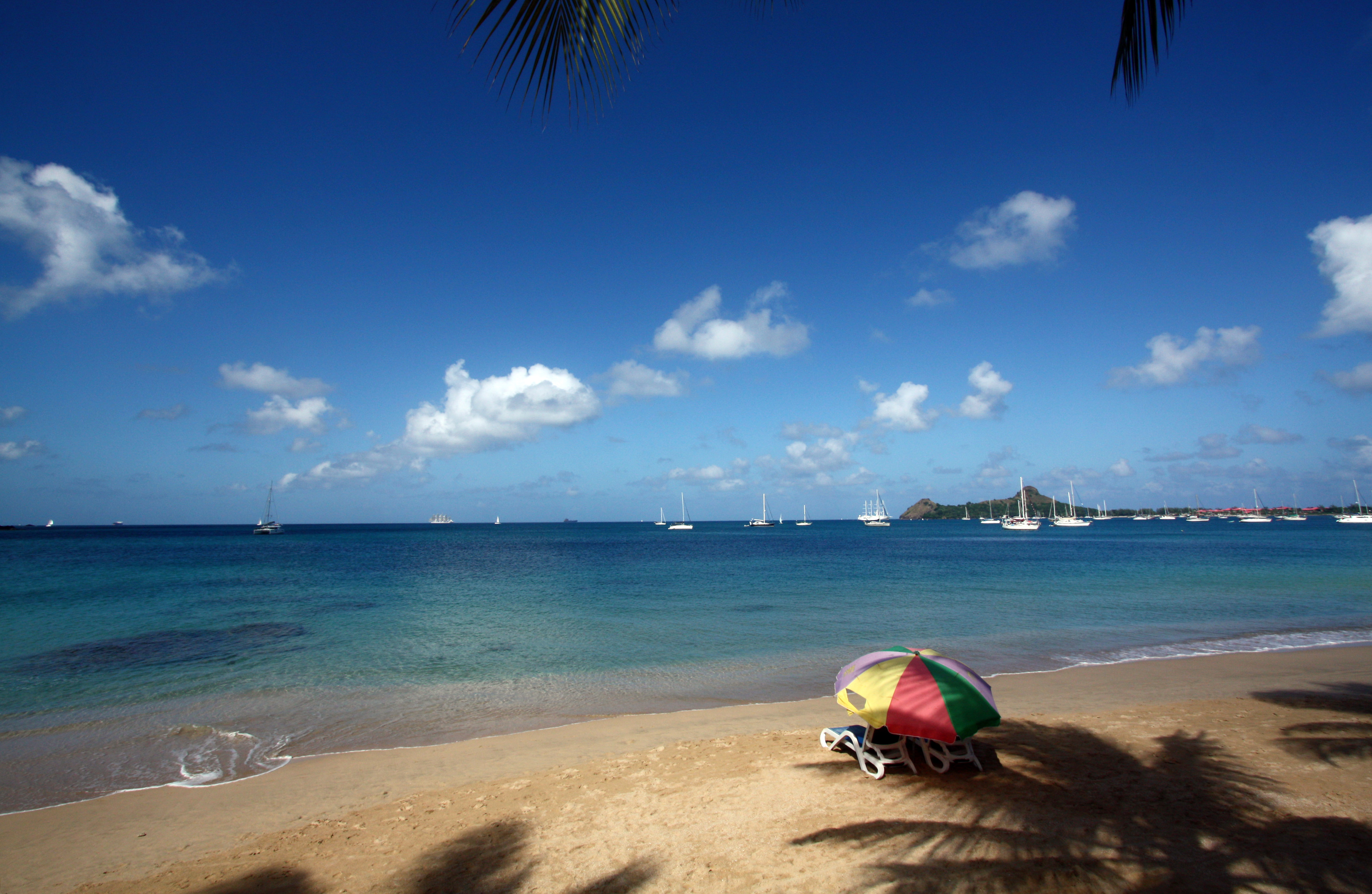
Reduit Beach

The following are some of the most popular and well known beaches in the island nation of Saint Lucia:

- Anse Chastanet beach on Chastanet Bay in Soufrière District
- Anse Cochon beach on Cochon Bay in Canaries District
- Anse de Sables beach in Vieux Fort District
- Anse Louvet beach in Dennery District
- Anse Mamin on Anse Bay in Soufrière District
- Grande Anse beach in Gros Islet District
- Laborie Bay in Laborie District
- Marigot Bay in Castries District
- Pigeon Island beach in Gros Islet District
- Reduit Beach, Rodney Bay in Gros Islet District
- La Toc Beach in Castries District
- Vigie Beach, near the George F. L. Charles Airport in Castries District

== Saint Vincent and the Grenadines ==
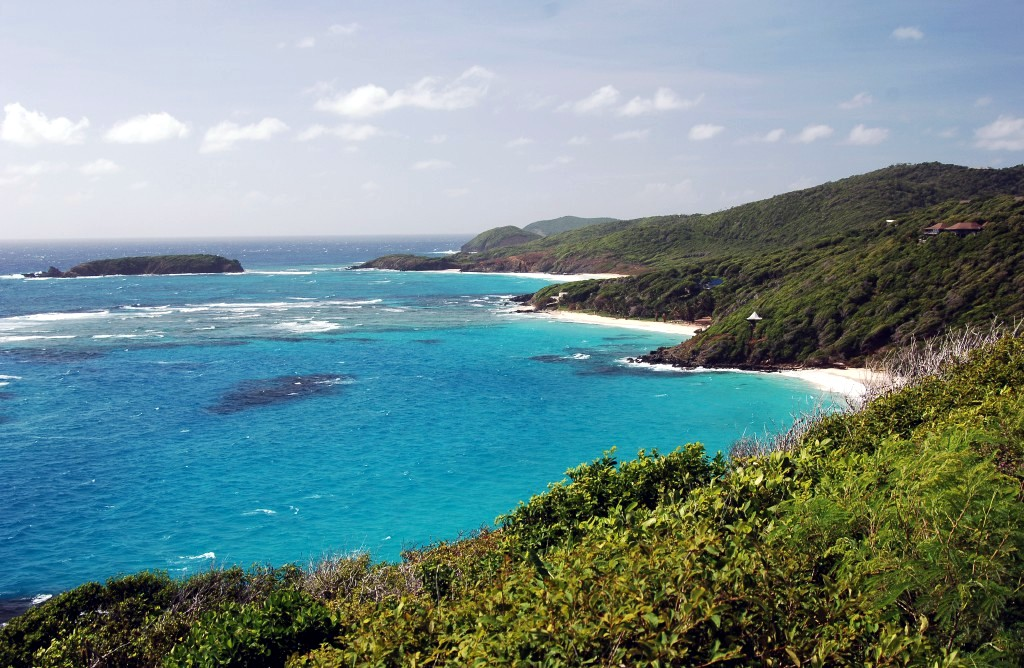
Beaches on the east coast of Mustique

- Mustique

== Serbia ==
- Ada Ciganlija, Belgrade
- Bela Stena, Pančevo
- Lido, Belgrade
- Štrand, Novi Sad

== Seychelles ==
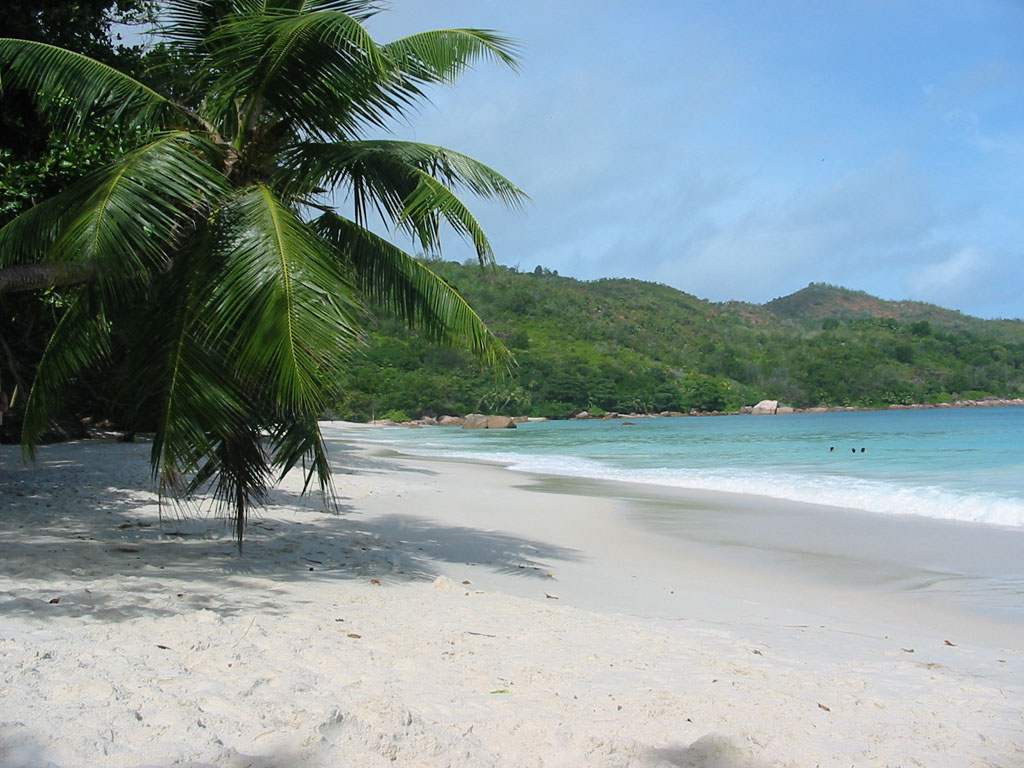
Anse Lazio, Praslin Island, Seychelles

- Anse Lazio

== Singapore ==
- Changi Beach Park
- East Coast Park
- Palawan Beach, Siloso Beach & Tanjong Beach
- West Coast Park

== Spain ==
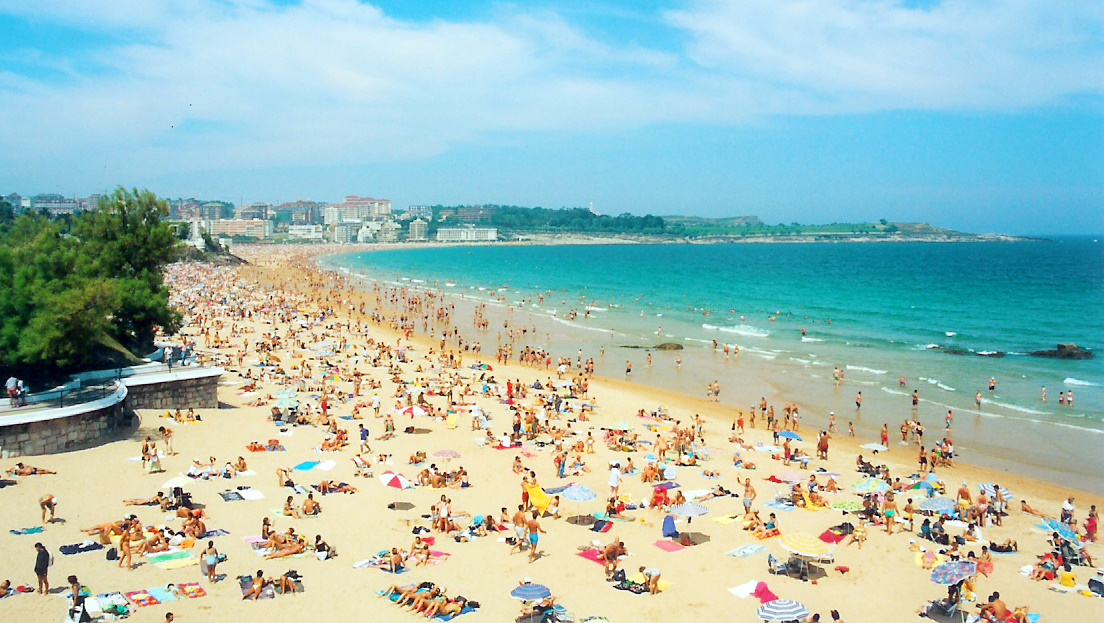
The beach of Sardinero, Santander, Spain

== Sweden ==
- Laholm Bay Beach
- Skrea strand

== Taiwan ==
- Baisha Bay
- Qixingtan Beach
- Fulong Beach
- Neipi Beach
- South Bay
- Yanliao Beach Park

== Tanzania ==
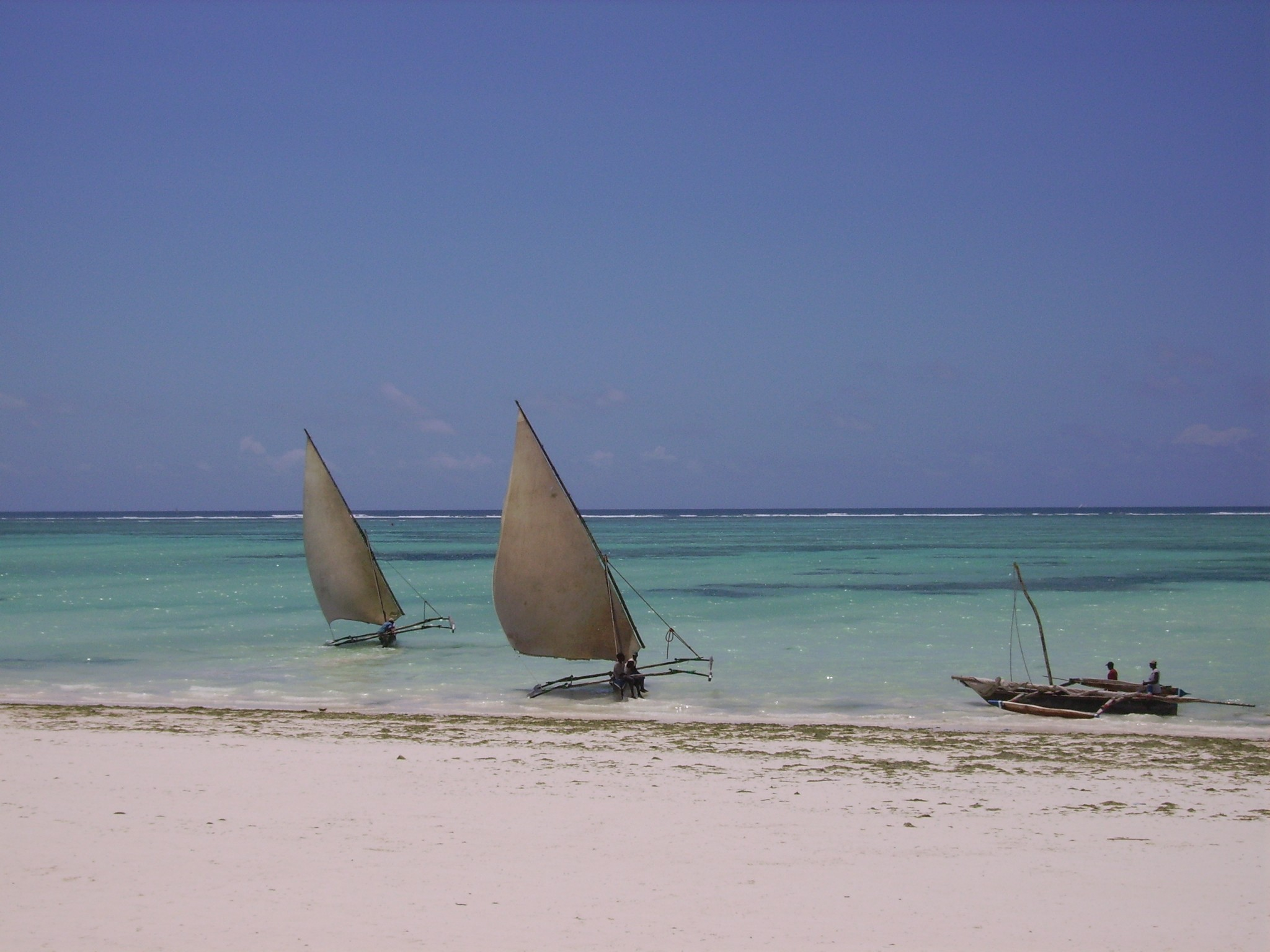
A beach in Zanzibar, Tanzania

- Zanzibar

== Thailand ==
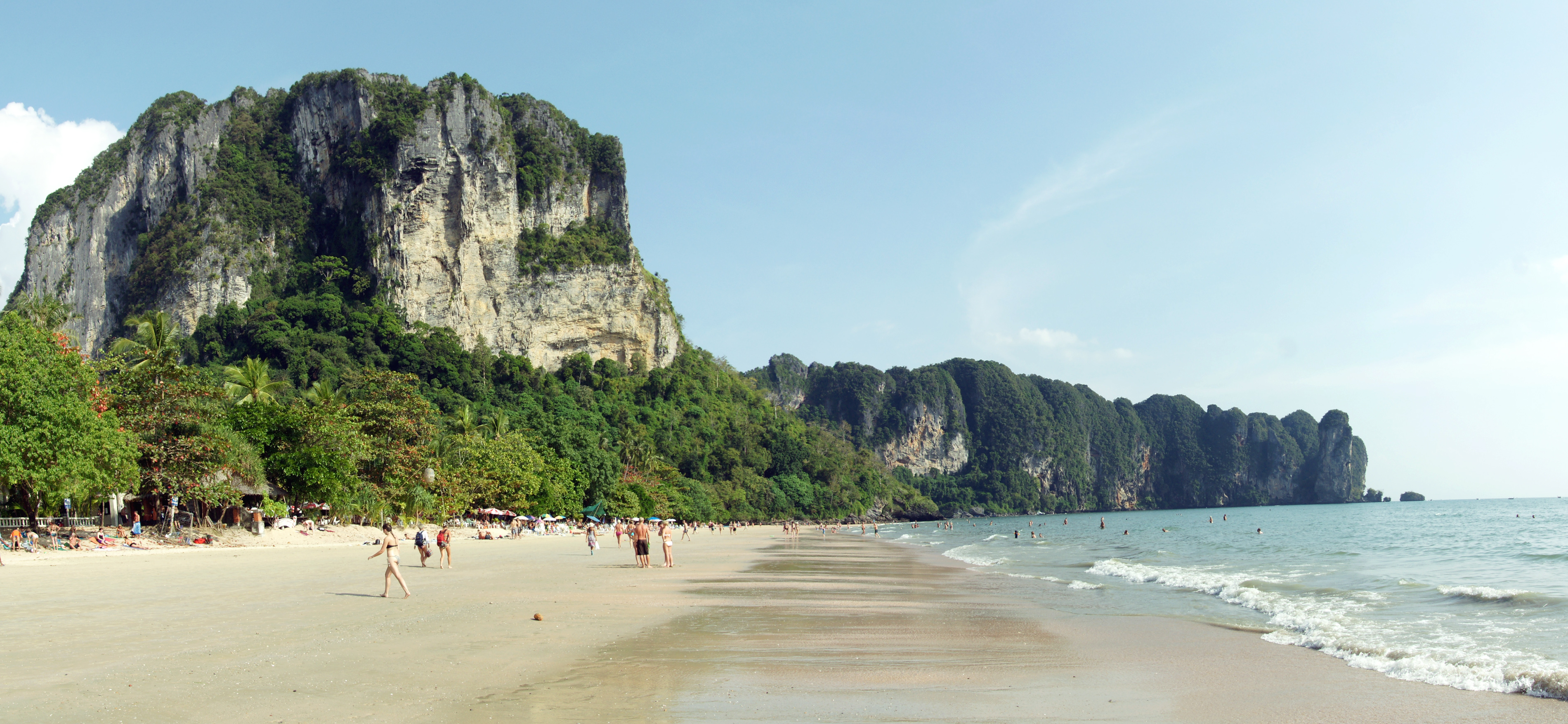
Ao Nang beach, Thailand

- Ao Nang, Krabi
- Haad Rin
- Ko Phi Phi Don
- Ko Phi Phi Leh
- Ko Tarutao
- Pattaya
- Phuket

== Tonga ==
- Ha'apai

== Trinidad and Tobago ==
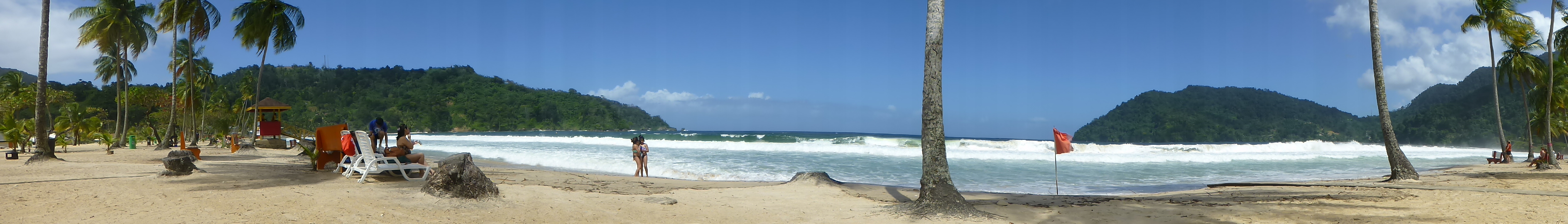
Maracas Beach, Trinidad

- Cedros, Trinidad
- Chaguaramas, Trinidad
- Manzanilla Beach, Trinidad
- Maracas Beach, Trinidad
- Mayaro Bay, Trinidad
- Toco, Trinidad
- Englishman's Bay, Tobago
- Pigeon Point, Tobago

== Tunisia ==
- Sounine

== Turkey ==
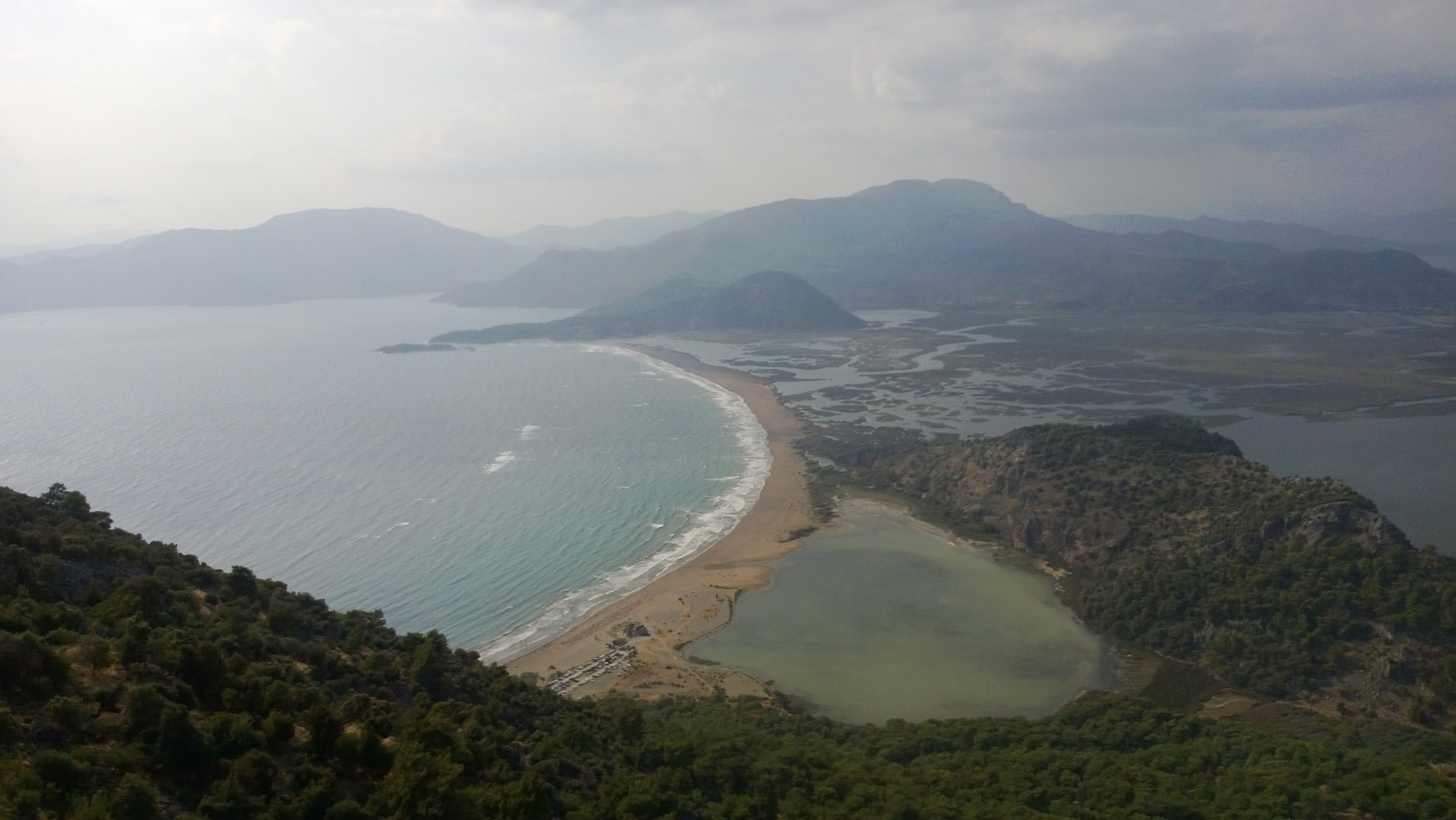
İztuzu Beach, Turkey

== Ukraine ==
- Arcadia Beach, Odesa (Odesa Oblast)
- Hydropark, Kyiv
- Trukhaniv Island, Kyiv

== United States ==
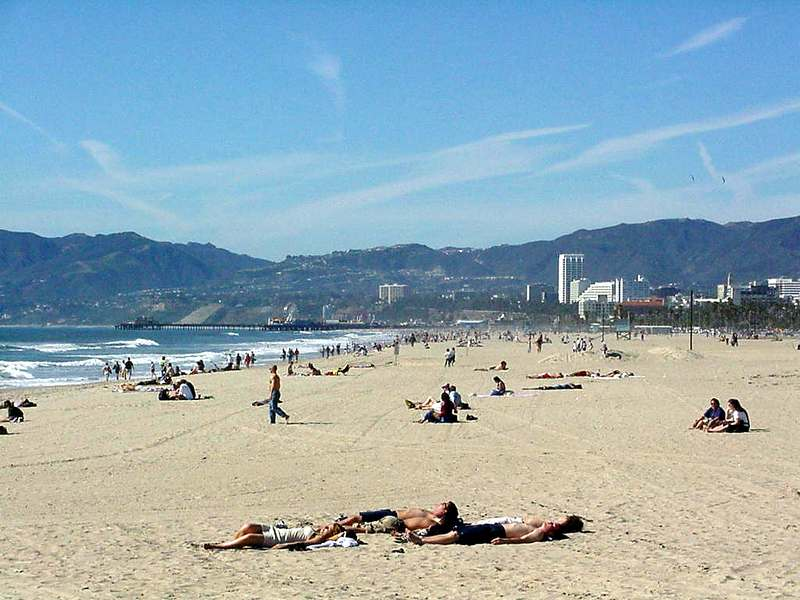
Due to its prominent role in many Hollywood movies, Venice Beach, California is one of the most widely recognized beaches in the world.

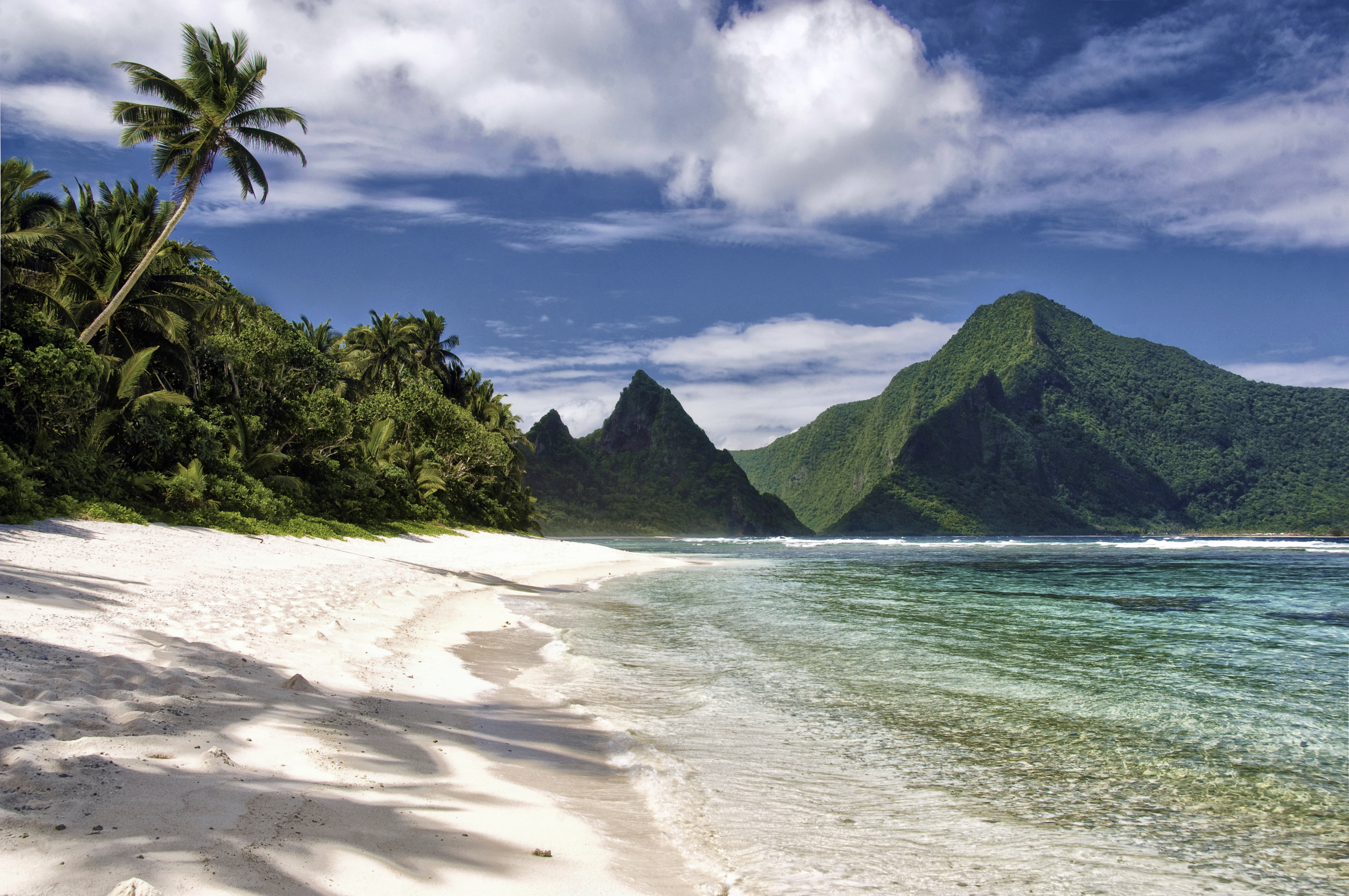
Ofu Beach in American Samoa National Park, United States

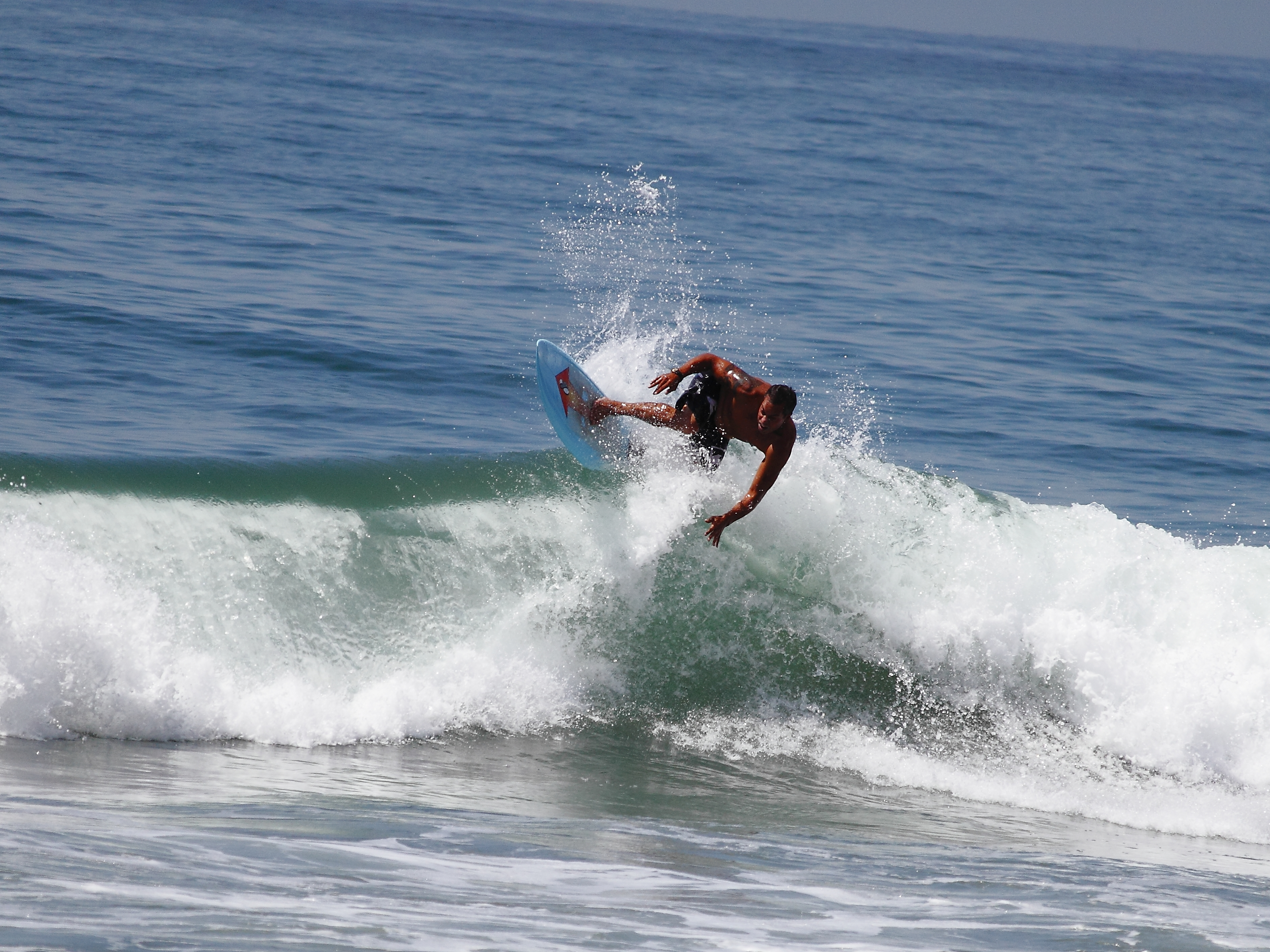
A surfer rides the break at Sunset Beach, California

=== Pacific Coast ===
- Cannon Beach, Oregon
- Carlsbad State Beach, California
- Carmel-by-the-Sea, California
- Corona del Mar State Beach, California
- D.T. Fleming Beach, Hawaii
- Ecola State Park, Oregon
- El Capitán Beach, California
- Half Moon Beach, California
- Laguna Beach, California
- Ofu Beach, American Samoa
- Polihale Beach, Hawaii
- Secret Beach, Hawaii
- Sunset Beach, California
- Waikiki, Hawaii

=== Southeast ===
- Atlantic Beach, North Carolina
- Cape Hatteras, North Carolina
- Caswell Beach, North Carolina
- Clearwater Beach, Florida
- Daytona Beach, Florida
- Hilton Head Island, South Carolina
- Jacksonville Beach, Florida
- Key Largo, Florida
- Key West, Florida
- Kiawah Island, South Carolina
- Marco Island, Florida
- Miami Beach, Florida
- Myrtle Beach, South Carolina
- Oak Island, North Carolina
- Sea Island, Georgia
- Siesta Key Beach, Florida
- Wrightsville Beach, North Carolina

=== East Coast ===
- Acadia National Park, Maine
- Cape May, New Jersey
- Craigville Beach, Massachusetts
- Fairfield Beach, Connecticut
- Fire Island, New York
- Montauk, New York
- Ocean City, New Jersey
- Ocean Grove, New Jersey
- Seaside Heights, New Jersey

== Uruguay ==
- La Pedrera, Rocha
- Malvín
- Piriápolis
- Pocitos
- Punta del Este

== Vietnam ==
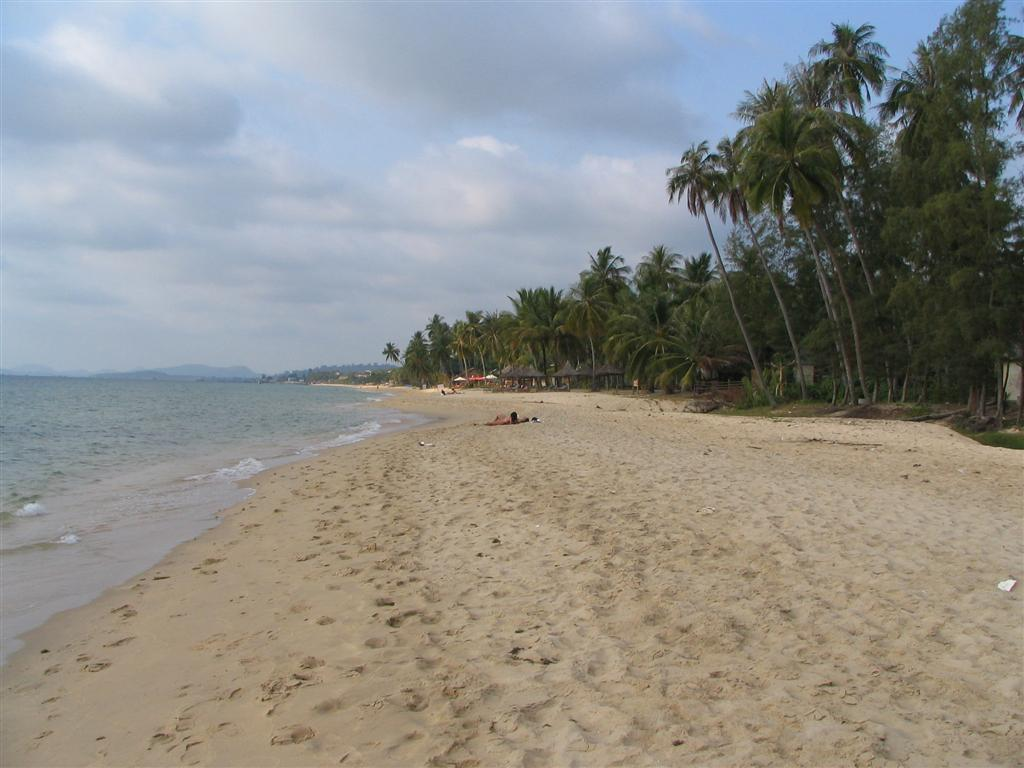
A beach at Phú Quốc, Vietnam

- Hạ Long Bay, Quảng Ninh Province
- Hội An, Quảng Nam Province
- Mũi Né, Bình Thuận Province
- Nha Trang, Khánh Hòa Province
- Phan Thiết, Bình Thuận Province
- Phú Quốc, Kiên Giang Province
- Vũng Tàu, Bà Rịa–Vũng Tàu province

== See also ==
- Beach evolution
- Coast
- Coastal geography
- List of environment topics
- List of seaside resorts
- List of tourist attractions worldwide
- Nude beach
- Shore
- Urban beach
