= Tomahawk Beach =

Beach on the Pacific Ocean in Dunedin, New Zealand

- Beach
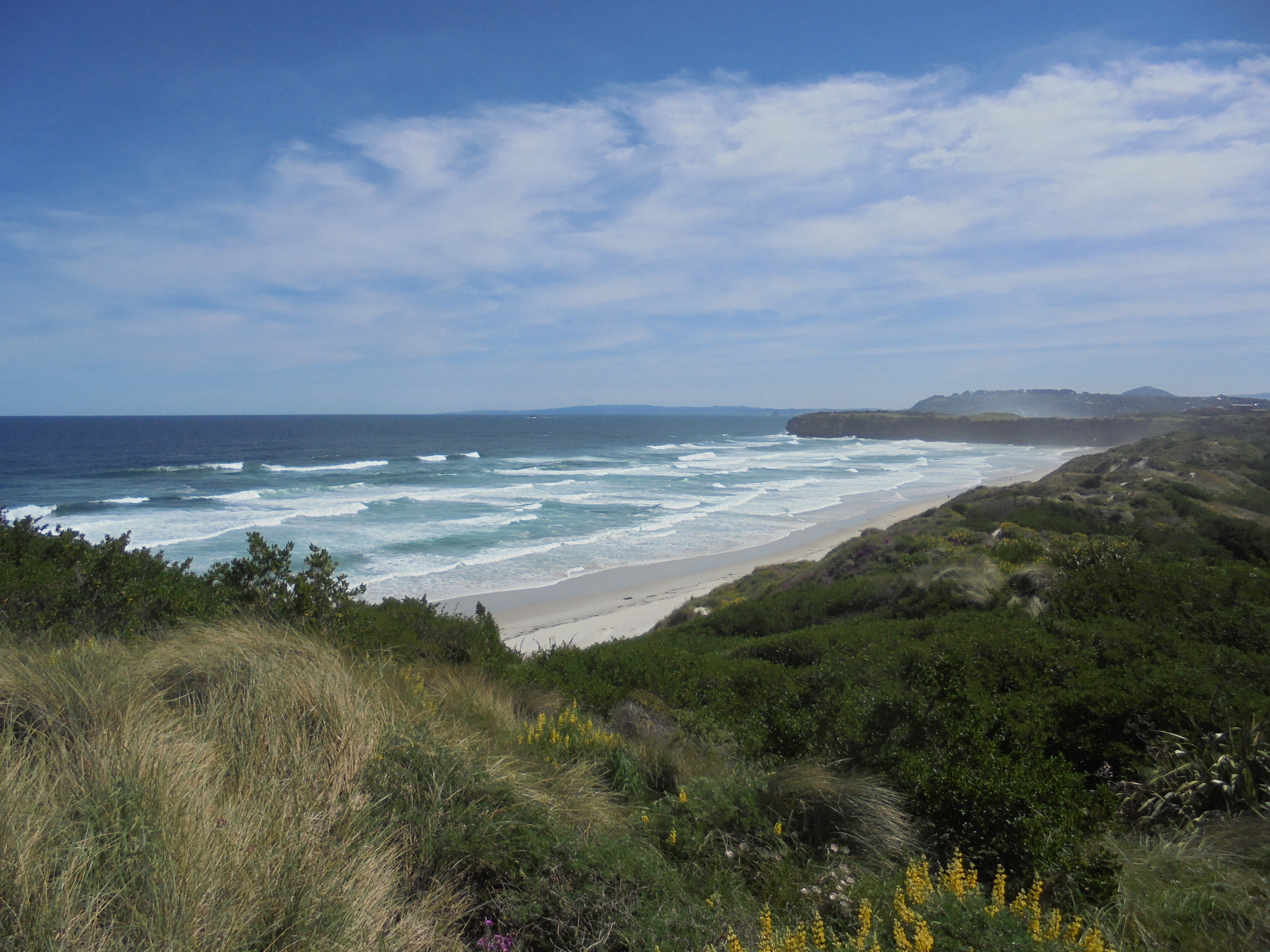
- Tomahawk Beach from the northeast, showing Lawyers Head
- Interactive map of Tomahawk Beach
- Coordinates: 45°54′25″S 170°32′42″E
- Location: Dunedin, New Zealand

Tomahawk Beach is a beach on the Pacific Ocean 7.5 kilometres (4.7 mi) southeast of the city centre of Dunedin, New Zealand. Located within the Ocean Grove Reserve between St Kilda Beach and Smaills Beach, at the point where Otago Peninsula joins the mainland of the South Island, Tomahawk Beach is a white sand beach popular with casual beach-goers and dog-walkers as well as surfers. Sand is extracted from the Tomahawk Lagoon channel, which runs across the beach, for commercial purposes and to prevent flooding.

== Name ==
The word "Tomahawk", documented in the Otago Witness from 1852, is unlikely to be a reference to the weapon; it is more likely an anglicized form of the Māori words toma haka. Toma means a place of bones, or shrine for bones; haka is commonly taken to refer to the Māori dance of challenge (hence the interpretation "dance by a gravesite"), but may instead represent the Southern Māori form of the word hanga, to build or create. However, there are no known pre-European burial sites or reported finds of human bones in the area.

== Physical geography ==
Tomahawk Beach is approximately 1 kilometre (0.62 mi) long and faces due south. To the west the beach is bounded by the cliffs of Lawyers Head, beyond which lies Ocean Beach, Dunedin's most popular beach (the near end of which is referred to as "St Kilda Beach"). Approximately 100 metres (330 ft) east of the cliffs Tomahawk Beach is divided by the outlet channel of Tomahawk Lagoon; the beach's main access track runs along the dunes immediately above this channel. To the east, Tomahawk is separated from Smaills Beach by Tomahawk Bluff, a small promontory of black volcanic rock punctuated by sea caves, on the top of which stands the Jack Fox Lookout. At very low tides the base of the promontory is exposed, making Tomahawk and Smaills effectively a single beach. Northward, the beach rises into scrub-covered dunes and a steep slope leading up to the suburb of Ocean Grove. The beach slopes strongly southward between the tide lines but flattens out below the low tide mark. The swell is usually strong. Both headlands are associated with rip currents and there is usually a rip current near the middle of the beach.

=== Wildlife ===
Tomahawk Beach is sometimes visited by yellow-eyed penguins, little blue penguins, New Zealand sea lions, and rarely crabeater seals. Visitors are advised to take care and keep their distance, for the sake of these animals' safety and, in the case of the sea lions, their own. Red-billed gulls and black-backed gulls are often seen on the beach.

=== Environmental concerns ===
Wind erosion of the sand dunes is a concern at Tomahawk Beach as for much of the adjacent coastline. The Dunedin City Council is addressing this concern by an ongoing programme of contouring and revegetation, through a memorandum of understanding with the Tomahawk Smaills Beachcare Trust.

At the western end of the beach the water is periodically found to be polluted from the outfall of the nearby Tahuna wastewater treatment plant.

== Social geography ==
=== History ===
Prior to European colonisation, Smaills and Tomahawk Beaches formed part of a walking track for Māori travelling between Ōtākou and Tomahawk Lagoon.

In 1897 the local area including both Smaills and Tomahawk Beaches was classified as a government reserve, and in 1931 it was formally established as the Ocean Grove Reserve.

=== Current use ===
Tomahawk Beach is popular with beachgoers seeking to avoid the crowds of neighbouring Ocean Beach, and can be surfed on all tides, though – due to the risk of sewage pollution – surfing is more popular at the eastern end. It is particularly favoured by dog walkers. Tomahawk Beach was not patrolled by lifeguards until January 2018.

Most classes of motor vehicle are banned from Dunedin beaches by the Reserves and Beaches Bylaw 2017. Both before and after the passing of the bylaw, Tomahawk has been the site of multiple vehicle strandings in the rising tide.

Sand is extracted in small quantities from the Tomahawk Lagoon outlet under permit from the Otago Regional Council. In addition to commercial benefit, it is argued that this reduces the risk of flooding in the lagoon.
