= Ocean Grove, New Zealand =

Suburb of Dunedin, New Zealand

Ocean Grove
- Suburb
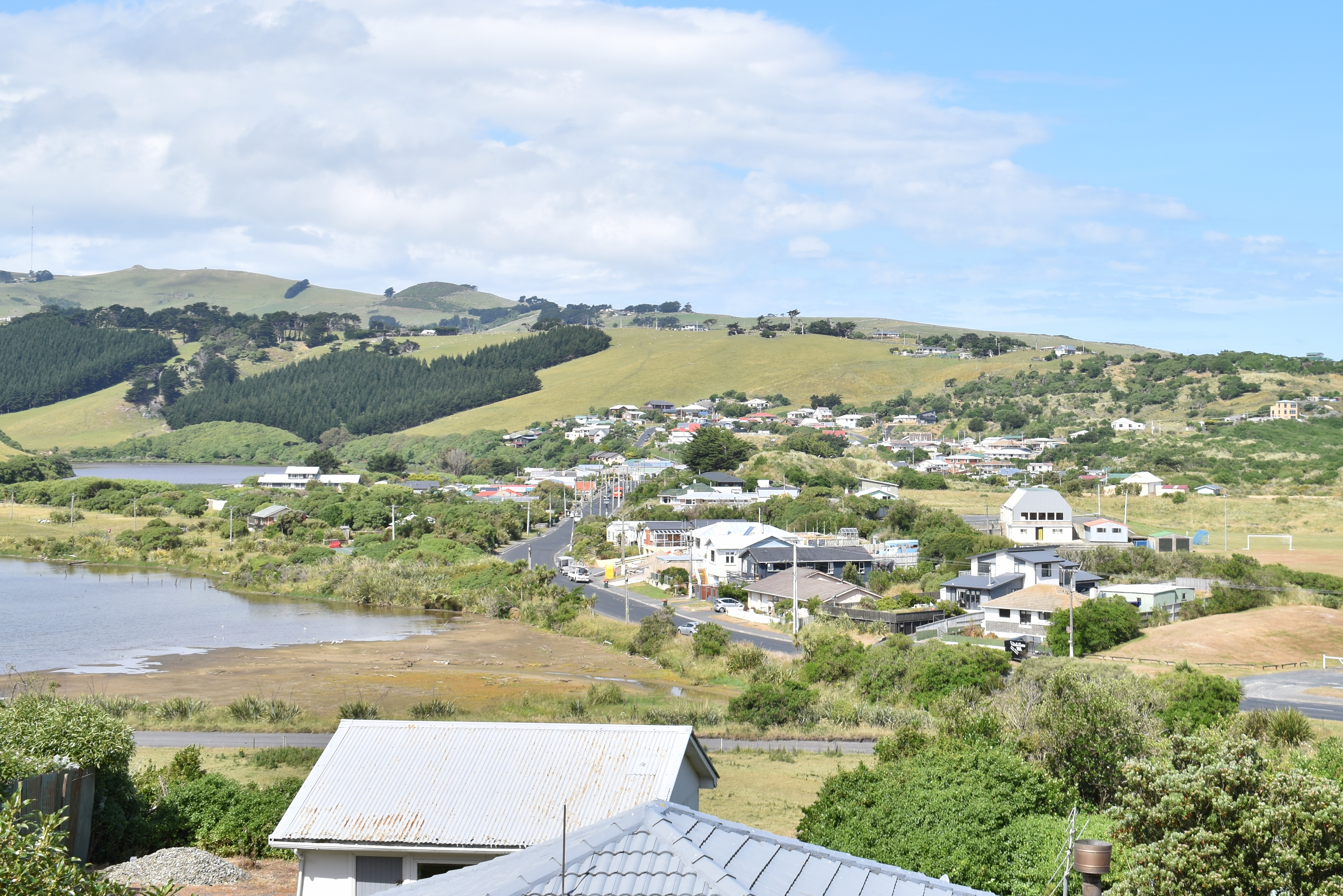
- Ocean Grove sits close to the southern shore of Tomahawk Lagoon's two lobes- the Bottom Lagoon is visible at the lower left, and the Top Lagoon can be seen behind it.
- Interactive map of Ocean Grove
- Coordinates: 45.9033°S 170.5479°E
- Country: New Zealand
- City: Dunedin
- Local authority: Dunedin City Council

Area
  - Land: 64 ha (160 acres)

Population (2018 Census)
  - Total: 441
  - Density: 690/km^{2} (1,800/sq mi)

Andersons Bay	Shiel Hill
Tainui, New Zealand	Ocean Grove
	Tomahawk Beach	Smaills Beach

Ocean Grove, also known as Tomahawk, is a suburb in the southeast of the New Zealand city of Dunedin. A semi-rural residential suburb on the Pacific coast at the southwestern end of the Otago Peninsula, Ocean Grove is located 6.5 kilometres (4.0 mi) southeast of Dunedin city centre.

The suburb is isolated from much of the city by the bluff of Lawyers Head, which rises immediately to the west of the suburb and the Andersons Bay Cemetery, and as such has the feel of a separate community. The suburb lies close to the banks of the Tomahawk Lagoon, a twin-lobed lagoon noted for its bird life. The inner lobe is a wildlife reserve. Tomahawk Lagoon is separated from the sea at low tide by Tomahawk Beach, which runs east from the Lagoon's mouth for about 1 kilometre (0.62 mi). A smaller beach, Smaills Beach, lies further to the east, beyond which is the outcrop of Maori Head, 2 kilometres (1.2 mi) from the lagoon's mouth. A rocky reef and the small Bird island lie close to the headland.

The suburb was known as Tomahawk until the 1930s, The name "Tomahawk", documented in the Otago Witness from 1852, is unlikely to be a reference to the weapon. It is more likely an anglicized form of the Māori words toma haka, often interpreted as "dance by a gravesite". Toma means a place of bones, or shrine for bones; haka is here taken to mean the Māori dance of challenge, but may rather be the Southern Māori form of the word hanga, to build or create. The suburb became part of Dunedin City in 1968. The suburb has one main road, Tomahawk Road, which runs roughly parallel with the coast and links with the suburbs of Andersons Bay and Tainui in the west. In the east, it becomes the rural Centre Road, which climbs to the ridge at the centre of the Otago Peninsula before joining with Highcliff Road, the ridge road which runs between Shiel Hill and Portobello.

Ocean Grove's most notable structures are the remains of two World War II gun emplacements. These stand close to the Jack Fox Lookout, which is at the top of Tomahawk Bluff, the promontory which separates Tomahawk Beach from Smaills Beach. A notable two-storey house, Glen Cairn, the original Smaill family homestead, is located at Smaills Beach. It is now used as the headquarters of the Tautuku Fishing Club. Between Tomahawk Beach and Tomahawk Road is Tomahawk Domain and recreation ground, which serves as a sports ground and is home to Grants Braes football club.

== Demographics ==
Ocean Grove covers 0.64 km^{2} (0.25 sq mi), and is part of the larger Tainui statistical area.

Historical population
Year	Pop.	±% p.a.
2006	408	—
2013	456	+1.60%
2018	441	−0.67%

Ocean Grove had a population of 441 at the 2018 New Zealand census, a decrease of 15 people (−3.3%) since the 2013 census, and an increase of 33 people (8.1%) since the 2006 census. There were 177 households. There were 222 males and 219 females, giving a sex ratio of 1.01 males per female, with 87 people (19.7%) aged under 15 years, 72 (16.3%) aged 15 to 29, 246 (55.8%) aged 30 to 64, and 42 (9.5%) aged 65 or older.

Ethnicities were 92.5% European/Pākehā, 8.8% Māori, 2.7% Pacific peoples, 3.4% Asian, and 4.8% other ethnicities (totals add to more than 100% since people could identify with multiple ethnicities).

Although some people objected to giving their religion, 57.8% had no religion, 29.3% were Christian, 1.4% were Buddhist and 6.1% had other religions.

Of those at least 15 years old, 102 (28.8%) people had a bachelor or higher degree, and 48 (13.6%) people had no formal qualifications. The employment status of those at least 15 was that 189 (53.4%) people were employed full-time, 54 (15.3%) were part-time, and 18 (5.1%) were unemployed.
