= John Wilson Ocean Drive =

Scenic coastal drive and recreational route in Dunedin, New Zealand

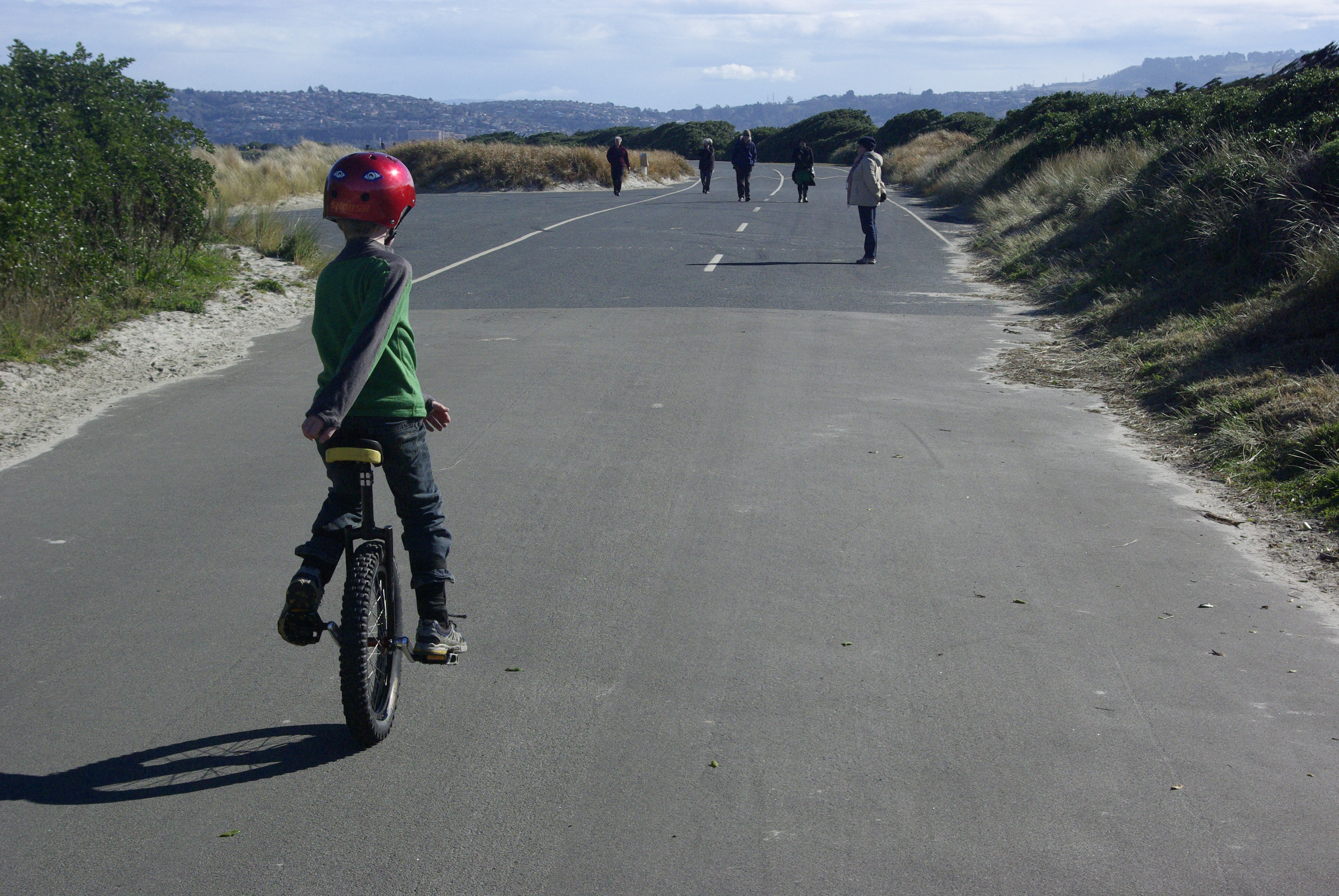

Route information
- Maintained by Dunedin City Council
- Length: 2 km (1.2 mi)
- Status: Recreational drive and pedestrian route
- Existed: 1970s–present
- Restrictions: Vehicle access limited to weekdays 11:00–15:00

John Wilson Ocean Drive, often referred to as John Wilson Drive is a scenic coastal drive and recreational route in Dunedin, New Zealand. It runs along the southern coastline from St Kilda toward Lawyers Head, overlooking the Pacific Ocean and adjacent beaches. The drive is primarily used for walking, cycling, and recreational activities, with limited vehicle access during specified weekday hours. It forms part of the Ocean Beach Domain and has been the subject of long-running public and political debate regarding vehicle access, safety, and public use.

== History ==
=== Origins and naming ===
John Wilson Ocean Drive was developed in the 1970s to improve public access to coastal views and the headland at Lawyers Head. The drive is named after John Wilson (1867–1953), a Dunedin businessman and civic leader who served as Mayor of Dunedin from 1912 to 1913 and was involved in local governance and domain management, including the Ocean Beach Domain Board.

=== Vehicle access and closures ===
The drive was closed to vehicles in 2006 to allow construction of the Tahuna wastewater outfall pipeline. Following the project's completion, vehicle access became the subject of repeated reviews and public debate.

In 2009, the drive was briefly reopened to vehicles after a council decision to allow use during daylight hours, with a new security fence planned. However, following a death at Lawyers Head on 24 September and concerns about public safety, the council closed the drive to vehicles again in October 2009. Mayor Peter Chin’s decision to close the drive was later retrospectively approved by councillors.

In 2011, the Dunedin City Council advanced proposals to permanently restrict vehicle access by amending the Ocean Beach Domain management plan. Draft changes removed references to the route as a legal road and emphasised its status as part of the domain, allowing vehicle use to be controlled to protect public safety, sensitive dune systems, flora and fauna, and recreational values. The proposals required public consultation under the Reserves Act 1977 and approval from the Minister of Conservation.

=== Public debate ===
Public opinion on vehicle access has been divided. In 2011, a petition signed by more than 1,000 people called for the drive to be reopened to vehicles, citing accessibility concerns for older residents and those with limited mobility. Proposals for shared use, including restricted vehicle hours or designated pedestrian-only periods, were discussed as part of the council’s review process.

== Current use ==
John Wilson Ocean Drive is open to pedestrians and cyclists at all times and is widely used for walking, running, and recreational activities. Under current Dunedin City Council regulations, the drive is open to vehicles between 11 am and 3 pm on weekdays. Outside these hours, as well as on weekends and public holidays, bollards restrict vehicle access and the drive becomes pedestrian-only. The area may also be booked for events and commercial activities with council approval.

== Location and features ==
The drive runs above St Clair and St Kilda beaches and terminates near Lawyers Head, a prominent coastal headland offering expansive views along the Otago coastline. The surrounding area includes coastal dunes, beach access points, and informal lookout areas popular with visitors and locals.
