= Smaills Beach =

Clothing-optional beach in Dunedin, New Zealand

- Beach
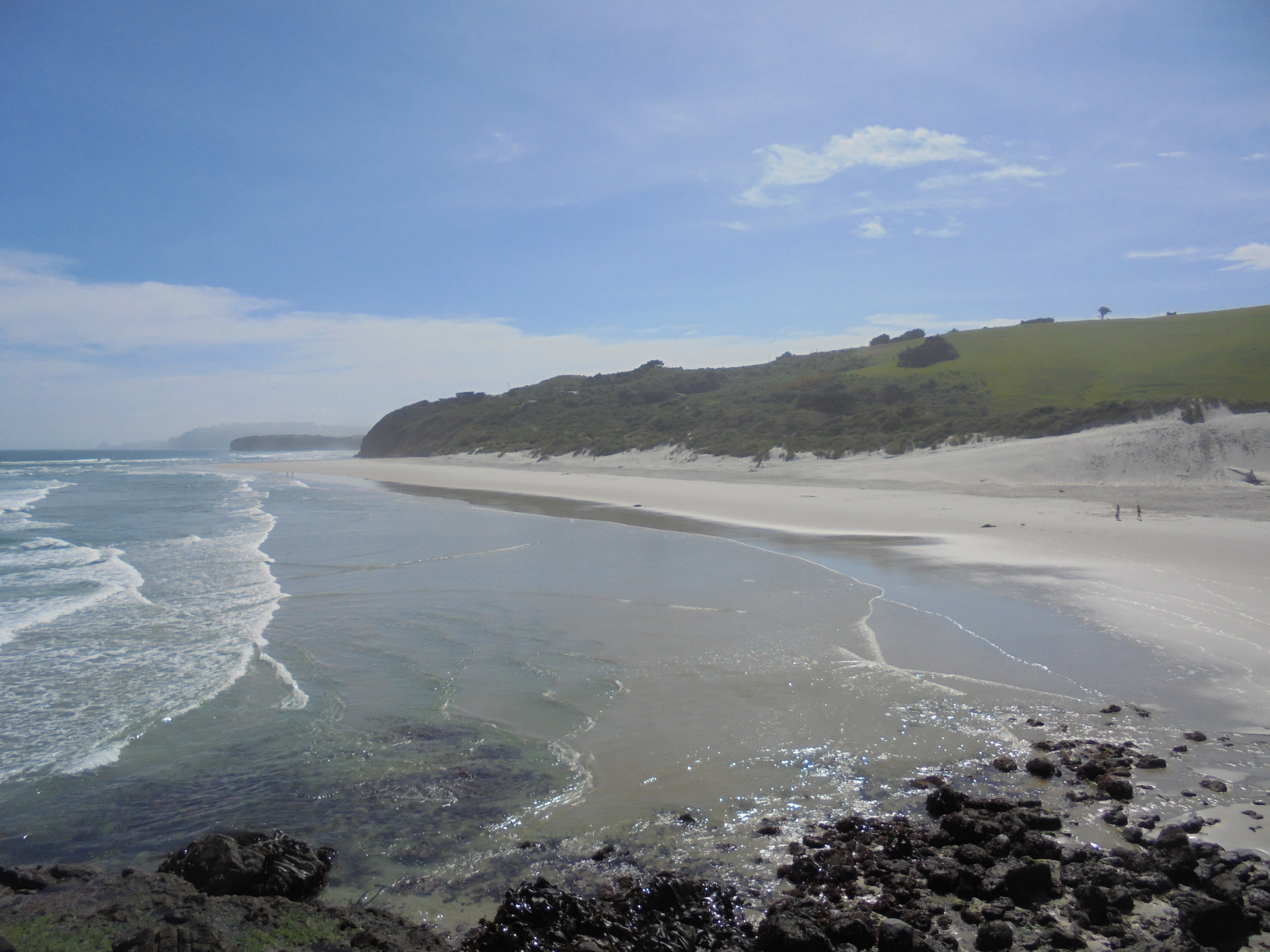
- Smaills Beach from an eastern vantage point
- Interactive map of Smaills Beach
- Coordinates: 45°54′26″S 170°33′40″E
- Location: Dunedin, New Zealand

Smaills Beach (often spelled "Smails Beach") is a beach on the Pacific Ocean 7.6 kilometres (4.7 mi) southeast of the city centre of Dunedin, New Zealand. Located within the Ocean Grove Reserve adjacent to Tomahawk Beach, at the point where Otago Peninsula joins the mainland of the South Island, Smaills Beach is a white sand beach for much of its length, but its western end is covered in volcanic boulders. Just offshore from the beach, dominating the wave patterns of the surf, is the rocky outcrop known as Bird Island. Smaills Beach is clothing-optional, renowned for its wildlife, and popular with surfers.

== Physical geography ==
Smaills Beach has a length of around 800 metres (2,600 ft) and faces almost directly south. Boulders are scattered along the westernmost part of the beach. To the west, it is separated from Tomahawk Beach by Tomahawk Bluff, a small promontory of black volcanic rock punctuated by sea caves, on the top of which stands the Jack Fox Lookout. At very low tides the base of the promontory is exposed, making Tomahawk and Smaills effectively a single beach. To the east the beach is bounded by Tomahawk Creek, hugging the base of the high cliffs of Māori Head, beyond which rise Pudney Cliff and Highcliff. Northward an assortment of scrub-covered dunes rises up to meet Tomahawk Road. Southward the incoming waves of the Pacific Ocean are deflected into complex patterns by Bird Island, so named for its popularity with seabirds. Rip currents are a known hazard.

Access to Smaills Beach is by a number of walking-tracks leading down through the dunes from the Tomahawk Road carparks, the chief one being alongside Tomahawk Creek.

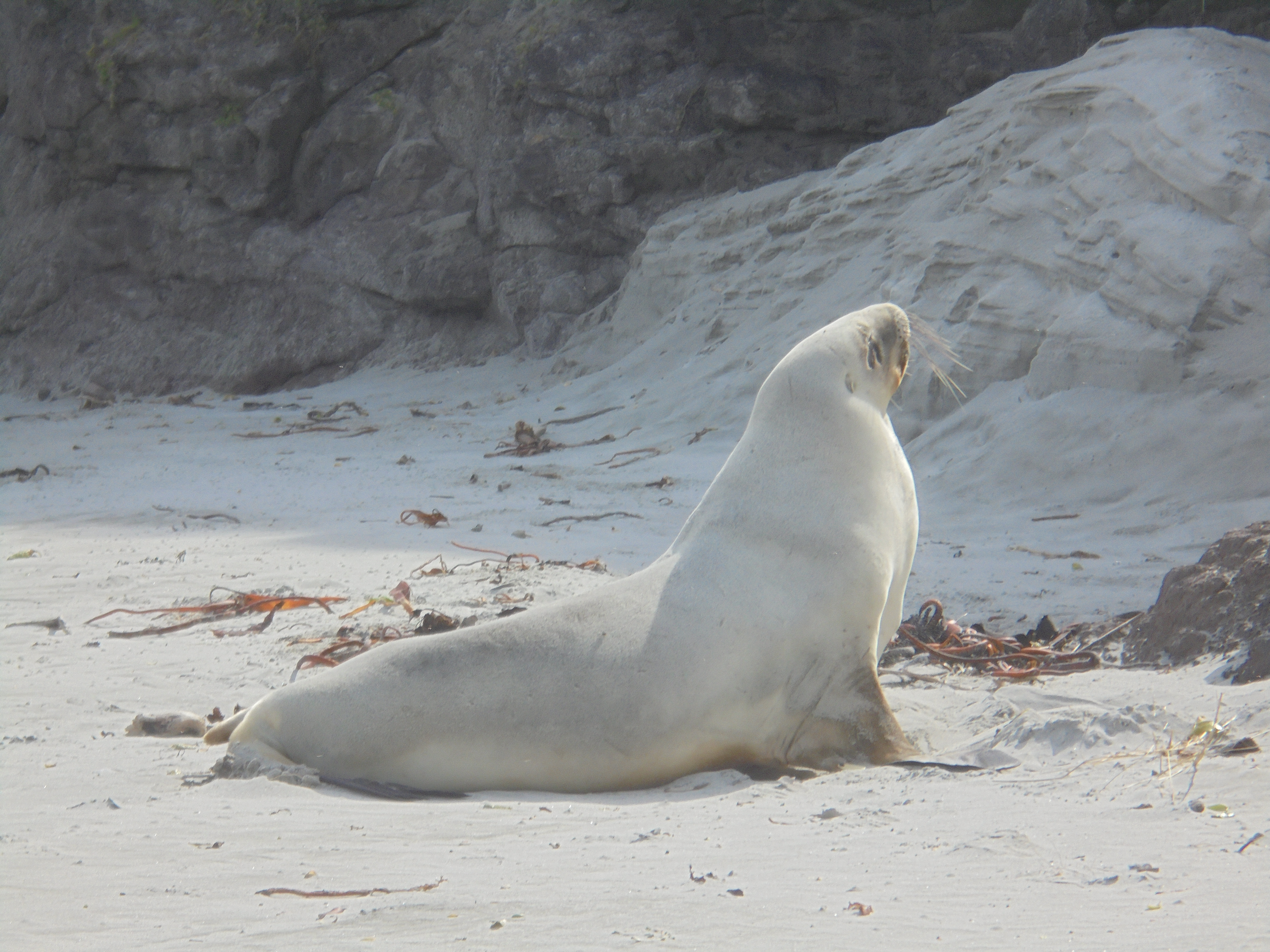
Female sea lion, Smaills Beach, October 2019

=== Wildlife ===
Smaills Beach is frequented by yellow-eyed penguins, little blue penguins, and New Zealand sea lions. Visitors are advised to take care and keep their distance, for the sake of these animals' safety and, in the case of the sea lions, their own. In particular, beachgoers are asked to keep dogs under control around sea lions as aggressive interactions could result in injuries on either side. Oystercatchers, red-billed gulls and black-backed gulls are often seen on the beach. Smaills' invertebrate community is similar to that of the surrounding coastal area, but with greater diversity of habitats.

=== Environmental concerns ===
Wind erosion of the sand dunes is a concern at Smaills Beach as for much of the adjacent coastline. The Dunedin City Council is addressing this concern by an ongoing programme of contouring and revegetation, through a memorandum of understanding with the Tomahawk Smaills Beachcare Trust.

== Social geography ==
=== History and name ===
Prior to European colonization, Smaills and Tomahawk Beaches formed part of a walking track for Māori travelling between Ōtākou and Tomahawk Lagoon. Smaills Beach is named for the Smaill family, who were central to the local farming community in the 1870s and 1880s. Their original homestead still stands near the beach and is listed as a Historic Place Category 2 by Heritage New Zealand. It is presently in use as the clubhouse of the Tautuku Fishing Club. In 1897 the local area including both Smaills and Tomahawk Beaches was classified as a government reserve, and in 1931 it was formally established as the Ocean Grove Reserve.

=== Current use ===
Smaills Beach is regarded as a good surfing beach and hence is popular with surfers, but due to the rip currents is a recurring source of rescue callouts. It is not patrolled by lifeguards, and the public are urged not to surf or swim alone.

Smaills Beach is the site of the Tomahawk Smaills Beachcare Trust's plant nursery, which the Trust estimates produces 4000 plants each year for the purpose of revegetating and stabilizing the dune system throughout the Reserve.

The Tomahawk Road carparks above the beach are frequented by freedom campers. Tension has arisen between these campers and local residents, who want their presence banned. The reason given by residents is that the campers habitually defecate in the Reserve; however, the solution of providing public toilets at the site has been rejected in favour of the proposed ban.

Smaills Beach is periodically used by naturists for nude bathing. New Zealand has no official nude beaches, as public nudity is legal on any beach where it is "known to occur". This has not prevented some beach users from calling the police on visiting naturists.
