= Chisholm Park Golf Links =

Golf course in Dunedin, New Zealand

Dunedin Golf Club (Chisholm Links)
- Interactive map of Dunedin Golf Club (Chisholm Links)
- 45°54′20″S 170°31′40″E

Club information
- Location: Dunedin, New Zealand
- Established: 1933
- Type: Public
- Tota holes: 18
- Website: http://www.dunedingolfclub.co.nz/

Chisholm Links
- Par: 71
- Length: 5700m

Dunedin Golf Club (Chisholm Links) is a golf club and links course in the New Zealand city of Dunedin. It is located in the southern coastal suburb of Tahuna, close to Andersons Bay Cemetery and the coastal headland of Lawyers Head.

The course was created as part of a public works project during the Great Depression of the 1930s, and was officially opened in 1933 as Ocean Beach Links. It was named after former Dunedin mayor Robert Chisholm.

The links hosted the New Zealand Amateur Championship in 2003 and Australasian PGA Tour events in 2001, 2002, and 2004. The course is rated highly; it is ranked among the country's top 20 courses, and leading New Zealand golfer Greg Turner has described it as "the second best links course in New Zealand".

The course has a par of 71, and measures some 5,700 metres (6,200 yd), with undulating terrain and the challenges of weather associated with links courses. Holes 8 to 14 are regarded as among the best in Otago, with impressive views across both the Pacific and the city's southern suburbs, and hole 9 ("Lawyer’s Head") is considered by many as the country's best golf hole. With both tee and cup on ocean promontories, a straight line between the two crosses open water.

The club has some 500 members, and is served by a pro shop and clubhouse.

The course is naturally sand drained, allowing it to remain open year-round.

== See also ==
- List of links golf courses
