= Harold Robinson (dancer) =

New Zealand ballet dancer and choreographer

- Robinson in 1983
- Born: Harold George Robinson; 9 January 1919; Dunedin, New Zealand
- Died: 9 March 2012 (aged 93); Auckland, New Zealand
- Occupations: Ballet dancer; choreographer
- Spouse: Freda Stark (m. 1947; div. 1973)

Harold George Robinson (9 January 1919 – March 2012) was a New Zealand soldier in the World War II, a wartime female impersonator, and later a ballet dancer and a choreographer. He was the first New Zealander to perform with the Sadler's Wells Ballet (Royal Ballet) on a scholarship.

== Early life and family ==
Robinson was born in Dunedin on 9 January 1919, the son of Ethel and Harry Robinson. He attended St Clair School, before studying at King Edward Technical College.

As a child, Robinson involved himself in performing arts through singing, poetry, ballet, and theatre, competing in the Competitions Society events. He was invited to tour Australia with the Westminster Glee Singers at the age of 10. He was also a member of several performing arts clubs in his youth, including the Otago Repertory Company and the Dunedin Shakespeare Club.

Robinson had a brother, Stephen, and both served during World War II. Stephen was a Sergeant Pilot in the Royal New Zealand Air Force attached to the Royal Air Force, No. 15 Advanced Flying Unit and was killed in an air accident on 24 March 1942. He is buried in Swanton Morley (All Saints) Churchyard in Norfolk in England.

== War service ==
In 1941, Robinson enlisted in the New Zealand Army and served for the remaining four years of World War II. He was initially posted to the Pacific, where he served in the 36 Infantry Battalion. During this time, he served as batman to Major Jack Marshall, who went on to become New Zealand's 28th Prime Minister. Robinson was posted to Fiji, Norfolk Island, New Caledonia, Guadacanal and then the Treasury Islands. He was present for the opposed landing at Mono Island, which was the first of its kind to be carried out by New Zealand troops since the landing at Gallipoli. Robinson was later posted with Reinforcements to Egypt in 1945, where he was a pay clerk in the New Zealand Army Pay Corps.

During his military service, Robinson would often entertain troops through performing arts, and was a part of the Tui Concert Party during his service in the Pacific. Robinson performed using dresses he made from donated and scrap fabrics. He was also known often to perform in drag as Carmen Miranda and Minnie From Trinidad. As a homosexual man, Robinson became very friendly with other queer men, including the two female impersonators in the Kiwi Concert Party in the Pacific, Ralph Dyer and Douglas Morison. It was Dyer who gave Robinson his 'camp' name "Helena", after Helena Rubinstein. Robinson's experience in the World War II has been used to illustrate that there appeared to be a general tolerance of some degree of queer activity with the New Zealand military forces, as long as people were discrete. Military service provided a safety net for some men to explore their sexuality.

== Career ==
Upon his return to New Zealand, Robinson applied for a soldier's bursary to study ballet. He was accepted into Sadler's Wells Ballet school at age 26 and moved to London for his studies. Robinson was the first New Zealander to be accepted to this school on a scholarship and was also amongst the first returned service people to receive a bursary. His bursary application was supported by Major Jack Marshall, under whom he served during his military service.

In London, Robinson flatted with Dyer and Morison, the two other homosexual female impersonators in the Pacific concert parties. Their friendship is illustrated as an example of 'queer mateship' in the 2020 history book, Crossing the Lines: the story of three homosexual soldiers in WWII, by Brent Coutts.

After completing his studies, Robinson performed with the Vienna State Ballet at Covent Garden, and later went on to join the International Ballet in 1948. In 1952, he joined the well-known Windmill Theatre in London.

Robinson returned to New Zealand in 1953 and established a clothing store, The Bridal Boutique, in Auckland's Queen Street. He also became a dance instructor during his time living in Auckland, and choreographed the ballet The Seven Deadly Sins in 1971.

== Personal life ==
Robinson identified as homosexual. He was noted to have disliked more contemporary labels for this sexuality such as 'gay' or 'queer'. Coutts notes that such terms were uncommon for much of his life. He was known to have had several relationships.

Robinson's first relationship was with Rowland Watson, whom he met through theatre, prior to his military service. During World War II, he entered a relationship with fellow soldier Bob Murphy, and remained in this relationship for a period of time after completing his military service. In 1941, Robinson met Freda Stark, another prominent New Zealand-born dancer. The pair married in London in 1947. The couple separated after several years of marriage, and eventually divorced in 1973. It is well documented that Robinson was gay and Stark was a lesbian. They remained close friends until Stark's death in 1999.

Robinson resided in Auckland during his later life, and was a prominent figure within the LGBTQ community within the city.

Robinson died on 9 March 2012, aged 93, and a service was held for him in Papatoetoe, Auckland. His ashes are buried in Andersons Bay Cemetery, Dunedin.
