= Tainui, New Zealand =

Tainui
- Suburb
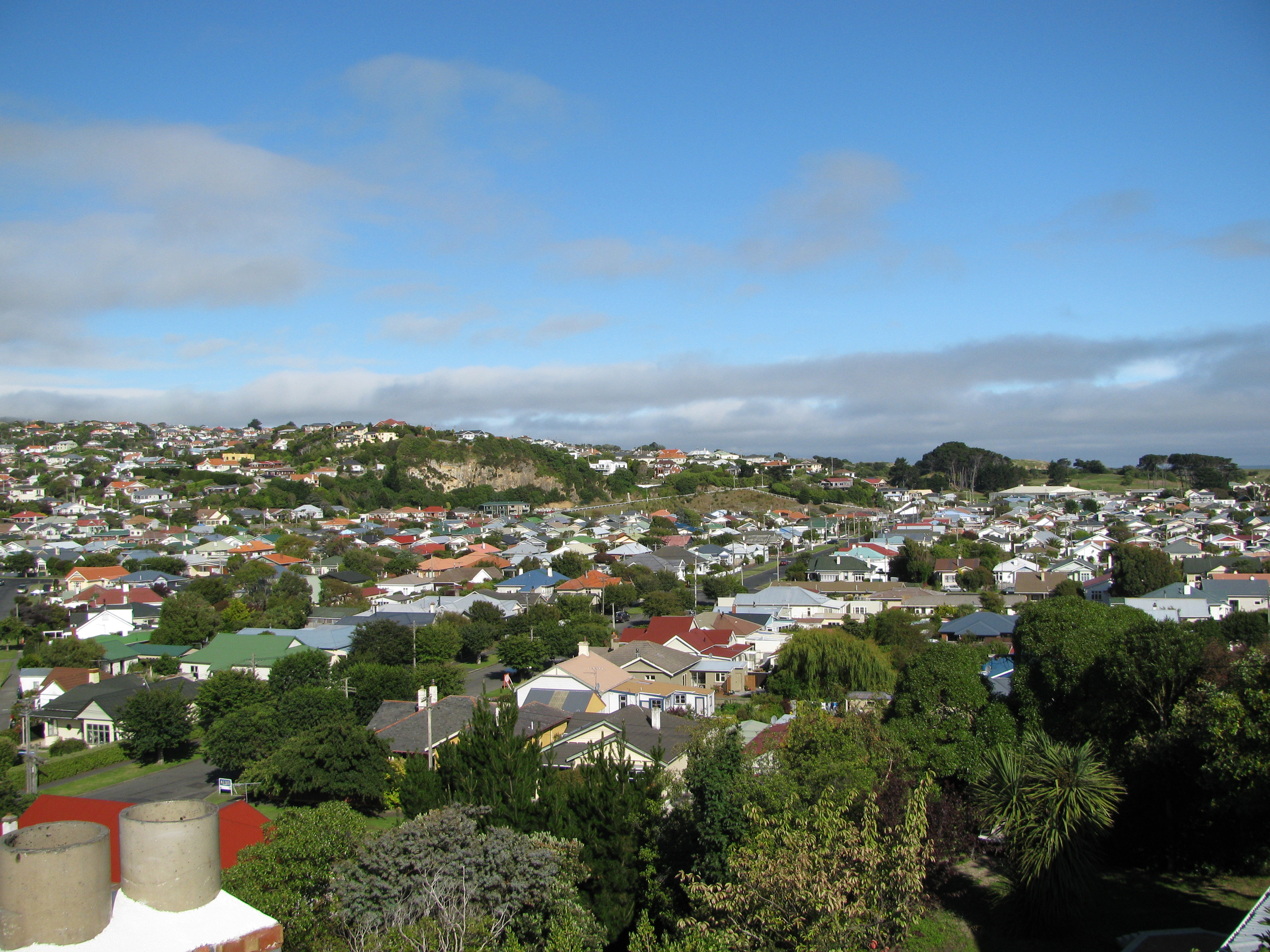
- A view over Tainui, looking south east
- Interactive map of Tainui
- Coordinates: 45.902°S 170.523°E
- Country: New Zealand
- City: Dunedin
- Local authority: Dunedin City Council

Area
  - Land: 199 ha (490 acres)

Population (June 2025)
  - Total: 2,100
  - Density: 1,100/km^{2} (2,700/sq mi)

Musselburgh	Andersons Bay
St Kilda	Tainui	Ocean Grove
	(Pacific Ocean)

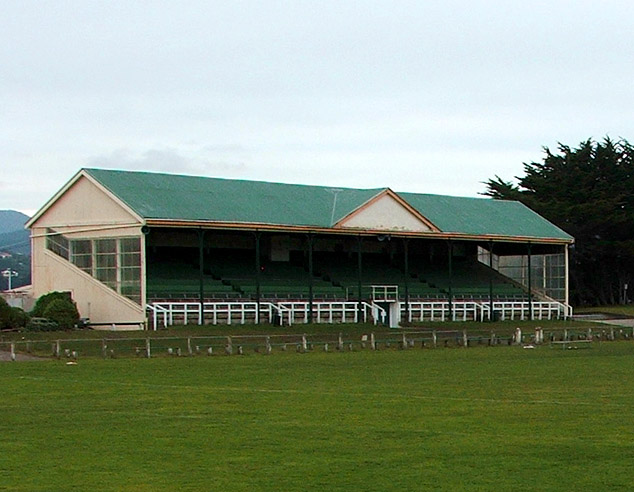
The grandstand at Tahuna Park

Tahuna and Tainui are two small, somewhat vaguely defined suburbs of the New Zealand city of Dunedin. They lie to the south of Andersons Bay and Musselburgh, close to Dunedin's southern coastline (Ocean Beach). Both are often considered parts of either Musselburgh or Andersons Bay.

Tainui lies to the north, in the area of residential housing which lies in the southeastern corner of "The Flat" (southern Dunedin's wide coastal plain) between Victoria and Tahuna Roads in the south and Musselburgh Rise in the north. Its eastern boundary is the start of a section of the Musselburgh Rise skirted by Tainui Road. Notable features of Tainui include Culling Park, a sports ground which is the home of Dunedin Technical football club.

To the south of Tainui is Tahuna. This suburb stretches along Victoria and Tahuna Roads, and is largely dominated by several areas of open space which lie to the south between these roads and the ocean. These open spaces include two notable sports venues: Chisholm Park Golf Course and Tahuna Park.

Chisholm Park is a championship-standard links course featuring one of New Zealand's finest holes, Lawyers Head. This hole dog-legs around craggy cliffs with the ocean pounding at their feet, and as such is both visually impressive and technically difficult. The course was founded in 1937 and extended from nine to 18 holes in 1941.

Tahuna Park houses Dunedin's A&P showgrounds, and was the city's first rugby union and rugby league test venue. The grounds were inaugurated in a 20-acre (8.1 ha) here in 1883, and the park's only union test match was played in 1905, with the All Blacks beating Australia 14–3. The park hosted the 1924 Great Britain side when they defeated the New Zealand rugby league side 31–18 in front of 16,000 fans.

The third notable open space close to the coast is the Andersons Bay Cemetery, Dunedin's biggest cemetery. This is located at the southeastern end of Tahuna, and is bounded to the west and south by Chisholm Park Golf Links. The cemetery occupies a prominent rise that juts into the sea as Lawyers Head. The cemetery was opened in 1867, but is now largely full. A crematorium, inaugurated in 1962, occupies a prominent spot close to the cliffs.

Beyond the cemetery, Tahuna Road reaches a Y-junction with Tomahawk Road, which descends to the southeast to follow the coast to the suburb of Ocean Grove and rises to the north to meet with Silverton Road, Andersons Bay at that suburb's boundary with Shiel Hill. This area of Tahuna was formerly known as Ocean View, a name which is still occasionally encountered, though this name has fallen out of use due to confusion with the settlement of the same name which lies 15 kilometres (9.3 mi) to the southwest near Brighton.

== Demographics ==
The Tainui statistical area, which includes Tahuna and Ocean Grove, covers 1.99 km^{2} (0.77 sq mi) and had an estimated population of 2,100 as of June 2025, with a population density of 1,055 people per km^{2}.

Historical population
Year	Pop.	±% p.a.
2006	1,917	—
2013	1,983	+0.48%
2018	1,980	−0.03%

Tainui had a population of 1,980 at the 2018 New Zealand census, a decrease of 3 people (−0.2%) since the 2013 census, and an increase of 63 people (3.3%) since the 2006 census. There were 750 households, comprising 942 males and 1,038 females, giving a sex ratio of 0.91 males per female. The median age was 37.1 years (compared with 37.4 years nationally), with 381 people (19.2%) aged under 15 years, 387 (19.5%) aged 15 to 29, 1,020 (51.5%) aged 30 to 64, and 192 (9.7%) aged 65 or older.

Ethnicities were 91.2% European/Pākehā, 8.8% Māori, 3.5% Pasifika, 4.1% Asian, and 2.6% other ethnicities. People may identify with more than one ethnicity.

The percentage of people born overseas was 17.0, compared with 27.1% nationally.

Although some people chose not to answer the census's question about religious affiliation, 58.3% had no religion, 31.1% were Christian, 0.5% had Māori religious beliefs, 0.3% were Hindu, 0.2% were Muslim, 0.5% were Buddhist and 2.7% had other religions.

Of those at least 15 years old, 477 (29.8%) people had a bachelor's or higher degree, and 198 (12.4%) people had no formal qualifications. The median income was $35,700, compared with $31,800 nationally. 252 people (15.8%) earned over $70,000 compared to 17.2% nationally. The employment status of those at least 15 was that 876 (54.8%) people were employed full-time, 273 (17.1%) were part-time, and 60 (3.8%) were unemployed.

== Education ==
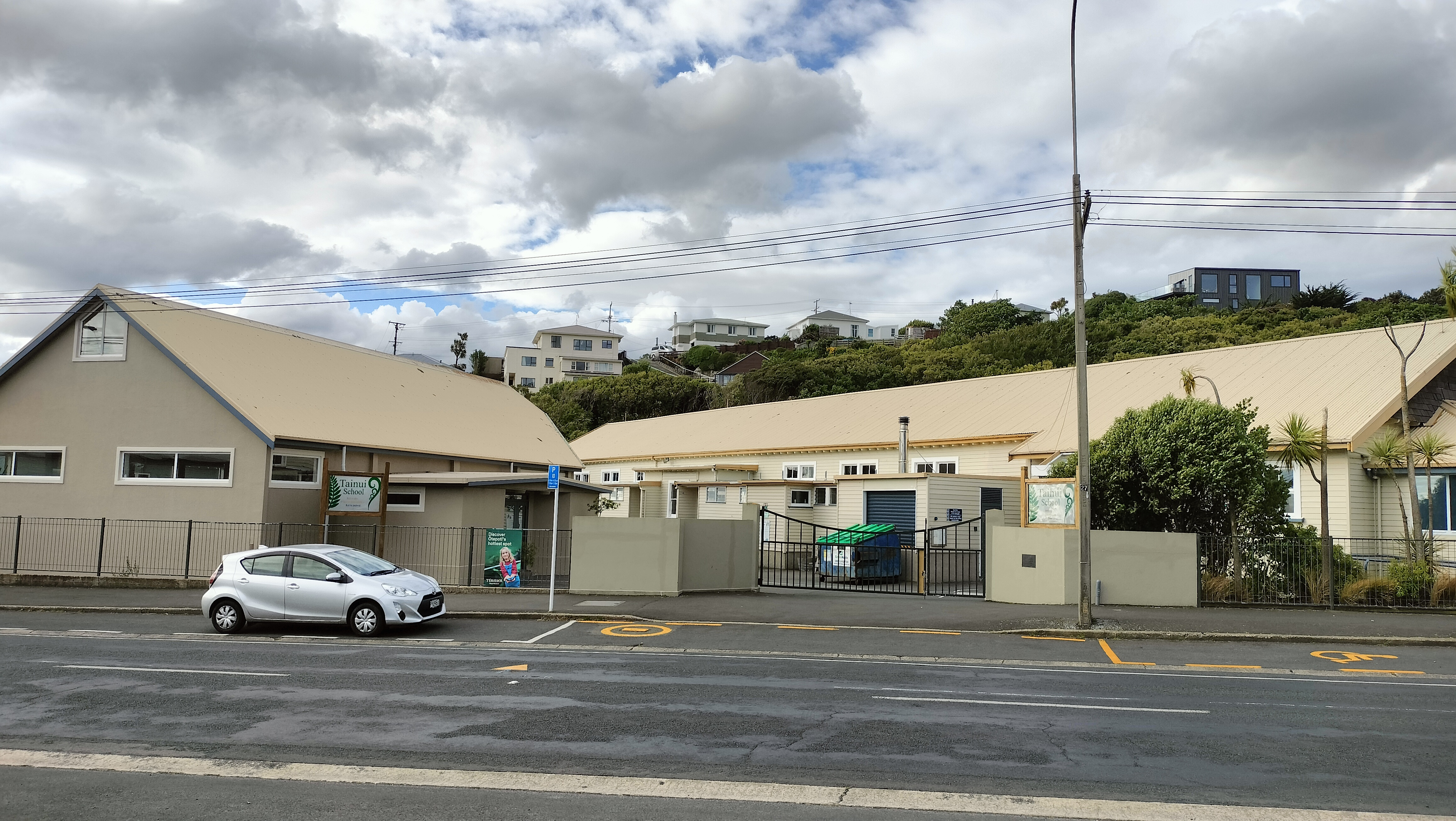
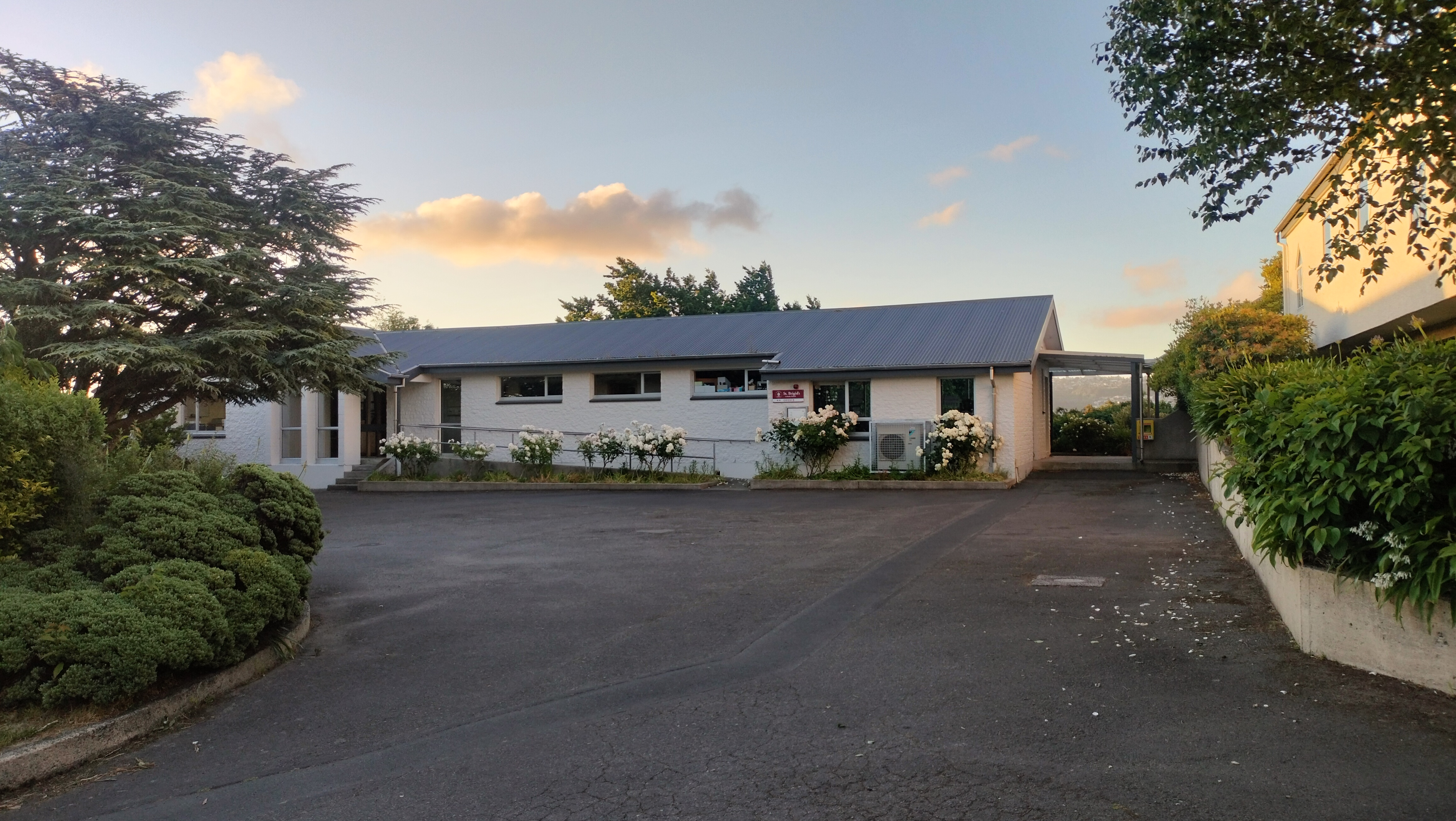
Tainui School and St Brigid's School.

Tainui School is a state contributing primary school serving years 1 to 6 with a roll of 249 students as of March 2026. The school was established in 1929.

St Brigid's School is a state-integrated Catholic primary school. It caters for year 1 to 6 students and has a roll of 68 as of March 2026. It first opened in 1939.
