= Andersons Bay Cemetery =

Cemetery in Dunedin, New Zealand

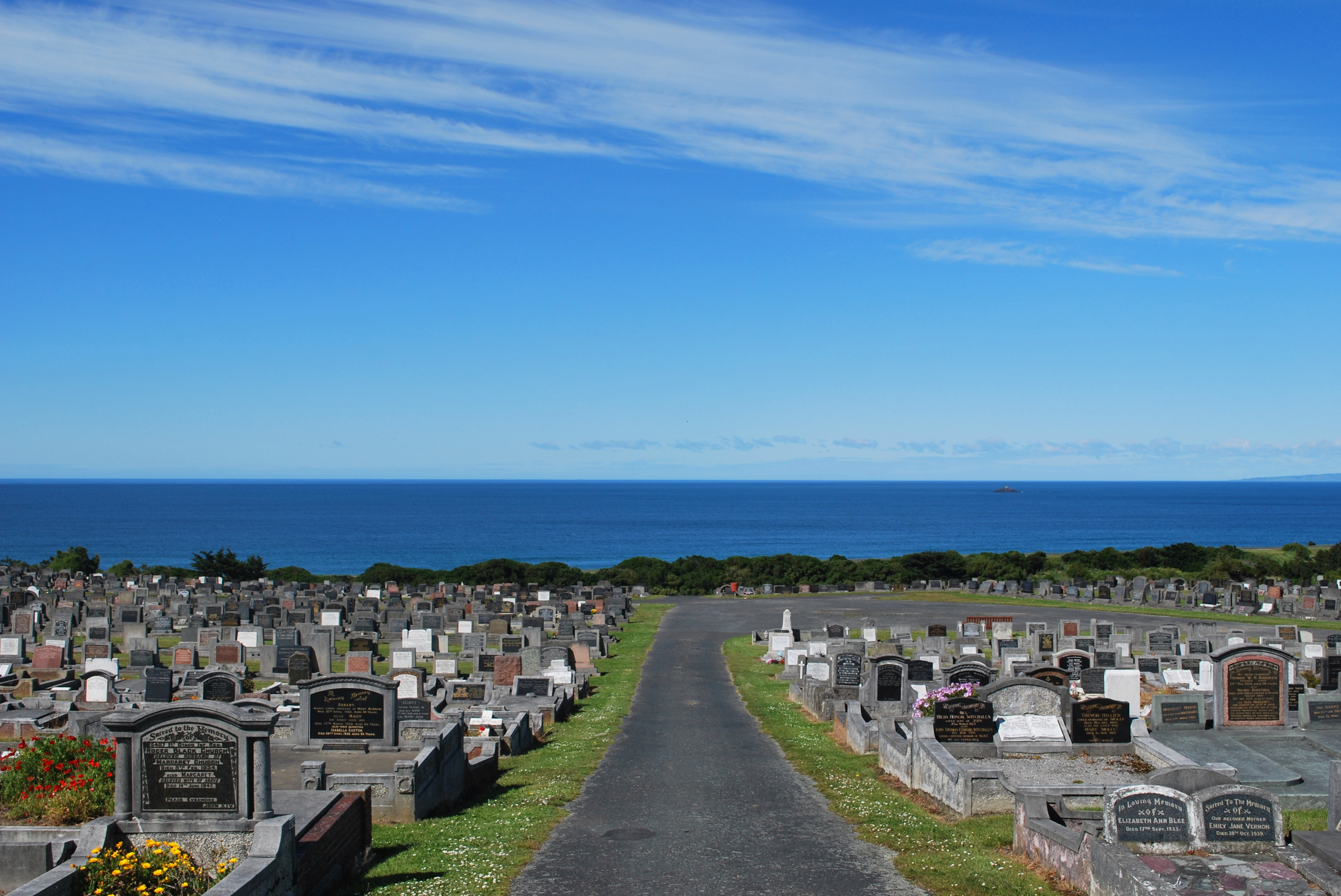
- View of Anderson's Bay Cemetery
- Interactive map of Andersons Bay Cemetery

Details
- Established: 1867
- Location: Dunedin
- Country: New Zealand
- Coordinates: 45.9044°S 170.5343°E
- Find a Grave: Andersons Bay Cemetery

Andersons Bay Cemetery is a major cemetery in the New Zealand city of Dunedin. It is located 4 kilometres (2.5 mi) to the southeast of the city centre, on a rocky outcrop which forms the inland part of Lawyers Head, a promontory which juts into the Pacific Ocean. The cemetery is bounded on the western and southern sides by Chisholm Park Golf Links, and to the east by steep slopes which descend to the Tomahawk Lagoon. Despite its name, the cemetery is located in the suburb of Tahuna, which lies immediately to the south of the suburb of Andersons Bay, and almost 1 kilometre (0.62 mi) from the former (now largely reclaimed) bay itself, at the head of the Otago Harbour.

The cemetery is the largest in Dunedin, and as such one of the largest in the South Island. In existence by 1867, the cemetery was the city's main burial site from the early twentieth century until the 1980s, and also contains several older sets of remains which were re-interred here from other sites. Since the 1980s, the role of Dunedin's main cemetery has been split between several sites, with the Green Park Cemetery at Waldronville taking the majority of new burials.

The crematorium, opened in 1927, is still in use. The Commonwealth War Graves Commission (CWGC) commemorates 2 World War II New Zealand servicemen cremated here.

The cemetery originally went by the imposing name of the Eastern Necropolis, but this quickly fell out of favour to be replaced with its current, more prosaic, name.

Andersons Bay Cemetery is noted for its large military memorial section, with many ex-servicemen having been buried here. Notable among them are Victoria Cross recipients Duncan Gordon Boyes and Horace Robert Martineau. The latter is one of 64 World War I Commonwealth service personnel buried here whose graves are registered and maintained by the CWGC, who are also responsible for 54 war graves from World War II.

The cemetery is also notable for its section of restored gravestones of early Dunedin Chinese settlers. Other prominent people buried in the cemetery include architects Edmund Anscombe and Francis Petre.

== Burials ==
- Edmund Anscombe (1874–1948), architect
- Duncan Gordon Boyes (1846–1869), recipient of the Victoria Cross
- Ella Campbell (1910–2003), botanist
- James Douglas (1872–1957), plumber and mayor of Dunedin (1921–1923)
- Bill Fraser (1924–2001), politician
- Jessie Hiett (1874–1962), temperance activist
- Horace Martineau (1874–1916), recipient of the Victoria Cross
- Jim Munro (1870–1945), politician
- Francis Petre (1847–1918), architect
- Harold Robinson (1919–2012), ballet dancer and choreographer
- John Shacklock (1865–1935), iron founder and mayor of Dunedin (1914–1915)

== Gallery ==
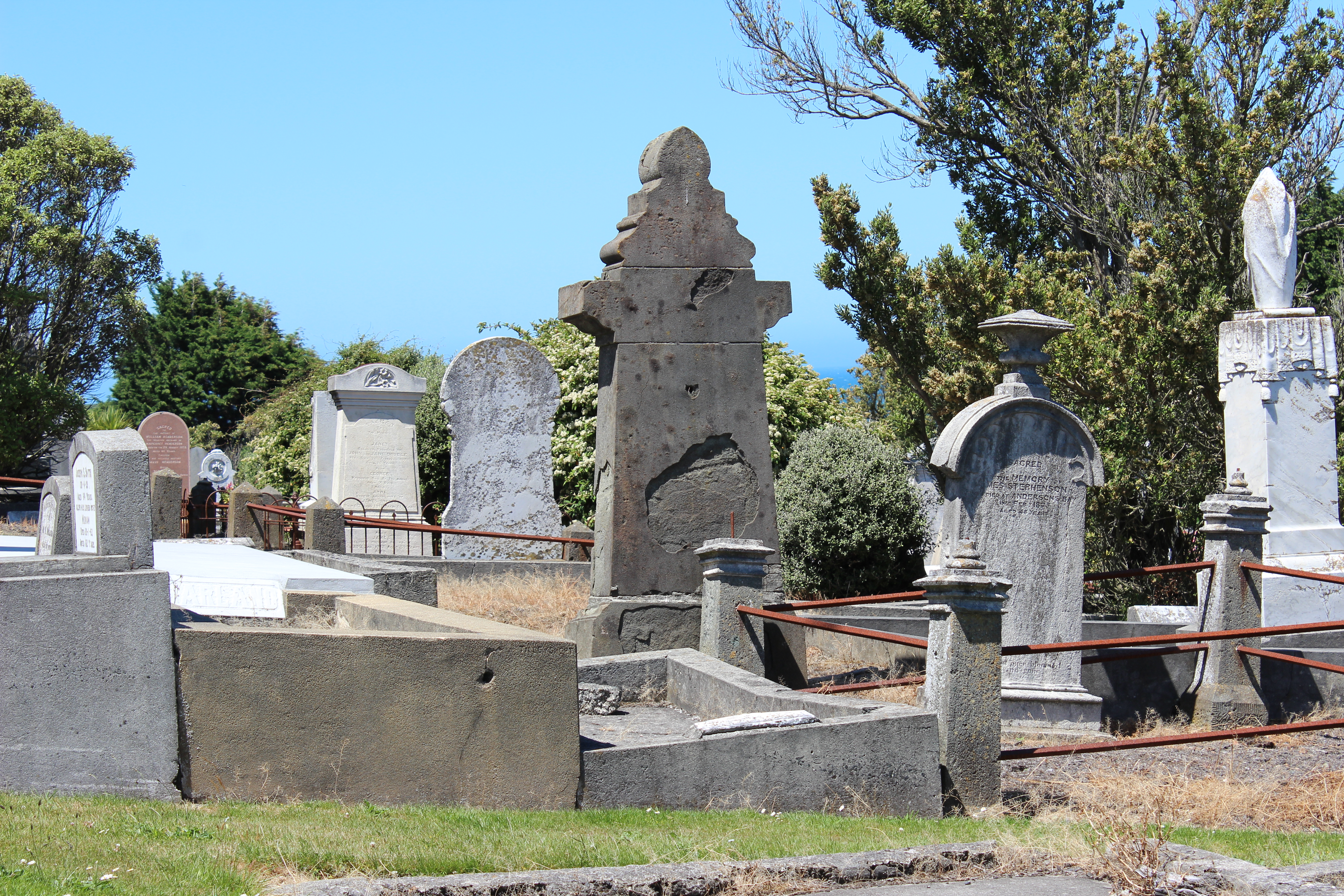
One of the oldest parts of Anderson's Bay Cemetery, Dunedin, New Zealand, showing headstones dating from the 1870s

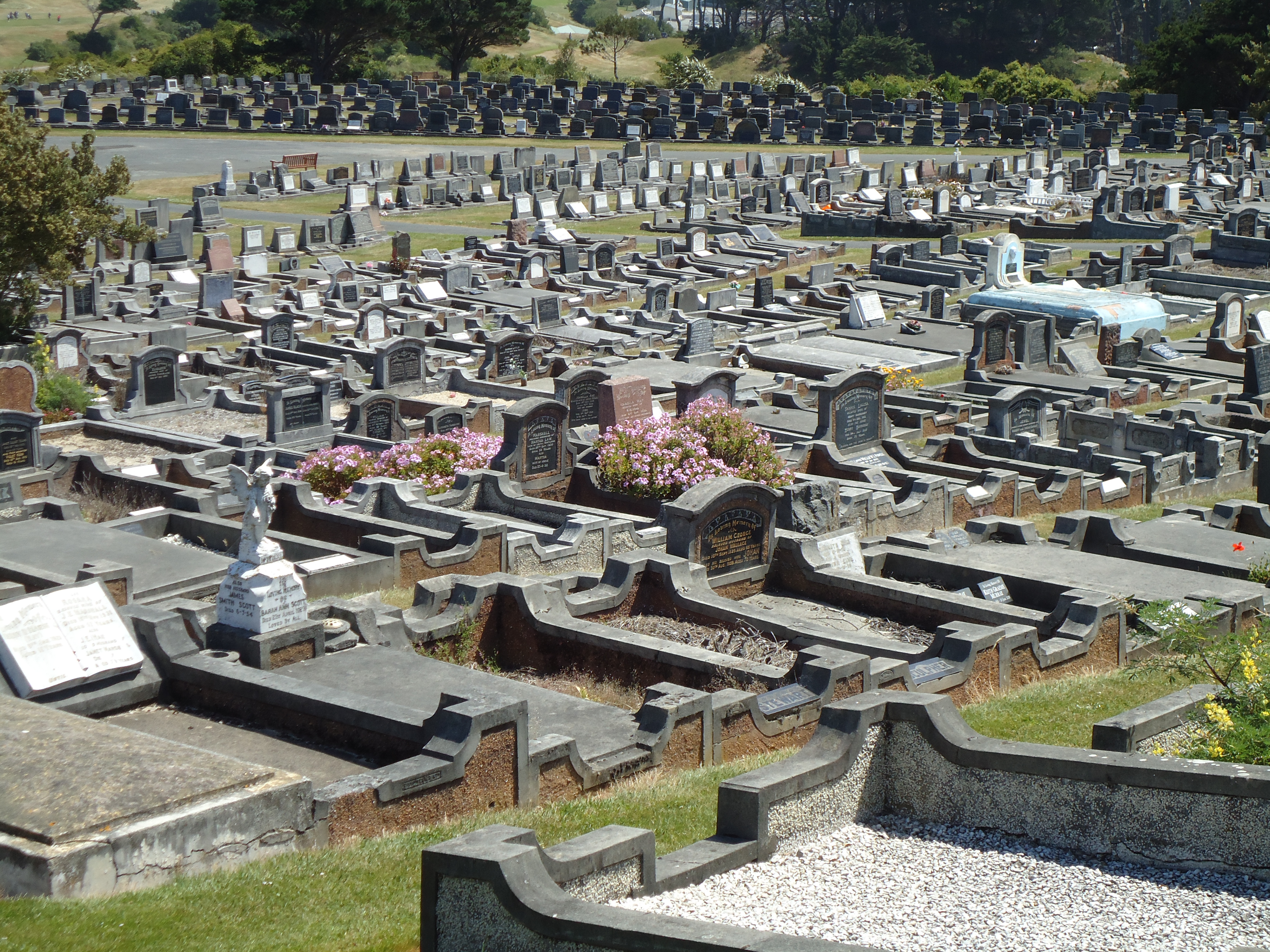
View of Anderson's Bay Cemetery

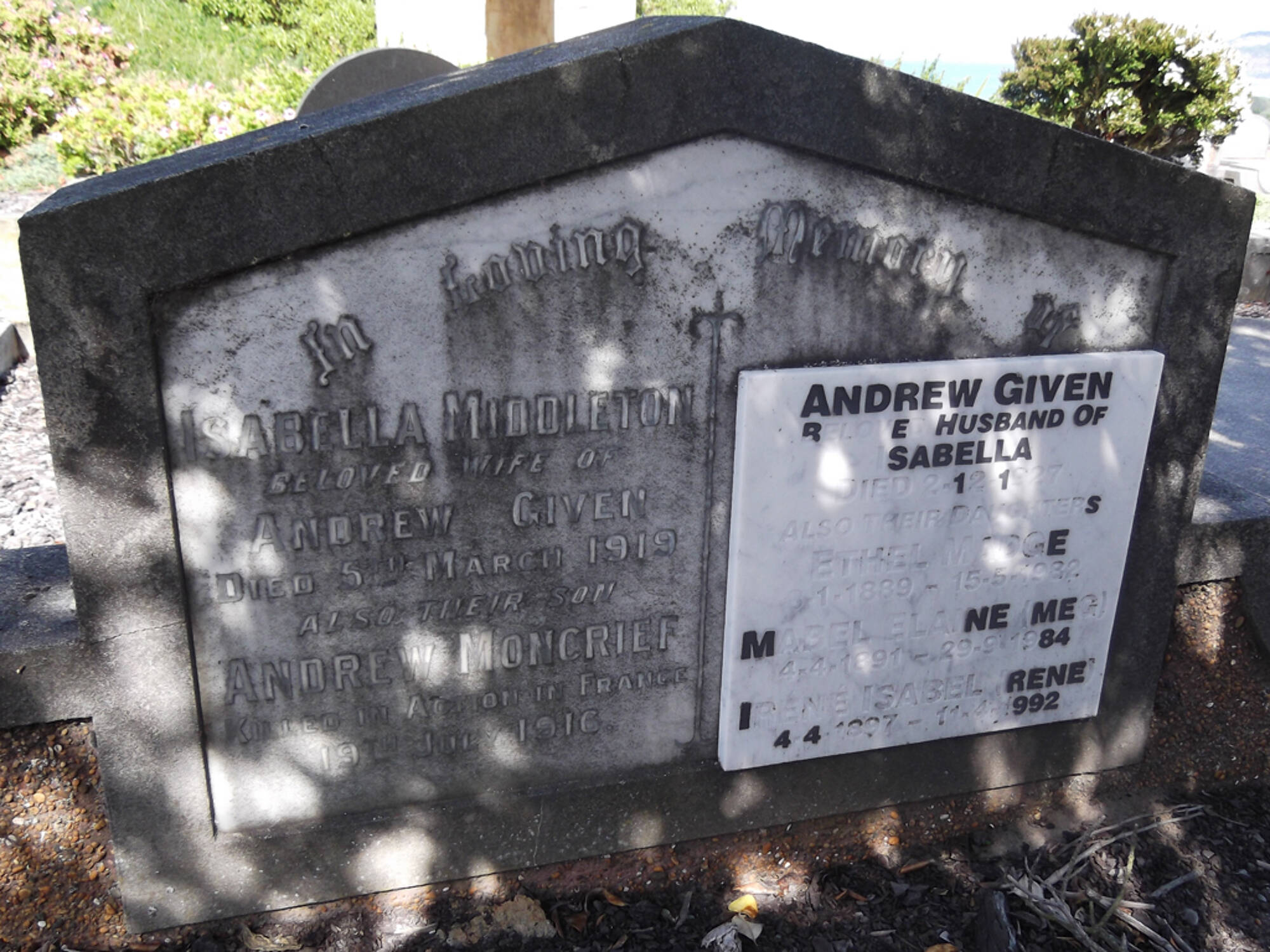
Headstone of New Zealand cricketer Andrew Given
