= Freda Stark =

New Zealand dancer

- Stark ca. 1936
- Born: 27 March 1910; Kaeo, New Zealand
- Died: 19 March 1999 (aged 88); Massey, Auckland
- Occupation: Dancer

Freda Beatrice Stark (27 March 1910 – 19 March 1999) was a New Zealand dancer. In 1935, she was a prosecution witness at two trials where Eric Mareo was convicted of the murder of his wife Thelma Mareo who was also Stark's lover. During the Second World War, she was a famed exotic dancer at Auckland's Wintergarden cabaret and nightclub, and a favourite of American troops stationed there, where she earned the title "Fever of the Fleet."

== Early life ==
Born in Kaeo in 1910, Stark was the daughter of James Stark, a shopkeeper, and Isabella Bramley. She attended St Benedict's School and Epsom Girls Grammar School after her parents shifted to Auckland shortly after her birth. Her father encouraged her to learn dance, and she began to do so at nine years of age.

After leaving school, Stark worked as a clerical worker by day, and danced as "L'Etoile" during the evenings, and her repertoire included tap, high kicks, tumbles and hula. During the 1930s, she also learned classical ballet, as steps toward an advanced examination certificate at New Zealand's Academy of Dance, which she acquired in the late thirties.

== Mareo murder trials ==
In 1933, Stark joined Ernest Rolls' revue, and met a young dancer named Thelma Trott, and the two women fell in love. In 1934, Stark was in the chorus of the Duchess of Danitz, while Trott starred. At this time, Trott married Eric Mareo, their conductor. The relationship was cut short in 1935 when Trott took a fatal overdose of the prescription drug Veronal in unexplained circumstances, leading to Mareo being charged with her murder.

Mareo was tried twice for the murder of Trott, was twice found guilty, and was twice sentenced to death by hanging (later commuted to 12 years in prison).

Stark was a prosecution witness at both trials and had to endure being outed as a lesbian, and constant subsequent accusations that she had given either mistaken or selective testimony while under oath which were never proven either way. Nude photographs of Stark were reproduced during the trial, but Stark remained unperturbed, and was later described as a model Crown witness.

== "Fever of the Fleet" ==
During the Second World War, Stark was a clerical worker at the Colonial Ammunition Company during the day. At night, she entertained New Zealand and American troops at the Wintergarden cabaret and nightclub. At times, she was clad only in a feather headdress, a G-string and gold bodypaint. The appreciative American Expeditionary troops bestowed the title "Fever of the Fleet" on Stark, and often booked out the Wintergarden specifically to attend her performances, hiring an accompanying band and floorshow at the same time.

== Postwar career ==
After the Second World War, Stark relocated to London, where she met and married Harold Robinson, a New Zealand-born dancer (and a gay man) at Sadler's Wells. The duo starred together in New Zealand-born Robert Steele's art film, Curves and Contrasts (1947), before their marriage ended by mutual consent. They did not divorce until 1973 and remained close friends. Although based in the United Kingdom, Stark frequently revisited New Zealand, before she returned permanently in 1970, and became a secretary at the University of Auckland.

During the 1990s there was renewed interest in her days as a dancer, and her life was celebrated in a biography Freda Stark: Her Extraordinary Life and in Peter Wells and Stewart Mains' documentary, The Mighty Civic (1989). Stark died in the Abbey Heights Rest Home in Massey, Auckland, in March 1999. She is buried alongside Thelma Mareo (1906 – 15 April 1935) at Waikumete Cemetery, Glen Eden, Auckland, New Zealand.

== Filmography ==
- Peter Wells and Stewart Main (directors) The Mighty Civic: Wellington: New Zealand Film Commission: 1989: Video, VHS format, 62 mins.
