= Tomahawk Lagoon =

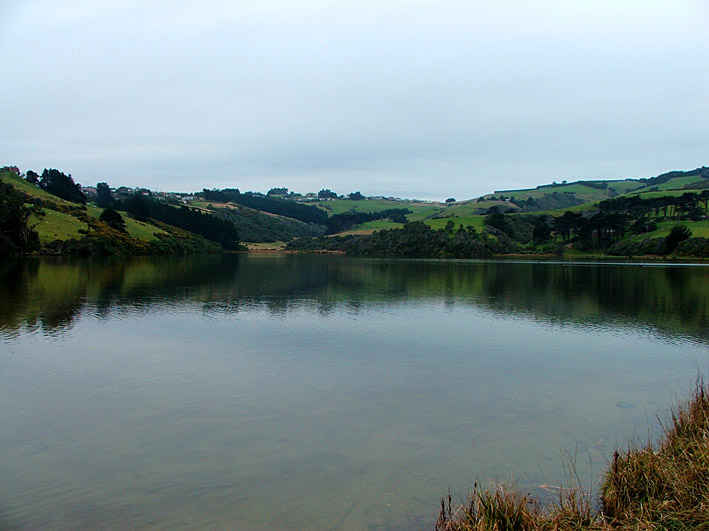
- The bottom lagoon, seen from Ocean Grove

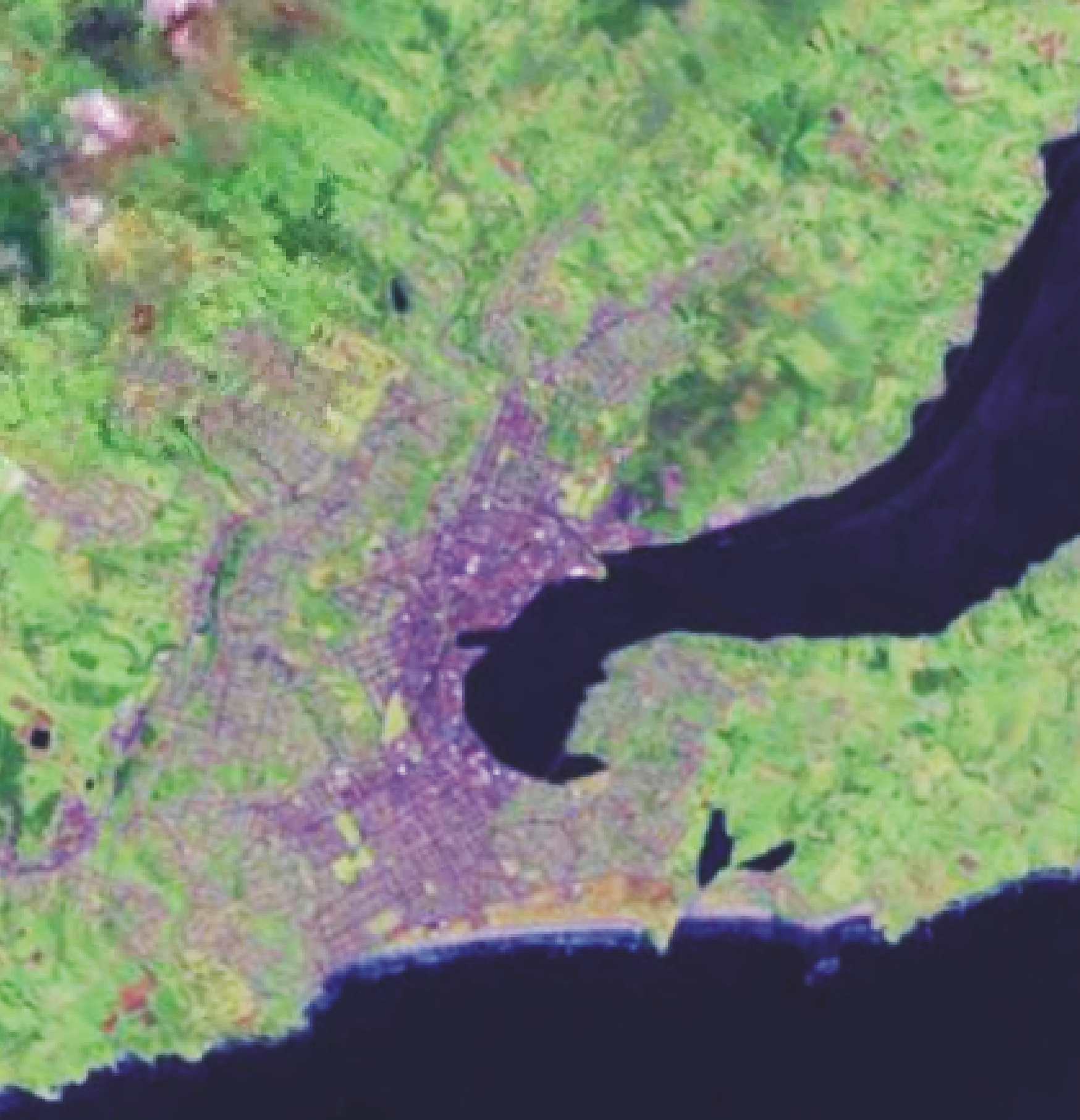
- Location within New Zealand Dunedin
- Location: Dunedin, New Zealand
- Coordinates: 45.901955°S 170.545389°E
- Catchment area: 466 ha (4.66 km^{2})
- Surface area: 30 ha (0.30 km^{2})

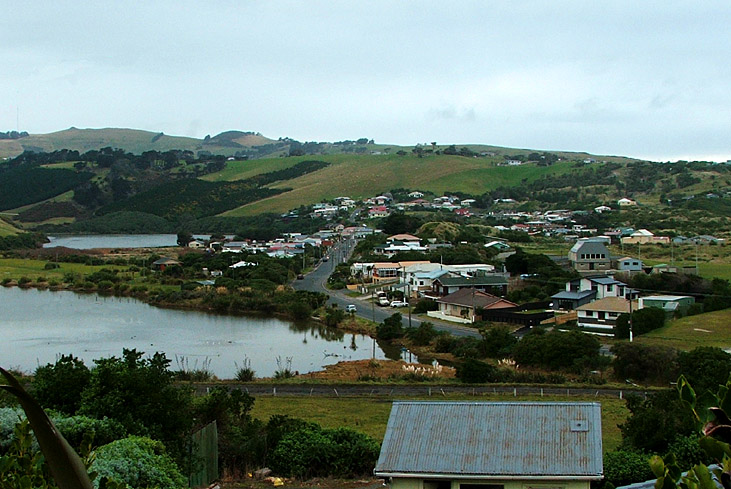
The settlement of Ocean Grove sits close to the southern shore of the Lagoon's two lobes- the Bottom Lagoon is visible at the lower left, and the Top Lagoon can be seen behind it.

Tomahawk Lagoon is a twin-lobed lagoon, located at the western end of the Otago Peninsula within the city limits of Dunedin, New Zealand. It lies close to the southeastern edge of the city's main urban area, near the suburb of Ocean Grove, which lies close to its southern shore. This suburb was also known as Tomahawk until the 1930s.

== Name ==
The name "Tomahawk", documented in the Otago Witness from 1852, is unlikely to be a reference to the weapon. It is more likely an anglicized form of the Māori words toma haka, often interpreted as "dance by a gravesite". Toma means a place of bones, or shrine for bones; haka is here taken to mean the Māori dance of challenge, but may rather be the Southern Māori form of the word hanga, to build or create. However, there are no known pre-European burial sites or reported finds of human bones in the area.

== Physical geography ==
The lagoon, which is connected by a short stream to the Pacific Ocean, is noted for its bird life. Despite its name, it is never inundated with the sea, but is more of a shallow coastal lake, predominantly under 1.5 metres (4.9 ft) in depth. The top lagoon (inner lobe) is a wildlife reserve. Tomahawk Lagoon is separated from the sea at low tide by Tomahawk Beach, which runs east from the Lagoon's mouth for about 1 kilometre (0.62 mi). A smaller beach, Smaills Beach, lies further to the east, beyond which is the outcrop of Maori Head, 2 kilometres (1.2 mi) from the lagoon's mouth. A rocky reef and the small Bird Island lie close to the headland. To the west of the lagoon's mouth is the prominent headland of Lawyers Head, a major Dunedin landmark.

The outer lobe (the Bottom Lagoon) is the larger, being some 900 metres (3,000 ft) in length and 300 metres (980 ft) wide at its widest point. It is roughly a parallelogram in shape, and covers an area of close to 20 hectares (49 acres). The Top Lagoon joins the Bottom Lagoon via a short stream in the middle of the latter's eastern shore. It is roughly triangular, being 700 metres (2,300 ft) in length and 300 metres (980 ft) in width, and covers an area of some 9.6 hectares (24 acres). The total area of the lagoon is thus some 30 hectares (74 acres).

The total catchment area of the lagoon is 466 hectares (1,150 acres). Several small streams flow through the steep valleys which lie to the north and northeast. The largest of these is Lagoon Creek, which flows from near Arthur's Seat for some 1.5 kilometres (0.93 mi) before feeding the Top Lagoon at its northeastern end. Owing to the pastoral nature of much of the surrounding land, nutrient runoff into the lake is frequently high, resulting in its often eutrophic nature.
