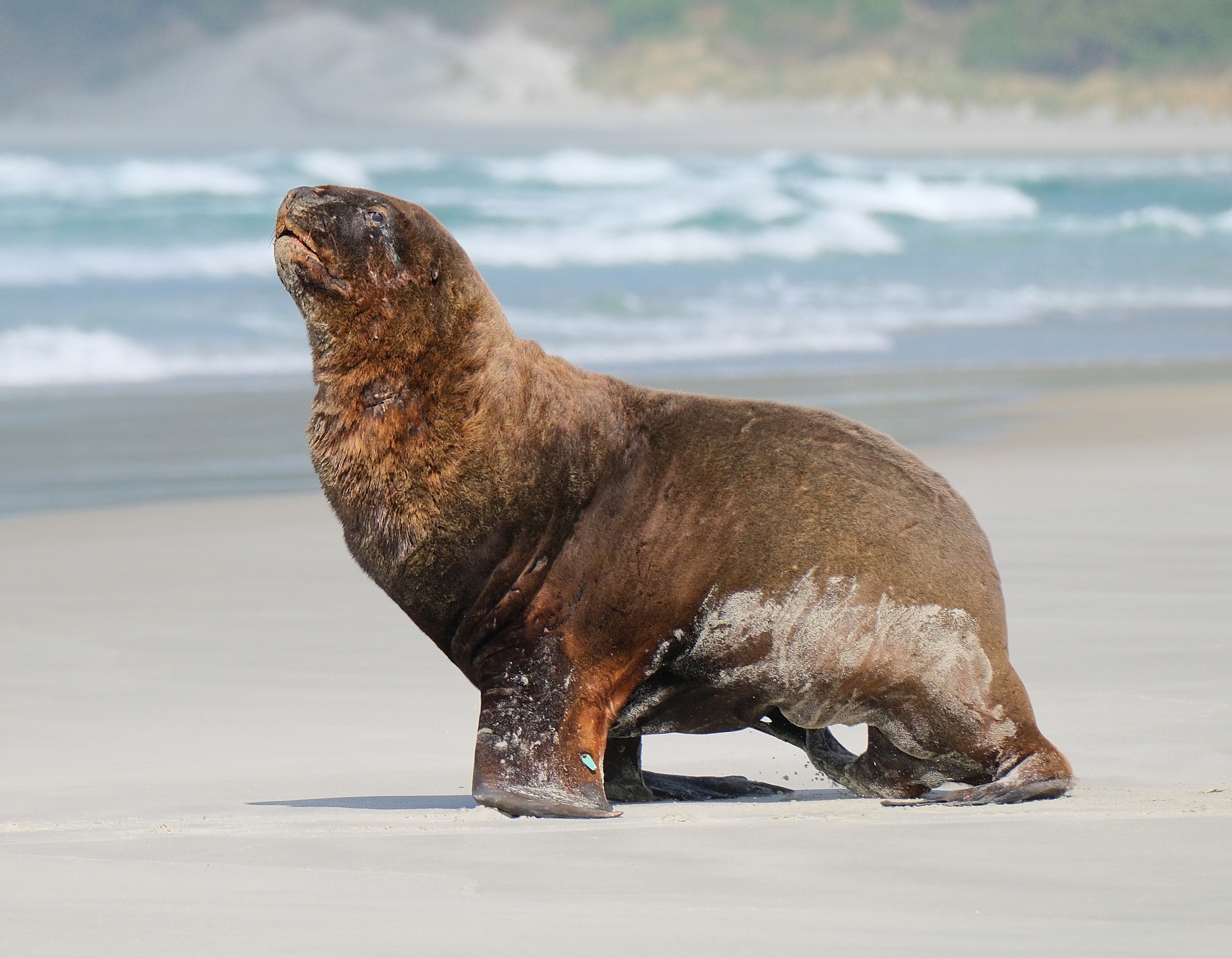
- Male
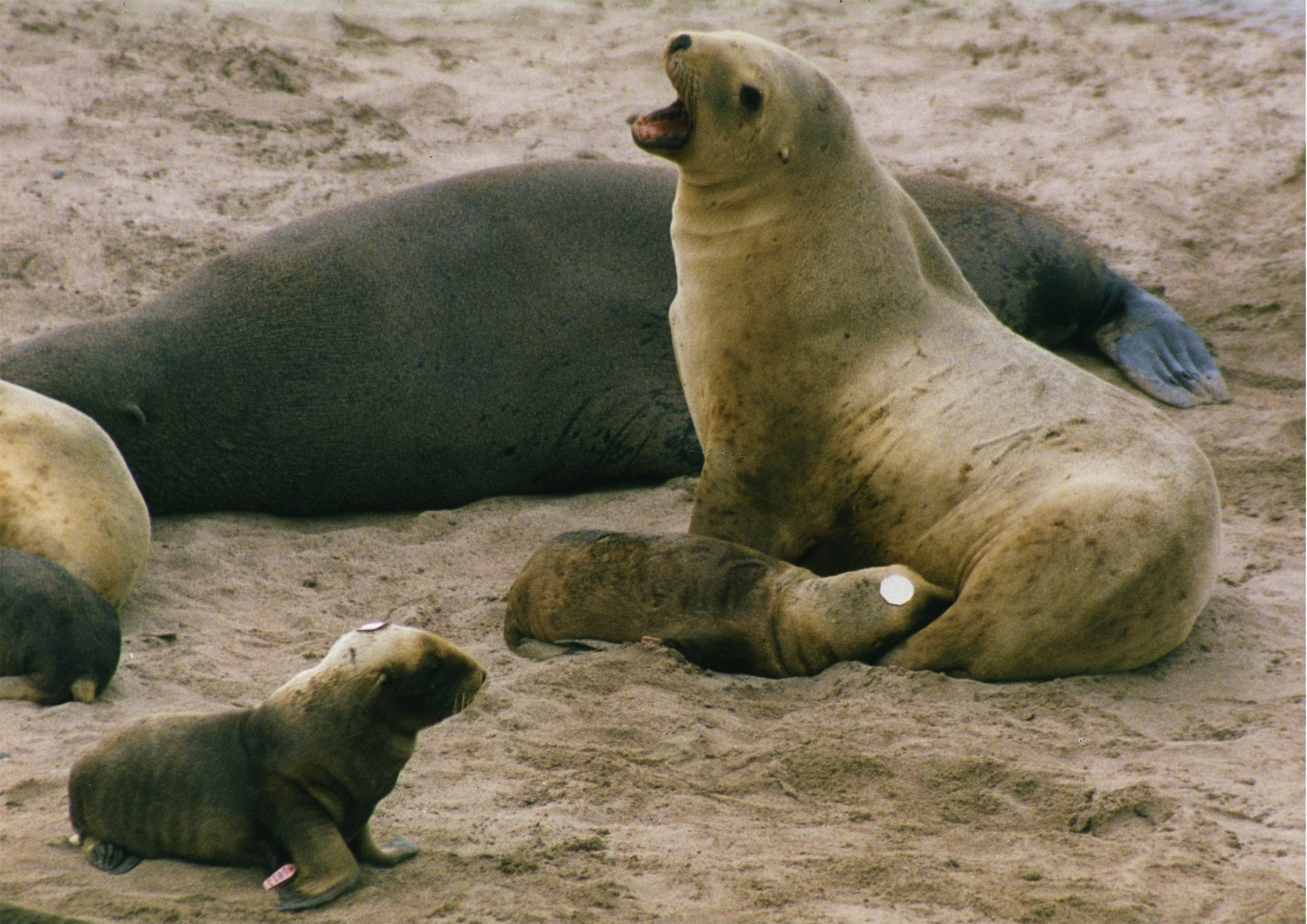
- Female with pup

Conservation status
- Endangered (IUCN 3.1)

Scientific classification
- Kingdom: Animalia
- Phylum: Chordata
- Class: Mammalia
- Order: Carnivora
- Parvorder: Pinnipedia
- Family: Otariidae
- Genus: Phocarctos; Peters, 1866
- Species: P. hookeri

Binomial name
- Phocarctos hookeri (Gray, 1844)
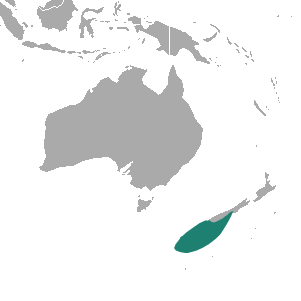
- New Zealand sea lion range

= New Zealand sea lion =

Species of mammal

The New Zealand sea lion (Phocarctos hookeri), once known as Hooker's sea lion, and as pakake (for both male and female) or whakahao (male) and kake (female) in Māori, is a species of sea lion that is endemic to New Zealand and primarily breeds on New Zealand's subantarctic Auckland and Campbell islands, and have in recent years been slowly breeding and recolonising around the coast of New Zealand's South and Stewart islands. The New Zealand sea lion population estimate is less than 10,000 individuals and fewer than 5,000 breeding adults. This number has declined from an estimated population of over 15,000 in the early 2000s, and it is one of the world's rarest sea lion species. It is the only species of the genus Phocarctos.

== Physiology and behaviour ==
New Zealand sea lions are one of the largest New Zealand animals. Like all otariids, they have marked sexual dimorphism; adult males are 240–350 centimetres (7.9–11.5 ft) long and weigh 320–450 kilograms (710–990 lb), while adult females are 180–200 centimetres (5.9–6.6 ft) long and weigh 90–160 kilograms (200–350 lb). At birth, pups are 70–100 centimetres (2.3–3.3 ft) long and weigh 8–10 kilograms (18–22 lb); the natal pelage is a thick coat of dark brown hair that becomes dark grey with cream markings on the top of the head, nose, tail and at the base of the flippers. Adult females' coats vary from buff to creamy grey with darker pigmentation around the muzzle and the flippers. Adult males are blackish-brown with a well-developed black mane of coarse hair reaching the shoulders. New Zealand sea lions are strongly philopatric.

The New Zealand sea lion's terrestrial behaviour is unique among other pinniped species. In the breeding season, female New Zealand sea lions gradually move inland with their pups to protect them from harassment by males, wind, storms, and potential parasitic infections. They can move up to 2 kilometres (1.2 mi) inland, from sandy beaches to tall grasses, and into forests. They are the only pinniped species known to disperse far inland and have a preference for forests. As mainland populations have grown since the 1990s, this behaviour has led to an increasing incidence of sea lions entering human spaces.

== Distribution ==
The main breeding populations are at the Auckland and Campbell Islands in the New Zealand subantarctic, where approximately 99% of the species' annual pup production occurs. There are currently three functioning breeding rookeries on the Auckland Islands. Most sea lions are born on Dundas Island. A smaller rookery exists at Sandy Bay on Enderby Island and the smallest rookery is on Figure of Eight Island. An even smaller rookery at South East Point on Auckland Island appears to now have been abandoned. The other major breeding area is the Campbell Islands.

Historically, New Zealand sea lions were distributed all over mainland New Zealand and Stewart Island, but were extirpated from these areas due to human hunting activities. For the first time in over 150 years, sea lions began breeding again on the South Island coast in 1993, on the Otago Peninsula after a seven-year-old sea lion nicknamed "Mum" gave birth. In the 2025–26 breeding season, 38 pups were born in the Otago region. Other small populations of breeding sea lions have recently begun to establish in various parts of the Stewart Island coastline and have been observed on the Catlins coast south of the Clutha River.

Recent DNA information indicates the New Zealand sea lion is a lineage previously restricted to subantarctic regions. Somewhere between 1300 and 1500 AD, a genetically distinct mainland lineage was wiped out by the first Maori settlers, and the subantarctic lineage has since then gradually filled the ecological niche. It has been inferred from middens and ancient DNA that a third lineage was made extinct at the Chatham Islands due to predation by the Moriori people.

== Diet and predation ==
New Zealand sea lions are known to prey on a wide range of species including fish such as Antarctic horsefish, red cod, opalfish and Patagonian toothfish, rays, sharks, cephalopods (e.g. New Zealand arrow squid and yellow octopus), crustaceans, seabirds and other marine mammals, and even New Zealand fur seals. Studies indicate a strong location effect on diet, with almost no overlap in prey species comparing sea lions at Otago Peninsula and Campbell Island, at the north and south extents of the species' breeding range. New Zealand sea lions are in turn preyed on by great white sharks, with 27% showing evidence of scarring from near-miss shark attacks in an opportunistic study of adult New Zealand sea lions at Sandy Bay, Enderby Island.

== Status ==
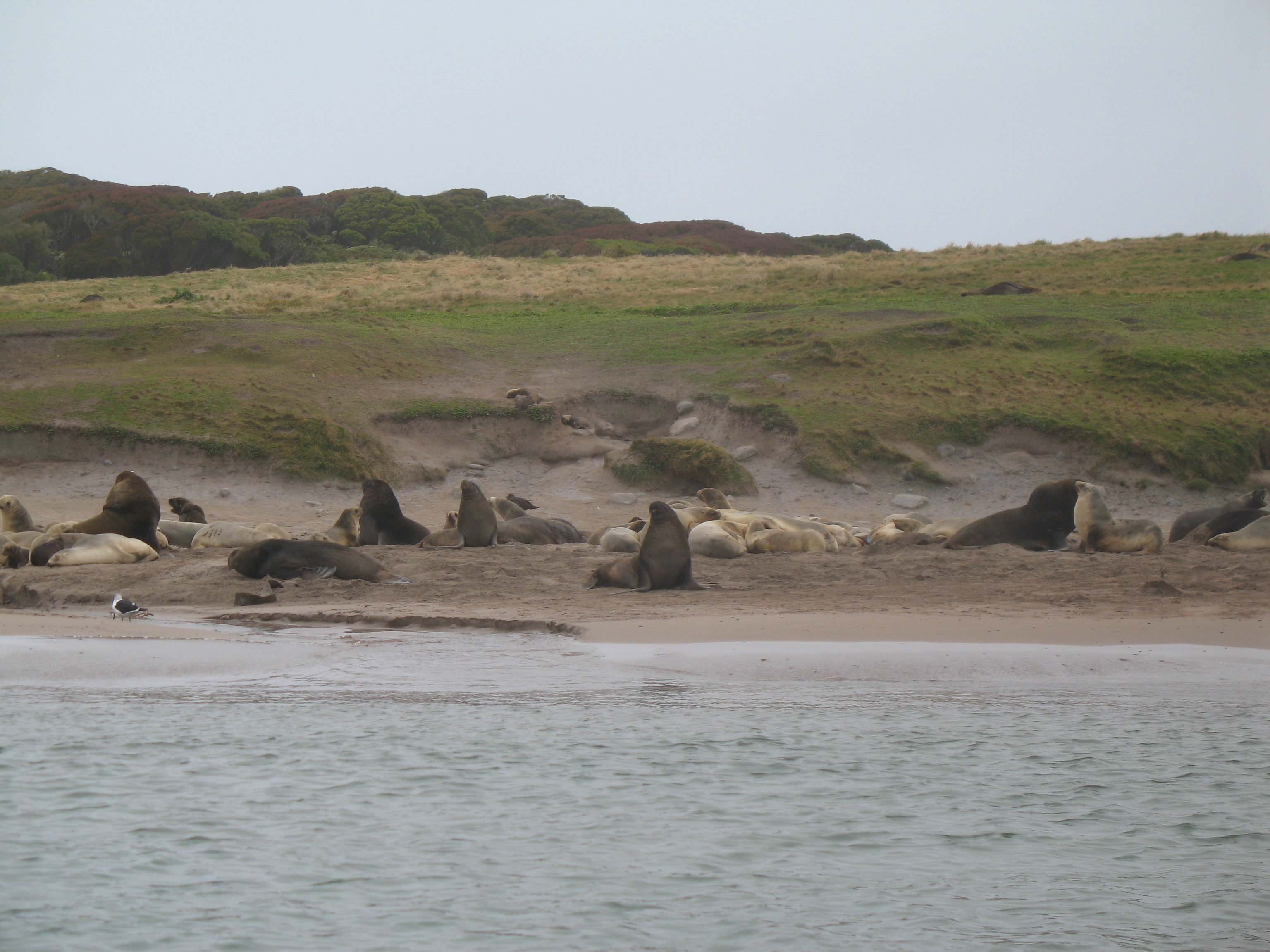
One of the colonies at Enderby Island

New Zealand sea lions are considered the most threatened sea lion in the world. The species' status is largely driven by the main breeding population at the Auckland Islands, which declined by ~50% between 2000 and 2015. The 2013 sea lion pup production count on the Auckland Islands showed the number of pups born on the islands has risen to 1931, from the 2012 figure of 1684 (dead pups are also counted, since the annual pup count is used to assess the population of breeding females, but not future births when the counted pups mature). The 2013 number was the highest in five years. The Campbell Island population 'appears to be increasing slowly' and births here comprise ~30% of the species' total. The Otago and Stewart Island sea lion populations are currently small, though increasing. Population estimates for the whole species declined from ~15,000 in the mid-1990s to 9,000 in 2008 (based on the number of pups born).

In 2010, the Department of Conservation—responsible for marine mammal conservation—changed the New Zealand Threat Classification System ranking from Nationally Endangered to Nationally Critical. The Department of Conservation estimates that Auckland Islands' sea lions, nearly 80% of the total, could be functionally extinct by 2035. However, the New Zealand Ministry for Primary Industries considers research on which this prediction is based is low quality and 'should not be used in management decisions'. In 2015, the International Union for Conservation of Nature (IUCN) changed the classification of this species to "Endangered", based on low overall population size, the small number of breeding populations and the projected trend of the Auckland Islands breeding population.

In 2019, the New Zealand sea lion's status was found to have improved and they are now "Nationally Vulnerable". Their overall rate of population decline has slowed in most breeding locations and Stewart Island was officially recognised as a new breeding colony in 2018. Their global IUCN status remains "Endangered".

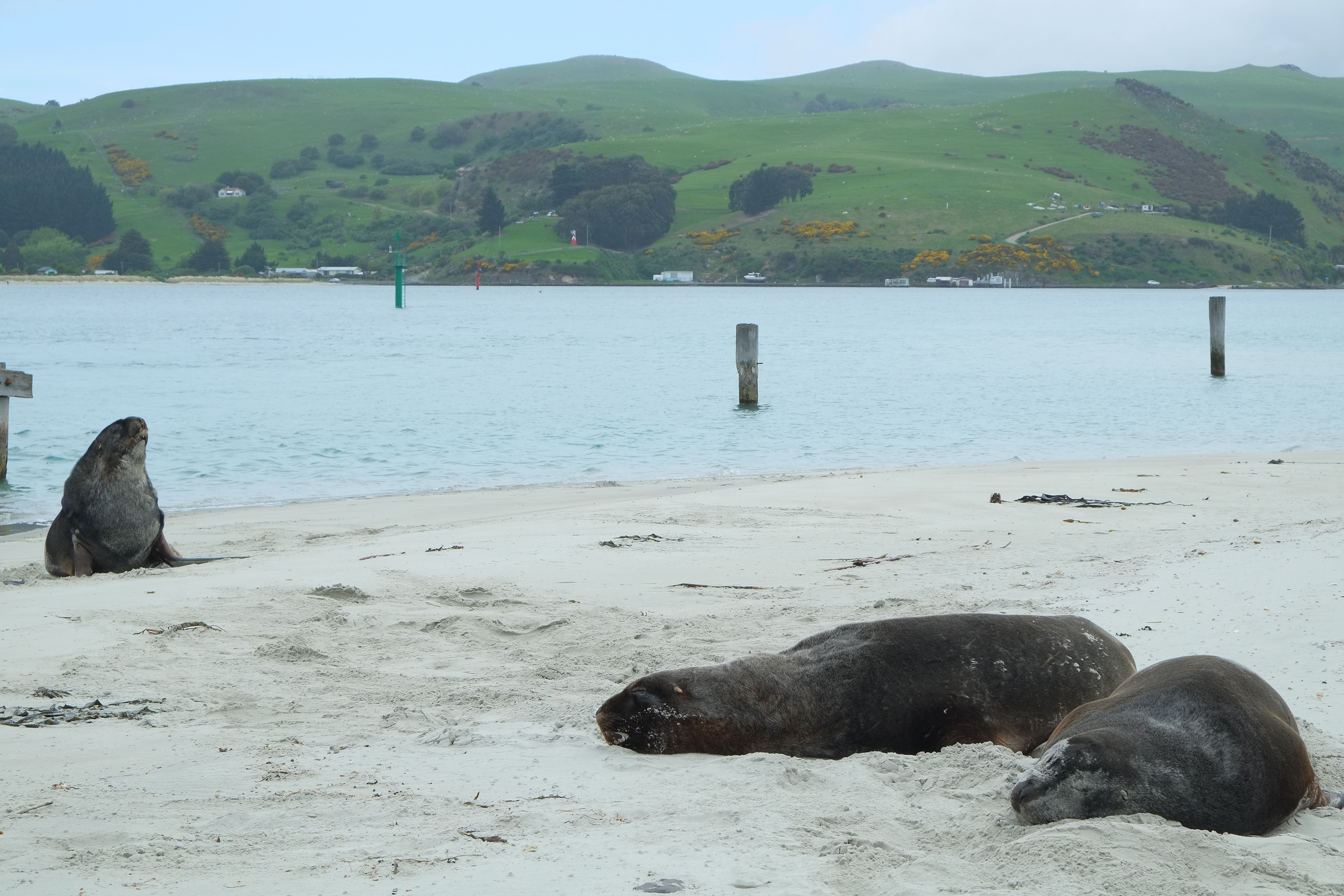
Sea lions at Aramoana, Otago Harbour

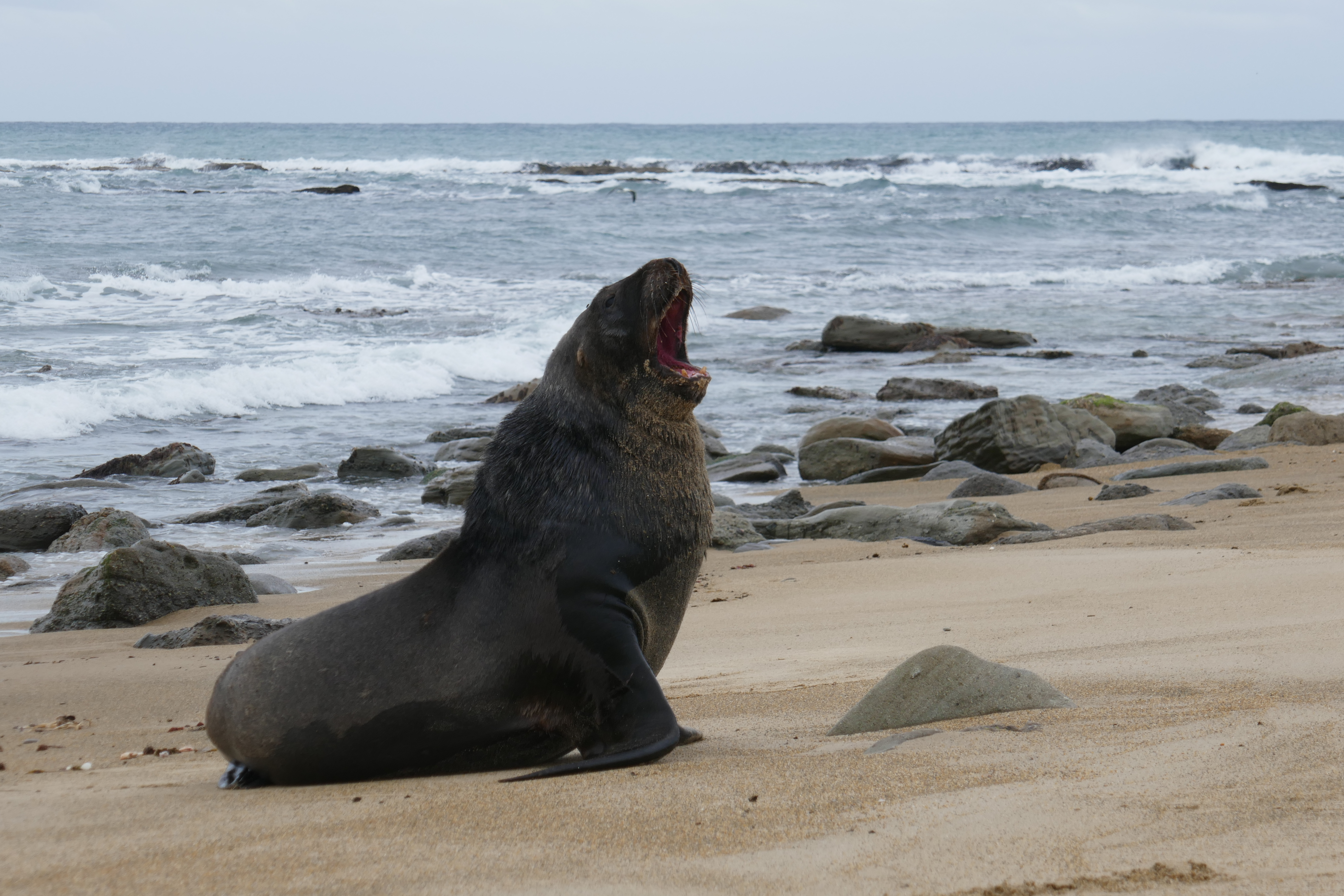
Male yawning at Waipapa Point

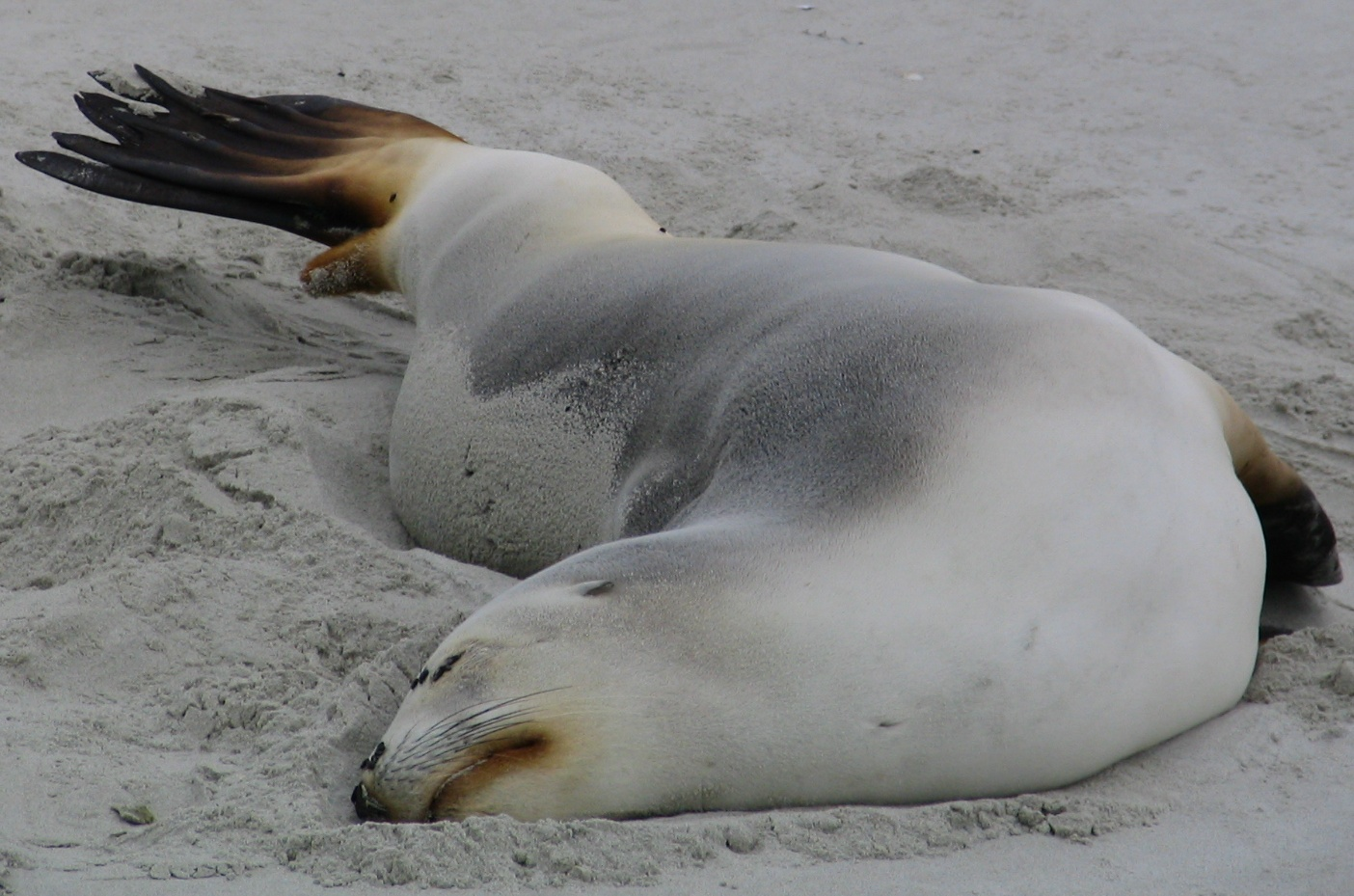
Female sleeping at Victory Beach

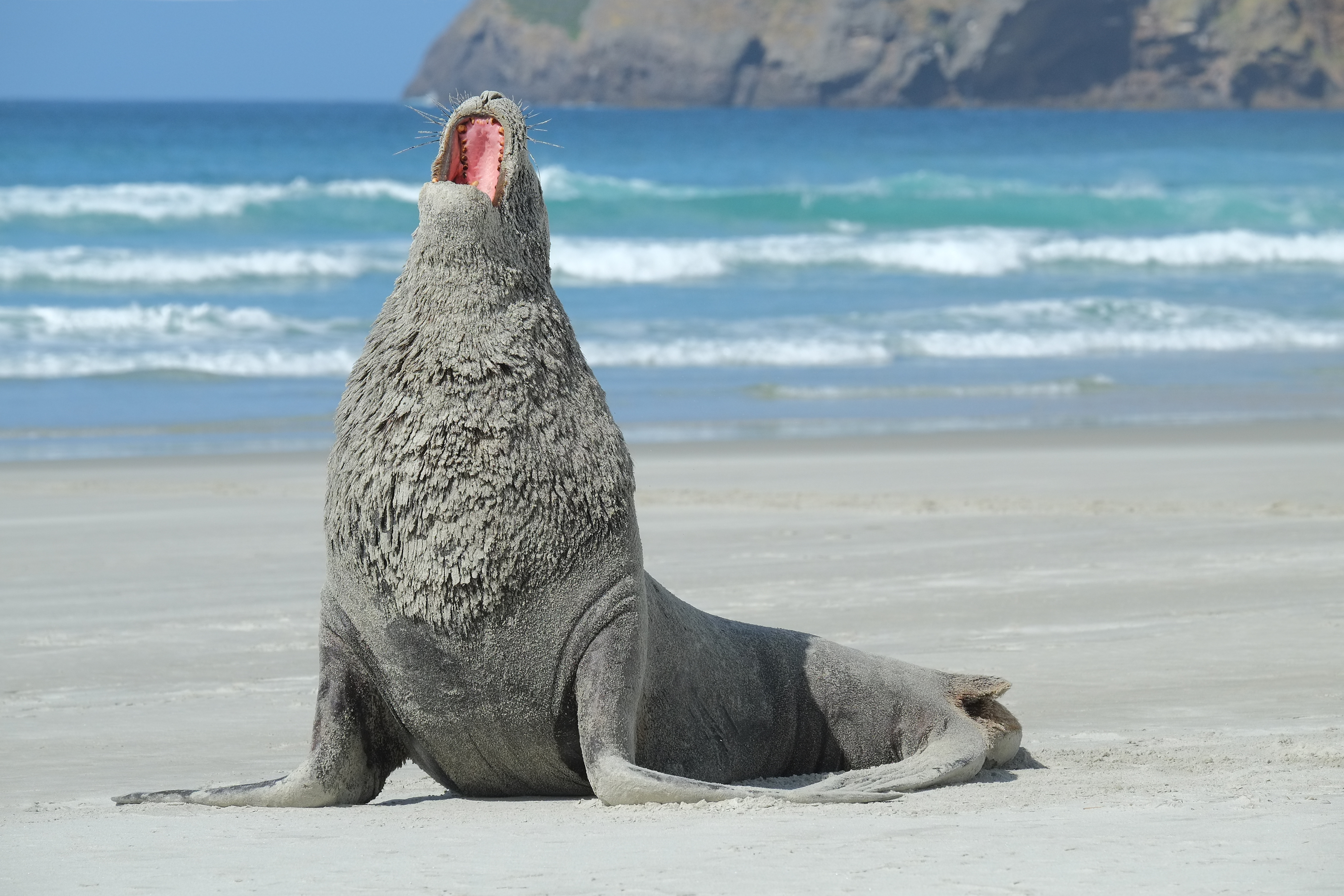
Sand-covered male yawning on a beach on Otago Peninsula

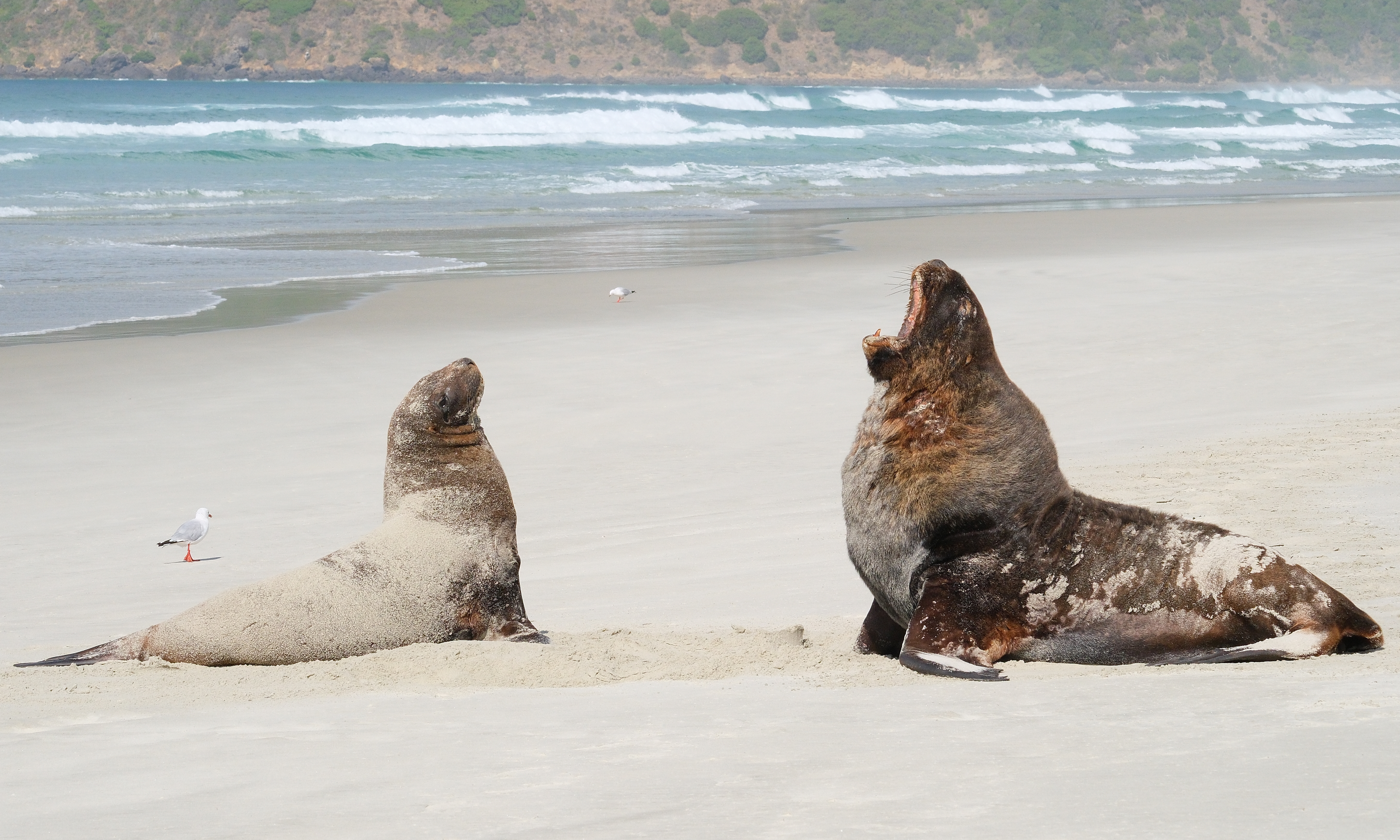
Female (left) and male (right, yawning)

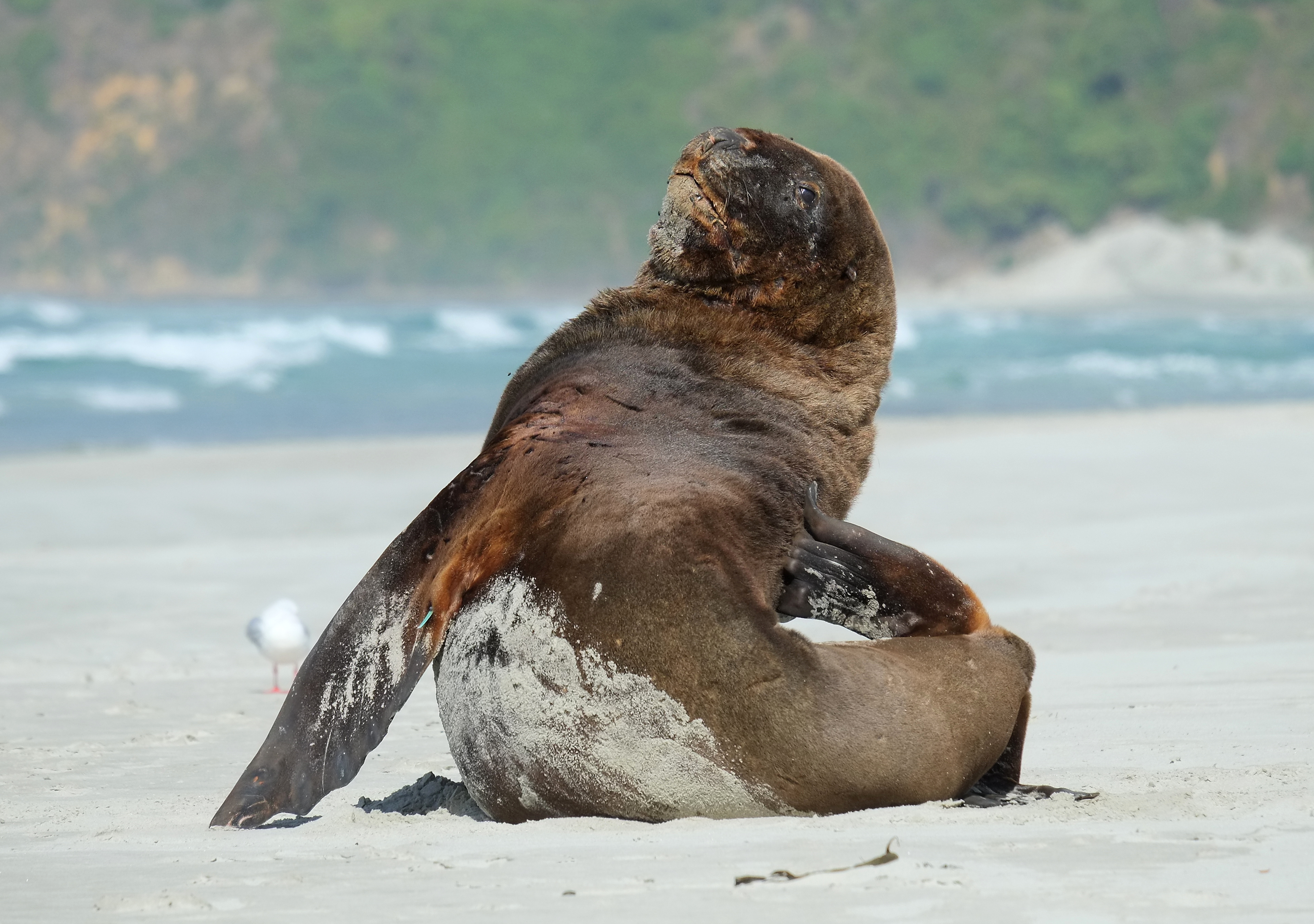
Male scratching itself at Otago Peninsula

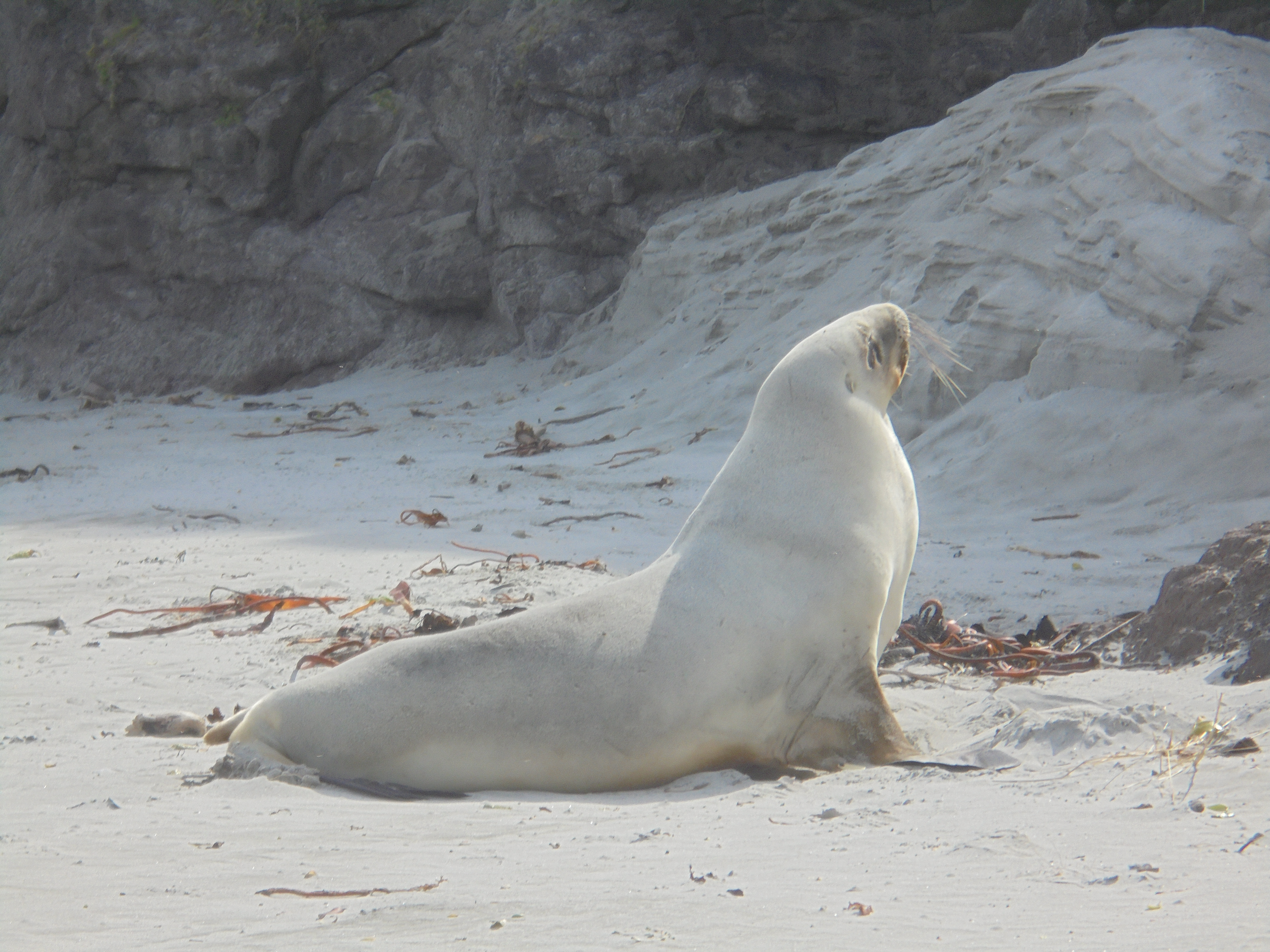
Female on Smaills Beach

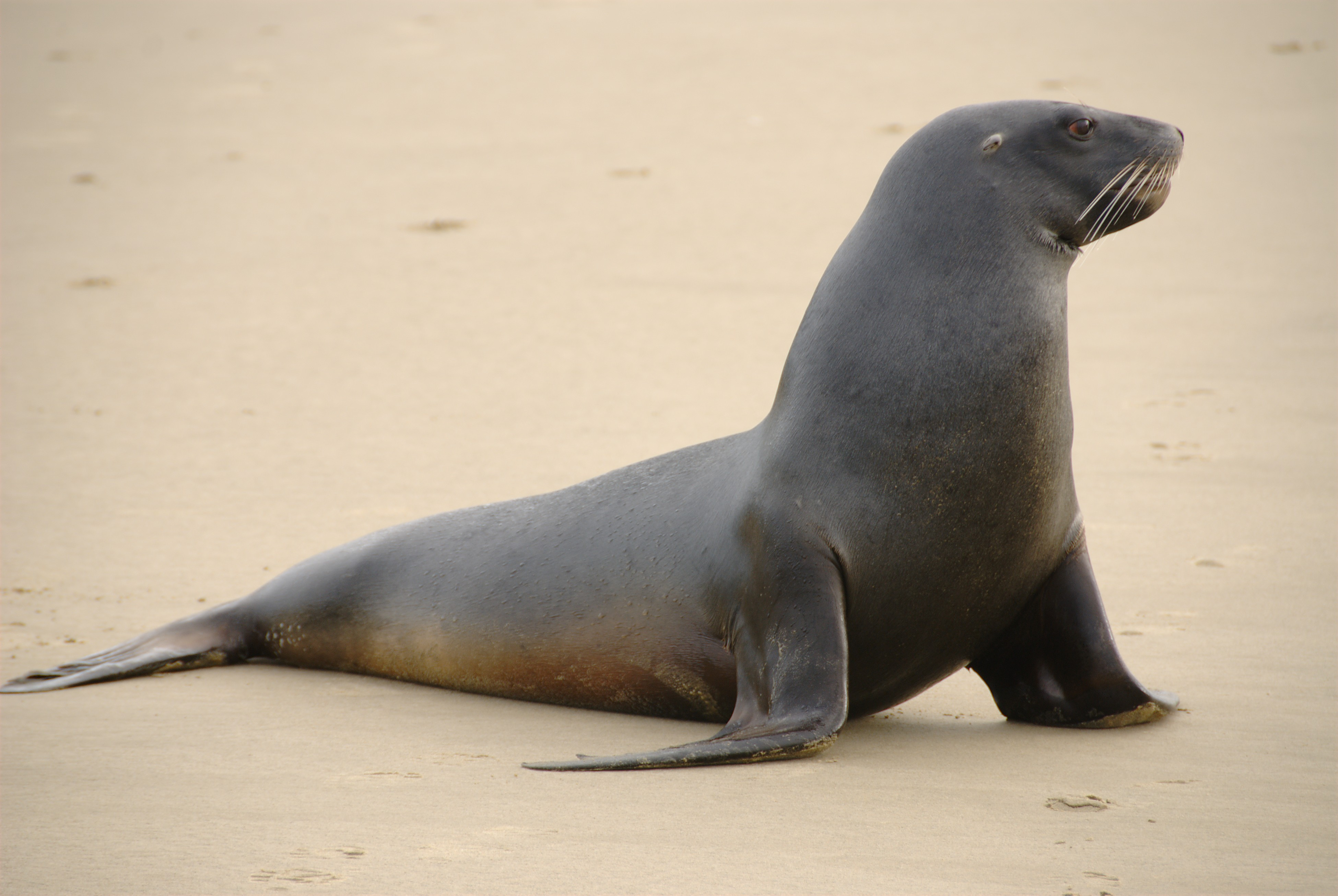
A male New Zealand sea lion

== Threats ==
=== Subsistence hunting and commercial sealing ===
Subsistence hunting and commercial harvest of sea lions greatly reduced the breeding range and population size of New Zealand sea lions between the 13th and 19th Centuries. In 1893, sealing for both New Zealand sea lions and New Zealand fur seals was prohibited by law in New Zealand. In their book The Animals of New Zealand, Frederick Hutton and James Drummond described the hunt for the New Zealand sea lion:—

The Auckland Islands were the scene of sealing activity for many years, the first expeditions setting out from Sydney early in the nineteenth century. The industry, which was conducted on a large scale, reached the height of its prosperity between 1810 and 1820. The sealers had to suffer great hardships, but they were attracted by the lucrative trade, and large numbers of seals were slaughtered in the race for wealth.

=== Commercial fishery bycatch ===
In the 1990s, as the volume of squid fishing around the Auckland Islands increased, numbers of sea lions were captured as bycatch and drowned in the squid trawl nets. The government uses a modelling system to set a fishing-related mortality limit (FRML) each year. If the limit is predicted to be exceeded, the Minister of Primary Industries may close the fishery. The last time the FRML was exceeded was in 2000, though a number of closures occurred in the 1990s.

In late February 2013, the first observed sea lion mortalities in the Auckland Island squid fleet in three years occurred. Juvenile sea lions slipped through the grid at the opening of the net into its cod end. The 23-cm grid aperture is designed to hold adult sea lions in the SLED (sea lion exclusion device) and yet still allow squid to pass into the net. In 2013, one adult female was taken as incidental bycatch.

In August 2013, the seasonal southern blue whiting fleet captured 21 male sea lions in fishing grounds more than 100 km off the Campbell Islands. Four were released alive. No captures were reported by government observers the year before. The government responded to the captures by requesting the vessels try sea lion exclusion devices (SLEDs) to reduce this bycatch.

The estimated captures in the 2014 season were 11.58% of the FRML. The proportion of vessels in the Auckland Island squid fishery with government observers has increased over the years, providing independent reports of bycatch based on observation rather than computer model estimates. During the 2014 season, the observers' coverage was of 84% of tows. In the concluded 2014 season, two sea lions were reportedly captured in the fishery.

==== Sea lion exclusion devices ====
In 2001, the sea lion exclusion device (SLED) was introduced into the Auckland Island squid fishery to reduce sea lion bycatch. Conservation advocates have supported SLED use to protect other marine animals or sharks. Since 2007, all vessels in the Auckland Islands fishery have been equipped with SLEDs. Some scientists do not believe sea lions survive the interaction with a SLED, though the Ministry for Primary Industries (MPI) believes the direct effect of fishing-related mortality on the sea lion population is minimal. MPI has concluded that a sea lion has an 85% chance of escaping the SLED and a 97 per cent probability of surviving a SLED escape, though it says this estimate may be 'mildly pessimistic'.

=== Food limitation ===
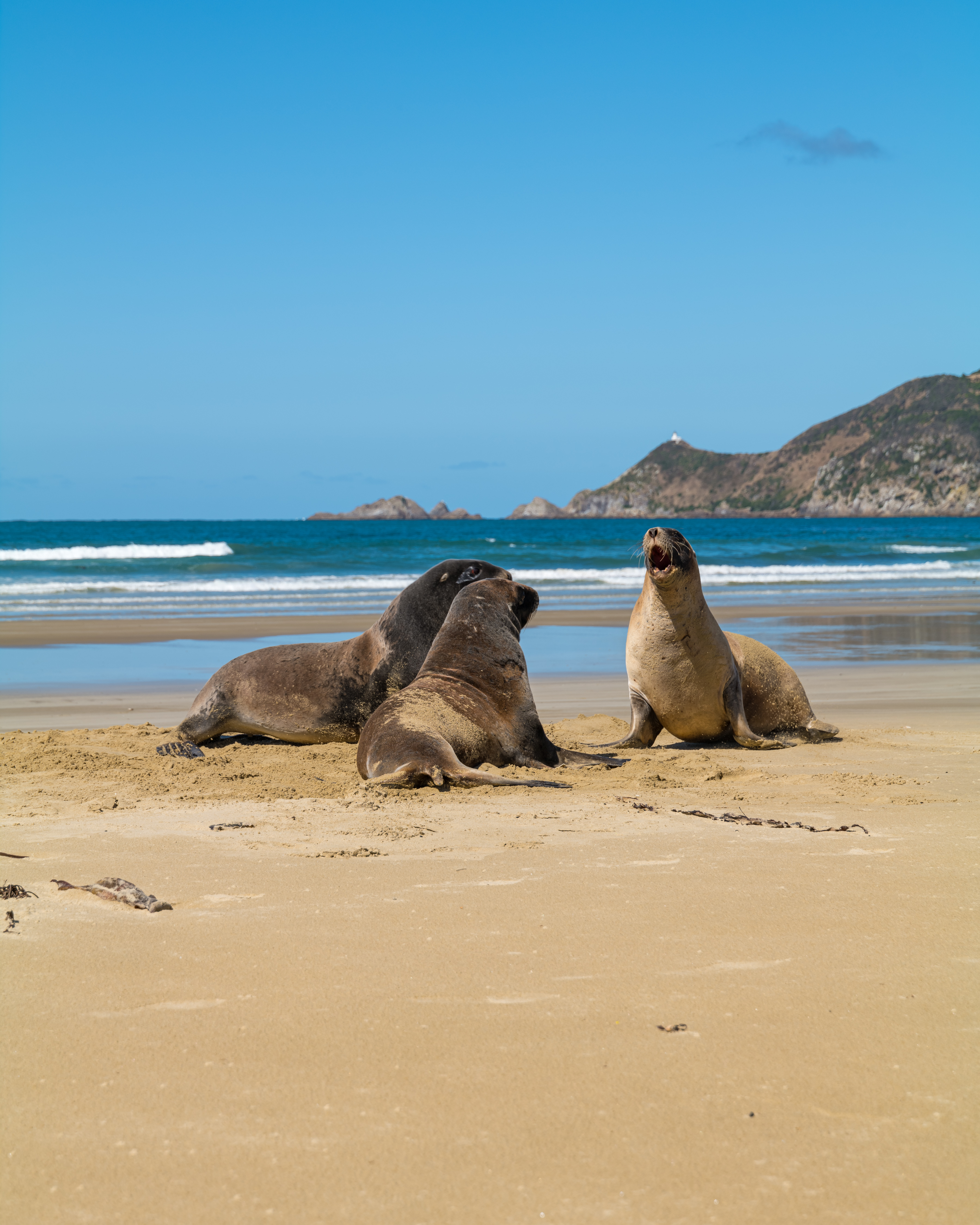
New Zealand sea lions on the beach at Kaka Point

Food availability is a well-known, major cause of population change in pinniped species. The Auckland Islands population has displayed numerous indicators of food limitation during the recent decline in breeder numbers, including: poor maternal condition, delayed maturation, years with very low pupping rate, low survival of pups born and long-term shifts in diet composition. Starvation was provisionally identified as cause of mortality for 62% of pups necropsied at Campbell Island in 2015, when 58% of all pups born were estimated to have died in the first month of life.

=== Disease ===
Though the Auckland Island sea lion pup production is highly variable, a decline trend for some years followed the outbreak of an introduced bacterial disease caused by a Campylobacter species in 1998 which killed an estimated 53% of newborn pups and 20% of adult females. In 2002, another probably introduced bacterial disease caused by Klebsiella pneumoniae killed 32% of pups, and in 2003 another 21% of the pups. Since 2002, K. pneumoniae bacteria have caused significant mortality in the sea lion pups at Enderby Island. Infected pups have meningitis, as well as sepsis. On 12 March 2014, the Conservation Minister Nick Smith was quoted as saying an "excessive focus on fishing bycatch" existed and 300 pups had died the previous summer from an as yet unidentified disease.

=== Mainland threats ===
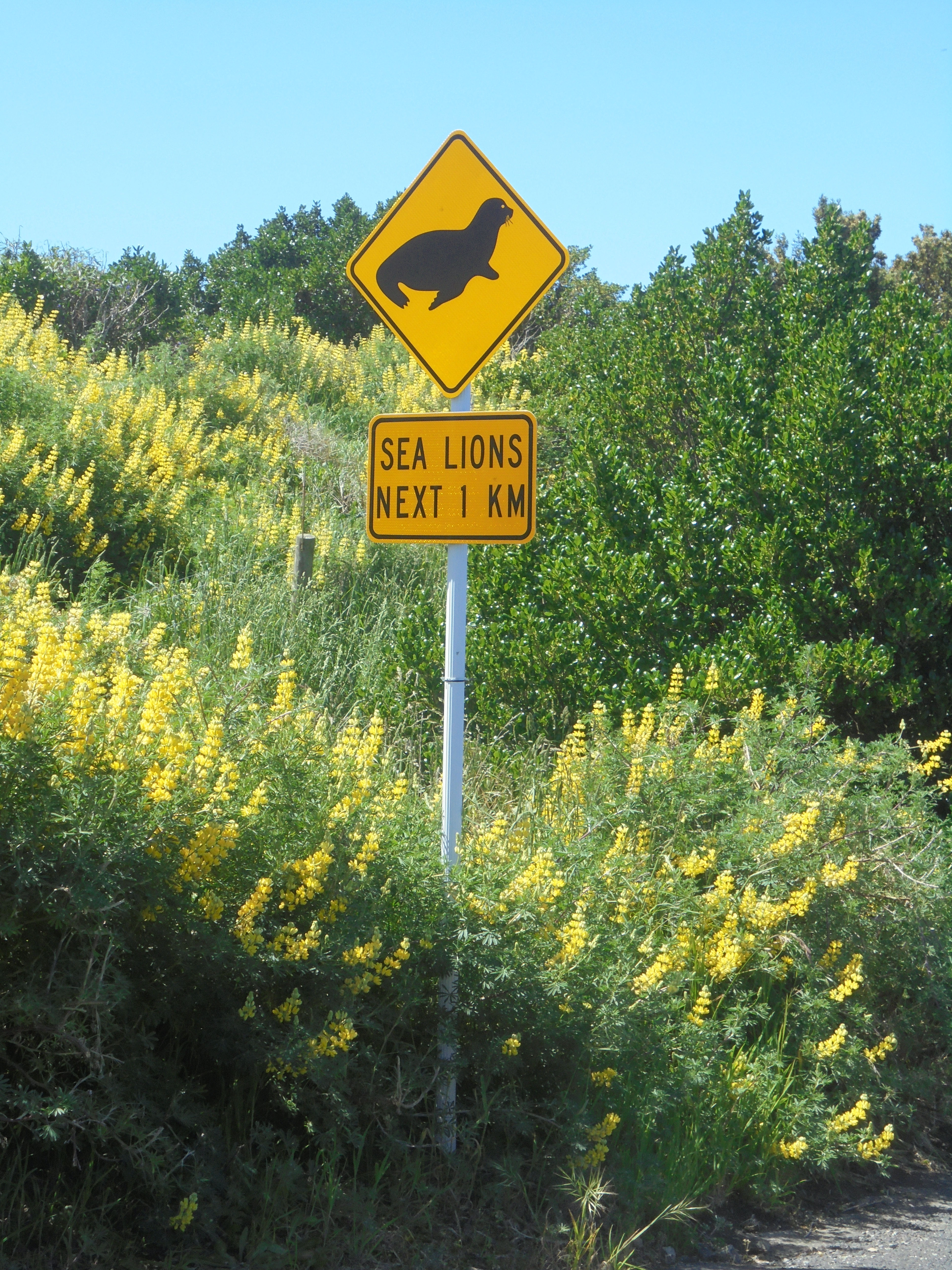
A traffic sign on Tomahawk Road, Dunedin

The mainland population was estimated to reach 1000 animals by 2044, leading to issues of 'marine protected areas, local fishing quotas and numbers management'.

New Zealand sea lions are projected to potentially distribute all around mainland New Zealand, but they face potential human conflicts, especially due to their unique inland movement behaviour. Sea lions have been reported entering residential spaces including backyards, homes, a community swimming pool, a golf course, a playground, and a fish-and-chip shop. Females and pups on the mainland have adapted to commercial pine plantations, which are privately owned lands. Infrastructure such as roads and fences pose barriers to their inland movement. Sea lions have been hit by cars on roads, and deliberately killed, harassed, and clubbed. There have been incidents of disturbance from domestic dogs.

In order to ensure the protection of New Zealand sea lions, the Department of Conservation works to engage with local communities and spread awareness on this species' recolonisation and behaviour.

== See also ==
- Australian sea lion
