= Lawyers Head =

Headland in Dunedin, New Zealand

Coordinates: 45.909839°S 170.53515°E

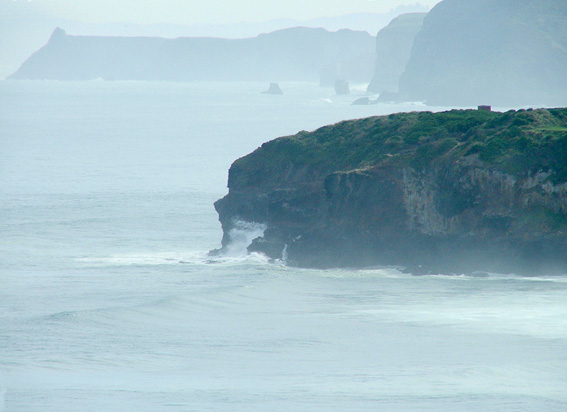
Lawyers Head seen from the east. Forbury Hill (upper right) and Blackhead (extreme top left) can be seen in the background

Lawyers Head (often punctuated as the more grammatically correct Lawyer's Head) is a prominent landmark on the coast of Otago, New Zealand. Located within the city of Dunedin, this rocky headland juts into the Pacific Ocean at the eastern end of the city's main beach, Saint Kilda Beach. It is named for the likeness of the cliff face to the profile of a lawyer in traditional legal wig.

The promontory, which reaches a height of 34 m, is connected to the city by the road John Wilson Ocean Drive, which runs parallel to the beach. The head itself commands a view across the city's southern suburbs and along the Otago coast for over 80 kilometres to the southwest. On a clear day Nugget Point in The Catlins can be discerned, and the Nugget Point lighthouse's beam can be seen at night. To the east, the suburb of Ocean Grove and the nearby Tomahawk Lagoon lie beneath the headland.

John Wilson Ocean Drive was closed from August 2006, to allow construction of the Tahuna Wastewater Treatment Plant outfall. The road closure had an unexpected benefit of stopping suicides from the headland; there were 13 deaths in the 10 years prior. Access to the headland was restored briefly in October 2009, but closed when there was another death less than three days after full access was restored. New Zealand Police Inspector Dave Campbell stated "Lawyer's Head now has the unenviable reputation of having the highest number of deaths by suicide in one location in New Zealand".

One of a series of headlands which punctuate much of this section of the Otago coast, it is its proximity to the centre of the city and its distinctive shape which make it particularly well known. Other nearby headlands nearby include the higher 75 m Maori Head, one kilometre to the east, the cliffs along the coast of Forbury Hill three kilometres to the west, the natural arch of Tunnel Beach three kilometres beyond Forbury Hill, and Blackhead two kilometres to the southwest of Tunnel Beach.

These basalt outcrops were all formed during the eruption of the Dunedin Volcano some 12-15 million years ago. The crater of this long-extinct volcano now forms Otago Harbour, and its rim is the ring of hills which circle Dunedin and form the ridge of the Otago Peninsula.

Lawyers Head is an integral part of Chisholm Park Golf Links, developed by the city of Dunedin in 1933. The Links has hosted the New Zealand amateur championship, the New Zealand Masters teams event, and many Australasian Tour events and Pro-ams. The course boasts several holes rated among Otago's best, including the ninth hole, also named "Lawyers Head", which is arguably the country's finest hole. This hole follows the curve of the cliffs, such that a direct line between tee and cup passes over the waters below.

The promontory is also located close to Andersons Bay Cemetery, which lies immediately inland from Lawyers Head.
