= Khin Thet Htay =

First Lady of Myanmar

- ခင်သက်ဌေး

First Lady of Myanmar
- In role 1 February 2021 – 7 August 2025
- President: Myint Swe (acting)
- Preceded by: Cho Cho
- Succeeded by: Kyu Kyu Hla
- In role 21 March 2018 – 30 March 2018
- President: Myint Swe (acting)
- Preceded by: Su Su Lwin
- Succeeded by: Cho Cho

Second Lady of Myanmar
- In role 30 March 2016 – 7 August 2025 Serving with Anna Sui Hluan (until 2024)
- Vice President: Myint Swe
- Preceded by: Nang Shwe Hmone
Succeeded by	San San Aye	
Additional positions
Vice President of Myanmar Women's Affairs Federation
In office
early 2009 – ?
Patron of Yangon Region Women's Affairs

Personal details
- Born: Burma
- Spouse: Myint Swe (died 2025)
- Children: 2

Khin Thet Htay (Burmese: ခင်သက်ဌေး) is a former Second Lady of Myanmar and former acting First Lady of Myanmar. She initially became acting First Lady when her spouse became acting President for ten days in March 2018 and again after the coup d'état on 1 February 2021. She also served as Vice President of Myanmar Women's Affairs Federation in early 2009.

Her husband Myint Swe was sworn in as acting president under the Constitution of Myanmar, which also called for Pyidaungsu Hluttaw to select a new President within seven days of Htin Kyaw's resignation.

On 2 March 2023, the military government awarded her the title of Agga Maha Thiri Thudhamma Theingi, one of the country’s highest religious honors, for significantly contributing to the propagation of Buddhism.

Honorary titles
Preceded by Nang Shwe Hmone	Second Lady of Myanmar; 2016–2025	Succeeded by San San Aye
Preceded by Su Su Lwin	First Lady of Myanmar; Acting; 2018	Succeeded by Cho Cho
Preceded by Cho Cho	First Lady of Myanmar; Acting; 2021–2025	Succeeded by Kyu Kyu Hla
