= Myanmar–South Korea relations =

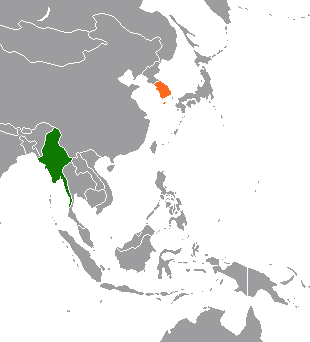
- Myanmar: South Korea

Diplomatic mission
- Embassy of Myanmar, Seoul: Embassy of South Korea, Yangon

Envoy
- Ambassador Thant Sin: Ambassador Lee Sang-hwa

Myanmar–South Korea relations (Burmese: မြန်မာ–တောင်ကိုရီးယား ဆက်ဆံရေး; Korean: 한국–미얀마 관계, romanized: Hanguk–Miyanma Gwangye) are the bilateral relations between the Republic of the Union of Myanmar and the Republic of Korea. The two countries established their diplomatic relations on 16 May 1975.

The history of contact between the two countries goes back to 1948, the year of the declaration of Burmese independence. Although the Burmese military junta and North Korea had cooperated over nuclear issues for the past few decades, Prime Minister U Nu initially favoured Syngman Rhee's South Korean government. During the Korean War, Burma donated 50,000 dollars' worth of rice to Korea and balanced the interest of both Koreas, taking into consideration the position of China.

Commercial and trade relationships between the two countries grew rapidly after the 2010s, when Myanmar implemented political reforms, South Korea being Myanmar's sixth largest foreign investor by August 2020.

== Historical background ==
Burma and South Korea already had contact in 1948 when Burma became independent. U Nu's government voted in favor of the motion in the UN that recognized Syngman Rhee's government as the legitimate government over all of Korea; however, Burma refused to recognize either state and wished to see a peaceful solution to the nascent Korean crisis. When the Korean War broke out, since Burma was seen as a country with a non-aligned orientation, it did not send troops to fight in Korea.

After the war, Burma began to develop contact with both Koreas in an unofficial setting. By 1961, there were non-ambassadorial consulates of both Koreas in Burma. Burma established formal diplomatic relations with both Koreas in May 1975, after Ne Win took power.

=== Rangoon bombing ===
On 9 October 1983, Chun Doo-hwan, fifth president of South Korea, made an official visit to the capital of Burma, Rangoon, and was the target of a failed assassination attempt, orchestrated by North Korea, at the Martyrs' Mausoleum. Although the president himself narrowly escaped, the bomb killed 21 people, including four cabinet ministers of South Korea.

== Recent history ==
=== Beginning of Myanmar's political reforms: 2010–2015 ===
South Korea's 10th president, Lee Myung-bak, visited Myanmar in May 2012, the first visit since the Rangoon bombing. It is reported that the then-Burmese President Thein Sein promised to follow the UN Security Council's resolution on North Korea's controversial nuclear and missile programs and said there was no nuclear cooperation with Pyongyang. Lee also met with then-opposition leader Aung San Suu Kyi at Sedona Hotel in Yangon on 15 May. She said that Burmese and South Koreans had things in common, such as both having to "take hard road to democratic leadership". In October of the same year, Thein Sein made a three-day visit to South Korea and also visited "unspecified military-related companies" in his tour.

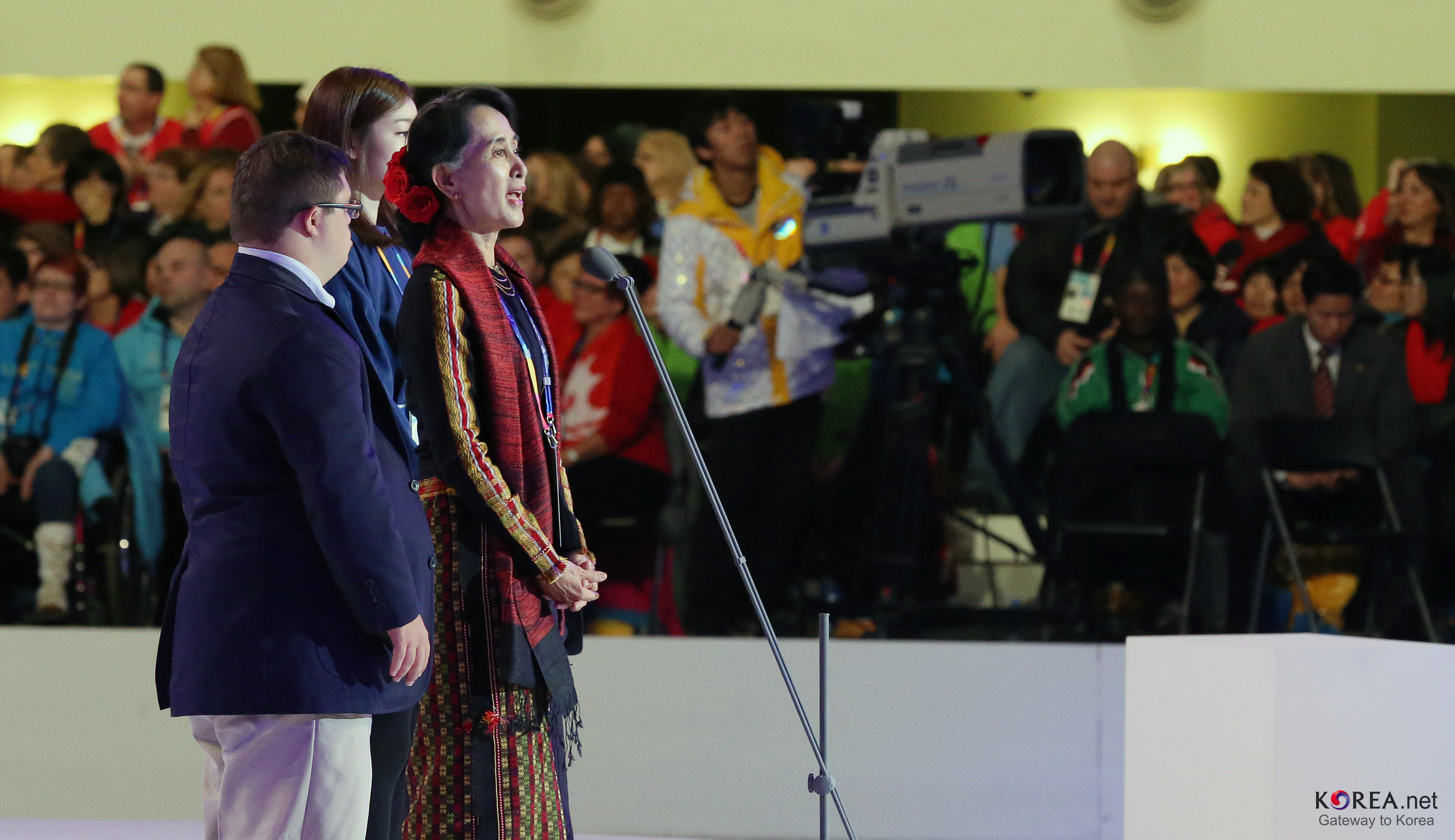
Aung San Suu Kyi greeting athletes at the 2013 Special Winter Olympics Opening Ceremony in Pyeongchang

In January 2013, Aung San Suu Kyi paid her first visit to South Korea and met with both President Lee and Park Geun-hye, president-elect at that time. She attended the opening ceremony of the 2013 Special Winter Olympics World Games in Pyeongchang and gave a keynote speech at the Global Development Summit, where she compared her life under house arrest to those with intellectual disabilities, saying that the "real revolution is the revolution of spirit". On 30 January, she received the 2004 Gwangju Prize for Human Rights in Gwangju, which was later cancelled by the foundation on 18 December 2018, due to her inaction on Rohingya issues.

=== Closer relations: 2016–2020 ===
From 3 to 5 September 2019, President Moon Jae-in and First Lady Kim Jung-sook travelled Myanmar, as part of their three-country tour, during which both Myanmar and Korean governments planned to discuss "sustainable win-win growth". During his trip, the two governments signed a total of 10 memorandums of understanding (MOUs) and a framework agreement on infrastructure and investments. 600 school buses were donated to Myanmar by South Korea. Moon addressed a business forum and joined the groundbreaking ceremony of the Myanmar–South Korea Industrial Complex Zone, to be completed in 2024, in Yangon. After his trip, Seoul launched the Joint Commission for Trade and Industrial Cooperation to further bilateral trade, and the Korea Trade-Investment Promotion Agency (KOTRA) opened a “Korea Desk” to increase business opportunities.

At a state dinner hosted by President Win Myint in honour of the Korean president and his wife in Naypyidaw, President Moon remembered Burma's help to Korea in the Korean War, stating "Korea still has not forgotten its gratitude." On 3 September, the two first ladies – Kim Jung-sook and Cho Cho – had an informal conversation at the Presidential Palace, which marked the first of its kind, forty four years after the two countries established relations.

From 25 to 27 November 2019, State Counsellor Aung San Suu Kyi visited Busan to attend the ASEAN-ROK Commemorative Summit and 1st Mekong-ROK Summit and delivered keynote speeches at the ASEAN-ROK Culture Innovation Summit and the ASEAN-ROK CEO Summit. She also held a bilateral meeting with President Moon where they signed 4 MOUs on cooperation on fisheries; technical and vocational training; the environment; and development of digital economy, higher education, smart cities and connectivity.

In November 2020, the year which marked the 45th anniversary of the two countries' bilateral relations, South Korean deputy foreign minister Kim Gunn visited Myanmar and showed South Korea's expectations for closer ties with Myanmar in the second term of Aung San Suu Kyi's NLD government.

=== After 2021 Myanmar coup d'état ===
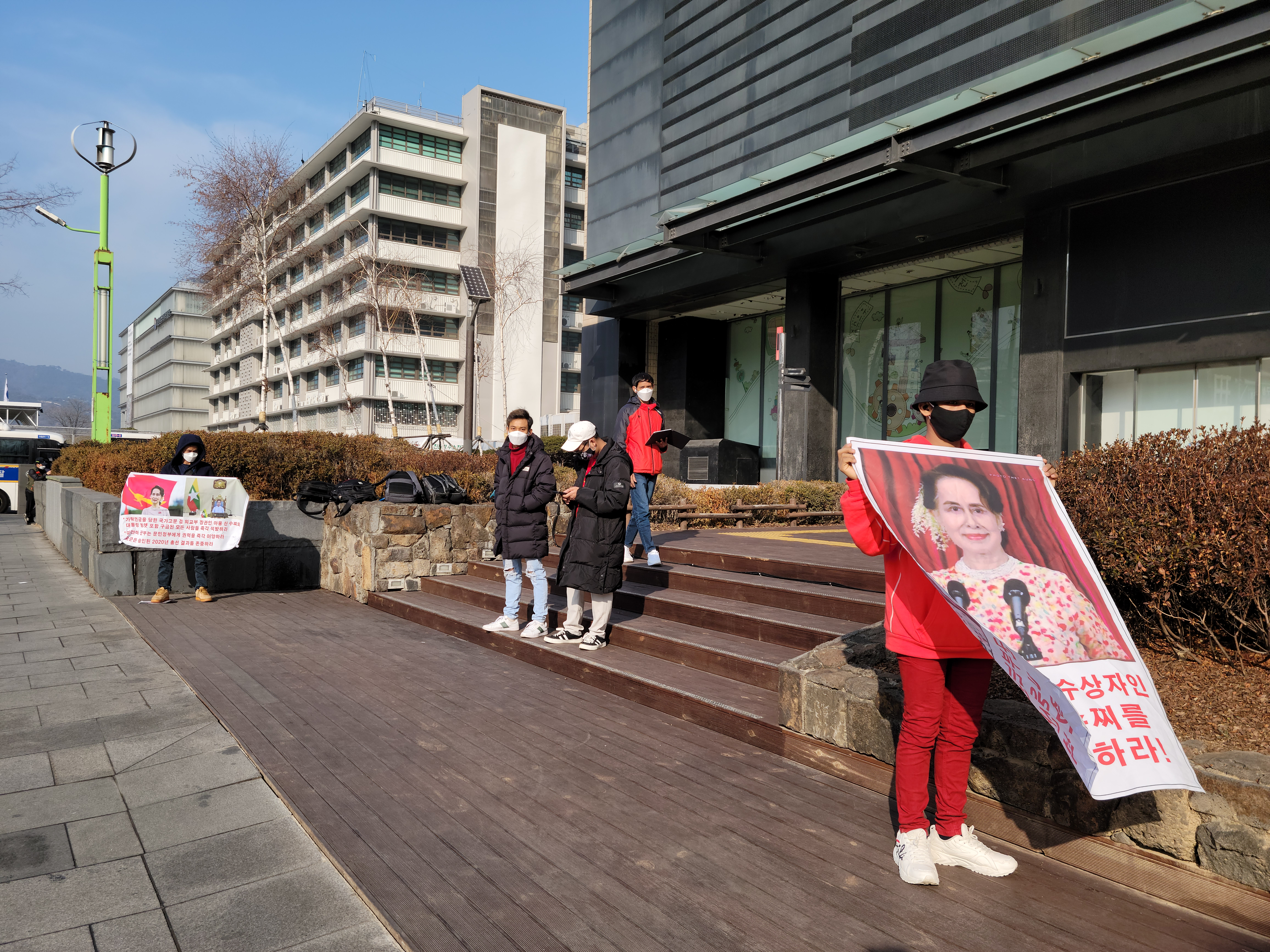
A coup protest, in line with COVID restrictions, in Seoul

In response to the February coup in Myanmar, on 26 February 2021, the South Korean National Assembly passed a resolution condemning the coup. Since February 2021, the Myanmar community in South Korea has staged coup protests which were also joined by Korean citizens ranging from students to monks. In March, South Korea stopped military support of Myanmar, and considered limiting other forms of assistance. Citizens of Myanmar in South Korea were granted exemptions which allowed them to extend their visits.

On 26 August, Cheongwadae issued a statement saying, "The [South Korean] government will continue to make contributions, going forward, so that the Myanmar situation can be resolved in a direction to meet the aspirations of its people." On the 66th Memorial Day on 6 June, President Moon delivered a speech predicting that "Spring in Myanmar" would surely come, like the Gwangju Uprising made way for democracy in South Korea.

On 2 September, when the National Unity Government of Myanmar established a representative office – appointing Yan Naing Htun as representative – in Seoul, South Korea became the first country in Asia to host such an office.

== Cultural exchange ==
During her state visit to Busan in November 2019, a commitment was made to train Project K, Myanmar's only K-pop style boy band, in South Korea by State Counsellor Aung San Suu Kyi, who considered herself a fan of the group. In September 2020, the band traveled to South Korea to be trained for a month in the lead-up to performing at the Asia Song Festival, held in October 2020 in Gyeongju. In December 2020, South Korea's Ministry of Culture, Sports and Tourism requested 1.5 billion won in funding to support the K-pop training of Asian artists, citing Project K. The National Assembly ultimately approved 400 million won to fund the program.

Starring Ryu Sang-wook and Wutt Hmone Shwe Yi as main leads, A Flower Above the Clouds (2019) was the first Korean-Myanmar joint film; the film was mentioned in President Moon's remarks at the state dinner in Naypyidaw.

On 9 October 2020, the Korean Embassy in Yangon and the Ministry of Religious Affairs and Culture of Myanmar put on a joint cultural performance, which was aired on MRTV, in commemoration of 45th anniversary of the two countries' bilateral relations.

== See also ==
- Foreign relations of Myanmar
- Foreign relations of South Korea
