= Khin Ma Ma Maw =

- ခင်မမမော်

First Lady of State of Burma
- In role 17 May 1942 – 27 March 1945
- Head of State: Ba Maw
- Preceded by: Position established
- Succeeded by: Position abolished

1st Nanyinwun Kadaw of British Burma
- In Role; 1937–1939
- Premier: Ba Maw
- Preceded by: Position established
- Succeeded by: ?

Personal details
- Born: Khin Ma Ma Maw; 13 December 1905 Rangoon, British Burma
- Died: 1967 (aged 61–62) Rangoon, Burma
- Spouse: Ba Maw
- Children: 7 including: Banya Maw and Tinsa Maw
- Occupation: Politician

Khin Ma Ma Maw (Burmese: ခင်မမမော်; 13 December 1905 – 1967), also known as Consort Maw (Burmese: ကြင်ယာတော်မော်), was the first nanyinwun kadaw (Note: The Nanyinwun Kadaw simply refers to the wife of the premier or prime minister.) of British Burma, as the wife of Premier Ba Maw. Ba Maw being inaugurated as the Naingandaw Adhipati (lit. 'paramount ruler of the State') of the State of Burma, Maw served as the first lady of the State of Burma from 17 May 1942 to 27 March 1945.

== Biography ==
Maw was born on 13 December 1905, to middle-class parents, and married Ba Maw on 5 April 1926. She became the first nanyinwun kadaw when her husband became the Premier of British Crown Colony of Burma. When Japan succeeded in occupying most of Burma, she plotting her husband to escaped from the prison, who was detained for high treason in Mogok Prison by the British government in 1940. Because of her efforts, he released in June 1942.

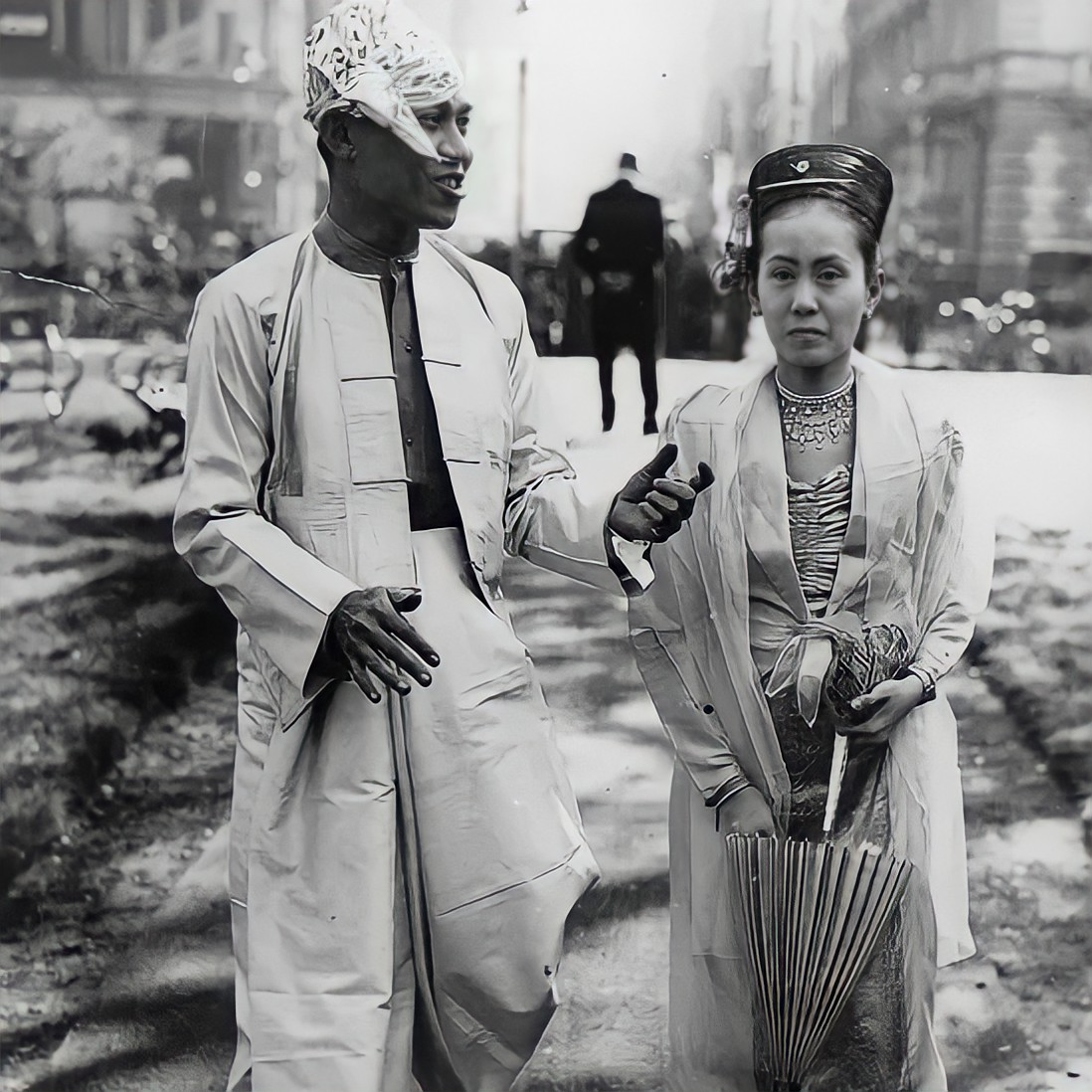
Premier Ba Maw and Consort Maw at the Coronation of George VI in 1937

When Ba Maw was proclaimed the naingandaw adhipadi (head of state) during the Japanese occupation in Burma, she became the first lady and was known as Consort Maw. Thereafter she started to practice some of royal court system in her mansion. On January 12, 1943, she established a volunteer organization. The volunteers helped clear rubble from the streets and worked in the hospitals.

Ba Maw allowed her to be involved in appointing some government positions; Ba Maw made decisions on the political affairs taking her thoughts into consideration.

Edward Michael Law-Yone, a journalist and official, wrote in his article Dr. Ba Maw of Burma, after having an interview with Maw, that she, "destined to found virtually a dynasty, was a slim, dainty person with attributes complementing those of her husband."

When the Japanese lost the war, her family were forced to retreat to Indochina and Japan. In the post-war period, some Maws were arrested. She died in 1967 at the age of 62.

== See also ==
- List of premiers of British Burma
- Ngahtaung-ser Kadaw
