= Spouse of the prime minister of Myanmar =

Title in Myanmar

Spouse of Prime Minister of Myanmar of Myanmar
- Current; San San Aye since 31 July 2025
- Style: Her Excellency
- Formation: 4 January 1948

Spouse of the Prime Minister of the Republic of the Union of Myanmar is the title held by the wife of the Prime Minister.

The current wife of Nyo Saw, who assumed the role on 31 July 2025, is San San Aye.

== History ==
In post-independence Burma, the presidential system is in place, but the real power is the prime minister. U Nu, who succeeded General Aung San, ruled the country for more than a decade in 1962. Therefore, U Nu's wife, Mya Yi, is the first Spouse of the prime minister of Burma.

== List of Spouse of Prime Minister of Myanmar ==
| # | Name | Picture | Prime Minister | Take Office | Left office | Days |
|---|---|---|---|---|---|---|
| 1 | Mya Yi | | U Nu | 4 January 1948 | 12 June 1956 | 8 years, 160 days |
| 2 | Nu Nu Swe | | Ba Swe | 12 June 1956 | 1 March 1957 | 262 days |
| (1) | Mya Yi | | U Nu | 1 March 1957 | 29 October 1958 | 1 year, 242 days |
| 3 | Khin May Than | | Ne Win | 29 October 1958 | 4 April 1960 | 1 year, 158 days |
| (1) | Mya Yi | | U Nu | 4 April 1960 | 2 March 1962 | 1 year, 332 days |
| (3) | Khin May Than | | Ne Win | 2 March 1962 | 30 September 1972 | 10 years, 212 days |
| 4 | Ni Ni Myint | | Ne Win | 3 April 1973 | 4 March 1974 | 335 days |
| 5 | Mya Shwe | | Sein Win | 4 March 1974 | 29 March 1977 | 3 years, 25 days |
| 6 | Khin Khin Lay | | Maung Maung Kha | 29 March 1977 | 26 July 1988 | 11 years, 119 days |
| 7 | N/A | | Tun Tin | 26 July 1988 | 18 September 1988 | 54 days |
| 8 | Aye Yee | | Saw Maung | 18 September 1988 | 23 April 1992 | 3 years, 218 days |
| 9 | Kyaing Kyaing | | Than Shwe | 23 April 1992 | 25 August 2003 | 11 years, 124 days |
| 10 | Khin Win Shwe | | Khin Nyunt | 25 August 2003 | 18 October 2004 | 1 year, 54 days |
| 11 | Than Than Nwe | | Soe Win | 19 October 2004 | 12 October 2007 | 2 years, 358 days |
| 12 | Khin Khin Win | | Thein Sein | 12 October 2007 | 30 March 2011 | 3 years, 169 days |
| 13 | Kyu Kyu Hla | | Min Aung Hlaing | 1 August 2021 | 31 July 2025 | 5 years, 38 days |
| 14 | San San Aye | | Nyo Saw | 31 July 2025 | Current | 1 year, 39 days |
