= Ngapali Beach =

Beach in Rakhine State, Myanmar

Ngapali Beach ငပလီကမ်းခြေ
- Beach
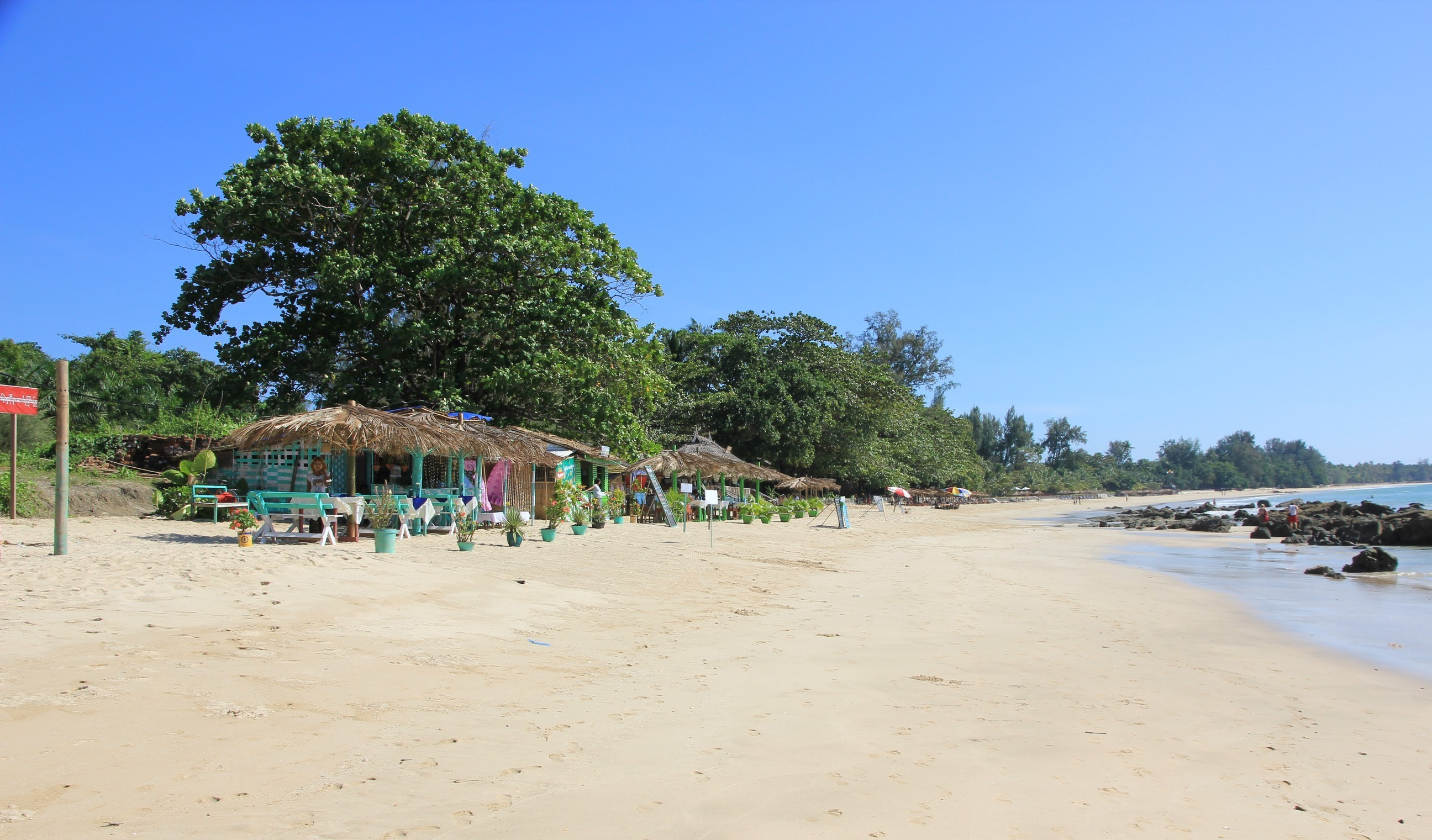
- View of the beach

- Location within Myanmar
- Coordinates: 18°26′00″N 94°19′00″E
- Location: Rakhine State, Myanmar
- Water bodies: Bay of Bengal

Ngapali Beach (Burmese: ငပလီကမ်းခြေ) is a coastal beach located in Rakhine State, western Myanmar, approximately 7 kilometers (4 miles) from the town of Thandwe. It is considered Myanmar’s premier beach destination. Ngapali Beach spans approximately 3 to 7 kilometers which stretches along the Bay of Bengal. The beach’s name, pronounced “Na-pal-li,” is said to derive from “Napoli” (Naples, Italy), attributed to an Italian traveler nostalgic for his homeland.

The beach came under the control of Arakan Army on June 24, 2024 during their Rakhine offensive in the ongoing Myanmar civil war.

== Geography ==
The beach is situated on the Bay of Bengal in southern Rakhine State, approximately 240 kilometers southwest of Nay Pyi Taw, Myanmar’s capital. It has an elevation of about 11 meters above sea level. The coastline features soft, white sand fringed by coconut palms with clear turquoise waters that are generally calm and free of dangerous marine life, making it ideal for swimming. The beach is part of a series of bays, with the main stretch extending between Ngapali village and the fishing village of Gyeik Taw (Jate Taw) to the south. Nearby, smaller bays like Andrew Bay and areas near Pearl Island offer additional scenic spots.

The region experiences a tropical monsoon climate, with average temperatures around 23°C, peaking at 28°C in March and dropping to 11°C in August. Annual rainfall averages 4,309 millimeters, with the wettest month being August (1,127 mm) and the driest January (1 mm).

The surrounding area includes mangrove forests, small islands, and hilly terrain, with spurs of the Arakan Mountains reaching the coast.

== Tourism ==
Ngapali Beach is Myanmar’s most developed beach destination, though it remains less commercialized than other regional counterparts. The tourism industry is primarily of international visitors with high-end resorts such as Bayview Ngapali, Amata Resort, Amazing Ngapali and the government-owned Anawa. These resorts offer amenities like beachfront views, spas and fine dining with room rates ranging from $100 to $250 per night which is significantly higher than elsewhere in Myanmar.

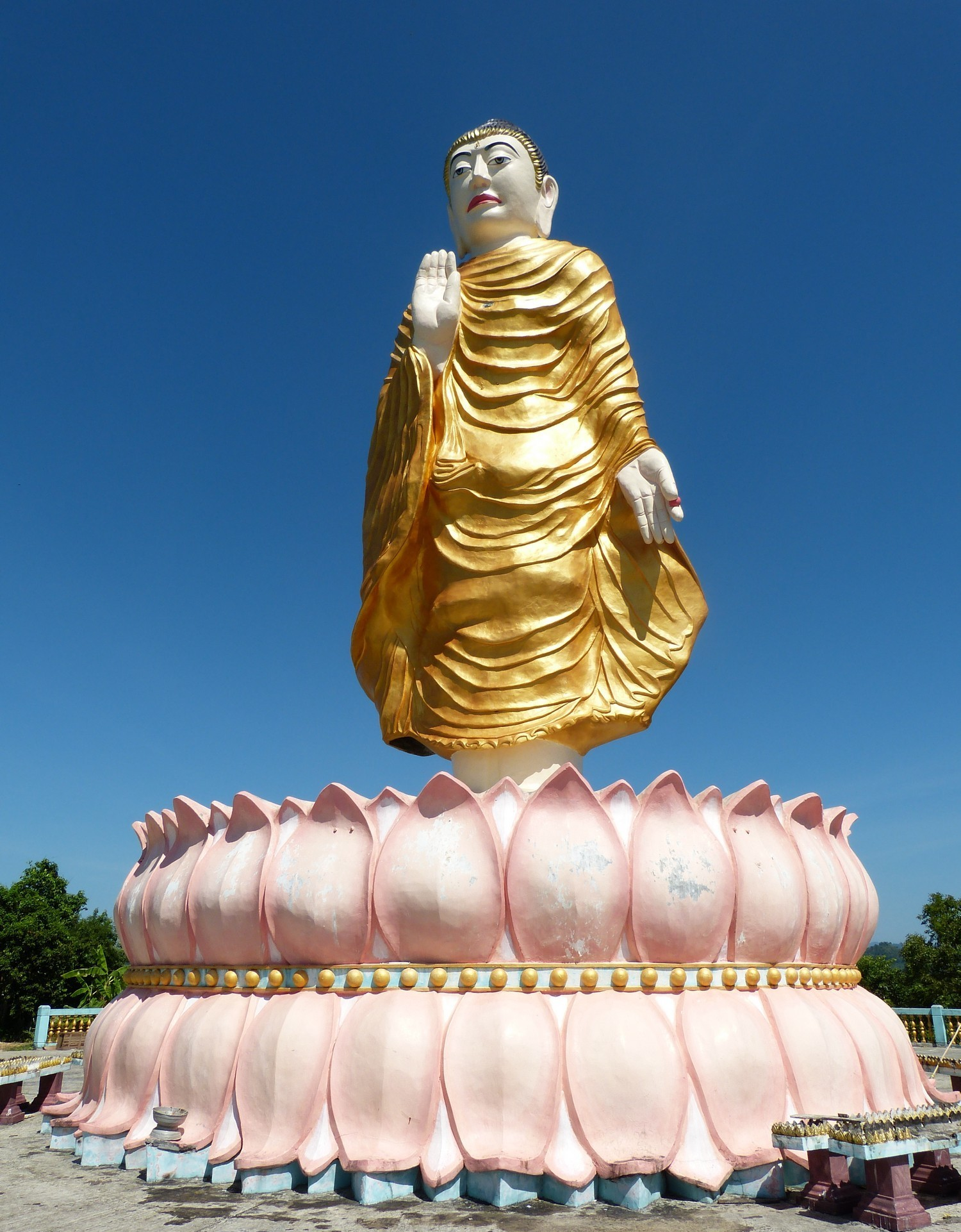
Statue of Buddha above Ngapali Beach

== Economy ==
The local economy benefits from tourism, providing income for nearby villages and Thadwe. Seasonal employment is common, with high unemployment during the monsoon season when tourism declines. Fishing remains a vital economic activity, with villages like Gyeik Taw supplying fresh seafood to beachfront restaurants. Local products like as dried fish, shrimp and coconut are transported to Yangon and other parts of Myanmar.

The region has seen billions of dollars invested in tourism infrastructure. As of the latest data, there are 65 hotels and over 2,000 rooms across the Thandwe-Ngapali area. Most are 4- to 5-star establishments located in neighborhoods like Linthar, Zee Phyu Kone, and Jettaw.

== Accessibility ==
Ngapali Beach is accessible primarily via Thandwe Airport (SNW), located 5 kilometers north of the beach. Domestic airlines, including Myanma Airways, Air Mandalay, and Air KBZ, operate flights from Yangon, Mandalay, and Bagan, though schedules are reduced during the monsoon season. The airport was closed in mid-2024 due to Arakan Army control. Overland travel is less common due to poor road conditions. Some hotels offer free Wi-Fi, but connectivity can be slow.

== Controversies and conflict ==
Hotels in the area are largely owned by individuals with military ties. Senior General Min Aung Hlaing has been a regular visitor to Ngapali with his wife Kyu Kyu Hla. The Myanmar military has held official events at local resorts, including a 2023 meeting with Thai military officials at the Jasmine Ngapali Resort.

In the early 2000s, Myanmar’s military confiscated over 100 acres of coastal land from residents in Thandwe, including areas around Ngapali Beach, Ziphyu Kone village, and Shwewachai Beach. The compensation offered to landowners was reportedly 7,000 kyats per acre. The land was later leased to military-linked companies and individuals, many of whom had close ties with senior military leaders or held positions in military-affiliated business networks.

Much of the land used for hotels was previously military-owned or confiscated from locals. Some was leased to companies at low rates. U Ba Shein, a former MP, raised this issue in parliament in 2013. Compensation was reportedly provided to some affected farmers, though not all accepted or received it.

The Arakan Army, which took control over the area in 2024, expressed intent to reevaluate land ownership based on local rights. The AA leader, General Twan Mrat Naing, has a background in tourism. The AA also stated it would stop collecting money from hoteliers under the name "AE".

== Gallery ==
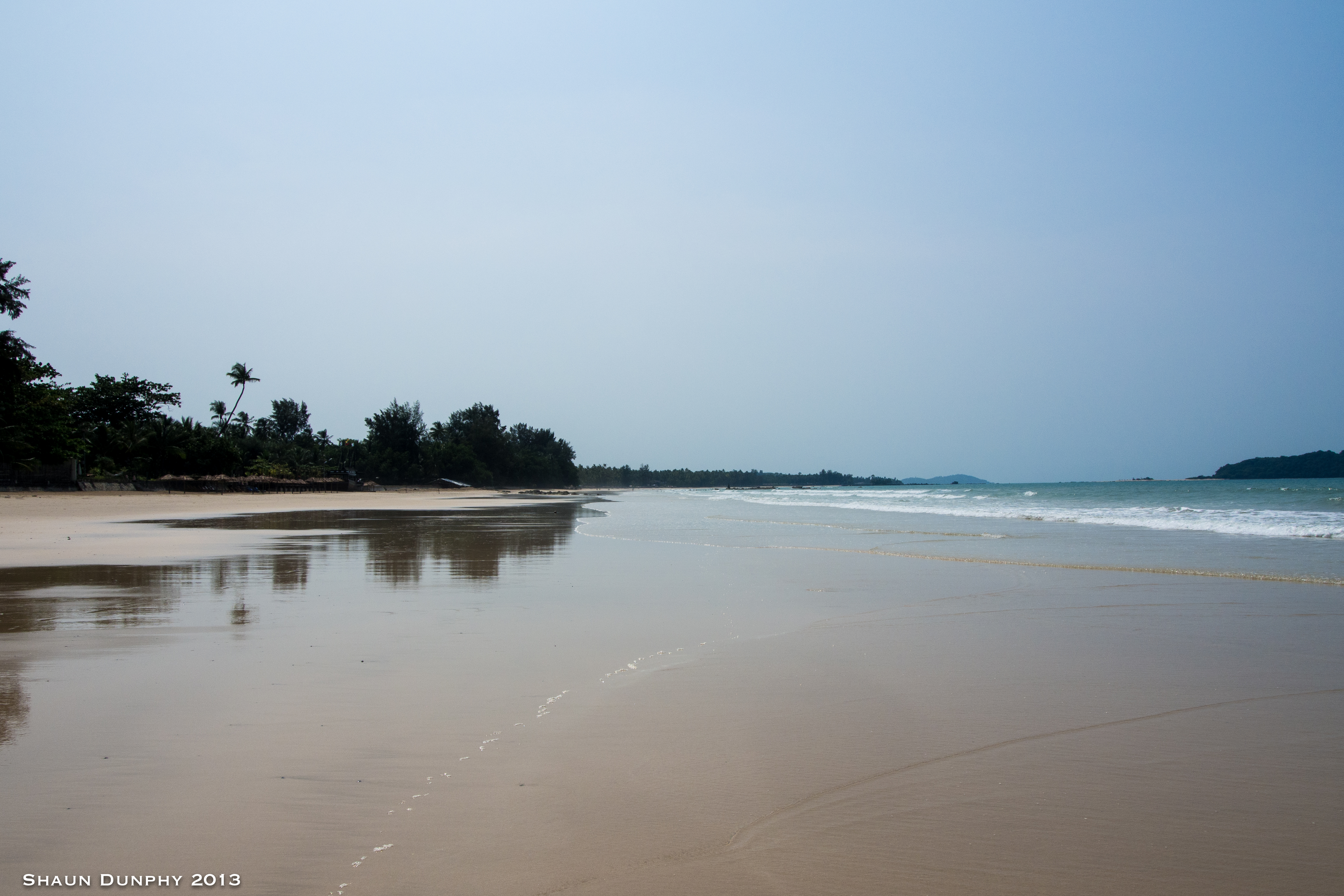

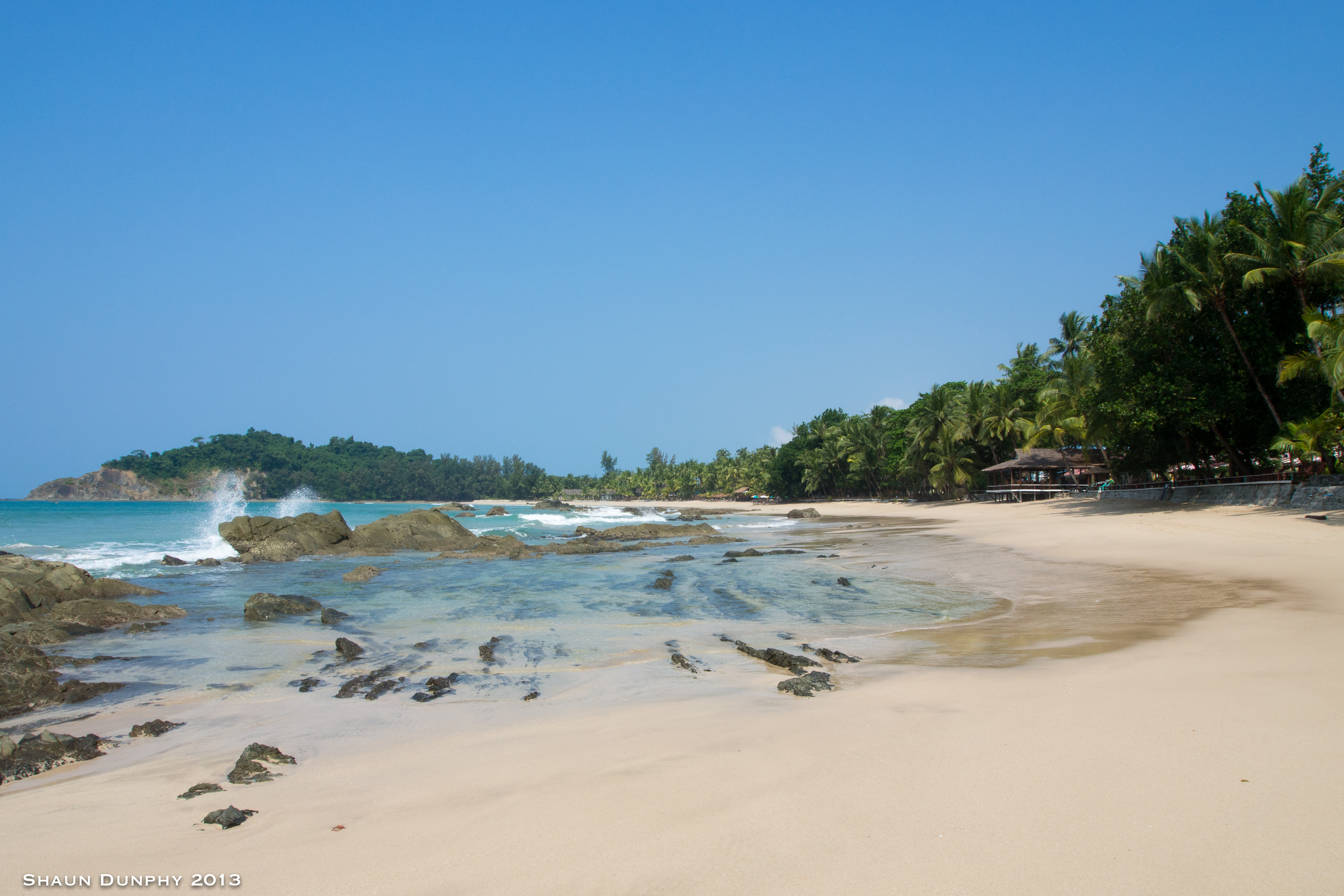

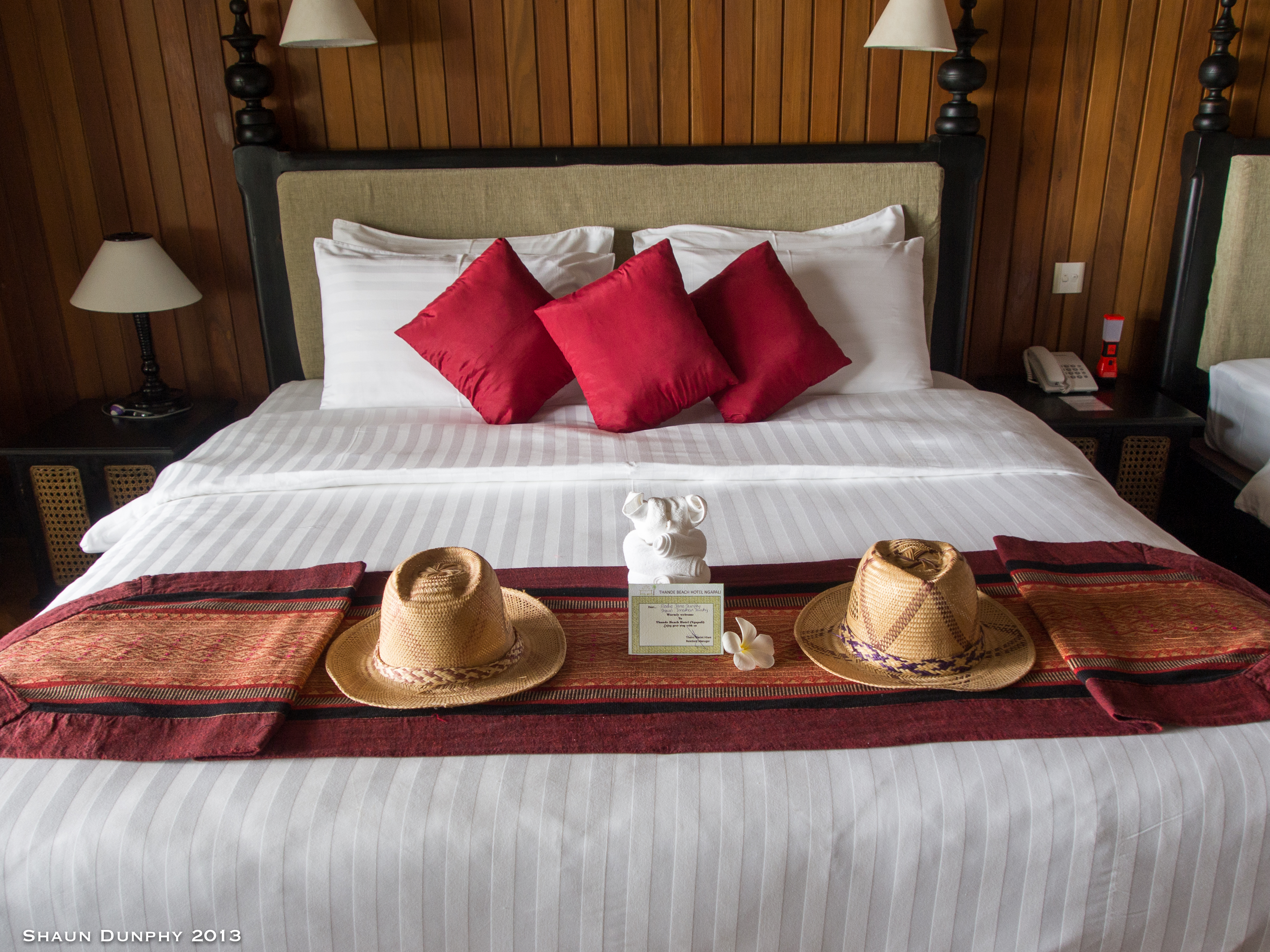

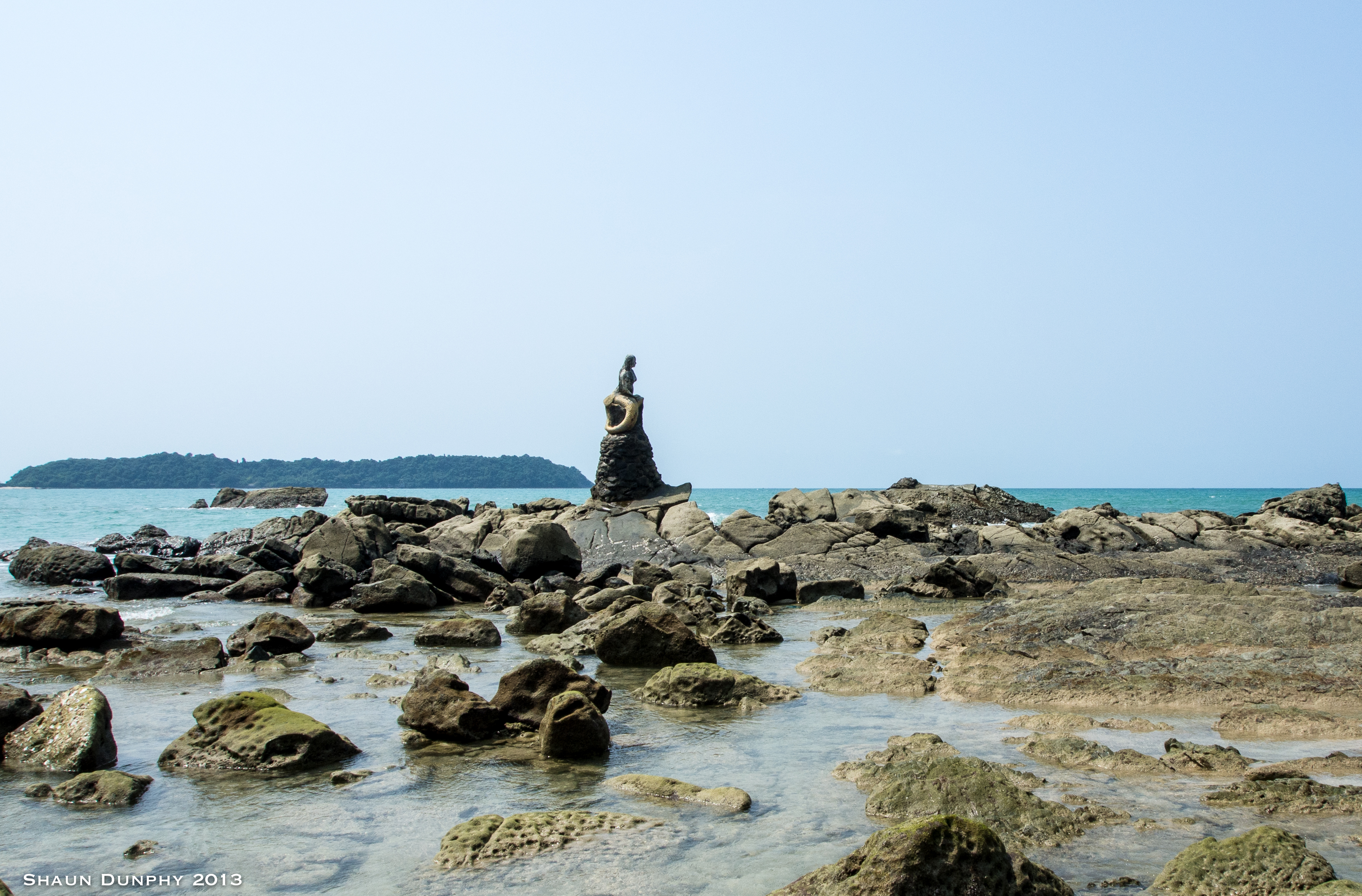

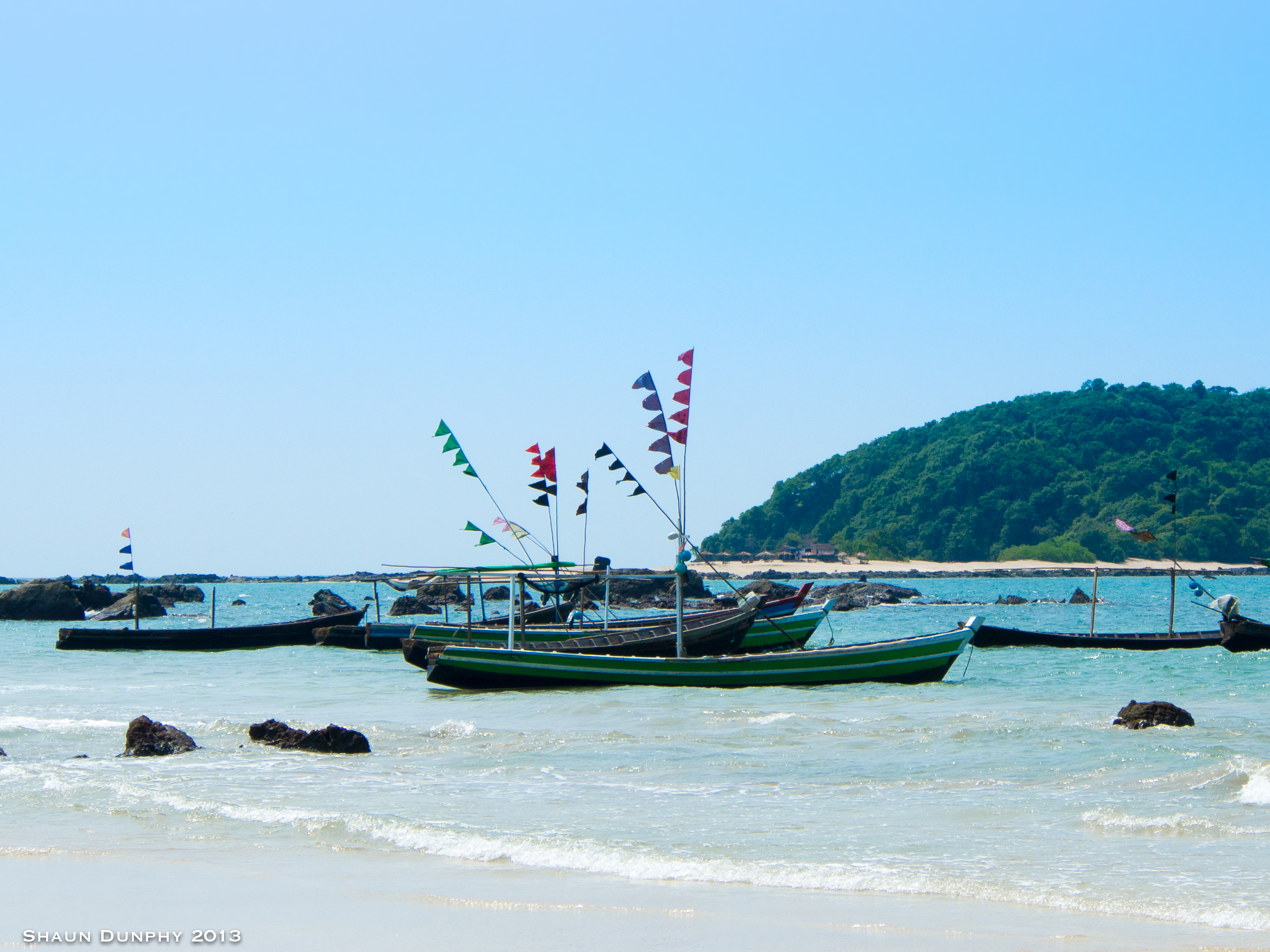

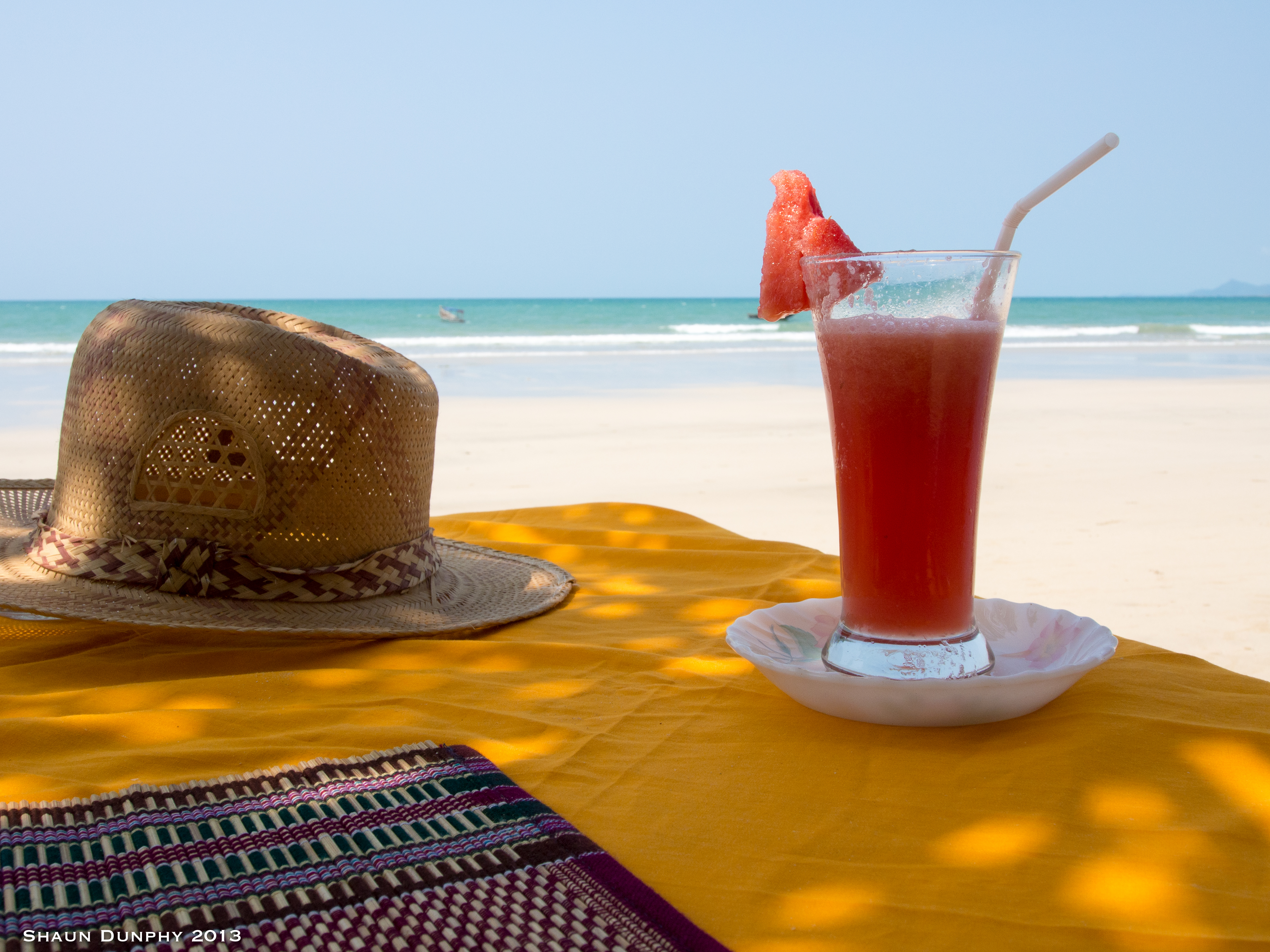

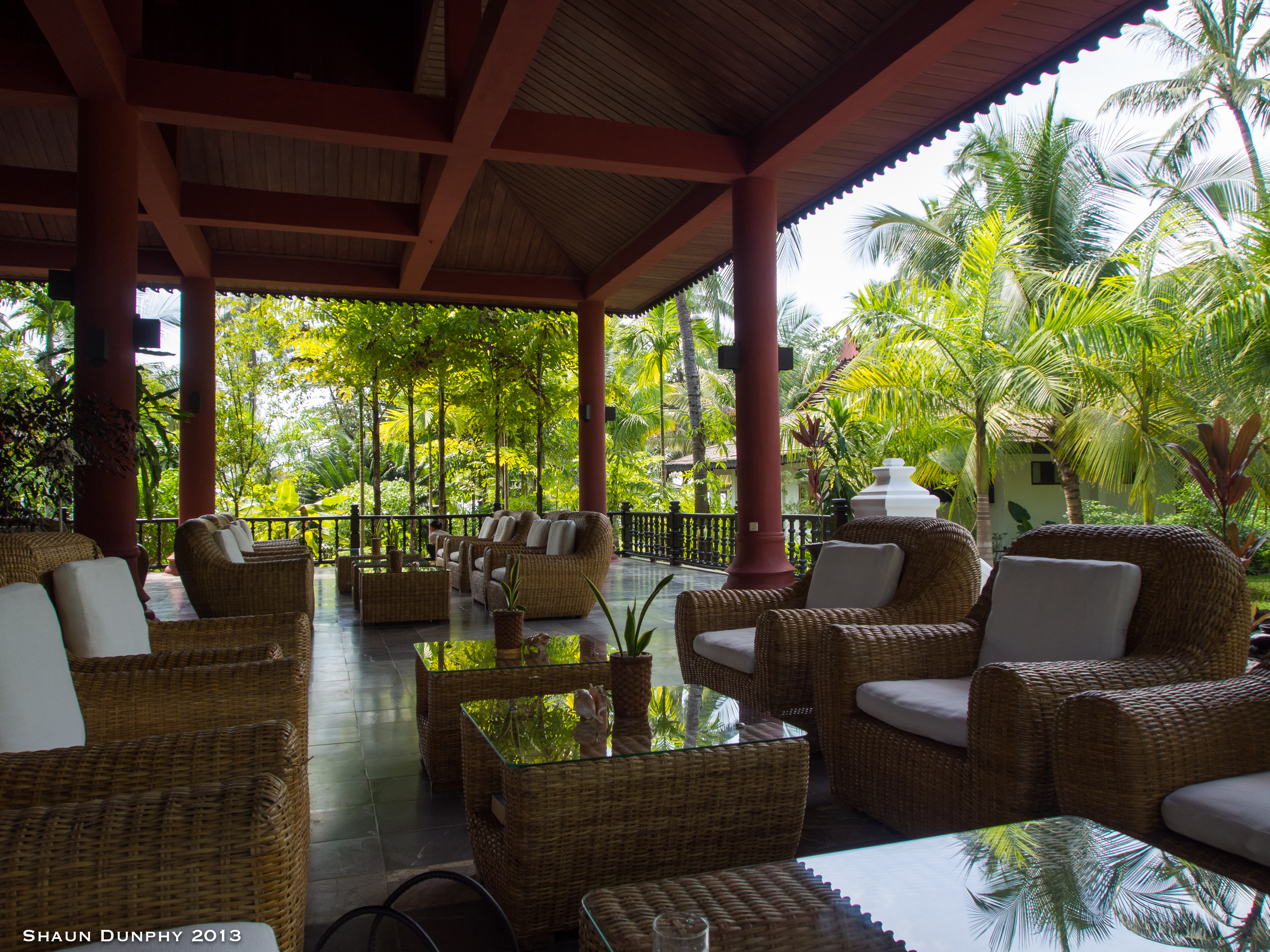

== See also ==
- Mrauk U
- Kanthaya Beach
- List of tourist attractions in Myanmar
