= Ngahtaung-ser Kadaw =

Wife of the Royal Chancellor in British Burma

Ngahtaung-ser Kadaw (ငါးထောင်စားကတော်) is the historical position of a wife to a senior member of the Governor's Executive Council, known as the Royal Chancellor (အမတ်ချုပ်) of British Burma.

== History ==
In the 1920s, the British set the diarchy system on Burma and created the position of Royal Chancellor. The British government also pays salary 5,000 kyat a month to the spouse of the Chancellor. The spouse of the Royal Chancellor was known as the Ngahtaung-ser Kadaw. They are also the top Burmese women in the colonial era, along with the wives of the high-ranking British officials. These women treated the title of Lady when the British King knighted their husbands with the title of Sir. The first title holder was Daw May, also known as Lady J. A Maung Gyi, who was the wife of Joseph Augustus Maung Gyi. Later the position of Ngahtaung-ser Kadaw was succeeded by Nanyinwun Kadaw (နန်းရင်းဝန်ကတော်, lit; 'the wife of the Premier of British Burma') in the 1930s.

== See also ==
- Spouse of the prime minister of Myanmar
- First Lady of Myanmar
