= Maung Maung Tin (prince) =

Burmese prince and historican

H.R.H. Prince Maung Maung Tin
- ‌မောင်မောင်တင်
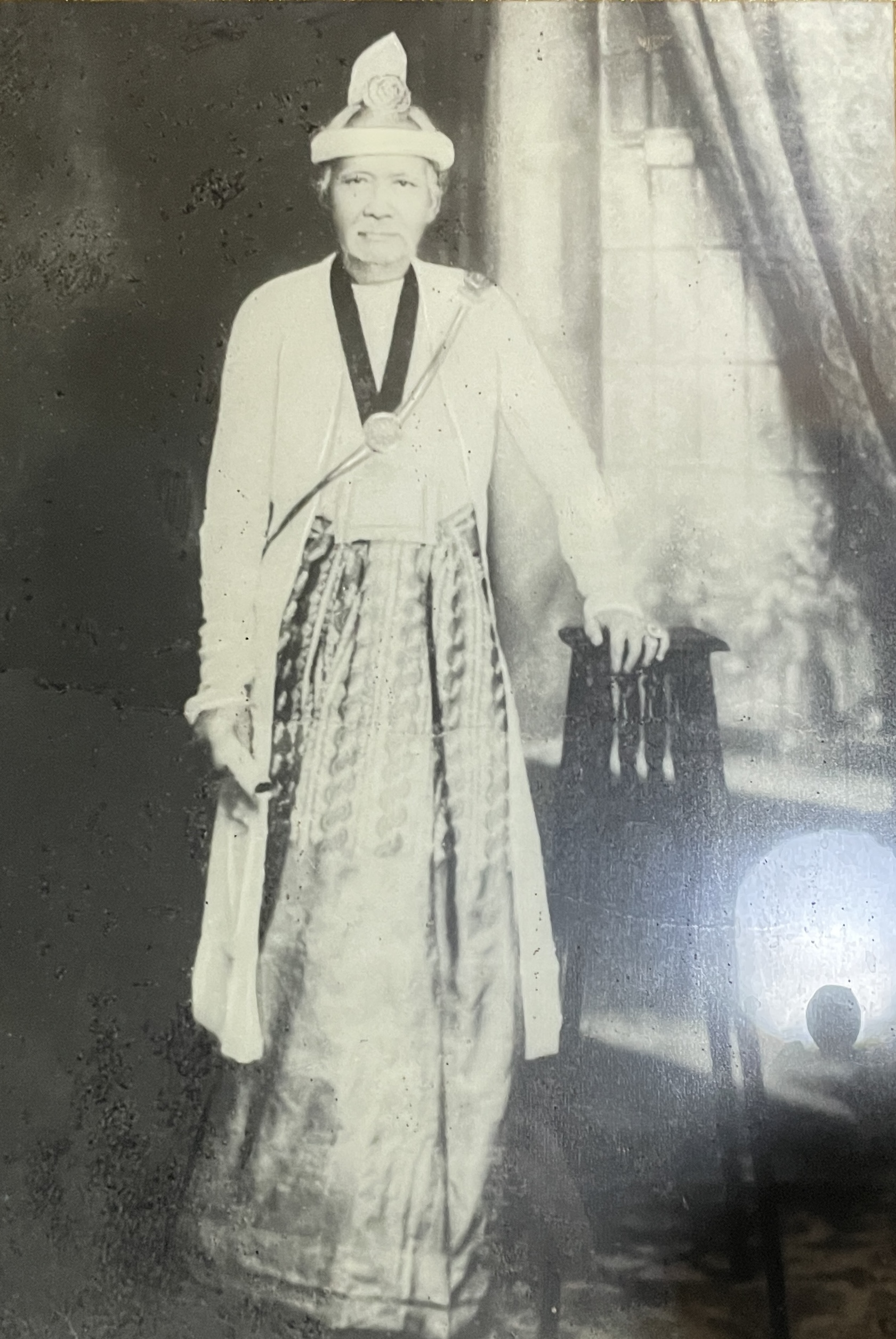
- A photograph of U Maung Maung Tin in traditional Burmese court attire wearing the K.S.M salwe

Personal details
- Born: 20 August 1866 Mandalay, Konbaung Burma
- Died: 23 March 1945 (aged 78–79) Taunggyi, Federated Shan States, British Burma
- Spouse: Hteik Tin Sint
- Relations: Tin Tin Hla (granddaughter) Su Su Lwin (great-granddaughter) Shine Lin Zay Yar (great-great grandson)
- Awards: Good Service Medal (Burmese: အမှုထမ်းကောင်း ရွှေတံဆိပ်ရမင်း) (A.T.M); K.S.M (ကျက်သရေဆောင် ရွှေစလွယ်ရမင်း)

Maung Maung Tin (Burmese: မောင်မောင်တင်; 20 August 1866—23 March 1945), also known as Mandalay U Tin, was a prince of the Konbaung dynasty, courtier, resistance leader, British colonial civil servant, writer, and historian. He is best known as the author of the last royal chronicle of Burma—the Konbaung Set Yazawin.

== Royal ancestry ==
While he did not bear any official royal title, or at least one that has not been passed down through historical records, Maung Maung Tin was often referred to as Hteik Tin Maung Maung Tin (Burmese: ထိပ်တင်မောင်မောင်တင်), with "Hteik Tin" having served as a kind of honorific, similar to "Min," an honorific which was reserved for royals prior to its casualisation.

Maung Maung Tin was of both Burmese and Thai (Yodiyan) royal blood. Through his father, He was a great-great-grandson of Hsinbyushin and, therefore, one of Alaungpaya's great-great-great-grandsons—the founder of the Konbaung dynasty, Burma's last royal house. Through his mother, he was a grandson of the penultimate Yodiyan king Uthumphon. Ironically, his mother was part of the cadre of Yodiyan royals relocated to areas around the ancient Burmese capital city of Inwa by Hsinbyushin following the fall of Ayutthaya during the Burmese–Siamese wars of the late 18th century.

Maung Maung Tin's ancestral connection to these two widely eulogized kings of Burma can be traced fairly well. Sometime during the late 18th century, the Princess of Tantabin Thiri Pabadewi (Burmese: သီရိပဘာဒေဝီ), a daughter of Hsinbyushin, was wedded to the Prince of Wuntho Minye Myatswa (Burmese: မင်းရဲမြတ်စွာ). They would later produce a son whose date of birth is not known. During the latter half of the 19th century, this son of theirs, Prince of Myinmu Minye Thiha Kyaw (Burmese: မြင်းမူမင်သာ မင်းရဲသီဟကျော်), went on to wed the Ayutthayan princess Kyauk Phwa Saw. It was to this royal couple, in 1866, that Maung Maung Tin was born. He had an older sister Princess Kyundaung.

== Early life and education ==
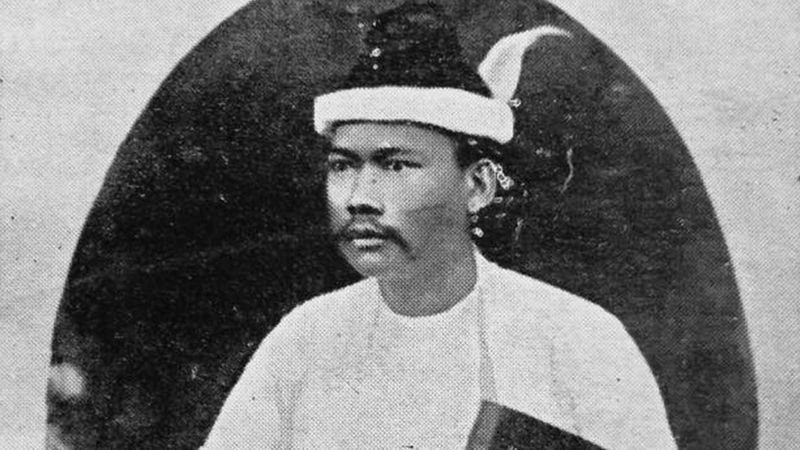
A portrait of young Hteik Tin Maung Maung Tin

Maung Maung Tin was born to the Myinmu prince Minye Thiha Kyaw and Ayutthaya princess Kyauk Phwa Saw (Burmese: ကျောက်ဖွားစော) under the reign of then king of Burma Mindon Min in Burma's former capital city of Mandalay on the 20th of August, 1866—a Monday—8 AM.

In 1876, at the age of 10, he novitiated at the Shwe Kyin Monastery, a monastery situated nearby the capital at the foot of Mandalay Hill, alongside some of Mindon Min's sons. He would spend the next 5 years at this monastery pursuing an education in Burmese literature until the age of 15. He then pursued an education in English at the court school of Dr. J.E. Mark (Brother Mark) alongside some of Thibaw Min's close family members, which was a renowned institution that was dedicated to providing an English education to Burmese princes and princesses.

During his time at the court school, the young prince's exceptional academic abilities were recognized. He eventually earned a scholarship and stipend of fifteen kyats from His Majesty the King's Treasury. At the age of fifteen, Maung Maung Tin, accompanied by his father the Myinmu Prince, was summoned to serve at the royal court of King Thibaw.

== Aftermath of the Third Anglo-Burmese War ==
After Burma's defeat in the Third and last Anglo-Burmese War ever and Thibaw Min's resultant capture and exile to India in 1885, many Burmese irrespective of ethnicity took up arms to put up a fierce resistance against the English for a total of 5 years. Since the British army virtually bypassed the entirety of the Royal Burmese Armed Forces during the war, many Burmese soldiers who were on active duty remained unscathed, later on proving to be a formidable force even following the loss of independence.

Though he was just 19 years old at the time, Maung Maung Tin partook in these resistance efforts and, by virtue of the fact that he was a prince, led a group of them. While the British had put out a notice that anyone who might willingly gave up their arms would be welcomed, Maung Maung Tin and many others never heeded the call. Eventually, the British released a potential award of 3000 kyats for whoever could capture Maung Maung Tin and bring him alive to the authorities. After a year of fighting, it came to Maung Maung Tin's knowledge that some members of his rebel group were planning to betray and trade him in for the substantial reward. He was forced back to Mandalay, giving up his arms.

In 1891, he was endowed upon by the British a leading administrative role in the town of Pinlebu, Sagaing Region, an endowment which would eventually evolve into a career in the civil service.

His younger sister the princess Kyundaung was a member of the group of retainers who were exiled to India along with Thibaw Min.

== Civil servant ==
In 1891, Maung Maung Tin was given chief administrative roles in the Sagaing town of Kawlin and Pinlebu, thus earning him the name Kawlin Mintha, or prince of Kawlin. 15 years later, in 1906, he was brought up to the provincial level and promoted to an Extra Assistant Commissioner (E.A.C.). While serving, he was awarded the Good Service Medal (Burmese: အမှုထမ်းကောင်း ရွှေတံဆိပ်ရမင်း). He lived in the town of Myittha during the first few years of this tour of duty before moving to Ye-U town. It is in this town that he would be awarded once more. This time with the K.S.M (Burmese: ကျက်သရေဆောင် ရွှေစလွယ်ရမင်း), roughly translated to "Medal of Honour" in English, in 1912.

In 1917, he was reassigned to Monywa District. He would live in the town of Monywa for the next 4 years.

After 30 years of service in the British colonial administration of Burma, U Maung Maung Tin withdrew from public service in 1922 and retired.

However, in 1925, Sir Harcourt Butler, then Governor of Burma, appointed U Maung Maung Tin as the Mahadunwun, roughly equivalent to a Minister of Religious Affairs, which was an office charged with overseeing the monastic order's adherence to the Vinaya. With great dedication, Maung Maung Tin discharged his duties as the Mahadunwun from 1925 up until 1940.

== Historian ==
Besides being a writer and government official, Maung Maung Tin was also a historian. It is not known, however, why he developed an interest in history, but based on the many activities he conducted throughout his life, it can be concluded that Maung Maung Tin, following his country's loss of independence, felt a great need to safeguard and preserve Burmese history, culture, and religion for future generations.

Maung Maung Tin collected items related to Burmese civilization. Over several decades, he gathered cultural artifacts and antiques, including ancient Theravada Buddhist scriptures and canonical gold inscriptions on white parapaik (palm leaf manuscripts). He continued this activity until the Second World War. The collection, stored in his Mandalay home, consisted of over 4,000 palace manuscripts, including records, drawings, and plays, before it was destroyed by fire by retreating KMT Chinese forces in 1942 during the Japanese invasion of Burma.

This interest of his eventually compelled him towards a stint as a college professor. After briefly stepping down from the civil service in 1921, Maung Maung Tin volunteered as a professor to teach students of the Mandalay College history twice a week, which he did so in the hopes that the knowledge he imparted would benefit future generations.

== Konbaung Set Yazawin ==
Maung Maung Tin is the author of the last royal chronicle of Burma, the Konbaung Set Yazawin (Burmese: ကုန်းဘောင်ဆက် ရာဇဝင်တော်ကြီး). The chronicle covers the entire history of the Konbaung dynasty through a synthesis of the parts of the two previous chronicles—the Hmannan Yazawin and Dutiya Yazawin—which focus on the relevant royal house, historical records, notes from interviews of former courtiers, and U Maung Maung Tin's own writing.

== Death ==
While on a visit to Thailand in April 1945, Maung Maung Tin fell ill and, shortly after, died on 23 March from dysentery in the town of Taunggyi, Shan state.

== Family ==
Maung Maung Tin had 13 children in total with Hteik Tin Sint, whom he married in 1892. Hteik Tin Sint was a descendant of Tharrawaddy Min, who was also descended from Alaungpaya, thus making their marriage actually one between distant cousins.

His children are listed here in descending order: Hla Tin, Tin Tin Kyi, Tin Tin, Tin Tin Aye, Tin Tin Nwe, Saw Tin, Tin Tin Phyu, Tin Tin Let, Tin Tin May, Tin Tin Shwe, Tin Tin Nu, Tin Tin Su, and Tin Maung Maung Lay.

His great-granddaughter Su Su Lwin is a politician and former First Lady of Myanmar who married Htin Kyaw, the ninth president of Myanmar.
