= Pearl Island, Ngapali =

Island in Ngapali Beach, Rakhine State

Pearl Island ပုလဲကျွန်း
- Island
- Location within Myanmar
- Coordinates: 18°22′32″N 94°19′16″E
- Country: Myanmar
- State: Rakhine State

Pearl Island (Burmese: ပုလဲကျွန်း; also known as Apaw-Ye Kyun) is a small tropical island located off the coast of Ngapali Beach in Rakhine State, Myanmar. It is located more than a mile from Ngapali Beach and covers an area of 108 acres.

The island is known for its scenic coastline, forests, hills, and natural beauty which has potential to become a world-class eco-tourism destination. It is home to rare wildlife, sea turtles, and century-old trees.

In March 2018, the Rakhine State government began constructing a ring road on the island to boost tourism. In February 2020, a decomposing 40-45 foot whale drifted ashore and became trapped among rocks near the island.
