= Kyaing Kyaing =

Her Excellency Kyaing Kyaing
- ကြိုင်ကြိုင်
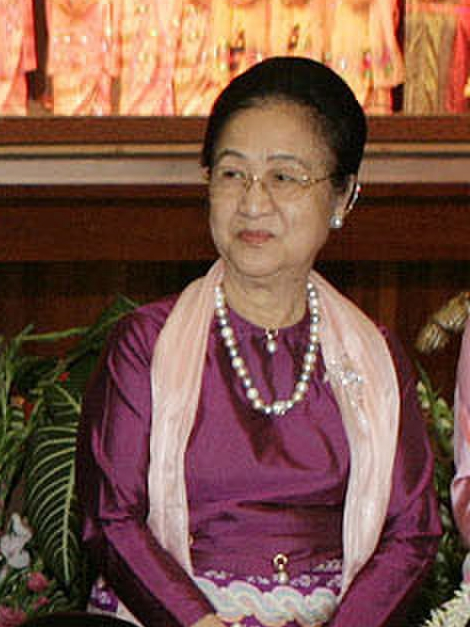
- Kyaing Kyaing in 2006

First Lady of Myanmar
- In role 1992–2011
- Appointed by: Chairman of State Peace and Development Council
- Prime Minister: Than Shwe; Khin Nyunt; Soe Win; Thein Sein
- Preceded by: Aye Yee
- Succeeded by: Khin Khin Win

Spouse of Commander-in-Chief of the Armed Forces of Myanmar
- Appointed by: Commander-in-Chief of the Armed Forces of Myanmar
- Preceded by: Aye Yee
- Succeeded by: Kyu Kyu Hla

Parton of Myanmar Women Affairs
- Succeeded by: Khin Khin Win

Personal details
- Born: Ma Kyan Kaw Kyaik, Burma
- Spouse: Than Shwe
- Relations: Nay Shwe Thway Aung (grandson)
- Children: 8
- Parent(s): Kyu Tin (father); Phwar May (mother)

Kyaing Kyaing (Burmese: ကြိုင်ကြိုင်; pronounced [kjɪŋ kjɪŋ]) is a public figure in Myanmar, known for her role as the former First Lady of Myanmar. She is married to former army general and prime minister of Myanmar, Than Shwe, who served as the head of state of Burma from 1992 to 2011 as Chairman of the State Peace and Development Council (SPDC). Kyaing Kyaing became the First Lady of Myanmar when her spouse assumed the role of Head of the State and Government. She is considered to be the most powerful woman in her time, often enjoyed great power that was derived from her husband's favor. Kyaing Kyaing was an honorary patron of the Myanmar Women's Affairs Federation.

== Early life and family ==
Kyaing Kyaing was born in Kaw Kyaik Township, Kayin State, Myanmar. She is of Pa-O descent. She is the fifth daughter of nine siblings. She was educated in Moulmein. They have five daughters, Aye Aye Thit Shwe, Dewa Shwe, Khin Pyone Shwe, Kyi Kyi Shwe, and Thandar Shwe, and three sons, Kyaing San Shwe, Thant Zaw Shwe and Htun Naing Shwe.

== Political influence ==
Kyaing Kyaing shares her husband's superstitious beliefs and has been known to act as a mystic medium. She exerts significant influence over Than Shwe's personal life, overseeing the preparation of his meals and controlling access to him. She also wields significant power in government and military appointments, as her approval is required before any appointment can be made. According to the Democratic Voice of Burma, Kyaing Kyaing's power to hire and fire individuals in government and military positions has resulted in her receiving significant rewards such as luxury homes in new housing developments and business concessions. The business community in Myanmar has claimed that as the Burmese New Year approached, Kyaing Kyaing demanded gifts worth at least 6 billion kyat ($5 million) from them. She displayed signs of delusions of grandeur, expecting people to address her as "your majesty" and to drop to their knees in her presence.

Kyaing Kyaing used a sentimental approach to prevent her husband, Than Shwe, from retiring from active political life. She appealed to his love for their favorite grandson, asking who else would take care of the grandson's future if Than Shwe retired. As a result, Than Shwe continued to hold on to power. Kyaing Kyaing is believed to have held a strong grudge against Aung San Suu Kyi, the leader of the National League for Democracy. Some suspect that she may have been involved in the violent attack against the pro-democracy activists and her supporters in May 2003. When a minister was arrested on charges related to a $10 million business scandal, over 30 unlicensed cars and a large amount of gold and jewelry were found during a raid on his home. Kyaing Kyaing reportedly requested that the confiscated goods be delivered to her by army associates, but Than Shwe intervened and countermanded her instruction.

On 2 March 2023, the military government awarded her the title of Agga Maha Thiri Thudhamma Theingi, one of the country's highest religious honors, for significantly contributing to the flowering and propagation of Buddhism.

== Yadaya rituals ==
Similar to many members of the ruling military, Kyaing Kyaing and her husband hold strong superstitious beliefs and often seek advice from astrologers and other individuals who claim to possess supernatural insights. Kyaing Kyaing and her husband are also known to practice yadaya, a form of voodoo believed to provide protection against misfortune. There have been reports suggesting that they may have attempted to use the rituals of yadaya in an occult manner to influence meetings with opposition leader Aung San Suu Kyi.

Kyaing Kyaing has been a fervent believer in nats, or spirits, astrology, and yadaya for many years. According to reports, in the 1980s, an astrologer who was also a monk predicted to Kyaing Kyaing that her husband would one day become the head of the government. The same astrologer also claimed that her husband had been a king in a past life. After the first prediction came true, Than Shwe reportedly developed an interest in astrology and yadaya. He began seeking advice from astrologers and soothsayers, including E Thi, one of Myanmar's most famous fortune-tellers.

Kyaing Kyaing visited the Shit Myet Hna Pagoda in Kyaukse, her husband's birthplace, to perform a yadaya ritual. The pagoda is known as the "Eight Faces" pagoda because it faces eight points of the compass. During her visit, Kyaing Kyaing reportedly prayed symbolically for support from all directions for her husband and his regime.

In 2009, Kyaing Kyaing donated and placed the diamond and jewel encrusted hti, the seinbudaw (diamond orb), and the hngetmyatnadaw (pennant-shaped vane), atop the uppermost part of the 2,300-year-old Danok Pagoda. Many people believed that the ceremony was a yadaya and seeking divine blessings for her husband's glory. However, the pagoda collapsed, killing at least 20 people and injuring about 150

Honorary titles
Preceded by Aye Yee	First Lady of Myanmar; 1992–2011	Succeeded by Khin Khin Win
