= Khin Khin Win =

Her Excellency Khin Khin Win
- ခင်ခင်ဝင်း
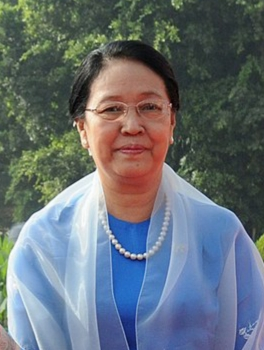
- Khin Khin Win in 2011

First Lady of Myanmar
- In role 30 March 2011 – 30 March 2016
- President: Thein Sein
- Preceded by: Kyaing Kyaing
- Succeeded by: Su Su Lwin

Spouse of Prime Minister of Myanmar
- Preceded by: Than Than Nwe
- Succeeded by: Kyu Kyu Hla

Patron of the Myanmar Women Affairs Association
- Preceded by: Kyaing Kyaing
- Succeeded by: Su Su Lwin

Personal details
- Spouse: Thein Sein
- Children: 3

Khin Khin Win (Burmese: ခင်ခင်ဝင်း [kʰɪ̀ɴ kʰɪ̀ɴ wɪ́ɴ]) is a former First Lady of Myanmar, and the wife of former President of Myanmar Thein Sein. She was Myanmar's First Lady from 30 March 2011 to 30 March 2016.

In December 2011, Khin Khin Win met U.S. Secretary of State Hillary Clinton during her official visit in Myanmar. On 30 January 2012, the Singapore Botanic Gardens named a new orchid hybrid, the Dendrobium Daw Khin Khin Win, in her honour.

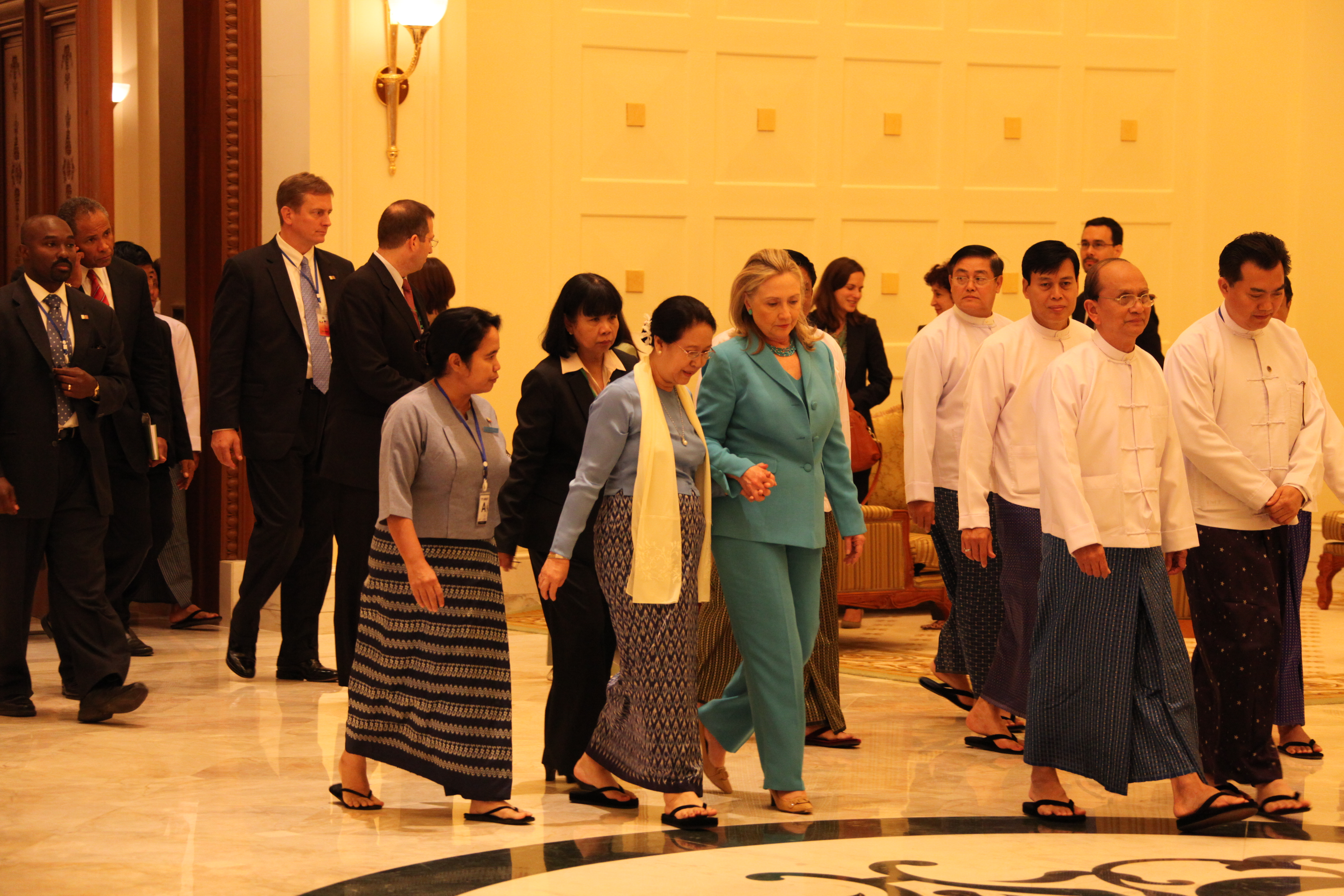
Thein Sein, Khin Khin Win and Hillary Clinton at Presidential Palace

On 2 March 2023, the military government awarded her the title of Agga Maha Thiri Thudhamma Theingi, one of the country’s highest religious honours, for significantly contributing to the flowering and propagation of Buddhism.

== Personal life ==
Khin Khin Win and Thein Sein have three children.

Honorary titles
Preceded by Kyaing Kyaing	First Lady of Myanmar; 2011–2016	Succeeded by Su Su Lwin
