= Kanthaya Beach =

Beach in Rakhine State, Myanmar

Kanthaya Beach ကမ်းသာယာကမ်းခြေ
- Beach
- Location within Myanmar
- Coordinates: 17°43′15″N 94°32′05″E
- Location: Rakhine State, Myanmar
- Water bodies: Bay of Bengal

Kanthaya Beach (Burmese: ကမ်းသာယာကမ်းခြေ) is a coastal beach located in Rakhine State, Myanmar. It is situated along the Bay of Bengal in the southern part of Rakhine near Thandwe and sits approximately 100 kilometers south of the Ngapali Beach. The beach has soft sands and is surrounded by lush greenery.

The beach was formerly known as the Thayar Kan Chei Recreation Centre, with both names originating from the nearby village of Thayar Gyaing. The word "Thayar" means pleasant, enjoyable or delightful.
