= Konbaung Set Yazawin =

Chronicle by Maung Maung Tin

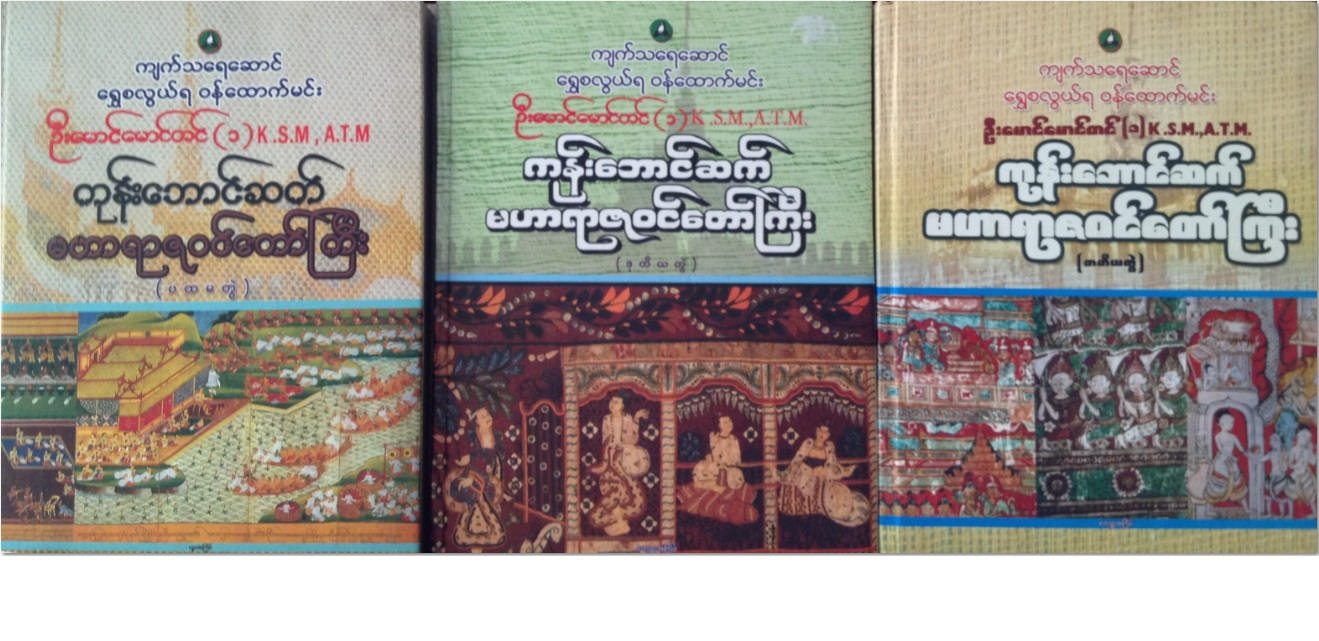
- "Konbaung Set" Chronicle
- Author: Maung Maung Tin
- Original title: ကုန်းဘောင်ဆက် မဟာ ရာဇဝင်တော်ကြီး Konbaung Set Maha Yazawindawgyi
- Language: Burmese
- Series: Burmese chronicles
- Genre: Chronicle, History
- Publication date: 1905
- Publication place: Kingdom of Burma
- Preceded by: Dutiya Yazawin

Konbaung Set Maha Yazawindawgyi (Burmese: ကုန်းဘောင်ဆက် ရာဇဝင်တော်ကြီး, pronounced [kóʊɰ̃bàʊɰ̃ zɛʔ məhà jàzəwɪ̀ɰ̃dɔ̀dʑí]; lit. 'Chronicle of Konbaung Dynasty') is the last and unofficial royal chronicle of Burma (Myanmar), covering the Konbaung Dynasty (1752–1885). Its author, Maung Maung Tin, a Burmese official and a son of Konbaung royalty, took Konbaung period portions of the two previous official chronicles, Hmannan Yazawin and Dutiya Yazawin, added the last years (1854–1885) of the dynasty, and packaged it as the single Konbaung era chronicle. It was first published in 1905, and later updated in 1921 to include the death of King Thibaw in 1916 as a postscript.

== Brief ==
The author of the chronicle, Maung Maung Tin (also known as Mandalay U Tin) was a British colonial official as well as a son of Konbaung royalty. Tin updated the chronicle to 1885, to the fall of the monarchy, relying mainly on the court records obtained from several members of the royal library and also on the papers seized by the British and kept in libraries. As almost all of the Konbaung Dynasty's records had been destroyed when the royal library was burnt by British troops soon after King Thibaw Min's surrender in 1885, Tin had to begin the collection effort of the surviving source materials still in possession of many court members. (His collection, which continued until the Second World War, eventually grew to over 4000 palace manuscripts, including records, drawings, plays, etc. His lifelong collection stored at his Mandalay home would however be destroyed in 1942 during the Japanese invasion of Burma. The house was burned by the retreating Chinese forces of the Allied forces.)

For the compilation of Konbaung Set, he used the surviving materials as well as several interviews with the surviving members of the court. The main consultants to Tin were:

Name	Notes
Taungzin Mintha	Son of crown prince
Minhtin Maha Sithu	Governor of Wetmasut
Minhla Maha Zeya Nanda Thingyan U Hla Bu	Deputy Minister at Konbaung court
Minhtin Minhla Yaza U Hsu Pan	Royal messenger
Ne Myo Minhtin Yaza U Po Kywe	Privy Council member
Ne Myo Minhtin Yaza U Tote Kyi	Privy Council member and son-in-law of the crown prince

== Publications ==
All publications of Konbaung Set as of 2004 were in Burmese only. Konbaung Set was first published in 1905, and a second edition (with a small update of King Thibaw's death) was published in 1922. The second edition was reprinted as the third printing in 1967–1968. It was followed by the fourth printing in 2004.
