= Su Su Lwin =

Burmese politician (born 1952)

Her Excellency Su Su Lwin MP
- စုစုလွင်‌
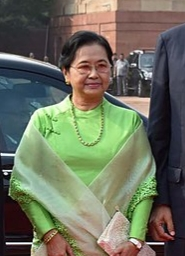
- Su Su Lwin in 2016

Member of the House of Representatives
- In office 2 May 2012 – 8 November 2020
- Preceded by: Myint Maung
- Constituency: Thongwa Township

First Lady of Myanmar
- In role 30 March 2016 – 21 March 2018
- President: Htin Kyaw
- Preceded by: Khin Khin Win
- Succeeded by: Khin Thet Htay (acting)

Personal details
- Born: 22 April 1952 (age 74) Yangon, Burma
- Party: National League for Democracy
- Spouse: Htin Kyaw (m. 1973)
- Education: University of Yangon; University of Sydney; Yangon Institute of Education

Su Su Lwin (Burmese: စုစုလွင်‌, pronounced [sṵ sṵ lwɪ̀ɰ̃]; born 22 April 1952) is a Burmese politician and former First Lady of Myanmar. She has been the MP for Thongwa Township in the House of Representatives since 2012. She is the wife of Htin Kyaw, the ninth President of Myanmar, who in March 2016 became the first civilian president of the country in 53 years.

== Early life and education ==
Su Su Lwin is the daughter of U Lwin, a veteran and former deputy prime minister of the Burma Socialist Programme Party (BSPP) regime as well as the founding member and secretary of the National League for Democracy (NLD). She is a descendant of a prince of the Konbaung dynasty Maung Maung Tin, who was a descendant of Ayodhya princess Kyauk Pwa Saw.

She spent her elementary school years in the United States. She studied at the Rangoon Institute of Education and graduated with a M.A. degree, and holds a post-graduate degree from the University of Sydney.

She married Htin Kyaw in 1973. The couple have no children.

== Career ==
=== Professional educator ===
Su Su Lwin worked for over ten years at Burma’s education research bureau after her graduation. She worked for UNICEF from 1990 to 2005 and later served as a freelance consultant for monastic education programs. She founded a local non-profit organization called Hantha Educators in 2006 that partnered with local influential monks and focused on improving traditional monastic education, early childhood care and development programs. Her organization stressed the importance of child-centered teaching and critical thinking.

=== Political career ===
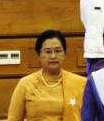
Su Su Lwin as MP

Su Su Lwin was elected for a parliamentary seat in the lower house (Pyithu Hluttaw)'s Thongwa Township constituency, in 2012 by-elections and 2015 general election. She helped to draft the controversial National Education Bill, which in 2015 resulted in nationwide student protests. She previously served as Chairperson of the International Relations Committee of the House of Representatives.

=== First Lady ===
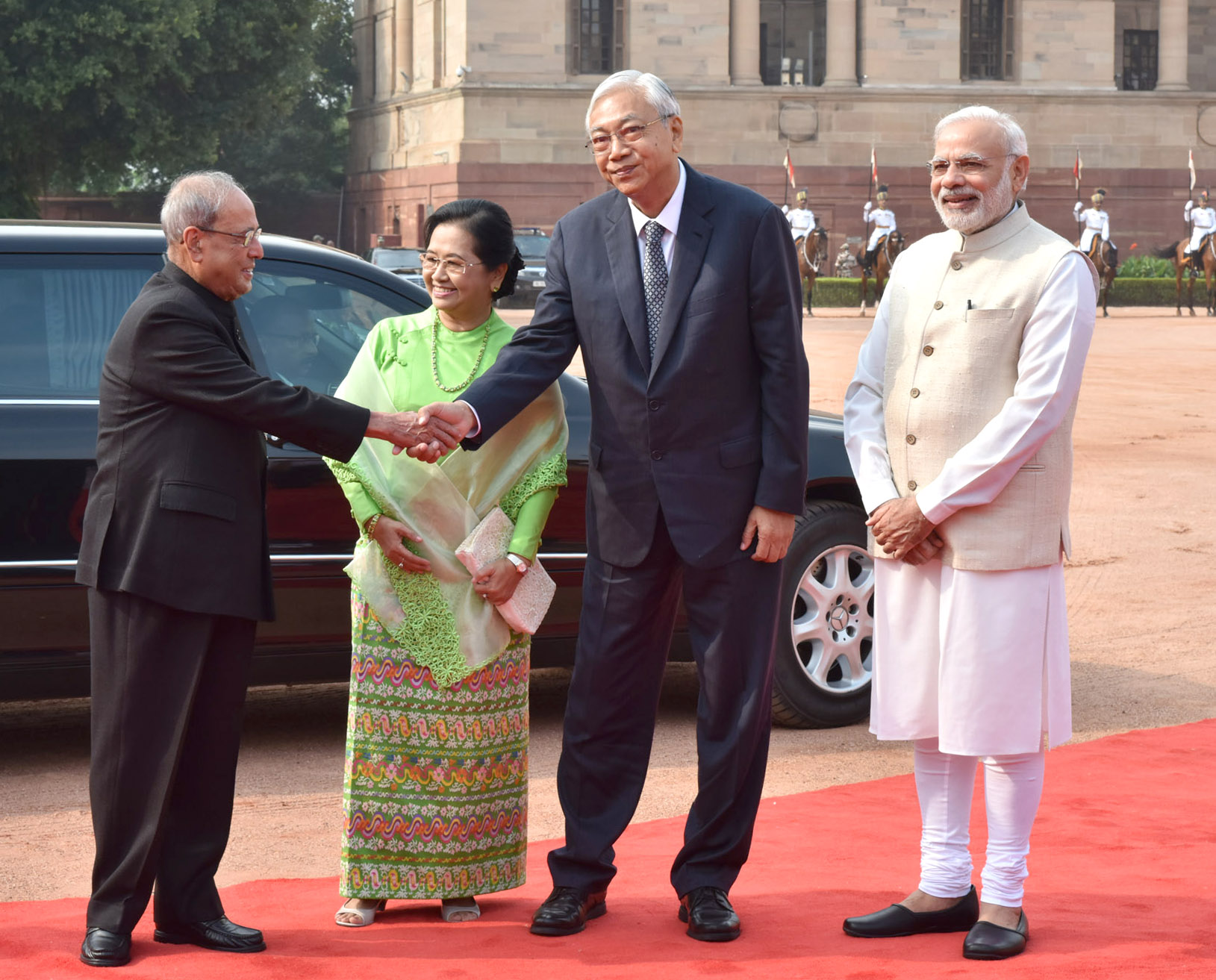
Su Su Lwin with Htin Kyaw during the State visit to India

She became the first lady of Myanmar when her husband became the president.

Honorary titles
Preceded by Khin Khin Win	First Lady of Myanmar; 2016–2018	Succeeded by Khin Thet Htay (Acting)
