= Dutiya Yazawin =

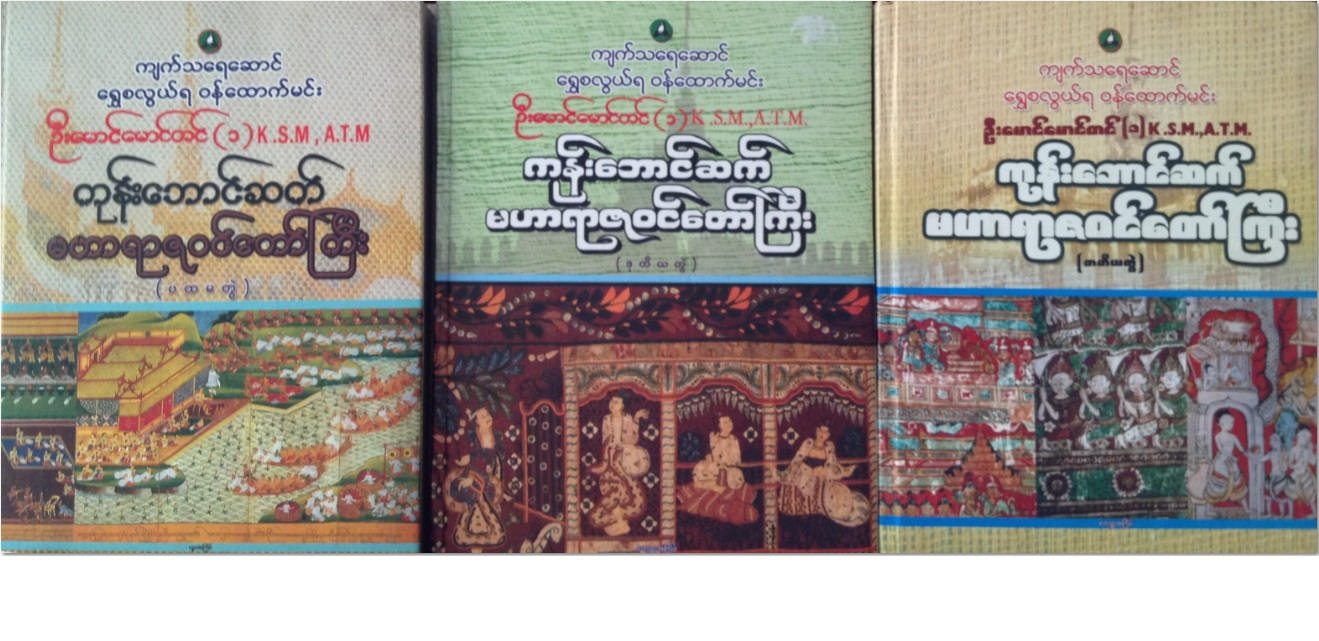
- Second Chronicle now packaged as part of "Konbaung Set" Chronicle
- Author: Royal Historical Commission
- Original title: ဒုတိယ မဟာ ရာဇဝင်တော်ကြီး Dutiya Maha Yazawindawgyi
- Language: Burmese
- Series: Burmese chronicles
- Genre: Chronicle, History
- Publication date: 1869
- Publication place: Kingdom of Burma
- Pages: 10 volumes
- Preceded by: Hmannan Yazawin
- Followed by: Konbaung Set Yazawin

Dutiya Maha Yazawindawgyi (Burmese: ဒုတိယ မဟာ ရာဇဝင်တော်ကြီး, pronounced [dṵtḭja̰ məhà jàzəwɪ̀ɰ̃dɔ̀dʑí]; lit. 'Second Great Chronicle') is the second official chronicle of Konbaung Dynasty of Burma (Myanmar). The continuation of Hmannan Yazawin, the Second Chronicle as it was commonly known adds the official record of the events between 1821 and 1854 including the two disastrous wars with the British.

== Brief ==
The work on the chronicle was begun by the Royal Historical Commission in 1867, about 15 years after an even more disastrous Second Anglo-Burmese War (1852), and about a year after a serious rebellion that killed Crown Prince Kanaung Mintha. A shaken King Mindon commissioned another committee of scholars to update Hmannan. The commission consisted of five members—senior court officials, a librarian, and a scribe. Whereas the first commission had stopped at 1821, just before the First Anglo-Burmese War (1824–1826), the second commission had no choice but to tackle the two disastrous wars that had their dismembered kingdom on the brink. The commission updated the chronicle up to 1854, right after the second war. The Second Chronicle's account of the two wars, according to historian Htin Aung, was "written with the objectivity of a true historian, and the great national defeats were described faithfully in detail." The second chronicle in ten volumes was completed in 1869.

== Publications ==
The Second Chronicle was first published in print in 1899. Today, it is published as part of a package of the three Konbaung era chronicles called Konbaung-Set Yazawin, which consists of the Konbaung era portions (1752–1821) of Hmannan, the Second Chronicle (1821–1854), and the third chronicle (1854–1885).
