= Kyu Kyu Hla =

First lady of Myanmar (born 1954)

Her Excellency Agga Maha Thiri Thudhamma Theingi: Daw; Kyu Kyu Hla
- ကြူကြူလှ
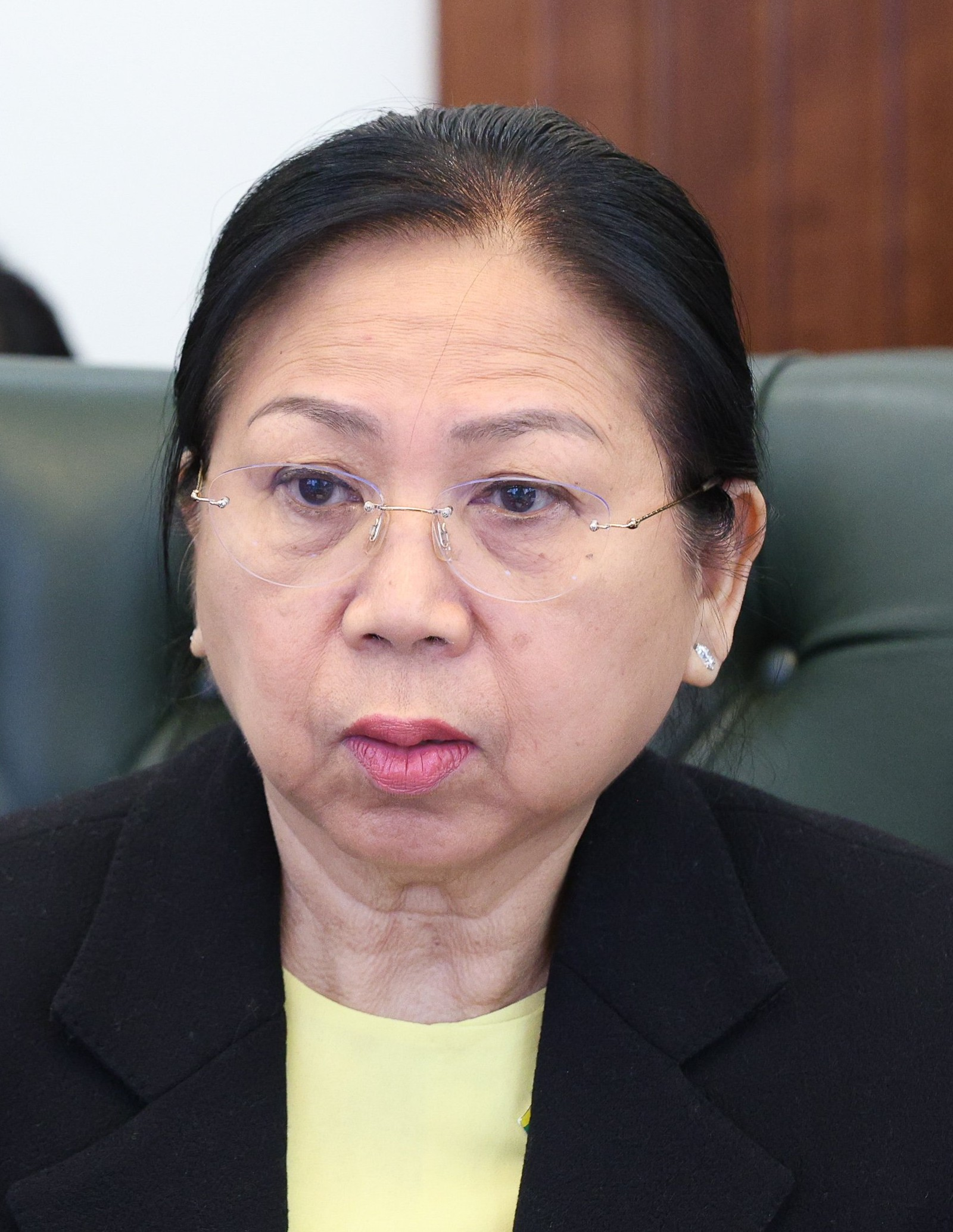
- Kyu Kyu Hla in 2025

First Lady of Myanmar
- Current
- Assumed role 10 April 2026
- President: Min Aung Hlaing
- Preceded by: Cho Cho

Spouse of the Prime Minister of Myanmar
- In role 1 August 2021 – 31 July 2025
- Prime Minister: Min Aung Hlaing
- Preceded by: Khin Khin Win
- Succeeded by: San San Aye

Personal details
- Born: 13 April 1954 (age 72) Zee Kyun village, Thandwe, Rakhine State; Yangon, Burma (self-claimed) (Note: According to her author profile in the state-owned newspaper New Light of Myanmar, she was born in Yangon, Myanmar.)
- Citizenship: Burmese
- Spouse: Min Aung Hlaing (m. 1980)
- Children: Aung Pyae Sone; Khin Thiri Thet Mon
- Education: Rangoon University
- Occupation: Educator
- Awards: Agga Maha Thiri Thudhamma Theingi

Kyu Kyu Hla (Burmese: ကြူကြူလှ; pronounced [tɕʰú tɕʰú l̥à]; born 13 April 1954) is the first lady of Myanmar as the wife of president and former military leader Min Aung Hlaing. She is a retired educator who served as a lecturer at the Myanmar language department of Yangon University.

She became spouse of the Prime Minister of Myanmar following her husband's transition to Prime Minister of Myanmar on 1 August 2021, whereupon Min Aung Hlaing has ruled the nation as Chairman of the State Administration Council after the 2021 Myanmar coup d'état. She is also the honorary patron of Myanmar Women's Affairs.

== Early life and career ==
Kyu Kyu Hla was born on 13 April 1954 in Yangon, or Zee Kyun village under Auk Nat Maw village-tract in Thandwe, Rakhine State, to parents Maung Maung Hla and Ohn Hla. In 1970, she passed her matriculation exam. In 1974, she graduated with a B.A. in Myanmar and earned her M.A. in Myanmar in 1981 from Rangoon University. She worked as a tutor at Rangoon University in 1981 and later moved to Taunggyi College in 1986.

In 1989, she served as an assistant lecturer at Rangoon University, retiring from her academic post in 1994. She married Min Aung Hlaing when he was a junior military officer in 1980.

== Influence ==
Kyu Kyu Hla gained influence within the military community and led the wives of high-ranking military officers when her husband Min Aung Hlaing later became the Commander-in-Chief of the Myanmar Army. She is nicknamed "Amay Kyu" (Mother Kyu) by military circles, in a similar style to how Aung San Suu Kyi is referred to as "Mother Su" by the public. High-ranking military defectors claim that she holds personal animosity toward and is envious of Aung San Suu Kyi’s reputation and popularity.

She regularly accompanies her husband as a member of military delegations to foreign countries.

In February 2020, Kyu Kyu Hla and her husband Min Aung Hlaing together placed the "Hti" umbrella on top Bagan's most powerful ancient Htilominlo Temple. The meaning of the temple name is "need the royal umbrella, need the King". Many people believed that the ceremony was a yadaya and seeking divine blessings for her husband's glory.

Kyu Kyu Hla became a major target of a domestic boycott and social punishment by people who oppose the military regime when her husband Min Aung Hlaing seized power from a democratically elected government, the National League for Democracy (NLD), and whose the military regime has killed nearly 2,000 anti-coup protesters.

On 22 February 2021, detained government economic policy advisor Sean Turnell's wife, Ha Vu, an Australian-Vietnamese academic, wrote a letter to Kyu Kyu Hla, appealing "wife to wife" for her husband’s release.

Kyu Kyu Hla was widely criticized on 29 November 2021 when junta-controlled media reported that Kyu Kyu Hla led families from the Office of the Commander-in-Chief of Defense Services to chant Paṭṭhāna, the seventh text of the Theravāda Buddhism philosophy, to pray for peace and for Myanmar to overcome catastrophes. At that event, she was seated in a cushioned chair in the centre of the hall while the wives of military personnel sat on the floor. A chair is commonly used as a metaphor for power in Myanmar politics, prompting many comments on social media such as, "Not only the husband, but also Kyu Kyu Hla craves a chair."

Kyu Kyu Hla has been writing pro-military articles and poems in anniversary editions of military magazines under the pen name of Thiri Pyae Sone May (Myanmarsar). She wrote a poem commemorating the 75th anniversary of the Myanmar Air Force, "To Diamond Jubilee Air Force", that was featured in the state-controlled newspapers. The poem praised the Myanmar Air Force, which has carried out numerous lethal air raids on civilians and non-military targets in Hpakant, also known as the Hpakant massacre.

During the military council meeting on 13 February 2022, Min Aung Hlaing praised to his wife Kyu Kyu Hla as "a teacher who had made significant sacrifices".

On 2 March 2023, the military government awarded her the title of Agga Maha Thiri Thudhamma Theingi, one of the country’s highest religious honours, for significantly contributing to the flowering and propagation of Buddhism.

Kyu Kyu Hla delivered a video speech to the Fourth Eurasian Women's Forum, held from September 18 to 20, 2024, in Saint Petersburg, Russia. In her speech, she emphasized the importance of recognizing and celebrating not only the everyday contributions of women but also their courage, confidence, perseverance, leadership, resilience, and creativity in tackling global challenges.

Allegedly defaming Kyu Kyu Hla and the Myanmar military via online posts, Thamee Soe, a Myanmar-born American internet influencer, was arrested on 12 October 2025 at Yangon International Airport. She has been charged under Section 505(a) of the Penal Code and Section 66(d) of the Telecommunications Law.

== Sanctions ==
The U.S. Department of the Treasury has imposed sanctions on Kyu Kyu Hla since 2 July 2021, pursuant to Executive Order 14014, in response to the Burmese military's coup against the democratically elected civilian government of Myanmar. The sanctions include the freezing of assets in the US and a ban on transactions with US persons.

== Personal life ==
Kyu Kyu Hla is a collector of luxury designer handbags and is often seen carrying them at state visits and public events. Her collection features brands such as Hermès, Louis Vuitton (LV), Prada, and Yves Saint Laurent (YSL), and is valued at approximately US$274,000 (over one billion kyats) based on retail prices.
