= First Lady of Myanmar =

Wife of the head of state of Myanmar

- မဟာဒေဝီ
- Currently in role Kyu Kyu Hla since 10 April 2026
- Style: Her Excellency
- Residence: Presidential Palace, Naypyidaw
- Inaugural holder: Sao Nang Hearn Kham
- Formation: 4 January 1948

First Lady of the Republic of the Union of Myanmar (Burmese: မြန်မာနိုင်ငံ ၏ မဟာဒေဝီ(သို့)မြန်မာနိုင်ငံ၏ သမ္မတကတော်) is the title held by the wife of the president or the head of the state. The first lady is also the patron of the Myanmar Women Affairs.

== List of first ladies of Myanmar ==
No.	Name	Picture	President/Head of State	Tenure start	Tenure end	Days
1	Sao Nang Hearn Kham		Sao Shwe Thaik	4 January 1948	12 March 1952	1529
2	Khin Saw Oo (daughter of Ba U)		Ba U	16 March 1952	13 March 1957	1823
3	Mya May		Win Maung	13 March 1957	2 March 1962	1815
4	Khin May Than		Ne Win	2 March 1962	30 September 1972	3865
5	Ni Ni Myint		Ne Win	3 April 1973		
6	June Rose Bellamy		Ne Win	24 December 1976	1 May 1977	128
5	Ni Ni Myint		Ne Win		5 December 2002	
7	Than Shein		San Yu	9 November 1981	27 July 1988	2452
8	Shwe Tin		Sein Lwin			
9	Khin May Hnin		Maung Maung	19 August 1988	18 September 1988	30
10	Aye Yee		Saw Maung			
11	Kyaing Kyaing		Than Shwe	23 April 1992	30 March 2011	6915
12	Khin Khin Win		Thein Sein	30 March 2011	30 March 2016	1827
13	Su Su Lwin		Htin Kyaw	30 March 2016	21 March 2018	721
–	Khin Thet Htay (Acting)		Myint Swe	21 March 2018	30 March 2018	9
14	Cho Cho		Win Myint	30 March 2018	1 February 2021	1039
–	Khin Thet Htay (Acting)		Myint Swe	1 February 2021	7 August 2025	1648
–	Kyu Kyu Hla (Acting)		Min Aung Hlaing	22 July 2024	10 April 2026	627
15	Kyu Kyu Hla		Min Aung Hlaing	10 April 2026	Currently in role	−211
