= Cho Cho =

First Lady of Myanmar

Her Excellency Cho Cho
- ချိုချို
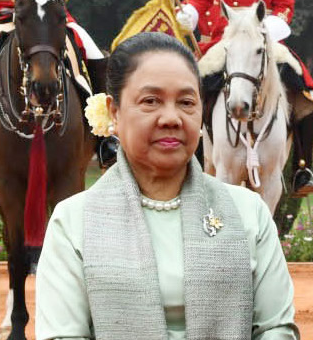
- Cho Cho at Rashtrapati Bhavan, in New Delhi on February 27, 2020

First Lady of Myanmar
- In role 30 March 2018 – 1 February 2021
- President: Win Myint
- Preceded by: Khin Thet Htay (acting)
- Succeeded by: Kyu Kyu Hla

Personal details
- Born: Danubyu, Burma
- Spouse: Win Myint
- Parent(s): Tun Min (father); Win Kyi (mother)

Cho Cho (Burmese: ချိုချို) is the wife of Win Myint, the tenth President of Myanmar. She served as the First Lady of Myanmar from 2018 to 2021, when her husband was removed from office in a coup d'état.

== Biography ==
Cho Cho was born in Danubyu, Ayeyarwady Region, Burma to Tun Min and Win Kyi. She is the third daughter of a prosperous business family of Danubyu. Her family owns Zabu Tun Cinema and Thapyay Nyo traditional medicine production. She attended for basic education High School No. 6 Pathein. She met Win Myint in their childhood. They have one son and one daughter. Their daughter, Phyu Phyu Thin, is a senior advisor of City Mart Holdings and manager of Ocean Supercenter. Their son died at the age of 16 while Win Myint was being held at the Yemon Detention Centre, in Bago Region. She was overcome with grief as her husband was under detention and her only son died. She had to organize the funeral on her own and Win Myint was only allowed to attend the Buddhist ritual at their home seven days after the death of their son.

Without a job or income after the release of Win Myint, she had to sell her jewelry to support the family and provide schooling for their daughter Phyu Phyu Thin.

She has given unconditional support to her husband Win Myint, ever since the pro-democracy uprising in 1988. MP Khin San Hlaing commented on Cho Cho, "Daw Cho Cho was the perfect wife for a politician. She supported her husband’s political aspirations all the way with courage". She is also known as "Mother Cho" among younger NLD members.

Cho Cho became First Lady of the country when Win Myint became 10th President of Myanmar, following the resignation of Htin Kyaw as President of Myanmar on 30 March 2018.

Honorary titles
Preceded by Khin Thet Htay (Acting)	First Lady of Myanmar; 2018–2021	Succeeded by Khin Thet Htay (Acting)
