= Myanmar Women's Affairs Federation =

Non-governmental organisation in Myanmar

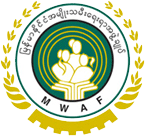
Seal

Myanmar Women's Affairs Federation (မြန်မာနိုင်ငံအမျိုးသမီးရေးရာအဖွဲ့ချုပ်) is a non-governmental organisation based in Myanmar that focuses on promoting the welfare and advancement of Burmese women. This organisation is noticed by UN, WWF, Asia Regional Cooperation to Prevent People Trafficking (ARCPPT), and ASEAN, China Women Affair Organization. It has been listed as a GONGO for being a harsh critic of Aung San Suu Kyi and is purportedly ruled by wives of the Burmese junta.

The organisation was formed on 20 December 2003 with the aim to enable women to participate fully in national development. It is a voluntary NGO for the advancement of all women, regardless of nationality, race or religion.

The Myanmar Women's Affairs Federation has the following objectives:

1. To enhance the role of women in the reconstruction of a peaceful, modern and developed nation.
2. To protect the rights of women.
3. To ensure better economy, health, education and general welfare of women and to take measures for their life security.
4. To instill and foster in women a greater appreciation of their cultural heritage, traditions and customs.
5. To systematically protect women from violence and provide means for rehabilitation where necessary.
6. To diminish and finally eliminate trafficking in women and children as a national task.
7. To collaborate with international as well as local organisations, in ensuring the rights of women in accordance with the local traditions and customs.

The first workshop organised by MWAF on trafficking in persons was held on 24 November 2006. MWAF has also held educative talks on the prevention of trafficking in persons.
