= Presidential Palace, Naypyidaw =

Official residence of the head of state of Myanmar

Presidential Palace
- Burmese: သမ္မတအိမ်တော်
- Myanmar Presidential Palace

- Location within Myanmar

General information
- Location: Yaza Htarni Road, Zeyatheiddhi Ward, Zabuthiri Township, Naypyidaw, Myanmar
- Coordinates: 19°46′03″N 96°07′07″E
- Current tenants: Min Aung Hlaing, President
- Completed: 2010

The Presidential Palace (Burmese: သမ္မတအိမ်တော်) is the executive office and official residence of the Myanmar head of state and government, the President of Myanmar as well as the Vice-President of Myanmar. It is located in the capital city of Myanmar, Nay Pyi Taw. The 100-room palace is a complex of buildings, surrounded by a moat that can be crossed by bridges and is adorned with the lion throne in its principal hall, symbolizing the right to executive power and historical inheritance.

The palace was constructed by Eden Construction, while the roads and bridges leading to the palace were overseen by the military's Engineering Corps.

Acting President Myint Swe did not move into the Presidential Palace following the 2021 coup d'état. Instead, junta leader Min Aung Hlaing occupied the palace. Min Aung Hlaing has held diplomatic receptions and award ceremonies at the palace, for which he has worn the presidential sash, even before he assumed the presidential post in 2024. The 2025 Myanmar earthquake on 28 March significantly damaged the palace.

== Gallery ==
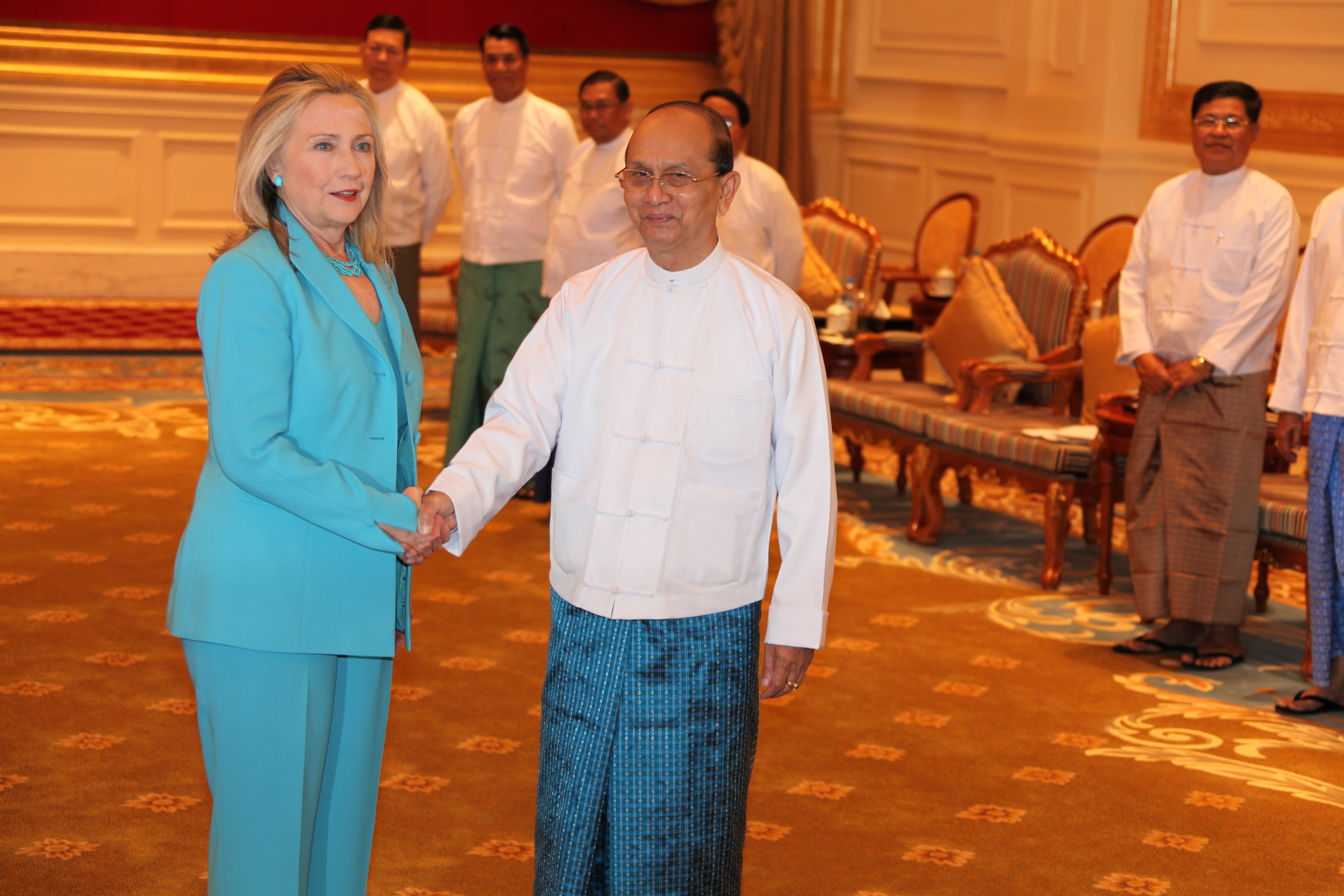
Thein Sein with Hillary Clinton

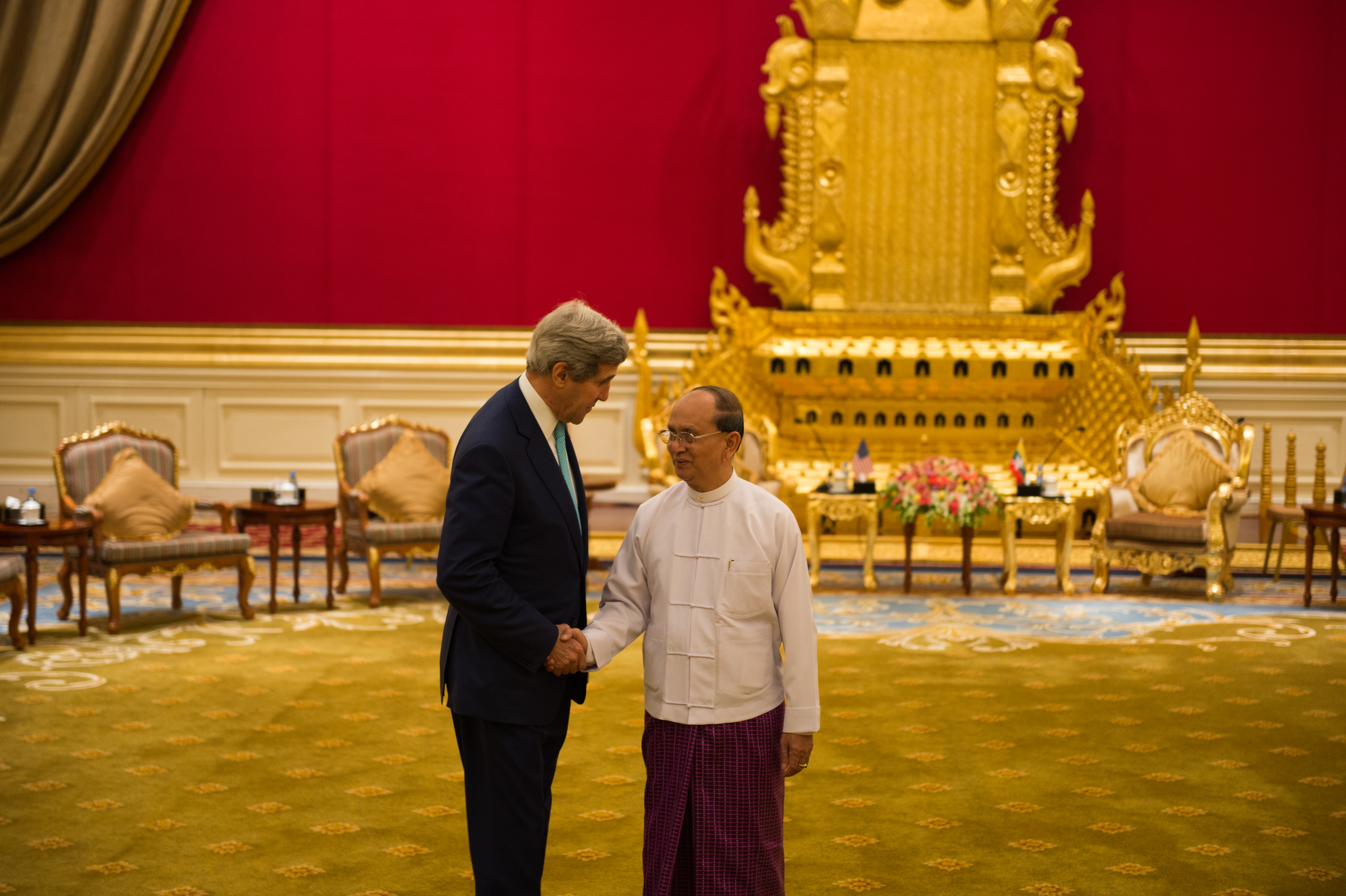
Thein Sein with John Kerry in front of the Throne

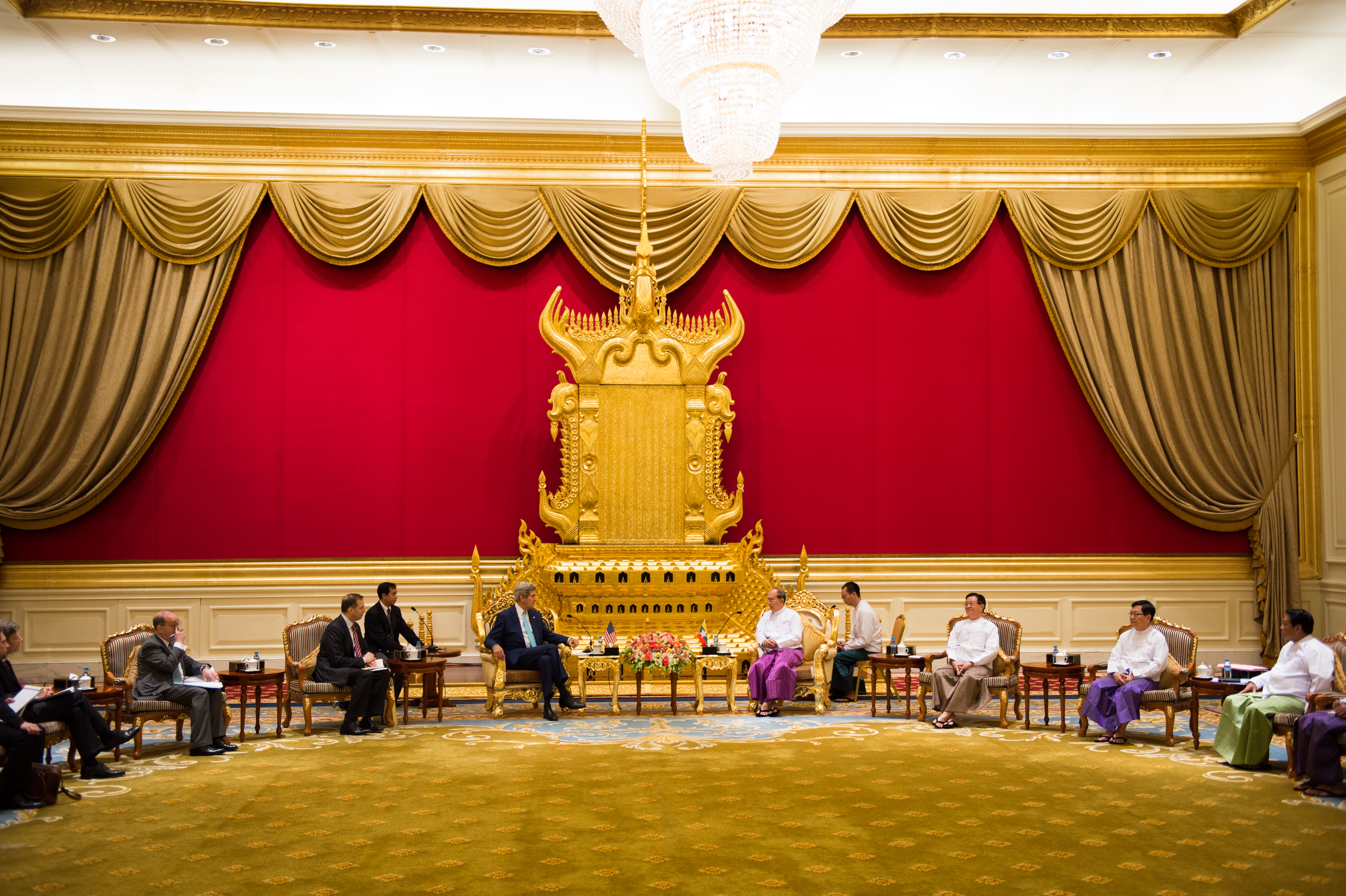
The main room where to meet the first class visitors

Obama meeting with President Thein Sein

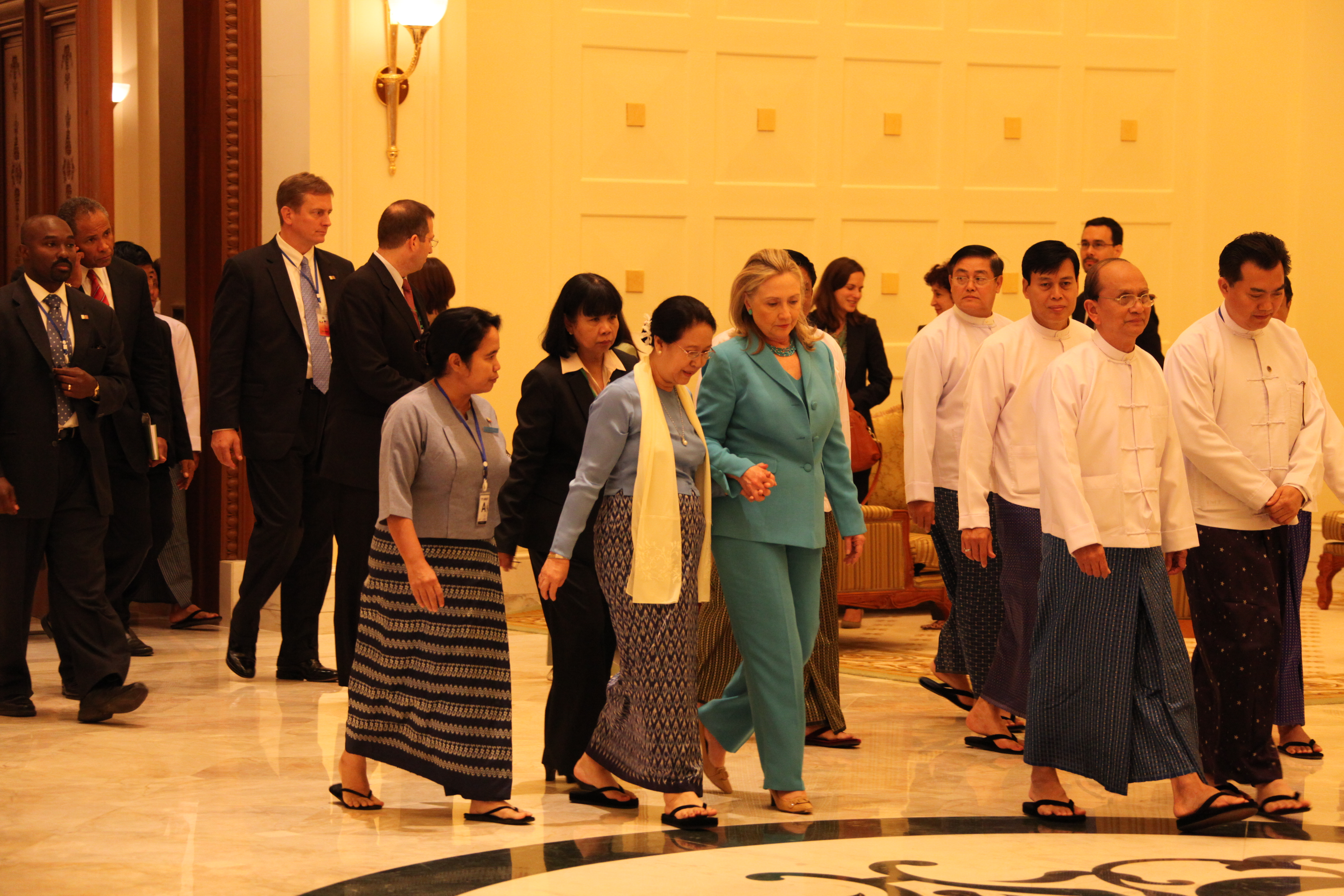
President, First Lady and Hillary Clinton

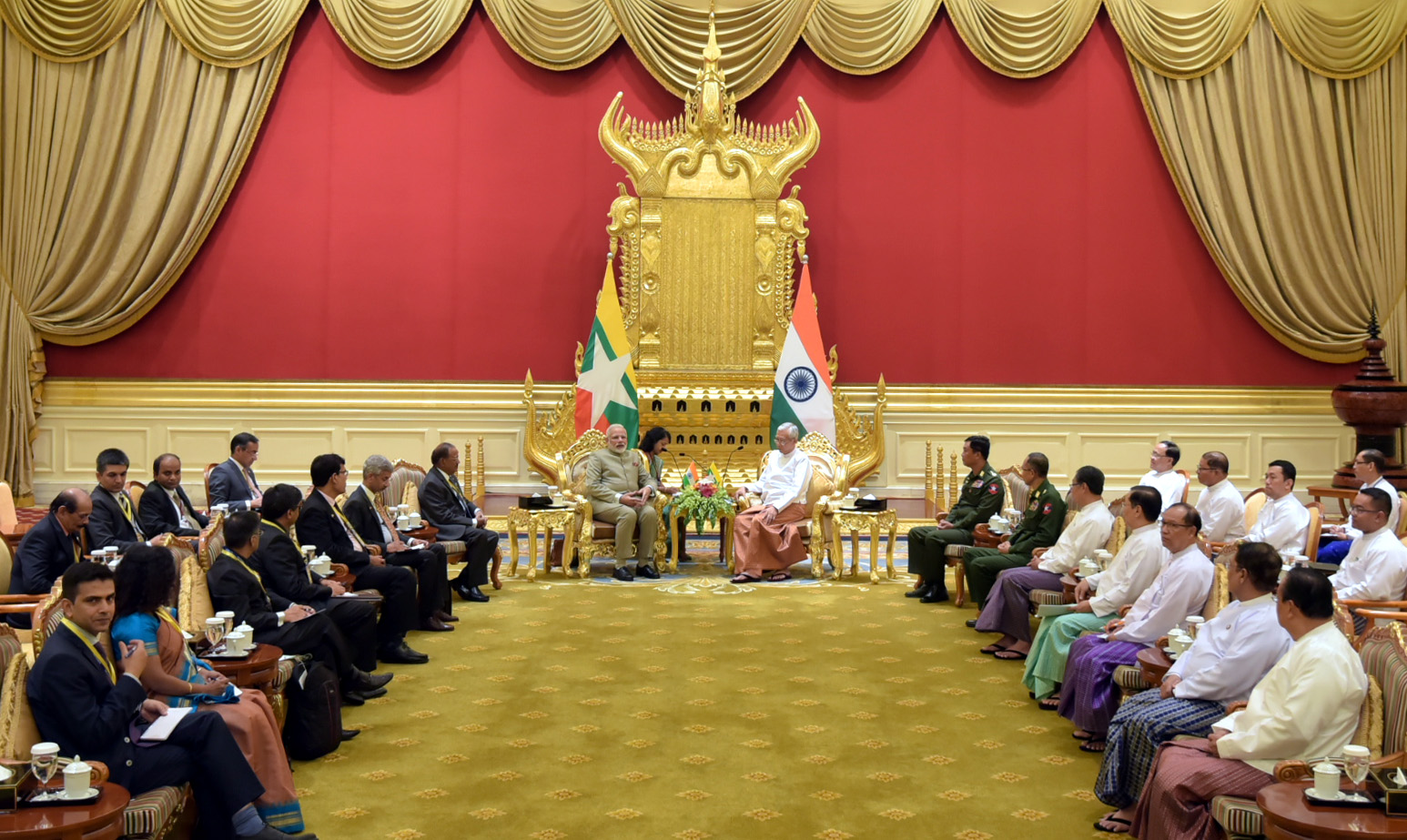
Narendra Modi meeting with President Htin Kyaw at Presidential Palace in 2017

== See also ==
- Government House, Rangoon
