= List of heads of state of Myanmar since 1948 =

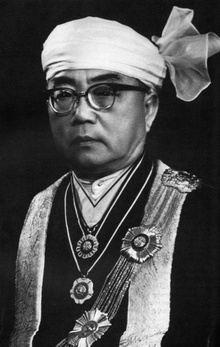
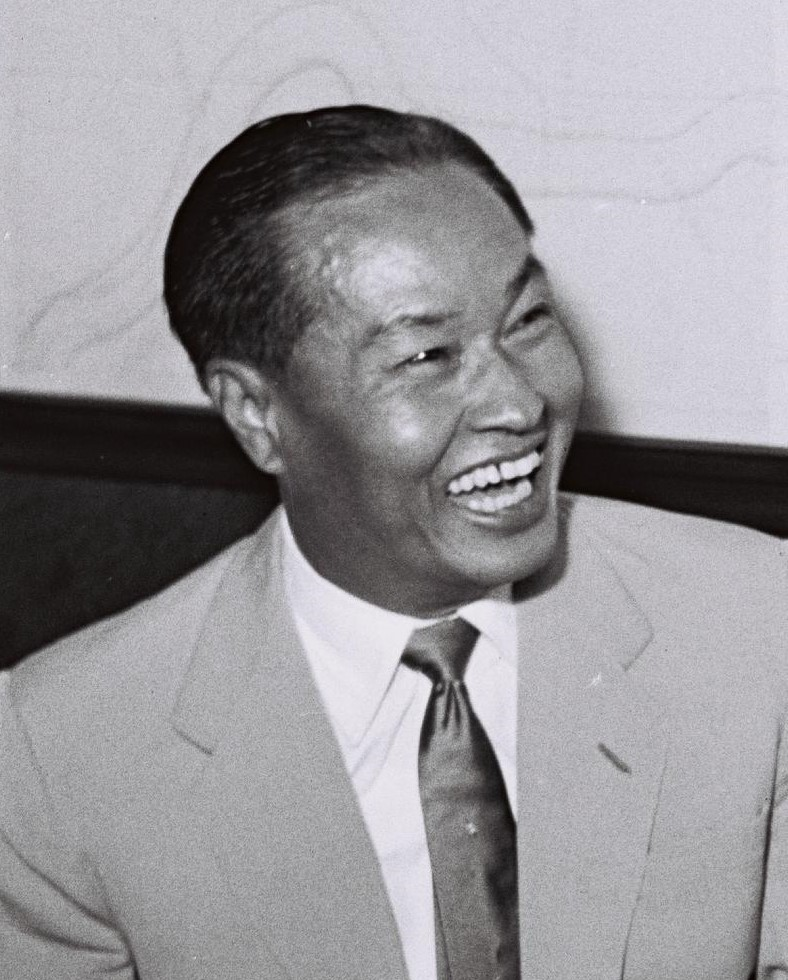
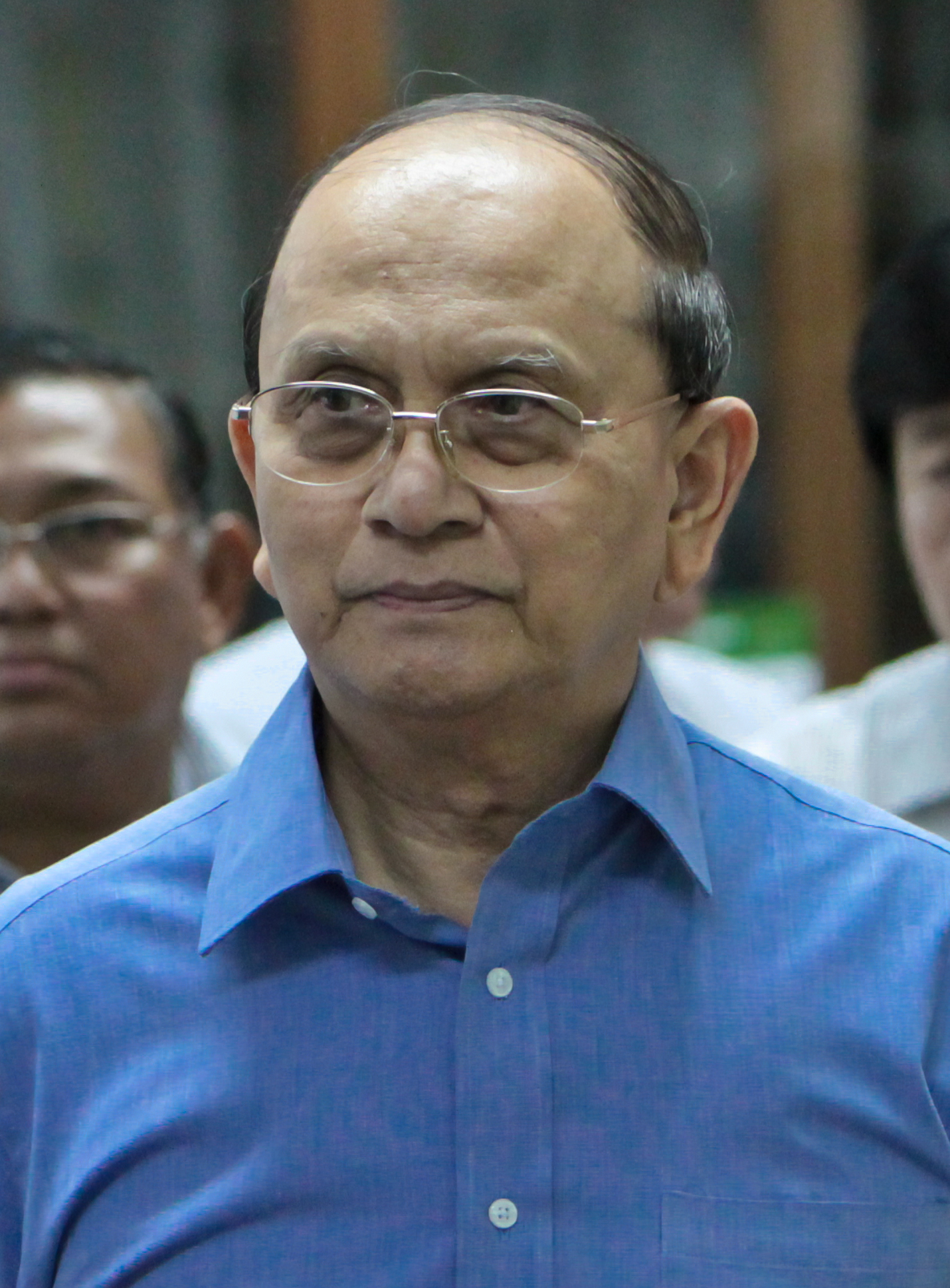
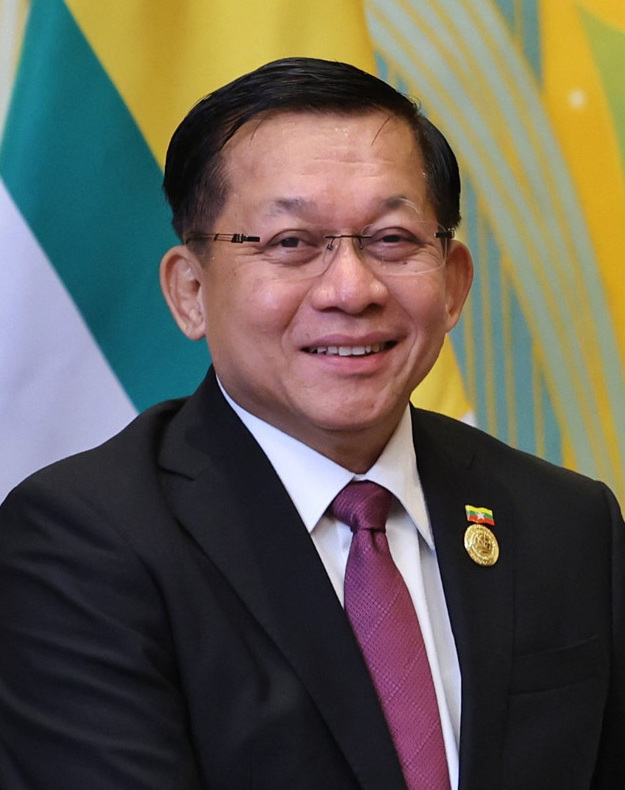
- Top left: Sao Shwe Thaik was the first president of the Union of Burma.
- Top right: Ne Win was the longest-serving head of state who turned the Union into military dictatorship.
- Bottom left: Thein Sein was considered as a reformist leader in the post-junta government.
- Botton right: Min Aung Hlaing is the current president.

This article lists the presidents and de facto heads of state of Myanmar (Burma) since the Burmese Declaration of Independence in 1948. During the periods of direct military rule in 1962–1974 and 1988–2011, the office of president was abolished and chairman of military junta served as head of state.

== Titles ==
Period	Position
1948–1952	Provisional President (နိုင်ငံတော်ယာယီသမ္မတ)
1952–1962; 1974–1988; 2011–2021; 2026–present	President (နိုင်ငံတော်သမ္မတ)
1962–1974	Chairman of the State Revolutionary Council (နိုင်ငံတော်တော်လှန်ရေးကောင်စီဥက္ကဋ္ဌ) Chairman of the Revolutionary Council of the Union of Burma (ပြည်ထောင်စုမြန်မာနိုင်ငံတော်လှန်ရေးကောင်စီဥက္ကဋ္ဌ)
1974–1988	Chairman of the Council of State, President of the Republic (နိုင်ငံတော်ကောင်စီဥက္ကဋ္ဌ၊ နိုင်ငံတော်သမ္မတ)
1988–1997	Chairman of the State Law and Order Restoration Council (နိုင်ငံတော်ငြိမ်ဝပ်ပိပြားမှုတည်ဆောက်ရေးအဖွဲ့ဥက္ကဋ္ဌ)
1997–2011	Chairman of the State Peace and Development Council (နိုင်ငံတော်အေးချမ်းသာယာရေးနှင့်ဖွံ့ဖြိုးရေးကောင်စီဥက္ကဋ္ဌ)
2021–2026	Pro Tem President (ယာယီသမ္မတ)
1988; 2018; 2026	Acting President (ယာယီသမ္မတ)

== List of officeholders ==
Political parties

Anti-Fascist People's Freedom League (AFPFL)
Burma Socialist Programme Party (BSPP)
Union Solidarity and Development Party (USDP)
National League for Democracy (NLD)

Other affiliations

Military

Status

Acting president or de facto head of state

(Dates in italics indicate de facto continuation of office)

No.	Portrait	Name (Lifespan)	Term of office			Election	Political party	Ref.
No.	Portrait	Name (Lifespan)	Start	End	Duration	Election	Political party	Ref.
=== Union of Burma (1948–1974) ===
1		Sao Shwe Thaik စဝ်ရွှေသိုက် (1895–1962)	4 January 1948 (Note: Titled "Provisional President" according to the Article 231 of the 1947 Constitution, as he was elected by the pre-independence Constituent Assembly and not by the post-independence Union Parliament. Although the Burmese word for "provisional president", "acting president" and "pro tem president" is the same, he is included in the official list of presidents, unlike acting and pro tem ones, as the first holder.)	16 March 1952	4 years, 72 days	1947	Anti-Fascist People's Freedom League	
2		Ba U ဘဦး (1887–1963)	16 March 1952	13 March 1957	4 years, 362 days	1952	Anti-Fascist People's Freedom League	
3		Win Maung ဝင်းမောင် (1916–1989)	13 March 1957	2 March 1962 (Deposed in a coup)	4 years, 354 days	1957	Anti-Fascist People's Freedom League (Union Karen League)	
—		Ne Win နေဝင်း (1911–2002)	2 March 1962	2 March 1974	12 years	Junta	Military / Burma Socialist Programme Party	
Position vacant; power was handed to Pyithu Hluttaw (2 – 4 March 1974)
=== Socialist Republic of the Union of Burma (1974–1988) ===
4		Ne Win နေဝင်း (1911–2002)	4 March 1974	9 November 1981 (Note: Voluntarily stepped down after the 1981 general election.)	7 years, 250 days	1974; 1978	Burma Socialist Programme Party	
5		San Yu စန်းယု (1918–1996)	9 November 1981	27 July 1988 (Resigned)	6 years, 261 days	1981; 1985	Burma Socialist Programme Party	
6		Sein Lwin စိန်လွင် (1924–2004)	27 July 1988	12 August 1988 (Resigned)	16 days	—	Burma Socialist Programme Party	
—		Aye Ko အေးကို (1921–2006)	12 August 1988	19 August 1988	7 days	—	Burma Socialist Programme Party	
7		Maung Maung မောင်မောင် (1925–1994)	19 August 1988	18 September 1988 (Deposed in a coup)	30 days	—	Burma Socialist Programme Party	
=== Union of Burma / Myanmar (1988–2011) ===
—		Saw Maung စောမောင် (1928–1997)	18 September 1988	23 April 1992 (Deposed) (Note: Resigned for health reasons, de facto deposed by rival generals.)	3 years, 218 days	Junta	Military	
—		Than Shwe သန်းရွှေ (born 1933)	23 April 1992	30 March 2011 (Note: Handed over power to the civilian government after the 2010 general election.)	18 years, 341 days	Junta	Military / Union Solidarity and Development Association	
=== Republic of the Union of Myanmar (2011–present) ===
8		Thein Sein သိန်းစိန် (born 1945)	30 March 2011	30 March 2016	5 years	2011	Union Solidarity and Development Party	
9		Htin Kyaw ထင်ကျော် (born 1946)	30 March 2016	21 March 2018 (Resigned)	1 year, 356 days	2016	National League for Democracy	
—		Myint Swe မြင့်ဆွေ (1951–2025)	21 March 2018	30 March 2018	9 days	—	Union Solidarity and Development Party	
10		Win Myint ဝင်းမြင့် (born 1951)	30 March 2018	1 February 2021 (Deposed in a coup)	2 years, 308 days	2018	National League for Democracy	
—		Myint Swe မြင့်ဆွေ (1951–2025)	1 February 2021 (Note: Titled "Pro Tem (President)" in the English version of Ordinance 1/2021; later called "Pro Tem President" by state-own English media outlets.)	7 August 2025 (Note: Myint Swe took medical leave on 18 June 2024, and temporarily transferred NDSC-related presidential duties to Min Aung Hlaing (the chairman of the State Administration Council) on 22 July 2024, for the duration of the medical leave, with Myint Swe remaining in office. Myint Swe died in office on 7 August 2025.) (Died in office)	4 years, 187 days	—	Union Solidarity and Development Party	
—		Min Aung Hlaing မင်းအောင်လှိုင် (born 1956)	7 August 2025 (Note: Myint Swe died in office as Acting President, as reported by state media and independently verified by outlets including The New York Times. Up to that point, Min Aung Hlaing was using the title Pro Tem President (On Duty) when signing legislation by the National Defence and Security Council (NDSC), based on Myint Swe's delegation of authority starting with his medical leave on 22 July 2024. When the NDSC met for the first time after Myint Swe's death, in February 2026, Min Aung Hlaing signed NDSC legislation as Acting President.)	10 April 2026 (Note: Despite having retired from the office of Commander-in-Chief of Defence Services, he still used the military rank of Senior General and the title of Acting President until hours before his inauguration as president on 10 April 2026.)	246 days	—	Military	
11		Min Aung Hlaing မင်းအောင်လှိုင် (born 1956)	10 April 2026	Incumbent	169 days	2026	Union Solidarity and Development Party (Note: Independent until 20 September 2026.)	

== See also ==
- Politics of Myanmar
- History of Myanmar
- List of Burmese monarchs
- List of heads of state of Myanmar
- List of colonial governors of Burma
- List of premiers of British Burma
- President of Myanmar
- Vice-President of Myanmar
- Prime Minister of Myanmar
  - List of heads of government of Myanmar since 1948
- Deputy Prime Minister of Myanmar
- State Counsellor of Myanmar
- Chairman of the State Administration Council
