= Lanzin Youth Organization =

Programme Youth Organization လမ်းစဉ်လူငယ်အဖွဲ့
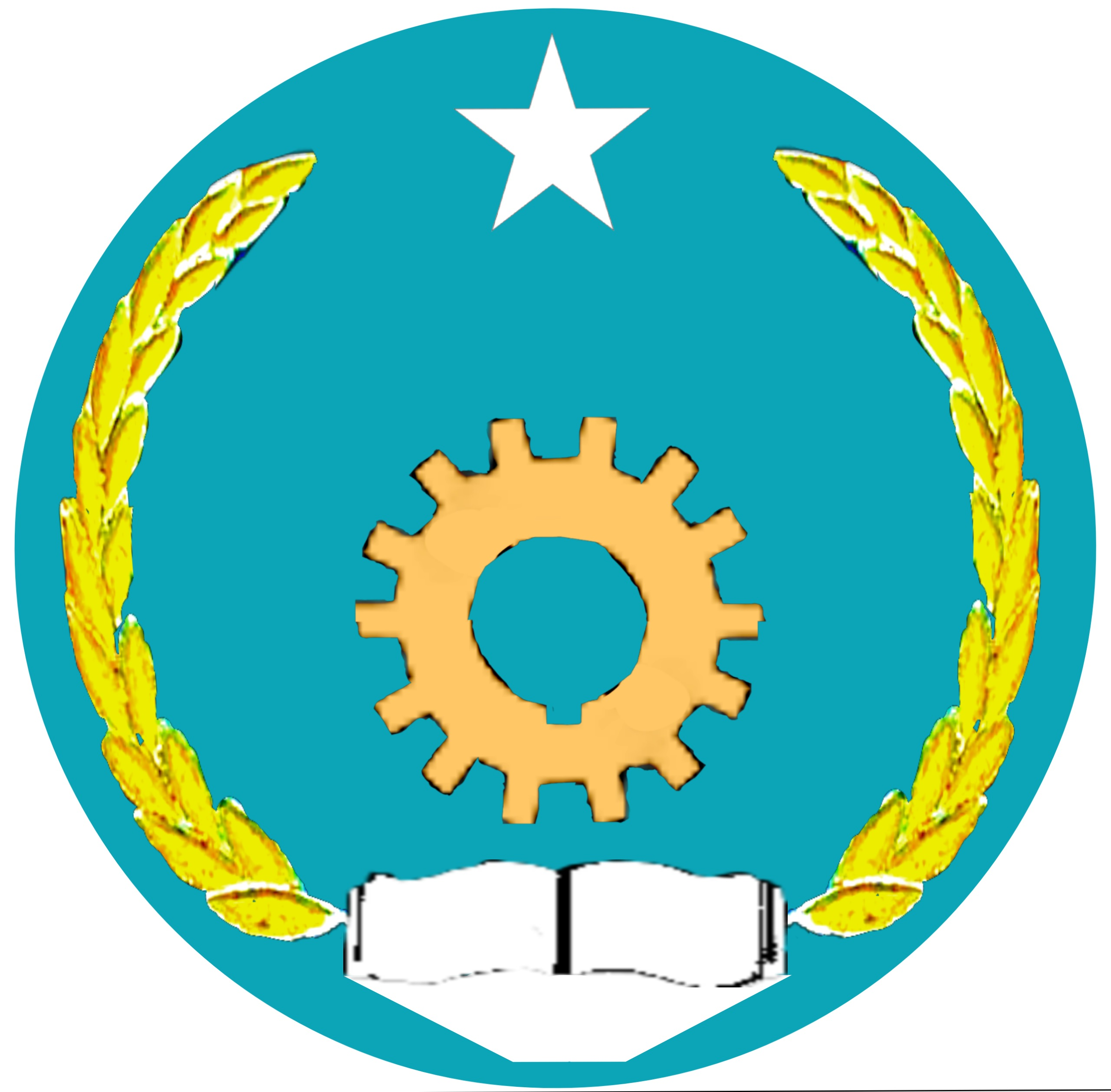
- Badge of Lanzin Youth Organization
- Founded: 1964
- Preceded by: Union of Burma Boy Scouts; Union of Burma Girl Guides Association
- Dissolved: 1988
- Succeeded by: Youth Committee of the National Unity Party; Myanmar Scouts Association; Myanmar Girl Guides
- Headquarters: Rangoon, Rangoon Division, Socialist Republic of the Union of Burma
- Membership: 2,875,500 (1979)
- Ideology: Socialist Education
- Mother party: Burma Socialist Programme Party (1964-1988)

The Lanzin Youth Organization (Burmese: လမ်းစဉ်လူငယ်အဖွဲ့, lit. 'Programme Youth Organization') was a youth organization in the Socialist Republic of the Union of Burma (present-day Myanmar) for high school and university students to learn useful skills and about the socialist politics of the Burma Socialist Programme Party. It consisted of three main branches: Teza Youth (Burmese: တေဇလူငယ်, lit. 'Glorious Youth'), Shehsaung Youth (Burmese: ရှေ့ဆောင်လူငယ်, lit. 'Pioneer Youth'), and Lanzin Youth (Burmese: လမ်းစဉ်လူငယ်, lit. 'Programme Youth'). Teza Youth each wore a blue scarf, and Pioneer Youth each wore a red scarf.

A postcard of 3rd Seminar of the Programme Youth,1982

== Establishment ==
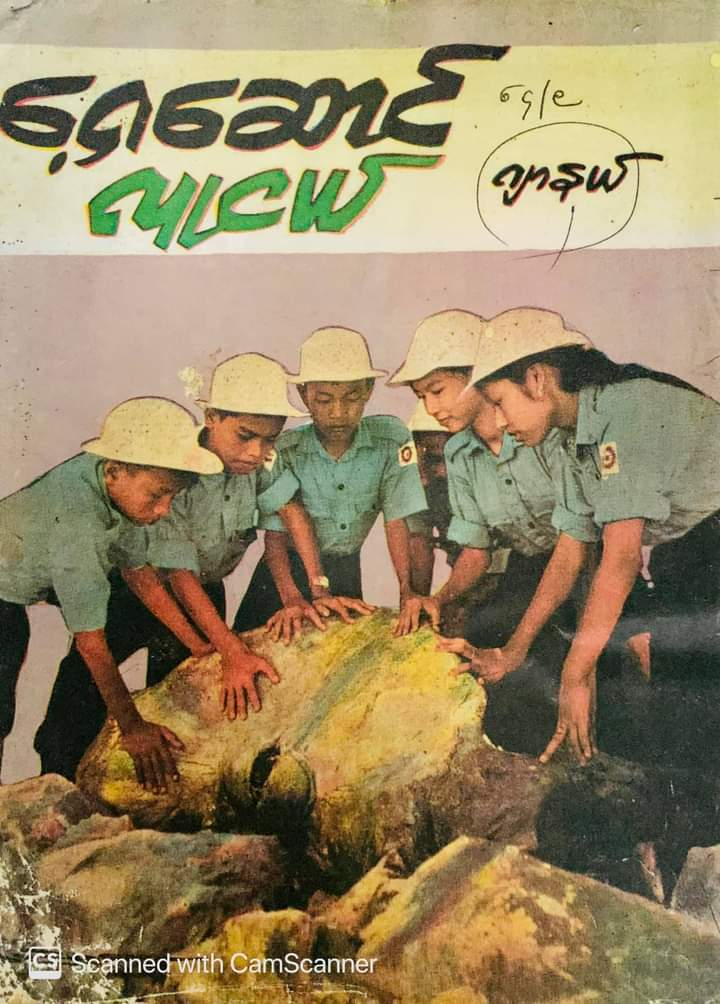
Cover of Pioneer Youth Journal 1964 September

The Revolutionary Government of the Union of Burma dissolved the Union of Burma Boy Scouts and Girl Guides (UBBSGG), Lieutenant (Note: This is Scout Lieutenant, not military one. Burmese/Myanmar senior scouts wear rank insignia. http://www.mdn.gov.mm/my/kngtheaakchiusnnymaakhengcnyphng-ckaawiung-kngp) Ye Htoon, the Director General of the UBBSGG, reported on 1 March 1964. The Revolutionary Government had seized the UBBSGG and its assets were turned over to the Ministry of Education, which was authorized to form the Lanzin Youth Organization (Programme Youth Organization).

== Structure ==
Students were required to join the organisation.

Within the organization of Lanzin Youth Organization, လမ်းစဉ်လူငယ်အဖွဲ့ (Programme Youth Organization), three branches were formed according to age:

1. Teza Youth, တေဇလူငယ် (Glorious Youth) for primary school students (5–9 years old),
2. Shehsaung Youth, ရှေ့ဆောင်လူငယ် (Pioneer Youth) for middle and high school students and other teens of 10–15 years old, and
3. Lanzin Youth, လမ်းစဉ်လူငယ် (Programme Youth) for college or university students and other youths of age of 16–25 years old.

After reaching the age of 18, a member could become a "candidate member of the party" (အရန်ပါတီဝင်). Then, starting at the age of 21 years old, a candidate member could apply to become a "fully-fledged party member" (တင်းပြည့်ပါတီဝင်).

In 1981, only 6.19% of members of Programme Youth Organization who had reached the age of 18 or above joined the Burma Socialist Programme Party. Thus, to persuade more youths to join the organization and the party, Programme Youth Organizing Committees were opened on the campuses of universities, institutes, and colleges.

== Teza Youth (Aung San Youth) ==
Teza Youth တေဇလူငယ်
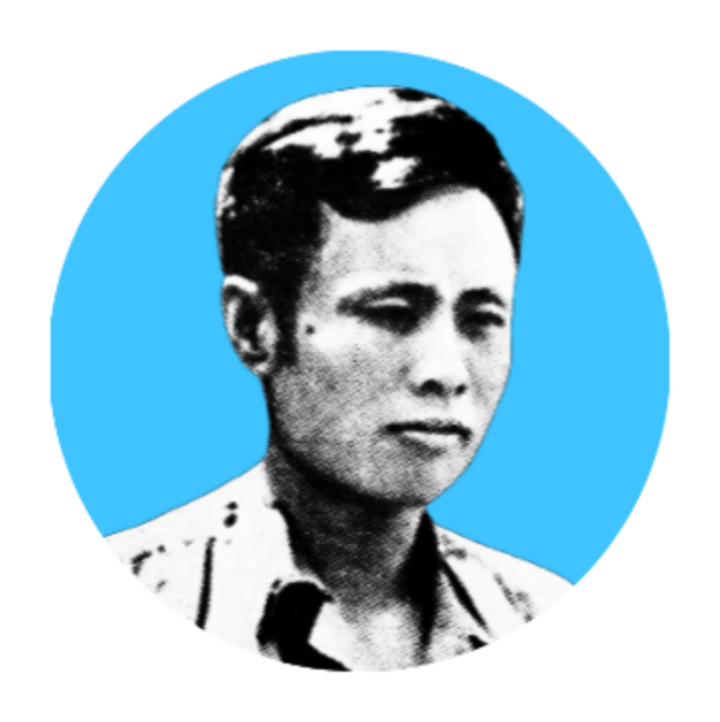
- badge and pin badge

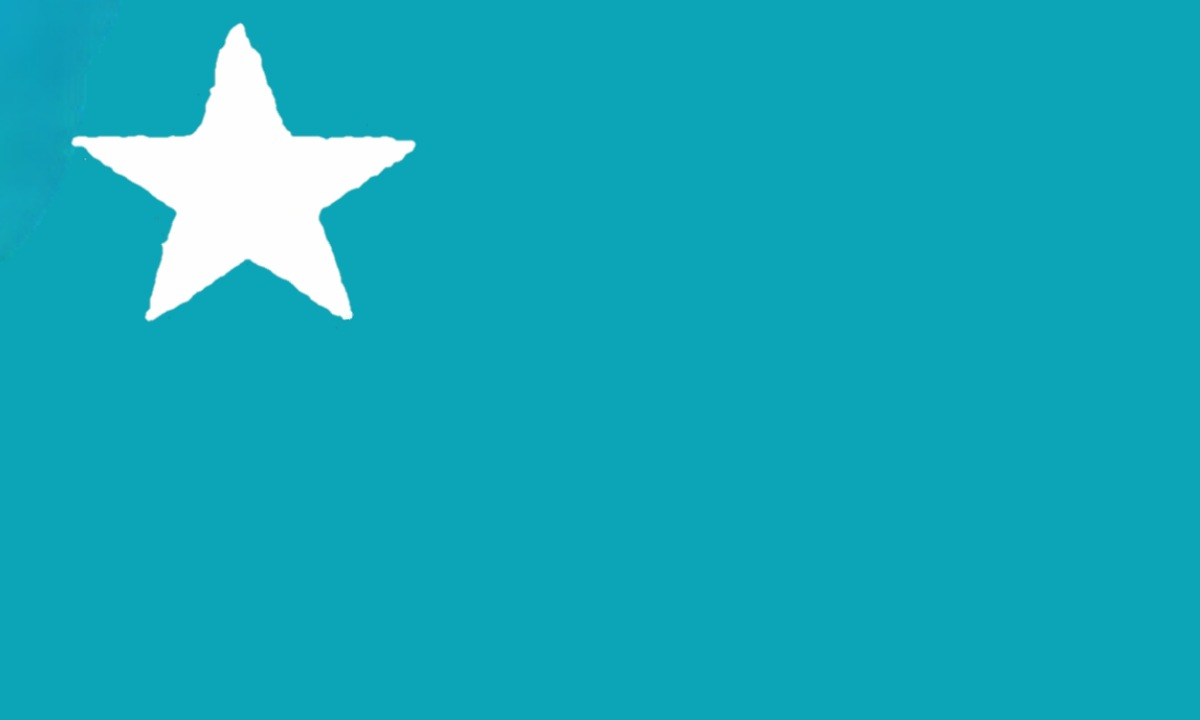
- flag
- Founded: 1964
- Dissolved: 1988
- Membership: 1,866,738 (1979)
- Ideology: Socialist Education
- Mother party: Programme Youth Organization

=== Origin of name ===
Named after General Aung San's Nom de guerre ဗိုလ်တေဇ(Bo Teza)

=== Membership age group ===
5 to 10 years old

=== Uniform ===
Normal uniforms of Teza Youth
Gender	Style 1	Style 2
Male	• white cap with white stripes and red badge • blue scarf • white shirt with red arm badges • black belt • blue long trousers	• white cap with white stripes and red badge • blue scarf • white shirt (school uniform) • green pa-hso (school uniform)
Female	• white cap with white stripes and red badge • blue scarf • white blouse with red arm badges • black belt • blue short skirt • white knee highs	• white cap with white stripes and red badge • blue scarf • white Burmese blouse (school uniform) • green hat-mein (school uniform)
References		

=== Badge ===
A cropped picture of General Aung San was used as a badge.

- To become heroic good sons and good daughters of the nation as General Aung San did.
- To continue the programme that General Aung San planned.

=== Flag ===
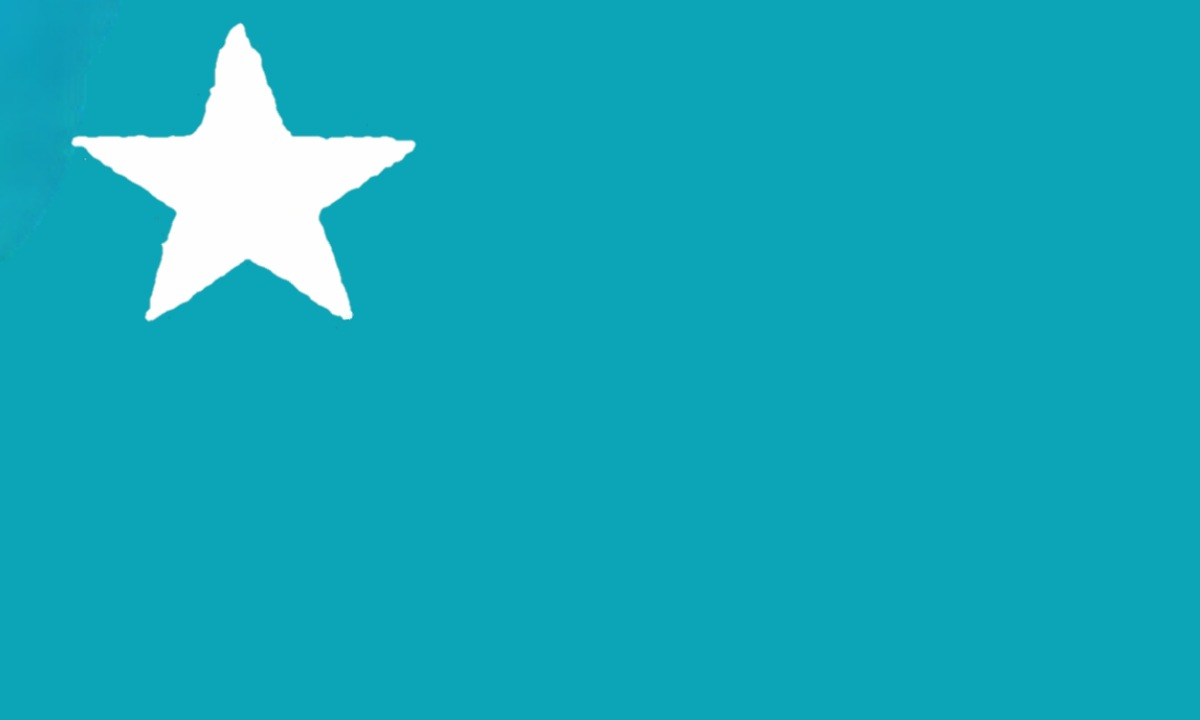

The flag must have a length of 5 ft and width of 3 ft, sky blue background with a big white star on upper left.

- The white star indicates the meaning of forever shining and forever preserving the independence
- The blue background indicates the meaning of steadfastness, peacefulness and pleasurability.

== Shehsaung Youth (Pioneer Youth) ==
Pioneer Youth ရှေ့ဆောင်လူငယ်
- badge and pin badge
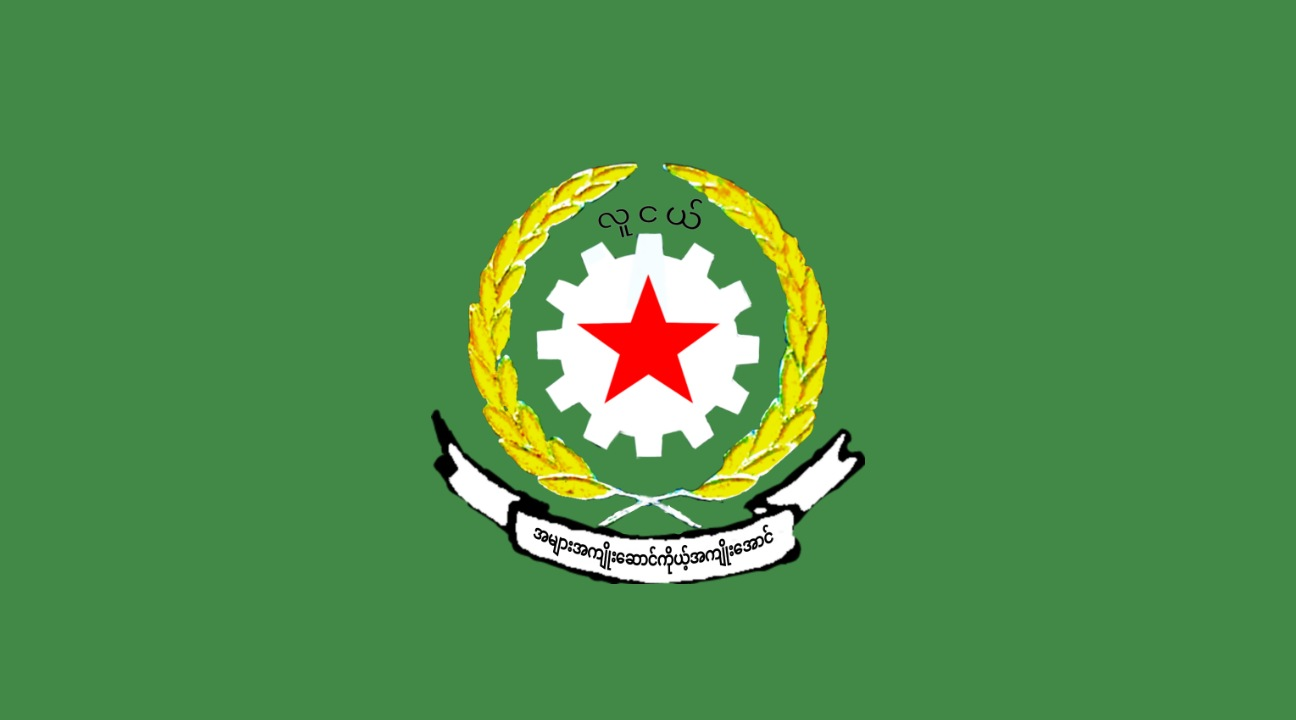
- flag
- Founded: 1964
- Dissolved: 1988
- Membership: 224,496 (1979)
- Ideology: Socialist Education
- Mother party: Programme Youth Organization

=== Origin of name ===
Named as a pioneer movement

=== Membership age group ===
11 to 15 years old

=== Uniform ===
Normal uniforms of Pioneer Youth
Gender	Style 1	Style 2
Male	• white cap • blue shirt with arm badges • black trousers	• blue cap with white stripes and badge • red scarf • white shirt (school uniform) • green pa-hso (school uniform)
Female	• white cap with badge • blue shirt with arm badges • black skirt	• blue cap with white stripes and badge • red scarf • white Burmese blouse (school uniform) • green hat-mein (school uniform)
References		

== Lanzin Youth (Programme Youth) ==
Programme Youth လမ်းစဉ်လူငယ်
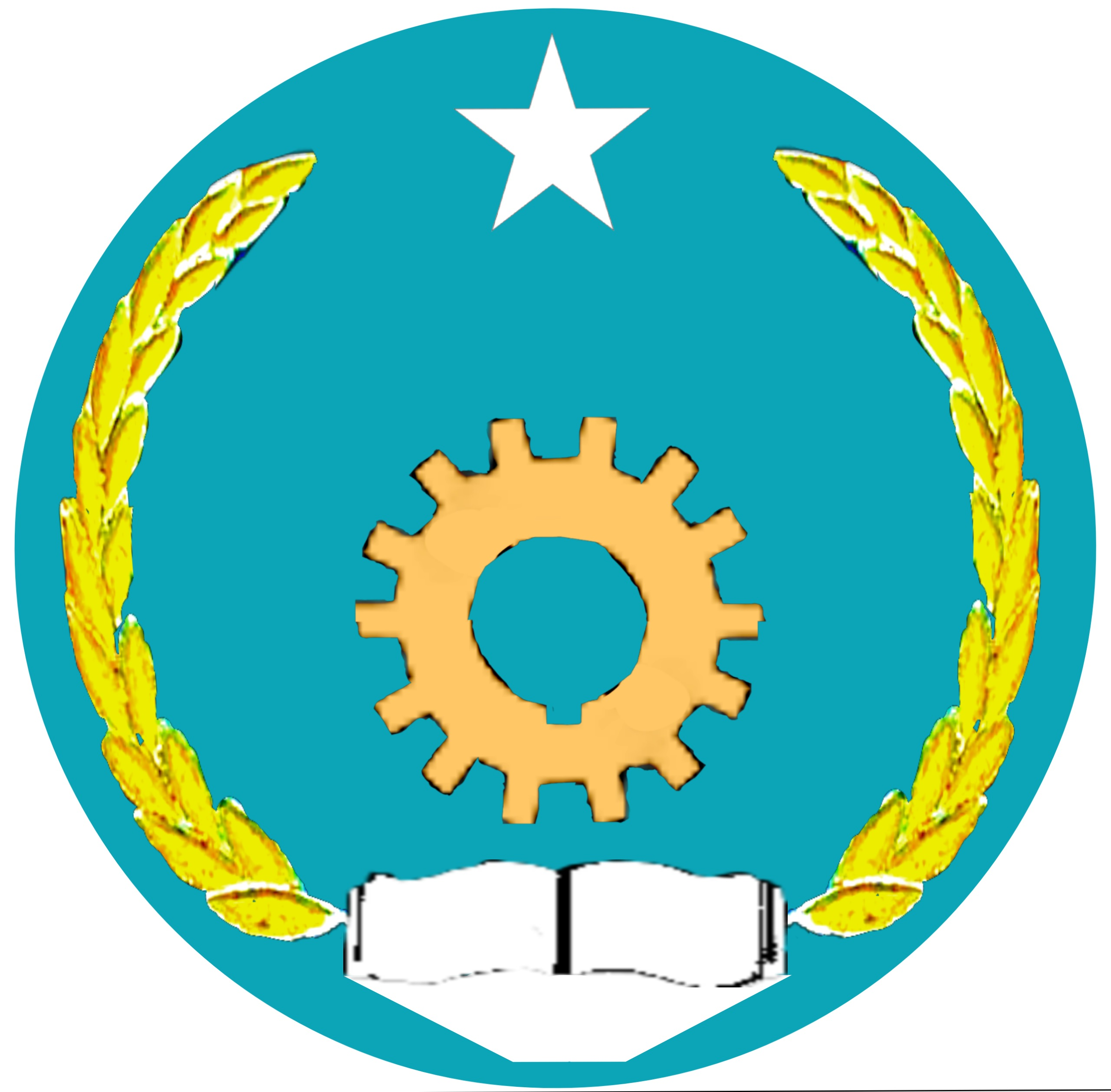
- badge and pin badge

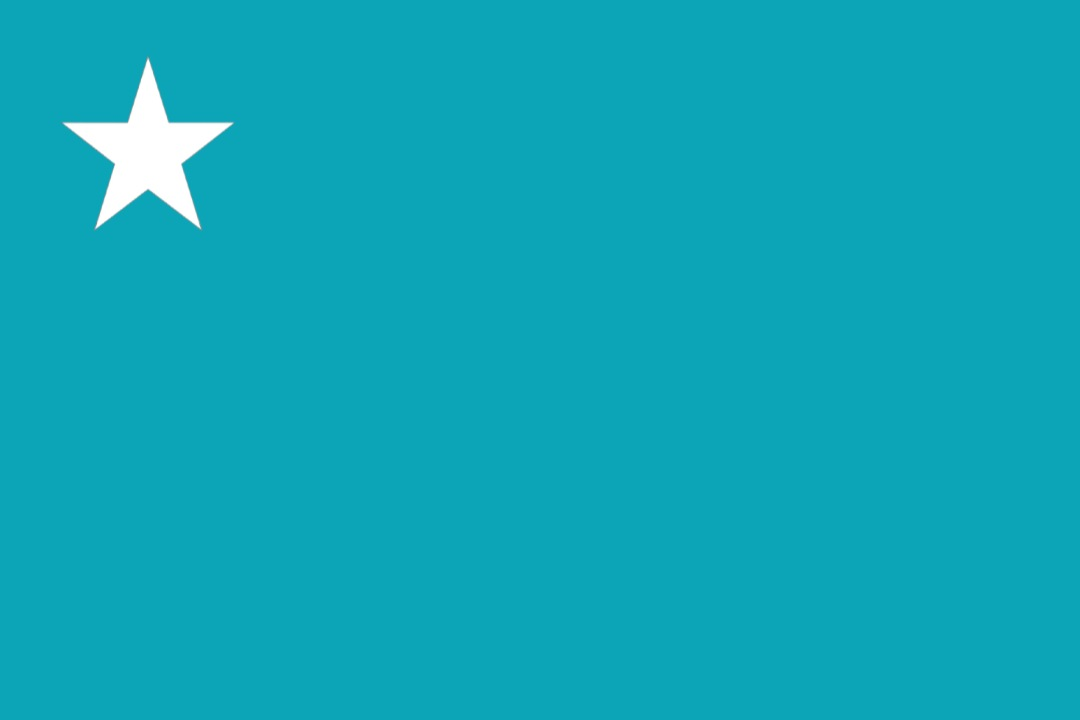
- flag
- Founded: 1964
- Dissolved: 1988
- Membership: 784,266 (1979)
- Ideology: Socialist Education
- Mother party: Programme Youth Organization

=== Origin of name ===
Named after short name of Burma Socialist Programme Party လမ်းစဉ်ပါတီ(Lanzin Party)

=== Membership age group ===
16 to 25 years old

=== Uniform ===
Normal uniforms of Lanzin Youth
Gender	Style 1	Style 2
Male	• blue cap with white stripes and badge • white shirt with arm badges • black belt • blue long trousers	?
Female	• blue cap with white stripes and badge • white blouse with arm badges • black belt • blue long skirt • white shoes	• blue cap with white stripes and badge • white Burmese blouse with arm badges • blue hat-mein
References		

== Other branches ==
- Lanzin Youth Organizing Committees
- Lanzin Youth Orchestras
- Lanzin Youth Leaders' Training Camps

== Legacy ==
According to the Political Pension Law of 1980, those who served in the Lanzin Youth Organizing Central Committee as chairman, vice-chairman, secretary, associate secretary, and committee member (full time) are to receive political pensions according to their positions.

The Programme Youth Organization with all its subordinate structures were effectively dissolved during the 1988 civil unrest. The Burma Socialist Programme Party renamed itself the National Unity Party on 24 September 1988.

The Government of the Republic of the Union of Myanmar ordered the Ministry of Education to found the Myanmar Scouts Association in 2012, and students' Scouts Associations were founded in 20 schools as of December 2020.
