= 1974 Burmese general election =

- 27 January–10 February 1974

All 451 seats in the People's Assembly
- Turnout: 94.61%
	First party
Leader	Ne Win
Party	BSPP
Leader since	4 July 1962
Seats won	451
Chairman before election
Ne Win
BSPP/Military
President
Ne Win
BSPP

General elections were held in Burma between 27 January and 10 February 1974. They were the first elections held under the new constitution, which had been approved in a referendum the previous year. This had made the country a one-party state with the Burma Socialist Programme Party (BSPP) as the sole legal party. The BSPP won all 451 seats in the People's Assembly. Voter turnout was reported to be 94.6%.

== Results ==
Party	Votes	%	Seats
Burma Socialist Programme Party			451
Total			451
Total votes	10,608,267	–	
Registered voters/turnout	11,212,197	94.61	
Source: Nohlen et al.
