= Council of State (Myanmar) =

Administrative body of the Socialist Republic of the Union of Burma

- နိုင်ငံတော်ကောင်စီ
- State Seal
- Predecessor: Revolutionary Council of the Union of Burma
- Successor: State Law and Order Restoration Council
- Formation: 3 March 1974
- Dissolved: 18 September 1988
- Type: Central Office
- Headquarters: Rangoon
- Location: Socialist Republic of the Union of Burma
- Affiliations: Burma Socialist Programme Party

The Council of State (Burmese: နိုင်ငံတော်ကောင်စီ [nàɪɰ̃ŋàɰ̃dɔ̀ kaʊ̀ɰ̃sì]) was the constitutional authority of the Socialist Republic of the Union of Burma. It was exercised as quasi-legislative power and supreme administrative power. This council was formed in accordance with Chapter 5 of the 1974 Constitution. According to the Constitution, the Pyithu Hluttaw, the highest organ of State Power, shall elect the council to carry out the decisions and policies of the Pyithu Hluttaw. The Chairman of the council shall be the President of the Republic, and the office of the President shall be the same as that of the Council of State. According to the Council of State Law, the President is the head of state, and as head of state, the President represents Myanmar both domestically and internationally.

The council is composed of 29 members. Due to the one-party system, all members of the State Council are members of the Burma Socialist Programme Party (BSPP), founded by Ne Win. Regardless of the constitution, the highest authority remains in the hands of party chairman Ne Win. After retiring as president and chairman of the council, Ne Win remained chairman of the party and supreme leader of the state, managing the country's affairs. On 18 September 1988, the Tatmadaw seized power in the military coup and founded the State Law and Order Restoration Council, dissolving the state organs (Note: The state organs of the Socialist Republic of the Union of Burma were: 1. the Pyithu Hluttaw; 2. the Council of State; 3. the Council of Ministers; 4. the Council of People's Justices; 5. the Council of People's Attorneys; 6. the Council of People's Inspectors; 7. the People Councils of States/Divisions; 8. the People Councils of Townships; 9. the People Councils of Wards/Villages) including the Council of State.

== Structure ==
According to the constitution, the council shall be composed of 29 members. 14 members are elected by the MPs of Pyithu Hluttaw by respective states and divisions. Another 14 members are elected by Pyithu Hluttaw, and the last member is the Prime Minister from the Council of Ministers, the highest executive organ of the State. The elected council members elect their chairman and secretary and obtain the approval of the Pyithu Hluttaw. The chairman shall be the President of the Republic. The Council of State is designed to represent all states and divisions.

The Prime Minister is appointed as a member of the Council of State to facilitate communication between the Council of Ministers (Cabinet) and the Council of State so that the Council of Ministers can comply with the decisions made by the State Council.

== Term of office ==
The term of the Council of State is the same as that of the Pyithu Hluttaw, and the term of the President is the same as that of the Council. The Council of State shall, on the expiry of the Pyithu Hluttaw, continue to perform its duties and functions until a new Council of State has been duly elected and constituted.

== Duties, powers and responsibilities ==
The Council of State must report to Pyithu Hluttaw. If it is necessary for a meeting of the Pyithu Hluttaw to take place, it may convene in consultation with the Speaker of the Hluttaw and promulgate laws enacted and rules made by the Pyithu Hluttaw. The chairman of the Council shall sign the laws, rules, and resolutions passed by the Pyithu Hluttaw as well as the orders promulgated by the Council of State. These shall be promulgated in the official Gazette.

The Council of State shall submit the candidates from among the members of Pyithu Hluttaw to the Pyithu Hluttaw to elect to the Council of Ministers, Council of People's Justices, Council of People's Attorneys and Council of People's Inspectors.

The Council of State shall submit the candidates from among the members of Pyithu Hluttaw to enable the Pyithu Hluttaw to elect Affairs Committees of Pyithu Hluttaw.

International treaties can be carried out with the consent of the Hluttaw. If it is invaded by foreign countries, it can report to the Pyithu Hluttaw and take military action as necessary. A state of emergency can be declared in the country if necessary. If elections are not held for any reason, the term of the Pyithu Hluttaw and People's Council may be extended three times in six months.

The Council of the State can appoint or remove deputy ministers and heads of Bodies of Public Services.

== List of chairmen ==
- Ne Win
- San Yu
- Sein Lwin
- Maung Maung
