= Chan Htoon =

Burmese lawyer, judge and Buddhist scholar

Thado Maha Thray Sithu Chan Htoon
- ချန်ထွန်း
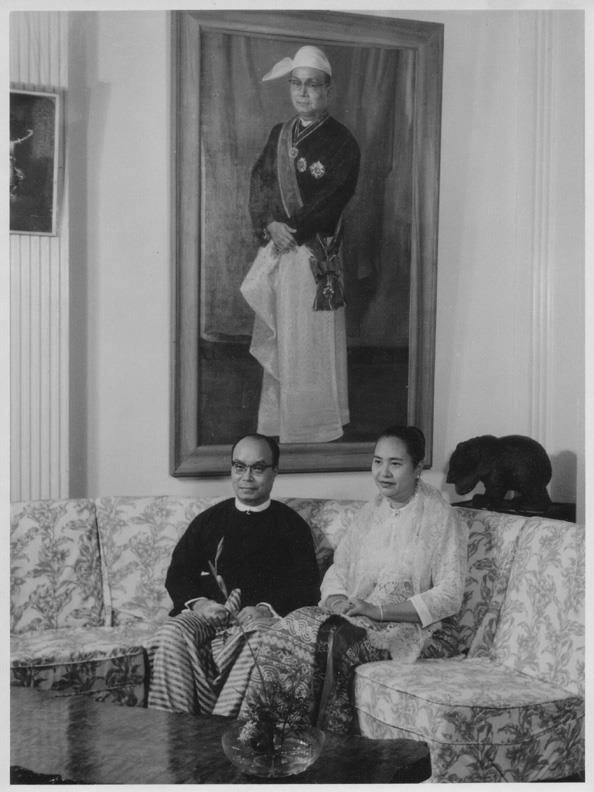
- Born: 23 April 1906
- Died: 16 May 1988 (aged 82)
- Education: Ananda College; University College, Rangoon
- Occupations: Lawyer, Judge
- Known for: Architect of the 1947 Constitution of Burma
- Spouse: Khin Khin Thein
- Children: 8, including Ye Htoon

Justice Chan Htoon (ချန်ထွန်း, pronounced [tɕʰáɰ̃ tʰʊ́ɰ̃]; 23 April 1906 – 16 May 1988) was Attorney General and Associate Justice of the Supreme Court of Burma, and the architect of the first constitution of Burma in 1947. He was educated at Ananda College in Ceylon (now Sri Lanka), where he passed matriculation in 1928. Afterward, he studied at the University College, Rangoon and became a lawyer in 1931, after he was called to the Bar by the Inner Temple. Chan Htoon served as the President of the World Fellowship of Buddhists from 1958 to 1963. He was imprisoned from 1963 to 1967 by the Burmese military government. After his release he devoted the rest of his life to Buddhism including supporting the task of translating into English texts from Pali, which is the language of the Buddhist Pāli Canon or Tipiṭaka.

He was married to Khin Khin Thein and had eight children, including Ye Htoon.
