= 1978 Burmese general election =

- 1–15 January 1978

All 464 seats in the People's Assembly
- Turnout: 93.3%
	First party
Leader	Ne Win
Party	BSPP
Leader since	4 July 1962
Seats won	464
Seat change	▲13
President before election
Ne Win
BSPP
President
Ne Win
BSPP

General elections were held in Burma between 1 and 15 January 1978. The country was a one-party state at the time, with the Burma Socialist Programme Party as the sole legal party. It therefore won all 464 seats in People's Assembly. Voter turnout was reported to be 93.3%.

== Results ==
Party	Votes	%	Seats	+/–
Burma Socialist Programme Party			464	+13
Total			464	+13
Total votes	14,000,000	–		
Registered voters/turnout	15,000,000	93.33		
Source: Nohlen et al.
