= February 1974 general election =

February 1974 general election may refer to:

- 1974 Burmese general election
- 1974 Liechtenstein general election
- February 1974 United Kingdom general election
