= 1981 Burmese general election =

- 4–18 October 1981

All 475 seats in the People's Assembly
- Turnout: 94.6%
	First party
Leader	Ne Win
Party	BSPP
Leader since	4 July 1962
Seats won	475
Seat change	▲12
President before election
Ne Win
BSPP
President
San Yu
BSPP

General elections were held in Burma between 4 and 18 October 1981. The country was a one-party state at the time, with the Burma Socialist Programme Party as the sole legal party. It therefore won all 475 seats in People's Assembly.

== Results ==
Party	Votes	%	Seats	+/–
Burma Socialist Programme Party			475	+12
Total			475	+12
Total votes	15,800,000	–		
Registered voters/turnout	16,740,000	94.38		
Source: Nohlen et al.
