= Tan Yu Sai =

Burmese politician

- တန်ယုဆိုင်

Minister of Trade

Member of the Union Revolutionary Council
- In office 2 March 1962 – 6 October 1970

Personal details
- Born: Yangon, Myanmar
- Spouse: Hla Hla

Military service
- Branch/service: Burmese Army
- Rank: Colonel

Tan Yu Sai (Burmese: တန်ယုဆိုင်; Chinese: 陳裕才; Pe̍h-ōe-jī: Tân Lū-châi; also spelt Tan Yu Saing) was a Burmese government official prominent during the Burmese Socialist Programme Party era. He served as one of the founding members of the Union Revolutionary Council from 2 March 1962 to 6 October 1970, and also a Minister for Trade. Tan Yu Sai was a Sino-Burmese. He was a brother-in-law of Ne Win's protege, Brigadier Tin Pe, who was married to Tan's sister, Thein Saing. Tan was married to Hla Hla.
