= Myanmar Scouts Association =

National Scouting organization in Myanmar

Myanmar Scout Association
- Official Emblem of Myanmar Scouts
- Owner: The National Scout Central Committee of Myanmar
- Location: Yangon
- Country: Myanmar
- Founded: 2012
- Membership: 21,007 (in 2019)
- Affiliation: World Organization of the Scout Movement
- Website www.facebook.com/myanmarscouts

The Myanmar Scout Association (formerly known as the Union of Burma Boy Scouts) is the national Scouting organization in Myanmar. Scouting in Myanmar was started in 1916 and disbanded in 1964 due to country's political changes; the current organization was formed in 2012 under the direct command of former President Thein Sein and supported by the Ministry of Education of Myanmar and became a member of the World Organization of the Scout Movement on 11 August 2016. It has about 21,007 members.

== History ==
Scouting was founded in Burma as part of the British Indian branch of The Scout Association during the colonial period, introduced in 1910 for British dependents. By 1913, Lone Scouts were found in Burma. Later, Scouting was opened to the Burmese. In 1922, Burmese Scouting became a separate branch of the British headquarters in London, but shared the same Chief Scout as India, the Viceroy. In the Burmese language, the Burmese Scouts were known as ကင်းထောက်မောင် (IPA: [kɪ́ɰ̃daʊʔ màʊɰ̃]) while the Girl Guides were known as ကင်းထောက်မယ် ([kɪ́ɰ̃daʊʔ mɛ̀]).

=== World War II ===
In Hilary Saint George Saunders' The Left Handshake, written in 1948:

In Burma, organized Scouting did not survive the advent of the Japanese. Before and during the period of the invasion, Scouting was going on steadily, and in the large towns they were trained to help in air-raid precaution work, a Scouter from Burma wrote to the Chief Scout early in 1940. "Should war come our way, we cannot hope for better than we will do our part as well as the best at home are doing theirs." When the time came, the Scouts had very little chance, though they did what they could before war dispersed them. They trained well and thoroughly in all A.R.P. work, each Scout being careful to know his own area intimately. So useful were they that, as the Burmese Scouts left school, they were absorbed into the Auxiliary Fire Service, where they were allowed to wear Scout badges and scarves in addition to their A.R.P. uniform. The last gathering of Scouts, most of whom were wearing it, took place on 10 January 1942, at Lanmadaw in Rangoon. By then they had already proved their mettle in the two great raids made by the Japanese against the city during the previous month. Of all the Rangoon Troops who helped to mitigate their effect, the 51st Kandawgalay took pride of place, not only for the number of Scouts belonging to it engaged in National Service, but also because of their great devotion to duty in time of danger. When the Auxiliary Fire Service left Rangoon with the retreating army, the Scouts went with them and moved successively to Mandalay, Maymyo and Shwebo. Most of them went farther and under their officers tramped the long road through the Naga Hills to Imphal and on to Assam and India. There some of them joined the Burmese Navy.

=== Postwar Scouting ===
Union of Burma Boy Scouts
- The Burmese national Scout emblem prior to disbandment-the red devices in the center are Burmese artistic form of lions. The text on the scroll reads "Scouts" (kindauk) in Burmese. After reintroducing of Scouting in Myanmar in 2012, the National Scout Council of Myanmar decided to re-use the emblem that used before the disbandment as an official branding of Myanmar Scout.
- Location: Yangon
- Country: Myanmar
- Founded: 1922; 1948
- Defunct: 1964

Upon independence, the Union of Burma Boy Scouts was recognized in the spring of 1948. It was one of the founding National Scout Organizations of the Far East Regional Scout Conference. Because of the war and its aftermath, Scouting had almost disappeared, but former Scouters and Old Scouts made strenuous efforts to revive it.

J. S. Wilson, Director of the Boy Scouts International Bureau, visited Burma in 1952. Wilson's sole journey outside Rangoon was to fly to Myaungmya in the Irrawaddy Delta. Scouting in that district was due to the enthusiasm of a Gurkha Preventive Officer, who formed all the official and influential men in the town into a Local Association. Many of those auxiliary leaders were given preliminary Scout training. Scouters and Guiders received more intensive training, while he apprenticed a successor as District Commissioner. Wilson met Bluebirds and Guides, Cubs and Scouts at a refugee village rapidly becoming a cooperative settlement; Guides and Scouts in their own locale; as well as a little band of Scouts in the compound of a Buddhist monastery across the river.

Burma sent a representative to the 1957 Far East Scouters' Regional Pow-Wow held at Sutton Park, England. By 1959 the nation counted 13,889 members, and the University of Rangoon in 1960 hosted the Second Far East Regional Scout Conference, with the First Far East Professional Scouters Training Conference held at Inyale Camp in Rangoon as an ancillary event. Tin Tun represented UBBS in the five-man Far East Scout Advisory Committee (FESAC). Burma's Ba Htay was elected one of the earliest chairmen of FESAC, which would later become the Asia-Pacific Region, and served from 1958 to 1960. Boy and Girl Scouts in Burma merged in 1962 to form the coeducational Union of Burma Boy Scouts and Girl Guides, which was active until 1964, reaching a membership high-point of 93,562.

Burmese Cub Scout badge

==== Youth program ====
Aside from the traditional UBBS scheme for training youth in patrols and troops, the visibility of Scouting in the urban and rural communities consisted of citywide Cleaning Week campaigns, "Safety-on-the-Road" services, and Cub Scout rallies at Rangoon's Inyale Training Center. Scouts' Day was celebrated every January 1 in Rangoon. In 1958, UBBS published the Handbook for Patrol Leaders in the Burmese language.

==== Adult training ====
The UBBS conducted a series of intensive training in the five regions of the country. In addition to the Cub Scout and Scout leaders' basic training courses, a Wood Badge course was conducted by John Thurman, Camp Chief of Gilwell Park in 1962.

==== Scout Motto ====
The Scout Motto was အစဉ်အသင့် [ʔəsʰɪ̀ɰ̃ʔəðɪ̰ɰ̃] asin athint, translated "Be Prepared".

==== Disbandment ====
Democratic rule ended in 1962 when General Ne Win led a military coup d'état. Almost all aspects of society (business, media, production) were nationalized or brought under government control (including the Boy Scouts). On 1 March 1964, the Union of Burma Revolutionary Council (the ruling military junta at the time) dissolved the UBBS, Lieutenant Ye Htoon, the Director General of UBBSGG reported. The assets of the association were turned over to the Ministry of Education, which was authorized to form its Lansin Lu-nge Aphwe (Programme Youth Organization), the youth wing of the Burma Socialist Programme Party. Girl Guiding was not immediately outlawed, and the standalone Union of Burma Girl Guides Association remained a member of the World Association of Girl Guides and Girl Scouts, and was last mentioned by WAGGGS in 1969. In the decades following, Scouting units existed underground and the firm believers of the Principles of Scouting continued the programme. This was evident when the regional team met old Scouts who continued the same Scouting methods. This is further manifested by the existence of their Scouting manuals, records and, uniform.

=== Re-establishment ===
During the administration of President Thein Sein, the Union Government of the Republic of the Union of Myanmar directed the Ministry of Education to reorganize the Scouting Movement in 2012. Under this directive, Scouting was reintroduced in 20 schools as of December 2012. In April 2013, the Union Government formed an ad hoc Central Committee of Myanmar Scouts, appointing Dr. Tin Nyo, former Director-General of the Ministry of Education, as Chairperson. The revival of Scouting in Myanmar took place in parallel with the nation’s transition toward democracy and was closely monitored by the World Organization of the Scout Movement (WOSM) and its Asia-Pacific Region (APR) Office. During a State Visit to Canberra, the President of Myanmar, His Excellency Mr. Thein Sein, conveyed to the Governor-General and Chief Scout of Australia his country’s desire to re-establish Scouting. The Asia-Pacific Region expressed readiness to assist, leading to a WOSM delegation visiting Myanmar from 17–18 May 2013 at the invitation of the Ministry of Education. The delegation was led by Dr. Chao Show-Po, Chairman of the Asia-Pacific Region, and included Reg Williams, Chief Commissioner of Scouts Australia, and Neville Tomkins, International Commissioner of Scouts Australia. The delegation met with current and former Scouts, senior officials of the Ministry of Education, and representatives of the YMCA. Myanmar (then known as Burma) had approximately 93,000 Scouts before the movement was dissolved on 1 March 1964. Under the guidance of President Thein Sein, school-based Scouting was reintroduced in November 2012, and by 2013, there were about 2,000 Scouts throughout the country with strong potential for further growth. These developments marked a historic step toward the full re-establishment of Scouting in Myanmar, leaving only five independent countries in the world without an active Scouting movement—namely the People’s Republic of China, North Korea, Cuba, Laos, and Andorra.

=== Post-Pandemic Movement ===
Scouting in Myanmar, like in many other countries, faced significant challenges during the COVID-19 pandemic. In post-COVID-19, the movement is gradually recovering from pandemic, but it still faces several challenges:

Challenges: Membership Decline: During the pandemic, many scouting activities were put on hold, leading to a decline in membership. Re-engaging former members and attracting new ones is a key focus area.

Financial Constraints: The pandemic strained the financial resources of many scouting organizations. This has impacted the ability to organize events, training, and other activities.

Political Instability: The ongoing political situation and humanitarian crisis in Myanmar adds an extra layer of difficulty in organizing and conducting scouting activities. This instability affects the safety and accessibility of scouting programs.

Suspension of Scouting Activities: Due to restriction on civil society especially upon uniformed youth movement in Myanmar, the potential risks of being associated with any form of dissent, scouting activities were effectively informally suspended. The environment made it difficult for the scouts to continue their work without risking the safety of their members. Although the National Scout Organization of Myanmar remains in touch with its global body the World Organization of the Scout Movement, the physical movement were unable to organize within the country. However, the WOSM acknowledged Myanmar Scout Association as a full-fledge member and regularly guiding and assessing the situation of the NSO Myanmar.

== Work at rebirth ==
According to Eric Khoo Heng-Pheng of the World Organization of the Scout Movement, "We hope to work on (Laos and Burma) again... Laos is the closest, as we have got Cambodia in already... Just like Vietnam... we are working with them through ASEAN Scouting. We hope to enroll all the countries including China in (the Asia-Pacific Scout Region)." Approval was given to restart December 25, 2012. Since the first visit of APR in 2012, the membership of Myanmar Scout had grown from 2,000 to approximately 25,000. The Myanmar government approved the legal registration and Constitution of Myanmar Scout. The Constitutions Committee, on behalf of the World Scout Committee, confirmed that all requirements of WOSM membership under Chapter III, Article V have been fulfilled.

== Motto and slogan ==
The motto of Myanmar scouts and girl guides is "အစဉ်အသင့်" (Be prepared) and their slogan is "ကောင်းမှုတစ်ခုနေ့စဉ်ပြု" (Do a good thing everyday).

== See also ==
- The Bharat Scouts and Guides
- Bangladesh Scouts
- Pakistan Boy Scouts Association
- Edward Michael Law-Yone
