= Tin Tun =

Burmese boxer and activist

Personal information
- Nationality: Burmese
- Born: November 20, 1944 (age 81) Rangoon, British Burma
- Weight: Featherweight

Boxing career

Tin Tun (Burmese: တင်ထွန်း, pronounced [tɪ̀ɰ̃ tʰʊ́ɰ̃]) (born 20 November 1944 in Rangoon) is a formerly jailed Burmese political dissident, Olympic boxer, and one of the pioneers of the now-extinct Scouting movement in that country, imprisoned under the Publishing and Printing Act in July 1993 for possessing a copy of the Khit Pyaing (New Era) Journal, a banned news magazine published by exiled activists.

Tin Tun represented the Union of Burma Boy Scouts in the five-man Far East Scout Advisory Committee (FESAC), which later became the Asia-Pacific Region.

Tin Tun represented Burma at the 1964 Summer Olympics in Tokyo and at the 1968 Summer Olympics in Mexico City.

== 1964 Olympic results ==
Below is the record of Tin Tun, a Burmese featherweight boxer who competed at the 1964 Tokyo Olympics:

- Round of 32: defeated Ronald Smith (Great Britain) referee stopped contest
- Round of 16: defeated Anthony Andeh (Nigeria) by decision, 4–1
- Quarterfinal: lost to Heinz Schulz (United German Team) by decision, 0–5

== 1968 Olympic results ==
Below is the record of Tin Tun, a Burmese lightweight boxer who competed at the 1968 Mexico City Olympics:

- Round of 64: bye
- Round of 32: Lost to Luis Minami (Peru) by a second-round knockout

== Political activities ==
According to the All Burma Students' Democratic Front, U Tin Tun bought a copy of Khit Pyaing, a banned political publication, for Ks.3,000/-, according to a close relative of Tin Tun, and was sentenced to 20 years imprisonment under two different charges of violating the Emergency Provision Act and the Publishing and Printing Act.

The State Law and Order Restoration Council (SLORC) transferred Tin Tun on Friday, 14 November 1997, from Insein Attached Jail (Special Jail) in Rangoon to Thayawaddy Prison in central Burma. The junta released Tin Tun from jail early in 2004. Tin Tun was not freed for completing his sentence, but released on health grounds and on the condition that serves the remainder of the sentence if he is jailed again for political or other offenses.

Tin Tun's son Phone Myint Tun, currently in Japan, told Democratic Voice of Burma (DVB) that his father is suffering from severe coronary atherosclerosis and could not even walk properly. Phone Myint Tun himself was jailed as a political prisoner from 1991 to 1995 and shared a cell with his father in jail.

== See also ==
- Ye Htoon
- Min Ko Naing
