= 1985 Burmese general election =

- 6–20 October 1985

All 489 seats in the People's Assembly
	First party
Leader	Ne Win
Party	BSPP
Leader since	4 July 1962
Seats won	489
Seat change	▲14
President before election
San Yu
BSPP
President
San Yu
BSPP

General elections were held in Burma between 6 and 20 October 1985. The country was a one-party state at the time, with the Burma Socialist Programme Party (BSPP) as the sole legal party. The BSPP won all 489 seats in the People's Assembly. The elections were the last to be held before the 8888 Uprising, the dissolution of the BSPP and the abolition of the People's Assembly.

== Results ==
Party	Seats	+/–
Burma Socialist Programme Party	489	+14
Total	489	+14
Source: Nohlen et al.
