= Bertil Lintner =

Swedish journalist, author and strategic consultant

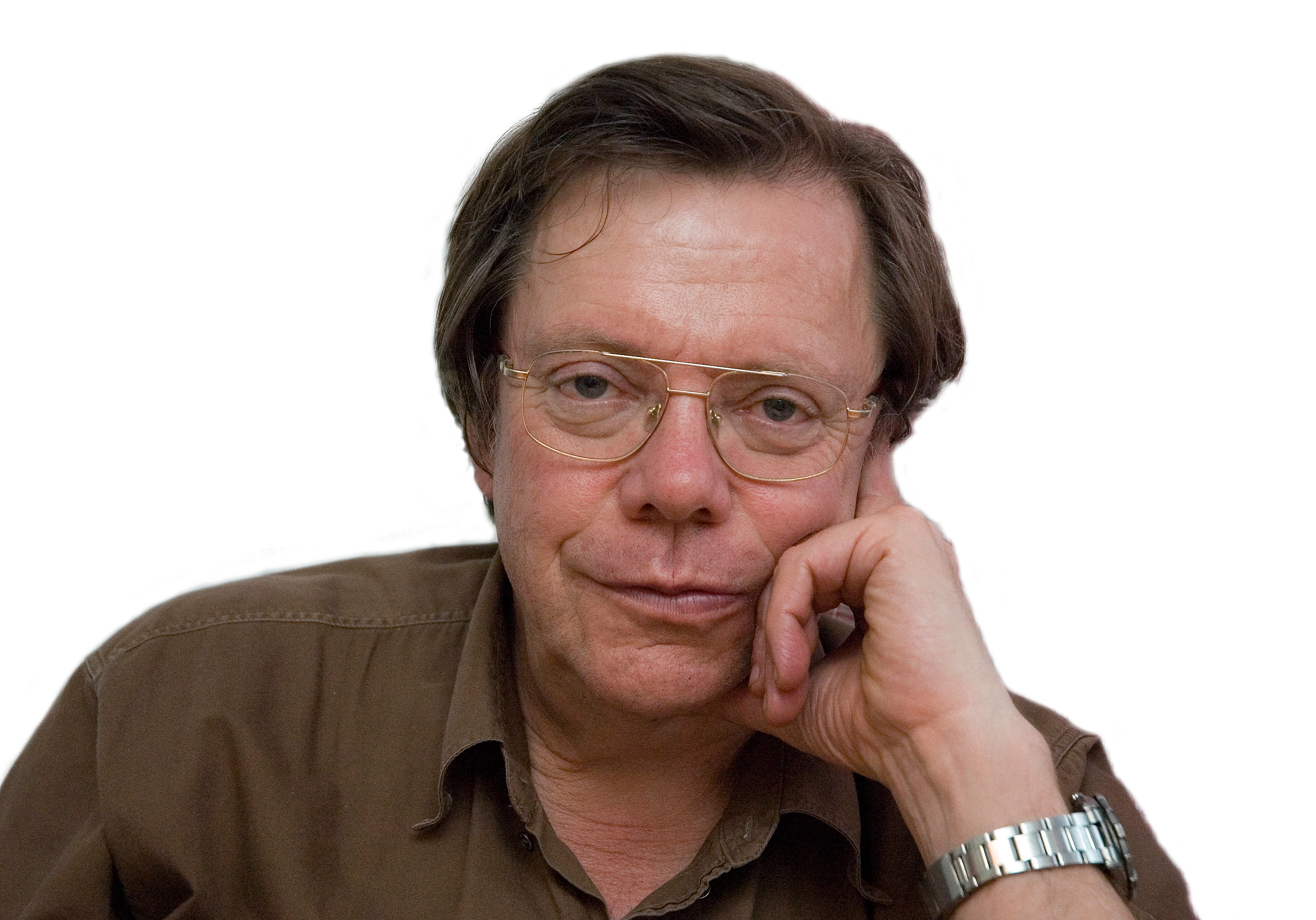
- Born: 1953 (age 72–73); Sweden
- Citizenship: Swedish
- Occupations: Journalist, Writer
- Known for: Expertise on Burmese issues
- Spouse: Hseng Noung
- Website: Asia Pacific Media Services

Bertil Lintner (born 1953) is a Swedish journalist, author and strategic consultant who has been writing about Asia for nearly four decades. He was formerly the Burma (Myanmar) correspondent of the now defunct Far Eastern Economic Review, and Asia correspondent for the Swedish daily Svenska Dagbladet and Denmark's Politiken. He currently works as a correspondent for Asia Times.

== Life and work ==
Bertil Lintner has written extensively about Myanmar (formerly known as Burma), India (with an emphasis on north east India), China and North Korea in various local, national and international publications of over thirty countries. He is considered to be the first journalist to reveal the growing relationship between Burma and North Korea on strategic cooperation. He mainly writes about organized crime, ethnic and political insurgencies, and regional security. He has published several books including, Aung San Suu Kyi and Burma's Struggle for Democracy, Blood Brothers: The Criminal Underworld of Asia, World.Wide.Web: Chinese Migration in the 21st Century—and How It will Change the World, and Great Leader, Dear Leader: Demystifying North Korea Under The Kim Clan.

Lintner was blacklisted by the Burmese military from the 1980s until the ban was lifted in 2012. Even so, Lintner was the first foreign journalist to learn about Aung San Suu Kyi's release from house arrest in 1995. Lintner continues to be interested in Burma where he also teaches investigative journalism to Burmese journalists.

Lintner lives in Chiang Mai, Thailand with his wife Hseng Noung, an ethnic Shan from Burma. They have a daughter who was born in Kohima, India, during their epic "18-month, 2,275-kilometer overland journey from northeastern India across Burma’s northern rebel-held areas to China" in 1985-87. They travelled by foot, jeep, bicycle, and elephant, among the rare handful of people to enter the isolated area, then controlled by various ethnic insurgents. This culminated in his second book, Land of Jade: A Journey from India through Northern Burma to China.

In 2004, Lintner received an award for excellence in reporting about North Korea from the Society of Publishers in Asia and, in 2014, another award from the same society for writing about religious conflicts in Burma. He is also the recipient of three writing grants from the John D. and Catherine T. MacArthur Foundation. He was the president of the Foreign Correspondents' Club of Thailand (FCCT) from 1993-95.

Lintner’s most recent book, The Costliest Pearl: China’s Struggle for India’s Ocean, was published in 2019 and covers geostrategic conflicts in the Indian Ocean.

== Books ==
- Outrage: Burma's Struggle for Democracy, Review Publishing, Hong Kong, 1989, and White Lotus, Bangkok, 1990.
- Land of Jade: A Journey from India through Northern Burma to China, First published in Kiscadale Publications in 1989, most recent edition by Orchid Press, Bangkok, 2011.
- The Rise and Fall of the Communist Party of Burma, Cornell University Southeast Asia Program Publications, Ithaca, 1990.
- The Kachin: Lords of Burma's Northern Frontier, Teak House Books, Chiang Mai, 1997.
- Burma in Revolt: Opium and Insurgency since 1948, Westview Press, Boulder, 1994, and Silkworm Books, Chiang Mai, 1999, 2003 and 2011.
- Blood Brothers: Crime, Business and Politics in Asia, Allen & Unwin, Sydney, 2002.
- Blood Brothers: The Criminal Underworld in Asia, Palgrave Macmillan, New York, 2003.
- Great Leader, Dear Leader : Demystifying North Korea Under the Kim Clan, Silkworm Books, Chiang Mai, 2005
- Merchants of Madness: The Methamphetamine Explosion in the Golden Triangle (coauthored with Michael Black), Silkworm Books, Chiang Mai, 2009.
- Aung San Suu Kyi and Burma’s Struggle for Democracy, Silkworm Books, Chiang Mai, 2011.
- World.Wide.Web: Chinese Migration in the 21st Century — and How It will Change the World, Orchid Press, Bangkok, 2011.
- Great Game East: India, China and the Struggle for Asia’s Most Volatile Frontier, Harper Collins, New Delhi, 2012, and Yale University Press, New Haven, 2015.
- China's India War: Collision Course on the Roof of the World, Oxford University Press, New Delhi, 2018.
- The Costliest Pearl: China’s Struggle for India’s Ocean, Hurst & Company, London, 2019, and Westland Publications, India, 2019.

== See also ==
- Ye Htoon
- John McBeth
