= Myanmar Girl Guides =

Youth organization

- The Girl Guides badge featured the peacock. The Burmese Scout motto "အစဉ်အသင့်" (asin athint [ʔəsʰɪ̀ɰ̃ʔəðɪ̰ɰ̃]) translated "Always Prepared" is written below.
- Founded: 2014
- Membership: 29,067
- Affiliation: World Association of Girl Guides and Girl Scouts

Myanmar Girl Guides is the national Guiding organization of Myanmar. The organization was founded in 2014 and is currently an associate member of the World Association of Girl Guides and Girl Scouts. It serves 29,067 members (as of 2014).

== History ==
Union of Burma Girl Guides Association
- The Girl Guides badge featured the peacock, a prominent symbol of Burma, and read အဆင်သင့် asinthint [ʔəsʰɪ̀ɰ̃ðɪ̰ɰ̃], the Scout Motto, translated "Be Prepared"
- Defunct: 1969?

The Union of Burma Girl Guides Association (Burmese: ပြည်ထောင်စု မြန်မာနိုင်ငံတော် ကင်းထောက်မယ်များ အသင်း) was the organization for Girl Guides in Burma. Boy Scouts and Girl Guides in Burma merged in 1962 to form the coeducational Union of Burma Boy Scouts and Girl Guides (UBBSGG), which was active until 1964, reaching a membership high-point of 93,562.

=== Uniform ===
The Girl Guide uniform consisted of a royal blue longyi, white blouse with royal blue buttons, a Guide company neckerchief in company colors, royal blue shoulder tabs, and for patrol leaders, royal blue stripes, completed with white slippers.

=== Disbandment ===
On March 1, 1964 the military government dissolved the Boy Scouts, Lieutenant Ye Htoon, the Director General of UBBSGG reported. The assets of the association were turned over to the Ministry of Education, which was authorized to form Programme Youth Organizations, the youth wing of the Burma Socialist Programme Party. Girl Guiding was not immediately outlawed, and the standalone Union of Burma Girl Guides Association remained a member of the World Association of Girl Guides and Girl Scouts, and was last mentioned by WAGGGS in 1969.

=== Legacy ===
Guiding traditions are still being passed down orally. An Australian Girl Guide leader says "I have warm memories of singing Kookaburra with some former Guides from Burma who were studying in Sydney - this was in about 1984 and Guiding was forbidden in Burma. The girls came to our Guide Unit's campfire at Glengarry in Sydney - the Guides were amazed that the Burmese students knew so many of the campfire songs that they also knew. The Burmese girls taught the Guides to sing Kookaburra in Burmese."

== Motto and slogan ==
The motto of Myanmar scouts and girl guides is "အစဉ်အသင့်" (Be prepared) and their slogan is "ကောင်းမှုတစ်ခုနေ့စဉ်ပြု" (Do a good thing everyday).
