= Ye Htoon =

Burmese lawyer, political dissident and entrepreneur

- ရဲထွန်
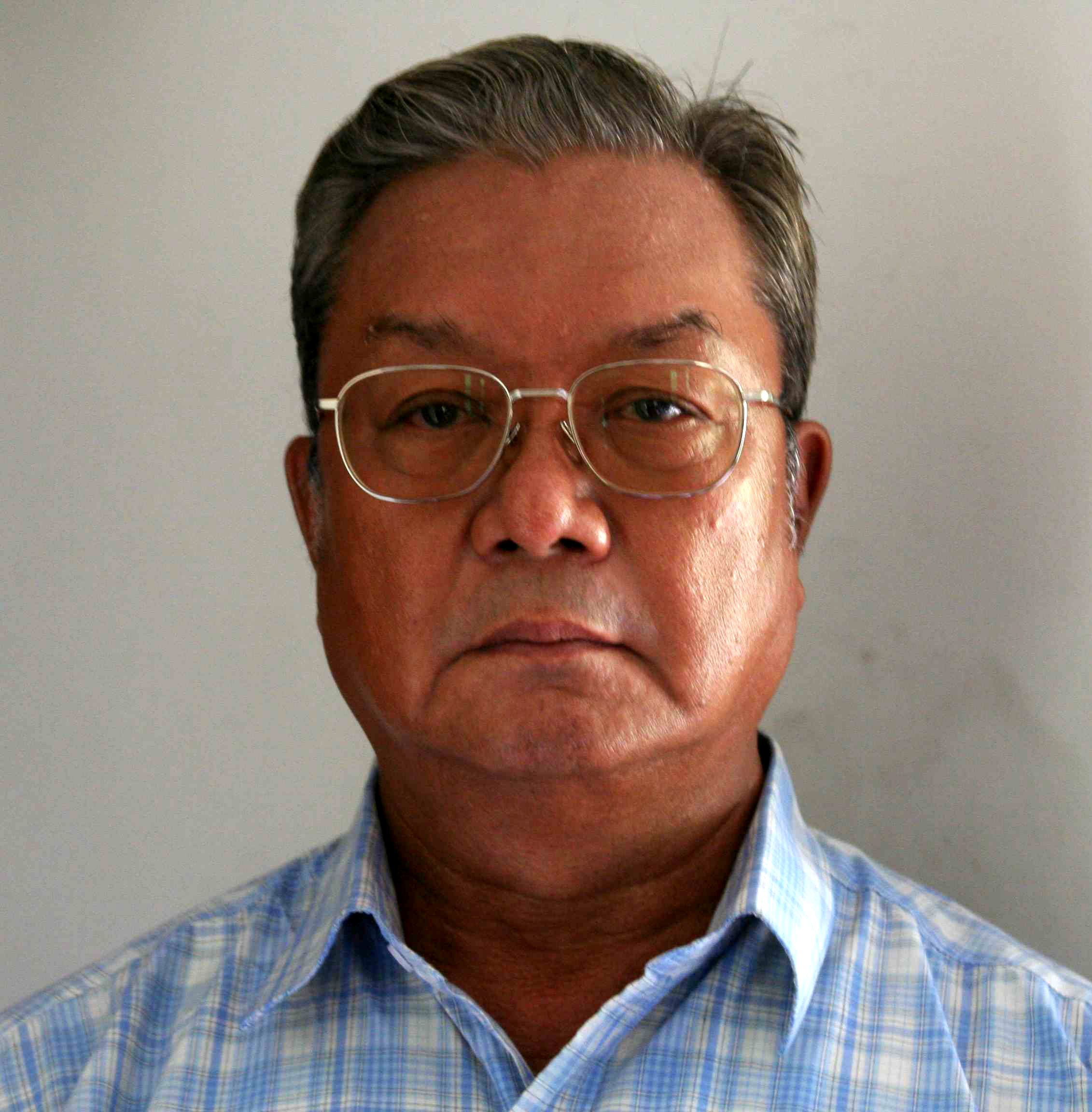
- Ye Htoon in 2007
- Born: 1937
- Died: 7 May 2010 (aged 72–73)
- Education: Bucknell University
- Occupations: lawyer, entrepreneur

Ye Htoon, (Burmese: ရဲထွန်း; pronounced [jɛ́ tʰʊ́ɰ̃]) also known as Roland Chan Htoon [tɕʰáɴ tʰʊ́ɴ], (1937 – 7 May 2010) was a prominent Burmese lawyer, sometime-jailed political dissident, a successful entrepreneur, and one of the notables of the now-extinct Scouting movement in Burma.

== Early life and education ==
Ye Htoon was the eldest son of Chan Htoon, former Attorney General and Associate Justice of the Supreme Court and the architect of the first constitution of Burma in 1947, and Khin Khin Thein. He attended Myoma National High School, Ananda College, Colombo, Sri Lanka and Thacher School, Ojai Valley, California, was a 1961 graduate of Bucknell University, and received a postgraduate Bachelor of Law degree from the Rangoon University in 1965. His wife Onma Maw was the daughter of the statesman Ba Maw, the first Prime Minister and the Head of State of Burma.

== Career ==
Ye Htoon served as the last Director General of the Union of Burma Boy Scouts and Girl Guides, and reported that the military government dissolved the Union of Burma Boy Scouts, on 1 March 1964.

He was under detention for the first time from 1962 to 1963 for alleged participation in the 7 July Upheaval. He was arrested again from November 1971 to July 1972 for his connection with Burmese expatriates and foreign firms, and action was taken against him the third time in January 1975 for participation in what has come to be known as the U Thant crisis, student-led protests over the shabby treatment by the Ne Win government of the remains of Burmese diplomat and UN secretary general U Thant which were crushed by the military government, when he was given a 10-year prison term. He was freed in July 1980 under the Government's Amnesty Order No. 2180. He was detained in June 1986, accused of involvement in illegal dollar transaction, but was freed two weeks later under a personal surety.

He was a pioneer in bringing digital switching telephone exchanges to Burma, and had amassed a vast experience with the country's economic system. A business consultant to many international companies, he was Chairman of Maw Htoon and Partners Co., Ltd., Shambhala Tours Co., Ltd., Shambhala Financial Services and the Myanmar Thai Gypsum Co., Ltd.

At a lengthy press conference on 9 September 1989, State Law and Order Restoration Council First Secretary Brigadier General Khin Nyunt stated, "Fifty-two persons including Ye Htoon, who were in charge of the underground youth organization and who were trying to cause unrest in the country, were interrogated, and consequently documentary and other evidence (was) seized... We received information that a person called Ye Htoon, resident at 5/A Po Sein Road, Bahann Township, had been in contact with an organization called 'Da Nya Ta' (Alliance for Democratic Solidarity, Union of Burma) led by Thanmani Bo Khin Maung, and was aiding and abetting that group's work from Yangon since. Information was also received that he had formed the underground youth organization called FFB (National Freedom Fighters of Burma) and was striving to cause unrest in the country under his supervision; the National Intelligence Bureau called in and interrogated 52 persons including Ye Htoon beginning 31 July 1989."

Ye Htoon was picked up, had his teeth kicked out and was sentenced to 19 years hard-labor rigorous imprisonment, for participating in the 1988 democratic uprising. The specific crime, according to the junta, was that he had met a Swedish journalist and author Bertil Lintner and provided him with information. He was also accused of being a ghostwriter for Outrage: Burma's Struggle for Democracy, a book authored by Lintner. He was imprisoned for four years, from 1989 to 1993.

Ye Htoon, as the leader of the Myanmar Mingala Foundation, appeared to be making preparations for the 2010 Burmese elections before his death.

== See also ==
- Min Ko Naing
- Tin Tun
