= Scouting and Guiding in Myanmar =

Scouting and Guiding organizations in Myanmar

Scouting and Guiding in Myanmar is served by:

- Myanmar Girl Guides, associate member of the World Association of Girl Guides and Girl Scouts.
- Myanmar Scout, member of the World Organization of the Scout Movement.

== International Scouting units in Burma ==
There are two organizations focused on serving children of American families living in Yangon: the USA Girl Scouts Overseas, serviced by way of USAGSO headquarters in New York City, and the Boy Scouts of America, serviced by the Direct Service branch of the Boy Scouts of America. These councils serve BSA and GSUSA units composed of children of diplomatic, business and military personnel, and international units run under their auspices.
