= David I. Steinberg =

American historian (1928–2024)

- Born: November 26, 1928; Cambridge, Massachusetts, U.S.
- Died: December 5, 2024 (aged 96); Bethesda, Maryland, U.S.
- Education: Dartmouth College, Harvard University, School of Oriental and African Studies, University of London

David Isaac Steinberg (November 26, 1928 – December 5, 2024) was an American historian and U.S. Foreign Service officer. Holding the title of Distinguished Professor of Asian Studies at Georgetown University, Steinberg specialised in Myanmar, the Korean Peninsula, Southeast Asia, and U.S. policy in Asia.

Steinberg was born in Cambridge, Massachusetts in 1928. He was a prolific author with 14 books and over 150 articles and book chapters to his name, in addition to approximately 300 op-eds. He received degrees from Dartmouth College, Lingnan University, Harvard University, and the School of Oriental and African Studies at the University of London.

As a member of the Senior Foreign Service at the U.S. Agency for International Development (USAID) within the Department of State, Steinberg served as the Director for Technical Assistance in Asia and the Middle East. He also held the position of Director for Philippines, Thailand, and Burma Affairs. During his time with USAID, he spent three years in Thailand at the Regional Development Office. Prior to his tenure at Georgetown, he held positions as a Representative of the Asia Foundation in Korea, Hong Kong, Burma, and Washington, D.C. Additionally, he served as the Distinguished Professor of Korean Studies at Georgetown University and as the President of the Mansfield Center for Pacific Affairs.

Steinberg died in Bethesda, Maryland on December 5, 2024, at the age of 96.

== Books ==
- Burma/Myanmar: What Everyone Needs to Know. New York: Oxford University Press, 2010.
- Turmoil in Burma; Contested Legitimacies in Myanmar. New York: Eastbridge, 2006.
- Stone Mirror. Reflections on Contemporary Korea. New York: Eastbridge, 2002.
- Burma: The State of Myanmar. Washington, D.C.: Georgetown University, 2001.
- The Future of Burma. Crisis and Choice in Myanmar. Asia Agenda Report #14. New York: The Asia Society & University Press of America, 1990.
- Crisis in Burma: Stasis and Change in a Policial Economy in Turmoil. Bangkok: Chulalongkorn University, 1989.
- The Republic of Korea. Economic Transformation and Social Change. Boulder: Westview Press, 1989.
- On Foreign Aid and the Development of the Republic of Korea, The Effectiveness of Concessional Assistance. Washington, D.C.: The World Bank, 1985.
- Irrigation and AID's Experience: A Consideration Based on Evaluations. Washington, D.C.: A.I.D. Program Evaluation Report #8, 1983.
- Burma. A Socialist Nation of Southeast Asia. Boulder: Westview Press, 1982.
- The Economic Development of Korea: Sui Generis or Generic?. Washington, D.C.: A.I.D. Special Study #6, 1982.
- Burma's Road Toward Development: Growth and Ideology Under Military Rule. Boulder: Westview Press, 1981.
- Korea: Nexus of East Asia. An Inquiry into Contemporary Korea in Historical Perspective. New York: American-Asian Educational Exchange, 1968.
- In This Earth and In That Wind: This is Korea. Seoul: Royal Asiatic Society, Korea Branch, 1967
