= 1973 Burmese constitutional referendum =

15 December 1973

Results
Choice	Votes	%
Yes	13,312,801	94.45%
No	781,559	5.55%

A constitutional referendum was held in Burma on 15 December 1973. The new constitution was approved by 94% of voters, with voter turnout reported to be 96%. The new constitution was adopted on 3 January 1974.

== Results ==
Choice	Votes	%
For	13,312,801	94.45
Against	781,559	5.55
Total	14,094,360	100.00
Registered voters/turnout	14,760,036	–
Source: Direct Democracy
