= Kandawgalay =

Ward in Yangon, Myanmar

Coordinates: 16°47′37″N 96°09′56″E

Kandawgalay (Burmese: ကန်တော်ကလေး; lit. "little lake") is a ward in Yangon, Burma located near Yangon Zoological Garden and the man-made, 150-acre, Kandawgyi Lake. Yangon Zoo located at Lake Road, Kandawgalay, Yangon.
