= Constitution of Myanmar =

Fundamental law of Myanmar

The Constitution of Myanmar is the supreme law of Myanmar. Before gaining independence, there had been two quasi-constitutions under British rule and Japanese occupation. Since it gained independence in 1948, Myanmar has had three constitutions, ten constitutional amendments, five temporary constitutional amendments, two extraconstitutional amendments and two periods without any constitution. The country has been ruled by military juntas for most of its history.

Myanmar's first constitution adopted by constituent assembly was enacted for the Union of Burma in 1947. After the 1962 Burmese coup d'état, the 1947 constitution was suspended and a second constitution was enacted in 1974 for the Socialist Republic of the Union of Burma, which was also suspended after the 1988 coup d'état.

The 2008 Constitution, the country's third constitution, was published in September 2008 after a referendum, and came into force on 31 January 2011, having been amended in 2015 and 2020. Under this current constitution, the Tatmadaw (Myanmar Armed Forces, officially the Defence Services) retain significant control of the government, even before their coup of 2021. Under the constitution, 25% of seats in the legislature, Pyidaungsu Hluttaw, were reserved for serving military officers. The ministries of Home Affairs, Border Affairs and Defence were headed by serving military officers who were appointed by the Commander-in-Chief of Defence Services. The military also appointed one of the country's two Vice Presidents. Hence, the country's civilian leaders have little influence over the security establishment.

== History ==
=== 1935 and 1943 quasi-constitutions ===
Before independence, Myanmar had two quasi-constitutions, "The Government of Burma Act, 1935" (under British rule) and "Constitution for Government of Burma, Act No. 1 of 1305 B.E." (1943, for State of Burma under Japanese occupation), which are recognized as the former constitutions. After independence, Myanmar adopted three constitutions: in 1947, 1974 and 2008. The 2008 constitution is the present constitution of Myanmar.

=== 1947 constitution ===
The Constitution of the Union of Burma
- Created: 1947
- Ratified: 24 September 1947
- Date effective: 4 January 1948
- Amended: Before effective date: December 1947 (extraconstitutional); 3 January 1948 (extraconstitutional); After effective date: 25 June 1949 (temporary); 23 February 1950 (temporary); 31 March 1951 (temporary); 24 March 1951 (temporary); 7 November 1951; 26 February 1959 (temporary); 17 March 1959; 24 March 1961; 25 March 1961; 26 August 1961; 28 September 1961
- Purpose: To serve as the constitution of the then-newly independent Burma

The 1947 constitution, officially the Constitution of the Union of Burma (ပြည်ထောင်စုမြန်မာနိုင်ငံတော် ၏ ဖွဲ့စည်းအုပ်ချုပ်ပုံအခြေခံဥပဒေ), was drafted and approved by the Constituent Assembly of Burma in 1947, and was used from the country's independence in 1948 until the military seizure of power during the 1962 military coup. This constitution was developed in consultation with different ethnic groups including the Chin, Kachin, and Shan people. In return, these groups were to receive full autonomy in internal matters. The constitution also granted the right for ethnic states to secede from the new Union of Burma if so desired after ten years following independence in 1948. The national government consisted of three branches: judicial, legislative and executive. The legislative branch was a bicameral legislature called the Union Parliament, consisting of two chambers, the 125-seat Chamber of Nationalities (လူမျိုးစုလွှတ်တော် Lumyozu Hluttaw) and the Chamber of Deputies (ပြည်သူ့လွှတ်တော် Pyithu Hluttaw), whose seat numbers were determined by the population size of respective constituencies. The 1947 constitution was largely based on the 1946 Yugoslav Constitution, as several Burmese officials had visited Yugoslavia earlier that year. Just as Yugoslavia at that time was a federation, so was Burma under the 1947 constitution. Despite this, the country was governed in practice like a unitary state, and not a federation. Other influences of the socialist Yugoslav constitution were the sections establishing a welfare state and codifying a heavily centralised government. The 1947 Constitution had eight amendments and five temporary amendments: six amendments and one temporary amendment by parliamentary legislation according to the Chapter XI (Articles 207 – 210), four temporary amendments by presidential orders according to the Article 230, one amendment by the authority of the constituent assembly president given by a proposal of the constituent assembly and one amendment by another proposal of the constituent assembly itself.

=== 1962–1974 ===
The 1947 constitution was suspended when the military seized power in 1962 and formed the Revolutionary Council of the Union of Burma, led by General Ne Win.

=== 1974 constitution ===
The Constitution of the Socialist Republic of the Union of Burma
- Created: 1973
- Ratified: 3 January 1974
- Date effective: 3 January 1974
- Amended: 18 March 1981; 29 March 1985
- Purpose: To replace the 1947 Constitution of the Union of Burma

The 1974 constitution, officially the Constitution of the Socialist Republic of the Union of Burma (ပြည်ထောင်စုဆိုရှယ်လစ်သမ္မတမြန်မာနိုင်ငံတော် ဖွဲ့စည်းပုံအခြေခံဥပဒေ), was the second constitution to be written, was approved in a 1973 referendum, and was adopted on 3 January 1974. It created a unicameral legislature called the Pyithu Hluttaw (People's Assembly), represented by members of the Burma Socialist Programme Party (BSPP) as the only legal party. Each term was 4 years. Ne Win became the president at this time.

According to David I. Steinberg, this constitution was modelled after the constitutions of the Eastern Bloc. Gone was the language of federation found in the 1947 constitution. In its place, the 1974 constitution codified a unitary, centralized state, under the complete control of the military, through the BSPP. "Even the modest autonomy previously granted the minorities was rescinded. The periphery was without effective voice. Although 'elected' representatives were obligated to return to their constituencies to learn the problems of their electorate, the system did not work, as fear prevented criticism of the military hierarchy and its policies and programs." The 1974 Constitution had been amended twice.

=== 1988–2008 ===
Upon taking power in September 1988, the military, under the guise of the State Law and Order Restoration Council (SLORC) suspended the 1974 constitution. In 1990, they issued a declaration stating that they are not observing any constitution at that time and that a new constitution should be drawn up. However, many viewed their abuse of the constitution-making process as simply a delaying tactic to remain in power. The SLORC called a constitutional convention in 1993, but it was suspended in 1996 when the National League for Democracy (NLD) boycotted it, calling it undemocratic. The constitutional convention was again called in 2004, but without the NLD. Myanmar remained without a constitution until 2008.

== 2008 constitution ==
The Constitution of the Republic of the Union of Myanmar (2008)
- Created: 9 April 2008
- Ratified: 29 May 2008
- Date effective: 31 January 2011
- Amended: 22 July 2015; 26 March 2020
- Purpose: To replace the 1974 Constitution of the Socialist Republic of the Union of Burma

The 2008 constitution, officially the Constitution of the Republic of the Union of Myanmar (2008) (ပြည်ထောင်စုသမ္မတမြန်မာနိုင်ငံတော် ဖွဲ့စည်းပုံအခြေခံဥပဒေ (၂၀၀၈ ခုနှစ်)) is the third and current constitution.

On 9 April 2008, the military government released its proposed constitution for the country to be put to a vote in public referendum on 10 May 2008, as part of its roadmap to democracy. The constitution is hailed by the military as heralding a return to democracy, but the opposition sees it as a tool for continuing military control of the country.

The legislative branch is the Pyidaungsu Hluttaw (ပြည်ထောင်စုလွှတ်တော်, Union Assembly), which is a bicameral legislature consisting of the 440-seat Pyithu Hluttaw (ပြည်သူ့လွှတ်တော်, People's Assembly) and the 224-seat Amyotha Hluttaw (အမျိုးသားလွှတ်တော်, National Assembly). The Defence Services (military) member delegates are reserved a maximum of 56 of 224 seats in the National Assembly and 110 seats of 440 in the People's Assembly. This is similar to former Indonesian and Thai constitutions.

The revisions in state structure, including the creation of self-administering areas were not implemented until August 2010. The constitution itself came into force on 31 January 2011.

At the time of its release, foreign media often incorrectly alleged that the constitution barred Aung San Suu Kyi from holding public office because of her marriage to a British citizen; in fact, she would only be barred from the office of President, under the disqualification of those who have a spouse or children who are foreign citizens. There is no similar disqualification for any other public office.

=== 2008 constitutional referendum ===
On 10 May 2008 a referendum was held to outline the political framework of the country. According to Chief Justice Aung Toe, chairman of the drafting commission,

In drafting the constitution, the commission adhered strictly to the six objectives, including giving the Tatmadaw (the military) the leading political role in the future state.

The government did not allow Cyclone Nargis to delay the referendum which took place as scheduled except in the delta areas affected by the cyclone.

The National League for Democracy, which is led by Aung San Suu Kyi, was not allowed to participate in the creation of the constitution, and urged citizens to reject the constitution which it labelled as a "sham." The referendum itself passed the 2008 Constitution, but was generally regarded as fraudulent by the opposition party and those outside of Burma.

The SPDC reported a heavy turnout on both dates, with few voting irregularities. Opposition groups say the turnout was comparatively light, with many reported cases of voting irregularities, such as premarked ballots, voter intimidation, and other techniques to influence the outcome of the referendum.

=== 2012 by-elections ===
In spite of its earlier opposition to the 2008 constitution, the NLD participated in the 2012 by-election for 46 seats and won a landslide victory, with Aung San Suu Kyi becoming a member of parliament, alongside 42 others from her party.

=== Amending process ===
The ruling party and opposition parties have acknowledged that amendments are needed. The 2008 constitution reserves 25% of seats in parliament for members of the military, with the most powerful posts given to active-duty or retired generals. According to the 2008 Constitution of Myanmar, certain sections require a nation-wide referendum in addition to more than 75% support in both houses of the Pyidaungsu Hluttaw (legislature) to amend, while other sections do not need a referendum to amend. The changes that need a referendum must be approved by more than 50% of the registered voters. Two amendments without needing the referendum have been made, in 2015 and 2020 respectively.

==== First Amendment (2015) ====
The first amendment was initiated by the then-ruling party Union Solidarity and Development Party in 2013. The Pyidaungsu Hluttaw enacted the amendment on 22 July 2015.

==== Second Amendment (2020) ====
The National League for Democracy, the then-ruling party, initiated the second process for amendment in 2019. The amendment was enacted by the Pyidaungsu Hluttaw on 26 March 2020.

=== Content of Constitution ===
The Myanmar Constitution has 15 chapters. Chapters 4, 5, and 6 concern the separation of powers between the legislature, judiciary, and executive. Due to over 50 years of military rule, the Constitution of Myanmar is dominated by the military, with 25% of the seats in both houses of the Pyidaungsu Hluttaw reserved for military representatives. Proposed changes to most parts of the constitution must be approved by more than 75% of both houses of Pyidaungsu Hluttaw. For some others it must do so then go to a referendum. When the referendum is held, the changes must be approved by at least 50% of the registered voters, rather than 50% of those voting. A 194-page booklet containing the text in Burmese and English is available to download.

==== Type of content ====
- Preamble
1. Basic Principles of the Union
2. State Structure
3. Head of State
4. Legislature
5. Executive
6. Judiciary
7. Defence Services
8. Citizen, Fundamental Rights and Duties of the Citizens
9. Election
10. Political Parties
11. Provisions on State of Emergency
12. Amendment of the Constitution
13. State Flag, State Seal, National Anthem and the Capital
14. Transitory Provisions
15. General Provisions

== List of constitutions and amendments ==
Constitutions and amendments
Sr. No.	Year	Legislation	Ratified by			Promulgated by		Promulgated Date	Effective Date
Sr. No.	Year	Legislation	Legislature		Referendum	Promulgated by		Promulgated Date	Effective Date
Estd.	1935	The Government of Burma Act, 1935	36th	Parliament of the United Kingdom	—	George V	King of the United Kingdom	2 August 1935	1 April 1937
Estd.	1943	Constitution for Government of Burma [Act No.1 of 1305 B.E.]	Preparatory Commission for Burmese Independence (assembled as Burma Constituent Assembly)		—	Dr. Ba Maw	President of the Preparatory Commission for Burmese Independence (as the President of the Burma Constituent Assembly)	1 August 1943	1 August 1943
Estd.	1947	The Constitution of the Union of Burma	Constituent Assembly of Burma		—	Sao Shwe Thaik	Provisional President	24 September 1947	4 January 1948
1st	1947	Amendments by the Amending Power of the President of the Constituent Assembly	Amending Power of the President of the Constituent Assembly (authorized by Constituent Assembly of Burma)		—	Sao Shwe Thaik	President of the Constituent Assembly of Burma	December 1947	4 January 1948
2nd	1948	Amendments Outside of the Amending Power of the President of the Constituent Assembly	Constituent Assembly of Burma		—	Sao Shwe Thaik	President of the Constituent Assembly of Burma	3 Jaunary 1948	4 January 1948
Temp.	1949	Union of Burma (for the First Election According to the Constitution) Transitory Provisional Order, 1949	President's House (with approval of Constituent Assembly of Burma)		—	Sao Shwe Thaik	Provisional President	18 June 1949	4 January 1948 (Note: "the day on which this constitution comes into force")
Temp.	1950	Union of Burma (for the First Election According to the Constitution) Transitory Provisional Order, 1950	President's House (with approval of Constituent Assembly of Burma)		—	Sao Shwe Thaik	Provisional President	22 February 1950	4 January 1948 (Note: "the day on which this constitution comes into force")
Temp.	1951	Union of Burma (for the First Election According to the Constitution) Transitory Provisional Order, 1951	President's House (with approval of Constituent Assembly of Burma)		—	Sao Shwe Thaik	Provisional President	21 March 1951	4 January 1948 (Note: "the day on which this constitution comes into force")
Temp.	1951	Union of Burma (for the First Election According to the Constitution) Second Transitory Provisional Order, 1951	President's House (with approval of Constituent Assembly of Burma)		—	Sao Shwe Thaik	Provisional President	24 March 1951	4 January 1948 (Note: "the day on which this constitution comes into force")
3rd	1951	The Constitution Amendment Act, 1951 [Act No. LXII of 1951.]	Constituent Assembly of Burma (serving as Provisional Parliament)		—	Sao Shwe Thaik	Provisional President	7 November 1951	• all sections except 3 and 7: 7 November 1951 • sections 3 and 7: 3 March 1957 (Note: The day on which the Parliament constituted by the first MP election according to the Section 233 of the Constitution was dissolved)
Temp.	1959	The Constitution (Amendment) Act, 1959 [An Act to amend the Constitution of the Union of Burma.] [Act No. IV of 1959.]	2nd	Union Parliament	—	Win Maung	President	26 February 1959	26 February 1959
4th	1959	The Constitution (Second Amendment) Act, 1959. [Act. No. X of 1959.] (An Act to amend the Constitution of the Union of Burma.)	2nd	Union Parliament	—	Win Maung	President	17 March 1959	— (Note: designated to come into force "on the next day after the day on which the next elected Chamber of Deputies is dissolved")
5th	1961	The Constitution Amendment Act,1961. [Act No.III of 1961.]	3rd	Union Parliament	—	Win Maung	President	24 March 1961	24 March 1961
6th	1961	The Constitution (Second) Amendment Act, 1961. [Act No. VII of 1961.]	3rd	Union Parliament	—	Win Maung	President	25 March 1961	25 March 1961
7th	1961	The Constitution (Third Amendment) Act, 1961. [Act No. XVII of 1961]	3rd	Union Parliament	—	Win Maung	President	26 August 1961	26 August 1961
8th	1961	The Constitution (Fourth Amendment) Act, 1961. [Act No. XX of 1961.]	3rd	Union Parliament	—	Win Maung	President	28 September 1961	28 September 1961
Estd.	1974	The Constitution of the Socialist Republic of the Union of Burma	2nd	Party Congress of the Burma Socialist Programme Party	a nationwide referendum (on 15 – 31 December 1973)	Ne Win	Chairman of the Revolutionary Council of the Union of Burma	3 January 1974	3 January 1974
1st	1981	The Law Amending the Constitution of the Socialist Republic of the Union of Burma [Pyithu Hluttaw Law No. 1, 1981]	2nd	Pyithu Hluttaw	—	Ne Win	Chairman of the Council of State	18 March 1981	18 March 1981
2nd	1985	The Law Amending the Constitution of the Socialist Republic of the Union of Burma [Pyithu Hluttaw Law No. 1, 1985]	3rd	Pyithu Hluttaw	—	San Yu	Chairman of the Council of State	29 March 1985	29 March 1985
* (Note: Listed as the final amendment of the former constitutions written in English)	1989	The Adaptation of Expressions Law (The State Law and Order Restoration Council Law No. 15/89)	State Law and Order Restoration Council		—	Saw Maung	Chairman of the State Law and Order Restoration Council	18 June 1989	18 June 1989
Estd.	2008	The Constitution of the Republic of the Union of Myanmar (2008)	National Convention		a nation-wide referendum • (on 10 May 2008) • (on 24 May 2008 in some townships)	Than Shwe	Chairman of the State Peace and Development Council	29 May 2008	31 January 2011
1st	2015	The Law Amending the Constitution of the Republic of the Union of Myanmar (The Pyidaungsu Hluttaw Law No. 45, 2015)	1st	Pyidaungsu Hluttaw	— (Note: Only the amendments that do not require a referendum. A proposed referendum for an amendment which required it was cancelled and that amendment was excluded.)	Thein Sein	President	22 July 2015	22 July 2015
2nd	2020	The Second Amending Law of the Constitution of the Republic of the Union of Myanmar (The Pyidaungsu Hluttaw Law No.3, 2020)	2nd	Pyidaungsu Hluttaw	—	Win Myint	President	26 March 2020	26 March 2020
