= Burma Socialist Programme Party =

Ruling party of Burma from 1962 to 1988

Burma Socialist Programme Party မြန်မာ့ဆိုရှယ်လစ်လမ်းစဉ်ပါတီ
- Abbreviation: BSPP (English) မဆလ (Burmese)
- General Secretary: Ne Win
- Founded: 4 July 1962 (64 years, 119 days)
- Dissolved: 24 September 1988 (38 years, 37 days)
- Succeeded by: National Unity Party
- Headquarters: Rangoon
- Youth wing: Programme Youth Organisation
- Membership: ▲885,460 (1980)
- Ideology: Burmese Way to Socialism; Burmese Nationalism; Ultranationalism; Left-wing nationalism; Militarism; Marxism (elements); Chauvinism; Anti-Federalism; Anti-Imperialism; Fascism (accused)
- Political position: Syncretic
- Religion: Theravada Buddhism

Party flag

The Burma Socialist Programme Party (BSPP), (Note: Burmese: မြန်မာ့ဆိုရှယ်လစ်လမ်းစဉ်ပါတီ, pronounced [mjəma̰ sʰòʃɛ̀lɪʔ láɰ̃zɪ̀ɰ̃ pàtì]; abbreviated မဆလ, pronounced [ma̰ sʰa̰ la̰]) also referred to as the Lanzin Party (lit. "Programme Party"), was the ruling political party of Burma (present-day Myanmar) from 1962 to 1988 and the country's sole legal party from 1964 to 1988. Party chairman Ne Win overthrew the country's democratically elected government in a coup d'état on 2 March 1962. For the next 26 years, the BSPP governed Burma under a totalitarian military dictatorship, until mass protests in 1988 pressured party officials to adopt a multi-party system.

== Founding and programme ==
The BSPP was established on 4 July 1962, after the declaration of the "Burmese Way to Socialism" (BWS) by the Union Revolutionary Council (URC) on 30 April 1962. The BWS set out the political and economic ideology of the URC which had taken over power in the military coup of 2 March 1962.

The BSPP advocated a programme of the "Burmese Way to Socialism" which, according to Ne Win, incorporated elements of Buddhism, humanism, and Marxism. The programme was described by some scholars as anti-Western and isolationist. A booklet entitled Special Characteristics of the Burma Socialist Programme Party was published in January 1963 in both Burmese and English. The booklet distinguished the BSPP's ideology from those of both "bourgeois" social democratic parties and communist parties. The BSPP, the booklet stated, rejected the "bourgeois" belief and practices of social democratic parties that socialism could be reached through parliamentary methods (even before the announcement of the BWS, the URC had already abolished, by decree, the parliament that was established under the 1947 Burmese Constitution, stating in effect that parliamentary democracy was not suitable for Burma). The booklet further stated that, although there was much to be learnt from the doctrines of Marx, Engels and Lenin, it did not regard their word as "gospel" unlike the Burmese communists, which the booklet referred to as "vulgar materialists".

Later in the same year the BSPP elaborated on its ideology in a book published in both Burmese and English entitled The System of Correlation between Man and His Environment, commonly referred to simply as "correlation" (innya myinnya). The book used both Buddhist and Marxist rhetoric to espouse what came to be known as the "Burmese Way to Socialism". Its most memorable line was borrowed from an old popular expression, "One can only afford to be moral on a full stomach", which struck a chord with the people trying to eke out a living in increasingly dire economic circumstances under the rule of the BSPP. These economic conditions were a consequence of the policies implemented by the BSPP-led Socialist Economy Construction Committee (hsa sa ta ka), starting with the nationalisation of all businesses across the board.

== One-party state ==
On 23 March 1964, the URC issued a decree entitled "The Law Protecting National Unity" whereby all political parties except the BSPP were abolished and their assets appropriated. This was repealed on the day the State Law and Order Restoration Council (SLORC) seized power in the military coup of 18 September 1988.

The now-defunct 1974 Constitution of the Socialist Republic of the Union of Burma constitutionalised the BSPP's leading role in Burmese politics. Article 11 of the 1974 Constitution stated that, "The State shall adopt a single party system. The Burma Socialist Programme Party is the single political party and it shall lead the State". This provision merely formalised what was already a fait accompli—a one-party state—since March 1964.

All government servants from all sectors including doctors, teachers, engineers, scientists, managers from the nationalised industries and businesses as well as civil administrators were compelled to undergo a three-month political indoctrination and basic military training at the Hpaunggyi Central People's Services Training School, accommodated in military barracks, starting in the early 1970s. The phrase "socialist consciousness" (ဆိုရှယ်လစ်အသိ, hsoshalit athi) became a pun for socialist friend or connection that one must have to get anything or anywhere. The Military Intelligence Service (MIS) and its army of informers served the function of the secret police to sniff out and extinguish any political dissent.

== Cadre to mass party ==
In 1971 BSPP was opened up for mass membership as "a people's party". During the 1960s, there were three types of membership in the BSPP. The first type or tier was that of a "friend of the party" (ပါတီမိတ်ဆွေ). The second type or tier was "alternate or provisional membership" (အရန်ပါတီဝင်, lending itself to mockery as အရမ်း means "reckless") and the third type was that of a "fully-fledged" party member (တင်းပြည့်ပါတီဝင်). Under the party rules of the time once a person became a "full party member", unless there were extraordinary reasons such as those of ill-health one could not "resign from the party". A full party member could only be dismissed from the party. The BSPP continued to be dominated by the military, and in 1972 more than half of its 73,369 full members was still made up of army or police personnel; Dr. Maung Maung was notably the only civilian in the higher echelons of the party.

== Congresses ==
Prior to being transformed from a cadre party to a mass party, the BSPP held four seminars, the last one from 6 to 11 November 1969.

- The first Congress of the BSPP was held from 28 June 1971 to 11 July 1971
- The second in October 1973
- The third in February 1977
- The fourth in August 1981
- The fifth in October 1985

Extraordinary Congresses of the BSPP were held in:

- April 1973
- October 1976
- November 1977
- July 1988
- September 1988

At each regular Congress of the BSPP starting from June 1971 to October 1985, Ne Win was elected and re-elected by the BSPP as its chairman. Each Congress also elected a 150 to 200 member Central Committee and in the later Congresses a Central Executive Committee (roughly equivalent to that of the Politburo in one-party Communist States though the term "Politburo" was never used) of about 10 to 15 members were elected.

== Student wing ==
The URC merged the Union of Burma Boy Scouts and the Union of Burma Girl Guides Association in 1962 to create the coeducational Union of Burma Boy Scouts and Girl Guides (UBBSGG). The URC dissolved the UBBSGG on 1 March 1964 and turned over its assets to the Ministry of Education, which subsequently formed the Programme Youth Organisation (PYO; လမ်းစဉ်လူငယ်အဖွဲ့, Lansin Lu-nge Aphwe) as the UBBSGG's replacement.

All students, from elementary to university level, were required to join the PYO. The organisation had three branches: The Glorious Youth (တေဇလူငယ်, Teiza Lu-nge) for primary school students (5 to 9 years old), the Pioneer Youth (ရှေ့ဆောင်လူငယ်, Sheihsaung Lu-nge) for middle and high school students (10 to 15 years old), and the Programme Youth (လမ်းစဉ်လူငယ်, Lansin Lu-nge) for college or university students and youths (16 to 25 years old). Upon reaching the age of 18 years old, members of the Programme Youth could apply to become provisional members of the BSPP. At the age of 21 years old, a provisional member could apply to become a full-fledged member of the BSPP.

=== Inspirations ===
Although the BSPP was anti-communist and neutral in Cold War politics, the student wings of BSPP were based on the model of the Young Communist Leagues of Eastern Bloc countries, particularly the Soviet Union's Komsomol.

- တေဇလူငယ်: တေဇ (Teiza) has nothing to do with the meaning of its words, but it was the nom de guerre of Aung San (ဗိုလ်တေဇ, Bo Teiza), who was one of the Thirty Comrades. The photo of Aung San as Bo Teiza is their badge, and they wore blue scarf and uniform like children organisations from communist countries.
- ရှေ့ဆောင်လူငယ်: ရှေ့‌ဆောင် (Sheihsaung) is translation of Pioneer. It was formed as the pioneer movement. They wore school uniform and the red scarf like pioneer movement of communist countries.
- လမ်းစဉ်လူငယ်: လမ်းစဉ် (Lansin) means either "programme" (as in Burma Socialist Programme Party) or "way" (as in Burmese Way to Socialism) or "path" (as in Magga Path). They did not wear scarf, but top white and bottom blue uniform either westernised or traditional.

== Purge ==
In November 1977 a purge of the BSPP including those on the Central Committee took place. This schism in the BSPP was seen as a power-struggle or in-fighting between the military faction and the ex-communist faction (mainly consisting of some ex-communist rebels who had surrendered to the government, joined and risen in the ranks of the BSPP hierarchy and their sympathisers) in the BSPP. Among the thousands that were purged from the party were leftists or communist sympathizers.

== Crisis ==
An Extraordinary Congress of the BSPP was held from 23 to 26 July 1988. In his inaugural speech on 23 July 1988, party chairman Ne Win stunned the nation when he, "taking indirect responsibility for the sad and bloody events of March and June 1988" (whereby many students and civilians in largely peaceful protests against the BSPP regime were shot and killed by the Military Police Lone Htein) tendered his resignation as party chairman. Ne Win also announced that four of his colleagues vice-chairman and State President San Yu, General Secretary Aye Ko, Joint-General Secretary Sein Lwin and Member of the Central Executive Committee Tun Tin, also a Deputy Prime Minister, had expressed their desire to resign. Referring to the student-led demonstrations against the government in March and June 1988 Ne Win stated that these events indicated that some people "don't like the government and the Party that led the government". He also proposed that a nationwide referendum be held in late September 1988 to determine whether the people preferred the one-party system or wished to shift to a multi-party system.

== Fall from power ==
The BSPP Congress accepted the resignations of Chairman Ne Win and Vice-chairman San Yu but rejected the resignations of General Secretary Aye Ko, Joint General Secretary Sein Lwin and Central Executive Committee member Tun Tin. Joint-General Secretary Sein Lwin (former Brigadier, d. 9 April 2004) was chosen and appointed as the new Chairman of the Party by the Party Congress. The appointment of Sein Lwin, who was widely perceived to be mainly responsible for the shootings and killings of more than 100 students at Rangoon University on 7 July 1962, shortly after Ne Win's coup d'état, as well as the killings of students and civilians in March and June 1988, earning the epithet "Butcher of Rangoon", sparked widespread protests in the country.

The Extraordinary Party Congress of July 1988 also rejected Ne Win's call for a national referendum. The election of Sein Lwin as Party Chairman as well as the refusal by the BSPP to take steps to move towards a multi-party system led to massive demonstrations to which the military responded by shooting and killing hundreds if not thousands of demonstrators in many towns and cities across the country from 8–12 August 1988. On 12 August 1988 Sein Lwin resigned as both Party Chairman and State President. After the selection by the BSPP Central Committee of Maung Maung (31 January 1925 – 2 July 1994) as Party Chairman on 19 August and later by the Pyithu Hluttaw as State President on 20 August 1988, the uprising against the BSPP government intensified.

On 10 September 1988 in yet another hastily reconvened Congress, the BSPP decided to hold multi-party elections and the next day the Pyithu Hluttaw passed a resolution to hold multi-party elections "not earlier than 45 days and not later than 90 days". However massive demonstrations in Rangoon and the rest of the country continued, demanding for the resignation of the BSPP government led by Maung Maung in favour of a neutral interim government to supervise multi-party elections. On 18 September 1988 the State Law and Order Restoration Council (SLORC or na wa ta), led by the army Chief of Staff General Saw Maung (d. July 1997) took over after crushing the failed 8888 Uprising of 8 August 1988.

The party changed its name to the National Unity Party (NUP) on 24 September 1988. The NUP contested the 1990 general election and was seen as a proxy party of the military and the main rival to Aung San Suu Kyi's National League for Democracy. The NUP was defeated in the election, but the results were not recognised by the military and subsequently voided.

== Chairmen ==
No.	Portrait	Name (Birth–Death)	Term of office			Additional position(s)
No.	Portrait	Name (Birth–Death)	Took office	Left office	Time in office	Additional position(s)
1		Ne Win နေဝင်း (1911–2002)	4 July 1962	23 July 1988 (Resigned)	26 years, 19 days	Chairman of the Union Revolutionary Council and Prime Minister (1962–1974); President (1962–1981)
2		Sein Lwin စိန်လွင် (1923–2004)	26 July 1988	12 August 1988 (Resigned)	17 days	President (1988)
3		Maung Maung မောင်မောင် (1925–1994)	19 August 1988	18 September 1988 (Deposed in a coup)	30 days	President (1988)

== Electoral history ==
=== People's Assembly elections ===
Election	Party leader	Votes	%	Seats	+/–	Position	Outcome
1974	Ne Win		100%	451 / 451	▲451	▲1st	Sole legal party
1978	Ne Win		100%	464 / 464	▲13	1st	Sole legal party
1981	Ne Win		100%	475 / 475	▲11	1st	Sole legal party
1985	Ne Win		100%	489 / 489	▲14	1st	Sole legal party
