= Pyithu Hluttaw (1974–1988) =

Unicameral legislature of the Socialist Republic of the Union of Burma

Pyithu Hluttaw ပြည်သူ့လွှတ်တော်

Type
- Type: Unicameral
- Term limits: 4 years

History
- Founded: 1974
- Disbanded: 1988
- Preceded by: Union Parliament (1947–1962)
- Succeeded by: Pyidaungsu Hluttaw (2011–present)

Structure
- Seats: 489
- Political groups: Burma Socialist Programme Party

Elections
- Last election: 6–20 October 1985

Meeting place
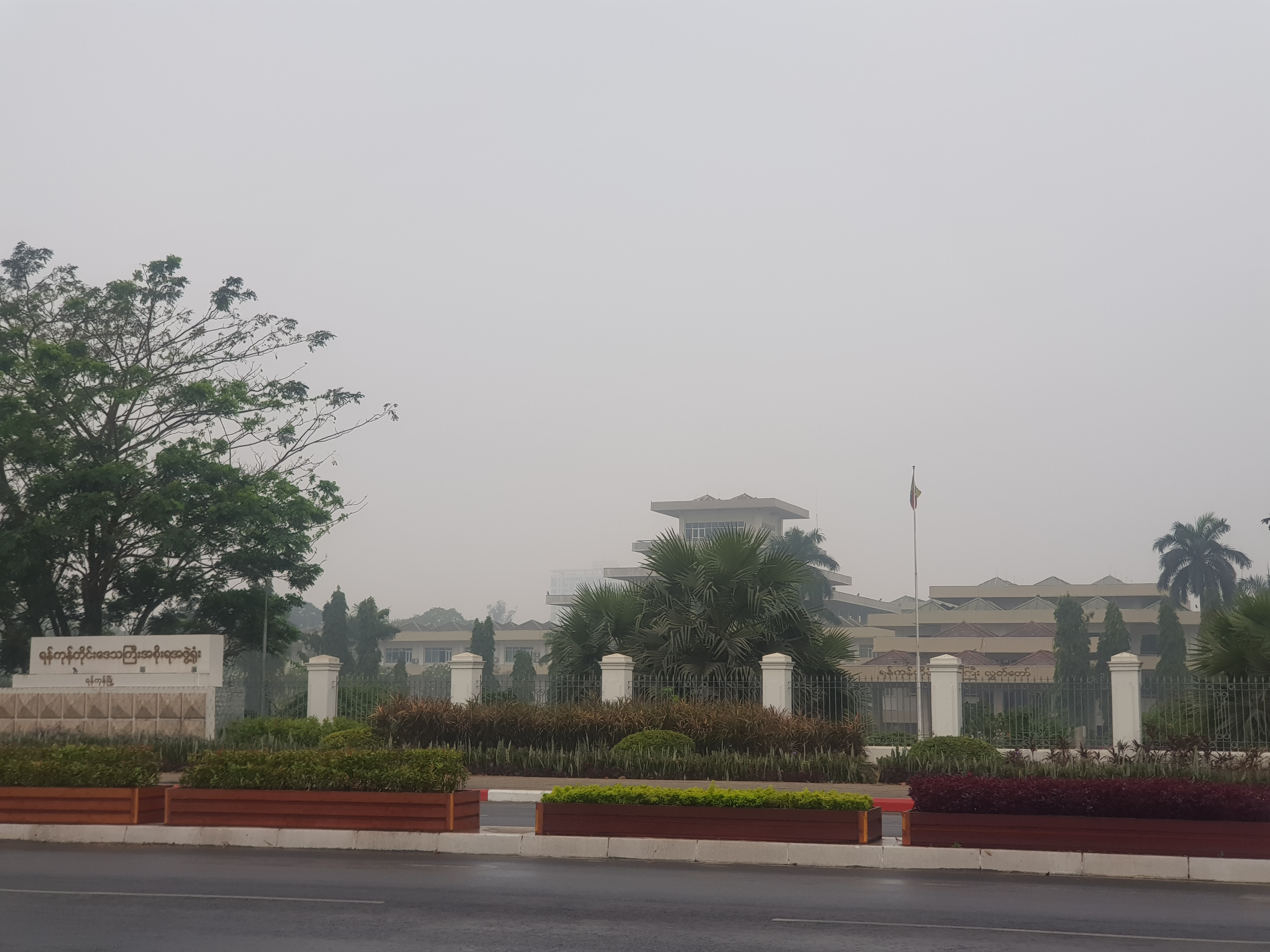
- Rangoon, Burma In August 2010, the old Pyithu Hluttaw complex on Yangon's Pyay Road was slated for occupation by Yangon Region government office and Yangon Region Hluttaw

The Pyithu Hluttaw (Burmese: ပြည်သူ့လွှတ်တော်, lit. 'People's Assembly') was the unicameral legislature of the Socialist Republic of the Union of Burma from 1974 to 1988. It was established under the 1974 Constitution of Burma and disbanded with the takeover of the State Law and Order Restoration Council (SLORC) in 1988. By the 2008 Constitution of Myanmar, one of the houses of the Pyidaungsu Hluttaw, current parliament of Myanmar, is also called Pyithu Hluttaw.

Following the 1962 Burmese coup d'état, there was no functional legislature in existence from 1962 to 1974, as the Revolutionary Council of the Union of Burma served in its capacity.

Under the 1974 Constitution, the Pyithu Hluttaw was composed of members of the Burma Socialist Programme Party. Each term was four years.

In addition to serving as the legislature of Burma, the Pyithu Hluttaw was responsible for the:

- Interpretation of the 1974 Constitution of Burma
- Election of the members of the Council of State and the Council of Ministers
