= Socialist Republic of the Union of Burma =

State in Southeast Asia (1962–1988)

Coordinates: 16°51′N 096°11′E

Union of Burma (1962–1974) ပြည်ထောင်စု မြန်မာနိုင်ငံတော်‌ Pyidaunzu Myăma Nainngandaw Socialist Republic of the Union of Burma (1974–1988) ပြည်ထောင်စု ဆိုရှယ်လစ်သမ္မတ မြန်မာနိုင်ငံတော် Pyidaunzu Soshallhaitsammat Myăma Nainngandaw
- 1962–1988
- Flag (1974–1988) Seal (1974–1988)
- Anthem: ကမ္ဘာမကျေ Kaba Ma Kyei "Till the End of the World"
- Capital: Rangoon
- Common languages: Burmese
- Religion: Secularism (de facto until 1980s); Buddhism (majority; de jure state religion, de facto from 1980s)
- Demonym: Burmese
- Government: Unitary one-party (Note: after 1964) constitutional (Note: after 1974) socialist republic under a totalitarian military dictatorship
- Party Chairman
  - 1962–1988 (first): Ne Win (Note: The Chairman of Burma Socialist Programme Party was de facto leader of Burma)
  - 1988 (last): Maung Maung
- Council Chairman / President
  - 1962–1981 (first): Ne Win (Note: Titled "Chairman of the Revolutionary Council of the Union of Burma" until 1974 which was de facto President of Burma)
  - 1988 (last): Maung Maung
- Government Chairman / Prime minister
  - 1962–1974 (first): Ne Win (Note: Titled "Chairman of the Revolutionary Government of the Union of Burma" until 1974 which was de facto Prime Minister of Burma)
  - 1988 (last): Tun Tin
- Legislature: Revolutionary Council of the Union of Burma (1962–1974); Pyithu Hluttaw (1974–1988)
- Historical era: Cold War
  - 1962 coup d'etat: 2 March 1962
  - 1974 constitution: 3 January 1974
  - 1988 coup d'etat: 18 September 1988
- HDI (1980): 0.328 low
- Currency: Kyat
- Calling code: 95
- ISO 3166 code: BU
Preceded by	Succeeded by
Union of Burma	Union of Burma
- Today part of: Myanmar

The Socialist Republic of the Union of Burma was a socialist country from 1974 to 1988, under the leadership of Ne Win, among other leaders, and the Burma Socialist Programme Party (BSPP). However, Burma was also a military dictatorship, under the control of Ne Win from 1962 to 1988. Ne Win and his allies in the Tatmadaw – the country's armed forces – overthrew the government of Prime Minister U Nu in a coup d'état on 2 March 1962. A day later, the coup leaders established the Revolutionary Council of the Union of Burma as the country's governing body. In April 1962, the Revolutionary Council introduced the Burmese Way to Socialism and declared it Burma's state ideology. The Revolutionary Council then founded the BSPP as the country's vanguard party on 4 July 1962. In 1974, Ne Win introduced a new constitution and replaced the Revolutionary Council with the Pyithu Hluttaw, which consisted solely of BSPP members. The country's official name was also changed from the Union of Burma (Note: Burmese: ပြည်ထောင်စု မြန်မာနိုင်ငံတော်‌, romanized: Pyidaunzu Myăma Nainngandaw) to the Socialist Republic of the Union of Burma. (Note: Burmese: ပြည်ထောင်စု ဆိုရှယ်လစ်သမ္မတ မြန်မာနိုင်ငံတော်, romanized: Pyidaunzu Soshallhaitsammat Myăma Nainngandaw) The Communist Party of Burma which opposed Ne Win called it Ne Win-San Yu military regime.

Ne Win's governance of Burma was characterised by totalitarianism, isolationism, superstition (yadaya), xenophobia, and a rejection of Cold War politics. Ne Win ruled Burma as a dictator, serving as both Chairman of the Revolutionary Council (later President of Burma) and Prime Minister of Burma, the country's head of state and head of government, respectively. The nationalisation of major industries and rejection of foreign investment led to catastrophic declines in economic growth and living standards.

In 1988, mass protests known as the 8888 Uprising pressured BSPP officials, including Ne Win, to resign en masse and adopt a multi-party system. However, on 18 September 1988 the Tatmadaw staged a coup against the BSPP, violently ended the protests, and established a new military junta, the State Law and Order Restoration Council (SLORC).

== Background ==
Burma under Prime Minister U Nu and the AFPFL-led coalition government in the Union Parliament had implemented left-wing economic and welfare policies, although economic growth remained slow throughout the 1950s. By 1958, Burma was largely beginning to recover economically, but was beginning to fall apart politically due to a split in the ruling AFPFL into two factions: the Clean AFPFL led by U Nu and Thakin Tin, and the Stable AFPFL led by Ba Swe and Kyaw Nyein. This situation persisted despite the unexpected success of U Nu's "Arms for Democracy" offer taken up by U Seinda in the Arakan, the Pa-O, some Mon and Shan groups, but more significantly by the PVO surrendering their arms. The Union Parliament became very unstable, with U Nu barely surviving a no-confidence vote only with the support of the opposition National United Front (NUF), believed to have crypto-communists amongst them. Hardliners in the Tatmadaw viewed this as a threat of the Communist Party of Burma (CPB) coming to an agreement with U Nu through the NUF, and resulted in U Nu inviting General Ne Win, the Army Chief of Staff, to serve as interim prime minister to restore order in Burma. Over 400 "communist sympathizers" were arrested, of which 153 were deported to a penal colony on Great Coco Island in the Andaman Sea. Among them was the NUF leader Aung Than, older brother of Aung San. Newspapers like Botahtaung, Kyemon and Rangoon Daily were also closed down.

On 28 October 1958, Ne Win staged an internal coup d'état under the auspices of U Nu and successfully restored Burma's political stability, a period known as the "Ne Win caretaker government", until the February 1960 general election which returned U Nu's Clean AFPFL, renamed as the Union Party, with a large majority. Ne Win officially handed back power to the victorious U Nu on 4 April 1960. However, the situation in Burma did not remain stable for long due to petitions from the Shan federalist movement started by Sao Shwe Thaik, the first President of Burma from 1948 to 1952 and the Saopha of Nyaung Shwe. The Shan federalists were aspiring to create a "loose" federation in Burma, and were seen as a separatist movement for insisting on the Burmese government honouring the right to secession in 10 years provided for by the 1947 Constitution. Ne Win had already succeeded in stripping the Shan Saopha of their feudal powers in exchange for comfortable pensions for life in 1959, but the unresolved issues of federalism and social order continued.

== History ==
=== 1962 Burmese coup d'état ===
The elected civilian government had lost most of its legitimacy by 1962; the Burmese public perceived it as corrupt, inept at ruling the country, and unable to restore law and order. Meanwhile, the Tatmadaw rose in popularity thanks to the stability created by Ne Win's caretaker government. Burma also faced various economic, religious, and political crises, particularly the ethnic-based insurgencies in the country's peripheries and the issues of federalism and separatism. Less than two years after returning to civilian rule, Ne Win launched a second military-backed coup d'état on 2 March 1962, this time without U Nu's blessing.

The coup succeeded with little bloodshed and its instigators established the Revolutionary Council of the Union of Burma to replace the Union Parliament as Burma's supreme governing body. In April 1962, the Revolutionary Council declared Burma a socialist state and announced the "Burmese Way to Socialism" as a blueprint for economic development, decreasing foreign influence in Burma to zero per cent, and increasing the role of the military in politics. The Revolutionary Council also founded the Burma Socialist Programme Party (BSPP) on 4 July 1962 to nominally separate the powers of the military from the government. However, the BSPP's leadership was dominated by military officials for all of its history, although the party did make attempts to transition into a mass party, such as the replacement of the Revolutionary Council with the People's Assembly in 1974.

=== Failure of the Burmese Way to Socialism ===
Despite the Union Revolutionary Council leaders' phraseology being socialist, their actions were those of ardent nationalists seeking to maximize the power of their state.

The subsequent discussion of the nature of ownership, planning and development strategy in Burma between 1962 and the mid-1970s indicates that while Burma formally established the structures of a socialist economy, it did not effectively implement those structures. Furthermore, since the mid-1970s due to economic failure, Burma had to accept policies that imply more private activity, including foreign investment. According to a 1981 scholarly analysis, "there is little evidence that Burma either is now, or is in the process of becoming a socialist society". The study also stated that "the leadership, although demonstrating a certain social concern, clearly lacks the ability and the will necessary to build a socialist society".

The implementation of the Burmese Way to Socialism negatively affected the economy, educational standards, and living standards of the Burmese people. Foreign aid organisations, like the American-based Ford Foundation and Asia Foundation, as well as the World Bank, were no longer allowed to operate in the country. Only permitted was aid from a government-to-government basis. In addition, the teaching of the English language was reformed and moved to secondary schools, whereas previously it had started as early as kindergarten. The government also implemented extensive visa restrictions for Burmese citizens, especially when their destinations were Western countries. Instead, the government sponsored the travel of students, scientists and technicians to the Soviet Union and Eastern Europe, in order to receive training and to "counter years of Western influence" in the country. Similarly, visas for foreigners were limited to just 24 hours.

Furthermore, freedom of expression and the freedom of the press was extensively restricted. Foreign language publications were prohibited, as were newspapers that printed "false propagandist news." The Press Scrutiny Board (now the Press Scrutiny and Registration Division), which censors all publications to this day, including newspapers, journals, advertisements and cartoons, was established by the Revolutionary Council through the Printers' and Publishers' Registration Act in August 1962. The Revolutionary Council set up the News Agency of Burma (BNA) to serve as a news distribution service in the country, thus effectively replacing the work of foreign news agencies. In September 1963, The Vanguard and The Guardian, two Burmese newspapers, were nationalised. In December 1965, publication of privately owned newspapers was banned by the government.

The impact on the Burmese economy was extensive. The Enterprise Nationalization Law, passed by the Revolutionary Council in 1963, nationalised all major industries, including import-export trade, rice, banking, mining, teak and rubber on 1 June 1963. In total, around 15,000 private firms were nationalised. Furthermore, industrialists were prohibited from establishing new factories with private capital. This was particularly detrimental to the Anglo-Burmese, Burmese Indians and the British, who were disproportionately represented in these industries.

The oil industry, which was previously controlled by American and British companies, such as the General Exploration Company and East Asiatic Burma Oil, were forced to end operations. In its place was the government-owned Burma Oil Company, which monopolised oil extraction and production. In August 1963, the nationalisation of basic industries, including department stores, warehouses and wholesale shops, followed. Price control boards were also introduced.

The Enterprise Nationalization Law directly affected foreigners in Burma, particularly Burmese Indians and the Burmese Chinese, both of whom had been influential in the economic sector as entrepreneurs and industrialists. Such xenophobic policies of the government caused large scale emigration of British, Indians & Chinese out of the country. causes By mid-1963, 2,500 foreigners a week were leaving Burma. By September 1964, approximately 100,000 Indian nationals had left the country.

The black market became a major feature of Burmese society, representing about 80% of the national economy during the Burmese Way period. Moreover, income disparity became a major socioeconomic issue. Throughout the 1960s, Burma's foreign exchange reserves declined from $214 million in 1964 to $50 million in 1971, while inflation skyrocketed. Rice exports also declined, from 1,840,000 tons in 1961-62 to 350,000 tons in 1967-68, the result of the inability of rice production to satisfy demand caused by high population growth rates.

In the 1st Burmese Socialist Programme Party (BSPP) Congress in 1971, several minor economic reforms were made, in light of the failures of the economic policy pursued throughout the 1960s. The Burmese government asked to rejoin the World Bank, joined the Asian Development Bank, and sought more foreign aid and assistance. The "Twenty-year plan", an economic plan divided into five increments of implementation, was introduced, in order to develop the country's natural resources, including agriculture, forestry, oil and natural gas, through state development. These reforms brought living standards back to pre-World War II levels and stimulated economic growth. However, by 1988, foreign debt had ballooned to $4.9 billion, about three-fourths of the national GDP, and Ne Win's later attempt to make the kyat based in denominations divisible by 9, a number he considered to be auspicious, led to the wiping of millions of savings of the Burmese people, resulting in the 8888 Uprising.

The Burmese Way to Socialism has largely been described by scholars as an "abject failure" which turned one of the most prosperous countries in Asia into one of the world's poorest. Burma experienced greatly increased poverty, inequality, corruption and international isolation, and has been described as "disastrous". Burma's real per capita GDP increased from US$159.18 in 1962 to US$219.20 in 1987, or about 1.3% per year, one of the weakest growth rates in East Asia over this period, but still positive. The program also may have served to increase domestic stability and keep Burma from being as entangled in the Cold War struggles that affected other Southeast Asian nations.
