= Revolutionary Council of the Union of Burma =

1962–1974 governing body of Burma

- ပြည်ထောင်စုမြန်မာနိုင်ငံတော်လှန်ရေးကောင်စီ
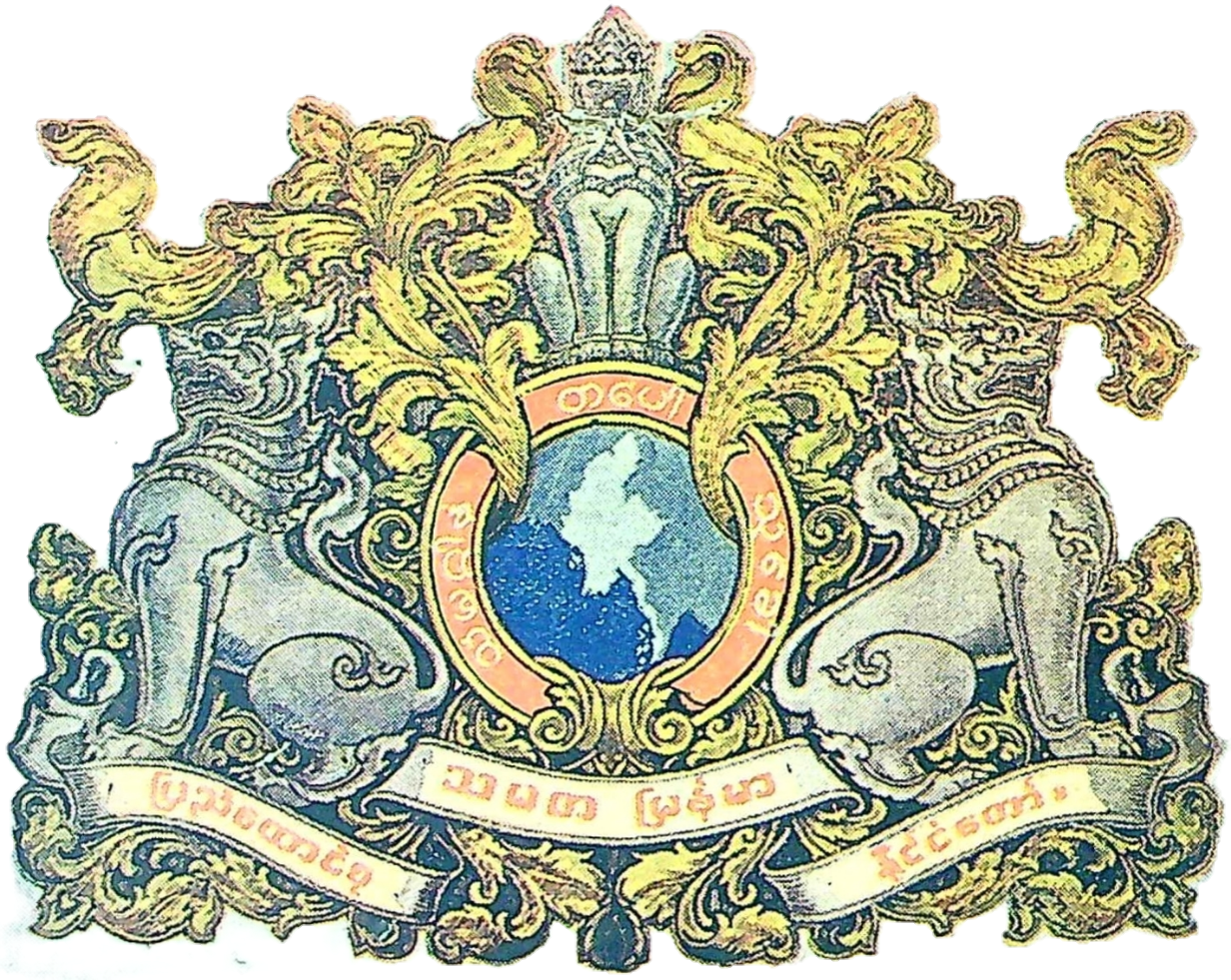

Agency overview
- Formed: 2 March 1962
- Dissolved: 3 March 1974
- Type: Council
- Jurisdiction: Burma
- Headquarters: Rangoon
- Agency executive: Ne Win, Chairman

The Revolutionary Council of the Union of Burma (Burmese: ပြည်ထောင်စုမြန်မာနိုင်ငံတော်လှန်ရေးကောင်စီ), (Note: Initially titled as the Revolutionary Council of the Union of the Republic of Burma (Burmese: ပြည်ထောင်စုသမတမြန်မာနိုင်ငံတော် တော်လှန်ရေးကောင်စီ) (Note: It was established on 2 March 1962 with the name Union of the Republic of Burma, Revolutionary Council (ပြည်ထောင်စုသမတမြန်မာနိုင်ငံတော် တော်လှန်ရေးကောင်စီ)) and the State Revolutionary Council (Burmese: နိုင်ငံတော်တော်လှန်ရေးကောင်စီ), or simply, the Revolutionary Council (Burmese: တော်လှန်ရေးကောင်စီ; RC)) was the supreme governing body of Burma (Myanmar) from 2 March 1962, following the overthrow of U Nu's civilian government, to 3 March 1974, ending with the promulgation of the 1974 Constitution of Burma and transfer of power to the Pyithu Hluttaw (People's Assembly), the country's new unicameral legislature.

The Revolutionary Council's philosophical framework was laid in the Burmese Way to Socialism, which aspired to convert Burma into a self-sustaining democratic socialist state, on 30 April 1962. On 4 July 1962, the RC established the Burma Socialist Programme Party (BSPP), the country's only legal political party which Donald M. Seekins claims was modelled along the lines of a Marxist–Leninist revolutionary party. From 1962 to 1971, BSPP transitioned from a cadre party (consisting of elite RC affiliated members) into a mass party. In the First Congress, the party had 344,226 members. By 1981, BSPP had 1.5 million members.

== Names ==
- The declaration of the council's establishment on 2 March 1962 used the name ပြည်ထောင်စုသမတမြန်မာနိုင်ငံတော်တော်လှန်ရေးကောင်စီ (Revolutionary Council of the Union of the Republic of Burma).
- The orders and law issued in 1962 used the name နိုင်ငံတော်တော်လှန်ရေးကောင်စီ (State Revolutionary Council).
- Later, the official full name became ပြည်ထောင်စုမြန်မာနိုင်ငံတော်လှန်ရေးကောင်စီ (Revolutionary Council of the Union of Burma).
- In short, it was also referred to as တော်လှန်ရေးကောင်စီ (Revolutionary Council) in news and media outlets.
- The name မြန်မာနိုင်ငံတော်လှန်ရေးကောင်စီ (Revolutionary Council of Burma) was used during the peace talks of 1960s.
- The Burmese version of the 1974 Constitution refers to it as ပြည်ထောင်စုမြန်မာနိုင်ငံတော်လှန်ရေးကောင်စီ and the English version the Revolutionary Council of the Union of Burma.

== Leadership ==
The Revolutionary Council was led by Ne Win, its chairman and 16 senior officers.

The founding members of the first Revolutionary Council, all of whom were military officers, are:

1. General Ne Win BC-3502 (Chief of General Staff)
2. Brigadier General Aung Gyi BC-5458 (Vice-Chief of General Staff) (Army)
3. Commodore Than Pe (died 1962) (Vice-Chief of General Staff) (Navy)
4. Brigadier General Thomas 'Tommy' Cliff (Vice-Chief of General Staff) (Air Force) (resigned 1964)
5. Brigadier General Tin Pe (resigned 1970) BC-3508 (Quartermaster General)
6. Colonel Than Sein BC-3574 (Colonel-General Staff)
7. Colonel Kyaw Soe (retired 1974) BC-3526 (Military Appointment General)
8. Colonel Chit Myaing (dismissed 1964) BC-3520 (Vice-Quartermaster General)
9. Colonel Khin Nyo (dismissed 1965) BC-3537 (Director General of Directorate of Military Training)
10. Colonel Hla Han (Director General of Directorate of Medical Services)
11. Brigadier General San Yu BC-3569 (Commander of Northern Military Command)
12. Brigadier General Sein Win BC-3525 (Commander of Central Military Command)
13. Colonel Thaung Kyi BC-3523 (Commander of Southeast Military Command)
14. Colonel Kyi Maung (sacked 1963) BC-3516 (Commander of Southwest Military Command)
15. Colonel Maung Shwe (resigned 1972) BC-3575 (Commander of Eastern Military Command)
16. Colonel Saw Myint (sacked 1964) BC-3518 (Administrator of Border Regions)
17. Colonel Tan Yu Sai (resigned 1968) BC-5090 (Vice-Commissioner of General of People's Police)

== Revolutionary Council member terms ==
Revolutionary Council of the Union of Burma
Name and Rank	Military Position	RC Position	Date
General Ne Win BC 3502	Chief of Staff, Defence Services	Chairman	2 March 1962 to 1 March 1974
Brigadier General Aung Gyi BC 5458	Vice Chief of Staff (Army)	Member	2 March 1962 to 7 February 1963
Brigadier General Than Phay	Vice Chief of Staff (Navy)	Member	2 March 1962 to 22 May 1962
Brigadier General Tin Phay BC 3508	Chairman of Forestry	Member	2 March 1962 to 14 November 1970
Brigadier General Tommy Clift	Vice Chief of Staff (Air)	Member	2 March 1962 to 2 November 1964
Brigadier General San Yu BC 3569	North Western Regional Military Command	Member	2 March 1962 to 2 March 1974
Brigadier General Sein Win BC 3525	Central Regional Military Command	Member	2 March 1962 to 2 March 1974
Colonel Kyi Maung BC 3516	South Western Regional Military Command	Member	2 March 1962 to 12 March 1963
Colonel Maung Shwe BC 3575	Eastern Regional Military Command	Member	2 March 1962 to 22 September 1972
Colonel Thaung Kyi BC 3523	South Eastern Regional Military Command	Member	2 March 1962 to 2 March 1974
Colonel Than Sein BC 3574	Colonel General Staff	Member	2 March 1962 to 2 March 1974
Colonel Kyaw Soe BC 3526	Military Appointment Secretary	Member	2 March 1962 to 2 March 1974
Colonel Saw Myint BC 3518	Director – Border Troops	Member	2 March 1962 to 17 August 1964
Colonel Chit Myaing BC 3520		Member	2 March 1962 to 31 March 1964
Colonel Khin Nyo BC 3537	Director – Military Training	Member	2 March 1962 to 9 June 1965
Colonel Tan Yu Saing BC 5090		Member	2 March 1962 to 6 October 1970
Colonel Lun Tin BC 3610	Commander – No. 7 Infantry Brigade	Member	5 July 1962 to 9 July 1971
Colonel Maung Lwin		Member	12 September 1964 to 2 March 1974
Colonel Tin Oo BC 3651	South Western Regional Command	Member	12 September 1964 to 2 March 1974
U Ba Nyein		Member	9 July 1971 to 2 March 1974
Dr. Maung Maung		Member	9 July 1971 to 2 March 1974
Mahn Thar Myaing		Member	9 July 1971 to 2 March 1974

== Revolutionary Government ==
The State Revolutionary Council formed its administrative government on 2 March 1962, and the government was formally renamed as the State Revolutionary Government (နိုင်ငံတော်တော်လှန်ရေးအစိုးရ) on 30 March 1962. This government later came to be known as the Revolutionary Government of the Union of Burma (ပြည်ထောင်စုမြန်မာနိုင်ငံတော်လှန်ရေးအစိုးရ) or, simply, Revolutionary Government (တော်လှန်ရေးအစိုးရ).

Formally, on 30 March 1962, the names of the State organs and their members used in the existing laws were renamed as follow:

- the term "Cabinet" (ဝန်ကြီးများအဖွဲ့) was replaced with the term "State Revolutionary Government" (နိုင်ငံတော်တော်လှန်ရေးအစိုးရအဖွဲ့),
- the term "Prime Minister" (ဝန်ကြီးချုပ်) was replaced with the term "Chairman of the State Revolutionary Government" (နိုင်ငံတော်တော်လှန်ရေးအစိုးရအဖွဲ့ဥက္ကဋ္ဌ),
- the term "Minister" (ဝန်ကြီး) was replaced with the term "Member of the State Revolutionary Government" (နိုင်ငံတော်တော်လှန်ရေးအစိုးရအဖွဲ့ဝင်).

Because the terms "Ministry" (ဌာန, lit. 'department of minister') and "Minister" (ဝန်ကြီး) were deemed to be monarchist, they were instead called "Department" (ဌာန) and "Commissar" (ဌာနတာဝန်ခံ, lit. 'person-in-charge of department') respectively during the time of the Revolutionary Government.

The terms "Ministry" and "Minister" were seemed to be restored in 1971 as some laws were amended to replace these two words back.
