= Lists of ambassadors of Myanmar =

List of ambassadors of Myanmar may refer to:

- List of ambassadors of Myanmar to Belgium
- List of ambassadors of Myanmar to Canada
- List of ambassadors of Myanmar to China
- List of ambassadors of Myanmar to France
- List of ambassadors of Myanmar to Germany
- List of ambassadors of Myanmar to India
- List of ambassadors of Myanmar to Malaysia
- List of ambassadors of Myanmar to Russia
- List of ambassadors of Myanmar to the United Kingdom
- List of ambassadors of Myanmar to the United States
