= 1988 in Burma =

- Decades: 1960s; 1970s; 1980s; 1990s; 2000s
- See also: Other events of 1988; History of Myanmar; Timeline

The following lists events that happened during 1988 in the Union of Burma.

== Incumbents ==
- President:
  - until 27 July: San Yu
  - 27 July–12 August: Sein Lwin
  - 12 August–18 August: Aye Ko (interim)
  - 19 August–18 September: Maung Maung
  - starting 18 September: Saw Maung
- Prime Minister:
  - until July 26: Maung Maung Kha
  - July 26-September 18: Tun Tin
  - starting September 18: Saw Maung

== Events ==
=== August ===
- August 6 - The 1988 Myanmar–India earthquake, an M7.3 earthquake struck near the border with India, killing five.
- August 8 - 8888 Uprising
  - Thousands of protestors are killed during anti-government demonstrations.

=== September ===
- September 22 - Saw Maung becomes new general of the military junta in Burma and the streets remain quiet.

=== November ===
- November 6 - The M7.7 and M7.2 1988 Lancang–Gengma earthquakes strikes near the Myanmar–China border, killing at least 938.
