= Myanmar Permanent Representative next the United Nations Office at Geneva =

Coordinates: 46.220999°N 6.147664°E

Ambassador of Myanmar to United Nations Office at Geneva
- Incumbent; Hau Khan Sum since 2017
- Inaugural holder: Win Pe (Burmese diplomat)
- Formation: November 4, 1970

The Myanmar Permanent Representative in Geneva is the official representative of the Government in Naypyidaw next the United Nations Office at Geneva.

== List of representatives ==
Diplomatic agreement/designated/Diplomatic accreditation	Permanent Representative	Observations	Myanmar president	Term end
November 4, 1970	Win Pe	coacredited, residence as Myanmar Ambassador to Italy in Rome	Ne Win	April 25, 1975
August 11, 1976	Thet Tun	residence as Myanmar Ambassador to France in Paris(* 1926)	Ne Win	April 1, 1978
June 19, 1978	Saw Hlaing	residence as Myanmar Ambassador to France in Paris(* 1929)	Ne Win	1981
1984	Maung Maung Gyi	In 1986 he was Myanmar Ambassador to the United States.; In 1957 he was Lieutenant Commander Hydrographer.	San Yu	1985
1985	Tin Tun	accredited 16 July 1985 as Myanmar Ambassador to the United Kingdom.	San Yu	1988
1988	Aung Thant		Saw Maung	1991
1991	Tin Kyaw Hlaing		Saw Maung	1994
1994	Aye		Than Shwe	1999
1999	Mya Than		Than Shwe	2005
2005	Nyunt Maung Shein		Than Shwe	2007
2007	Wunna Maung Lwin		Than Shwe	2011
2011	Maung Wai	In 2000 he was Charge d'affaires of the Myanmar Ambassador in Cambodia.; On January 16, 2017 he was Myanmar Ambassador to India concurrently appointed Myanmar Ambassador to Bhutan.	Thein Sein	2016
2016	Htin Lynn		Htin Kyaw	2017
2017	Hau Khan Sum	Chargé d'affaires	Htin Kyaw	
2017	Hau Khan Sum	Chargé d'affaires	Win Myint	
2017	Hau Khan Sum	Chargé d'affaires	Myint Swe (acting)	
2017	Hau Khan Sum	Chargé d'affaires	Min Aung Hlaing (acting)	
