= U Lwin =

Burmese army officer

Thiri Pyanchi U Lwin
- ဦးလွင်

Secretary of the National League for Democracy
- In office 9 October 1995 – 2010

Member-elect of the Pyithu Hluttaw
- Preceded by: Constituency established
- Succeeded by: Constituency abolished
- Constituency: Thongwa Township
- Majority: 18,189 (68%)

Minister for Finance and Revenue
- In office 1972–1977
- Leader: Ne Win
- Preceded by: San Yu
- Succeeded by: U Than Sein

Personal details
- Born: 22 October 1924 Pazundaung Township, Rangoon, British Burma
- Died: 6 December 2011 (aged 87) Bahan Township, Yangon, Myanmar
- Resting place: Yayway Cemetery, Yangon
- Party: Burma Socialist Programme Party; National League for Democracy
- Children: Su Su Lwin
- Parent(s): Ba Tha; Thein
- Education: Imperial Japanese Army Academy; British Royal Military Academy
- Occupation: Politician

U Lwin (Burmese: ဦးလွင်; 22 October 1924 – 6 December 2011) was a career army officer (ranked Colonel) in the Burmese Army and a National League for Democracy politician, who won a parliamentary seat in the 1990 Burmese general election, after contesting the Thongwa constituency.

U Lwin was born in Rangoon's Pazundaung Township to parents Ba Tha and Thein. He first joined the Burma Independence Army in 1942 and served during World War II and in anti-rebel and anti-Kuomintang campaigns in the 1940s to 1950s, after Burma declared its independence.

After martial law was declared in 1962, he served various roles including Minister of Finance, deputy prime minister and member of the Revolutionary Council under the Burma Socialist Programme Party, until his resignation in 1980.

U Lwin is Secretary of the NLD and is a former party Treasurer. He was among the NLD representatives who boycotted the National Convention in December 1995 and is a former BSPP Deputy Prime Minister and member of the BSPP State Council. He completed high school in Rangoon before World War II and served in the Burma Independence Army (BIA), Burma Defence Army (BDA) and with the Patriotic Burmese Force (PBF) from 1942 to 1945. He completed BDA officer training at the Japanese Royal Military Academy and from 1952 to 1954 studied at the British Royal Military Academy. He was also the Military Attaché to the USA. U Lwin was put under de facto house arrest on 22 September 2000 and released on 1 December 2000.[ Member of CRPP, Chairperson of Committee for Health and Social Affairs ] U Lwin received 18,189 valid votes or 68% in the 1990 elections. { The only original member of the executive committee, who was left after 1990 to help U Aung Shwe in his struggle to keep the NLD intact through the years that threatened its viability as a political party, was U Lwin, the treasurer. U Lwin had joined the Burmese Independence Army as an 18-year-old boy at the outbreak of the war. In August 1943 he was among a batch of Burmese cadets chosen to go to Japan for training at the Rikugun Shikan Gakko (army academy). By the time the young Burmese officers had completed their training in April 1945, the anti-fascist resistance movement had started and U Lwin and his fellow graduates of the military academy remained in Hakone until October 1945, making charcoal which they sold to buy food.

U Lwin continued with his career in the army after independence and was sent on training courses to England and West Germany. In 1959 he was sent to Washington as military attache. On his return from the United States he spent some years as deputy commander of Central Command, then commander of South Eastern Command before he was asked to come back to Rangoon to become a deputy minister. As the military government that assumed power in 1962 took on a civilian garb under the Burmese Socialist Programme Party, U Lwin served successively as minister of finance, deputy prime minister and a member of the state council. It was as a member of the state council that he resigned in 1980.

U Lwin joined the NLD in 1988 and was appointed treasurer because of his experience in finances and his unquestioned integrity. In 1992, when the NLD was forced to reorganize its executive committee, U Lwin took on the post of secretary, while U Aung Shwe became chairman.

He died of natural causes at his home in Yangon's Bahan Township on 7 December 2011. He was subsequently cremated at the Yayway Cemetery.
