= List of ambassadors of Myanmar to Russia =

Coordinates: 55.757133°N 37.592553°E

Ambassador of Myanmar to the Russia Посольство Мьянмы в России Bolshaya Nikitskaya Street 41
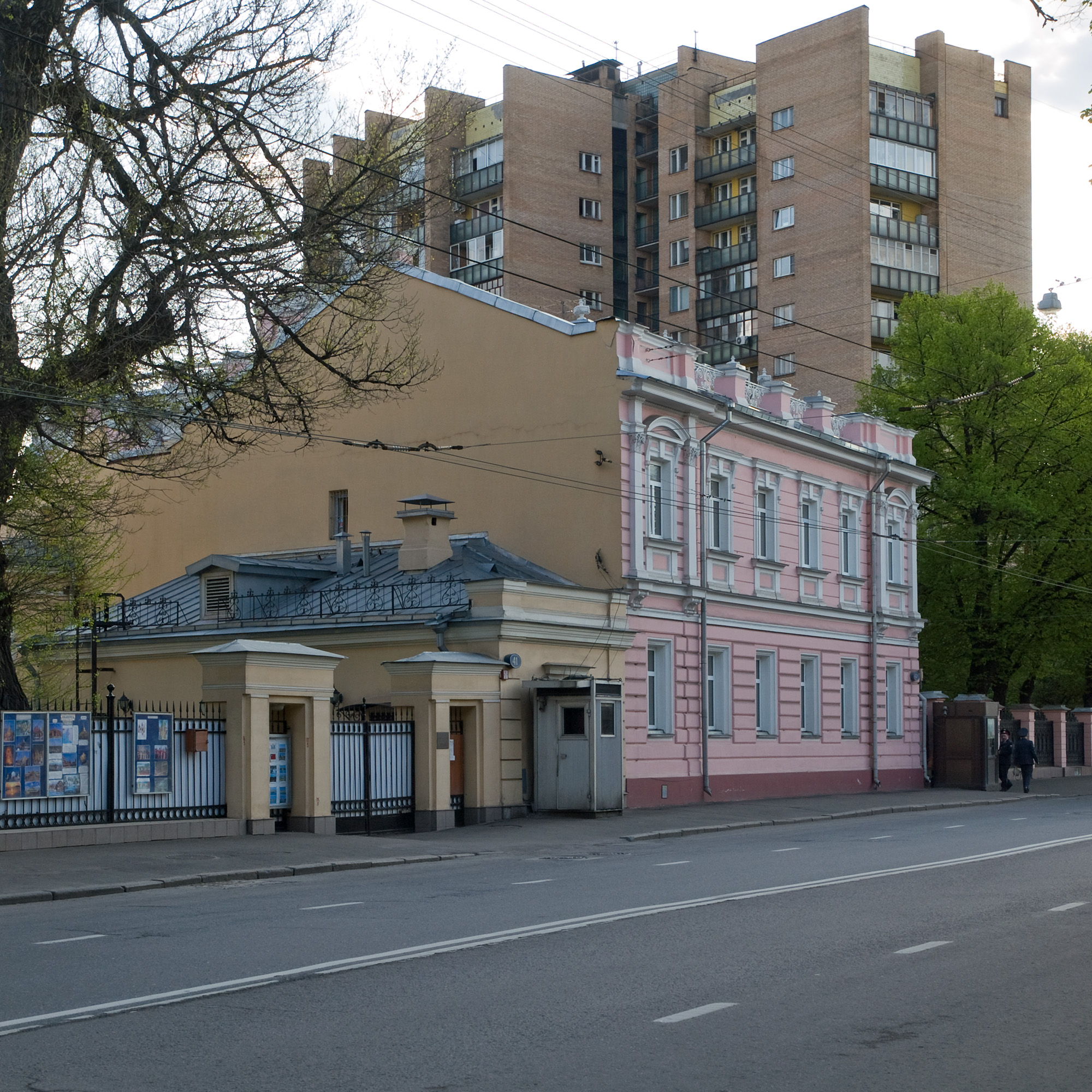
- Incumbent; Ko Ko Shein since June 28, 2017
- Inaugural holder: U Ohn
- Formation: February 16, 1951

The Myanmar Ambassador in Moscow is the official representative of the Government in Naypyidaw to the Government of Russia.

== History ==
- Since 1989 Union of Myanmar

== List of representatives ==
Diplomatic accreditation	Ambassador	Observations	List of presidents of Myanmar	List of presidents of Russia	Term end
February 16, 1951	U Ohn	(*1918) was often referred to by his nickname "San-she-Kodaw" (The long-haired monk) which hits off exactly his combination of Bloomsbury intellectual and Buddhist ascetic. A bachelor, a teetotaller, a vegetarian, he lives in the simplest style, even as Ambassador. A thin, handsome young man with an. appealing smile, he walks with a limp due to a tubercular bone infection, and is not physically strong. After study at Rangoon University he was sent to the Russia just before the war, with the help and influence of Dr. Ba Maw. as a State scholar, and he spent the war years there Almost inevitably he made Communist contacts in the Russia but these did not find him entirely satisfactory. He became friendly, through Mr. Furnivall. with a number of Left-wing intellectuals, such as Dorothy Woodman and Tom Driberg, and after the war canvassed with them energetically on behalf of the Anti-Fascist People's Freedom League, whose unofficial representative in London he was.	Sao Shwe Thaik	Joseph Stalin	1956
January 1, 1956	U Kyin	(25 April 1904 – 2006)	Ba U	Nikita Khrushchev	1962
June 20, 1964	Pe Khin	Thray Sithu U Pe Khin	Ne Win	Leonid Brezhnev	1965
January 1, 1966	Ba Saw	On November 15, 1962 he became Myanmarse Ambassador to the Philippines.	Ne Win	Leonid Brezhnev	1968
February 5, 1968	Kyaw Tun	Thakin Kyaw Tun	Ne Win	Leonid Brezhnev	1965
December 23, 1977	Kyaw Khaing	also accredited in East Berlin.: From November 24, 1980, to November 22, 1982, he was Myanmar Ambassador to the United States.	Ne Win	Leonid Brezhnev	
October 4, 1980	Hla Shwe		Ne Win	Leonid Brezhnev	1981
January 1, 1981	Kyaw Khin		San Yu	Leonid Brezhnev	1984
January 1, 1984	Tin Aye (Burmese diplomat)	Lt. Col.	San Yu	Konstantin Chernenko	1988
January 1, 1986	Kyee Myint	also accredited in East Berlin and Helsinki.	en:San Yu	Andrei Gromyko	1988
January 1, 1988	Tin Tun (Burmase diplomat)	Tin Tun (1988-92	Saw Maung	Mikhail Gorbachev	1992
November 29, 1994	Khin Maung Soe (Burmese diplomat)		Than Shwe	Boris Yeltsin	1996
March 15, 2000	Tin Soe	ТИН СО	Than Shwe	Vladimir Putin	
November 16, 2006	Min Tein	МИН ТЕЙН	Than Shwe	Vladimir Putin	
January 24, 2013	Tin Yu		Thein Sein	Vladimir Putin	
June 28, 2017	Ko Ko Shein	Ко Ко Шейн	Htin Kyaw	Vladimir Putin	

== See also ==
- List of ambassadors of Russia to Myanmar
