= Tin Latt =

Tin Latt may refer to:

- Tin Latt (diplomat) (born 1949), Burmese physician and diplomat
- Tin Latt (minister), Burmese politician and incumbent deputy minister
