= List of ambassadors of Myanmar to the United States =

Coordinates: 38°54′50″N 77°3′2.5″W

Ambassador of Myanmar to the United States Embassy of Myanmar in Washington, D.C.
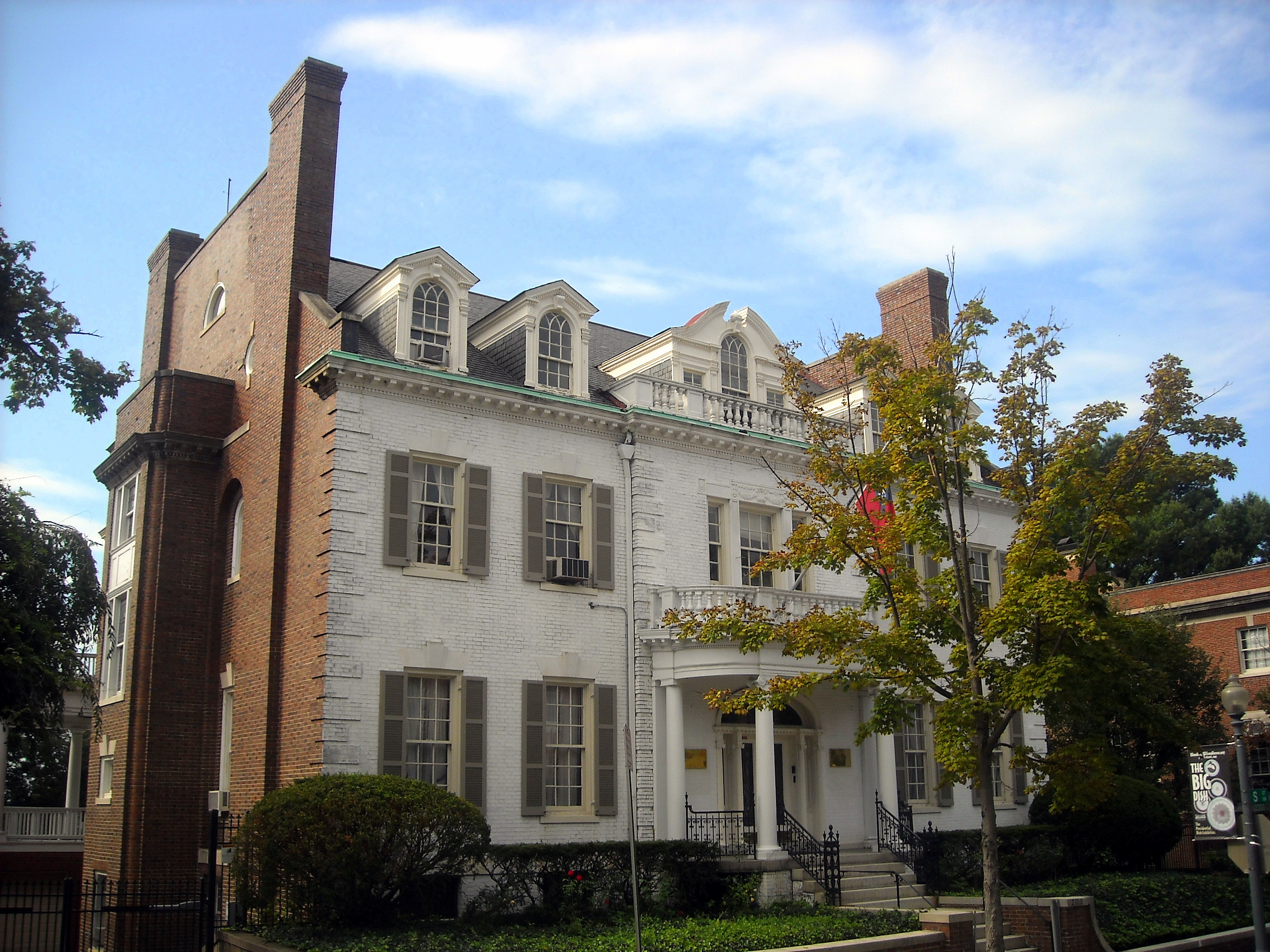
- Inaugural holder: So Nyun
- Formation: December 10, 1947

The Myanmar Ambassador in Washington, D.C. is the official representative of the Government in Naypyidaw to the Government of the United States.

== List of representatives ==
Diplomatic agreement/designated	Diplomatic accreditation	Ambassador	Observations	List of presidents of Myanmar	List of presidents of the United States	Term end
November 21, 1947			Embassy opened	Hubert Rance	Harry S. Truman	
November 21, 1947	December 10, 1947	So Nyun	(*1897) Oxford – educated Barrister-at-law, Mayor of Rangoon, U So Nyun said that he did not think the Chinese population in Burma would sympathize with the Chinese Communists, because they were mostly businessmen and independent craftsmen.	Hubert Rance	Harry S. Truman	
September 27, 1950	October 11, 1950	James Barrington (Burmese diplomat)		Sao Shwe Thaik	Harry S. Truman	
November 30, 1955	December 5, 1955	Win (Burmese diplomat)	(* 15 Feb. 1905) B.A., B. Ed., B. L.; Burmese politician and lawyer; married to Daw Mya Mya Win; s. Khin Maung Win, Tin Maung Win, Bo Bo Win, dau, Tin Tin Win *until 1942 educationist.: formerly President, Trade Union Congress of Burma; Minister for Home Affairs, Religions Affairs and Defence; member (Soc.), Chamber of Deputies.; October 9, 1958 co-accredited as Myanmar Ambassador to Canada.	Ba U	Dwight D. Eisenhower	
August 21, 1959	August 21, 1959	Ohn Sein	Education Minister U Than Aung became Myanmar Ambassador to India and Member of Parliament U Ohn Sein Myanmar Ambassador to Pakistan, both as Ambassadors in 1956. U Than Aung retired from New Delhi, Sithu U Ohn Sein moved in 1959 to Washington.; October 9, 1959 co-accredited as Myanmar Ambassador to Canada.	Win Maung	Dwight D. Eisenhower	
February 21, 1966	February 25, 1966	Tun Win	Till January 1966 editor of the organ of the AFPFL, Mandaing daily newspaper.; was Minister for Information in U Nu's government	Ne Win	Lyndon B. Johnson	
June 18, 1969	June 27, 1968	Hla Maung	(* September 20, 1911 at Meiktila).: (ICS 1935; assistant warden, Chauk; during the war served as secretary to the government),	Ne Win	Richard Nixon	
January 15, 1970	February 20, 1970	San Maung	*From 1981 to 1984 he was Myanmar Ambassador to Serbia.	Ne Win	Richard Nixon	
May 5, 1972		Win (Burmese diplomat)	Chargé d'affaires	Ne Win	Richard Nixon	
June 28, 1972	July 21, 1972	Lwin	(*10 Dec. 1912) Burmese diplomatist and politician.: married, two sons. two daughters.; fmr. officer, Burma army; Mil. Adviser, Burma Del. to UN Gen. Assembly 1953; From 1966 to 1971 he was Myanmar Ambassador to Germany, also to Netherlands 1969-71.; From 1971 to 1972 he was Myanmar Permanent Representative next the Headquarters of the United Nations; From 1972 to 1975 he was Minister for Planning and Finance.; From 1975 to 1977 he was Minister for Information.; From 1974 to 1977 he was Deputy Prime Minister.; In 1977 he was withdrawn from Cen. Cttee. of Burma Socialist Programme Party.; Gen. Sec. Nat. League for Democracy (NLD).	Ne Win	Richard Nixon	
August 7, 1975	September 3, 1975	Tin Lat	1971 first secretary of the Burmese Embassy in Peking	Ne Win	Gerald Ford	
July 12, 1978	August 2, 1978	Hla Shwe		Ne Win	Jimmy Carter	
September 26, 1980	November 24, 1980	Kyaw Khaing	1975 he was Deputy Minister for Labour U Kyaw Khaing: November 24, 1982 co-accredited as Myanmar Ambassador to Canada.	Ne Win	Jimmy Carter	
September 24, 1982	November 22, 1982	Kyee Myint	In 1981:The Argentina Government has agreed to the appointment of U Kyaw Khaing as Myanmar Ambassador to Argentina.; November 22, 1984 co-accredited as Myanmar Ambassador to Canada.	San Yu	Ronald Reagan	
August 31, 1984	November 26, 1984	Maung Maung Gyi (Burmese diplomat)	( * September 20, 1920 in Henzada, Burma, July 2, 1988 in Lewiston, Maine): will be remembered in many ways: as the author of Burmese Political Values.; In 1971 he was First Secretary in London.; November 26, 1984 co-accredited as Myanmar Ambassador to Canada.; U Maung Maung Gyi (1855–1933), the last court harpist, was given the title Deiwa-Einda (“Heavenly Musician”)	San Yu	Ronald Reagan	
July 31, 1986	September 15, 1986	Myo Aung		San Yu	Ronald Reagan	
July 19, 1991	August 6, 1991	Thaung	Daw Thaung: May 21, 1992 co-accredited as Myanmese Ambassador to Canada.	Saw Maung	George H. W. Bush	
August 28, 1996	October 9, 1996	Tin Winn	Minister of the prime ministers office of detention of General Khin Nyunt sent to retirement on 24 October 2004.	Than Shwe	Bill Clinton	
May 30, 2001	June 20, 2001	Linn Myaing	graduated from the Defense Services Academy with a Bachelor of Science degree.; In 1993 he was transferred from the Navy to the Ministry of Foreign Affairs.; He was, Myanmese Ambassador to France with concurrent accreditations to Switzerland, Belgium and the Netherlands.; Headed the Myanmar Delegation to the European Union in Brussels and Permanent Delegate of Myanmar to UNESCO in Paris.; He serves as a Director of Serge Pun & Associates (Myanmar) Limited.; He held positions in the Foreign Service include Minister, Deputy Permanent Representative at the Permanent Mission of Myanmar to the UN Office in Geneva.; Deputy Director of the Americas Division, Political Department.; During his diplomatic career, he attended many UN related fora, including UN General Assembly Sessions in New York.; In 2000 headed the Myanmar Delegation to the Sixth Meeting of the UN Framework Convention on Climate Change Conferences of the Parties held in the Hague, Netherlands.; serves as the Chief Operating Officer of First Myanmar Investment Co., Ltd.; Mr. Myaing serves as Managing Director of Myanmar Agri - Tech Carbon Capital Ltd. since 2006 served as an Advisor of Serge Pun & Associates (Myanmar) Limited (also known as SPA (Myanmar) Ltd.) and the Group Public Relations and Protocol Department.: since November 2011 he headed the Corporate Secretariat Department at Myanmar.	Than Shwe	George W. Bush	
July 25, 2012	July 30, 2012	Than Swe	(* June 19, 1953): In 1975 BA Burma Defence Services Academy.; In 2000 MA in Defense Studies. Leaving the military, From May 2000 to March 2008 he was director general for the Progress of Border Areas and National Races in the Ministry of Progress of Border Areas and National Races and Development Affairs	Thein Sein	Barack Obama	2016
September 27, 2013	December 3, 2013	Kyaw Myo Htut	(* 1957): In 2008 he changed from the Burmese Army to the Foreign Ministry; In 2009 he was deputy permanent representative to the United Nations mission Geneva and defended the position of the Myanma government against European Union criticisms of its treatment of Nobel Peace Prize winner Aung San Suu Kyu.; From 2011 to 2012 he was Mynamese Ambassador to the United Kingdom.	Thein Sein	Barack Obama	2016
July 18, 2016	September 16, 2016	Aung Lynn	(*Feb. 9, 1958 in Yangon )	Htin Kyaw	Barack Obama	2018

== See also ==
- Myanmar–United States relations
