= James Barrington =

James Barrington may refer to:

- James Barrington (diplomat) (1911–1992), Burmese diplomat
- Jimmy Barrington (1901–after 1937), English footballer
- James Barrington (cricketer) (1960–2025), English cricketer
