= Tun Tin =

Prime Minister of Burma (1988)

Thura U Tun Tin
- ထွန်းတင်

Prime Minister of Burma
- In office 26 July 1988 – 18 September 1988
- President: Sein Lwin; Aye Ko; Maung Maung
- Preceded by: Maung Maung Kha
- Succeeded by: Saw Maung

Minister of Finance
- In office 1977–1988
- Preceded by: Than Sein
- Succeeded by: Maung Maung Khin

Personal details
- Born: 2 October 1920 Myitkyina, British Raj
- Died: 1 May 2020 (aged 99) Yangon, Myanmar
- Party: Burma Socialist Programme Party
- Spouse: Myint Myint Thein
- Children: 3
- Education: Mandalay College

Military service
- Allegiance: Myanmar
- Branch/service: Myanmar Army
- Rank: Brigadier General

Thura U Tun Tin (Burmese: ထွန်းတင်, pronounced [tʰʊ́ɰ̃ tɪ̀ɰ̃]; 2 October 1920 – 1 May 2020) was a Burmese politician who served as Prime Minister of Burma from July 1988 to September 1988.

== Biography ==
He was born in Myitkyina in October 1920. He graduated with a bachelor's degree from Mandalay College in 1941. He was a Thakin of Do-Bama-Asiayone and student underground movement leader against the British.

In 1942 he joined the Burma Independence Army and attended officer training school (3rd batch) during Japanese occupation of Burma. He continued to serve in Burma army after its independence from the British. He was awarded "Thura" title for his bravery during Battle of Insein against the Karen insurgency in 1949.

In 1950 he attended a provost marshal course in the United Kingdom. He later served as provost-marshal of the Burmese Army.

After 1962 he briefly served in the Labor Ministry as director-general and later as Secretary of Ministry of Labor and Mines. After that he served as Director of Military Training and Planning in Ministry of Defence till 1972.

In 1972 he was appointed as Deputy Minister of Co-operatives in General Ne Win's government. He also retired from the army in the same year. In 1974, he was appointed as Minister of Labor and later in 1975 as Minister of Co-operatives in BSPP government under Prime Minister Sein Win.

In 1977 he was appointed as Minister for Planning and Finance during cabinet reshuffle. In 1978, he was appointed as Deputy Prime Minister and Minister for Planning and Finance under BSPP government of Prime Minister Maung Maung Kha and served in that position until 1988. In June 1988, he was appointed as Prime Minister during the 8888 Uprising. He served as the official head of government of Burma until the military takeover of the country a few months later.

Tun Tin died on 1 May 2020 at No. 2 Military Hospital, Yangon, five months short of his 100th birthday.

Political offices
| Preceded by Maung Maung Kha | Prime Minister of Burma; 26 July 1988 – 18 September 1990 | Succeeded by Saw Maung; Chairman of the State Peace and Development Council |
