= List of ambassadors of Myanmar to Canada =

Coordinates: 45.397619°N 75.744054°W

Ambassador of Myanmar to Canada
- Inaugural holder: U Win
- Formation: October 9, 1958

The Myanmar Ambassador in Ottawa is the official representative of the Government in Naypyidaw to the Government of Canada.

== History ==
- Since 1989 Union of Myanmar

== List of representatives ==
Diplomatic accreditation	Ambassador	Observations	List of presidents of Myanmar	List of prime ministers of Canada	Term end
October 9, 1958	Win (Burmese diplomat)	Myanmar Ambassador to the United States	Win Maung	John Diefenbaker	
October 9, 1959	Ohn Sein	Myanmar Ambassador to the United States	Win Maung	John Diefenbaker	
February 11, 1963	James Barrington (Burmese diplomat)		Ne Win	Lester Pearson	
January 16, 1970	Thakin Chan Tun		Ne Win	Pierre Trudeau	
August 28, 1975	Kyaw Nyunt		Ne Win	Pierre Trudeau	
July 4, 1977	Ko Ko (Burmese diplomat)		Ne Win	Pierre Trudeau	
November 24, 1982	Kyaw Khine	Myanmar Ambassador to the United States	San Yu	Pierre Trudeau	
November 22, 1984	Kyee Myint	Myanmar Ambassador to the United States	San Yu	John Turner	
November 26, 1984	Maung Maung Gyi (Burmese diplomat)	Myanmar Ambassador to the United States	San Yu	John Turner	
March 19, 1986	Ba Thwin		San Yu	Brian Mulroney	
June 14, 1988	Thein Aung		Saw Maung	Brian Mulroney	
July 19, 1989	Win Shein		Saw Maung	Brian Mulroney	
May 21, 1992	Thaung	Myanmar Ambassador to the United States	Than Shwe	Brian Mulroney	
September 20, 1995	Kyaw Win		Than Shwe	Jean Chrétien	
December 15, 1999	Nyunt Tin		Than Shwe	Jean Chrétien	
May 27, 2004	Aye (Burmese diplomat)		Than Shwe	Paul Martin	
April 19, 2011	Kyaw Tin		Thein Sein	Stephen Harper	
June 10, 2013	Hau Do Suan		Thein Sein	Stephen Harper	
November 21, 2016	Kyaw Myo Htut		Htin Kyaw	Justin Trudeau	2018
