= List of ambassadors of Myanmar to Malaysia =

Coordinates: 3.158745°N 101.730692°E

Ambassador of Myanmar to Malaysia
- Incumbent; Sein Oo since February 15, 2017
- Style: His Excellency
- Seat: Kuala Lumpur, Malaysia
- Inaugural holder: Mya Sein as Chargé d'affaires
- Formation: June 1, 1959
- Website: www.myanmarembassykl.org

The ambassador of the Republic of the Union of Myanmar to Malaysia is the head of Myanmar's diplomatic mission to Malaysia. The position has the rank and status of an ambassador extraordinary and plenipotentiary and is based in the Embassy of Myanmar, Kuala Lumpur.

== List of heads of mission ==
=== Ambassadors to Malaysia ===
Diplomatic accreditation	Ambassador	Observations	List of presidents of Myanmar	Prime Minister of Malaysia	Term end
June 1, 1959	Daw Mya Sein	Chargé d'affaires	Win Maung	Tunku Abdul Rahman	
May 15, 1962	Daw Mya Sein	Mya Sein started out as the first envoy to France in 1948.: From 1955 to 1964, she was Chargé d'affaires of the Burmese Ambassador to Indonesia.; In 1967 he was Burmese Ambassador to New Zealand U Nyo Tun would succeed U Mya Sein, who returned to Burma in March this year on completion of his tour of duty.	Ne Win	Tunku Abdul Rahman	
August 3, 1964	Pe Khin		Ne Win	Tunku Abdul Rahman	
February 20, 1971	Hla Maw	*In 1971 he was Burmese Ambassador to India. Hla Maw became Ambassador in Kuala Lumpur in 1963 and in New Delhi in 1976 until 1971 when he retired.	Ne Win	Abdul Razak Hussein	
August 5, 1975	Thet Tin		Ne Win	Abdul Razak Hussein	
July 11, 1978	Kyi (Burmese diplomat)		Ne Win	Abdul Razak Hussein	
November 7, 1981	Myint Aung (Burmese diplomat)		San Yu	Mahathir Mohamad	
October 29, 1984	Thein Toe		San Yu	Mahathir Mohamad	
November 17, 1988	Ba Nyunt		Saw Maung	Mahathir Mohamad	
December 30, 1990	Ko (Burmese diplomat)		Saw Maung	Mahathir Mohamad	
February 5, 1993	Sein Lwin (Burmese diplomat)		Than Shwe	Mahathir Mohamad	
April 24, 1997	Saw Tun		Than Shwe	Mahathir Mohamad	
April 19, 2001	Hla Maung		Than Shwe	Mahathir Mohamad	
August 30, 2005	Myint Aung (Burmese diplomat)		Than Shwe	Abdullah Ahmad Badawi	
November 6, 2006	Tin Latt		Than Shwe	Abdullah Ahmad Badawi	
March 25, 2015	Zaw Myint		Thein Sein	Najib Razak	
February 15, 2017	Sein Oo	22.08.2017 accredited.	Htin Kyaw	Najib Razak	

== See also ==
- Malaysia–Myanmar relations
