= Tin Oo =

Burmese general and politician (1927–2024)

General Thura Tin Oo
- တင်ဦး
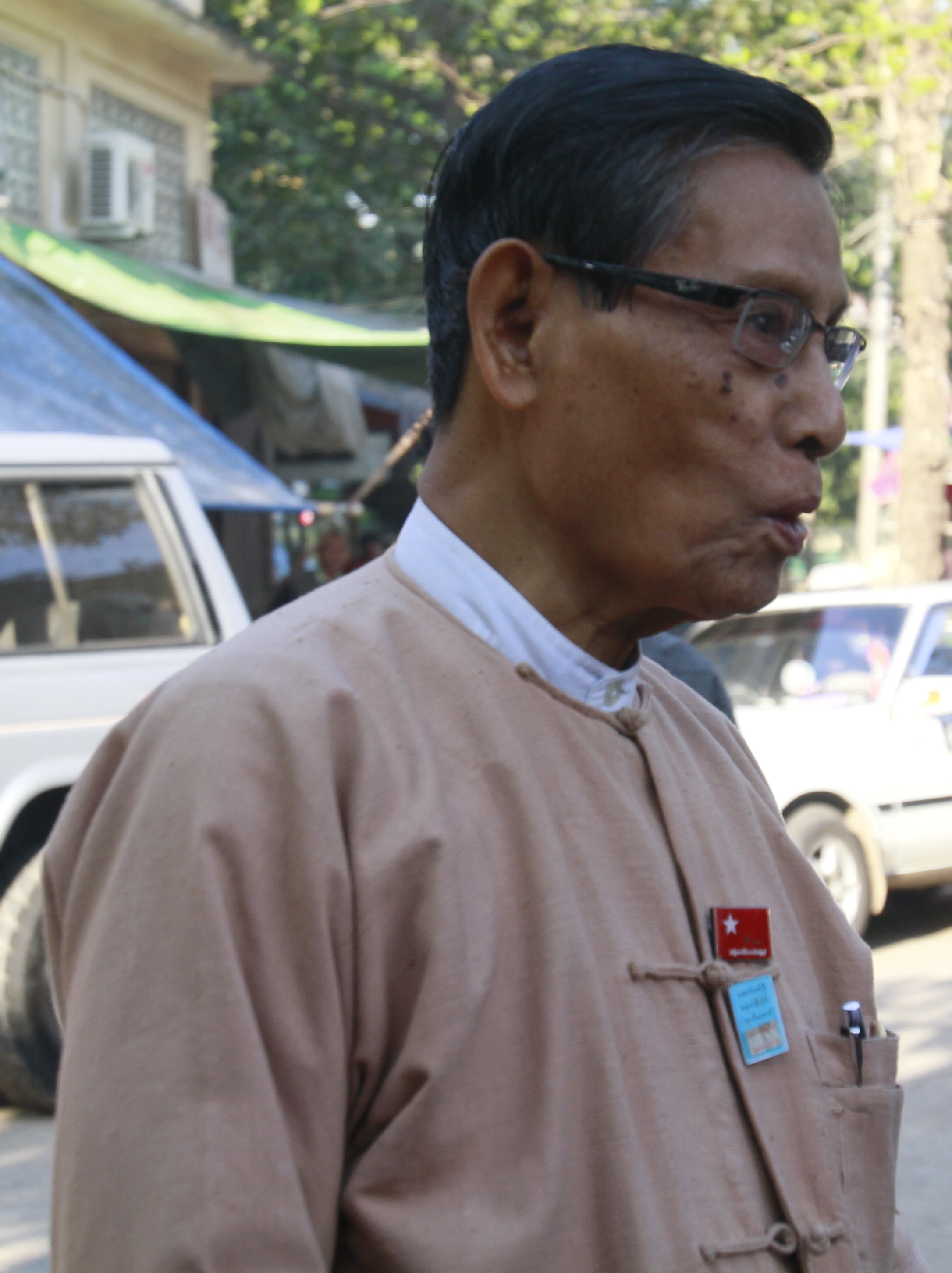
- Tin Oo in 2012

President of the National League for Democracy
- In office 3 December 1988 – 21 December 1990
- Leader: Aung San Suu Kyi
- Preceded by: Aung Gyi
- Succeeded by: Aung Shwe

Minister of Defence
- In office 8 March 1974 – 6 March 1977
- Prime Minister: Sein Win
- Preceded by: San Yu
- Succeeded by: Kyaw Htin

Commander in Chief of the Armed Forces
- In office 8 March 1974 – 6 March 1976
- Preceded by: San Yu
- Succeeded by: Kyaw Htin

Personal details
- Born: 11 March 1927 Bassein, Irrawaddy Division, Burma Province, British India
- Died: 1 June 2024 (aged 97) Yangon, Myanmar
- Party: National League for Democracy
- Spouse: Tin Moe Wai
- Children: Thant Zin Oo
- Education: Officers Training School, Bahtoo

Military service
- Allegiance: Myanmar
- Branch/service: Burmese Army
- Years of service: 1945–1976
- Rank: General
- Commands: Officer Commanding of No. (13) Infantry Brigade (1959); General Officer Commanding of South West Regional Military Command(1962); General Officer Commanding of Central Regional Military Command (1964); Deputy Chief of Staff (1972); Commander-in-Chief of Defence Services(1974)
- Awards: Thuya Medal

Tin Oo (Burmese: တင်ဦး, IPA: [tɪ̀ɰ̃ ʔú]; 11 March 1927 – 1 June 2024), often referred to as U Tin Oo, was a Burmese politician, activist, and general in the Armed Forces who was one of the founders of the National League for Democracy (NLD) in Myanmar, the country's largest pro-democracy political party.

== Military career ==
Tin Oo joined the military on 26 February 1946 as a second lieutenant in Burma Rifles Battalion. He reached the ranks of lieutenant on 7 January 1947, captain on 27 September 1948 and served as executive officer at Armed Forces Training Headquarters. On 22 June 1949, he was transferred to No. 1 Burma Rifles Battalion as company commander. He was promoted to the rank of major on 25 January 1950 and became deputy battalion commander (2IC) of the No. 1 Burma Rifles Battalion and took over the position of acting battalion commander on 27 November 1952.

Tin Oo was promoted to lieutenant colonel on 21 January 1954 and became commander of the 4th Infantry Brigade on 30 May 1957. He was then transferred to Officers Training School, Bahtoo as commandant on 13 September 1957. Throughout 1958 and 1961, he served as the battalion commander for the No. 14 Infantry Battalion (starting 18 November 1959) and No. 2 Burma Rifle Battalion (from 16 February 1962) and after his promotion as colonel, he became acting commander for the No. 13 Infantry Brigade (from 20 February 1962).

Tin Oo was then given the command of South West Regional Military Command and promoted to the rank of colonel on 14 February 1964. On 19 September 1964, he became commander of Central Regional Military Command. He was then promoted to the rank of brigadier general and became deputy chief of staff of the Tatmadaw on 20 April 1972. On 8 March 1974 he was promoted to the rank of general and became commander in chief of the Tatmadaw. He was armed forces commander in chief during the bloody crackdown on student protests surrounding the funeral of former UN Secretary-General U Thant.

During his military career, Tin Oo was awarded the Thura medal, a prestigious award for gallantry and bravery in the face of the enemy that can be awarded to members of the Myanmar Armed Forces. He led both tactical and strategic campaigns against the Karen National Union as well as the Communist Party of Burma and various ethnic armed groups, especially in the north and east of the country.

== Forced retirement, accusations and imprisonment ==
On 6 March 1976, as per Order no. 26/76 issued by the Council of State, Tin Oo was forced to retire from his position as Commander in Chief of the Tatmadaw. According to the official explanation released by the then ruling party, the Burma Socialist Programme Party, he was forced to retire because Dr. Daw Tin Moe Wai, his wife, broke the rules and regulations laid down for the spouses of commanding officers of the Tatmadaw by accepting numerous bribes, thus affecting General Tin Oo's position.

After his forced retirement, he was accused of high treason against the armed forces, the party (BSPP) and the state. He was subsequently arrested and tried for the alleged withholding of information concerning a failed coup-d'état against General Ne Win and the Council of State. On 11 January 1977, Judge U Ohn Maung, Chairman of the Divisional Justice Committee for the Yangon Division sentenced him to 7 years of hard labour and imprisonment according to the Crime Against State and High Treasons Act 124. Tin Oo's subsequent appeal of this judgement on 20 August 1977 was summarily dismissed by Judge Soe Hlaing of the Council of People's Justice, the equivalent of a Supreme Court, and upheld the judgement handed out by Yangon Division Justice Committee. Colonel Hla Pe, commander of Northern Regional Command, Colonel Maung Maung, Colonel General Staff and Colonel Myo Aung, commandant of the National Defence College were also dismissed and the former two were imprisoned along with General Tin Oo.

== Political career ==
Tin Oo was released under general amnesty in 1980, after which he studied and received a degree in law. On 2 September 1988, he became the vice president of the National League for Democracy (NLD), and on 20 December, the President of NLD. On 20 July 1989, he was put under house arrest and starting on 22 December 1989, he was imprisoned for three years.

On 30 May 2003, Tin Oo, travelling with the caravan of Aung San Suu Kyi, leader of the NLD, was attacked in the northern village of Depayin by a government-sponsored mob, murdering and wounding many of his supporters. Tin Oo was taken into detention along with Aung San Suu Kyi and was initially held in prison in Kalay in northwestern Myanmar. In February 2004 he was brought back to his home in Yangon, where he was actually held under house arrest. The junta extended his detention by one year in February 2007, 2008, and 2009. The last of these extensions was in violation of Burmese law at the time, but no explanation was given by the junta. He was released from house arrest on 13 February 2010.

After restrictions on the NLD were lifted in 2010, Tin Oo continued to work in the party and participated in campaigning for the 2015 Myanmar general election, which the NLD won by the landslide. He was floated as a possible candidate for the presidency but declined, saying that he preferred to help Aung San Suu Kyi "as much as I can". Following the 2021 Myanmar coup d'état, Tin Oo remained in his residence in Yangon, where he was visited by junta leader Min Aung Hlaing, and later a pro-junta Buddhist monk who suggested that Aung San Suu Kyi retire from politics. The latter incident led to his family announcing a ban on visitors.

== Death ==
Tin Oo died in Yangon on 1 June 2024, at the age of 97. He had been hospitalised since 29 May with pneumonia. Over 1,000 people attended his funeral.

== Books written about U Tin Oo ==
Former Commander in Chief of Who Was Loved by The People Thura U Tin Oo (ပြည်သူချစ်သောတပ်မတော်ကာကွယ်ရေးဦးစီးချုပ်ဟောင်း သူရဦးတင်ဦး) by Phoe Sai

Myanmar's Democracy Road and Thura U Tin Oo (မြန်မာ့ဒီမိုကရေစီခရီးနှင့်သူရဦးတင်ဦး) by University Sein Tin

== See also ==
- Military of Myanmar
- Myanmar Army
- National League for Democracy

== Notes ==
Military offices
Preceded by San Yu	Commander in Chief of the Armed Forces; 1974–1976	Succeeded by Kyaw Htin
Political offices
Preceded by San Yu	Minister of Defence; 1974–1977	Succeeded by Kyaw Htin
Party political offices
Preceded by Aung Gyi	Chairperson of the National League for Democracy; 1988–1990	Succeeded by Aung Shwe
