= List of ambassadors of Myanmar to India =

Diplomats of Myanmar to India

Moe Kyaw Aung

Myanmar Ambassador to India
- Incumbent
- Assumed office 22 December 2017
- President: Myint Swe (acting)
- Preceded by: Maung Wai

The Myanmar Ambassador in New Delhi is the official representative of the Government in Naypyidaw to the Government of India.

== List of representatives ==
Diplomatic accreditation	Ambassador	Observations	List of presidents of Myanmar	List of prime ministers of India	Term end
1947	Win (Burmese diplomat)		Sao Shwe Thaik	Jawaharlal Nehru	
1949	Sir Maung Gyee		Sao Shwe Thaik	Jawaharlal Nehru	1950
1951	U Kyin	Maha Thray Sithu U Kyin, the new Burmese Ambassador to India, presents credentials to President Rajendra Prasad at New Delhi.: From May 21, 1955, to 1956 he was Myanmar Ambassador to the United Kingdom.	Sao Shwe Thaik	Jawaharlal Nehru	May 21, 1955
May 21, 1955	Aung Soe	Sithu U Aung Soe, a former member of the Indian Civil Service, has been appointed Burmese Ambassador to India.	Ba U	Jawaharlal Nehru	
May 19, 1960	Khin Kyi	(*April 16, 1912 in Myaungmya-December 27, 1988): From 1960 to 1967 she was ambassadrice in New Delhi, diplomatist, widow of Bogyoke Aung San mother of Aung San Suu Kyi; She was the daughter of U Po Hnyn, Public Works Minister.; She was concurrently appointed to Nepal.	Win Maung	Jawaharlal Nehru	1967
1969	Hla Maw	Also acreddited to Nepal.; General Ne Win accompanied by Madame Ne Win, Indian Ambassador Designate to Burma Shri Baleshwar Prasad, Burmese Ambassador to India U Hla Maw and Party of 23 officials, flew into Gaya in an Indian Force plane on January 20.	Ne Win	Indira Gandhi	1971
1971	Ba Shwe	From 1966 to 1970 he was Myanmar Ambassador to Japan.; From 1971 to 1976 he was ambassador in New Delhi.; In 1976 he was retired.	Ne Win	Indira Gandhi	1978
June 22, 1978	Mg Mg Shin	Maung Maung Shin, Group Captain, A new Burmese envoy, V Maung Shin presented his credentials to President Reddi in New Delhi on 22 June 1978	Ne Win	Morarji Desai	1981
1982	Ko Ko Lay	(*1926) Colonel, Retired senior Army Colonel U Ko Ko Lay was appointed Burmese Ambassador to India, replacing the present incumbent, U Maung Maung Shin. U Ko Ko Lay (56) was earlier director of supply and transport in the Defence Ministry since 1975.	San Yu	Indira Gandhi	1984
1985	Than Lwin	Lt. Colonel	San Yu	Rajiv Gandhi	1987
1989	Saw Hlaing	(* 14 March 1932 in Pyinmana): spouse Dr. Myanmar (Burma) — Ambassador, U. Saw Hlaing, Plot No. 3, Block No. 50F. Shantipath, Chanakyapuri; From September 30, 2005, he was Myanmar Ambassador to France.; The lone civilian U Saw Hlaing served a year in Paris as Ambassador, then two years in Geneva and four years in New York as Myanmaes Permanent Representative next the United Nations Headquarter.; In 1989 he was sent as Ambassador to New Delhi from where he retired in 1992.	Saw Maung	Vishwanath Pratap Singh	1992
February 3, 1992	Wynn Lwin	U Wynn Lwin served as Ambassador of Myanmar to India during 1992 – 99 India and was also accredited to Iran, Mauritius and Nigeria., at this time was quite critical of the military regime in Myanmar which was evident from the remark given by the President of India R. Venkataraman in February 1992 when the newly appointed Myanmar	Than Shwe	P. V. Narasimha Rao	1999
April 12, 1999	Tin Latt		Than Shwe	Atal Bihari Vajpayee	
November 1, 2003	Kyi Thein		Than Shwe	Atal Bihari Vajpayee	December 1, 2010
June 16, 2011	Zin Yaw	*August 12, 2011: On January 7, 2016 he was deputy transport minister.	Thein Sein	Manmohan Singh	April 27, 2012
December 18, 2013	Aung Khin Soe	22.07.2014 he was Myanmar Ambassador to Iran.; On 11.03.2016 he was Myanmar Ambassador to Bhutan.	Thein Sein	Narendra Modi	
January 17, 2017	Maung Wai	He was Myanmar Ambassador to India, Iran and Bhutan.	Htin Kyaw	Narendra Modi	
December 22, 2017	Moe Kyaw Aung	U Moe Kyaw Aung is the current Myanmar Ambassador to India, Bhutan and Iran.; 22-12-2017: The Ambassador presented his credentials to the President of India.; 22-6-2018: The Ambassador presented his credentials to His Majesty The King of Bhutan.; 9-3-2019: The Ambassador presented his credentials to President of the Islamic Republic of Iran.	Htin Kyaw	Narendra Modi	22-12-2017 to date

== See also ==
- India–Myanmar relations
