= Pe Khin =

Burmese diplomat

Myanmar Ambassador to Pakistan
- In office 1947–1952

Myanmar Ambassador to Thailand
- In office 1952–1956

Myanmar Ambassador to the Headquarters of the United Nations
- In office 1956–1958
- Preceded by: Win
- Succeeded by: U Thant

Myanmar Ambassador to Egypt
- In office 1958–1962
- Succeeded by: Myint Lwin

Myanmar Ambassador to Russia
- In office 1964–1965
- Preceded by: U Kyin
- Succeeded by: U Ba Saw

Myanmar Ambassador to Singapore
- In office August 1966 – 1972

Personal details
- Born: 27 August 1912 Swehman village, Pyawbwe Township, Mandalay Division, British Burma
- Died: 25 February 2004 (aged 91)
- Education: Wesleyan School; Rangoon University
- Occupation: Politician

Pe Khin (Burmese: ဖေခင်; 27 August 1912 – 25 February 2004) was a Burmese diplomat. He was one of the main negotiators at the Panglong Conference in Burma and the architect of the historical Panglong Agreement.

== Early life ==
Pe Khin was born in Swehman village, Pyawbwe Township, modern day Mandalay Region to A.A. Khan (U Bo Galay) and Daw Toke on 27 August 1912. He studied Urdu at Swe Hman village Primary School and passed the fourth standard examination.

He passed the seventh standard examination at Pyawbwe Township's Wesleyan School and matriculation examination at the Kelly School in Mandalay. He also stayed at the Bago Hostel, together with the future founder of modern Burma Aung San, and received a B.A. and B.L. from Rangoon University. He worked at the labour office in the Chauk Petroleum oil field in 1938.

== Political beginnings ==
In January 1946, he attended the first convention of the Anti-Fascist People's Freedom League (AFPFL) as a delegate from the Burma Muslim Congress. The seventh proposal at the convention was made by Pe Khin, who proposed that the frontier areas and ethnic groups be joined together with the Burmese interim government to achieve independence. It became one of the main points of the Panglong Agreement. Pe Khin later became a Central Executive Member of the AFPFL and was appointed as their secretary for ethnic minorities in Burma.

He was elected as a Member of Parliament representing the Phaw Bawl Township in the April 1947 constituent assembly elections. He was the main lobbyist behind a letter by Mandalay leaders requesting that Aung San appoint U Razak for a cabinet post.

After Aung San left the Panglong Conference disappointed and frustrated on 12 April 1947, Pe Khin was able to persuade Aung San to stay for another night and to allow him to negotiate with the ethnic minority leaders. Pe Khin successfully negotiated with them and so, U Aung Zan Wai, Bo Khin Maung Galay, U Pe Khin, Bo Hmu Aung, Sir Maung Gyi, Dr. Sein Mya Maung, Myoma U Than Kywe all signed the subsequent Panglong Agreement, an important document which would eventually lead to independence from the British and the creation of the Union of Burma.

Aung San and several members of his cabinet were killed while meeting in the Secretariat Building on 19 July 1947, in an assassination orchestrated by U Saw, a conservative pre-war Prime Minister of Burma. Pe Khin then became a minister in the newly formed cabinet of Thakin Nu.

== Diplomatic career ==
Pe Khin was appointed as Burma's first Ambassador to Pakistan in 1947. He was then sent as the Ambassador to Thailand from 1953 to 1956. In 1964 he was transferred to the Soviet Union and in 1966 to Singapore. After 25 years of diplomatic service he retired in 1972.

== Activities in NGOs ==
Pe Khin was active in the Burma Muslim Congress from 1945, together with U Razak and Khin Maung Latt. He was also a patron of the Burma Islamic Council and Burmese Muslim Organization.

== Published books ==
- Panglong, An Inside Story
- AFPFL convention
- Seed of the Panglong Conference
- Burma and the Non-aligned policy
- ... and numerous articles in English and Burmese

== Awards ==
- "Maha Tharaesithu" in the First Honours list given out by the Burmese government after independence.
- Country's Honour First Grade on 7 June 1980.
