= List of ambassadors of Myanmar to China =

Coordinates: 9.941072°N 116.460650°E

Ambassador of Myanmar to China
- Incumbent; U Myo Thant Pe since November 22, 2019
- Inaugural holder: Myint Thein (Burmese diplomat)
- Formation: 1950

The Myanmar Ambassador in Beijing is the official representative of the Government in Naypyidaw to the Government of China.

== List of representatives ==
Ambassador	Diplomatic agreement/designated	Diplomatic accreditation	Observations	List of presidents of Myanmar	Premier of the People's Republic of China	Term end
	1950	June 8, 1950	The governments in Beijing and Yangon established diplomatic relations.	U Nu	Zhou Enlai	
Myint Thein (Burmese diplomat)	1950			U Nu	Zhou Enlai	
Hla Maung	1951		ex-ICS and first chairman of the Burma Economic Aid Committee, an inter-scorotarial committee appointed by the Cabinet to serve as the opposite number to the U.S. Special and Technical Economic Mission to Burma (ECA, MSA, TCA)	U Nu	Zhou Enlai	1958
Maung Maung Kyaw Win	1959		concurrently as Minister to Mongolia	Ne Win	Zhou Enlai	1964
Samar Duwah Sin Wah Naung	1964			Ne Win	Zhou Enlai	1967
Thein Maung	1970		(1890–1975)U Thein Maung became the second chief justice of the Supreme Court (formal term Chief Justice of the Union of Burma) some time in 1952 when Chief Justice Sir Ba U retired and became president. Hence U Thein Maung was the second3	Ne Win	Zhou Enlai	1974
Thakin Chan Tun	1974			Sein Win (Brigadier General)	Zhou Enlai	1976
Myint Maung (Burmese diplomat)	1976		Minister for Agriculture, Forestry and Environmental Protection,	Sein Win (Brigadier General)	Hua Guofeng	1978
Tha Tun	1978			Maung Maung Kha	Hua Guofeng	1982
Aung Win	1982			Maung Maung Kha	Zhao Ziyang	1983
Hla Shwe	1983		Beijing Embassy by Lanzin Youth leader Major Hla Shwe (1981–84). Group Captain Tin Mg Myint (1984–87).5	Maung Maung Kha	Zhao Ziyang	1984
Tin Maung Myint	1984			Maung Maung Kha	Zhao Ziyang	1987
Tin Aung Tun	1987		Colonel Tin Aung Tun replaced Colonel Tin Win in 2015 when the latter resigned from his position as minister to compete in the November 8	Maung Maung Kha	Li Peng	1991
Sett (Burmese diplomat)	1993	March 2, 1993		Than Shwe	Li Peng	
Ba Htay Chit	2002			Than Shwe	Zhu Rongji	
Sein Win Aung	2003			Khin Nyunt	Wen Jiabao	
Thein Lwin	2007	August 1, 2007	Earlier in August, Myanmar appointed its ambassador to China, Thein Lwin, to serve concurrently as ambassador to North Korea.: In 1974 he was council in London.	Thein Sein	Wen Jiabao	
Tin Oo	2011	March 15, 2011	吴丁乌大使, In 2007 he was Myanmese Ambassador to Sri Lanka. Colombo	Thein Sein	Wen Jiabao	
Hong Liang	2015		(* septiembre de 1969)	Thein Sein	Li Keqiang	

== See also ==
- China–Myanmar relations
