= Ministry of Planning and Finance (Myanmar) =

Government ministry in Myanmar

- စီမံကိန်းနှင့်ဘဏ္ဍာရေးဝန်ကြီးဌာန

Agency overview
- Formed: 1948; 78 years ago
- Superseding agency: Ministry of National Planning and Economic Development
- Type: Ministry
- Jurisdiction: Government of Burma
- Headquarters: Naypyidaw
- Minister responsible: Win Shein
- Website: www.mopfi.gov.mm

The Ministry of Planning and Finance (Burmese: စီမံကိန်းနှင့်ဘဏ္ဍာရေးဝန်ကြီးဌာန; abbreviated MOPF; formerly the Ministry of Finance) was a ministry that administered Burma's monetary, fiscal policies and national planning. It was split into the Ministry of Finance and Revenue and the Ministry of National Planning, Investment and Foreign Economic Relations.

Ministry of Planning and Finance was led by Win Shein who was appointed by SAC chairman Min Aung Hlaing.

== Ministers responsible for Finance ==
- U Tin Tut, 1946-1947
- U Thakin Mya, June - July 1947
- Thakin Lun Baw, July 1947 - August 1947
- U Tin Tut, August 1947 - November 1947
- U Ko Gyi, November 1947 - March 1948
- U Tin, March 1948 - June 1956
- Bo Khin Maung Gale, June 1956 - June 1958
- U Kyaw Nein, June 1958 - April 1960
- Thakin Tin, April 1960 - March 1962
- General Ne Win March 1962 - December 1963
- Brigadier San Yu, December 1963 - April 1972
- U Lwin, April 1972 - 1977
- U Than Sein, 1977
- U Tun Tin, 1977-1988
- Maung Maung Khin, 1988-1989
- David Oliver Abel, 1989-1992
- Win Tin, 1992-1997
- U Khin Maung Thein, December 1997 - February 2003
- Hla Tun, February 2003 - August 2012
- Win Shein, September 2012 - March 2016
- Kyaw Win, March 2016 - May 2018
- Soe Win, May 2018–1 February 2021
- Win Shein, 1 February 2021 - incumbent

== See also ==
- Cabinet of Burma
