= List of ambassadors of Myanmar to Belgium =

Coordinates: 50.858816°N 4.395262°E

Ambassador of Myanmar to Belgium
- Inaugural holder: Ba Saw
- Formation: May 22, 1973

The Myanmar Ambassador in Brussels is the official representative of the Government in Naypyidaw to the Government of Belgium and concurrently to the European Commission.

== History ==
- Since 1989 Union of Myanmar
- From May 22, 1973 to March 17, 1998 he had his Residence in Bonn as Myanmar Ambassador to Germany.

== List of representatives ==
| Diplomatic agreement/designated/Diplomatic accreditation | Ambassador | Observations | List of presidents of Myanmar | Prime Minister of Belgium | Term end |
|---|---|---|---|---|---|
| May 22, 1973 | Ba Saw | With residence in Bonn as Myanmar Ambassador to Germany.: In 1962 he was Myanmar Ambassador to the Philippines.; In 1964 he was Myanmar Ambassador to Thailand.; On June 1, 1968 he became Myanmar Ambassador to the United Kingdom. | Ne Win | Edmond Leburton | July 23, 1988 |
| January 18, 1977 | Chit Moung | With residence in Bonn as Myanmar Ambassador to Germany.: Deputy Minister of Planning and Finance. | Ne Win | Leo Tindemans | July 23, 1988 |
| July 23, 1979 | Maung Maung Nyunt | With residence in Bonn as Myanmar Ambassador to Germany. | Ne Win | Wilfried Martens | July 23, 1988 |
| November 23, 1982 | Than Lwin | With residence in Bonn as Myanmar Ambassador to Germany. | San Yu | Wilfried Martens | July 28, 1988 |
| February 10, 1987 | Maung Maung Than Tun | With residence in Bonn as Myanmar Ambassador to Germany. | San Yu | Wilfried Martens | July 28, 1988 |
| January 10, 1991 | Win Aung | With residence in Bonn as Myanmar Ambassador to Germany. | Saw Maung | Wilfried Martens | April 24, 1992 |
| March 17, 1998 | Tun Ngwe | With residence in Bonn as Myanmar Ambassador to Germany. | Than Shwe | Jean-Luc Dehaene | March 30, 2011 |
| October 26, 2000 | Linn Myaing | | Than Shwe | Guy Verhofstadt | March 30, 2011 |
| June 6, 2002 | Wunna Maung Lwin | | Than Shwe | Guy Verhofstadt | March 30, 2011 |
| July 22, 2008 | Thaung Tun (Burmese diplomat) | | Than Shwe | Yves Leterme | March 30, 2011 |
| January 28, 2011 | Thant Kyaw | | Thein Sein | Yves Leterme | March 30, 2016 |
| February 20, 2013 | Paw Lwin Sein | | Thein Sein | Elio Di Rupo | March 30, 2016 |
