= Soe Win (minister) =

Burmese politician

U Soe Win
- စိုးဝင်း
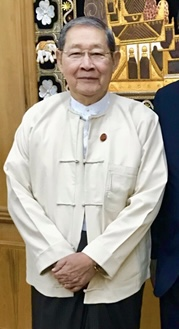
- 2019

Minister for Planning and Finance
- In office 25 May 2018 – 1 February 2021
- President: Win Myint
- Preceded by: Kyaw Win
- Succeeded by: Win Shein

Minister for Industry of Myanmar
- In office 30 July 2019 – 28 Nov 2019
- Preceded by: Khin Maung Cho

Personal details
- Born: 13 December 1938 (age 87) Moulmein, Burma (Myanmar)
- Party: Independent
- Spouse: Ma Ma Swe

U Soe Win (Burmese: စိုးဝင်း [só wɪ́ɴ]; born 13 December 1938) is the former Minister for Planning and Finance of Myanmar (Burma). He is a financial professional and previously served as the managing partner of Deloitte in Myanmar.

== Early life and education ==
Soe Win was born in Moulmein, British Burma (now Mawlamyaing, Myanmar) on 13 December 1938 to parents U Tin and Daw Ngwe Pwint. He possesses BA, LLB and DMA qualifications. He is married to Mar Mar Swe.

== Career ==
Soe Win entered the banking trade in 1961, joining a state-owned commercial bank as Deputy Manager in 1961. He was appointed as the Deputy Controller of Foreign Exchange (Myanmar Foreign Trade Bank) in 1990 and as General Manager in 1993. He serves on the board of Renaissance Institute, a Myanmar-based think tank. He subsequently founded Myanmar Vigour in 2003, which became a member firm of Deloitte in 2015. He specializes in Myanmar taxation, investment laws and banking.

After Kyaw Win's resignation as the incumbent Minister of Planning and Finance during a corruption investigation, Soe Win was nominated by President Win Myint as the successor on 29 May 2018. In the aftermath of the military-led 2021 Myanmar coup d'état, the Myanmar Armed Forces appointed Win Shein as Soe Win's successor on 1 February 2021. Soe Win was placed under house arrest by the Myanmar Armed Forces.
