= List of ambassadors of Myanmar to Germany =

Coordinates: 52.455324°N 13.284930°E

Ambassador of Myanmar to Germany
- Incumbent; Yin Yin Myint since May 19, 2015
- Inaugural holder: Nyun
- Formation: January 1, 1955

The Myanmar Ambassador in Berlin is the official representative of the Government in Naypyidaw to the Government of Germany.

- Since January 30, 1986, she is concurrently as Myanmar Ambassador to the Czech Republic in Pargue coacredited.

== History ==
- Since 1989 Union of Myanmar
- From December 23, 1969 to March 17, 1998 the Burmese Ambassador in Bonn was concurrently Myanmar Ambassador to Austria.
- From May 22, 1973 to March 17, 1998 the Burmese Ambassador in Bonn was concurrently Myanmar Ambassador to Belgium.

== List of representatives ==
Diplomatic agreement/designated/Diplomatic accreditation	Ambassador	Observations	List of presidents of Myanmar	List of chancellors of Germany	Term end
January 1, 1955	So Nyun	(*1886) Life Extending by Fishes The 53-year-old Burmese ambassador So Nyun, who is living as a result of a cancer affliction, recently gave 53 fish their freedom again after a Buddhist rite.: U Khin Maung Gale, Charge d'Affaires in the Legation of the Union of Burma in the Hotel Muskewitz, Dechenstr. 5, Bonn.	Ba U	Konrad Adenauer	1958
January 1, 1958	Sithu Myat Tun		Win Maung	Konrad Adenauer	1962
January 1, 1962	vacant		Ne Win	Konrad Adenauer	1963
July 29, 1966	Maung Lwin		Ne Win	Ludwig Erhard	1971
January 1, 1974	Ba Saw	Tun Kyi First Secretary; Tint So Second Secretary; Win Naing Third Secretary	Ne Win	Helmut Schmidt	
November 15, 1975	Chit Moung		Ne Win	Helmut Schmidt	
January 1, 1977	Maung Maung Nyunt	Mg Mg Nyunt	Ne Win	Helmut Schmidt	
February 23, 1982	Than Lwin		San Yu	Helmut Kohl	
January 30, 1986	Maung Maung Than Tun	20.06.1986 Myanmar Ambassador to Austria Prague Embassy by FO ex- Captain Than Tun (1987–92)	San Yu	Helmut Kohl	
June 6, 1990	Win Aung		Saw Maung	Helmut Kohl	
September 18, 1996	Tun Ngwe	10.06.1998 accreditation as Myanmar Ambassador to Austria	Than Shwe	Helmut Kohl	2001
December 31, 1999	San Thein		Than Shwe	Gerhard Schröder	
April 1, 2000		The Embassy moved from Schumannstraße 112 Bonn to Zimmerstraße 56, 6. Etage Mitte (locality).	Than Shwe	Gerhard Schröder	
October 7, 2002	Nyunt Maung Shein		Than Shwe	Gerhard Schröder	
June 24, 2005	Thu Yin		Than Shwe	Gerhard Schröder	
July 11, 2012	Lay Lay Nwe	Soe Nwe	Thein Sein	Angela Merkel	
January 1, 2015	Aye Ko Ko	Charge d'Affaires	Thein Sein	Angela Merkel	
May 19, 2015	Yin Yin Myint	Till March 4, 2015 she was Myanmar Ambassador to Brunei.	Htin Kyaw	Angela Merkel	
