= Than Swe (diplomat) =

Burmese diplomat (born 1953)

- သန်းဆွေ
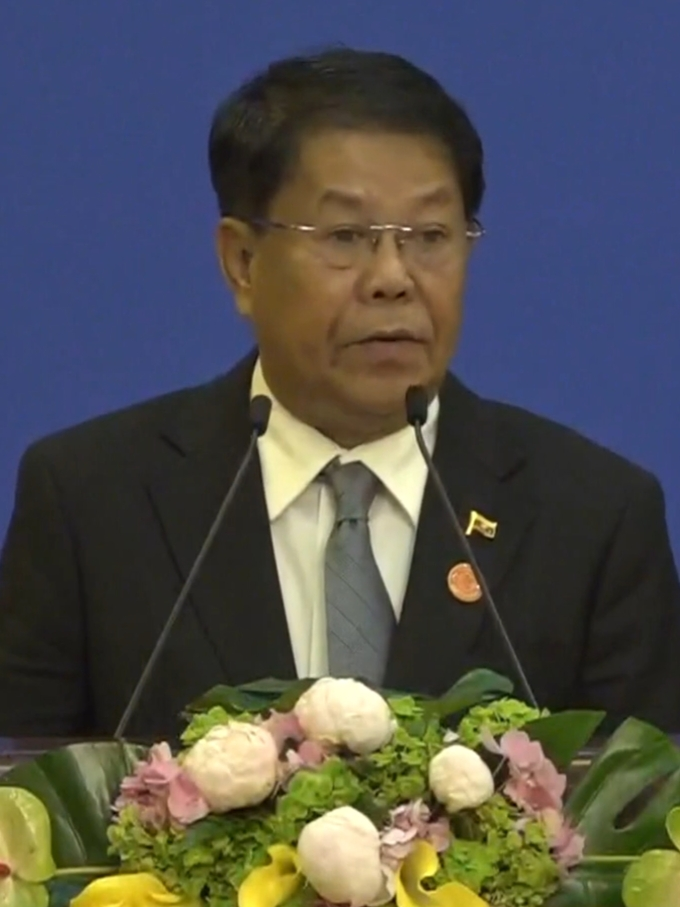
- Than Swe in 2023

Member of the Union Consultative Council
- Incumbent
- Assumed office 10 April 2026
- Appointed by: Min Aung Hlaing
- Leader: Soe Win

Member of the State Security and Peace Commission
- In office 31 July 2025 – 10 April 2026
- Leader: Min Aung Hlaing

Deputy Prime Minister of Myanmar
- In office 3 August 2023 – 31 July 2025 Serving with Soe Win, Mya Tun Oo, Tin Aung San, and Win Shein
- President: Myint Swe (acting)
- Prime Minister: Min Aung Hlaing

Minister for Foreign Affairs
- In office 1 February 2023 – 10 April 2026
- President: Myint Swe (acting)
- Prime Minister: Min Aung Hlaing
- Preceded by: Wunna Maung Lwin
- Succeeded by: Tin Maung Swe

Myanmar Ambassador to the United States
- In office 25 July 2012 – 30 July 2012
- President: Thein Sein
- Preceded by: Lynn Myaing
- Succeeded by: Kyaw Myo Htut

Myanmar's Permanent Representative to the United Nations
- In office 8 April 2009 – 24 July 2012
- Prime Minister: Thein Sein
- Leader: Than Shwe

Personal details
- Born: 19 June 1953 (age 73) Burma
- Children: 2
- Education: Defence Services Academy
- Occupation: Diplomat

Military service
- Allegiance: Myanmar
- Branch/service: Myanmar Army
- Years of service: 1975-2000
- Rank: Colonel

Than Swe (Burmese: သန်းဆွေ) is a Burmese diplomat and retired military officer, as well as a member of the Union Consultative Council. He served as Deputy Prime Minister of Myanmar from 3 August 2023 to 31 July 2025, and as Minister for Foreign Affairs from 1 February 2023 to 10 April 2026.

== Early life and education ==
Than Swe was born on 19 June 1953. He graduated from the 16th intake of the Defence Services Academy, alongside Wunna Maung Lwin, Thein Soe and Nyan Tun.

== Military career ==
Than Swe served in the Burmese Armed Forces from January 1975 to May 2000.

== Post-military career ==
Between May 2000 to March 2009, Than Swe worked in the Ministry of Progress of Border Areas and National Races and Development Affairs. In July 2012, he was appointed as Myanmar's ambassador to the United States, becoming the first to serve since 2004 and signalling the restoration of full diplomatic ties between the two countries (see Myanmar–United States relations). Between 2004 and 2012, the Burmese government had appointed a lower-ranking charge d'affaires to the role.

After the 2021 Myanmar coup d'état, Than Swe was appointed as the head of the Union Civil Service Board until August 2022. During his term, he reinstated policies during the Than Shwe era, including military-style uniforms for civil servants, and requirements to undergo military training and shooting practice for civil servants. He was appointed chair of the Anti-Corruption Commission of Myanmar on 19 August 2022. In November 2022, he was sanctioned by the European Union for his role in legitimising the military coup and involvement in legal proceedings against the deposed leaders.

On 1 February 2023, the State Administration Council, Myanmar's military junta, appointed Than Swe as Minister for Foreign Affairs, replacing Wunna Maung Lwin. On 3 August 2023, he was additionally appointed as a deputy prime minister.

On 10 April 2026, he was appointed member of the Union Consultative Council.

== Personal life ==
Than Swe is married and has two daughters. His son-in-law, Aung Ko, was President Thein Sein's primary interpreter from 2011 to 2016.

== See also ==
- 2021 Myanmar coup d'état
- Tatmadaw
