= Wunna Maung Lwin =

Minister of Foreign Affairs of Myanmar

- ဝဏ္ဏမောင်လွင်
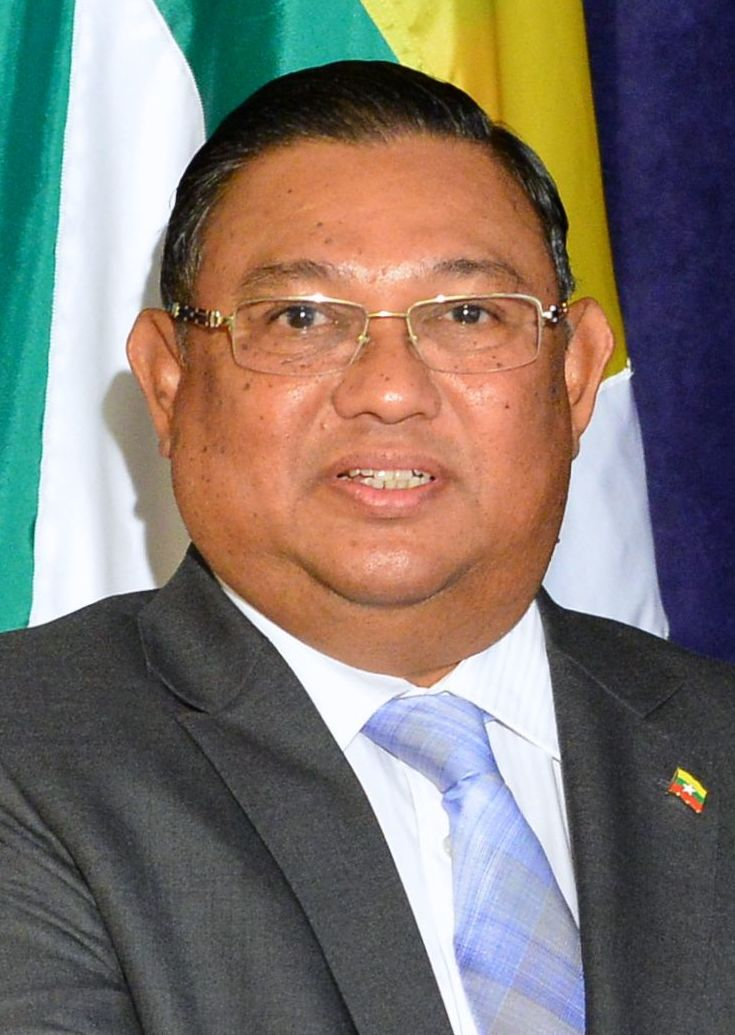
- Wunna Maung Lwin in 2015

Member of the State Administration Council
- In office 1 February 2023 – 31 July 2025

19th and 21st Minister of Foreign Affairs
- In office 1 February 2021 – 1 February 2023
- President: Myint Swe (acting)
- SAC chairman and prime minister: Min Aung Hlaing
- Preceded by: Aung San Suu Kyi
- Succeeded by: Than Swe
- In office 30 March 2011 – 30 March 2016
- President: Thein Sein
- Preceded by: Nyan Win
- Succeeded by: Aung San Suu Kyi

Permanent Representative to the United Nations
- In office 2007 – 30 March 2011
- Leader: Than Shwe
- Succeeded by: Maung Wai

Personal details
- Born: 30 May 1952 (age 74) Thaton, Mon State, Burma
- Party: USDP (2010–2016)
- Spouse: Lin Lin Tin
- Children: Tin Thitsar Lwin; Lin Marlar Lwin; Lin Min Aung Lwin
- Parent: Maung Lwin (father)
- Education: Defence Services Academy; Methodist English High School
- Cabinet: Min Aung Hlaing's military cabinet

Military service
- Allegiance: Myanmar
- Branch/service: Myanmar Army
- Years of service: 1971–1998
- Rank: Colonel

Wunna Maung Lwin (Burmese: ဝဏ္ဏမောင်လွင်; born 30 May 1952,) is a Burmese politician and a member of State Administration Council. He was a Minister of Foreign Affairs under Commander-in-Chief of Defence Services Min Aung Hlaing after the 2021 Myanmar coup d'état. He previously served as the Minister of Foreign Affairs from March 2011 to March 2016. He is a retired colonel in the Myanmar Army.

== Early life and education ==
Wunna Maung Lwin was born in Thaton, Mon State on 30 May 1954. He graduated from the 16th intake of the Defence Services Academy in 1971.

== Career ==
He joined the Myanmar Diplomatic service in 2000, after a long career in the Myanmar Armed Forces from 1971 to 1998. Before he holds the current position, he served as Director-General of the Ministry of Border Affairs (Myanmar) from July 1998 to September 2000, Myanmar Ambassador to Israel from 2000 to 2001, France from 2001 to 2004, Belgium and EU from 2004 to 2007 and Permanent Representative to the United Nations in Geneva, Switzerland from 2007 to 2011.

=== Foreign minister ===
He served as the 19th Foreign Minister of Myanmar from 2011 to 2016. Thein Sein appointed him in his cabinet. Later he became the CEC member of USDP. In the 2020 general election, he lost to his opponent from NLD, Kyaw Htwe.

But after 2021 coup, Min Aung Hlaing appointed him as Foreign Minister. On 24 February, Wunna Maung Lwin met with Thailand Foreign Minister, Don Pramudwinai and Indonesia Foreign Minister, Retno Marsudi in Thailand. He also met with Thailand Prime Minister, Prayut Chan-o-cha. This was the first foreign trip of the military cabinet member.

== Personal life ==
Wunna Maung Lwin is married to Lin Lin Tin, the youngest daughter of Thakhin Ba Tin, a member of the Dobama Asiayone and a cousin of Kyu Kyu Hla. He has three children, Tin Thitsa Lwin, Lin Marlar Lwin, and Lin Min Maung Lwin.

== Personal Sanctions ==
On December 11, 2023, the European Union imposed personal restrictions on Wunna Maung Lwin due to his role as a newly appointed member of the State Administration Council and former junta-appointed Foreign Minister. In these positions, he has tried to legitimize the junta's rule and contributed to ongoing repressions and the commission of serious human rights violations by the junta since the February 2021 coup.

Political offices
Preceded by Nyan Win	Minister of Foreign Affairs; 2011–2016	Succeeded by Aung San Suu Kyi
Political offices
Preceded by Aung San Suu Kyi	Minister of Foreign Affairs; 2021–2023	Succeeded by Than Swe
