= Win (Burmese diplomat) =

Burmese diplomat (1947–1959)

Maha Thray Sithu Win

Myanmar Ambassador to India
- In office 1947–1950
- Succeeded by: U Kyin

Myanmar Ambassador to the United States
- In office December 5, 1955 – August 21, 1959
- Preceded by: James Barrington (Burmese diplomat)
- Succeeded by: Ohn Sein

Myanmar Ambassador to the Headquarters of the United Nations
- In office 1955–1957
- Preceded by: James Barrington (Burmese diplomat)
- Succeeded by: U Thant

Myanmar Ambassador to Canada
- In office October 8, 1958 – October 9, 1959
- Succeeded by: Ohn Sein

Personal details
- Born: 15 February 1905 Yangoon
- Spouse: married to Daw Mya Mya Win
- Children: sons: Khin Maung Win, Tin Maung Win, Bo Bo Win; daughter: Tin Tin Win
- Parent(s): timber merchants of Pugyi, Insein district
- Education: B.A., Bachelor in Education (B.Ed.), Bachelor of Laws Rangoon University
- Awards: December 1955 the Order of the White Elephant, Thailand.; on June 9, 1956 Order of Thado Maha Thray Sithu.; March 1, 1958. Honorary Doctorate Degree at Bucknell University, Lewisburg, Pennsylvania,

Win was a Burmese diplomat, politician and lawyer.

== Life ==
- From 1930 to 1942 he was Senior Master at the Education Department.
- From 1942 to 1944, during Japanese occupation, he was Deputy Director in charge of Labour.
- From 1945 to 1947 he was President, Trade Union Congress (Burma).
- In 1947 he was:
- Leader of the Burma Socialist Party and Member in the Constituent Assembly from the Lanmadaw Township Rangoon.
- Vice-President of the Anti-Fascist People's Freedom League.
- Member of Governor's Executive Council in charge of Industry and Labour,
- High Commissioner for Burma in India.
- From 1948 to 1950 he was Ambassador in New Delhi.
- On September 28, 1948 he was designated Minister for Education and Democratisation of Local Administration.
- On January 3, 1950 he was designated Minister for DLA (Democratisation of Local Administration), Public Health, Rehabilitation and Public Works.
- From September 14, 1950 to 1952 he was Minister for Defence, Home and Religious Affairs.
- On August 30, 1951 he was elected to the Chamber of Deputies from Yamethin South.
- On March 16, 1952 he was designated Minister for National Planning and Religious Affairs.
- On September 5, 1953 he was designated Minister for Union Culture.
- From December 5, 1955 to August 21, 1959 he was ambassador in Washington, D.C. and concurrently till 1957 Permanent Representative next the Headquarters of the United Nations.
- Within the Headquarters of the United Nations he was chairman of the Asian-African Group.
- In August 1958 he was designated and on October 9, 1958 co-accredited as Myanmar Ambassador to Canada.
- In 1959 he became Member of the Executive Committee of the Clean AFPFL.
- In March 1960 he became Treasurer of the Union Party (Burma).
- On March 17, 1961 he resigned with entire Executive Committee of the Clean AFPFL.
