= Kyaw Win =

Burmese politician

U Kyaw Win
- ကျော်ဝင်း
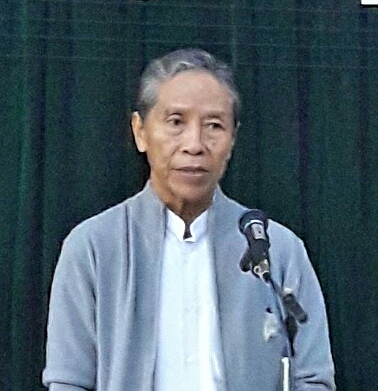

Minister for Planning and Finance
- In office 30 March 2016 – 25 May 2018
- President: Htin Kyaw; Myint Swe (acting); Win Myint
- Preceded by: Kan Zaw (National Planning and Economic Development); Win Shein (Finance)
- Succeeded by: Soe Win

Pyithu Hluttaw MP
- In office 1 February 2016 – 30 March 2016
- Constituency: Dagon Seikkan

Personal details
- Born: February 23, 1948 (age 78) Labutta, Burma (Myanmar)
- Party: National League for Democracy (NLD)
- Spouse: Khin Saw Yu
- Children: 3
- Education: Yangon Institute of Economics

U Kyaw Win (Burmese: ဦးကျော်ဝင်း [tɕɔ̀ wɪ́ɴ]; born 23 February 1948) is a Burmese politician who served as Minister for Planning and Finance of Myanmar from 30 March 2016 to 25 May 2018.

== Early life and education ==
Kyaw Win was born in Labutta, Irrawaddy Division, Burma (now Ayeyarwady Region, Myanmar) to Pwa Gyi and Aye Nyunt on 23 February 1948.

== Career ==
In 2015, Kyaw Win was elected as a member of parliament in the Pyithu Hluttaw for the constituency of Dagon Seikkan.

In 2016, he was nominated as Minister of Planning and Finance in Htin Kyaw's inaugural Cabinet, whereupon his academic credentials came under scrutiny and he was revealed to have listed a bogus PhD on his CV from a fictitious online university, Brooklyn Park University. He resigned from his position in May 2018. The President Office accepted his resignation on 25 May 2018.

== Personal life ==
Kyaw Win is married to Khin Saw Yu, and has three children, Khin Nwe Nwe Win, Thiha Kyaw, and Sithu Kyaw.
