= Deputy Prime Minister of Myanmar =

Deputy head of government of Myanmar

Deputy Prime Minister of Republic of the Union of Myanmar
- ပြည်ထောင်စုသမ္မတ မြန်မာနိုင်ငံတော် ဒုတိယဝန်ကြီးချုပ်
- State Seal of Myanmar
- Style: His Excellency (formal)
- Type: Deputy head of government
- Status: Office abolished
- Member of: Cabinet
- Reports to: Prime Minister
- Seat: Naypyidaw
- Appointer: State Administration Council
- Term length: No fixed term
- Constituting instrument: SAC Order No 152/2021
- Formation: 4 January 1948 (first); 1 August 2021 (second)
- First holder: Bo Let Ya
- Abolished: 30 March 2011 (first); 31 July 2025 (second)

The deputy prime minister of Myanmar was the deputy head of government of Myanmar. The position is not currently used.

== History of the office ==
The position of Prime Minister was created in 1948, with the adoption of the Burmese Declaration of Independence from the United Kingdom. Due to the country's long period of military rule, it has not been uncommon for the prime minister to be a serving (or recently retired) military officer.

The position was abolished according to the current Constitution (adopted in 2008). It provided that the president is both the head of state and head of government.

On 1 August 2021, State Administration Council formed the caretaker government and vice chairman of SAC became Deputy Prime Minister.

On 31 July 2025, the NDSC ended the state of emergency and re-formed the Union Government, with the position of deputy prime minister abolished.

== Deputy prime ministers of Burma/Myanmar (1948–present) ==
(Dates in italics indicate de facto continuation of office)

Portrait	Name (Birth–Death)	Term of office			Political party
Portrait	Name (Birth–Death)	Took office	Left office	Time in office	Political party
=== Union of Burma (1948–1974) ===
	Bo Let Ya ဗိုလ်လက်ျာ (1911–1978)	4 January 1948	14 September 1948	254 days	Military
	Kyaw Nyein ကျော်ငြိမ်း (1913–1986)	14 September 1948	2 April 1949	200 days	Anti-Fascist People's Freedom League
	Ne Win နေဝင်း (1911–2002)	2 April 1949	10 December 1949	252 days	Military
	Sao Hkun Hkio စဝ်ခွန်ချို (1912–1990)	10 December 1949	29 October 1958 (Note: Handed over power to the military.)	8 years, 323 days	Independent
	Ba Swe	1957	1957		Anti-Fascist People's Freedom League
	Kyaw Nyein ကျော်ငြိမ်း (1913–1986)	1958	1958		Anti-Fascist People's Freedom League
	Thein Maung သိမ်းမောင် (1890–1975)	29 October 1958	27 February 1959	121 days	Independent
	Lun Baw လွန်းဘော် (1898–?)	27 February 1959	4 April 1960 (Note: Handed back power to the civilian government after the 1960 general election.)	1 year, 37 days	Independent
	Sao Hkun Hkio စဝ်ခွန်ချို (1912–1990)	4 April 1960	2 March 1962 (deposed.)	1 year, 335 days	Independent
Position abolished (2 March 1962 – 2 March 1974)
=== Socialist Republic of Union of Burma (1974–1988) ===
	U Lwin ဦးလွင် (1924–2011)	2 March 1974	29 March 1977	3 years, 27 days	Burma Socialist Programme Party
	Tun Tin ထွန်းတင် (1920–2020)	29 March 1977	26 July 1988 (resigned.)	11 years, 119 days	Burma Socialist Programme Party
	Thura Kyaw Htin သူရကျော်ထင် (1925–1996)	9 November 1981	18 September 1988 (resigned.)	6 years, 314 days	Military (until 4 November 1985) Burma Socialist Programme Party (from 4 November 1985)
=== Union of Burma /Myanmar (1988–2011) ===
	Than Shwe သန်းရွှေ (born 1933)	21 September 1988	23 April 1992	3 years, 215 days	Military
	Khin Maung Yin ခင်မောင်ရင်	17 July 1995	15 November 1997	2 years, 121 days	Military
	Maung Maung Khin မောင်မောင်ခင်	15 November 1997	25 August 2003	5 years, 283 days	Military
	Tun Tin တင်ထွန်း	15 November 1997	25 August 2003	5 years, 283 days	Military
	Tin Hla တင်လှ (born 1939)	14 November 1998	14 November 2001	3 years, 0 days	Military
Position abolished (25 August 2003 – 30 March 2011)
=== Republic of the Union of Myanmar (2011–present) ===
Position abolished (30 March 2011 – 1 August 2021)
	Soe Win စိုးဝင်း (born 1961)	1 August 2021	31 July 2025	3 years, 364 days	Military
	Mya Tun Oo မြထွန်းဦး (born 1961)	1 February 2023	31 July 2025	2 years, 180 days	Military
	Tin Aung San တင်အောင်စန်း (born 1960)	1 February 2023	31 July 2025	2 years, 180 days	Military
	Soe Htut စိုးထွဋ် (born 1961)	1 February 2023	25 September 2023	236 days	Military
	Win Shein ဝင်းရှိန် (born 1958)	1 February 2023	31 July 2025	2 years, 180 days	Independent
	Than Swe သန်းဆွေ (born 1953)	3 August 2023	31 July 2025	1 year, 362 days	Independent
	Maung Maung Aye မောင်မောင်အေး (born 1962)	18 December 2024	31 July 2025	225 days	Military
Position abolished (31 July 2025 – present)

== See also ==
- Myanmar
  - Politics of Myanmar
  - List of colonial governors of Burma
  - President of Myanmar
  - Prime Minister of Myanmar
  - State Counsellor of Myanmar
  - Vice President of Myanmar
- Lists of office-holders
