= Yin Yin Oo =

Burmese politician

- ယဉ်ယဉ်ဦး

Member of the Advisory Board of Myanmar
- Incumbent
- Assumed office 16 February 2021
- President: Myint Swe
- Prime Minister: Min Aung Hlaing

Deputy director-general of International Organizations and Economic Department
- In office 2011–2016
- President: Thein Sein

Personal details
- Born: Yin Yin Oo Yangon, Myanmar
- Parent(s): Maung Maung; Khin Myint

Yin Yin Oo (Burmese: ယဉ်ယဉ်ဦး) is a Burmese diplomat and a member of the advisory board of the State Administration Council (Myanmar's governing military junta). Referring to her service in the military government of ruler Min Aung Hlaing, The Irrawaddy called her one of "the accomplices of Myanmar's murderer-in-chief". She previously served as the deputy director-general of International Organizations and Economic Department of the Foreign Ministry of Myanmar under President Thein Sein. She retired in 2016 before Aung San Suu Kyi took office. She is the daughter of former president Maung Maung.

On 9 February 2009, leaked diplomatic cables reported on a meeting between US diplomats and Yin Yin Oo, where she advocated for improving Myanmar-United States relations through anti-narcotics cooperation and recovery of US remains from World War II.
