= Aung Shwe =

Burmese politician (1919–2017)

Brigadier General Thray Sithu Aung Shwe
- အောင်ရွှေ
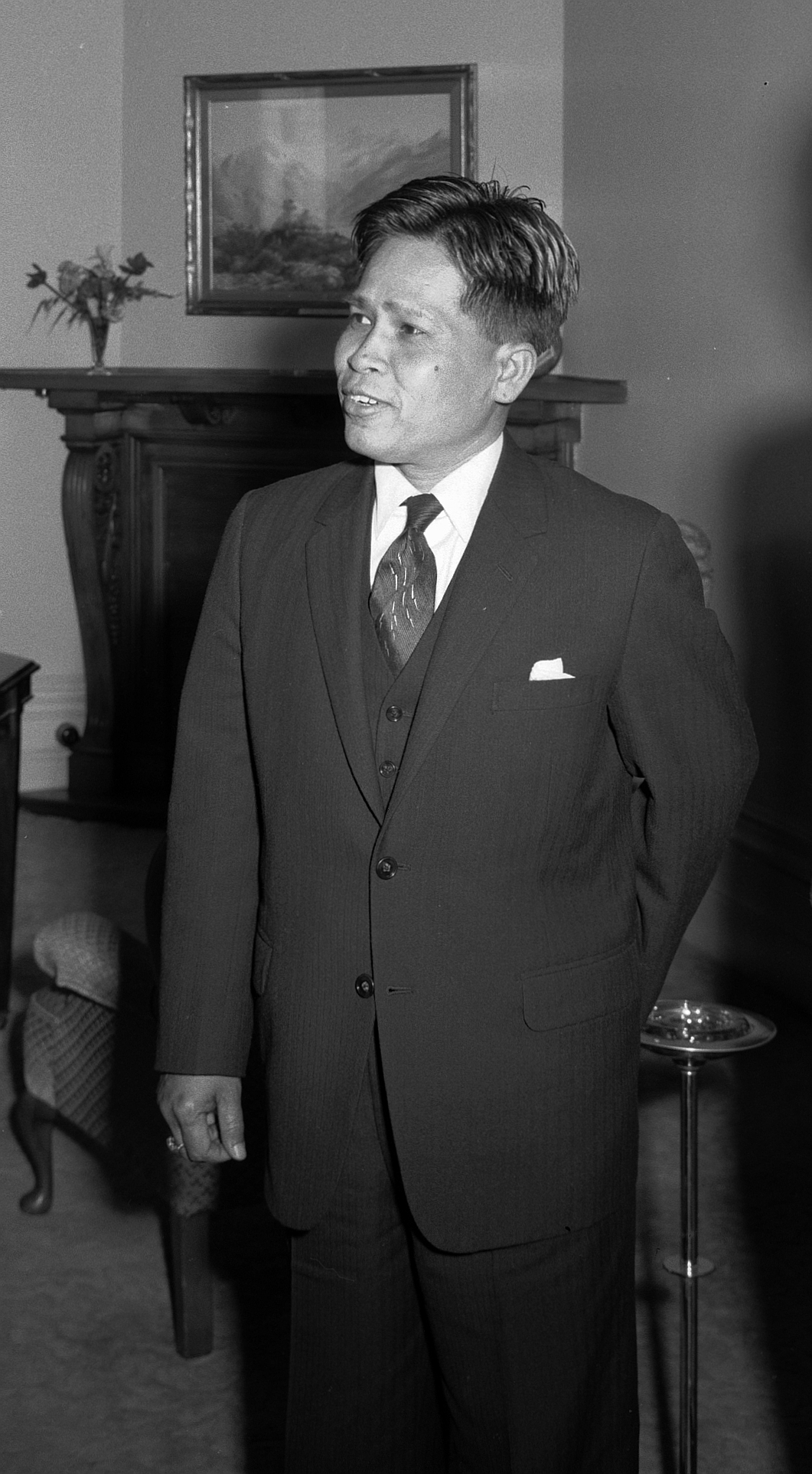

President of the National League for Democracy
- In office 22 December 1990 – 2010
- Leader: Aung San Suu Kyi
- Preceded by: Tin Oo
- Succeeded by: Aung San Suu Kyi

Commander of Southern Command
- In office 1954–1962

Commander of Northern Command
- In office 1957–?

Member-elect of Pyithu Hluttaw (1990)
- Preceded by: Constituency established
- Succeeded by: Constituency abolished
- Constituency: Mayangon Township № 1
- Majority: 66.62%

Personal details
- Born: 19 May 1919 Rangoon, British Burma
- Died: 13 August 2017 (aged 98) Yangon, Myanmar
- Party: Burma Socialist Party (before 1962); Patriotic Old Comrades' League (1988–?); National League for Democracy (1988–2010)
- Spouse: Tin Tin Shwe
- Children: three sons and three daughters
- Parent(s): Phoe Con (father); Thein Tin (mother)

Military service
- Allegiance: Burma
- Branch/service: Myanmar Army
- Years of service: 1946–1962
- Rank: Brigadier General

Brigadier General Aung Shwe (Burmese: အောင်ရွှေ; 19 May 1919 – 13 August 2017) was a Burmese politician and a member of General Ne Win's Burma Rifles rising to Brigadier General. He was one of the founders and former President of the National League for Democracy who took charge of the party when Aung San Suu Kyi and Tin Oo were under house arrest in the early 1990s and 2000s.

== Early life and education ==
Aung Shwe was born in Rangoon, British Burma to Phoe Con and Daw Thein. He graduated in arts from Rangoon University in 1940. From 1942 to 1945, he served under the leadership of General Aung San's Burma Independence Army, Burma Defence Army and Patriotic Burmese Forces during the Japanese occupation of Burma. Aung Shwe joined the Burmese army in 1945.

== Military and governmental career ==
Aung Shwe played a role in the 1958 caretaker government and served as a high-ranking military officer led by General Ne Win. During this time, he also served as the Commander of the Southern Regional Command from 1955 to 1961 and Northern Regional Command in 1957.

Aung Shwe was a member of the Burma Socialist Party before the 1962 Burmese coup d'état. He was forced to retire from Tatmadaw in 1961 after a public disagreement with General Ne Win, on the military's long-term role in government.

He then served as Burmese ambassador to France, Australia, Egypt, Spain and New Zealand from 1961 to 1975. Subsequent to his posting in Australia, He served in Egypt and then in Paris until his retirement from government service in 1975. He settled in Rangoon, where in 1988 public demonstrations erupted that eventually spread across the country. The people of Burma were tired of the authoritarian rule of the Burma Socialist Programme Party.

== Political career ==
Aung Shwe founded National League for Democracy Party with Tin Oo and secretary-general, Aung San Suu Kyi on 27 September 1988. He was a leading member of the NLD and also chairman of the Patriotic Old Comrades' League (POCL) in 1988.

He was elected as the MP for Yangon Region Mayangon Township Constituency No. 1 in the 1990 Myanmar general election. He was also chairman of the Committee Representing the People's Parliament (CRPP), a group of successful candidates in the 1990 elections.

== Personal life and death ==
He died on 13 August 2017 at Victoria Hospital in Yangon, Myanmar. He is survived by his three sons and three daughters namely Aung Than Shwe, Than Pe Shwe, Aung Myint Shwe, Yuzana Shwe, Myinzu Shwe and Sabai Shwe.
