= Sein Win (general, born 1919) =

- စိန်ဝင်း
- Sein Win c. 1970s

Prime Minister of Burma
- In office 4 March 1974 – 29 March 1977
- President: Ne Win
- Preceded by: Ne Win
- Succeeded by: Maung Maung Kha

Personal details
- Born: 19 March 1919 Moulmein, British Raj
- Died: 29 June 1993 (aged 74) Yangon, Myanmar
- Party: Burma Socialist Programme Party
- Spouse: Mya Shwe
- Education: Police Officer Training School, Mandalay
- Awards: Independence Mawgunwin (First Class); Thiri Pyanchi

Military service
- Allegiance: Myanmar
- Branch/service: Myanmar Army
- Years of service: 1942–1972
- Rank: Brigadier General

Brigadier General Sein Win (Burmese: စိန်ဝင်း, pronounced [sèiɰ̃ wɪ́ɰ̃]; 19 March 1919 – 29 June 1993) was a Burmese military officer who fought along with the legendary Thirty Comrades in the struggle for independence from Britain. He later held various positions in the government of Burma from 1962 to 1977 and served as Prime Minister of Burma (now Myanmar).

== Early life ==
Sein Win was born in Danyingon, Moulmein (now Mawlamyine), then under British Raj Burma on 19 March 1919 as the son of Thin Myaing and Pwe Kyu. He was educated in Pyon Yin School, National Middle School, and Government High School in Tavoy (now Dawei).

== Student activist ==
In 1938, he moved back from Tavoy to Moulmein to study at Shin Maha Buddhaghosa National School (now BEHS 9 Mawlamyine). The Great General Strike of 1938, known as Htaung thoun ya byei Ayeidawbon (the "Revolution of 1300" named after the Burmese calendar year), saw him as one of the district committee members of student protesters at Kyaikthanan picketing the colonial government. In that year, he passed matriculation exam from Shin Maha Buddhaghosa National School and in 1940 he attended Police Officer Training in Mandalay.

== Freedom fighter ==
After successful completion of police officer training, he worked as a cadet police officer for some time. In early 1942, he joined the Burma Independence Army (BIA) when the fifth unit of BIA led by Bo Let Ya entered Burma from Thai-Burma border. In March 1945, right before Japanese revolution, he was promoted to the rank of major by General Aung San. Under General Aung San's command, he participated in Burma campaign 1944–45.

== Army career ==
He then worked in the army up to the post of the commander at the Southeastern Military Command with the rank of Brigadier General. In 1962, after Ne Win's military coup, he became a member of the Revolutionary Council of Burma through which Ne Win ruled Burma.

== Prime minister ==
In 1964, he became Minister for Construction and Public Work in Ne Win's administration. In 1971, he also chaired the Burma Socialist Programme Party's Party Inspection Committee. On 20 April 1972, Sein Win retired from army. In 1974, he became Prime Minister of the Socialist Republic of the Union of Burma. In 1977, he was blamed for the economic problems of the country and dismissed from office by President Ne Win. He then became a State Councillor of Burma, a position from which he retired in 1985.

== Family ==
In 1943, he married Mya Shwe, daughter of Captain Ba Pe and Daw Mone. The couple had seven children, one of whom died in infancy.

== See also ==
Political offices
Preceded by Ne Win	Prime Minister of Burma; 1974–1977	Succeeded by Maung Maung Kha
