= List of ambassadors of Myanmar to France =

Coordinates: 48.877275°N 2.307134°E

Ambassador of Myanmar to France Ambassade de Birmanie en France
- ပြင်သစ်နိုင်ငံဆိုင်ရာမြန်မာ သံအမတ်ကြီး
- Incumbent; Han Thu since February 20, 2014
- Inaugural holder: Mya Sein
- Formation: January 1, 1948

The Myanmar Ambassador in Paris is the official representative of the Government in Naypyidaw to the Government of France and concurrently to the UNESCO, the governments in Madrid and Lisbon.

== History ==
- Since 1989 Union of Myanmar

== List of representatives ==
Diplomatic agreement/designated/Diplomatic accreditation	Ambassador	Observations	List of presidents of Myanmar	List of presidents of France	Term end
January 1, 1948	Mya Sein (Burmese diplomat)	Mya Sein started out as the first envoy to France in 1948.: Mya Sein joined the Burmese Foreign Service in 1947 and held the position of Minister of Burma to France from 1948 to 1951. He subsequently became Counsellor/Chargé d'affaires at the Burmese Embassy at Djakarta and in 1959 was appointed Minister/Chargé d' Affaires at the Burmese Embassy at Kuala Lumpur. He became Ambassador at this post in 1962.; In 1963 he became Myanmar Ambassador to New Zealand	Sao Shwe Thaik	Vincent Auriol	January 1, 1951
December 1, 1951	Zaw Win (Burmese diplomat)	formerly Chargé d'affaires, Myanmar Ambassador to Indonesia, Jakarta.	Sao Shwe Thaik	Vincent Auriol	
December 30, 1954	Soe Tint	Chargé d'affaires 60, Rue Ampere, Paris 17, e. FRANCE. The Legation of the Union of Burma in France, 60, Rue Ampere, Paris 17, e. Cables : UNIBURMA, PARIS.: Chargé d'Affaires ... ... ... U Soe Tint.; Second Secretary ... ... ... U Kyaw.; Third Secretary ... ... ... Saw Charles Pru	Ba U	René Coty	January 1, 1956
August 1, 1958	Wunna Kyaw Htin Sao Boonwaat	(* March 31, 1919): 1940 Bachelor of Science Economy University of Yangon.; In 1940 entered the Shan State Civil Service.; 1941-46 from civil servant to Ass't in Burma Army HQ.; 1946-47 Political Sec'y to Min. for Frontier Areas.; In 1947 joined the Burma Foreign Service.; 1953-57 Counselor Chargé d'affaires, Myanmar Ambassador to the United Kingdom, London.; 1957-58 Counselor Chargé d'affaires Myanmar Ambassador to Indonesia, Jakarta.; In August 1958 he became Minister to France.; Burmese Ambassador to France and Permanent Delegate of the Union of Burma to Unesco.; He was a very good violinist and adept in classical music both Western and Eastern (Burmese, Shan, Laos, Indonesian).	Win Maung	René Coty	
December 18, 1964	El Zahre Lian	Reportage n° 1736 / Remise des lettres de créance par U. El Zahre Lian, ambassadeur de Birmanie en France. 18 décembre 1964: In 1961 he was Minister for Public Works, Housing and Rehabilitation.	Ne Win	Charles de Gaulle	
June 25, 1970	Aung Shwe	From 1961-75 U Aung Shwe served as Ambassador to Australia, Egypt, France, Spain and New Zealand. Subsequent to his posting in Australia, U Aung Shwe served in Egypt and then in Paris until his retirement from government service in 1975. He settled in Rangoon, where in 1988 public demonstrations erupted that eventually spread across the country. The people of Burma were tired of the authoritarian rule of the Burma Socialist Programme Party (BSPP).; In May 1990 he was acting chairman of the National League for Democracy,	Ne Win	Georges Pompidou	
September 15, 1978	Saw Hlaing	(* 1929 at Thaton, Burma), he participated in the Burmese independence movement.: From September 10, 1981 until his assignment to New York, U Saw Hlaing was his country's Permanent Representative to the United Nations Office at Geneva.; From 1978 to 1979, he served concurrently as Burma's Ambassador to France, Spain and Portugal.; In 1984 he was Deputy Minister of Foreign Affairs.	Ne Win	Valéry Giscard d’Estaing	January 1, 1979
November 10, 1980	Maung Maung (Burmese diplomat)		Ne Win	Valéry Giscard d’Estaing	
January 1, 1981	Ko Ko Gyi (Burmese military officer)	ex-Major	San Yu	François Mitterrand	January 1, 1983
January 1, 1983	Khin Mg Win	Dr.	San Yu	François Mitterrand	January 1, 1986
January 1, 1990	Saw Tun	Lt. Commander	Saw Maung	François Mitterrand	
December 7, 1994	Nyunt Tin	Wing Commander	Than Shwe	François Mitterrand	
January 24, 2000	Linn Myaing		Than Shwe	Jacques Chirac	
October 22, 2001	Wunna Maung Lwin		Than Shwe	Jacques Chirac	
September 30, 2005	Saw Hla Min		Than Shwe	Jacques Chirac	
June 6, 2011	Kyaw Zwar Minn		Thein Sein	Nicolas Sarkozy	
February 20, 2014	Han Thu	September 22, 2016 accredited in Madrid.	Thein Sein	François Hollande	

== See also ==
- France–Myanmar relations
