= Win Shein =

Burmese politician (born 1958)

- ဝင်းရှိန်

Minister for Finance and Revenue
- Incumbent
- Assumed office 1 February 2021
- President: Myint Swe (acting)
- Prime Minister: Min Aung Hlaing
- Preceded by: Soe Win
- In office 7 September 2012 – 30 March 2016
- President: Thein Sein
- Preceded by: Hla Tun
- Succeeded by: Kyaw Win

Deputy Prime Minister of Myanmar
- In office 1 February 2023 – 31 July 2025 Serving with Soe Win, Tin Aung San, Mya Tun Oo, and Than Swe
- President: Myint Swe (acting)
- Prime Minister: Min Aung Hlaing

Deputy Minister for Finance and Revenue
- In office July 2012 – September 2012
- President: Thein Sein

Deputy Minister for Transportation
- In office March 2011 – July 2012
- President: Thein Sein

Personal details
- Born: 1 August 1958 (age 68) Mandalay, Burma
- Cabinet: Min Aung Hlaing's military cabinet

Military service
- Allegiance: Myanmar
- Branch/service: Myanmar Navy
- Years of service: 2010
- Rank: Commodore

Win Shein (Burmese: ဝင်းရှိန်; born 1 August 1958 in Mandalay) is a former Myanmar Navy officer and the Deputy Prime Minister of Myanmar. Before his tenure as Deputy Prime Minister, he served in various ministerial roles such as the Deputy Minister for Transportation and Deputy Minister for Finance and Revenue.

== Career ==
From May 2013 to May 2014, he also served as Chairman of the Myanmar Investment Commission (MIC). Win Shein previously served as a Deputy Minister of Transportation from March 2011 to July 2012. He was Deputy Minister for Finance and Revenue from July to September 2012. He was a Myanmar Ambassador to Cambodia and was also nominated as Ambassador to France just before he was appointed as Deputy Minister. In the aftermath of the military-led 2021 Myanmar coup d'état, the Myanmar Armed Forces appointed Win Shein as the Minister for Finance effective 1 February 2021.

He also served as a Commodore, as part of the Myanmar Navy's Naval Training Headquarters.

== Personal life ==
Win Shein's father, San Shein, was formerly a member of the Burma Socialist Programme Party's central executive committee.
