= Thet Tun =

Burmese writer and historian

Wunna Kyawhtin Thet Tun
- Born: August 6, 1926; Yangon, Myanmar
- Died: July 4, 2012 (aged 85)
- Education: B.A (University of Rangoon) and B.Sc (University of London)
- Occupations: Ambassador; writer; historian
- Known for: Ambassador
- Awards: Wanna Kyaw Htin

Wunna Kyawhtin Thet Tun (6 August 1926 – 4 July 2012) was a Burmese ambassador, writer and historian.

== Early life and education ==
He was born in Yangon, Myanmar on 6 August 1926. His father is Phoe Thaung and his mother is Sein Toke.

He attended at Basic Education High School No. 2 Dagon. He graduated from Yangon University and also received a Bachelor of Science degree from the University of London.

== Published books ==
- In the Footsteps of Kinwun (ကင်းဝန်ခြေရာ လိုက်၍သာ) -1998 (won Myanmar National Literature Award)
- Bilingual Essays (သံတို့ အမြင်)-1999
- Contemporary Myanmar & Selected Writings (မျက်မှောက်ခေတ် မြန်မာနှင့် အခြား အင်္ဂလိပ်−မြန်မာ နှစ်ဘာသာဆောင်းပါးများ)-2002
- Experiences Abroad (နိုင်ငံရပ်ခြား အတွေ့အကြုံများ)
- The Writings of General Aung San
- Portraits and Vignettes of Myanmar Personalities (သူတို့အကြောင်း တစေ့တစောင်း)
- A Myanmar Looks at Others (မြန်မာတစ်ဦး၏ ကမ္ဘာ့အမြင်)
- Myanmar Politics 1958-1962
- Selected Writings of Retired Ambassador U Thet Htun

== Personal life ==
He married Khin Khin Ohn. They have two children.
