= James Barrington (cricketer) =

English cricketer (born 1960)

Personal information
- Full name: William Edward James Barrington
- Born: 4 January 1960; Carshalton, Surrey
- Died: 4 August 2025 (aged 65)
- Batting: Right-handed

Domestic team information
- Years: Team
- 1982: Cambridge University
- Source: Cricinfo, 8 April 2017

William Edward James Barrington (4 January 1960 – 4 August 2025) was an English cricketer. He played four first-class matches for Cambridge University Cricket Club in 1982.

Barrington died on 4 August 2025 at the age of 65.

== See also ==
- List of Cambridge University Cricket Club players
