= Tin Latt (diplomat) =

Burmese physician and diplomat (born 1949)

U Tin Latt
- Burmese: ဦးတင်လတ်

Myanmar Ambassador to Nepal
- In office August 6, 1998 – 2000
- Preceded by: Khin Maung Ohn
- Succeeded by: Myint Swe

Myanmar Ambassador to India
- In office April 12, 1999 – 2002
- Preceded by: Wynn Lwin
- Succeeded by: Kyi Thein

Myanmar Ambassador to South Africa
- In office 2002–2002
- Preceded by: June 27, 1996 FO Lt. Commander Hla Myint Oo
- Succeeded by: Tin Oo Lwin; Myint Naung

Myanmar Ambassador to Vietnam
- In office 2000–2006
- Succeeded by: Aye Kywe

Myanmar Ambassador to Malaysia
- In office 2006 – June 7, 2013
- Preceded by: Myint Aung
- Succeeded by: Zaw Myint; U Sein Oo

Personal details
- Born: 8 January 1949 Mawlamyaing
- Spouse(s): Khin Swe Win, Alk Tee (a) Thi Thi Win
- Parents: Sein Tin (father); Saw Han (mother)
- Education: 1966 matriculated St. Patrick's High School. (Basic Education High School No. 5 Botataung).
- Alma mater: 1973 University of Medicine 2, Yangon, M.B., B.S..; 1983 Master of Medicine (Internal Medicine), Institute of Medicine, Mandalay.; 1994 Royal College of Physicians of Edinburgh, Member of Royal College of Paediatrics; 2000 Fellowship of the Royal College of Physicians of London at the Royal College of Physicians of Edinburgh.
- Occupation: From 1976 to 1981 he was Civil Assistant Surgeon, Anti-Venereal Disease Campaign, Meikhtilda.; From 1981 to 1986 he was Civil Assistant Surgeon, Mandalay General Hospital.; From 1986 to 1989 he was Clinincal Demonstrator, Department of Medicine, Institute of Medicine Mandalay,; From 1993 to 1995 he had a study leave as a Member of Royal College of Paediatrics at the Royal College of Physicians of Edinburgh for.; From 1995 to 1996 he was Assistant Lecturer, Department of Medicine, Institute of Medicine 1, Yangon.; From 1996 to 1997 he was Consultant Physician, Falam District Hospital.; In 1997 he was Lecturer and Consultant Physician, Department of Medicine, Institute of Medicine 1, Yangon

Tin Latt is a retired Burmese physician and diplomat.

== Life ==
- On March 23, 1997 he was appointed ambassador in Katmandu, where he was accredited form August 6, 1998 to 2000.
- From 2000 to 2002 he was ambassador in New Delhi.
- In 2002 he was ambassador in Pretoria.
- From 2002 to 2006 he was ambassador in Hanoi.
- From 2008 to June 7, 2013 ambassador in Kuala Lumpur.
