= Bo Let Ya =

Burmese army general (1911–1978)

Brigadier General Bo Let Ya
- ဗိုလ်လက်ျာ
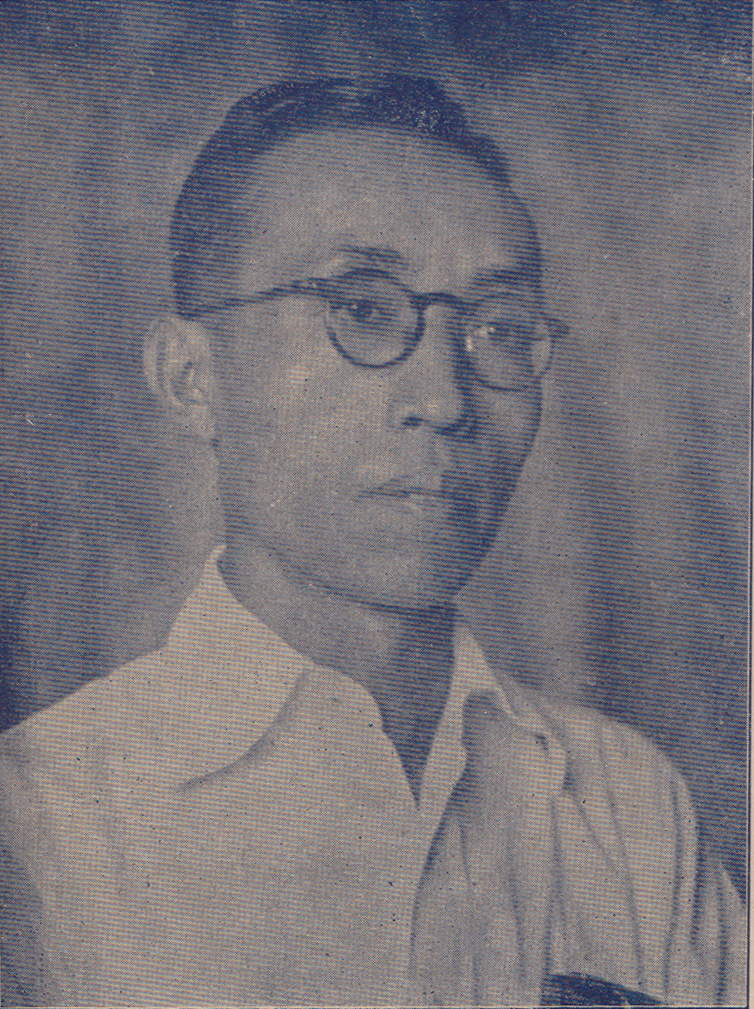

Minister of Defence of Burma
- In office 1 August 1947 – 13 September 1948
- Prime Minister: Aung San (as Deputy Chairman of the Executive Council); U Nu
- Preceded by: Aung San (as Counsellor for Defence)
- Succeeded by: U Nu

Deputy Commander-in-Chief of the Patriotic Burmese Forces
- In office 27 March 1945 – 29 December 1945
- Leader: Aung San
- Succeeded by: Smith Dun (as Deputy General Officer Commanding, Burma Army)

Personal details
- Born: Hla Pe; 30 August 1911 Pyinmana, British Burma (present-day Myanmar)
- Died: 29 November 1978 (aged 67) Prachuap Khiri Khan, Thailand
- Party: Dobama Asiayone; AFPFL; Communist Party of Burma; Parliamentary Democracy Party
- Occupation: Army officer, Statesman
- Awards: Independence Mawgunwin (First Class)

Military service
- Allegiance: Myanmar
- Branch/service: BIA, BDA, BNA, PBF, Tatmadaw
- Years of service: 1942–1961
- Rank: Brigadier general

Bo Let Ya (Burmese: ဗိုလ်လက်ျာ; pronounced [bò lɛʔ jà]; born Hla Pe Burmese: လှဘေ; pronounced [hla̰ pɛ̀]; 30 August 1911 – 29 November 1978) was a Burmese army general and a member of the legendary Thirty Comrades who fought for Burma's independence from Britain. He also served as the first Defence Minister and the first Deputy Prime Minister of the post-independence Union of Burma.

== Early life ==
He attended Myoma High School in Rangoon.

== Career ==
During the Second World War he was Chief of Staff of the Burma Defence Army (1942-1943) and as Deputy Minister of War in the Japanese puppet-state, the State of Burma (1943-1945). After the war, he replaced General Aung San as Deputy Prime Minister and Defence Minister when the latter was assassinated on 19 July 1947. He was later made to resign from the post by AFPFL Government. He was involved in the 1947 Let Ya-Freeman Agreement. He also founded the Patriotic Burmese Army in 1969, an exile rebel army based in Thailand. During the 1950s and 1960s, following his resignation from his political and military posts, he founded Martaban Fisheries and became a millionaire businessman.

Throughout his career, he served the following posts:

- Deputy Minister of War Affairs (1943–1945)
- Defence Councillor (July 1947 – 1948)
- Deputy Prime Minister (January 1948 – 1952)
- Minister of Defence

Following the 1962 coup d'état, Bo Let Ya was imprisoned by the Union Revolutionary Council from 1963 to 1965.

== Death ==
On 29 November 1978, he was killed by Karen troops during a battle following a split in the Karen National Union's leadership.
