= James Barrington (diplomat) =

Maha Thray Sithu James Barrington

Myanmar Ambassador to the United States
- In office October 11, 1950 – December 5, 1955
- Preceded by: So Nyun
- Succeeded by: Win (Burmese diplomat)

Myanmar Ambassador to the Headquarters of the United Nations
- In office 1950–1955
- Succeeded by: U Thant

Myanmar Ambassador to Canada
- In office February 11, 1963 – January 16, 1970
- Preceded by: Ohn Sein
- Succeeded by: Thakin Chan Tun

Personal details
- Born: 4 August 1911 Moulmein
- Died: 31 March 1992 (aged 80) Edmonton, Alberta
- Education: 1933 matriculated from Government English High School, Maymyo,
- Alma mater: 1936 B.A. (Hons) University of Rangoon.; 1936-38 Oxford University.

James Barrington was a Burmese diplomat.

== Life ==
- In September 1936 appointed to the Indian Civil Service (British India).
- Up to 1942 he served as administrative officer in the district.
- On independence of Burma he was appointed Permanent Secretary of the Foreign Office (Myanmar).
- From 1950 to 1955 he was ambassador in Washington, D.C. and concurrently Permanent Representative next the Headquarters of the United Nations.
- In April 1956 he was reappointed Permanent Secretary, Foreign Office (Myanmar).
- In May 1961 he became member of the delegation, Geneva Conference on Laos.
- From February 11, 1963 to January 16, 1970 he was Ambassador in Ottawa.
