= Tin Latt (minister) =

Burmese minister

- တင်လတ်

Deputy Minister for Hotels and Tourism
- In office 21 October 2019 – 1 February 2021
- President: Win Myint
- Preceded by: Htay Aung

Tin Latt (Burmese: တင်လတ်) is the Burmese politician and former Deputy Minister for Hotels and Tourism of Myanmar (Burma). On 21 October 2019, he was nominated to be Deputy Minister for Hotels and Tourism in President Win Myint's Cabinet.

== Career ==
Tin Latt opened Chindwin College for teaching engineering courses practically in Mandalay, Myanmar back in 2007 and served as its President.

He concurrently holds the position of Vice President for the Mandalay Chapter of Myanmar Engineering Societies as well.

Prior to that, Tin Latt was appointed as the general-secretary for Myanmar Engineering Societies and held the role from 2011 to 2018.
