= Maung Maung Kha =

- မောင်မောင်ခ
- Maung Maung Kha c. 1970s

Prime Minister of Burma
- In office 29 March 1977 – 26 July 1988
- President: Ne Win; San Yu
- Preceded by: Sein Win
- Succeeded by: Tun Tin

Personal details
- Born: 7 June 1920 Rangoon, British Burma
- Died: 30 April 1995 (aged 74) Yangon, Myanmar
- Party: Burma Socialist Programme Party
- Spouse: Khin Khin Lay
- Children: Myo Nyunt; Lwin Lwin Myint; Lwan Moe; Nu Nu Yi; Po Po Khin Oo
- Education: University of Rangoon

Military service
- Allegiance: Burma
- Branch/service: Myanmar Army
- Years of service: 1941–1948
- Rank: Colonel

Maung Maung Kha (Burmese: မောင်မောင်ခ [màʊɰ̃ màʊɰ̃ kʰa̰]; 7 June 1920 – 30 April 1995) was Prime Minister of Burma between 1977 and 1988.

Maung Maung Kha was born to Khin Tint and Chit Pe in Yangon. He enrolled in University of Rangoon in 1937 to study engineering but left school in the final year of studies to join the Burma Independence Army (BIA) in 1941. He completed military training, and became a member of the Burmese armed forces during the Japanese occupation of Burma (1942–1945). After independence in 1948, he rose to the rank of colonel and served as the Director of Defence Industries of Burmese Armed Forces.

Colonel Maung Maung Kha became a cabinet member in Gen. Ne Win's military government in 1972 when he was appointed Minister of Industry. Following the establishment of the Socialist Republic of the Union of Burma on 4 January 1974, and adoption of a new Constitution, Maung Maung Kha continued to serve as Minister of Industry and later on as Minister of Mines. On 29 March 1977, he was appointed as the 8th Prime Minister of Myanmar. After increasing unrest in the country, on 26 July 1988, Maung Maung Kha was replaced by Tun Tin as Prime Minister.

Political offices
Preceded by Sein Win	Prime Minister of Burma; 1977–1988	Succeeded by Tun Tin
