= Maung Maung =

President of Union of Myanmar (1925–1994)

Dr. Maung Maung
- မောင်မောင်

7th President of Burma
- In office 19 August 1988 – 18 September 1988
- Vice President: Aye Ko
- Preceded by: Aye Ko as Acting President
- Succeeded by: Saw Maung as Chairman of the State Law and Order Restoration Council

Chairman of the Burma Socialist Programme Party
- In office 19 August 1988 – 18 September 1988
- Preceded by: Sein Lwin
- Succeeded by: Office abolished

Personal details
- Born: 31 January 1925 Mandalay, Burma Province
- Died: 2 July 1994 (aged 69) Yangon, Myanmar
- Party: Burma Socialist Programme Party
- Spouse: Khin Myint
- Relations: U Sint (father); Daw Aye Tin (mother)
- Children: 7, including Yin Yin Oo
- Education: Yale University (JSD, 1962); Utrecht University (LLD, 1956); University of London (LLB, 1953); Rangoon University (BA, 1946)
- Occupation: Historian, journalist, lawyer, politician, professor, writer

Maung Maung (Burmese: မောင်မောင် [màʊɰ̃ màʊɰ̃]; 31 January 1925 – 2 July 1994), known honorifically as Dr. Maung Maung, was a well-known writer and legal scholar in Myanmar, who served as the seventh president of Burma from 19 August 1988 to 18 September 1988.

== Early life and career ==
Maung Maung was born on 31 January 1925 in Mandalay, British Burma. He was the only son amongst seven children of lawyer U Sint and his wife Daw Aye Tin. He completed his comprehensive education at the Buddhist Thathana (BTN) Anglo-Vernacular School at the age of 14. He applied for admission to study a two-year programme in science at Mandalay Intermediate College, which he eventually completed in 1943. During this time, he joined the British Army Auxiliary Corps and attended the fourth intake of Officer Training School (OTS). In 1943, he voluntarily joined the Burma Defence Army (BDA) as a private and later joined the Resistance Movement against the Japanese in 1945. At this point, Maung began his journalistic career as an English-language correspondent for the Rangoon Review. As a young man, his love of camping and outdoor activities once led him to join the Union of Burma Boy Scouts and he eventually rose to the rank of King's Scout.

In 1946, he received a Bachelor of Arts (BA) in English from Rangoon University. Due to staff shortages, he became a lecturer in the history and English departments at Rangoon University and a resident advisor at one of the university hostels. Shortly afterwards, he was appointed to be an editor for the New Times of Burma, a daily English-language newspaper produced by the Ministry of Information. During his time at the Information Ministry, he was notably tasked with translating the first draft of the Burmese Declaration of Independence into English. A year later, he worked as an assistant secretary at Burma Railways.

In 1950, he received a state scholarship to study in the UK. He enrolled in the University of London's external law degree programme, which earned him a Bachelor of Laws (LLB) in 1953. While in London, he also enrolled in legal studies at the Lincoln's Inn, which led to him being called to the British bar and pursued a six-month training programme in journalism and broadcasting at the BBC. In addition, he received a three-month scholarship to study international law at The Hague Academy of International Law in the Netherlands and began his first doctorate under the supervision of Professor J.H.W. Verzijl.

Upon his return to Rangoon in 1953, he worked as a Law Officer in the Attorney-General's office. Concurrently, he founded The Guardian, an English-language monthly magazine in Burma, which was later published as a daily English-language newspaper in 1955 to rival other newspapers like The Nation and The Rangoon Times. This earned him recognition abroad and Maung was invited to attend and contribute to international seminars and conferences in Australia, Cambodia, Malaya, Pakistan, Singapore, South Vietnam and West Germany. In June 1956, he returned to the Netherlands to receive his Doctor of Laws (LLD) from Utrecht University.

In 1960, Maung and his family temporarily relocated to the United States, where he was a Visiting Lecturer in Political Science and Southeast Asian Studies at Yale University. During his stay at Yale, he earned a Doctor of Juridical Science (JSD), on 11 June 1962. Despite offers of employment from his American friends and UN Secretary-General U Thant, he decided to return to Burma with his family in July 1962, shortly after Ne Win's military coup in March.

== Political office ==
Maung Maung served as the Deputy Attorney-General and was part of the Burma delegation to the 14th session of the United Nations General Assembly in General Ne Win's caretaker government from 1958 to 1960. Again serving in Ne Win's military junta, Maung Maung became Chief Justice and, although a civilian, was a prominent member of the central committee of the Burma Socialist Programme Party (BSPP). He played a large part in shaping the 1974 constitution and subsequent changes to the judicial system. On 19 August 1988, amidst a series of large-scale demonstrations, the People's Assembly declared Maung Maung President of Burma and Chairman of BSPP. Anti-government demonstrations continued and widespread disruptions resulted in another military coup led by General Saw Maung on 18 September 1988. After his thirty days as president, Maung Maung disappeared from public life, although it was rumoured that he helped draft the election law governing the 1990 general election.

== Publications ==
Among Maung's well-known publications are:

1. London Diary (1958)
2. The Forgotten Army (1946)
3. Burma in the Family of Nations (1956)
4. General Ne Win and Myanmar Politics (1969 — Won the National Literary Award in Politics)
5. Thet-shi-yar-za-win (1956 — Living History—Books on Biography of Statesmen)
6. To a soldier son (1972)
7. The 1988 Uprising in Burma

== Family ==
Maung died of a heart attack in Yangon, Myanmar on 2 July 1994, aged 69.

He had seven children with his wife, Daw Khin Myint. One of his three sons, the retired Brigadier General U Kyaw Thu, held the post of Deputy Minister of Foreign Affairs on the State Peace and Development Council (SPDC), from 2004 to 2009 and served as chairman of the Tripartite Core Group (TCG) from 2008 to 2010 and chairman of the Union Civil Service Board from 2009 to 2016. He had also served as Myanmar's Ambassador to South Africa from 1999 to 2001 and Myanmar's Ambassador to India from 2001 to 2003. He was bestowed the Thiri Pyan-chi title (outstanding work) by the Government of Myanmar in 2012.

One of his four daughters, Daw Yin Yin Oo became a member of the advisory board of State Administration Council (Myanmar's governing military junta) after the 2021 Myanmar coup d'état. She previously served as the deputy director-general of the International Organisations and Economic Department of the Ministry of Foreign Affairs under President Thein Sein's administration from 2011 to 2016. She accepted on behalf of her father Maung as one of many recipients of posthumous titles awarded by Commander-in-Chief Min Aung Hlaing in 2023.

Political offices
Preceded by Sein Lwin	Chairman of the Council of State and President of Burma; 19 August 1988 – 17 September 1990	Succeeded by Saw Maung; Chairman of the State Law and Order Restoration Council
Party political offices
Preceded by Sein Lwin	Chairman of the Burma Socialist Programme Party; 19 August 1988 – 17 September 1990	Succeeded by Office abolished
