= Sein Lwin =

President of Burma

Brigadier General Sein Lwin
- စိန်လွင်
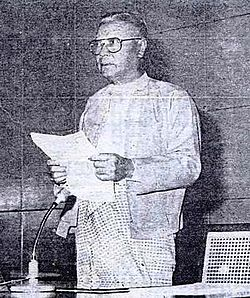

6th President of Burma
- In office 27 July 1988 – 12 August 1988
- Vice President: Aye Ko
- Preceded by: San Yu
- Succeeded by: Aye Ko (acting)

Chairman of the Burma Socialist Programme Party
- In office 26 July 1988 – 12 August 1988
- Preceded by: Ne Win
- Succeeded by: Maung Maung

Personal details
- Born: 27 January 1924 Kawkayin village, Paung, Mon State, British Burma, British Raj
- Died: 9 April 2004 (aged 80) Yangon, Myanmar
- Party: Burma Socialist Programme Party
- Spouse: Tin Tin Hline
- Children: 5
- Parent(s): Shwe Yin; Ma Ma Gyi
- Occupation: Military official, Politician

Military service
- Allegiance: Myanmar
- Branch/service: Myanmar Army
- Years of service: 1943–88
- Rank: Brigadier General

Sein Lwin (Burmese: စိန်လွင်, pronounced [sèiɰ̃ lwɪ̀ɰ̃]; 27 January 1924 – 9 April 2004) was a Burmese politician and retired military general in the Myanmar Army. He was served as the sixth president of Burma for 17 days in 1988, following the resignation of San Yu.

Sein Lwin was dubbed the "Butcher of Rangoon" for his brutal suppression of successive student-led demonstrations in the capital. He was seen as the brutal cohort of Ne Win and the man responsible for the ruthless suppression of dissent, notably antigovernment protests in 1962 in which scores of university students were slaughtered.

== Early life ==
Sein Lwin was born on 27 January 1924 in Kawkayin village, Paung, Mon State then under the British Raj to parent Shwe Yin and his wife Ma Ma Gyi. Early, he worked a school teacher in his hometown. He has a son by the name Min Lwin Oo who was a mariners (navigating officer) in the late 1980s.

== Military and governmental career ==
He joined the Army in 1943, and in 1944 joined Ne Win's 4th Burma Rifles. He is believed to have personally killed Karen rebel leader Saw Ba U Gyi.

Sein Lwin had a reputation as being a henchman for General Ne Win. He was one of those responsible for the Rangoon University Student Union massacre on 7 July 1962 when 130 university students protesting against General Ne Win's coup d'état were killed and the Student Union building dynamited the next day. Aung Gyi and Tin Pe were the senior officers, and Sein Lwin was the field commanding officer in the University region. No one knows exactly who gave the order.

In 1978, Sein Lwin became chief of staff of the Burmese armed forces with the rank of general. After serving as chief of the Mandalay and Irrawaddy division army commands, he was brought to the Burmese capital of Rangoon as joint general secretary of the party in 1981. Later, he served variously as Minister of Cooperatives, Minister of Transport, Minister of Home Affairs and Minister of Religious Affairs under the General Ne Win's cabinet.

Sein Lwin, as commander of the security force riot police (Lon Htein) was again responsible for dealing with student protests during the 1988 pro-democracy demonstrations. On 16 March, following the killing of two students, students marching on Prome Road were confronted near Inya Lake by the riot police and many beaten to death or drowned. On 17 March, soldiers and riot police entered Rangoon University and arrested hundreds of students, 41 dying in custody. As public unrest grew, a general strike was called for 8 August 1988. Sein Lwin, succeeded Ne Win as Burma Socialist Programme Party Chairman on 26 July and San Yu as President on 27 July 1988.

Sein Lwin, implementing the threat in Ne Win's "when the army shoots, it shoots to hit" resignation speech, directed troops to fire on groups of unarmed demonstrators in Yangon during the 8 August 1988 demonstrations (referred to as the 8888 Uprising), killing and wounding hundreds. Protests, more shootings and arrests continued until Sein Lwin resigned on 12 August. For these actions, he earned the nickname "Butcher of Rangoon".

The State Law and Order Restoration Council was established shortly after by Gen Saw Maung who staged a coup on 18 September 1988. Following the military takeover, the junta provided assistance to Sein Lwin, including guards, a pension, several four-wheel drive vehicles and monthly food rations. However, after the junta put Ne Win under arrest in March 2002, this assistance was removed.

Sein Lwin launched his career as leader of Burma with accusations that the country's problems were the fault of individuals, and not the ruling party.

== Death ==
Sein Lwin died on 9 April 2004 at Yangon General Hospital at the age of 80 after his return from Singapore where had sought treatment for a stomach ailment.

His death was reported in a state-run newspaper, Myanma Ahlin, which did not give a cause of death.

Political offices
Preceded by San Yu	Chairman of the Council of State and President of Burma; 27 July – 12 August 1988	Succeeded by Maung Maung
Party political offices
Preceded by Ne Win	Chairman of the Burma Socialist Programme Party; 26 July 1988 – 12 August 1988	Succeeded by Maung Maung
