= Aye Ko =

Vice President of Burma from 1985 to 1988

- အေးကို

Acting President of Burma
- In office 12 August 1988 – 19 August 1988
- Vice President: Himself
- Preceded by: Sein Lwin
- Succeeded by: Maung Maung

1st Vice President of Burma
- In office December 1985 – 18 September 1988
- President: Sein Lwin; Himself (acting); Maung Maung
- Preceded by: Office established
- Succeeded by: Office abolished; Tin Aung Myint Oo; Sai Mauk Kham (2011)

Personal details
- Born: 19 September 1921 Pathein, British Burma, British India
- Died: 26 September 2006 (aged 85) Yangon, Myanmar
- Party: BSPP

Military service
- Allegiance: Myanmar
- Branch/service: Burmese Army
- Years of service: 1952–1985
- Rank: General
- Commands: See list: Deputy Commander, No. 30 Infantry Battalion (1961) Commander, No. 1 Shan Rifle Battalion (1964) Director, Directorate of Artillery and Armour Corps (1966) Commander, 88th Light Infantry Division (1969) Commander, Strategic Operation Command (1972) Commander, North Eastern Regional Military Command (1972) Commander, North Western Regional Military Command (1974) Commander, Yangon Regional Military Command (1975) Vice Chief of Staff (Army) – (1976) Chief of Staff (Army), (1981)

Lieutenant General Aye Ko (Burmese: အေးကို, 19 September 1921 – 26 September 2006) was a Burmese army captain and the former Commander in Chief of the Armed Forces of Union of Myanmar. He held the position of Vice President of Burma for three presidents between December 1985 and September 1988.

== Military career ==
Aye Ko joined Myanmar Armed Forces on 20 April 1952 as second lieutenant for 2nd Company in No. 15 Infantry Battalion. He was promoted to the rank of lieutenant on 30 April 1953. He was transferred to No. 30 Infantry Battalion and promoted to the rank of captain on 8 July 1955.

On 27 July 1956 Aye Ko was transferred to No. 2 Military Intelligence Company attached to 8th Infantry Brigade. He became General staff officer (G3) at the headquarters of 8th Infantry Brigade on 30 October 1956. He was then transferred to No. 30 Infantry Battalion on 25 May 1960 as temporary deputy battalion commander. He was promoted to the rank of major on 3 June 1961 and became deputy battalion commander for No. 30 Infantry Battalion.

He was transferred to No. 1 Shan Rifle Battalion on 17 June 1963. He was promoted to the rank of lieutenant colonel and became commanding officer of No. 1 Shan Rifle Battalion on 20 January 1964. Aye Ko was posted to South Western Regional Military Command as colonel general staff officer (G1) on 9 September 1964.

On 2 June 1966, Aye Ko was transferred to Military Operations Department at the Ministry of Defence as colonel general staff officer (G1). He took over the role of director of the Directorate of Artillery and Armour Corps within the Ministry of Defence on 30 July 1966.

Aye Ko was posted to 88th Light Infantry Division on 24 April 1967. He was promoted to the rank of full colonel on 17 August 1968 and became deputy division commander for 88th. On 3 July 1969 Aye Ko became division commander of the 88th. He subsequently rose through the command positions as commander of Strategic Operation Command (SOC) on 24 January 1972, commander of North Eastern Regional Military Command on 11 July 1972, commander of North Western Regional Military Command on 8 March 1974, commander of Yangon Regional Military Command on 18 March 1975.

He was promoted to the rank of brigadier general on 2 April 1976 and became Vice Chief of Staff (ARMY). He was promoted to major general on 1 January 1979 and to lieutenant general on 13 March 1981 and became Chief of Staff (ARMY). Aye Ko resigned honorably from Myanmar armed forces on 19 September 1981.

== See also ==
- Military of Myanmar

== Notes ==
Military offices
Preceded by Thura Kyaw Htin	Chief of Staff (ARMY); 1976–1981	Succeeded by Tun Ye

Political offices
Preceded by Sein Lwin as President of Burma	Acting President of Myanmar; 1988	Succeeded by Maung Maung as President of Burma
