= Than Sein =

- သန်းစိန်

Member of the Pyithu Hluttaw
- Incumbent
- Assumed office 30 March 2011
- Constituency: Kyimyindaing Township
- Majority: 19,225 (42%)

Personal details
- Born: 1 February 1946 (age 80) Pegu, Burma
- Party: Union Solidarity and Development Party
- Spouse: Rosy Mya Than

Military service
- Allegiance: Myanmar
- Branch/service: Myanmar Army
- Rank: Brigadier-General

Than Sein (Burmese: သန်းစိန်) is a Burmese politician and former military officer. He currently serves as a Pyithu Hluttaw member.

Than Sein was born on 1 February 1946 in Pegu, Burma. He is married to Rosy Than Sein. He is a former Brigadier-General in the Myanmar Army, serving as a Commandant of the Mingaladon Defence Services Hospital.

Than Sein contested the 2010 Burmese general election as a Union Solidarity and Development Party candidate for the Pyithu Hluttaw, representing the Kyimyindaing Township constituency. He won the election with 19,225 votes, about 42% of the votes.
