= U Kyin =

Burmese diplomat

Thado Maha Thray Sithu U Kyin
- ဦးကျင်
- Born: 25 April 1904; British Burma
- Died: 2006 (aged 101–102); Yangon, Myanmar
- Education: University of Rangoon, Oriel College, Oxford
- Occupation: Diplomat
- Awards: Order of the British Empire

Thado Maha Thray Sithu U Kyin (25 April 1904 – 2006) was a Burmese civil servant and diplomat. He died in Yangon.

U Kyin was educated at the University of Rangoon and Oriel College, Oxford. He joined the Indian Civil Service on 28 September 1928 and began his tenure as Burma's Assistant Commissioner in October 1928. He became the Under-Secretary at Education Department in August 1932 and the Officiating Deputy Commissioner in October 1934. In December 1935, he became the Joint Registrar at the Co-operative Societies Department, moving up to Officiating Registrar in March 1937. In January 1939, he was promoted to Deputy Commissioner, and to Secretary of the Agriculture and Forests Department in February 1941. He was part of the Civil Affairs Service from May to October 1945 and became Secretary of the Social Services Department in October 1945. U Kyin was awarded the Order of the British Empire (O.B.E.) in 1946 for his service.

He later went on to become the ambassador of the Union of Burma to the Republic of India (1951—1955), to the Court of St. James's or the UK (1955—1956) and to the USSR (1956—1962).
