= San Yu =

President of Myanmar from 1981 to 1988

His Excellency General San Yu
- စန်းယု
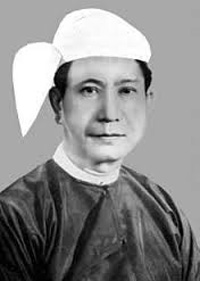
- San Yu c. 1950s

5th President of Burma
- In office 9 November 1981 – 27 July 1988
- Prime Minister: Maung Maung Kha
- Vice President: Aye Ko (1985–1988)
- Preceded by: Ne Win
- Succeeded by: Sein Lwin

Personal details
- Born: 3 March 1918 Thegon, Pegu, British Raj India
- Died: 28 January 1996 (aged 77) Yangon, Myanmar
- Party: BSPP
- Spouse: Than Shein
- Children: 4
- Education: Rangoon University Medical College
- Occupation: President
- Awards: Independence Mawgunwin (First Class)

Military service
- Allegiance: (Myanmar) Burma
- Branch/service: Burmese Army
- Years of service: 1942–1980
- Rank: General
- Commands: CO, Northern RMC (1959); CO, 1st Infantry Brigade (1961); CO, Eastern RMC (1961); CO, North West RMC (1961); Vice Chief of Staff (Army) (1963); Commander in Chief (1972)

San Yu (Burmese: စန်းယု, pronounced [sáɰ̃ jṵ]; 3 March 1918 – 28 January 1996) was a Burmese army general and statesman who served as the fifth president of Myanmar from 9 November 1981 to 27 July 1988.

== Biography ==
San Yu was born in Thegon during the British Raj era. He was born to U Shane Wat and Daw Thein Shein. He studied medicine at Rangoon University's Medical College for two years.

== Military career ==
San Yu joined Burma Independence Army in 1942 from his hometown Prome (now Pyay) and became a second lieutenant of 3rd Burma Rifle Battalion on 14 January 1946. Throughout his army career, San Yu rose through the rank quickly due to his steadfast loyalty towards his superiors. On 23 January 1947, San Yu was promoted to captain and became deputy company commander in the same battalion and on 24 February 1949, three years after joining the army, he was promoted to the rank of Major and became Deputy Battalion Commander of 3rd Burma Rifle.

He was made lieutenant colonel on 25 November 1949 and given the command of 1st Karenni Rifle Battalion. He was then transferred to 1st Kachin Rifle Battalion on 22 December 1950. Throughout 1950 and 1951, he served under Brigadier General Ne Win's Northern Regional Military Command in various capacities. He was then transferred to Military Appointment General's office within the Ministry of Defense on 17 September 1952.

On 9 March 1956, he was promoted to the rank of colonel and became the Commander of Northern Regional Military Command on 25 February 1959. He was promoted to brigadier general on 9 April 1959. He then became commander of 1st Infantry Brigade on 16 August 1961, commander of Eastern Regional Military Command on 16 October 1961 and commander of North West Regional Military Command on 29 November 1961.

After the 1962 military coup, Brigadier General San Yu became Deputy Chief of Staff of the Army on 15 February 1963. He was promoted to the rank of general and became Commander in Chief of the Tatmadaw (Armed Forces) on 20 April 1972, and also Minister of Defense.

== Civilian career ==
Brigadier General San Yu was a founding member of the General Ne Win's 17 members Union Revolutionary Council (RC) that came to power after the military coup overthrowing the civilian government of Prime Minister U Nu on 2 March 1962. He was Minister of Finance from 1963 to 1972. He was appointed as Chairman of the 'New State Constitution Drafting Commission' (NSCDC) which was formed by the Revolutionary Council on 25 September 1971. During the years 1971 to 1973, He travelled extensively throughout Burma as Chairman of NSCDC during the 'drafting process' of Constitution of the Socialist Republic of the Union of Burma, better known as 1974 Burmese Constitution.

On 20 April 1972, the Revolutionary Council made an announcement that Brigadier General San Yu was promoted to General. General San Yu became general secretary of the Council of State for the Burma Socialist Programme Party, better known as BSPP, on 26 April 1974 was transferred to Office of the State Council. He retired from the Army on 3 March 1978. In the closing day of the Fourth Congress of the BSPP, Ne Win also announced his intention to retire from the position of 'President of the Socialist Republic of the Union of Burma' after the 'elections' in October 1981.

On 9 November 1981 the then Burmese Legislature (Pyithu Hluttaw) elected San Yu as the President of the Socialist Republic of the Union of Burma. He served in that position until 27 July 1988 and in the post-independence period he became, after Ne Win (who was president from 4 March 1974 to 9 November 1981) the second-longest serving president in post-independent Burma. Ne Win remained chairman of the BSPP, and it was generally understood that he still held the real power.

In the fifth BSPP Congress that was held in August 1985 San Yu was formally elected as vice chairman of BSPP. From then on till his retirement from both the Party (BSPP) and State positions San Yu was termed in the media as Vice Chairman of Burma Socialist Programme Party, President and Chairman of the Council of State, under the provision of the 1974 Constitution the Chairman of the Council of State is also the President of the Republic.

On 23 July 1988, in the opening day of the BSPP Congress, an announcement made by Ne Win that San Yu along with four other Party and State leaders had expressed the wish to retire from both Party and State positions. Though the BSPP Congress rejected the resignations or requests for permission to retire of U Aye Ko, general secretary and Vice President of the State, U Sein Lwin, Joint General Secretary of BSPP and secretary of the Council of State, U Tun Tin, BSPP Central Executive Committee member and Deputy Prime Minister, U Kyaw Htin, BSPP Central Executive Committee Member and Defence Minister, the congress accepted the resignations of Ne Win and San Yu from party and state positions.

After his retirement, throughout the turmoil that ensued the 1988 pro-democracy demonstrations and military coup, San Yu stayed out of the political societies and lived with his family in his suburban Yangon home. He followed the path set by Buddhism and died peacefully on 28 January 1996.

Military offices
Preceded by Ne Win	Chief of Staff of Defence Services; 1972–1974	Succeeded by Tin Oo
Political offices
Preceded by Ne Win	Chairman of the Council of State and President of Burma; 1981–1988	Succeeded by Sein Lwin
