= Saw Maung =

Military ruler of Myanmar from 1988 to 1992

Senior General Saw Maung
- စောမောင်

1st Chairman of the State Law and Order Restoration Council
- In office 18 September 1988 – 23 April 1992
- Deputy: Than Shwe
- Preceded by: Maung Maung (as President)
- Succeeded by: Than Shwe

Prime Minister of Burma
- In office 21 September 1988 – 23 April 1992
- Preceded by: Tun Tin
- Succeeded by: Than Shwe

Commander-in-Chief of the Armed Forces of Myanmar
- In office 4 November 1985 – 23 April 1992
- Deputy: Than Shwe
- Preceded by: Kyaw Htin
- Succeeded by: Than Shwe

Personal details
- Born: 5 December 1928 Mandalay, Upper Burma, British India
- Died: 24 July 1997 (aged 68) Yangon, Union of Myanmar
- Party: BSPP (until 1988); SLORC
- Spouse: Aye Yee
- Children: Thiha Saw; Kay Thi Saw; Thura Saw
- Awards: Alinkar Kyawswar

Military service
- Allegiance: Myanmar
- Branch/service: Myanmar Army
- Years of service: 1945–1992
- Rank: Senior General

Saw Maung (Burmese: စောမောင်; pronounced [sɔ́ màʊɰ̃]; 5 December 1928 – 24 July 1997) was a Burmese military leader and statesman who served as Chairman of the State Law and Order Restoration Council (SLORC) and Prime Minister of Burma from 1988 until 1992, when he was deposed by rival generals who disapproved Saw Maung decisions that were in favor of Aung San Suu Kyi. Besides this, he was the 8th Commander-in-Chief of the Tatmadaw. He was the first Burmese general to get the rank of Senior General, which was created for him in 1990.

== Early life and career ==
He was born on 5 December 1928 in Mandalay, British Burma. Saw Maung joined the army in 1945, three years before the country gained independence from Britain, and received a commission in 1952. From 1974 to 1976, he fought against communist insurgents and ethnic rebels along the border with Thailand. In 1976, he became a brigadier general, and in 1981 an adjutant-general. He became armed forces commander in 1983.

Saw Maung was army chief of staff and defence minister in the brief government of Sein Lwin and became chairman of the junta when the army staged its coup in 1988 after the 8888 Uprising. He was an effective ruler of the country as head of the State Law and Order Restoration Council (SLORC). He also held the posts of prime minister and minister of foreign affairs. As a high-ranking member of the Burma Socialist Programme Party (BSPP), he provided continuity of leadership during a succession of short-lived predecessors that followed the toppling of Ne Win earlier in 1988.

== Chairman of SLORC ==
Saw Maung assumed responsibility as chairman of the newly formed State Law and Order Restoration Council (SLORC) on 18 September 1988, replacing the Burma Socialist Programme Party (BSPP) and promised multi-party elections to follow soon. However, following the coup, a series of killings against protestors who took part in the uprising followed. The scale of killing was so large that Saw Maung was compared internationally to the dictatorships of Augusto Pinochet in Chile, and Duvalier in Haiti. He publicly stated that he would hand over power to the winning party and would have the army return to the barracks; where in his own words they "rightfully belonged". This proved to be too much for hardliners in the military and loyalists of Ne Win. SLORC held free elections in 1990. The 1990 parliamentary elections were won by the National League for Democracy (NLD) led by Aung San Suu Kyi. Saw Maung was willing to hand the power to the civilian government; however, other generals representing the hardline faction of the SLORC did not agree to this, and successfully prohibited Saw Maung from respecting the results. At this point he lost control of the military junta, and acted as a figurehead.

Saw Maung resigned as chairman of SLORC in April 1992. According to the military junta this was for health reasons. However, this was the result of Saw Maung being sedated, isolated and quietly removed from power in a palace coup, after which it was widely reported that Saw Maung's mental health was rapidly deteriorating, and that he believed himself to be the reincarnation of an 11th-century warrior-king. His departure however was orchestrated by Than Shwe and Maung Aye, who used Saw Maung's weakness as an opportunity to seize power and preserve the hardline profile of the military junta.

Saw Maung then lived in quiet retirement and subsequently died on 24 July 1997 due to a heart attack.

== Family and personal life ==
He married Daw Aye Yee, who died on 25 December 2004. He is survived by three children; two sons and a daughter, and three grandchildren.

Saw Maung was also a golfer and a devout Buddhist.

Political offices
Preceded by Maung Maung (as Chairman of the Council of State and President of Burma)	Chairman of the State Law and Order Restoration Council; 1988–1992	Succeeded by Than Shwe
Preceded by Tun Tin	Prime Minister of Burma; 1988–1992	Succeeded by Than Shwe
Military offices
Preceded by Kyaw Htin	Chief of Staff of Defence Services; After 1989 Commander-in-Chief of Defence Services; 1985–1992	Succeeded by Than Shwe
