= Max Myanmar =

Major Burmese holding company

Max Myanmar Group of Companies
- Native name: မက်စ်မြန်မာကုမ္ပဏီအုပ်စု
- Company type: Privately held company
- Industry: Conglomerate
- Predecessor: Max Myanmar’s Trading Company
- Founded: 1993; 33 years ago
- Founder: Zaw Zaw
- Headquarters: Yangon, Myanmar
- Key people: Zaw Zaw
- Products: Banking, Cement and rubbers
- Services: Banking, Hotel, Construction, Manufacturing, Petroleum, Gems and jewellery, Trading, Services
- Subsidiaries: Ayeyarwady Bank
- Website: www.maxmyanmargroup.com

Max Myanmar Group of Companies (Burmese: မက်စ်မြန်မာကုမ္ပဏီအုပ်စု) is a major Burmese holding company with former interests in gems and active interests in construction, mechanical engineering, transportation, hotel and tourism, rubber plantations, energy retail and banking industries. Max Myanmar is owned by Zaw Zaw.

== History ==
The Max Myanmar Group of Companies was originally established as Max Myanmar Co., Ltd. in 1993. It started operation by importing buses from Japan, simultaneously followed by import of generators and earth-moving equipment and machinery. The company has since diversified its portfolio, to include not only import-export, but also construction, hospitality and tourism, manufacturing, banking services and gems mining. Through an aggressive growth strategy, the company steadily expanded and diversified into the fields of civil construction, mechanical engineering, transportation, hotel, rubber plantations and banking industry.

== Portfolio ==
The company was involved in the construction of Naypyidaw, Burma's new capital. It built and operates Royal Kumudra Hotel. Max Myanmar also constructed Zabudipa Stadium for the 2013 Southeast Asian Games, to be held in Naypyidaw.

Max Myanmar is also involved in a $120 million USD infrastructure project, the Kaladan Multi-Modal Transit Transport Project, with Essar Group, an Indian firm. The project will link the landlocked Indian state of Mizoram to Sittwe in Burma's Rakhine State and allow cargo vessels to travel along the Kaladan River.

On 23 March 2008, Max Myanmar launched Nay Pyi Taw Taxi and Car Rental Service, a metered taxi service, to Naypyidaw.

In 2010, Max Myanmar acquired a 60% share (worth K 5 billion) in the development of Pyay Towers (a high-rise complex that will include a shopping center, offices and apartments).

In August 2010, Max Myanmar opened its private bank, Ayeyarwady Bank, with nationwide branches, after receiving a banking operation license from the Central Bank of Myanmar.

On 13 March 2011, 550 bedded Yankin Children's Hospital, which Max Myanmar redeveloped, equipped and furnished a former Ministry of Mining building at a cost of K9 billion (US$10 million), opened to help ease the strain on the city’s other paediatric facility.

In April 2011, Max Myanmar won a government auction bid to buy the Department of Population office in Yangon's Kyauktada Township, at the cost of K15 billion.

On 4 January 2012, the company opened Ayeyarwady Hotel, the first hotel at Naypyidaw's National Landmark Garden. The 15 acres (6.1 ha) complex was built at a cost of $35 million USD. On 22 January 2011, Max Myanmar signed a production-sharing contract with the Burmese Ministry of Mines to produce coal at a 5,200 acres (2,100 ha) plot in Sagaing Region's Kalewa Township.

In July 2012, a struggling Singaporean bed linen maker Aussino Group proposed a $47.38 million USD reverse takeover by Max Myanmar. In this deal, Aussino would issue shares to buy a new firm called Max Strategic Investments (MSI), to provide capital of Max Myanmar to operate petrol stations in Burma and give Max Myanmar majority control of the Singaporean firm. Max Myanmar currently operates 21 petrol stations in Burma. In the 2011-2012 fiscal year, MSI had a reported consolidated revenue of $75 million USD. They also involved in cement industry this year.

In July 2012, Zaw Zaw announced that Max Myanmar would be withdrawing from its involvement (and $2 million USD of shares) in a massive $50 billion USD project to construct a special economic zone (with a port and industrial complex) in Dawei.

In December 2012, Max Myanmar Company has paid 13 local land owners more than 700 million kyats (US$806,000) in compensation for the acquirement of farmlands in Ngwehsaung Sub-township, Ayeyawady Region. The company paid a total of 728.5 million kyats (US$838,400) for 106 acres of land and it was the first time such compensation has been paid to landowners and it is the largest amount paid ever, according to locals, and the farmers were pleased.

In 2013, acquired a majority 60-per cent stake in the Pyay Towers project for US$5.8 million, one of Yangon's most prominent property developments.

Max Myanmar responded to the land-grab problems happening in the country in 2013 as Zaw Zaw pledged to return unused land that had been acquired through the government.

== CSR ==
Ever since the establishment of Max Myanmar in 1993, the company has been actively taking part in its CSR. Ayeyarwady Foundation was set up in 2010 as a Non-Profit Organization (NPO) to focus on 5 pillars of philanthropy such as Youth Development and Sports Programme, Health, Education, Disaster Management, Responsible Business Practices Program.

During the Covid-19 crisis, Ayeyarwady Foundation contributed nearly US$2 million to Myanmar fight against the coronavirus outbreak since March.

Max Energy, one of the subsidiaries of Max Myanmar Group contributed 1 billion MMK by offering discounted fuel price for selling 7.7 million of petrol litres for healthcare workers, ambulances, CSOs and taxi drivers during COVID-19 crisis.

== Controversies ==
In 2004, Max Myanmar was involved in the illegal confiscation of 5,000 acres (2,000 ha) of land in Mon and Kayin States to plant rubber plantations. The rubber plantation, located in Bilin Township, is joint venture between Max Myanmar and a military-owned company.

On 23 September 2009, Delta United FC (now Ayeyawady United F.C.), owned by Max Cement (a subsidiary of Max Myanmar), was involved in a controversial win against Yadanabon F.C., whose fans accused Zaw Zaw of unfairly influencing the referee during the match. On 28 September, Zaw Zaw transferred ownership of the football club to Premier Coffee, citing a conflict of interest, as he also serves as the chairman of the Myanmar Football Federation.

In April 2010, Max Myanmar Construction constructed a 500 feet (150 m)-long Thingyan pandal (water pavilion) for Nay Shwe Thway Aung, the grandson of Than Shwe by the shores of Yangon's Inya Lake, despite city regulations that limit the length of pavilions to less than 140 feet (43 m).

Max Myanmar has been known to dump earth from its jade mines into the Uru and Nanmayang streams in Kachin State.

As of 2012, Max Myanmar has also been involved in land seizures in Dagon Seikkan Township, forcing it to implement a mutual profit-sharing system with farmers.

In 2017, the Burmese military launched a fundraising campaign to fund "clearance operations" in northern Rakhine State, as part of the broader Rohingya conflict. In response, Max Myanmar's Ayeyarwady Foundation donated over 1.368 billion kyats (approximately US$976,857) to the armed forces.
