= 2008 Constitution of Myanmar =

Current supreme legal document of the Republic of the Union of Myanmar

Constitution of the Republic of the Union of Myanmar (2008)
- Created: 9 April 2008
- Ratified: 29 May 2008
- Date effective: 31 January 2011
- Amended: 22 July 2015; 26 March 2020
- Purpose: To replace the 1974 Constitution of the Socialist Republic of the Union of Burma

The Constitution of the Republic of the Union of Myanmar (2008) (Burmese: ပြည်ထောင်စုသမ္မတမြန်မာနိုင်ငံတော် ဖွဲ့စည်းပုံအခြေခံဥပဒေ (၂၀၀၈ ခုနှစ်)) is the third Constitution of Myanmar after the 1947 and 1974 constitutions were suspended following military coups. It is part of the seven-step roadmap announced by then Prime Minister of State Peace and Development Council government General Khin Nyunt on 30 August 2003. One of the seven steps include recalling the National Convention for the drafting of new constitution.

The military, Tatmadaw, translated as Defence Services, retained significant control of the government under the 2008 constitution. 25% of the seats in the legislature, Pyidaungsu Hluttaw, were reserved for serving military officers. The ministries of home, border affairs and defense had to be headed by serving military officers. The military also appoints one of the country's two vice presidents. Hence, the country's civilian leaders have little influence over the security establishment.

== History ==
The National Convention was adjourned on 31 March 1996 by State Law and Order Restoration Council government.

The convention restarted on 17 May 2004 and was attended by 1076 of invited delegates and representatives from 25 ethnic ceasefire groups. After several sessions, the convention concluded with the adoption of fundamental principles for a 54-member constitution drafting commission, which was later formed by the SPDC. On 19 February 2008, the SPDC announced that the commission had finalised the drafted constitution and planned to hold a referendum in May 2008.

On 10 May 2008 (24 May 2008 in some townships), the 2008 constitutional referendum was held in Myanmar, and the SPDC announced 93.82% of the voters voted for the constitution. However, there has been widespread criticism of the process as the Cyclone Nargis hit Myanmar a few days before the referendum and questions remain about whether the overall process was free and fair.

The 2008 Constitution came into force on 31 January 2011. Two amendments have been made, in 2015 and 2020 respectively. The first amendment was initiated by the then-ruling party Union Solidarity and Development Party in 2013 and the Pyidaungsu Hluttaw enacted the amendment on 22 July 2015. The National League for Democracy, the then-ruling party, initiated the second process for amendment in 2019 and the amendment was enacted by the Pyidaungsu Hluttaw on 26 March 2020.

== Role of the military ==
Under the 2008 Constitution, the Defence Services (Tatmadaw) maintains significant control over the Union Government:

- Parliamentary seats: 25 percent of the total seats in the Pyidaungsu Hluttaw are reserved for serving military personnel.
- Key Ministries: The Ministries of Home Affairs, Border Affairs, and Defence must be headed by a serving military officer.
- Vice President: The Tatmadaw also appoints one of the country's two Vice Presidents.

As a result, civilian leaders have minimal influence over the security establishment.

== Chapters of the Constitution ==
The Constitution includes the following chapters:

- Preamble
- Chapter (1) Basic Principles of the Union
- Chapter (2) State Structure
- Chapter (3) Head of State
- Chapter (4) Legislature
- Chapter (5) Executive
- Chapter (6) Judiciary
- Chapter (7) Defence Services
- Chapter (8) Citizen, Fundamental Rights and Duties of the Citizens
- Chapter (9) Election
- Chapter (10) Political Parties
- Chapter (11) Provisions on State of Emergency
- Chapter (12) Amendment of the Constitution
- Chapter (13) State Flag, State Seal, National Anthem and the Capital
- Chapter (14) Transitory Provisions
- Chapter (15) General Provisions

Key Provisions

=== Preamble ===
The Preamble briefly recounts Myanmar's struggle for independence, mentions the suspension of the previous two Constitutions, and states the necessity of a durable Constitution. It concludes with the national resolve to uphold key principles:

- Non-disintegration of the Union, non-disintegration of national solidarity, and perpetuation of sovereignty.
- Furthering the eternal principles of justice, liberty, and equality.
- Upholding racial equality and fostering the Union Spirit through eternal unity.
- Constantly endeavoring to uphold the principles of peaceful co-existence with a view to world peace and friendly relations among nations.

=== Chapter (1) Basic Principles of the Union ===
This chapter defines the State and establishes its fundamental principles (Sections 6 to 48). State Objectives (Section 6): The State consistently aims for the following six objectives:

- Non-disintegration of the Union.
- Non-disintegration of national solidarity.
- Perpetuation of sovereignty.
- Flourishing of a genuine, disciplined, multi-party democratic system.
- Further flourishing of the cardinal principles of justice, liberty, and equality in the State.
- For the Defence Services to be able to participate in the national political leadership role of the State.

Sovereignty and State Structure:

- The State adopts a multi-party democratic system.
- The State is organized on the basis of a Union System.
- No part of the State's territory has the right to secede (Section 10).
- The three powers of State sovereignty—Legislative, Executive, and Judicial—are separated as much as possible and checked and balanced against one another.
- Sovereign powers are distributed among the Union, Regions and States.
- The President is the Head of State and the Head of the Executive (Section 16).

Other Principles:

- Judicial Principles (Section 19): Includes independent administration of justice in accordance with the law, public administration of justice (except as restricted by law), and the right to legal defence and appeal.
- Defence Services (Section 20): The Defence Services is the sole patriotic armed force and has the primary duty of safeguarding the Constitution. The Commander-in-Chief of Defence Services is the supreme commander of all armed forces.
- Economy (Sections 35, 36): The State adopts a market economy system, does not permit monopolization or speculation, and will not nationalize economic enterprises or declare legal currency illegal, except in certain circumstances.
- State of Emergency (Section 40(c)): The Defence Services has the constitutional right to officially take over power in certain states of emergency.
- Foreign Policy (Sections 41, 42): The State practices an independent, non-aligned foreign policy and adheres to the principles of peaceful co-existence. The State will not initiate aggression against any nation and will not allow any foreign troops to be stationed within its territory.

Citizen Rights and Duties (Excerpts)

- Equality and Liberty (Section 21): Every citizen enjoys the right of equality, the right of liberty, and the right of justice. No citizen shall be held in custody for more than 24 hours without the permission of a Court.
- National Races Development (Section 22): The State shall assist in the development of the language, literature, fine arts, and culture of the national races, and shall assist in the socio-economic development (education, health, economy, transportation) of less-developed national races.
- Civil Service (Section 26): Civil Service personnel shall be free from party politics.
- Freedom of Religion (Section 34): Citizens shall equally enjoy the right to freely profess and practice religion.

=== Chapter (2) State Structure ===
- The State is structurally composed of 7 Regions, 7 States, and Union Territories (Section 49):
1. Kachin State,
2. Kayah State,
3. Kayin State,
4. Chin State,
5. Sagaing Region,
6. Taninthayi Region,
7. Bago Region,
8. Magway Region,
9. Mandalay Region,
10. Mon State,
11. Rakhine State,
12. Yangon Region,
13. Shan State,
14. Ayeyarwady Region, and
15. Union Territories.
- Nay Pyi Taw, the capital, is designated as a Union Territory under the direct administration of the President (Section 50).
- Section 51 defines the hierarchical organization of the State's administrative units (villages, wards, townships, districts, Regions/States).
- Self-Administered Zones and Divisions (Section 56): The Constitution specifies the areas and townships that constitute the six Self-Administered Zones and Divisions:
1. Naga Self-Administered Zone: Leshi, Lahe, and Nanyun Townships in Sagaing Region.
2. Danu Self-Administered Zone: Ywangan and Pindaya Townships in Shan State.
3. Pa-O Self-Administered Zone: Hopong, Hsisheng, and Pinlaung Townships in Shan State.
4. Palaung Self-Administered Zone: Namhsan and Mantong Townships in Shan State.
5. Kokang Self-Administered Zone: Kunlong and Laukkai Townships in Shan State.
6. Wa Self-Administered Division: Hopang, Mongmao, Pangwai, Namphan, Mehmah, and Panghsang (Pangkham) Townships in Shan State, grouped into two Districts.

=== Chapter (3) Head of State ===
The President and Vice-Presidents represent the State (Section 57). The President holds the highest position as the head of all citizens throughout the Republic of the Union of Myanmar (Section 58). According to Section 59, key qualifications include:

- Loyalty to the Union and its citizens.
- Being a citizen of Myanmar born of parents who were both born within the territory under the jurisdiction of the Union and are Myanmar Nationals.
- Must be at least 45 years old.
- Possessing political, administrative, economic, and military knowledge.
- Having resided continuously in the Union for at least 20 years up to the time of election (with an exception for periods of foreign travel with State permission).
- Neither the person, nor one of their parents, spouse, legal child, or the spouse of a legal child, can owe allegiance to a foreign power, be a subject of a foreign power, or be a citizen of a foreign country, nor be entitled to the rights and privileges enjoyed by a subject or citizen of a foreign country.
- Must meet all qualifications set for a Hluttaw representative, in addition to specific qualifications for the President.

Election Process: The President is elected by the Presidential Electoral College, which comprises three groups: one group from the elected representatives of the Pyithu Hluttaw, one group from the elected representatives of the Amyotha Hluttaw, and one group of Defence Services Personnel Representatives nominated by the Commander-in-Chief of Defence Services. Each group selects one Vice-President, and the President is then elected by a vote among the three Vice-Presidents. Term of Office: The term of office is five years, and no person shall serve for more than two terms. Impeachment: The President or a Vice-President may be impeached for:

- Treason.
- Violation of the Constitution.
- Misconduct.
- Disqualification under the Constitution.
- Not performing duties assigned by law.

If at least two-thirds of the total members of the Hluttaw investigating the charge decide that the charge is true and the offence renders the person unfit to hold office, the President or Vice-President shall be removed from office.

=== Chapter (7) Defence Services ===
The Defence Services (Note: official English name of Tatmadaw) is the main armed force for national defence. All armed forces in the State are under the command of the Defence Services. The Defence Services is responsible for leading the defence of the State against internal and external dangers. It has the right to manage and carry out affairs concerning the participation of the entire people in security and defence, with the concurrence of the National Defence and Security Council (Sections 337 to 344). The Commander-in-Chief of Defence Services is appointed by the President upon the proposal and recommendation of the National Defence and Security Council (Section 342).

=== Chapter (10) Political Parties ===
Political Parties must adhere to the objectives of non-disintegration of the Union, non-disintegration of national solidarity, and perpetuation of sovereignty. They must be loyal to the State, abide by the Constitution and existing laws, and be legally registered. They have the right to organize freely and contest in elections (Sections 404 to 406). A political party's right to exist shall be revoked, and its registration cancelled, if, among other things, it is declared an unlawful association, has direct or indirect contact with armed rebel groups or terrorist organizations, receives and uses financial or other support directly or indirectly from a foreign government, religious organization, or other foreign entity, or misuses religion for political purposes (Sections 407, 408).

=== Chapter (12) Amendment of the Constitution ===
The process for amending the Constitution is detailed in Sections 433, 434, and 435. A bill to amend the Constitution must be submitted to the Pyidaungsu Hluttaw and must be accepted for deliberation if presented by at least 20 percent of the total Hluttaw representatives. Amending Key Provisions (Section 436(a)): Provisions in key sections of Chapters 1, 2, 3, 4, 5, 6, 11, and 12 (including those on State sovereignty, secession, President's qualifications, role of the Defence Services, and emergency provisions) can only be amended if:

- The amendment is approved by more than 75 percent of all representatives of Pyidaungsu Hluttaw.
- The amendment is then approved by more than half of the total number of eligible voters in a national referendum.

Amending Other Provisions (Section 436(b)): Other provisions can be amended with the support of more than 75 percent of all representatives of the Pyidaungsu Hluttaw (without a referendum).

=== Chapter (13) State Flag, State Seal, National Anthem and the Capital ===
This chapter (Sections 437, 438, 439, 440) prescribes the State Flag, the State Seal, the National Anthem, and the Capital (which is Nay Pyi Taw).

== See also ==
- Constitution of Myanmar – contains significant information about the 2008 Constitution
- 2015 Myanmar constitutional referendum – postponed referendum for amendment
