= Tin Sein =

Burmese military official (1926–2020)

Major General Tin Sein
- တင်စိန်

Deputy Minister for Defence of Myanmar
- In office c. 1980–?

Personal details
- Born: 22 February 1927 Rangoon, British Burma
- Died: 15 August 2020 (aged 93)
- Relations: Nay Shwe Thway Aung (grandson)
- Children: Nay Soe Maung
- Occupation: Military general, Union Minister

Military service
- Allegiance: Myanmar
- Branch/service: Myanmar Army
- Rank: Major General

Major General Tin Sein (Burmese: တင်စိန်, 22 February 1927 – 15 August 2020) was a Burmese military official and major general in the Myanmar Army. He has served as Deputy Minister of Defence of Myanmar under Ne Win's cabinet.

In 1979, he was promoted to major general in the Myanmar Army and served as a military regional command. He took on the role of the first minister in the Ministry of Livestock and Fisheries, which was the first to be established in Myanmar's civil sector. In 1983, he retired from the military and was appointed as the Burmese ambassador to Vietnam.

Tin Sein's son, Nay Soe Maung married Kyi Kyi Shwe, the daughter of Than Shwe, Myanmar's dictator and formerly head of a military junta.

Tin Sein died on 15 August 2020.
