= Khin Nyunt =

Prime Minister of Myanmar from 2003 to 2004

His Excellency General Khin Nyunt
- ခင်ညွန့်
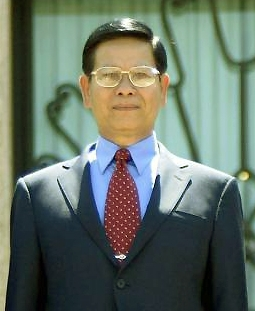
- Khin Nyunt in 2004

Prime Minister of Myanmar
- In office 25 August 2003 – 18 October 2004
- Leader: Than Shwe
- Preceded by: Than Shwe
- Succeeded by: Soe Win

Secretary 1 of the State Peace and Development Council
- In office 15 November 1997 – 25 August 2003
- Preceded by: Position established
- Succeeded by: Soe Win

Secretary 1 of the State Law and Order Restoration Council
- In office 18 September 1988 – 15 November 1997
- Preceded by: Position established
- Succeeded by: Position abolished

Director of Defence Service Intelligence
- In office 1984 – 18 October 2004
- Preceded by: Kyaw Win
- Succeeded by: Myint Swe

Personal details
- Born: 23 October 1939 (age 86) Kyauktan Township, British Burma (present-day Myanmar)
- Citizenship: Burmese
- Spouse: Khin Win Shwe
- Children: Lt.-Col. Zaw Naing Oo, Dr. Ye Naing Win
- Education: Officers Training School, Bahtoo

Military service
- Allegiance: Myanmar
- Branch/service: Myanmar Army
- Years of service: 1960–2004
- Rank: General

Khin Nyunt (Burmese: ခင်ညွန့်, MLCTS: hkang nywan; pronounced [kʰɪ̀ɰ̃ ɲʊ̰ɰ̃]; born 23 October 1939) is a retired Burmese army general widely recognized for his influential role in shaping Myanmar's political dynamics. Serving as the Chief of Intelligence and Prime Minister of Myanmar from 25 August 2003 to 18 October 2004, he played a crucial part in the nation's history. During his tenure, Khin Nyunt oversaw significant developments in Myanmar's intelligence and apparatus and government policies. He was instrumental in implementing reforms aimed at modernizing intelligence operations and promoting national security interests. However his leadership faced challenges, and he was eventually removed from power in 2004 amid political reshuffles within the ruling military junta. Despite his removal from office, Khin Nyunt's legacy continued to be debated, with some viewing him as a reformist figure and others critiquing his approach to governance.

Born on 23 October 1939 in Kyauktan Township, near Rangoon (now Yangon), His early life was marked by a unique cultural heritage. Hailing from a family of Burmese Chinese descent, his parents were Hakkas from Meixian, Meizhou, Guangdong, China. Khin Nyunt played a significant role in Myanmar's political landscape. Khin Nyunt graduated from the 25th batch of the Officers Training School, Bahtoo, in 1960, after he dropped out of Yankin College in the 1950s, forging a path that would intertwine with intelligence operations and key political roles. His military career led him to the position of Chief of Intelligence, where he played a crucial role in the country's internal security. His political journey reached its pinnacle when he assumed the office of Prime Minister of Myanmar on 25 August 2003, succeeding Senior General Than Shwe. However, his tenure was short-lived, lasting until 18 October 2004. As Prime Minister, Khin Nyunt faced challenges and controversies, including the proposal of a seven-point roadmap to democracy, criticized for its perceived lack of clarity and military involvement. His leadership oversaw the recalling of the suspended National Convention, influencing Myanmar's political trajectory. Dismissed from power on 18 October 2004 amid internal military struggles, Khin Nyunt faced corruption charges and received a 44-year prison sentence. Released from house arrest on 13 January 2012, he entered a new phase, establishing a presence in Yangon with a coffee shop, art gallery, and souvenir shop. In an interview in April 2012, Khin Nyunt claimed that he personally intervened to save Aung San Suu Kyi's life during the Depayin massacre, by ordering his men to take her to a safe location.

== Early life and education ==
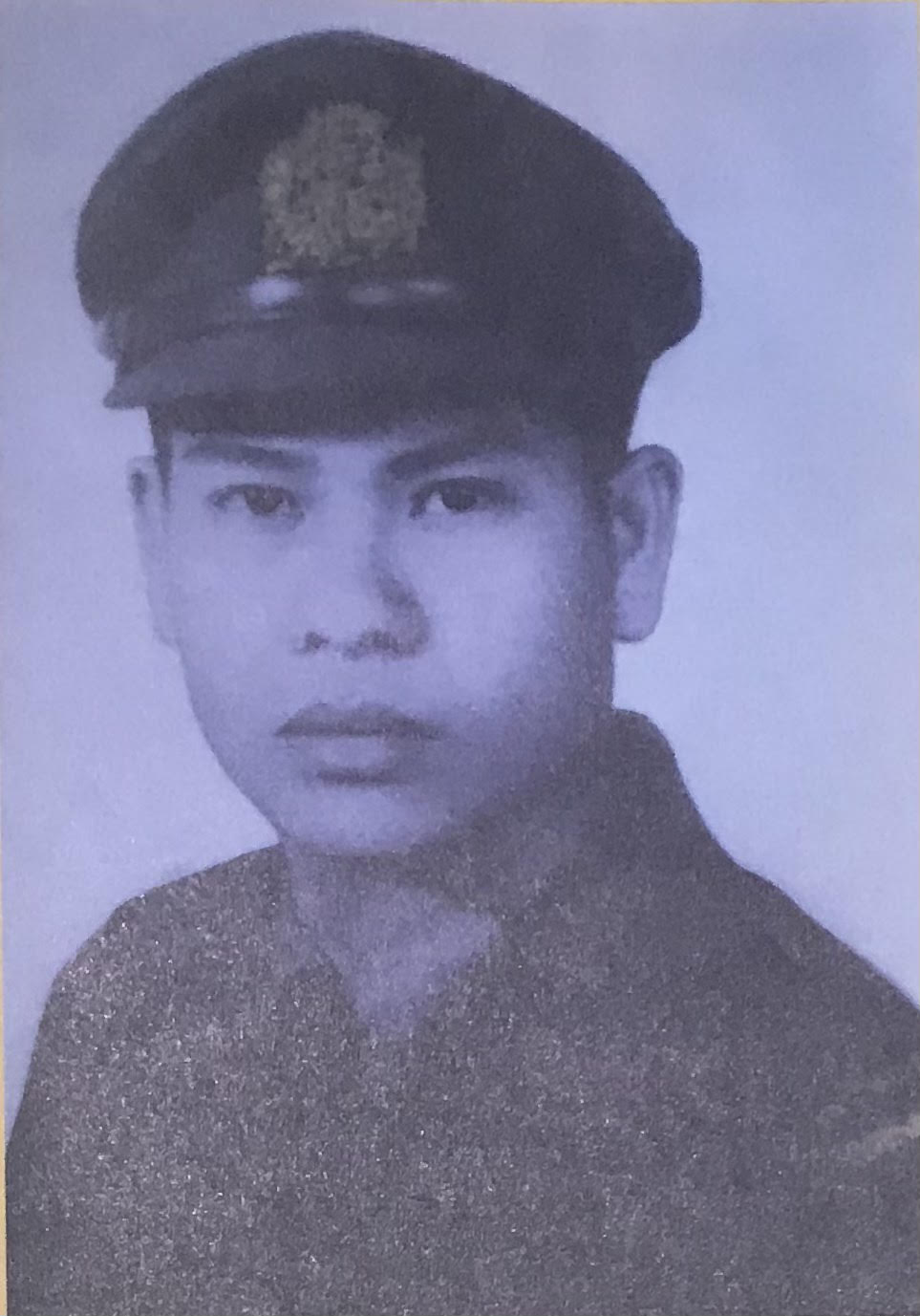
Khin Nyunt as a Lieutenant in 1962.

Khin Nyunt was born on 23 October 1939, in Kyauktan Township, near Rangoon (now Yangon). He is of Burmese Chinese descent, with parents who were Hakkas from Meixian, Meizhou, Guangdong, China.

Khin Nyunt graduated from the 25th batch of the Officers Training School, Bahtoo in 1960, after dropping out of Yankin College in the late 1950s.

== Political career ==
After his military career, he was ordered back to Rangoon in 1984 after an attack on a visiting South Korean delegation. Twenty-one people, including three South Korean cabinet ministers, died during the attack, which occurred on 9 October 1983 and was perpetrated by terrorists sent from North Korea. Khin Nyunt was then appointed Chief of Intelligence. From the mid-1980s to the late 1990s Khin Nyunt was considered to be a protégé of General Ne Win, who supposedly retired from politics on 23 July 1988 but who is thought to have continued to be an influential figure behind the scenes until about the late 1990s.

The 1988 uprising that occurred from March to September 1988 was quelled by the military when the State Law and Order Restoration Council (SLORC) was formed on 18 September 1988. The State Law and Order Restoration Council (SLORC) was renamed as the State Peace and Development Council (SPDC) on 15 November 1997, and Khin Nyunt was appointed as its first secretary (Secretary −1), a post which he held until his appointment as prime minister on 25 August 2003.

Shortly after Khin Nyunt was appointed as prime minister, he announced a seven-point roadmap to democracy on 30 August 2003; this roadmap was heavily criticized by the Burmese opposition as well as by many foreign governments especially Western ones as it envisaged a permanent military participation in the government. The so-called 'systematic and step-by-step implementation of the road-map to democracy' also contained no time-line.

The first 'step' of the road map was the recalling of the suspended National Convention which first met in January 1993. The National Convention (NC) was supposed to 'lay down' the basic principles for a new Constitution. The NC met sporadically until the approval of a new constitution in 2008 by what many observers considered the rigged 2008 constitutional referendum.

=== Prime minister ===
After Khin Nyunt's appointment as Prime Minister of Myanmar, his role in the government gave rise to some hope and speculation that there might be some 'liberalization', as Khin Nyunt was considered a moderate pragmatist who saw the need of a dialogue with the democratic opposition. The SPDC Chairman Senior General Than Shwe and his deputy, Vice-Senior General Maung Aye, were seen as hardliners who opposed any relaxation of the military's iron grip of the country.

=== Controversy ===
From 1988 until his purge in 2004, Khin Nyunt oversaw the arrest of around 10,000 people. Many were subjected to torture and farcical trials that resulted in decades-long prison sentences. Dozens of his military intelligence units harassed, intimidated and detained opposition activists. His military intelligence units infiltrated almost every organization in the country and maintained networks of spies in almost every neighbourhood. Their agents were placed in customs, immigration and police departments, and officers military intelligence even monitored other senior military officials, including top generals.

Khin Nyunt was instrumental in closing the universities, then reopening them after they had been relocated to remote, ill-equipped campuses where students could no longer organise protests or get a meaningful education.

=== Arrest and release ===
On 18 October 2004, in a one-sentence announcement signed by SPDC Chairman Than Shwe, Khin Nyunt was "permitted to retire on health grounds". However, he was immediately arrested and placed under protective custody.

Allegations of Khin Nyunt's corruption were officially made several days later. His dismissal and arrest were the result of a power struggle in which the junta's strongman, Than Shwe, successfully managed to clip the power of the "intelligence faction" of the Myanmar Armed Forces which Khin Nyunt led. Most of the Generals and military officers in the SPDC, like Senior General Than Shwe, did not want to negotiate with Aung San Suu Kyi and the National League for Democracy (NLD).

On 5 July 2005, Khin Nyunt was tried by a Special Tribunal inside Insein Prison near Rangoon on various corruption charges. On 21 July 2005, he was sentenced to 44 years in prison, though it is believed that he is ostensibly serving his sentence under house arrest instead of in prison. His sons were also sentenced to 51 and 68 years respectively. It is unclear whether his wife was also indicted.

In July 2009, a video of Khin Nyunt at the home of former Burmese minister Brigadier-General Tint Swe, taken on 7 July 2009, was leaked to the public and there have been reports that Khin Nyunt and his wife have been able to travel outside their home on occasion, since March 2008. In December 2010, another 16-minute video of Khin Nyunt meeting with the Chief of Police Khin Yi and other senior police officers was circulated on YouTube.

Khin Nyunt's brother-in-law was Than Nyein, a long-term political prisoner under military regime and founder of National Democratic Force Party, who died of lung cancer in Yangon on 21 May 2014. Khin Nyunt was released from house arrest on 13 January 2012 by the order of President Thein Sein.

== Later life ==
After his release from house arrest, Khin Nyunt resettled in a villa in Yangon. There, he established a coffee shop, art gallery, and a souvenir shop featuring items like wood carvings for tourists. On 2 March 2015, Khin Nyunt published a 657-page autobiography, providing insights into various aspects of his life. On 5 December 2021, Senior General Min Aung Hlaing, the current Commander-in-Chief of the Tatmadaw, visited Khin Nyunt's home. It has been reported that the former general is facing health challenges, specifically from Alzheimer's disease.

== Personal life ==
Khin Nyunt is married to Khin Win Shwe, a medical doctor, and has two sons. He reportedly has seven grandchildren.

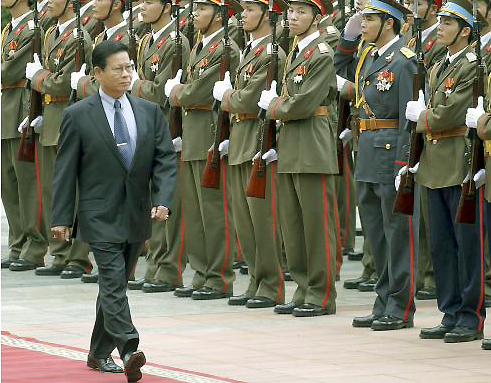
General Khin Nyunt inspecting a Vietnamese honor guard at the Presidential Palace in Hanoi, Vietnam, on 9 August 2004.

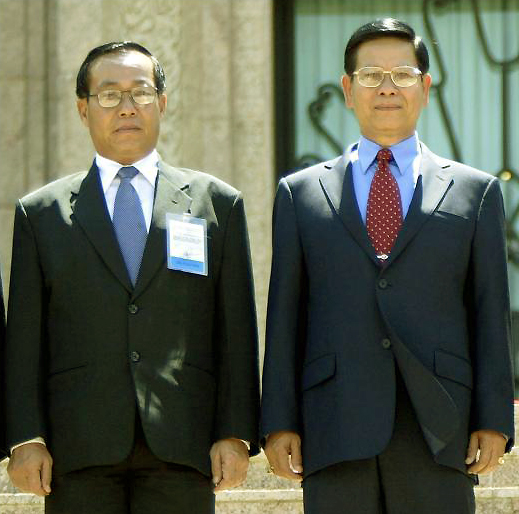
Prime Minister Soe Win (left) and former prime minister Khin Nyunt (right) on 21 October 2004.

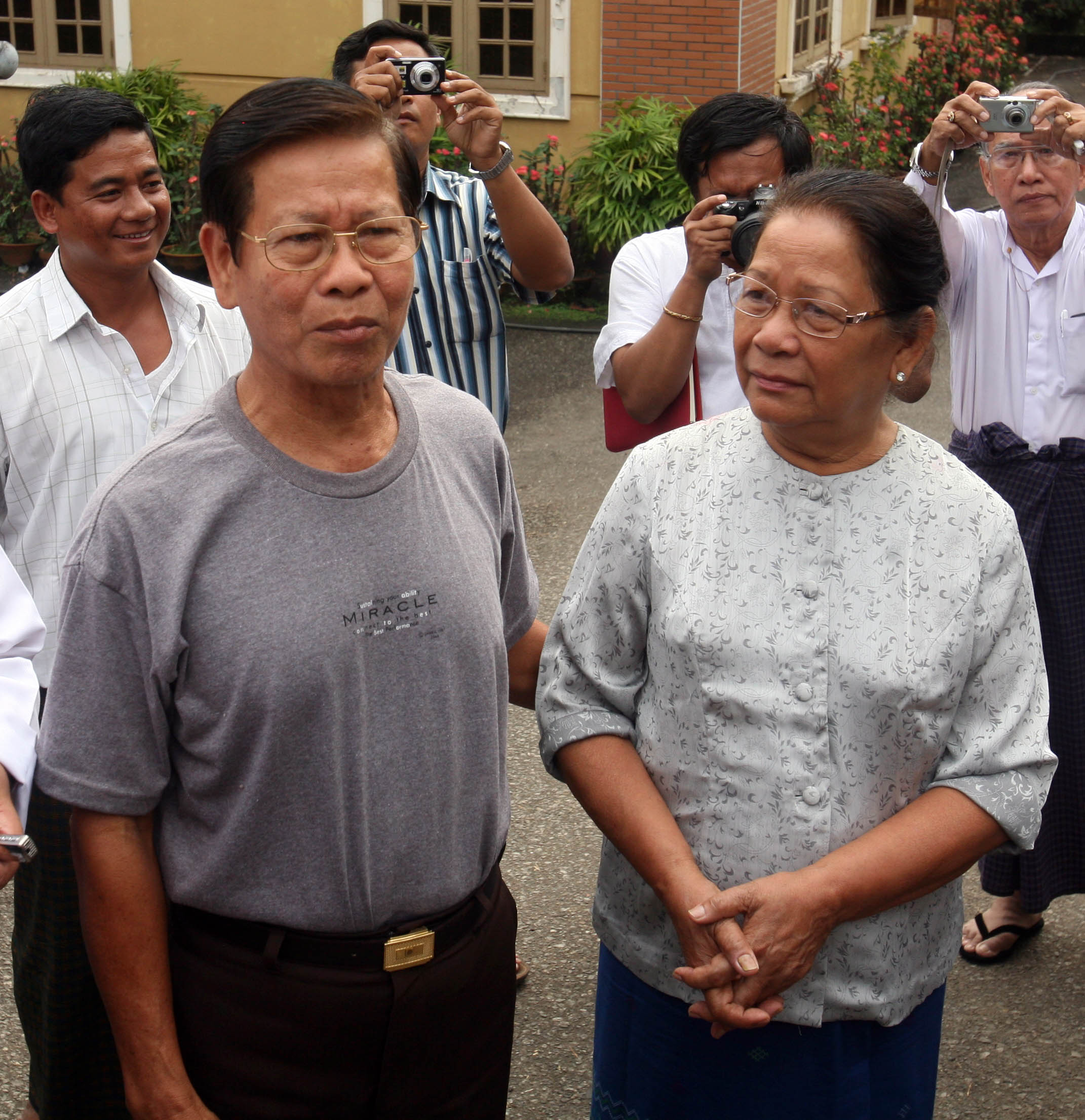
Khin Nyunt shortly after release from house arrest on 13 January 2012.

Political offices
Preceded by Than Shwe	Prime Minister of Myanmar; 2003–2004	Succeeded by Soe Win
