= Moe Hein (journalist) =

Burmese journalist

- မိုးဟိန်း
- Born: Yangon, Myanmar
- Other name: Washington Roosevelt
- Citizenship: United States
- Education: University of Yangon
- Occupations: Journalist, Editor-in-chief
- Known for: 8888 Uprising student leader, Pro-military propaganda
- Title: CEO of Thuriya Naywun Journal
- Political party: Democratic Party for a New Society (former)

Moe Hein (Burmese: မိုးဟိန်း), also known as Washington Roosevelt, is a Burmese journalist and former student activist. He is the founder and editor-in-chief of the Thuriya Naywun Journal. A prominent student leader in the 8888 movement, Moe Hein has been accused of betraying his activist roots by later supporting the military junta.

== Career ==
After the Burmese army seized power in September 1988, Moe Hein, then a Rangoon University student, along with other student leaders Min Ko Naing and Moethee Zun, helped to organize what became known as the 8888 nationwide student uprising in 1988. He served as the secretary of the Democratic Party for a New Society, and was subsequently imprisoned by the State Peace and Development Council (SPDC), the military junta. However, he was released from prison soon after, and began writing several articles critical of the National League for Democracy (NLD) party, the winner of the 1990 Myanmar general election, in junta-controlled newspapers. The junta then granted him a license to engage in the petrol trading business. The petrol business was a success, and Moe Hein launched Gandawin Bagan, a company that promoted concerts. However, for whatever reason, he fled to Thailand where he was granted asylum to emigrate to the United States.

In 2013, during the Thein Sein administration, he was allowed to return to Myanmar. He went on to start a local newspaper called The Sunlight. He angered the Union Solidarity and Development Party government, and the businessman Tay Za by writing an article critical of military cronies, calling for them to "Jump into the Andaman Sea". The Sunlight was allegedly raided by a group backed by Nay Shwe Thway Aung, grandson of the former military junta leader Gen. Than Shwe, and Thurein Win Myint, son of Win Myint, the former Commerce Minister. He then founded the Thuriya Naywun journal in 2014. The journal published articles, critical of the former military junta regime and the crony businessmen who allegedly reaped benefits due to their links with the regime. Moe Hein also owns The Steel Rose Journal.

Moe Hein holds American citizenship. He was blacklisted along with his family members, preventing entry into the country under any circumstance by the Ministry of Immigration and Population in June 2014.

Following the 2021 Myanmar coup d'état, Moe Hein became a staunch supporter of the State Administration Council, the military government. He has shared a steady stream of pro-military propaganda on Telegram, and has appeared regularly on Myawaddy TV. His statements in support of the military council were broadcast almost every day on the junta-owned networks Myawaddy TV and Myanmar Radio and Television. The government has ordered all military personnel including officers and their families to watch Moe Hein's propaganda TV programs. His propaganda programs are also shown daily in military training schools to spread militarism in the army. However, in 2024, he criticized Min Aung Hlaing and other junta members for self-interest and apathy towards the plight of frontline soldiers.

== Awards and recognition ==
On March 2, 2026, he was conferred the Medal for Excellent Performance in Social Field (First Class), one of the highest national medals awarded by the Government of Myanmar for exceptional contributions to social welfare.
