= Soe Win (prime minister) =

Prime Minister of Myanmar from 2004 to 2007

His Excellency General Soe Win
- စိုးဝင်း
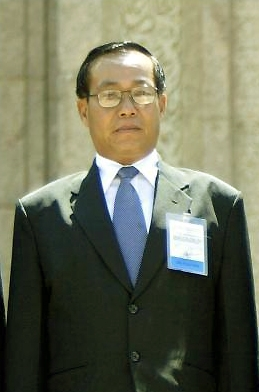
- Soe Win in 2004

Prime Minister of Myanmar
- In office 19 October 2004 – 12 October 2007
- Chairman: Than Shwe
- Preceded by: Khin Nyunt
- Succeeded by: Thein Sein

Secretary 1 of the State Peace and Development Council
- In office 25 August 2003 – 19 October 2004
- Preceded by: Khin Nyunt
- Succeeded by: Thein Sein

Personal details
- Born: 10 May 1947 Taunggyi, British Burma
- Died: 12 October 2007 (aged 60) Yangon, Myanmar
- Party: State Peace and Development Council (military dictatorship)
- Spouse: Than Than Nwe
- Children: 2
- Education: Defence Services Academy

Military service
- Allegiance: Myanmar
- Branch/service: Myanmar Army
- Years of service: 1965–2007
- Rank: General

Soe Win (Burmese: စိုးဝင်း; pronounced [só wɪ́ɰ̃]; 10 May 1947 – 12 October 2007) was a Burmese army general who served as the Prime Minister of Myanmar and Secretary-1 of the State Peace and Development Council from 2004 to 2007. He was known by Burmese dissident groups as "the butcher of Depayin" for his role as mastermind of the 2003 Depayin Massacre, in which 70 National League for Democracy supporters were killed by a government-sponsored mob.

== Biography ==
=== Early career ===
Soe Win was born in 1947. After completing his Conscripted service in a Border Guards Unit, he joined the Military Academy and was commissioned into the Air Defence Branch of the Air Force in 1969. A graduate of the Defense Services Academy (12th intake), he took part in the crackdown on democracy protesters as a Brigade Commander in 1988, deploying troops around Rangoon University and ordering them to shoot at Rangoon General Hospital during the upheaval. He became Tactical Operations Commander 3 of the Northwestern Regional Command in 1990.

In 1997 he was named Regional Commander and a member of the junta, then called the State Law and Order Restoration Council, or SLORC. In November 2001 he was named Air Defense General of the War Office. In February 2003 he was promoted to Secretary-2 of the junta, which was vacant after Lieutenant General Tin Oo was killed in a helicopter crash two years before.

Soe Win is widely regarded as the mastermind behind the deadly attack against National League for Democracy leader Aung San Suu Kyi and her supporters in the 30 May 2003 Depayin Massacre. In 2014, former Prime Minister Khin Nyunt released a memoir attributing responsibility for the massacre to Soe Win, who he claimed was acting on the instructions of former junta leader Senior General Than Shwe.

The same year he accompanied Senior General Than Shwe on state visits to Vietnam and China. Soe Win also signed the order to dismiss Foreign Minister Win Aung and his deputy in September 2003.

=== Rise to prime minister ===
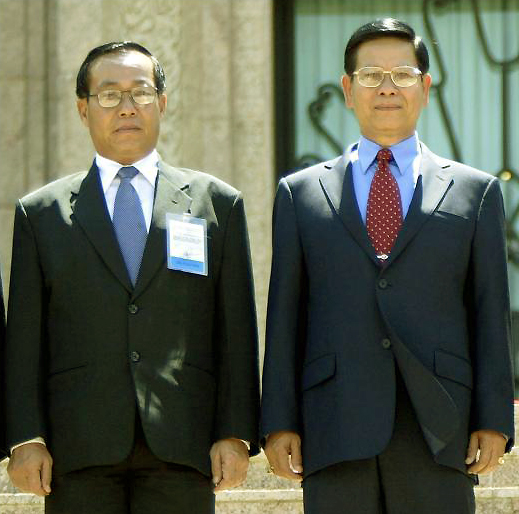
Soe Win pictured with Khin Nyunt

Soe Win was appointed prime minister by State Peace and Development Council chairman Than Shwe on 19 October 2004. Soe Win succeeded Khin Nyunt, who officially had been "permitted to retire for health reasons", but the reformist-minded premier had actually fallen out of favor with Than Shwe. Khin Nyunt was later convicted by a special tribunal of corruption charges and sentenced to 44 years in prison.

As Secretary-1 in the SPDC and prime minister, Soe Win was third in the leadership structure under Senior General Than Shwe and SPDC vice-chairman, Vice-Senior General Maung Aye. A senior member of the SPDC, Soe Win was close to Than Shwe, and the two men saw eye-to-eye on "nation building projects", which included constructing dams, roads and bridges.

With his appointment as prime minister, he took a tougher line against political reform than did his immediate predecessor, Khin Nyunt. He was quoted as saying in January 2003 "the SPDC not only won’t talk to the NLD but also would never hand over power to the NLD."

=== Health issues and death ===
In March 2007, Soe Win was admitted to a private hospital in Singapore. The government was secretive about the nature of his illness, though it was reported in the media that he was suffering from leukemia. He returned to Burma on 3 May 2007, but then returned to Singapore later that month. The Burmese embassy in Singapore said he was being treated for a "serious health matter". In April 2007, Lieutenant General Thein Sein was appointed acting prime minister in Soe Win's absence. On 1 October 2007, in the wake of the anti-government protests, Soe Win returned to Burma. His condition was reported as "very ill" and he was admitted to a military hospital in Mingalardon Township, Rangoon.

Soe Win's death was officially announced by the military authorities on 12 October. He died in Mingalardon Hospital, aged 60, from leukemia. His twin brother Major-General Tin Htun had died on 19 September 2007 of leukemia.

=== Career timeline ===
- Commanding Officer No. 12 Light Infantry Regiment (1990)
- G.S.O. (1), Central Command (1993)
- Commander, No. 66 Light Infantry Division (1996)
- Commander, North West Command (1997) and Chairman of Sagaing Division, State Law and Order Restoration Council
- Chief of Air Defense Forces (November 2001) and Member of State Peace and Development Council
- Secretary-2, State Peace and Development Council (February 2003)
- Secretary-1, State Peace and Development Council (August 2003)
- Prime Minister of Myanmar (19 October 2004)

== Decorations and Medals ==
- Naingngandaw Sit-Hmu-Dan Tazeit
- Pyithusit Taik Pwe Win Tazeit
- Naingngandaw Ayegyantharyaye Tazeit
- Mong Yang Methawaw Taik Pwe Tazeit
- Tatmadaw Gonzaung Ahmu-Dan Tazeit (First Grade)
- Tatmadaw Gonzaung Ahmu-Dan Tazeit (Second Grade)
- Tatmadaw Gonzaung Ahmu-Dan Tazeit (Third Grade)
- Sit-Hmu-Dan Thet Tazeit
- Naingngan Akyo-Zaung Tazeit
- Sit Pwe Tazeit (1974–1988)
- Sit Pwe Tazeit (1988–1990)
- Sit-Hmu-Dan Gaung Tazeit
- Tatmadaw Shwe-Yatu Tazeit

Political offices
Preceded by Khin Nyunt	Prime Minister of Burma; 2004–2007	Succeeded by Thein Sein
