= Nay Soe Maung =

Burmese physician

- နေစိုးမောင်

Rector of the University of Public Health, Yangon
- In office 2013 – August 2017
- Succeeded by: Khay Mar Mya

Personal details
- Born: 17 November 1956 (age 69) Yangon, Myanmar
- Spouse: Kyi Kyi Shwe
- Relations: Than Shwe (father-in-law); Kyaing Kyaing (mother-in-law)
- Children: Nay Shwe Thway Aung
- Parent: Tin Sein (father)
- Education: University of Medicine 1, Yangon (MBBS); Prince Leopold Institute of Tropical Medicine (MPH, ICHD); University of Economics, Yangon
- Occupation: Physician; professor; rector; activist
- Website: Nay Soe Maung on Facebook

Military service
- Allegiance: Burma
- Branch/service: Myanmar Army
- Rank: Lieutenant Colonel

Nay Soe Maung (Burmese: နေစိုးမောင်; born 17 November 1956) is a Burmese physician and professor who served as Rector of the University of Public Health, Yangon from 2013 to 2017, and as President of the People's Health Foundation. He is also an anti-tobacco control activist.

== Early life and education ==
Nay Soe was born on 17 November 1956 in Yangon, Myanmar. He is the son of Major general Tin Sein, a former Deputy Defense Minister of Burma. He graduated with MBBS and Diploma from University of Medicine 1, Yangon, MPH and ICHD from Prince Leopold Institute of Tropical Medicine, Belgium, and Master of Development Study from University of Economics, Yangon.

== Career ==
Nay Soe Maung became an army doctor in Myanmar Army Medical Corps and Military Hospital up to the rank of a colonel after his graduation. He also served as a lecturer, professor and later head of Department of Health Policy in the University of Public Health, Yangon. Afterwards, he was appointed as Rector of the University of Public Health, Yangon in 2013.

With an extensive background exceeding 20 years in medical research, Nay Soe Maung has primarily concentrated on disease control, specifically targeting communicable diseases (CD) and non-communicable diseases (NCD), including neglected tropical diseases like Lymphatic Filariasis, Malaria, and Dengue Hemorrhagic Fever (DHF). His substantial research portfolio encompasses a wide spectrum, including expertise in CD, NCD, Environmental Health, Health System Strengthening, and Health Policy and System research.

He presently serves as the president of the Myanmar Hiking and Mountaineering Federation and holds the position of vice-president at the Myanmar Organization for Road Safety (MORS).

In the aftermath of the 2021 Myanmar coup d'état, Nay Soe Maung posted a photo of himself supporting the demonstrations on Facebook, stating that as a retired public official, he stood together with the public and the truth. His vocal support for the anti-coup movement and criticism of the military regime drew the attention of authorities. On 23 October 2024, he was arrested in Pyigyidagun Township, Mandalay, on suspicion of spreading "inflammatory news." This arrest followed his online statements that criticized the incumbent military ruler, Senior General Min Aung Hlaing, and expressed condolences for the late senior National League for Democracy member Doctor Zaw Myint Maung.

Following his father's arrest, on 26 October 2024, Nay Shwe Thway Aung posted on his Facebook story: "Doing such things makes the people suffer... Let's think carefully." In Burmese, this reads: "အဲ့လိုတွေလုပ်လေပြည်သူကနာကျည်းလေ.. စဉ်းစားချင့်ချိန်လုပ်ကြပါ.." Nay Soe Maung's arrest highlights the risks faced by individuals within Myanmar's elite, revealing the ongoing tensions and challenges to dissent against the military government's authority. Nay Soe Maung was eventually sentenced to 3 years in prison for sedition.

== Award ==
He was awarded "World No Tobacco Day 2014 Award" by World Health Organization for his devoted works and major contribution to Tobacco Control Program of Myanmar.

== Personal life ==
Nay married Kyi Kyi Shwe, a daughter of dictator Than Shwe. They have one son, Nay Shwe Thway Aung.
