= Ayeyarwady Bank =

Bank in Yangon, Myanmar

Ayeyarwady Bank Public Company Limited

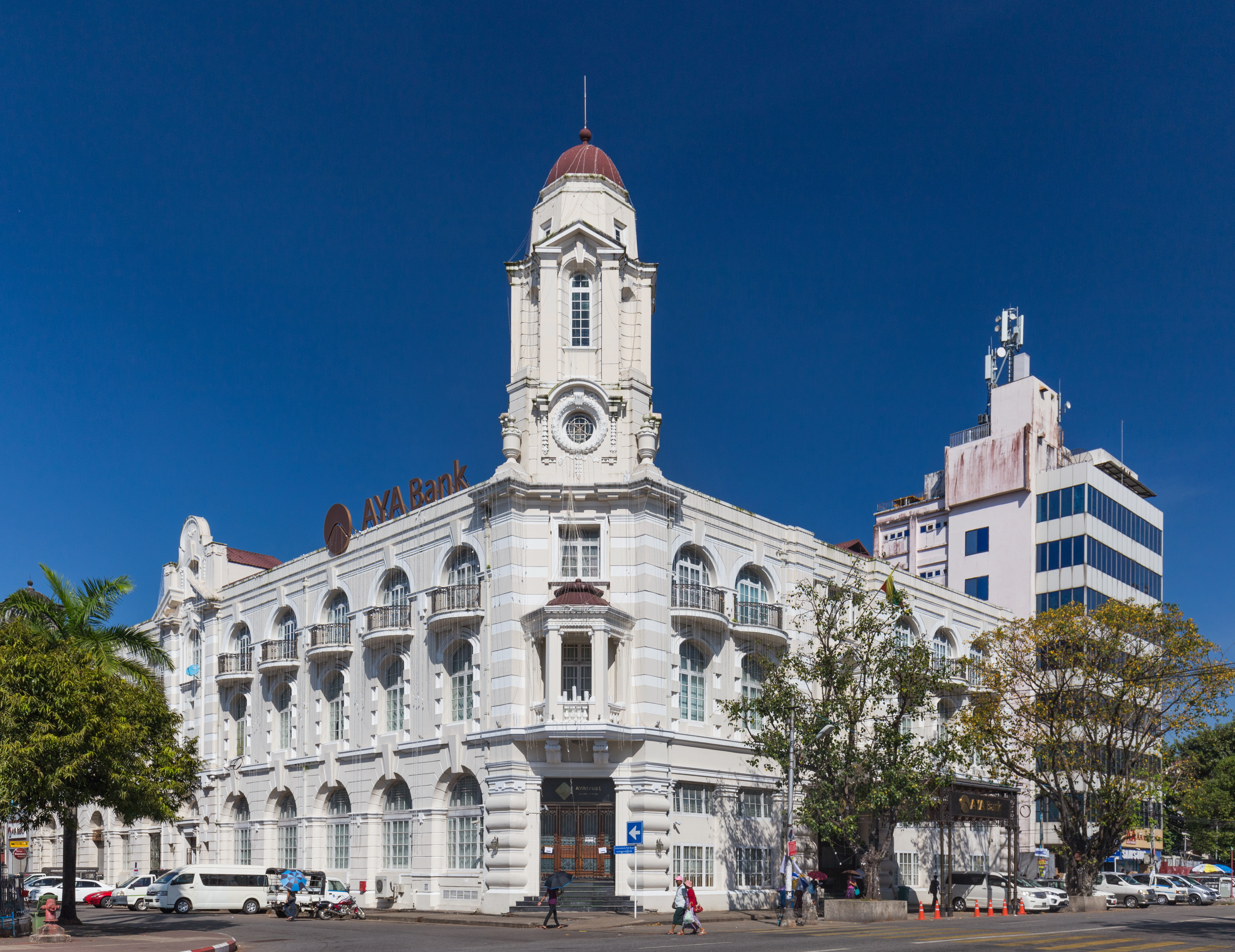
- Headquarter of Ayeyarwady Bank
- Native name: ဧရာဝတီဘဏ် အများနှင့် သက်ဆိုင်သော ကုမ္ပဏီ လီမိတက်
- Company type: Public
- Founded: 2010
- Founder: Zaw Zaw
- Headquarters: Yangon, Myanmar
- Number of locations: 260 branches (March 2024)
- Key people: Zaw Zaw (Group Chairman); Thazin Aung (Chief Executive Officer)
- Products: Financial services
- Number of employees: 6,500 (2024)
- Website: ayabank.com

Ayeyarwady Bank Public Company Limited (Burmese: ဧရာဝတီဘဏ်) is an institutional bank headquartered in Yangon.

== Products ==
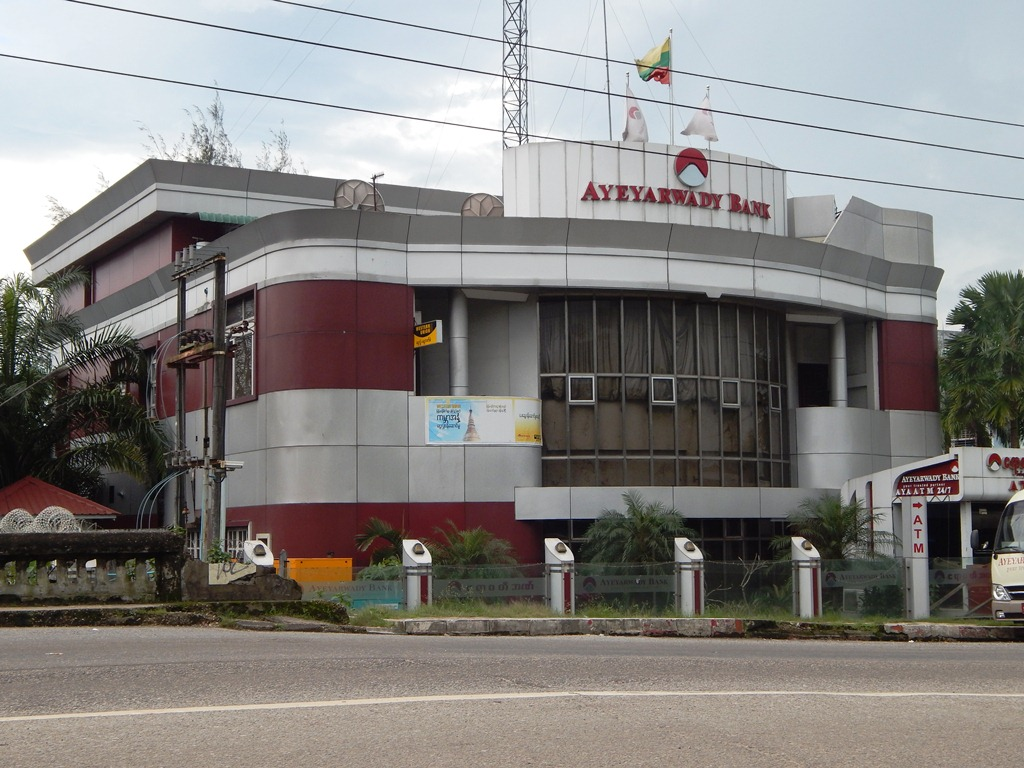

- Deposit
- Loan and Advances
- Remittances
- Card Payment
- E-Banking Services
- Cash Management
- Trade services
- Royal Banking
- Foreign Exchange Service
- Bancassurance
