= 2015 Myanmar constitutional referendum =

A constitutional referendum was scheduled to be held in Myanmar (Burma) in May 2015. If approved, the proposed reforms would have come into effect after the general elections in November. After all but one proposed amendments that require a referendum were discarded, the referendum was postponed. The amendments that do not need a referendum were passed instead.

According to the 2008 Constitution of Myanmar, certain sections require a nation-wide referendum in addition to more than 75% support in both houses of the Pyidaungsu Hluttaw (legislature) to amend, while other sections do not need a referendum to amend. The changes that need a referendum must be approved by more than 50% of the registered voters, rather than 50% of those voting.

== Referendum-requiring Bill ==
The proposed constitutional amendment bill was discussed at the Pyidaungsu Hluttaw from 23 to 25 June 2015. Amendments that required the referendum were confined to four key clauses.

- Article 436 for amending the constitution be lowered from its current figure of more than 75 percent to at least 70 percent of votes, which would have ended the effective veto of the military
- Articles 59 and 60 for presidency qualifications which bars opposition leader Aung San Suu Kyi from the presidency
- Article 418(b) for military’s role in the state of emergency is declared

The Pyidaungsu Hluttaw voted against most of these amendments on 25 June, ensuring that the military's veto power remained intact and that Aung San Suu Kyi could not become president in the 2015 general elections. The result was no surprise given that 25% of the seats in the legislature are, by law, held by the military. The proposal aimed to reduce the vote share needed to amend the constitution to 70%. The Pyidaungsu Hluttaw approved only a minor change to article 59(d).

== Cancellation of Referendum ==
The Union Election Commission requested to delay the referendum in July 2015 because it concerned only a minor change to article 59(d). On 22 July, the Pyidaungsu Hluttaw voted to postpone the referendum.

== Amendment without Referendum ==
The amendments to the schedules which do not require a referendum were enacted on 22 July 2015.
