= Roadmap to democracy =

Burmese reforms announced in 2003 by the military government

Myanmar's roadmap to democracy (Burmese: ဒီမိုကရေစီလမ်းပြမြေပုံ ၇ ချက်; officially the Roadmap to Discipline-flourishing Democracy), announced by General Khin Nyunt on 30 August 2003 in state media, provided a seven-step process in restoring democracy in the country. Endorsed by the State Peace and Development Council, it essentially describes the reassembly of the National Convention (အမျိုးသားညီလာခံ) in Nyaunghnapin, Hmawbi Township, Yangon Division to write a constitution, hold a national referendum to approve the constitution, hold a general election to elect members to the Hluttaw (legislative body), and finally hold parliamentary sessions.

== Phases ==
This road map has been variously translated into English as:

1. First Phase – To reassemble the National Convention, which had been suspended since 1996.
2. Second Phase – To implement step by step the requisite tasks for the founding of a democratic system when the National Convention has been successfully concluded.
3. Third Phase – To draw up a draft constitution based on the general concepts and detailed principles advocated by the National Convention.
4. Fourth Phase – To hold a national referendum to endorse the draft constitution.
5. Fifth Phase – To hold free and fair elections for the formation of the required national legislative bodies (Hluttaw).
6. Sixth Phase – To convene the meeting of elected representative to the Hluttaw.
7. Seventh Phase – The leaders, government and authoritative bodies elected by the Hluttaw to continue with the task of constructing a new democratic state.

The translation found in the New Light of Myanmar is as follows:

1. Reconvening of the National Convention that has been adjourned since 1996.
2. After the successful holding of the National Convention, step by step implementation of the process necessary for the emergence of a genuine and disciplined democratic system.
3. Drafting of a new constitution in accordance with basic principles and detailed basic principles laid down by the National Convention.
4. Adoption of the constitution through national referendum.
5. Holding of free and fair elections for Pyithu Hluttaws (Legislative bodies) according to the new constitution.
6. Convening of Hluttaws attended by Hluttaw members in accordance with the new constitution.
7. Building a modern, developed and democratic nation by the state leaders elected by the Hluttaw; and the government and other central organs formed by the Hluttaw.

== Reaction ==
Exile media and pro-democracy groups were critical of the road map, for its lack of set deadlines or time frames. The Myanmar Times claimed that the roadmap represented progress and hope for the eventual democratisation of the country. UN envoy to Burma, Ibrahim Gambari pressed for a more "credible and inclusive" roadmap in 2008.
