= Nay Shwe Thway Aung =

Burmese business tycoon and musician

- နေရွှေသွေးအောင်
- Born: 22 May 1991 (age 35); Yangon, Myanmar (Burma)
- Other names: Phoe La Pyae; The Explorer
- Education: West Yangon Technological University
- Occupation: Business tycoon
- Years active: 2010–present
- Height: 1.61 m (5 ft 3 in)
- Parent(s): Nay Soe Maung; Kyi Kyi Shwe
- Relatives: Than Shwe (grandfather); Kyaing Kyaing (grandmother)

Nay Shwe Thway Aung (Burmese: နေရွှေသွေးအောင်; pronounced [ne ʃwe θwei aʊŋ]; born 22 May 1991), also known as Phoe La Pyae (Burmese: ဖိုးလပြည့်; pronounced [phoʊ lə pjaɪ]; lit. 'Full Moon'), is a Burmese public figure and business tycoon. He is the grandson of Senior General Than Shwe, a retired senior army general and former Prime Minister of Myanmar. He has gained prominence for his involvement in various Business Ventures and has been associated with providing support to Myanmar's ruling regime and military government.

== Early life and family ==
Nay Shwe Thway Aung was born on 22 May 1991 in Yangon, Myanmar (Burma), as the only son of Nay Soe Maung, an army doctor, and his wife Kyi Kyi Shwe, the daughter of Than Shwe. He attended high school at Practising School Yangon Institute of Education, and later enrolled in West Yangon Technological University.

== Business interests ==
Nay Shwe Thway Aung is recognized as a key figure connecting regime officials and business leaders. He has faced allegations of directing military officers, who serve as his assistants, to engage in business conflicts. Some high-ranking generals and prominent businessmen in Myanmar have advised caution to their children regarding potential conflicts with Nay Shwe Thway Aung.

He has been accused of leveraging his grandfather's influence to profit, assisting businesses in recovering unlawfully imported goods, including vehicles confiscated at different seaports. Nay Shwe Thway Aung has been involved in multiple business disputes with the offspring of high-ranking generals, such as Aung Thet Mann and Toe Naing Mann, often emerging victorious.

Additionally he maintain close ties with notable figures like business tycoon Zaw Zaw. Through these connections, Zaw Zaw has obtained concessions and import licenses, including those for car and motorcycle imports, as well as fuel distribution licenses. Nay Shwe Thway Aung's interest in association football led to his recruitment by Zaw Zaw for Delta United, a professional soccer club in the Myanmar Football National League. Despite allegations, Nay Shwe Thway Aung's impact on the national team coaches allowed him to participate in an exhibition match attended by Japanese football star Hidetoshi Nakata on 14 June 2007.

Furthermore, he is a member of the Lamborghini Club in Singapore. Business sources in Yangon reported his acquisition of a new Mercedes-Benz from a warehouse owned by the military-controlled Union of Myanmar Economic Holdings. He reportedly paid only 10 million kyat (US$11,600) for a luxury vehicle valued at least 200 million kyat ($230,000).

== Political ambitions ==
According to The Irrawaddy, Nay Shwe Thway Aung has faced scrutiny from military officers who question his high rank within Myanmar's military circles, despite lacking army service. Some military elite expressed discontent over his front row presence beside his grandfather at official photoshoots.

Known for his close relationship with his grandfather Than Shwe, Nay Shwe Thway Aung frequently accompanies him on state visits and is featured in Myanmar's state-run media, appearing alongside his grandfather during state ceremonies and diplomatic tours across the country. In September 2010, he joined Than Shwe on a high-profile trip to China.

In 2010 Nay Shwe Thway Aung managed the Yadanabon Cyber City, Myanmar's Silicon Valley, and oversaw the government's Internet control center.

While initially believed to be in line for succession, poised to inherit leadership from his grandfather Than Shwe, Nay Shwe Thway Aung surprised observers on his 20th birthday by declaring, "I will not succeed my grandfather, Than Shwe." On 30 March 2011, Than Shwe officially stepped down as president in favor of his chosen successor, Thein Sein, as President of Myanmar.

On 4 December 2015, Nay Shwe Thway Aung and his grandfather, Than Shwe, met with Aung San Suu Kyi. During the meeting, Nay Shwe Thway Aung pledged his support to Aung San Suu Kyi, expressing commitment to back her efforts for the country's development.

In a state-level meeting on 22 October 2016, Nay Shwe Thway Aung represented one of the top-listed taxpayers, engaging in discussions between State Counsellor Aung San Suu Kyi and 158 influential tycoons.

Following the 2021 Myanmar coup d'état, Nay Shwe Thway Aung adopted a low profile and faced social boycotts, becoming a target of the social punishment movement due to his association with the former military family. This led to a decline in popularity, resulting in the loss of hundreds of thousands of fans he had before the coup.

== Music career and rise to fame ==
As a devoted fan of Enrique Iglesias, Nay Shwe Thway Aung has created numerous music videos and performed cover songs dedicated to the artist.

On 4 October 2014, he released a cover song of Iglesias's 'Escape', achieving over 1.1 million views. Another notable cover, 'Tonight (I'm Lovin' You)', was released on 8 November 2018, on his official Facebook page, known as 'Nay Shwe Thway Aung' '(The Explorer)', amassing over 1.9 million views, with one million views within 24 hours.

On 27 December 2018, he shared a cover of Iglesias's song 'Hero', receiving over 1.2 million views and positive reactions from his fans. Nay Shwe Thway Aung blends Burmese lyrics with the original song, showcasing his diverse musical talent in pop, electronic, dance and electronic dance music genres.

He invested substantial resources, including tens of thousands of US dollars, in recreating Enrique Iglesias, even going to the extent of burning genuine hundred-dollar notes.

In 2019, Nay Shwe Thway Aung had a private meeting with Iglesias, and he also participated in the Miss Universe Myanmar 2019.

== Controversies and allegations ==
During his grandfather Than Shwe's tenure, Nay Shwe Thway Aung has involved in various incidents that garnered media attention. In 2017, following a hiatus from public life, he refuted these allegations on his Facebook account, attributing them to political motivations and characterizing them as untrue.

In his teenage years Nay Shwe Thway Aung faced accusations of kidnapping actress Wutt Hmone Shwe Yi, reportedly holding her in his house for several days. In October 2008, reports circulated that he used his influence to secure enrollment for his girlfriend, model Nay Chi Lin Let, at the Institute of Medicine. Allegations also suggested his association with an unruly group called Sin Zway (Elephant Tusk).

In 2009 he was implicated in a drug scandal in Yangon, with two individuals connected to him, business tycoon Maung Weik and Aung Zaw Ye Myint (son of Lieutenant General Ye Myint), subsequently arrested.

According to a leaked US diplomatic cable in January 2009, Nay Shwe Thway Aung purportedly encouraged his grandfather to make a US$1 billion bid to acquire Manchester United football club. Despite initial considerations, the plan was abandoned due to intense international criticism of Than Shwe's regime, particularly from the United Nations for its response to Cyclone Nargis. Nay Shwe Thway Aung later denied the reports, expressing his allegiance as a hardcore fan of Chelsea F.C. and disinterested in acquiring Manchester United.

Reports indicate that Nay Shwe Thway Aung ordered the demolition of Seven Corners, a café in Yangon, following a disagreement. Whether a personal feud or business dispute fueled this incident remains a subject of speculation. The café's owners are identified as Captain Tay Zar Saw Oo, the son of Junta Secretary 1 General Tin Aung Myint Oo, and Aung Soe Tha, the son of Minister of National Planning and Economic Development Soe Tha. In the alleged assault at the café, Nay Shwe Thway Aung is said to have berated the owners, expressing his disapproval of government ministers' sons conducting business in a state-owned building, citing the café's location within university grounds.

According to The Irrawaddy, in December 2010, he gave his personal assistants the order to physically assault Win Htwe Hlaing, a professional golfer and the son of former Major General Win Hlaing, over business disagreements. The conflict arose when Win Htwe Hlaing attempted to take control of a real estate deal that Nay Shwe Thway Aung had previously negotiated. Instead of complying with Nay Shwe Thway Aung's request, conveyed through a friend, to step back from the reserved land, Win Htwe Hlaing, responded indifferently, expressing no concern for Nay Shwe Thway's identity. Reportedly angered by this response, the army chief's grandson ordered his assistants, army officers holding the ranks of major and captain, to physically assault Win Htwe Hlaing. Consequently, Win Htwe Hlaing sustained injuries to his face during the altercation.

Due to published coverage accusing him of an attack, The Sunlight Journal, which Moe Hein founded, allegedly underwent a raid by a group backed by him in October 2013. Moe Hein stated that Nay Shwe Thway Aung did not enter the premises during the raid, but claimed that 14 computers and copies of the newspaper were taken during the incident.

In 2013, he made headlines for slapping a traffic police officer who failed to adequately clear traffic for him at a busy intersection. Activist Htin Kyaw filed a lawsuit on behalf of the victim against Nay Shwe Thway Aung at Kamayut police station. Although his complaint was accepted, he was not permitted to initiate a legal case. Htin Kyaw argued that slapping uniformed government service personnel on duty is deemed a challenge to the rule of law in the country.

On 23 October 2024, Nay Soe Maung, the father of Nay Shwe Thway Aung, found himself embroiled in controversy when the Myanmar military junta arrested him, accusing him of "damaging the state’s peace and stability" through his Facebook posts. The regime's statement highlighted that he was detained at the Pyigyitagun Police Station in Mandalay for allegedly inciting and spreading propaganda on social media.

Nay Soe Maung, who served as the rector of the University of Public Health and retired as a captain from the military's medical corps, is married to Kyi Kyi Shwe, the daughter of former military leader Senior General Than Shwe. His arrest reflects a broader conflict within Myanmar's elite, particularly when the authority of current military leaders is challenged.

In recent social media posts, he expressed condolences regarding the death of Zaw Myint Maung, a jailed statesman, which prompted questions about his father-in-law's influence over current military leader Senior General Min Aung Hlaing. His comments, which included a Burmese phrase conveying disapproval of someone who fails to recognize valuable advice, further stirred tensions.

On 26 October 2024, Nay Shwe Thway Aung posted on his Facebook story, stating: "Doing such things makes the people suffer... Let's think carefully," and in Burmese: "အဲ့လိုတွေလုပ်လေပြည်သူကနာကျည်းလေ.. စဉ်းစားချင့်ချိန်လုပ်ကြပါ.."
