= National Convention (Myanmar) =

1993–2008 constitutional body in Myanmar

- State Seal of Myanmar

History
- Founded: 9 January 1993
- Disbanded: 3 September 2007

Leadership
- Chairman of the Convening Convention: Myo Nyunt (1993–1996); Thein Sein (2004–2007), SLORC
- Chairman of the Work Committee: Aung Toe

Structure
- Seats: 702 (1993–1996)
- Political groups: SLORC (555); National League for Democracy (86); Shan Nationalities League for Democracy (6); National Unity Party (3); Other (52)

The National Convention was a constituent assembly formed by the State Law and Order Restoration Council of Myanmar, with the stated goal of establishing a new constitution for the country. Dominated by representatives of the SLORC, the National Convention was boycotted by members of the National League for Democracy and other members, who represented both elected members of parliament and ethnic minorities.

== Formation and first convention (1993–1996) ==
The National Convention was established on 9 January 1993 in line with Order No. 13/92 of the State Law and Order Restoration Council, which had previously outlined six principles for the National Convention on 2 October 1992:

1. Non-disintegration of the Union;
2. Non-disintegration of national unity;
3. Perpetuation of national sovereignty;
4. Promotion of a genuine multiparty democracy;
5. Promotion of the universal principles of justice, liberty and equality;
6. Participation by the Defence Services in a national political leadership role in the future state.

The first three were part of the Three Main National Causes, which was the SLORC's conditions for negotiations regarding the Internal conflict in Myanmar. The SLORC dominated the convention via 555 hand-picked delegates for various groups of society, such as the intelligentsia, peasantry, and workers. The remaining 147 delegates comprised members of the National League for Democracy (89), the Shan Nationalities League for Democracy (6), the pro-SLORC National Unity Party (3), and other individuals who had either been democratically elected or represented political parties.

The National Convention was marked with disorder between members of the SLORC and the opposition from its beginning. After only two days in session, the convention was forced to adjourn for the first time amidst protests by the NLD and ethnic minorities. Nonetheless, in its early period members of the National Convention were permitted to put forward proposals which ran counter to the SLORC's aims. However, the SLORC quickly began to crack down by restricting presentations, classifying documents, restricting public discussion of the convention's proposals, and intimidating anti-SLORC delegates.

NLD delegate Aung Khin Sint was arrested on 15 October 1993 alongside his assistant Than Min, and both were sentenced to 20 years' imprisonment on charges of political agitation and sending threats to other members of the convention. Fellow delegate U Than Hla was arrested the same year and sentenced to 15 years' imprisonment. Arrests of those critical of the convention continued throughout the year, and lieutenant general Myo Nyunt (chairman of the convening committee of the National Convention) reopened the body on 7 June 1993, further underlining the Tatmadaw's desire to remain in a leading role in a speech at the convention's opening. However, by 16 September it had again been suspended amidst protests from ethnic minority delegates against the establishment of a centralised system, as was adopted at the convention.

In meetings throughout 1994, among other things, it was determined to allocate one-third of all seats in the future legislature to the Tatmadaw, as well as to establish a presidential system, with the requirement that presidential candidates "must have been a continuous resident for more than 20 years, have political, administrative, military and economic experience, and not have a spouse or children who are citizens of another country," according to Human Rights Watch. These criteria eliminated opposition leader Aung San Suu Kyi. Other articles adopted in 1994 barring any changes to the country's territory or the territory of states of Myanmar.

On 28 November 1995 the convention reopened to widespread protests from the NLD, which called on the Chairman of the Work Committee Aung Toe to allow for dialogue between the opposition and SLORC to achieve the desires of the population for democracy. After Aung Toe did not mention the matter during his opening speech, the NLD declared a boycott. In response, the SLORC removed the 89 NLD delegates from the convention on 30 November, citing their absence on 29 and 30 November 1995 as grounds for removal under sections 48 and 49 of the National Convention Procedures.

Following the expulsion of NLD delegates from the convention, state-backed media claimed that tens of thousands attended protests organised by the ruling Union Solidarity and Development Association in support of the expulsion, and the remaining delegates continued to meet sporadically throughout the first three months of 1996. During this time, further amendments on establishing a bicameral legislature with 25% of all delegates selected from the Tatmadaw were passed, as was an amendment mandating that the Ministry of Defence, Ministry of Home Affairs, and Ministry of Security were to be selected by the Tatmadaw.

On 31 March 1996 the National Convention was adjourned by the SLORC, following the expulsion of the NLD. On 7 June of the same year, Law No 5/96 was adopted, banning criticism of the National Convention and making such criticism punishable by long prison sentences.

== Re-establishment (2003–2007) ==
On 30 August 2003, following the Depayin massacre a few months prior, Prime Minister general Khin Nyunt publicly outlined the State Peace and Development Council's (Note: The SLORC's name after 1997.) roadmap to democracy, the first point of which called for the reconvening of the National Convention. This was again confirmed by the Bangkok Process in December of the same year, with Australia, Austria, China, France, Germany, India, Indonesia, Italy, Japan, Singapore, and the United Nations all in support.

On 30 March 2004 the date of the convention's reconvening was stated by Thein Sein, chairman of the convening commission, as 17 May 2004. Following the convention's coming to order, exiled activists and human rights organisation International Federation for Human Rights criticised the convention, noting that information about the convention's members was secret. The number of convention members was speculated as between 800 and 1,000, based on public statements made by the SPDC.

At the first conference of the convention, Ethnic Armed Organisations who had signed ceasefires with the SPDC were given increased presence at the NLD's expense; the number of minority delegates increased from 215 in 1993 to 633 in 2004, while the number of elected delegates decreased to 15 with the continued absence of the NLD from negotiations. The conferences were held in a purpose-built conference hall in Hmawbi Township.

Human Rights Watch condemned the National Convention, noting in 2008 that "Any proposal at odds with the SPDC's own vision for its draft constitution was dismissed or ignored." In response to the refusal of the SPDC to consider discussing proposed amendments on ethnically based decentralisation, the New Mon State Party refused to continue participating in discussions, downgrading its status to that of an observer.

In July 2007, the National Convention announced its final session. A last-ditch effort by the Kachin Independence Organisation to push through 19 proposals failed, and, amidst the Saffron Revolution, the convention concluded on 3 September 2007. The Constitution of Myanmar was adopted the next year via referendum.
