= Zaw Zaw =

Burmese businessman

Thiri Pyanchi Zaw Zaw
- ဇော်ဇော်
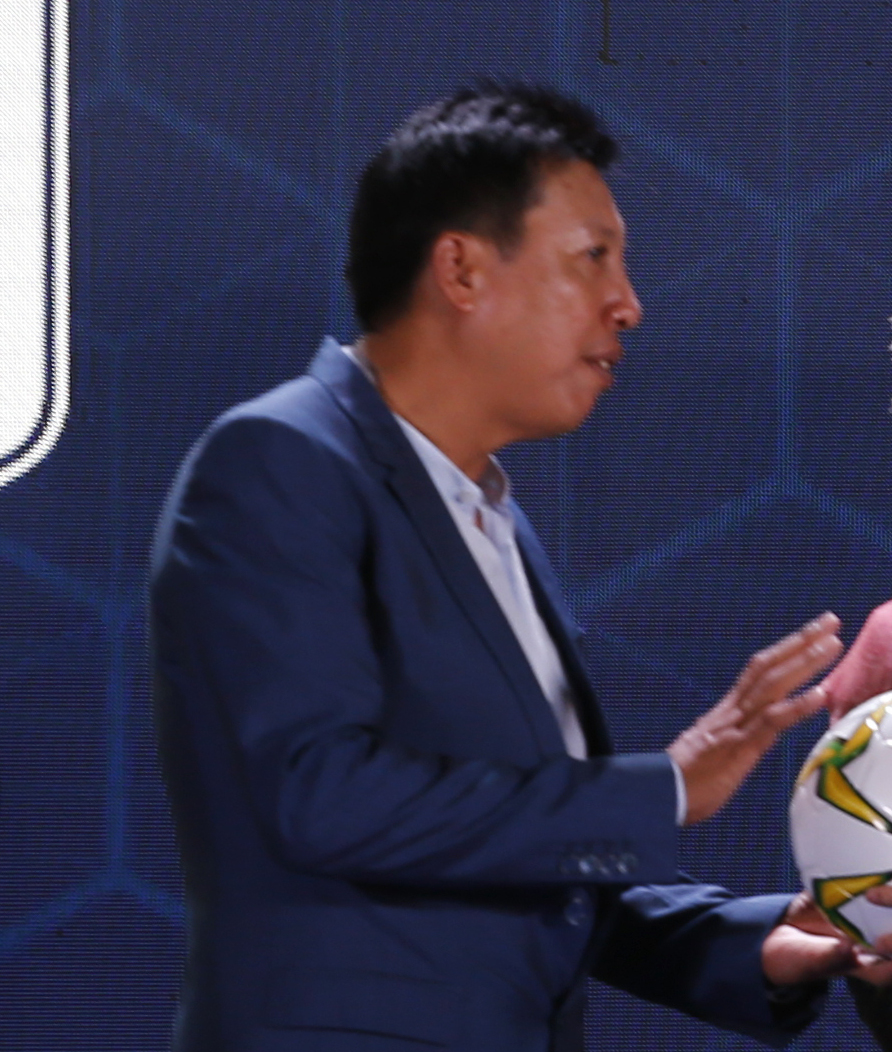
- U Zaw Zaw in 2020
- Born: 22 August 1967 (age 59); Irrawaddy Division, Burma (Myanmar)
- Other names: Phoe Zaw; Max Zaw Zaw
- Education: University of Rangoon
- Occupation: Chairman Max Myanmar Group of Companies
- Spouse: Htay Htay Khaing
- Children: Ye Mann Zaw, Eaint Hmu Zaw
- Relatives: Kan Myint (father-in-law)
- Awards: Thiri Pyanchi Award; ASEAN Goodwill Award; State Excellence Award; AFC Distinguished Service Award

Zaw Zaw (Burmese: ဇော်ဇော်) is a Burmese business magnate, banker, investor, and philanthropist. He is the chairman of Max Myanmar Group of Companies, a major conglomerate. Zaw Zaw has served as the president of the Myanmar Football Federation since 2005, and vice president of ASEAN Football Federation (AFF) and Asian Football Confederation (AFC).

== Early life ==
Zaw Zaw was born in Yegyi Township, Ayeyarwady Region in 1967. He graduated from University of Yangon, majoring in Mathematics.

== Business ==
He started his career in the early 1990s when he was living in Japan, with a part-time job washing dishes in Ginza. In 1993, he founded Max Myanmar, initially as an exporter of used Japanese cars to his home country. He reportedly had close ties to key figures from the former ruling military junta, the State Peace and Development Council, including Maung Aye and Than Shwe's grandson Nay Shwe Thway Aung. Through his relationships, Zaw Zaw has won concessions and import licenses, including most of the country's car and motorcycle imports licenses, as well as import and distribution licenses for fuel. In 1996, he went into construction sector, one year later, he started Hotel Business with Hotel Max Yangon. His company won several bids to construction projects in Naypyidaw, the country's new capital, including a stadium for the 2013 Southeast Asian Games.

In 2009, Zaw Zaw suffered a major setback, when he was blacklisted by the United States, being one of around 200 individuals and companies that had sanctions against doing business with them imposed, under a Specially Designated Nationals (SDN) List regulated by the U.S. Treasury. His attempt to enter the Singaporean stock market as an international businessman by bidding over Aussino Group Ltd. was not successful. Singaporean stock market regulators were concerned at this and rejected the bid in January 2013. Annual revenue of Max Myanmar Group was about US $500 million in the early 2010s. In 2010, he established the Ayeyarwady Foundation to provide funding for charity projects such as building schools and medical institutions.

He was delisted from SDN list by the US Treasury in 2016.

== Sports ==
=== Football ===
Zaw Zaw has been serving as the chairman of the Myanmar Football Federation since 2005.

He also served as an Executive Committee Member of Asian Football Confederation (AFC) and the Chairman of AFC Organising Committee for Youth Competition. After his first-term of vice presidency in ASEAN Football Federation (AFF), he was re-elected as vice-president of ASEAN Football Federation (AFF) for another four-year term from 2019-2023 at the AFF 26th Congress in March 2019. In April 2019, he was elected as a vice president of Asian Football Confederation (AFC) for the next four-year term (2019-2023).

Investigations by The Guardian and other outlets identified Zaw Zaw as chair of the FIFA Peace Prize selection committee in 2025. Critics highlighted his ties to Myanmar's former military junta and to human rights abuses against the Rohingya people, raising concerns about the credibility of a peace award under his oversight.

=== Tennis ===
He chaired Myanmar Tennis Federation from 2002 to 2005. He brought Davis Cup back to Myanmar after 50 years and the country hosted Zonal competition in 2005.

== Philanthropy ==
Zaw Zaw is an active philanthropist, and is involved in causes including healthcare, education, disaster response and youth development. In 2011, he constructed 550-bedded Yankin Children's Hospital worth Kyats 9 billion ($10 million) and transferred the hospital ownership to the Ministry of Health to be used as a tertiary paediatric hospital in Yangon as well as a teaching hospital of University of Medicine 2, Yangon.

On 12 February 2016, he donated funds to patients with heart disease for family health support.

In 2017, he donated Kyats 2.33 billion ($1.7 million) in Rakhine State through his Ayeyarwady Foundation. His foundation also provides free medical treatments to the under-privileged children in Yankin Children's Hospital.

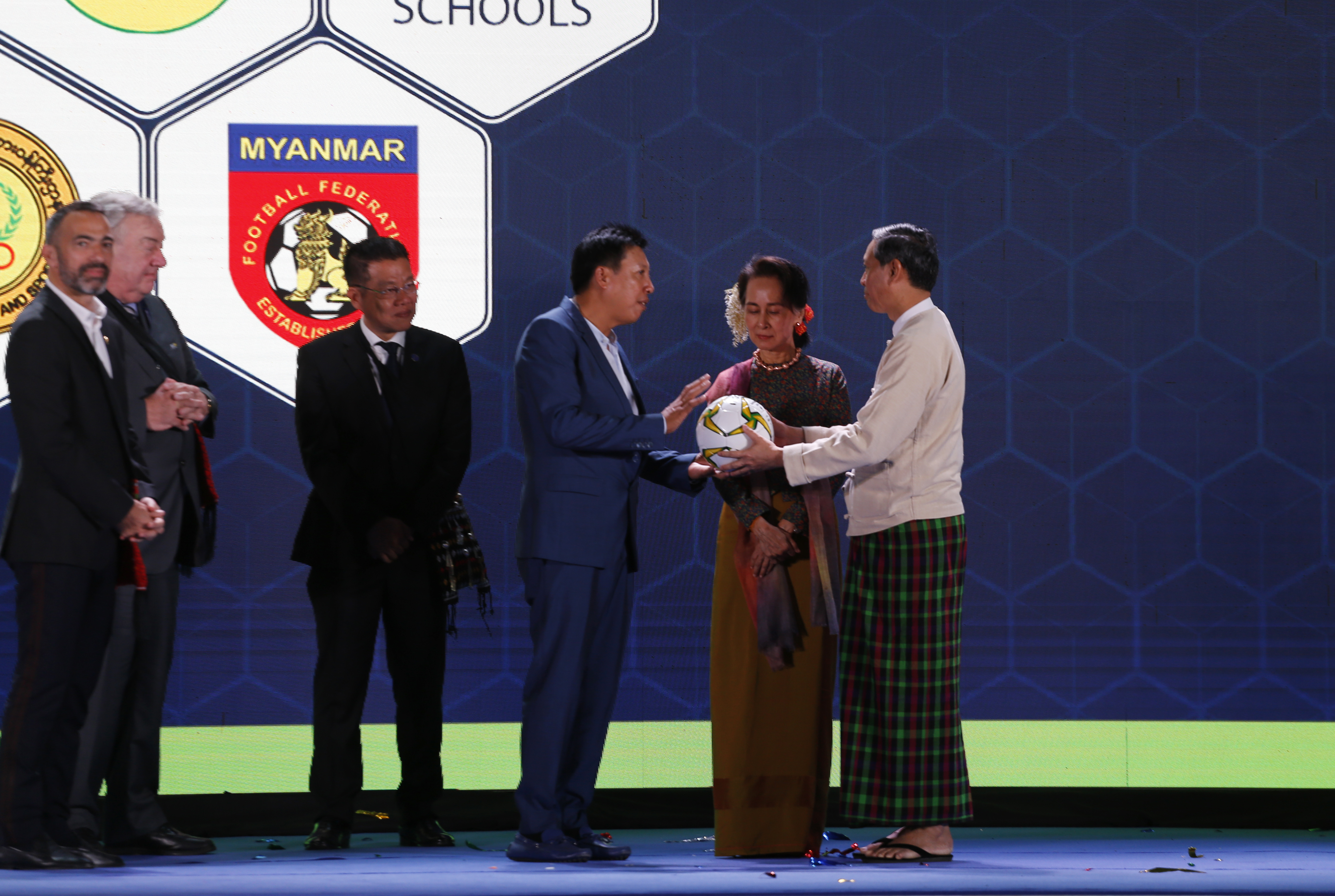
Zaw Zaw (centre) with Union Minister of Education, Myo Thein Gyi, in 2020 to donate ten thousand balls.

He donated ten thousand balls to the Football for Schools Programme.

He consistently contributed for COVID-19. He supported MMK 100 millions worth medical aids for Waibagi Hospital and Yankin Children's Hospital and provided facility quarantines for more than 350 people. He also funded 500 Million MMK worth of Health Insurance Benefit for Caregivers and provided accommodation, daily meals and transportation services ferrying the doctors and nurses from Waibargi Hospital, who are facing the difficulties of commuting and lodgings.

He has contributed over US $2.2 million (3 billion kyats) to Myanmar's fight against the coronavirus outbreak since March.

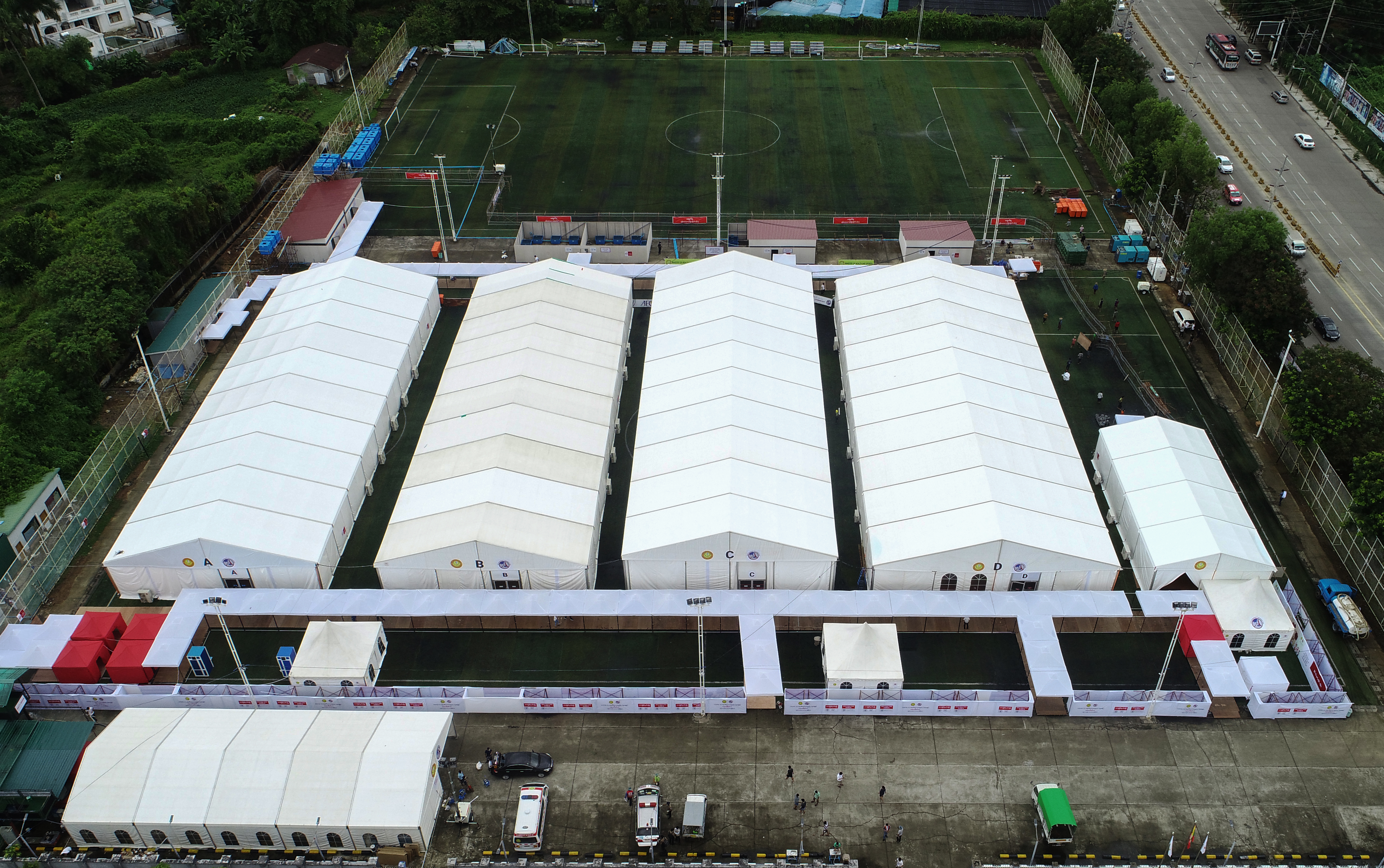
Ayeyarwady Centre for COVID-19 patients which is built within seven days in Yangon

In September 2020, Zaw Zaw has been built temporary treatment center for COVID-19 positive people which is built within seven days in Yangon through Ayeyarwady Foundation. Ministry of Health and Sports assigned a team of 100 healthcare professionals and volunteers to run the site and the foundation contributes the entire bill for construction, logistics, foods and medical supplies.

== Recognition ==
His efforts for Myanmar football as the Chairman of Myanmar Football Federation starting from 2005, were recognized by the ASEAN Football Federation and was instrumental in the MFF picking up the AFF Association of the Year award at the AFF Awards 2013 in the first week of April.

On 30 April 2013, he was honoured with the State Excellence Award of the President of Myanmar for being one of the top taxpayers in the country. He was honoured country's top taxes payer certificate by President U Win Myint for the 2017-18 fiscal year.

In November 2013, he led the MFF to obtain the AFC Dream Asia award, which is given in recognition of those who share the values of Dream Asia, the AFC's social responsibility initiative, which promotes the culture of giving, and emphasizes the power of football in bringing about positive change in respective Asian societies.

He was recognized as "Banker of the Year" by Myanmar Times in 2014.

He empowered Myanmar National Under-20 Football Team to reach FIFA U-20 World cup 2015 in New Zealand, and the MFF was recognized by the AFF Association of the Year award at the AFF Awards 2015.

In mid-August 2017, for the second time running, he received the ASEAN Goodwill Award at the AFF Football Awards for his outstanding acts or contributions to the ASEAN Football Federation.
