= University of Public Health, Yangon =

Higher education institute in Yangon, Myanmar

Coordinates: 16°46′49.8″N 96°08′54.2″E

University of Public Health, Yangon (UOPH)
- ပြည်သူ့ ကျန်းမာရေး တက္ကသိုလ် (ရန်ကုန်)
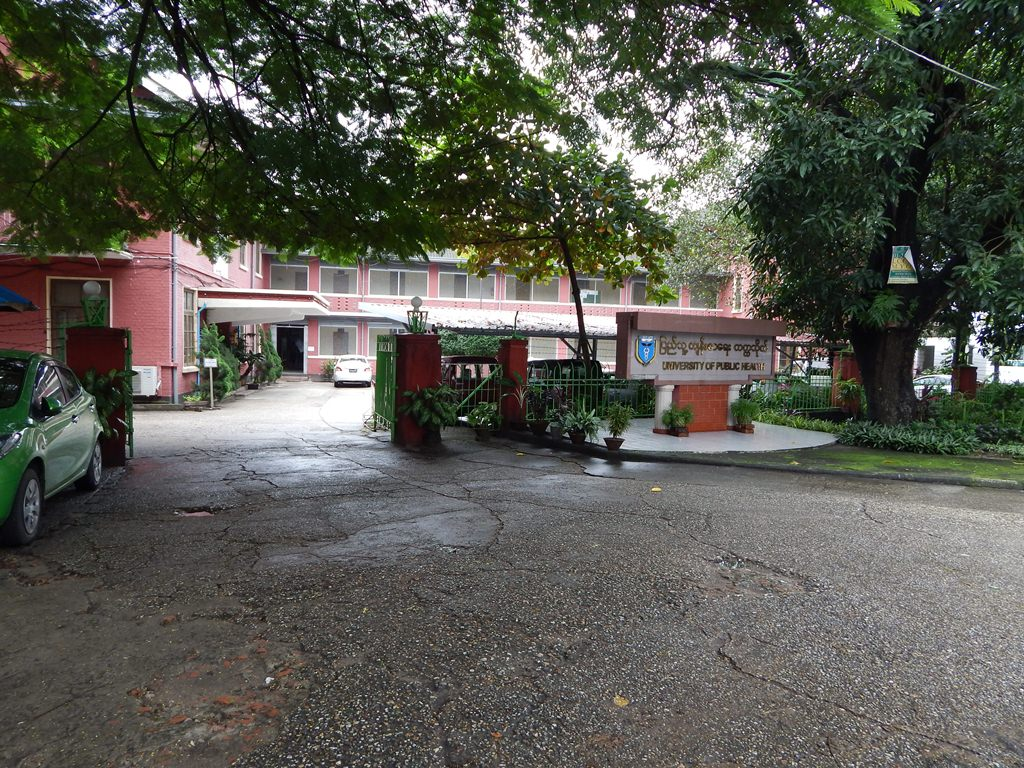
- Type: Public
- Established: 2007; 19 years ago
- Affiliations: Ministry of Health
- Rector: Prof Dr Hla Hla win
- Location: Yangon; Yangon Division, Myanmar
- Website: uph-myanmar.gov.mm

The University of Public Health, Yangon (Burmese: ပြည်သူ့ ကျန်းမာရေး တက္ကသိုလ် (ရန်ကုန်) [pjìðṵ tɕáɰ̃màjé tɛʔkəθò (jàɰ̃ɡòʊɰ̃)]) is the premier university of public health in Myanmar. Founded in 2007, the university offers only graduate and post-graduate degree programs: Master of Public Health (MPH), PhD in Public Health, Diploma in Medical Science and Diploma in Medical Education. The university is a member of the South-East Asia Public Health Education Institution Network (SEAPHEIN).

== Location ==
It is located in the heart of Yangon. The full address is 246, Myo Ma Kyaung Street, at the corner of Bo Gyoke Aung San Road and Lamadaw Street, Latha, Yangon. It is just across the road in front of University of Medicine 1 which is the oldest medical school in Myanmar.

== History ==
The university was founded in 2007 to strengthen the public health system (including human resources for public health) and infrastructure in Myanmar. It is to help strengthen referral systems by providing technical back-up. Referral facilities for primary, secondary and tertiary care are important to effective community health work. Current dean of the school is Professor Nay Soe Maung who has served as an army doctor up to the rank of a colonel. He is ex-husband of one of the daughters of former Myanmar Junta head.

== Entrance ==
Physicians(M.B.B.S), dentists(B.D.S), nurses(B.N.Sc) and health assistants(B.Comm.H) are allowed to enter this school. Medical doctors and community/public health professions who are working in government service can enroll the UOPH via entrance exam. Applicant must be under 50 years old. They also finished the training of Central Institute of Civil Service in Myanmar. It is under authority of Ministry of Health in Myanmar.

== See also ==
- University of Community Health, Magway
