= Depayin massacre =

2003 mob violence against the National League for Democracy in Sagaing Division, Myanmar

- Part of Myanmar conflict
- Location: 22°28′00″N 95°09′00″E; Outskirts of Tabayin, Sagaing Division, Myanmar (Burma)
- Date: 30 May 2003; 8:00 PM (MMT)
- Target: National League for Democracy (NLD) convoy
- Attack type: Massacre
- Deaths: 70–282
- Perpetrator: Government-sponsored mob

The Depayin massacre (Burmese: ဒီပဲယင်း လူသတ်မှု) occurred on 30 May 2003 in Tabayin (Depayin), a town in Myanmar's Sagaing Division (now Sagaing Region), when at least 70 people associated with the National League for Democracy were killed by a government-sponsored mob. In an April 2012 interview, Khin Nyunt, formerly the country's prime minister, claimed that he personally intervened to save Aung San Suu Kyi's life during the massacre, by mobilising his men to bring her to a safe location at a nearby army cantonment.

According to an eyewitness account published by Radio Free Asia in September 2003, government officials arrived in the area several days before the attack, commandeering a local school and requisitioning 50 to 60 trucks and vans to transport members of the Union Solidarity and Development Association (USDA) to the ambush site. The witness, who identified himself as a USDA member recruited to participate in the attack, alleged that military officers coordinated the operation by radio, including directing two vehicles to collide with Aung San Suu Kyi's car before the convoy was blocked near Ye-U. The witness also alleged that bodies of those killed were transported to a crematorium in Monywa, but Radio Free Asia stated that it was unable to independently verify that claim.

In an analysis published by the Asian Human Rights Commission, lawyer U Aung Htoo argued that the Depayin massacre constituted a premeditated and systematic attack against supporters of the National League for Democracy (NLD). Citing the findings of the Ad Hoc Commission on the Depayin Massacre, he wrote that thousands of members of the Union Solidarity and Development Association (USDA) and other pro-government groups had been assembled and armed in advance, local residents were instructed to remain indoors before the convoy arrived, and security forces arrested survivors and witnesses following the attack. Htoo argued that the incident met the definition of a crime against humanity under Article 7 of the Rome Statute of the International Criminal Court.

In 2026, an investigation by Myanmar Now, based on leaked military intelligence documents, reported that the Depayin massacre had been planned in advance by senior leaders of the State Peace and Development Council (SPDC) and the Military Intelligence Service. According to the investigation, Military Intelligence coordinated with local authorities and the Union Solidarity and Development Association (USDA), a junta-backed mass organisation that was later reorganised as the Union Solidarity and Development Party (USDP), to organise and transport participants for the attack on Aung San Suu Kyi's convoy near Depayin.

A report dated 19 May 2003 from Military Intelligence Unit No. 1 in Mandalay, cited by the investigation, detailed the mobilisation of 300 members of the USDA, disguised in civilian clothing and placed on standby to attack the National League for Democracy (NLD) convoy. The investigation also noted that former prime minister and Military Intelligence chief Khin Nyunt wrote in his autobiography that he had received reports from Military Intelligence units on the developments leading up to the Depayin attack.

The leaked documents reportedly described advance reconnaissance of the convoy's route, the mobilisation of USDA members from surrounding townships, the distribution of bamboo staves and other weapons, and plans for the arrest of senior National League for Democracy (NLD) members following the assault.

The investigation also reported that Military Intelligence directed efforts to shape domestic and international reporting on the attack. According to leaked documents and former Myanmar Times editor Geoffrey Goddard, Brigadier General Thein Swe, then head of Military Intelligence's international propaganda office, instructed the newspaper to replace its planned front page with a Military Intelligence-prepared article presenting the junta's version of events.

Published on 2 June 2003 under the headline "Motorcyclists from NLD shock town", the article portrayed the violence as clashes involving NLD supporters while omitting allegations contained in the leaked military documents that the attack had been organised by the military, local authorities and USDA members.

Human Rights Watch stated in 2004 that the military government's decision to attack the NLD convoy followed the growing popularity of Aung San Suu Kyi's political tours, during which large crowds reportedly attended her rallies despite efforts by local authorities to discourage participation. According to the organisation, the attack at Depayin marked a significant escalation in the junta's campaign against the opposition.

== Commission observations ==
In making this statement, the Asian Legal Resource Centre concurs with the preliminary findings of the Ad Hoc Commission on the Depayin Massacre, presented on 25 June 2003. In its summary observations on the attack, the Ad Hoc Commission observed that the attack was clearly premeditated and well organised, as indicated by the following:

1. Up to 5,000 persons were brought to a remote rural location for the purpose of attacking the NLD convoy.
2. The attackers were all well-armed and located strategically at two killing sites.
3. Before the motorcade arrived, local authorities threatened people living in nearby villages to stay indoors.
4. The authorities systematically searched for and arrested survivors of the attack.

== ALRC opinion ==
The Asian Legal Resource Centre is of the opinion that the massacre at Depayin clearly amounts to a "widespread or systematic attack directed against [a] civilian population, with a knowledge of the attack" (article 7.1 of the Rome Statute of the International Criminal Court) and is therefore a crime against humanity. To date, however, there has been no serious action taken on the massacre.

== See also ==
- List of massacres in Burma
