= Than Shwe =

Military ruler of Myanmar from 1992 to 2011

Senior General; Agga Maha Thray Sithu; Than Shwe
- သန်းရွှေ
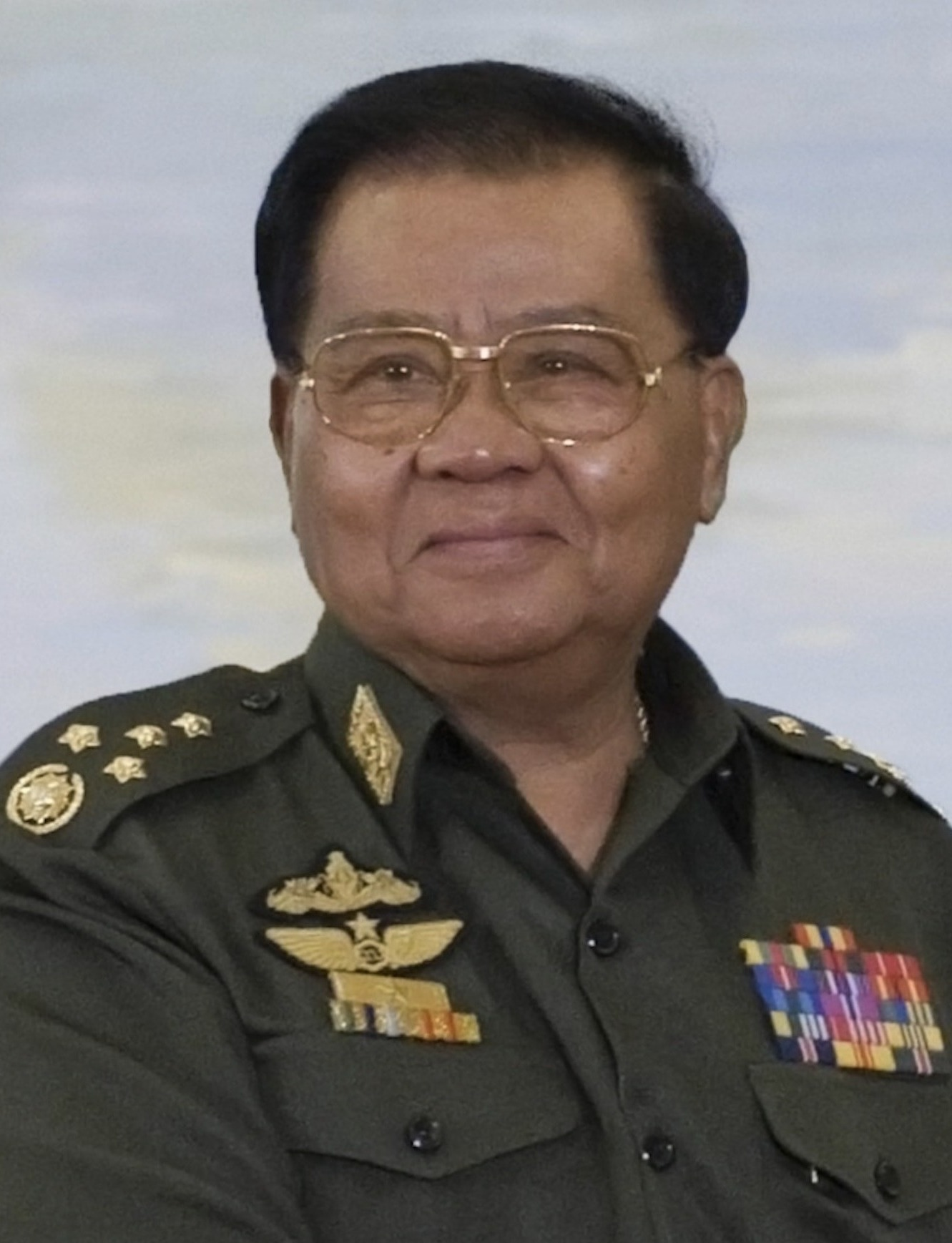
- Than Shwe in 2010

Chairman of the State Peace and Development Council
- In office 15 November 1997 – 30 March 2011
- Prime Minister: Himself; Khin Nyunt; Soe Win; Thein Sein
- Deputy: Maung Aye
- Preceded by: Himself (as Chairman of the State Law and Order Restoration Council)
- Succeeded by: Position abolished Thein Sein (as President)

2nd Chairman of the State Law and Order Restoration Council
- In office 23 April 1992 – 15 November 1997
- Prime Minister: Himself
- Deputy: Maung Aye
- Preceded by: Saw Maung
- Succeeded by: Himself (as Chairman of the State Peace and Development Council)

8th Prime Minister of Myanmar
- In office 23 April 1992 – 25 August 2003
- Leader: Himself
- Deputy: Khin Maung Yin; Maung Maung Khin; Tun Tin
- Preceded by: Saw Maung
- Succeeded by: Khin Nyunt

Commander-in-Chief of Defence Services
- In office 23 April 1992 – 30 March 2011
- Leader: Himself
- Deputy: Maung Aye
- Preceded by: Saw Maung
- Succeeded by: Min Aung Hlaing
Other offices held
1st Vice Chairman of the State Law and Order Restoration Council
In office 21 September 1988 – 23 April 1992
Chairman	Saw Maung
Preceded by	Position created
Succeeded by	Maung Aye
Deputy Prime Minister of Myanmar
In office 21 September 1988 – 23 April 1992
Prime Minister	Saw Maung
Preceded by	Kyaw Htin
Succeeded by	Khin Maung Yin
Deputy Commander-in-Chief of Defence Services
In office 4 November 1985 – 23 April 1992
Commander-in-Chief	Saw Maung
Preceded by	Saw Maung
Succeeded by	Maung Aye

Personal details
- Born: 2 February 1933 (age 93) Kyaukse, Upper Burma, British Burma
- Party: USDA (1993–2010)
- Other political affiliations: BSPP (1962–1988)
- Spouse: Kyaing Kyaing
- Relations: Nay Shwe Thway Aung (grandson)
- Children: 8
- Education: Officers Training School, Bahtoo; Frunze Military Academy

Military service
- Allegiance: Myanmar
- Branch/service: Myanmar Army
- Years of service: 1953–2011
- Rank: Senior General

Than Shwe (Burmese: သန်းရွှေ; pronounced [θáɰ̃ ʃwè]; born 2 February 1933) is a retired Burmese military officer who ruled Myanmar as the second chairman of the State Law and Order Restoration Council, later as the only chairman of the State Peace and Development Council, as well as the commander-in-chief of Defence Services from 1992 until his resignation in 2011, and concurrently served as the eighth prime minister of Myanmar from 1992 to 2003. He previously served as the deputy commander-in-chief of Defence Services from 1985, and the vice chairman of the State Peace and Development Council, and deputy prime minister of Myanmar from 1988 until 1992.

Born in Kyaukse in Upper Burma, Than Shwe received military training and in 1953 joined the Tatmadaw (armed forces), and rose through the ranks. In 1985, he was appointed the deputy commander-in-chief of Defence Services. In 1988, following a coup d'état that followed the 8888 Uprising, Than Shwe was appointed the vice chairman of the newly formed State Peace and Development Council (SPDC) and deputy prime minister by Saw Maung, the new leader of Myanmar. In 1992, Saw Maung stepped down and Than Shwe immediately became the new leader of Myanmar.

As head of state, Than Shwe played a major role in shaping the country's political landscape. He adopted the 2008 Constitution, implementation of various policies aimed at economic development, modernization and infrastructure improvements, and as well as also being involved in efforts to stabilize the country and manage internal conflicts. In 2011, Than Shwe announced his retirement, and officially stepped down as head of state, facilitating the transition to his chosen successor, Thein Sein. As the head of the Armed Forces, he was succeeded by Senior General Min Aung Hlaing.

While Than Shwe's tenure recorded achievements, it also faced scrutiny and criticism, particularly regarding allegations of human rights abuses and restrictions on political freedoms. His tenure coincided with a period of political transition and international scrutiny, with Myanmar experiencing both internal and external challenges. Despite being retired, Than Shwe continues to wield significant influence within the military.

== Early life and education ==
Than Shwe was born on 2 February 1933, in Minzu village, near Kyaukse, British Burma (now Myanmar), to Lay Myint and Seinn Yin. His early education was at the Government High School in Kyaukse, where he completed his studies in 1949. Following his education, he began his career as a postal clerk at the Meikhtila Post Office. However, his path shifted towards the military when he enlisted in the Burmese Army, joining the ninth intake of the Officers Training School, Bahtoo.

== Military career and rise to power ==
After graduating from the Officer Training School, Second Lieutenant Than Shwe assumed the role of a squad leader in No. 1 Infantry Battalion on 11 July 1953. Progressing through the ranks, he was promoted to platoon commander in 1955 with the rank of lieutenant. On 21 February 1957, he advanced to the position of company commander within the same battalion, holding the rank of captain. He demonstrated early leadership and strategic capabilities during military operations in Karen State, Southern Shan State, and the Eastern Thanlwin area conducted by No. 1 Infantry Battalion.

On 26 February 1958, Than Shwe's career took an international turn as he was assigned to the newly established Directorate of Education and Psychological warfare within the War Office. Between April 1958 and November 1958, he underwent specialized army officers' training in the Soviet Union, conducted by the KGB. Subsequently, on 9 December 1961, he assumed the role of a company commander in No. 1 Psychological Warfare Battalion under Northern Regional Military Command on 9 December 1961. He later became the psychological warfare officer of the 3rd Infantry Brigade on 4 December 1961. On 18 December 1963, he was transferred to Central Political College as an instructor. He was then posted to 101 Light Infantry Battalion as a temporary company commander for the battalion headquarters unit.

Promoted to the rank of major, Than Shwe joined the 77th (LID) Light Infantry Division on 27 January 1969. Between 1969 and 1971, he successfully completed the Higher Command and Staff Course at the Frunze Military Academy in the Soviet Union. During the tenure with the 77th LID, he actively participated in military operations across Karen State, Irrawaddy Delta region and Bago Hills. He was transferred to Operations Planning Department within the Office of Chief of Staff (Army) as a General Staff Officer (G2) on 16 December 1969. Than Shwe was nicknamed 'the bulldog' in the military.

He assumed the role of a No. 1 Infantry Battalion on 23 August 1971 and earned a promotion to the rank of lieutenant colonel on 7 September 1972. As the commanding officer of No. 1 Infantry Battalion, he actively participated in offensive operations against various insurgents carried out by the 88th Light Infantry Division (LID) in the Bhamo region, Northern Shan State, Southern Shan State, and Eastern Shan State. Than Shwe was then transferred back to the Operations Planning Department within the Office of Chief of Staff (Army) as a General Staff Officer (G1) on 4 August 1975. On 26 March 1977, he attained the rank of colonel and assumed the position of deputy commander of the 88th LID Light Infantry Division on 2 May 1978.

In March 1980, Than Shwe became commanding officer of the 88th LID. He oversaw various operations, including Operation Ye Naing Aung, Operation Nay Min Yang, and Operation Min Yan Aung, carried out by the 88th LID. In 1981, he was elected as a member of the ruling Burma Socialist Programme Party's Central Executive Committee during the fourth session of the Party's conference.

He took on the role of commanding officer at the Southern Western Regional Military Command on 22 July 1983 and subsequently became the chairman of Irrawaddy Division Party Committee on 5 August 1983. Than Shwe was promoted to brigadier general on 16 August 1984 and assumed the position of vice chief of staff (Army) on 4 November 1985.

Promoted to major general on 4 November 1986 and to lieutenant general on 4 November 1987, he assumed the position of Deputy Minister of Defence on 27 July 1988.

After the military coup on 18 September 1988, following the democracy uprising of 1988, Than Shwe became vice-chairman of State Law and Order Restoration Council (SLORC), a 21-member military cabinet headed by Senior General Saw Maung. He was promoted to the rank of full general and assumed the positions of vice-commander in chief of the Myanmar Armed Forces and commander-in-chief of the Myanmar Army on 18 March 1990.

On 23 April 1992, Senior General Saw Maung unexpectedly resigned, citing health reasons. Than Shwe elevated himself to the rank of senior general and replaced Saw Maung as the head of the State Law and Order Restoration Council and commander-in-chief of the Myanmar Armed Forces.

== Style of leadership ==
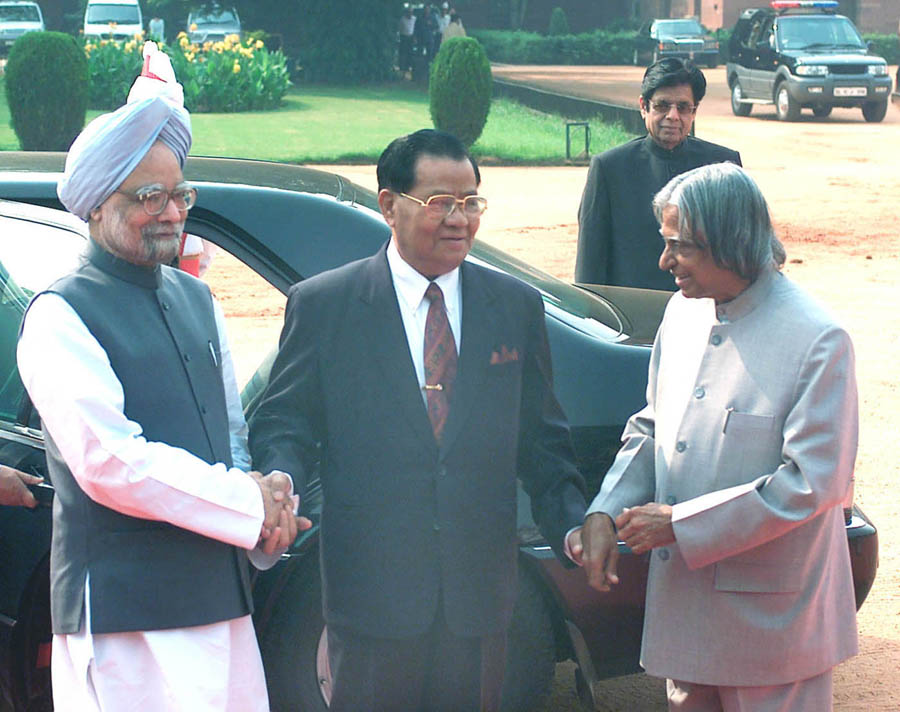
Indian president A. P. J. Abdul Kalam and prime minister Manmohan Singh with Senior General Than Shwe, on October 25, 2004

Than Shwe relaxed some state control over the economy, and was a supporter of Burma's participation in the Association of South East Asian Nations (ASEAN). He also oversaw a large crackdown on corruption, which saw a number of cabinet ministers and regional commanders sacked in 1997.

The convention for the "Discipline Democracy New Constitution" was convened from 9 January 1993 to 3 September 2007, a period of more than 14 years and 8 months. Although the main opposition party, National League for Democracy (NLD) led by Aung San Suu Kyi, which won the multi-party democracy general election in 1990, did not participate, the chairman of National Convention Lieutenant General Thein Sein announced that the creation of the "Constitution" had been accomplished.

Than Shwe has continued the suppression of the free press in Burma, and has overseen the detention of journalists who oppose his regime. While he oversaw the release of Aung San Suu Kyi during the late 1990s, he also oversaw her return to detention in 2003. Despite his relaxation of some restrictions on Burma's economy, his economic policies have been often criticized as ill-planned. He advocated for Crony capitalism.

He maintains a low profile, often perceived as reserved and serious, with a reputation as a hardliner and a skilled manipulator. Some observers note that he opposes the democratization of Burma. He marks national holidays and ceremonies with messages in the state-run newspapers but rarely engages with the press. The lavish wedding of his daughter, involving diamonds and champagne, was particularly controversial in a country whose people continue to suffer enormous poverty and enforced austerity.

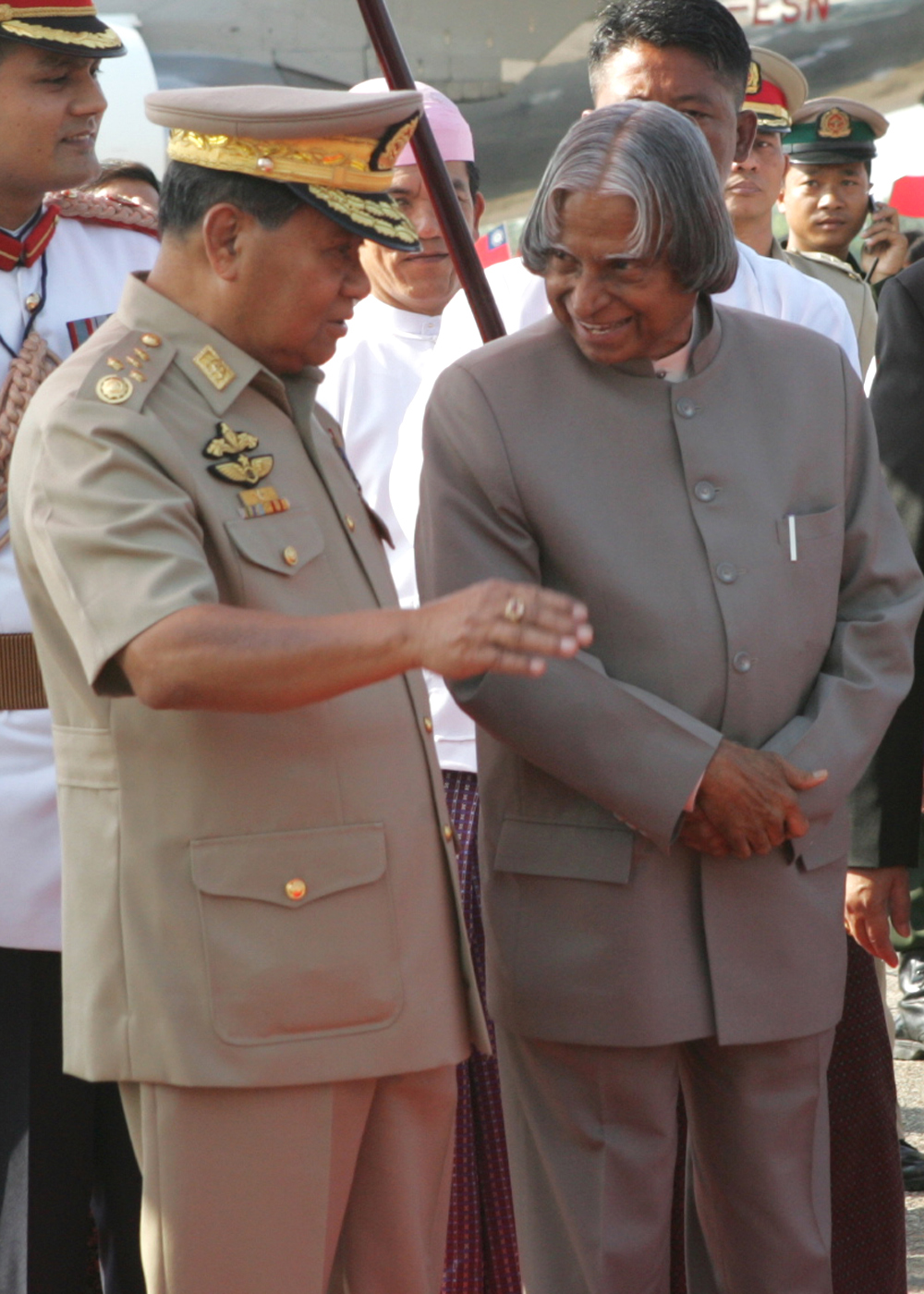
India's President A.P.J. Abdul Kalam is being welcomed by Senior General Than Shwe, on arrival at Yangon International Airport, Myanmar, 2006

Power struggles have plagued Burma's military leadership. Than Shwe has been linked to the toppling and arrest of Prime Minister Khin Nyunt in 2004, which has significantly increased his own power. The former premier, who said he supported Aung San Suu Kyi's involvement in the National Convention, was seen as a moderate at odds with the junta's hardliners.

Than Shwe is said to rely heavily on advice from his soothsayers, a style of ruling dating back to General Ne Win, a leader who once shot his mirror to avoid bad luck.

In May and November 2006 he met with the United Nations special envoy Ibrahim Gambari in the newly built capital of Naypyidaw, which had replaced Yangon in the previous year, and permitted Gambari to meet with Aung San Suu Kyi. However, Than Shwe refused to meet Gambari when he visited Burma in November 2007 and again on 10 March 2008.

In early May 2008, Than Shwe refused many foreign aid workers from entering the country in the aftermath of Cyclone Nargis (2 May 2008). This led to many criticisms from the UN as well as the international community.

In early July 2009, the UN Secretary-General Ban Ki-Moon visited Burma and held talks with Senior General Than Shwe. The military junta rejected UN Secretary General's request to meet with Aung San Suu Kyi. Than Shwe also commented on the upcoming 2010 Burmese election, saying that by the time the UN chief next visits Burma, "I will be an ordinary citizen, a lay person, and my colleagues will too because it will be a civilian government."

On 27 August 2010, rumours surfaced that Than Shwe and his deputy, Vice-Senior General Maung Aye, along with six other top military officers, had resigned their military posts, and that he was expected to remain head of state until at least the end of the 2011 fiscal year, when he would transfer his position to the elected president. The rumor was proven false as the Burmese state media referred to him as "Senior General" three days later.

=== Human rights controversies ===
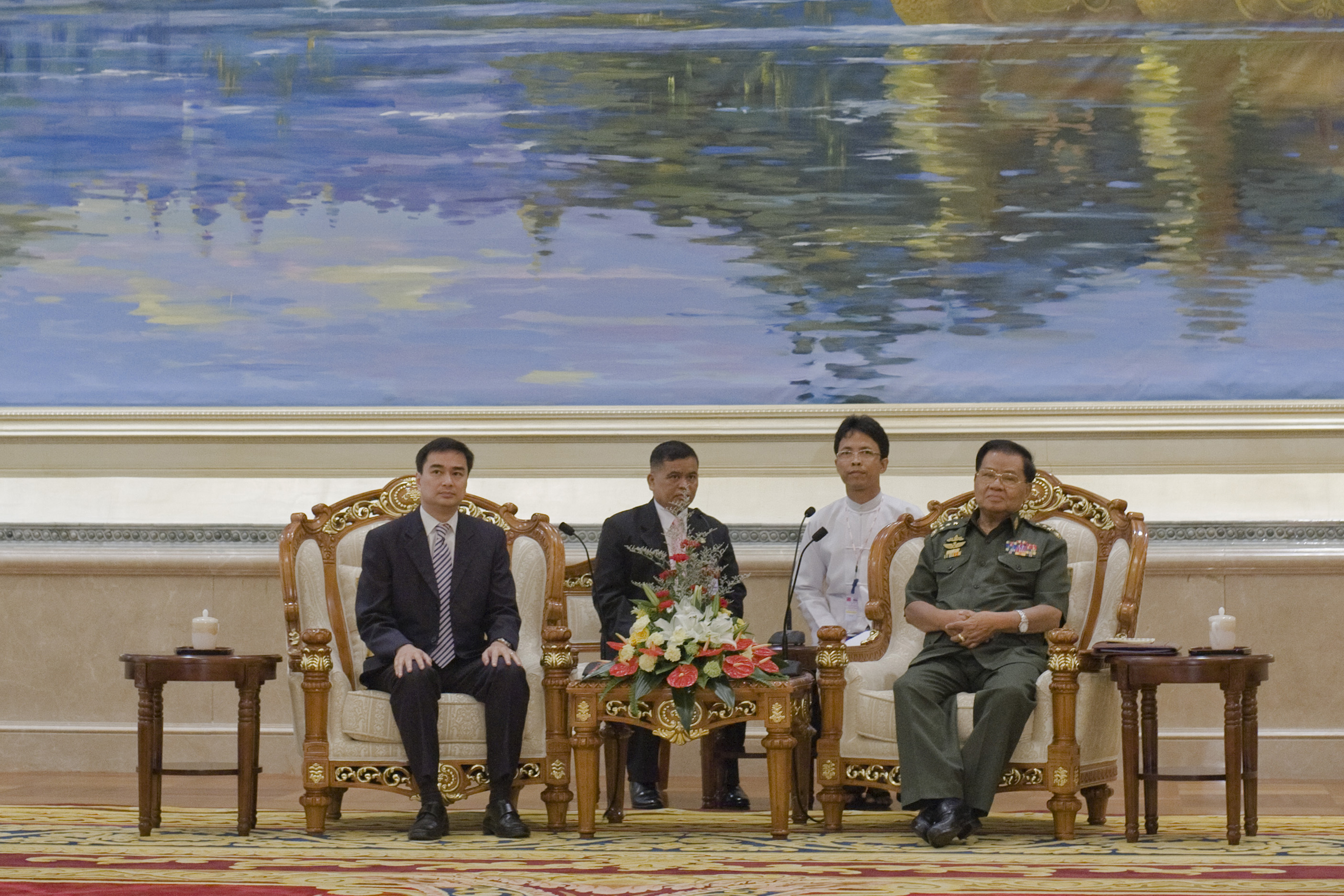
Senior General Than Shwe meets with Thai Prime Minister Abhisit Vejjajiva at Naypyidaw in 2010.

Than Shwe's leadership has faced criticism for violence and human rights abuses. According to Amnesty International, human rights violation in Myanmar were described as "widespread and systematic." Reports suggested that a significant number of Burmese individuals, potentially reaching up to a million, were allegedly subjected to forced labor in "jungle gulags". The absence of free speech and intolerance towards dissent were notable characteristics of the government. In 2007, during the Saffron Revolution, mass demonstrations led by Buddhist monks were suppressed by security forces, resulting in casualties and detentions. Persistent rumors circulated that thousands of monks and others being rounded up and summarily executed, with their bodies reportedly dumped in the jungle.

In 1998 Than Shwe ordered the execution of 59 civilians living on Christie Island. The local commander initially hesitated, expressing concerns about the issuing commander's alleged intoxication, but was informed that the instruction came from "Aba Gyi" or "Great Father", a term used to refer to Senior General Than Shwe.

== Health and family ==
Than Shwe's wife, Kyaing Kyaing, is of Chinese and Pa'O descent. They have five daughters and three sons. Than Shwe is known to be a diabetic, and he is rumored to have intestinal cancer. Little else is known about his private life as he rarely makes public appearances or discloses personal information.

Than Shwe flew to Singapore on 31 December 2006. Concerns about Than's health intensified after he failed to appear at an official Independence Day dinner for military leaders, officials, and diplomats on 4 January 2007. It was the first time since he took power in 1992 that Shwe did not host the annual dinner. Than Shwe had checked out of the Singapore General Hospital, where he had been receiving treatment, and returned to Burma two weeks later.

In 2006, a home video footage of the wedding of Than Shwe's daughter, Thandar Shwe, was leaked on the Internet, which sparked controversy and criticism from Burmese and foreign media for the lavish and seemingly ostentatious reception. After days of Saffron Revolution, there were unconfirmed reports that Than Shwe's wife and pets fled the country on 27 September 2007, possibly to Laos.

In January 2009, Than Shwe was talked into buying one of the world's most popular football clubs, Manchester United, for $1 billion by his favourite grandson Nay Shwe Thway Aung. However, he reportedly abandoned the plan, because such an investment only months after nearly 150,000 people were killed by Cyclone Nargis was deemed inappropriate.

In August 2021, Than Shwe and his wife tested positive for COVID-19. They have been warded at the 1,000-bed military-owned hospital in Thaik Chaung.

On 23 October 2024, a significant event unfolded when Nay Soe Maung, Than Shwe's son-in-law married to Kyi Kyi Shwe, was detained by Myanmar's current military government in Pyigyidagun Township, Mandalay. A medical doctor and former military officer, Nay Soe Maung is also the father of Nay Shwe Thway Aung, Than Shwe's grandson. The authorities cited concerns over his social media activities, claiming they disrupted public order and incited unrest. This arrest has drawn attention, particularly given Nay Soe Maung's previous criticisms of the military’s response to civil resistance after the 2021 coup.

The incident reflects the ongoing tensions within the country's military elite and questions the enduring influence of Than Shwe's legacy. Nay Soe Maung's situation, despite past ties to the current leadership, highlights that familial connections do not guarantee protection in the current political landscape.

In a show of support for his father, Nay Shwe Thway Aung posted on his Facebook story on 26 October 2024: "Doing such things makes the people suffer... Let's think carefully," and in Burmese: "အဲ့လိုတွေလုပ်လေပြည်သူကနာကျည်းလေ.. စဉ်းစားချင့်ချိန်လုပ်ကြပါ.."

== Yadaya rituals ==
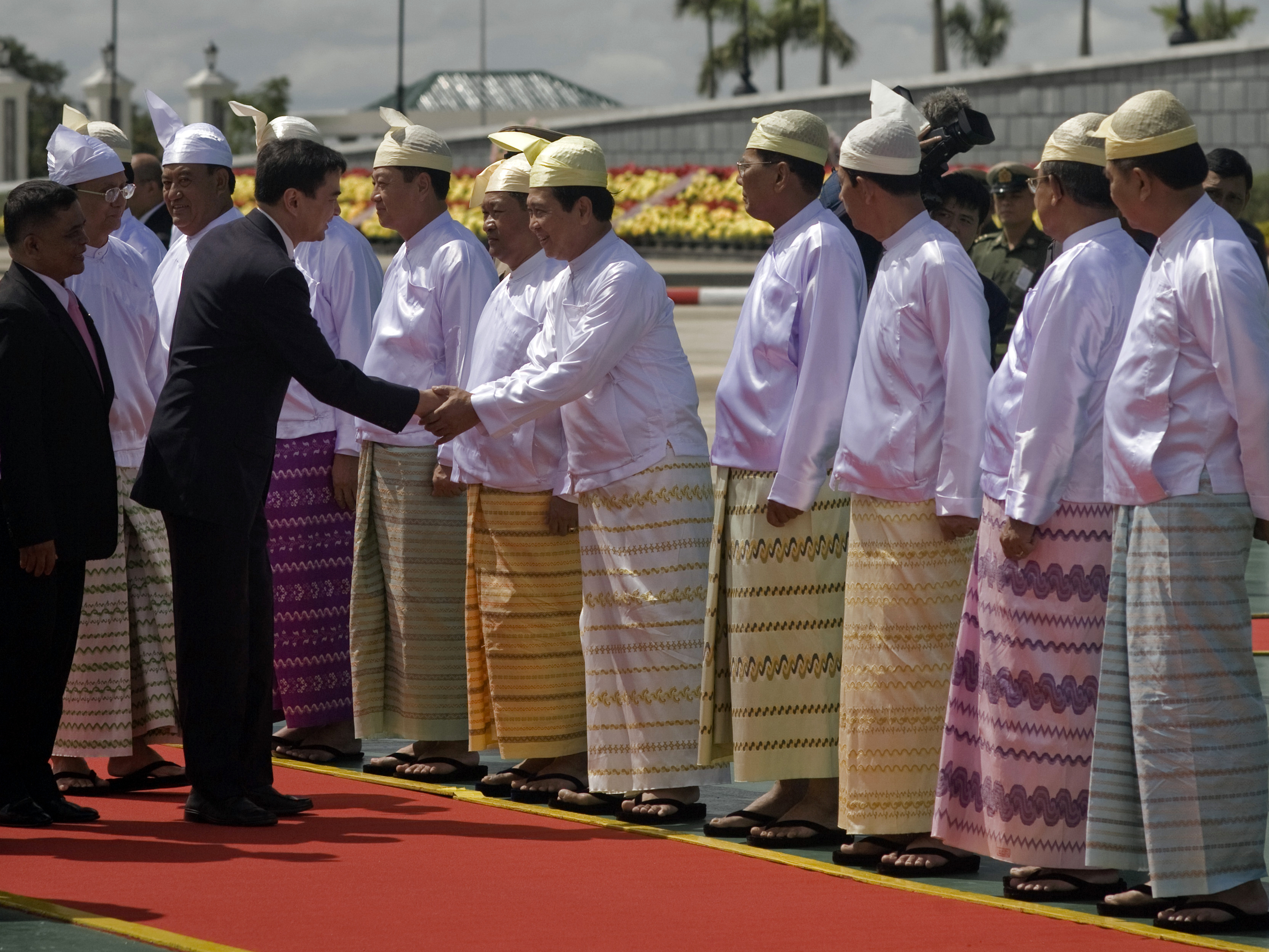
In an October 2010 state visit, Burmese State Peace and Development Council members greeted Thai PM Abhisit Vejjajiva in acheik patterned longyi typically worn by women. Various sources attributed this to yadaya practices.

Than Shwe often performed superstitious yadaya rituals to maintain his power and followed the advice of astrologers and shamans. A seated jade Buddha statue that Than Shwe had carved in his image was erected in 1999 at the southern entrance of Shwedagon pagoda. It is on a list of unorthodox statues drawn up by the religious affairs ministry. Former UN secretary-general Ban Ki-moon and General Secretary of the Chinese Communist Party Xi Jinping are among those who have paid respects at the statue during visits to Yangon.

Though superstitious, the unusual clothing choices, namely the wearing of traditional female acheik-patterned longyi (sarongs) by Than Shwe and other military generals at public appearances, including Union Day celebrations in February 2011 and at the reception of the Lao Prime Minister Bouasone Bouphavanh in June 2011 have also been attributed to yadaya, as a way to divert power to neutralize Aung San Suu Kyi's power.

== Bibliography ==
- Johnson, Robert (2005). A region in turmoil: South Asian conflicts since 1947. Reaktion Books. ISBN 978-1-86189-257-7.

Political offices
Preceded by Saw Maung	Chairman of the State Law and Order Restoration Council; After 1997 State Peace and Development Council; 1992–2011	Succeeded by Thein Sein as President of Myanmar
Preceded by Saw Maung	Prime Minister of Myanmar; 1992–2003	Succeeded by Khin Nyunt
Military offices
Preceded by Saw Maung	Commander-in-Chief of Defence Services; 1992–2011	Succeeded by Min Aung Hlaing
