= Senior general (Myanmar) =

Military rank in Myanmar

Senior general ဗိုလ်ချုပ်မှူးကြီး
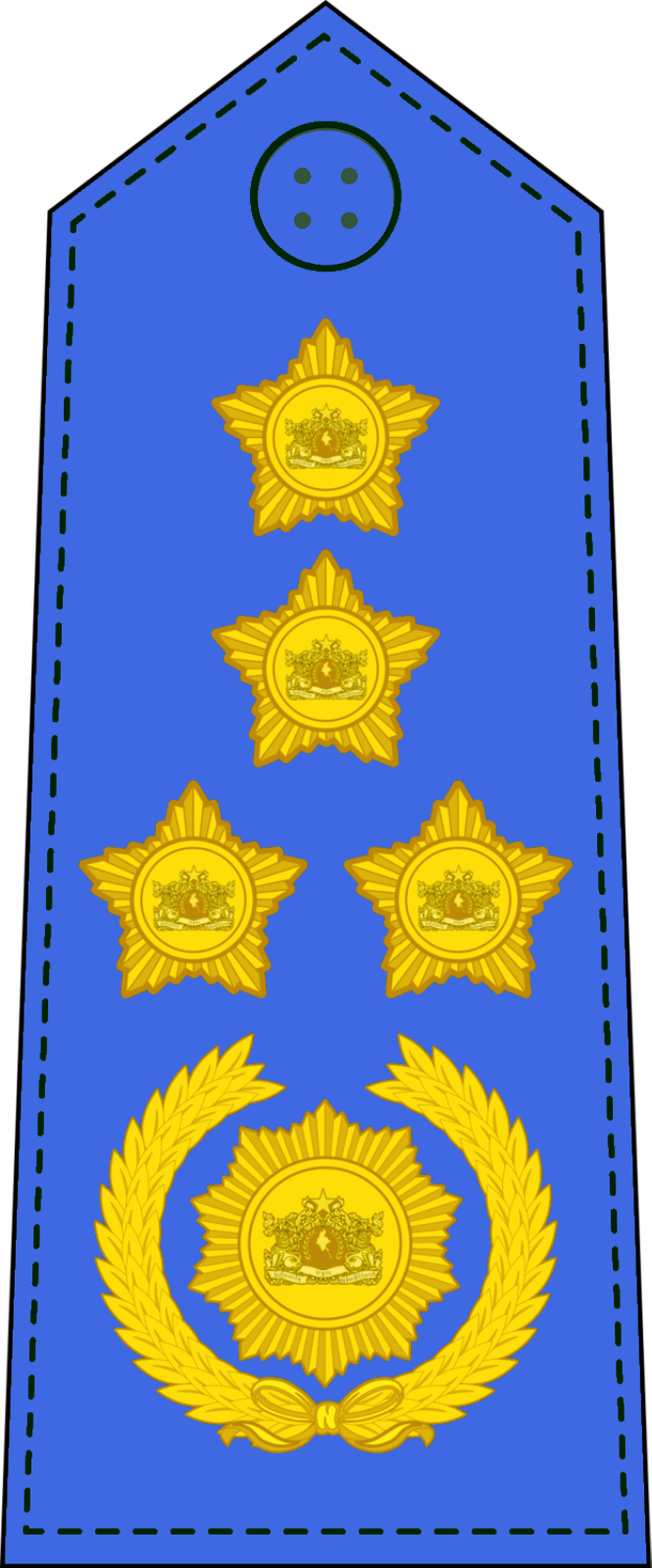
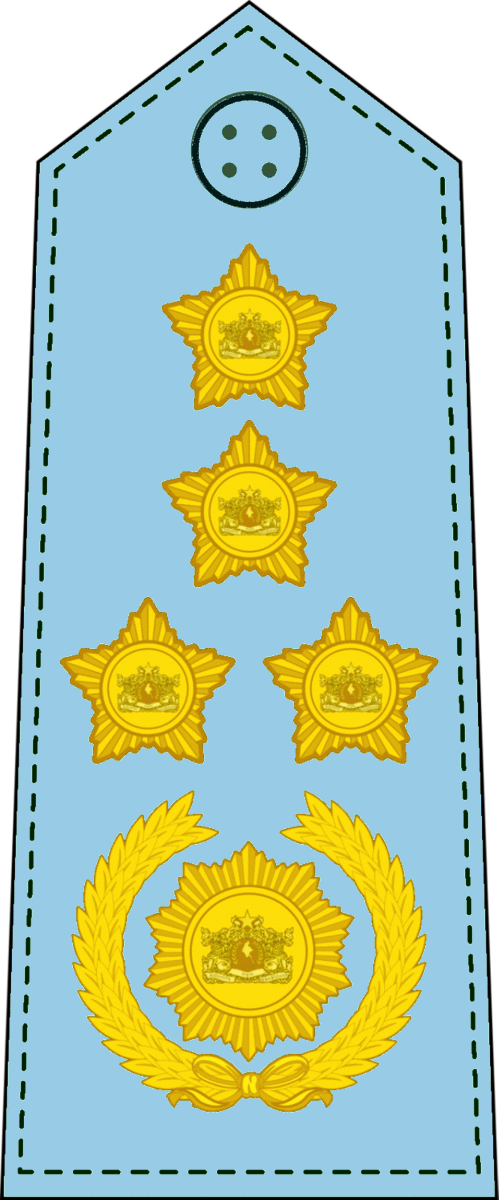
- Army, navy and air force insignia

- Star plate
- Country: Myanmar
- Service branch: Myanmar Army; Myanmar Navy; Myanmar Air Force
- Formation: 18 March 1990
- Next lower rank: Vice-senior general

Senior general (Burmese: ဗိုလ်ချုပ်မှူးကြီး, romanized: builʻkhyupʻmhūʺkrīʺ) is five-star general officer rank, the highest in the Tatmadaw (the armed forces of Myanmar), only held by the Commander-in-Chief of Defence Services (CinCDS). It is equivalent to Field Marshal in the British Army and General of the Army in the United States Army. Since 2011, an officer appointed as CinCDS has to be quickly promoted one higher rank every year until he gets to the rank of Senior general.

An officer holding the rank of Senior general can wear any uniform from any of the branches of the Tatmadaw (armed forces of Myanmar.

== History ==
In 1990, the Myanmar Armed Forces underwent structural changes, during which Commander-in-Chief General Saw Maung elevated himself to the rank of Senior General on 18 March 1990, becoming the first person to hold this rank. Than Shwe was subsequently promoted directly from the rank of General to Senior General on 23 April 1993. He served in this position until his retirement on 30 March 2011. In March 2013, Min Aung Hlaing was promoted to Senior General from his prior role as Vice-senior general.

== List of rank holders ==
No.	Portrait	Name (Birth–Death)	Term of service			Notes	Ref.
No.	Portrait	Name (Birth–Death)	Promoted	Retired	Time serving	Notes	Ref.
1		Saw Maung (1928–1997)	18 March 1990	24 April 1992	2 years, 37 days	Promoted directly from General	
2		Than Shwe (born 1933)	23 April 1993	30 March 2011	17 years, 341 days	Promoted directly from General	
3		Min Aung Hlaing (born 1956)	March 2013	10 April 2026	13 years, 40 days	Promoted from Vice-senior general. Despite having retired from the office of Commander-in-Chief of Defence Services on 30 March 2026, he still used the military rank of Senior General until hours before his inauguration as president on 10 April 2026.	

== See also ==
- Military ranks of Myanmar
- Four-star rank (Myanmar)
