= 2008 Myanmar constitutional referendum =

- 10 May 2008 (24 May 2008 in some townships)

Results
Choice	Votes	%
Yes	24,764,124	93.82%
No	1,631,712	6.18%
Valid votes	26,395,836	98.58%
Invalid or blank votes	380,839	1.42%
Total votes	26,776,675	100.00%
Registered voters/turnout	27,288,827	98.12%

A constitutional referendum was held in Myanmar on 10 May 2008 (24 May 2008 in some townships) according to an announcement by the State Peace and Development Council in February 2008. According to the military government, the new Constitution of Myanmar will ensure the creation of a "discipline-flourishing democracy". Multi-party elections followed in 2010.

The constitutional referendum law was enacted and a referendum commission was set up on 26 February 2008. Reportedly, the law ensures the secret casting of votes and requires a public count of the ballots to prove it is fair.

The draft constitution was published and the date of the referendum finally announced on 9 April 2008. Among the changes that the referendum sought to make were:

- One quarter of all parliamentary seats would be reserved for military officers.
- The Ministry of Home Affairs would fall exclusively under military control.
- Anyone married to a person who was not a citizen of Myanmar would be barred from running for the office of president. Many international media reports suggest that this provision would have the effect of making opposition leader Aung San Suu Kyi ineligible for the presidency, although her British husband died in 1999.

== Campaign ==
Three weeks before the referendum, the front page of the state press was headlined "Let's Vote Yes for National Interest." Many songs, poems, cartoons and editorials urging people to vote "yes" were published in local and national news media.

The opposition National League for Democracy called for people to vote "no" to the constitution. However, the N.L.D. claimed their campaign against the constitution was violently suppressed, with activists arrested and material confiscated.

The Kachin Independence Organisation, an opposition group which participated in the government's "National Convention" process, called on its members to abstain, saying the government had failed to respond to its demands.

== Criticism ==
Cyclone Nargis hit Myanmar a few days before the referendum, and the vote was postponed to 24 May in the most severely affected areas — 7 out of 26 townships in Irrawaddy Division and 40 out of 45 townships in Yangon Division. United Nations Secretary General Ban Ki-moon called for the referendum to be postponed in full to concentrate on the "national tragedy," but the government rejected this. The Junta came under heavy criticism for diverting critical resources from survivors toward the referendum, including evicting refugees from shelters such as schools so that these can be used as polling stations. Massive fraud and intimidation was also reported.

On 6 May 2008, the United States Congress passed a condemnation of the Myanmar constitution and referendum, by a 413–1 vote (the "no" vote cast by Ron Paul).

== Voting ==
There were many allegations of electoral fraud on the day of the election, including:

- A village visited by officials in advance of the referendum where 185 people were forced to vote "yes" with absentee ballots
- Officials giving out ballot papers already filled in with a tick
- Voters ordered to complete votes for their relatives
- Government officials sitting close to the ballot boxes and telling voters how to vote
- Voters bribed to vote "yes"
- Officials closing polling stations at 11:00 a.m. and then going to the houses of people who hadn't voted and making them vote then

Opposition groups, including the All Burma Monks' Alliance, the 88 Generation Students Group and the All Burma Federation of Student Unions, described the referendum as a sham.

== Voting dates ==
=== 10 May 2008 ===
After the first day of the referendum, the Democratic Promotion Organ of Burma and the Democratic Voice of Burma complained about election fraud. They claimed that, according to witness reports, it was impossible to vote "no" because voters were issued voting ballots that had already been marked "support" and were sent to prison if they refused the pre-marked ballot. It was also reported that there were two separate ballot boxes which were monitored by officials who could see how people voted, which this might have intimidated voters or allowed for later recriminations. Furthermore, as with many referendums relating to procedural matters, there was concern that many people did not understand the details of what they were voting for, and that this might have affected the vote. The Myanma Junta stated that the referendum would easily be supported.

== Results ==
The day after the election, local media cited informal reports of referendum results as follows:

- Seven constituencies in Myingyan Township, Mandalay Division: 67% Yes
- Meikhtila Township, Mandalay Division: 67% Yes
- Five townships in Kachin State: 62% Yes
- Two townships in Shan State: 67% No
- Yenanchaung Township, Magwe Division: 53% Yes

Final results were not expected before the end of May; they were announced on 30 May 2008.

On 15 May 2008, the junta announced that the constitution had been approved by 92.4% of voters, claiming a 99% turnout in the two-thirds of the region that had held the vote.

Burmese constitutional referendum, 2008
Choice	Votes	%
For	24,764,124	93.82
Against	1,631,712	6.18
Total	26,395,836	100.00
Valid votes	26,395,836	98.58
Invalid/blank votes	380,839	1.42
Total votes	26,776,675	100.00
Registered voters/turnout	27,288,827	98.12
Source: People's Daily Online
