= Emblem of Tatmadaw =

Emblem of Myanmar Tatmadaw

Versions
- Cap Badges: Commissioned officers (left), NCOs and other ranks (right).

- The version used for mark logo and on collar tabs and belt head insignias.
- Armiger: Myanmar Defence Services (Myanma Tatmadaw)
- Adopted: 1990
- Crest: A barn star Or
- Shield: Gule, The Tatmadaw logo Or, surrounded by olive branches with 30 leaves on each sides Or
- Supporters: Burmese floral arabesques (Kanote)
- Motto: ရဲသော်မသေ သေသော် ငရဲမလား
- Myanmar Coast Guard Cap Badges

The full emblem of Tatmadaw is used as the cap badge of all personnel in the Army, Navy and Air Force. It is also used as an official seal and a logo.

== History ==
=== 1948–1977 ===
Emblem of Bama Tatmadaw
- Armiger: Armed Forces of the Union of Burma (1948-1955) Defence Services (Tatmadaw) (1955-1962) People's Defence Services (Pyithu Tatmadaw) (after 1962)
- Adopted: 1948
- Relinquished: 1977
- Crest: A lion sejant Or
- Shield: Azure, a map of Myanmar Gule
- Supporters: Two lion sejant Or
- Motto: ပြည်ထောင်စု သမတမြန်မာ နိုင်ငံတော်

The first emblem of post-independence Burmese Armed Forces (Bama Tatmadaw) is a derivative work of the State Seal of Burma at that time; the circle of samaggānaṃ tapo sukho from the State seal is replaced by a shield in the Tatmadaw emblem.

=== 1977–1990 ===
Emblem of Pyithu Tatmadaw
- Armiger: People's Defence Services (Pyithu Tatmadaw)
- Adopted: 1977
- Relinquished: 1990
- Crest: A barn star Or
- Shield: Azure, a map of Myanmar Gule, surrounded by a pinion Or which is also surrounded by paddy ears Or
- Supporters: Burmese floral arabesque (Kanote)
- Motto: ရဲသော်မသေ သေသော် ငရဲမလား

The State seal was changed in 1974, and the Tatmadaw emblem was changed on 1st October 1977. The then new emblem is with a red map of the country, surrounded by a pinion and two ears of paddy, headed by a star (which are also the ones added to the State seal). Instead of using the name of the country, the Tatmadaw started to include its motto on its emblem. It also excluded the lions which was included in the former one.

== See also ==
- State Seal of Myanmar
- Military ranks of Myanmar
