= Myanmar kyat =

Currency of Myanmar

မြန်မာကျပ်ငွေ (formal) (Burmese); မြန်မာကျပ် (informal) (Burmese)
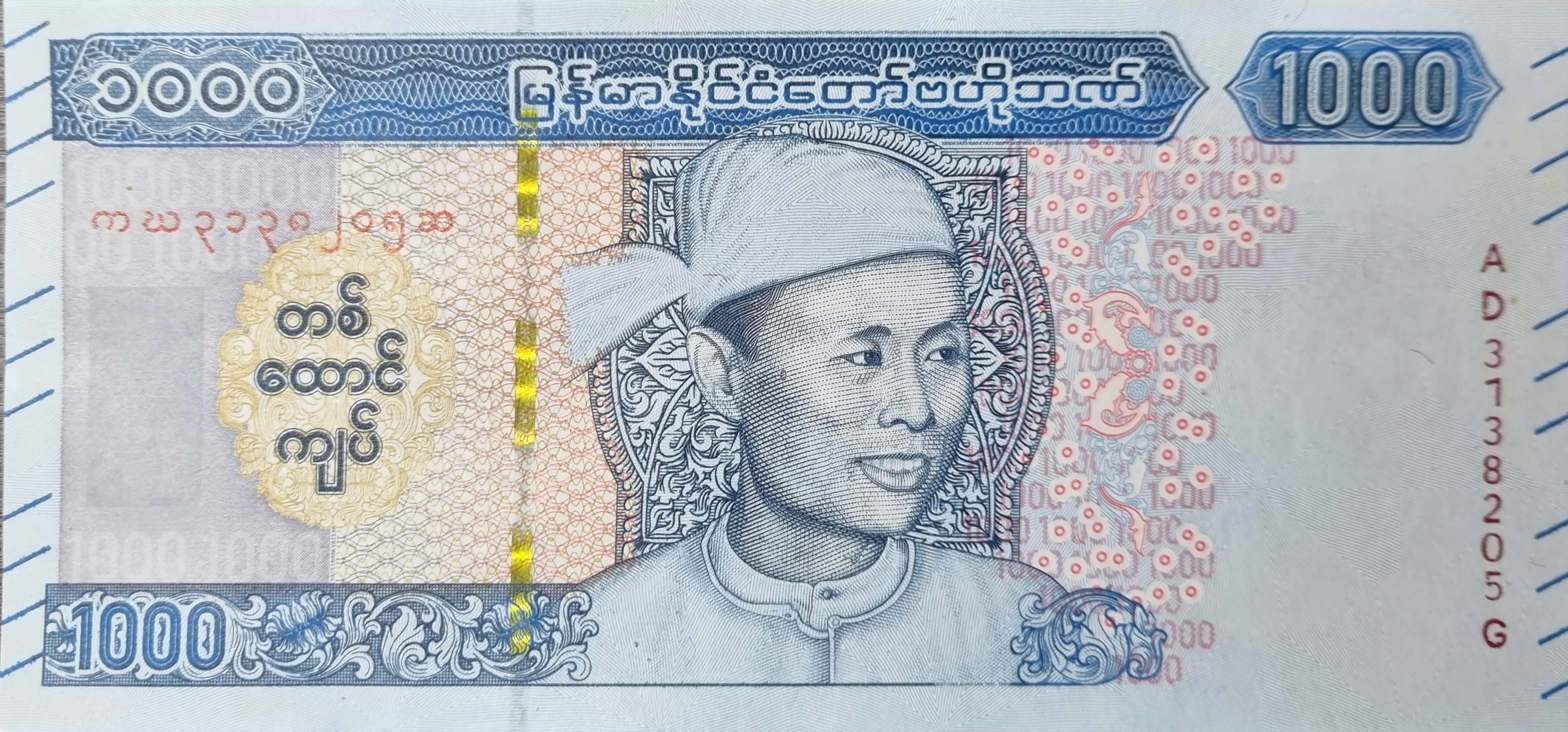
- Ks. 1,000/- (2020)

ISO 4217
- Code: MMK (numeric: 104)
- Subunit: 0.01

Units of account
- Symbol: K (singular); Ks. (plural)
- Subunit
- 1/100: pya

Denominations
- Banknotes
- Freq. used: Ks. 50/-, Ks. 100/-, Ks. 200/-, Ks. 500/-, Ks. 1,000/-, Ks. 5,000/-, Ks. 10,000/-
- Rarely used: Ks. -/50, K 1/-, Ks. 5/-, Ks. 10/-, Ks. 20/-, Ks. 20,000/-
- Coins
- Rarely used: K 1/-, Ks. 5/-, Ks. 10/-, Ks. 50/-, Ks. 100/-.

Demographics
- Replaced: Burmese rupee
- User(s): Myanmar

Issuance
- Central bank: Central Bank of Myanmar
- Website: www.cbm.gov.mm

Valuation
- Inflation: 23%
- Source: The World Factbook, 2023 est.

The kyat (US: /ˈtʃɑːt/ or /ˈkjɑːt/; Burmese: ကျပ် [tɕɛʔ] or [tɕaʔ]; ISO 4217 code MMK) is the currency of Myanmar (Burma). The typical notation for the kyat is "K" (singular) and "Ks." (plural), placed before the numerals followed by "/-". Amounts less than K. 1/- are typically denoted with the number of pyas following "-/" (e.g. -/50 denotes half a kyat).

The term kyat derives from the Burmese unit kyattha (Burmese: ကျပ်သား), equal to about 16 grams (1/2 troy oz) of silver. Etymologically, kyat originally means 'to be tight, to be stiff,' cognate with Old Chinese 狹 (*N-kˤ<r>ep; to be narrow) and 夾 (*kˤ<r>ep, to clamp, to place between), perhaps may be referring to the minting process of pressing coins.

== Current MMK exchange rates ==
From 2001 to 2012, the official exchange rate varied between Ks. 5/75 and Ks. 6/70 per US dollar (Ks. 8/20 to Ks. 7/- per euro). However, the street rate (black market rate), which more accurately took into account the standing of the national economy, has varied from Ks. 750/- to Ks. 1,335/- per USD (Ks. 985/- to Ks. 1,475/- per EUR). The black market exchange rates (USD to MMK) tend todecrease during the peak of the tourist season in Myanmar (December to January). During the 2003 Myanmar banking crisis, the kyat's black market rate appreciated when distrust in kyat-deposited banks increased demand for kyat banknotes. At its peak, the kyat traded for as high as Ks. 850/- per USD.

On 2 April 2012, the Central Bank of Myanmar announced that the value of the kyat against the US dollar would float, setting an initial rate of Ks.818/- per US dollar.

On 20 March 2013, the Finance Ministry announced that it would abolish Foreign Exchange Certificates (FEC), which were mandatory for tourists to buy at least US$200 worth of until 2003, a measure used to discourage visitors from using the forex black market.

More than a year after a coup d'état caused the overthrow of the elected government, capital flight from Myanmar and inflation accelerated, causing the value of the kyat to plummet to 3500 kyats per USD in the informal market as of August 2022. By May 2024, the exchange rate had increased to 5000/- per USD on the black market, with the junta reportedly abandoning the fixed exchange rate of 2100.

Current MMK exchange rates
From Google Finance:	AUD CAD CHF CNY EUR GBP HKD JPY USD BDT INR THB
From Yahoo! Finance:	AUD CAD CHF CNY EUR GBP HKD JPY USD BDT INR THB
From XE.com:	AUD CAD CHF CNY EUR GBP HKD JPY USD BDT INR THB
From OANDA:	AUD CAD CHF CNY EUR GBP HKD JPY USD BDT INR THB

== History ==
=== First kyat, 1852–1889 ===
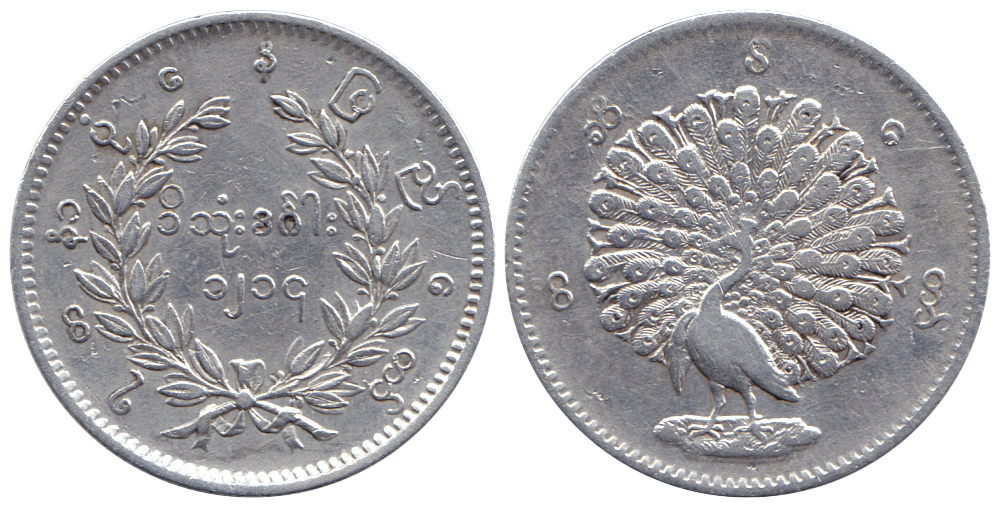
1 kyat silver coin of King Mindon Min, 1853

The kyat was a denomination of both silver and gold coinages in Burma until 1889. It was divided into 16 pe, each of 4 pya, with the mu and mat worth 2 and 4 pe, respectively. Nominally, 16 silver kyats equal 1 gold kyat. The silver kyat was equivalent to the Indian rupee, which replaced the kyat after Burma was conquered by the British.

=== Second Kyat, 1943–1945 ===
When the Japanese occupied Burma in 1942, they introduced a currency based on the rupee. This was later replaced by banknotes in all kyat denominations. This kyat was subdivided into 100 cents. The currency became worthless at the end of the war when the Burmese rupee was reintroduced in 1945.

=== Third kyat, 1952–present ===
The present kyat was introduced on 1 July 1952. It replaced the rupee at par. Decimalisation also took place, with the kyat subdivided into 100 pyas.

== Coins ==
=== First kyat ===
During the Konbaung dynasty, Mindon Min, the second to last King of Burma, established the Royal Mint in Mandalay (Central Burma). The dies were made in Paris. Silver coins were minted in denominations of 1 pe, 1 mu (2 pe), 1 mat (4 pe), 5 mu (8 pe) and 1 kyat, with gold 1 pe and 1 mu. The obverses bore the Royal Peacock Seal, from which the coins got their name. The reverse contained the denomination and mint date (in the Burmese era, which starts from AD 638). In the 1860s and 1870s, lead coins were issued for 1/8 and 1/4 pya, with copper, brass, tin and iron 1/4 pe (1 pya) and copper 2 pya. Further gold coins were issued in 1866 for 1 pe, 2 1/2 mu and 1 kyat, with 5 mu issued in 1878.

=== Second kyat ===
No coins were issued for this currency.

=== Third kyat ===
In 1952, coins were introduced in denominations of 1, 5, 10, 25 and 50 pyas and K 1/-. The new coins bore the same obverse figure of the Chinthe from the Second kyat coins and the same reverse design, with the value of the coin in Burmese script and numerals surrounded by Burmese flower designs.

1956-1966 issued coins
Image		Value	Technical parameters			Description			Date of issue
Obverse	Reverse	Value	Diameter	Mass	Composition	Edge	Obverse	Reverse	Date of issue
		1 pya	18 mm	2.2 g	Bronze; 90% copper 10% zinc	Plain	Chinthe	Value (digit), Value (writing), year of minting, Myanmar flower designs	1956
		5 pyas	19.5 mm	3.17 g	Copper-nickel	Plain	Chinthe	Value (digit), Value (writing), year of minting, Myanmar flower designs	1956
		10 pyas	19.5 mm	4.46 g	Copper-nickel	Plain	Chinthe	Value (digit), Value (writing), year of minting, Myanmar flower designs	1956
		25 pyas	24.1 mm	6.78 g	Copper-nickel	Plain	Chinthe	Value (digit), Value (writing), year of minting, Myanmar flower designs	1956
		50 pyas	26 mm	7.8 g	Copper-nickel	Security edge	Chinthe	Value (digit), Value (writing), year of minting, Myanmar flower designs	1956
		1 kyat	30.5 mm	11.65 g	Copper-nickel	Security edge	Chinthe	Value (digit), Value (writing), year of minting, Myanmar flower designs	1956
These images are to scale at 2.5 pixels per millimetre. For table standards, see the coin specification table.

In 1966, all coins were redesigned to feature Aung San on the obverse and were all changed in composition to aluminium. Furthermore, the coins were slightly reduced in size. However, they retained the same shapes and overall appearance of the previous series of coins. These were circulated until being discontinued in 1983.

In 1983, a new series of coins was issued in bronze or brass 5, 10, 25, 50 pyas and cupro-nickel 1 kyat. Although the 25 pyas were initially round, it was later redesigned as hexagonal due to size and appearance confusions with the 10 and 50 pyas. These would be the last official series of coins to be issued under the name of "Burma."

1 pya coins were last minted in 1966, with the 5 and 25 pyas last minted in 1987 and the 10 and 50 pyas in 1991.

In 1999, a new series of coins was issued in denominations of bronze K 1/-, brass Ks. 5/- and Ks. 10/-, and cupro-nickel Ks. 50/- and Ks. 100/- under the name "Central Bank of Myanmar." These are also the first coins of Burma to depict Latin letters. These coins were intended for vendors and services as an alternative to large amounts of worn out, low denomination banknotes. High inflation has since pushed these coins out of circulation.

In late 2008, the Myanmar government announced that new Ks. 50/- and Ks. 100/- coins would be issued. According to newspaper articles, the new Ks. 50/- coin would be made of copper, with the usual Burmese lion on the obverse and the Lotus Fountain from Naypyidaw on the reverse. The Ks.100/- coin would be of cupro-nickel and depict the Burmese lion on the obverse and the value on the reverse.

1991 Series
Image	Value	Technical parameters			Description			Date of first minting
Image	Value	Diameter	Weight	Composition	Edge	Obverse	Reverse	Date of first minting
	10 pyas	20.4 mm		Brass		Rice plant, "Central Bank of Myanmar" in Burmese	Value in Burmese numerals	1991
	50 pyas	24.6 mm		Brass		Rice plant, "Central Bank of Myanmar" in Burmese	Value in Burmese numerals	1991
1999 Series
	K 1/-	19.03	2.95	Bronze	Plain	Chinthe, "Central Bank of Myanmar" and value in Burmese	Bank title and value in English and Arabic numerals	1999
	Ks. 5/-	20 mm	2.73 g	Brass	Plain	Chinthe, "Central Bank of Myanmar" and value in Burmese	Bank title and value in English and Arabic numerals	1999
	Ks. 10/-	22.3 mm	4.45 g	Brass		Chinthe, "Central Bank of Myanmar" and value in Burmese	Bank title and value in English and Arabic numerals	1999
	Ks. 50/-	23.85 mm	5.06 g	Cupronickel	Reeded	Chinthe, "Central Bank of Myanmar" and value in Burmese	Bank title and value in English and Arabic numerals	1999
	Ks. 100/-	26.8 mm	7.52 g	Cupronickel	Reeded	Chinthe, "Central Bank of Myanmar" and value in Burmese	Bank title and value in English and Arabic numerals	1999
For table standards, see the coin specification table.

== Banknotes ==
=== First kyat ===
No banknotes were issued for this currency.

=== Second kyat ===
The Burma State Bank issued notes for K 1/-, Ks. 5/-, Ks. 10/- and Ks. 100/- in 1944, followed by a further issue of Ks. 100/- notes in 1945.

1944–45 Series
Image		Value	Dimensions	Main Color	Description			Date of issue	Remark
Obverse	Reverse	Value	Dimensions	Main Color	Obverse	Reverse	Watermark	Date of issue	Remark
		K 1/-	109 × 63 mm	Blue	Peacock and "1 kyat" inscribed in Burmese script with rising sun in background	Mandalay Royal Palace	"Bamar" written in the Burmese language embedded in guilloché pattern	1944	
		Ks. 5/-	130 × 72 mm	Red	Peacock and "5 kyats" written in Burmese with rising sun in background	Mandalay Royal Palace	"Bamar" written in the Burmese language embedded in guilloché pattern	1944	
		Ks. 10/-	146 × 84 mm	Green	Peacock and "10 kyats" written in Burmese with rising sun in background	Mandalay Royal Palace	"Bamar" written in the Burmese language embedded in guilloché pattern	1944	
		Ks. 100/-	160 × 90 mm	Bright Orange	Peacock and "100 kyats" written in Burmese with rising sun in background	Mandalay Royal Palace	"Bamar" written in the Burmese language embedded in guilloché pattern	1944	
		Ks. 100/-	155 × 95 mm	Dark blue	Peacock and "100 kyats" written over Burmese "100" numerals with image of Head of State Ba Maw on right	Mandalay Royal Palace in center bordered by Burmese nāgas with "100" in Burmese numerals on left and right	Head of State Ba Maw's image	1945	
For table standards, see the banknote specification table.

=== Third kyat ===
A 5 kyat denomination note featuring Aung San

In 1952, the Union Bank of Burma formed a currency board which took over control of the issuing of currency and a more important change to the currency was the introduction of the decimal system in which 1 kyat was decimalised into 100 pyas.

On 12 February 1958, the Union Bank of Burma introduced the first kyat notes, in denominations of K 1/-, Ks. 5/-, Ks. 10/- and Ks. 100/-. These were very similar in design to the last series of rupee notes, issued earlier. Later on, 21 August 1958, Ks. 20/- and Ks. 50/- notes were introduced. The Ks. 50/- and Ks. 100/- notes were demonetised on 15 May 1964. This was the first of several demonetisations, ostensibly carried out with the aim of fighting black marketeering.

Ever since the Third Kyat was introduced, the Burmese currency has had no indication of the date on which the note came into circulation, nor the signature of the issuing authority.

==== 1965–1971 ====
The People's Bank of Burma took over note production in 1965 with an issue of K 1/-, Ks. 5/-, Ks. 10/- and Ks. 20/- notes.

1965 Series
Image		Value	Dimensions	Main Color	Description			Date of issue
Obverse	Reverse	Value	Dimensions	Main Color	Obverse	Reverse	Watermark	Date of issue
		K 1/-	115 × 66 mm	Purple and grey	General Aung San (1915–1947)	Inle Lake fisherman	Series of semi-circles	30 April 1965
		Ks. 5/-	150 × 70 mm	Green	General Aung San (1915–1947)	Farmer and cow	Pattern throughout paper	1965
		Ks. 10/-	159 × 81 mm	Red	General Aung San (1915–1947)	Woman picking cotton	Pattern throughout paper	1965
		Ks. 20/-	169 × 90 mm	Brown	General Aung San (1915–1947)	Cultivating tractor	Pattern throughout paper	1965

==== 1972–1988 ====
In 1972, the Union of Burma Bank took over note issuance, with notes introduced between 1972 and 1979 for K 1/-, Ks. 5/-, Ks. 10/-, Ks. 25/-, Ks. 50/- and Ks. 100/-. The notes were printed by the Security Printing Works in Wazi, Upper Burma (established c. 1972) under the technical direction of German printing firm Giesecke & Devrient.

On 3 November 1985, the Ks. 50/-, and Ks. 100/- notes were demonetized without warning, though the public was allowed to exchange limited amounts of these old notes for new ones. All other denominations then in circulation remained legal tender. On 10 November 1985, Ks. 75/- notes were introduced, the odd denomination possibly chosen because of dictator general Ne Win's predilection for numerology; the Ks. 75/- note was supposedly introduced to commemorate his 75th birthday. It was followed by the introduction of Ks. 15/- and Ks. 35/- notes on 1 August 1986.

Only two years later, on 5 September 1987, the government demonetised the Ks. 25/-, Ks. 35/-, and Ks. 75/- notes without warning or compensation, rendering some 75% of the country's currency worthless and eliminating the savings of millions of Burmese people. On 22 September 1987, banknotes for Ks. 45/- and Ks. 90/- were introduced, both of which incorporated Ne Win's favourite number, nine. The resulting economic disturbances led to serious riots and eventually a coup d'état in 1988 by General Saw Maung.

1972-1987 Series
Image		Value	Dimensions	Main Color	Description		Date of	
Obverse	Reverse	Value	Dimensions	Main Color	Obverse	Reverse	issue	issue suspension
		K 1/-	124 × 60 mm	Green	General Aung San	Weaving Loom	31 October 1972	Fall into disuse, wear and tear
		Ks. 5/-	136 × 70 mm	Blue	General Aung San	Palm Tree	31 October 1973	Fall into disuse, wear and tear
		Ks. 10/-	146 × 80 mm	Reddish Brown	General Aung San	Ceremonial Offering Bowl	30 June 1973	Fall into disuse, wear and tear
		Ks. 15/-	149 × 71 mm	Light green	General Aung San	Zawgyi wood carving	1 August 1986	Fall into disuse, wear and tear
		Ks. 25/-	155 × 90 mm	Orange	General Aung San	Pyinsarupa	3 November 1985	5 September 1987
		Ks. 35/-	155 × 74 mm	Violet	General Aung San	Standing Nat Thar	1 August 1986	5 September 1987
		Ks. 45/-	158 × 77,5 mm	Blue-green	Thakin Po Hla Gyi (1909–1943)	Oil field workers and oil drills	22 September 1987	Fall into disuse, wear and tear
		Ks. 50/-	166 × 100 mm	Yellow-Brown	General Aung San	Law Ka Nat	July 1979	3 November 1985
		Ks. 75/-	161 × 77 mm	Brown	General Aung San	Law Ka Nat	10 November 1985	5 September 1987
		Ks. 90/-	167 × 80 mm	Light green	Saya San (1876–1931)	Farmers and bullock cart	22 September 1987	Fall into disuse, wear and tear
		Ks. 100/-	176 × 110 mm	Light green	General Aung San	Saung gauk	1 August 1976	3 November 1985
For table standards, see the banknote specification table.

Banknotes of K -/50, K 1/- and Ks. 5/- are rare. Most daily transactions are rounded up to the nearest Ks.10/-.

==== 1989–present ====
Following the change of the country's name to Myanmar on 20 June 1989, new notes were issued, returning to more practical denominations. Old notes were not demonetised, but simply allowed to fall into disuse through inflation as well as wear and tear. On 1 March 1990, K 1/- notes were issued, followed by Ks.200/- notes on 27 March 1990. On 27 March 1994, notes for K -/50 (50 pyas), Ks. 20/-, Ks. 50/-, Ks. 100/-, and Ks. 500/- were issued, followed on 1 May 1995, by new Ks. 5/- and Ks. 10/- notes. Ks. 1,000/- notes were introduced in November 1998.

In 2003, as public trust eroded during the 2003 Myanmar banking crisis, rumours of another pending demonetisation swept through the country, which the junta denied. The rumours did not materialize.

In 2004, the sizes of the Ks. 200/-, Ks. 500/-, and Ks. 1,000/- notes were reduced to make all Burmese banknotes uniform in size. Larger notes were allowed to remain in circulation. K -/50, K 1/-, Ks. 5/-, Ks. 10/- and Ks. 20/- banknotes are now rarely seen, because of their low value.

===== New banknotes of higher denominations =====
On 1 October 2009, Ks. 5,000/- banknotes were issued measuring 150 x 70 mm, with images of a white elephant and the Pyidaungsu Hluttaw. This new denomination was five times larger than the previous largest denomination. Some welcomed a higher value note that reduced the number of banknotes needed for transaction. Other responses suggested widespread fear that the banknote would simply fuel inflation. This fear may have been supported by a jump in the black market exchange rates following the public announcement of the banknote.

On 9 June 2012, the Central Bank announced that Ks. 10,000/- notes would be introduced into circulation to better facilitate financial transactions in a largely cash-oriented economy. They were issued on 15 June 2012.

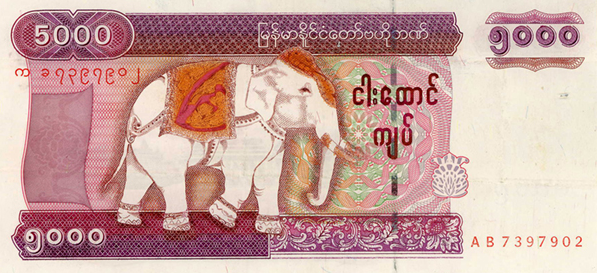
Obverse of the 2014 Ks. 5,000/- note

On 1 October 2014, the Central Bank introduced new Ks. 5,000/- banknotes with additional security features to prevent counterfeiting. The revised notes are varnished and have enhanced printing, watermarks, and a security thread. The new notes remained the same size, colour and design as the 2009 issue, which continues to be used. The new notes followed recent incidents of counterfeit Ks. 5,000/- and Ks. 10,000/- banknotes, including a 12 September 2014 seizure of Ks. 10,000/- notes and a printer allegedly used to make them.

In 2019, the Central Bank of Myanmar issued a new series of banknotes that feature a portrait of its national hero Aung San after longstanding calls to redesign the kyat. The first denomination issued for this new series was the Ks. 1,000/- banknote, which was issued into circulation on 4 January 2020, followed by the Ks. 500/- banknote on 19 July 2020.

In July 2023, a new Ks. 20,000/- banknote was announced amidst economic instability from the aftermath of the 2021 Myanmar coup d'état. The reasoning was not explained, but was likely to commemorate the birth of a white elephant and the construction of the Maravijaya Buddha statue in Naypyidaw. The banknote saw limited circulation at only select central bank branches.

Current Series
Image		Value	Dimensions	Main Color	Description			Date of issue	Remark
Obverse	Reverse	Value	Dimensions	Main Color	Obverse	Reverse	Watermark	Date of issue	Remark
		K -/50	110 × 55 mm	Obverse: Purple and orange Reverse: Multicolor	Saung gauk	Guilloché pattern	"BCM"	27 March 1994	
		K 1/-	110 × 55 mm	Orange	Bogyoke Aung San	Guilloché pattern	Bogyoke Aung San	1 March 1990	
		K 1/-	110 × 55 mm	Blue-purple	Chinthe	Boat-rowing at Kandawgyi Lake, Yangon	"BCM"	31 October 1996	
		Ks. 5/-	130 × 60 mm	Brown and blue	Chinthe	Chinlone cane ball game	Chinthe	1 May 1995	
		Ks. 5/-	130 × 60 mm	Brown and blue	Chinthe	Chinlone cane ball game	Chinthe bust over value	1997	
		Ks. 10/-	130 × 60 mm	Purple	Chinthe	A karaweik (royal regalia boat)	Chinthe	1 May 1995	
		Ks. 10/-	130 × 60 mm	Purple	Chinthe	A karaweik (royal regalia boat)	Chinthe bust over value	1997	
		Ks. 20/-	145 × 70 mm	Green	Chinthe	People's Park and Elephant Fountain, Yangon	Chinthe bust over value	27 March 1994	
		Ks. 50/-	145 × 70 mm	Orange-brown	Chinthe	Lacquerware artisan	Chinthe	27 March 1994	
		Ks. 50/-	145 × 70 mm	Orange-brown	Chinthe	Lacquerware artisan	Chinthe bust over value	1997	
		Ks. 100/-	145 × 70 mm	Blue, green, and pink	Chinthe	Temple renovation	Chinthe	27 March 1994	
		Ks. 100/-	145 × 70 mm	Blue, green, and pink	Chinthe	Temple renovation	Chinthe bust over value	27 March 1994	
		Ks. 200/-	165 × 80 mm	Dark green	Chinthe	Elephant teak-logger	Chinthe	27 March 1990; 1998	Value below watermark
		Ks. 200/-	165 × 80 mm	Dark green	Chinthe	Elephant teak-logger	Chinthe bust over value	27 March 1990; 1998	Value below watermark
		Ks. 200/-	150 × 70 mm	Dark green	Chinthe	Elephant teak-logger	Chinthe bust over value	11 December 2004	Value above watermark
		Ks. 500/-	165 × 80 mm	Purple and brown	Chinthe	A General Mahabandoola statue being painted	Chinthe	27 March 1994	Value above watermark
		Ks. 500/-	165 × 80 mm	Purple and brown	Chinthe	A General Mahabandoola statue being painted	Chinthe bust over value	27 March 1994	Value above watermark
		Ks. 500/-	150 × 70 mm	Purple and brown	Chinthe	A General Mahabandoola statue being painted	Chinthe bust over value	10 October 2004	Value below watermark
		Ks. 500/-	150 × 70 mm	Red and pink	Chinthe	Aung San	Headquarters of the Central Bank of Myanmar in Naypyidaw	19 July 2020	Value below watermark
		Ks. 1,000/-	165 × 80 mm	Green and purple	Chinthe	Ministry of Finance and Revenue	Chinthe	November 1998	Value above watermark
		Ks. 1,000/-	165 × 80 mm	Green and purple	Chinthe	Ministry of Finance and Revenue	Chinthe bust over value	November 1998	Value above watermark
		Ks. 1,000/-	150 × 70 mm	Green and purple	Chinthe	Ministry of Finance and Revenue	Chinthe bust over value	11 October 2004	Value below watermark
		Ks. 1,000/-	150 × 70 mm	Blue	Aung San	Pyidaungsu Hluttaw (Assembly of the Union) legislature buildings in Zeya Theddhi Ward of Naypyidaw	Aung San bust over value	4 January 2020	Value above watermark
		Ks. 5,000/-	150 × 70 mm	Orange and pink	White elephant	Pyidaungsu Hluttaw (Assembly of the Union) legislature buildings in Zeya Theddhi Ward of Naypyidaw	Elephant profile over value	1 October 2009	Value above watermark
		Ks. 10,000/-	150 × 70 mm	Blue, red, purple, green, brown and yellow	Modified State Seal of Myanmar (Features a lotus and a pair of elephants, instead of a star, a pair of Chinthe lion and the Armiger as in the Original State Seal)	Mandalay Royal Palace Moat	Lotus Flower profile over value	15 June 2012	Value above watermark
		Ks. 20,000/-	150 × 70 mm	Green and yellow	White elephant	Bridges over the Irrawaddy River at Mandalay (back: Ava bridge; front: Yadanbon bridge)	Elephant profile over value	31 July 2023	Value above watermark

=== Foreign exchange certificates ===
In 1993, Myanmar began issuing foreign exchange certificates (FEC) denominated in US dollars in denominations of $1, $5, $10, and $20. These were exchanged at a parity ratio with and were valued separately from the regular kyat. Conversion of foreign currency into kyats was made illegal as exchange rates were set artificially high. During much of this period, two valuations of the Myanmar kyat emerged: the official rate, which averaged around Ks. 6/- = US$1, and the black market rate which averaged tens of times higher. Foreign visitors to Myanmar could only transact currency in FEC's or could only obtain kyats at the artificially high official rates. Illegal peddlers often had to be sought out to exchange currency.

On 1 April 2012, the Government of Myanmar began allowing for a managed float of the kyat and legalised the use and exchange of foreign currencies in Myanmar to better reflect the global exchange rates, attract investment, and to weaken the black markets. On 20 March 2013, the government announced the discontinuation and gradual withdrawal of FEC's.

=== Redesign proposal ===
Following the removal of General Aung San's portraits from the banknotes of the Burmese kyat in 1987, there have been calls by both the public and opposition politicians to reinstate them, as well as criticizing the use of animals on banknotes in circulation. Writer Nyi Maung notes that foreign countries use portraits of their national leaders and heroes on their banknotes, such as Thailand, and encourages the reinstatement of General Aung San's portrait on the kyat to remember his legacy. In October 2017, a proposal was submitted by National League for Democracy MP Aung Khin Win to debate the issue in the Pyithu Hluttaw.

While the Central Bank of Myanmar argues that the cost of reprinting new notes bearing the General's portrait would be monumental considering Myanmar's current economic situation, Aung Khin Win stated that new notes would only be reprinted to replace damaged notes or in the release of new denominations or size of kyat banknotes.

The debate on this issue took place in the Pyithu Hluttaw on 17 November 2017. The proposal was wholly rejected by the military bloc, but it was passed with 286 votes for, and 109 against.

==== 2020 redesign ====
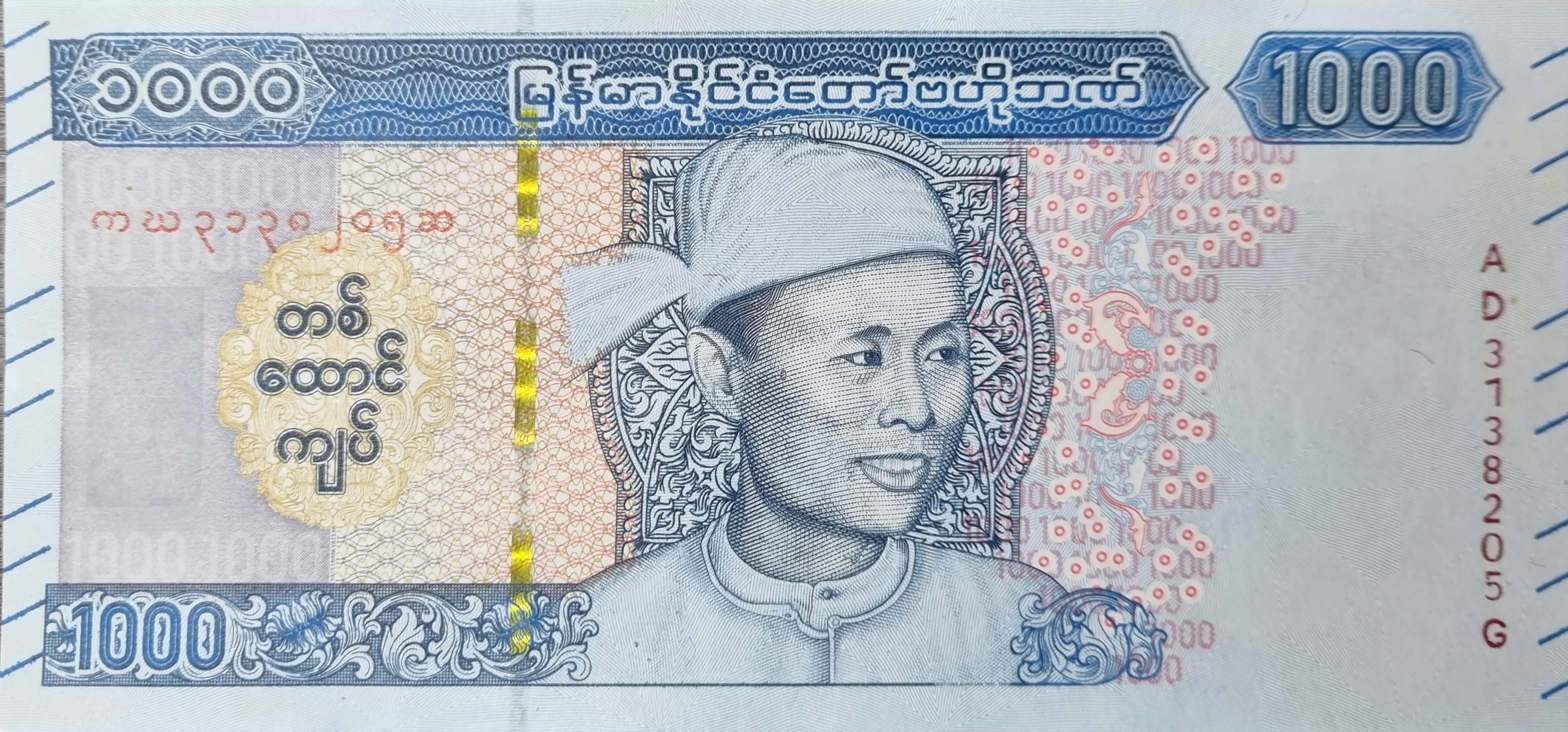
2020 redesign of the Myanmar Ks. 1,000/- note

On 21 December 2019, the Central Bank of Myanmar announced that in conjunction with the 72nd anniversary of Myanmar's independence, it would begin circulating Ks. 1,000/- notes bearing the portrait of General Aung San. The bank notes were released to the public on 4 January 2020, marking the return of the national icon's image to the country's currency for the first time in thirty years.

On 18 June 2020, the Central Bank of Myanmar announced that it would begin circulating Ks. 500/- notes bearing the portrait of General Aung San on 19 July 2020, in conjunction with the 73rd anniversary of Martyr's Day.

Both the Ks. 500/- and Ks. 1,000/- banknotes bearing Aung San's portrait, are in concurrent circulation with the existing chinthe portrait bank notes, which will continue to remain in legal tender.
