= State seal law of Myanmar =

နိုင်ငံတော်အထိမ်းအမှတ်တံဆိပ်ဥပဒေကို ပြင်ဆင်သည့်ဥပဒေ The Law Amending the State Seal Law

National Defense and Security Council
- Long title: နိုင်ငံတော်အထိမ်းအမှတ်တံဆိပ်ဥပဒေကိုပြင်ဆင်သည့်ဥပဒေ (အမျိုးသားကာကွယ်ရေးနှင့်လုံခြုံရေးကောင်စီဥပဒေအမှတ် ၂ / ၂၀၂၅) The Law Amending The State Seal Law (The National Defense and Security Council Law No. 2/2025)
- Territorial extent: Myanmar
- Enacted: 11 August 2025
- Assented to: 11 August 2025
- Commenced: 11 August 2025

Amends
- State Seal Law (2010)
- Status: In force

The State Seal Law of Myanmar has undergone three amendments. The first law was enacted in 1974 after the coming into force of the socialist constitution. In 2010, a new law was enacted and repealed the 1974 law. Most recently, in August 2025, a minor amendment was made.

== History ==
No.	Law Name	Law Number	Enacter
1.	The State Seal Law	1974, Pyithu Hluttaw Law No. 2.	Pyithu Hluttaw, Council of State
2.	The State Seal Law	State Peace and Development Council Law No. 9/2010	State Peace and Development Council
3.	The Law Amending the State Seal Law	National Defense and Security Council Law No. 2/2025	National Defense and Security Council

=== 1974 Law ===
Legislated by Pyithu Hluttaw, The State Seal Law (Burmese: နိုင်ငံတော်အထိမ်းအမှတ်တံဆိပ်ဥပဒေ) was promulgated in 1974 along with the State Seal Rules (Burmese: နိုင်ငံတော်အထိမ်းအမှတ်တံဆိပ်နည်းဥပဒေများ) by the Council of State on 30 March 1974. The Council of Ministers issued the Order No. 16 on 9 October 1974, officially giving the Specification of the Symbols Included in the State Seal and Detailed Explanation and Description Concerning the Symbols Included in the State Seal (Burmese: နိုင်ငံတော်အထိမ်းအမှတ်တံဆိပ်ပါ အမှတ်အသားများ အချိုးအစားသတ်မှတ်ပုံ နိုင်ငံတော်အထိမ်းအမှတ်တံဆိပ်ပါ အမှတ်အသားများအချိုးအစားသတ်မှတ်ချက်နှင့် ပတ်သက်၍၊ အသေးစိတ်ရှင်းလင်းဖေါ်ပြချက်များ).

=== 2010 Law ===
On 21 October 2010, the State Peace and Development Council (SPDC) promulgated the State Seal Law (Burmese: နိုင်ငံတော်အထိမ်းအမှတ်တံဆိပ်ဥပဒေ), also translated to English as the Union Seal Law, together with the State Seal Rules (Burmese: နိုင်ငံတော်အထိမ်းအမှတ်တံဆိပ်နည်းဥပဒေများ), repealing the old ones.

=== 2025 Amendment ===
On 11 August 2025, the National Defense and Security Council (NDSC) promulgated the Law Amending the State Seal Law (Burmese: နိုင်ငံတော်အထိမ်းအမှတ်တံဆိပ်ဥပဒေကိုပြင်ဆင်သည့်ဥပဒေ).

Main Amendment Points:

- Article (3) was revised to more precisely describe the meanings of the symbols within the seal.
- In Article (6), the clause "shall not be destroyed or altered" was expanded to include "attempting to alter, altering, or destroying". This change broadened the scope of punishable offenses and their consequences.

== State Symbols (Restriction of Celebration) Act, 1954 ==
No.	Law Name	Law Number	Enacter
1.	The State Symbols (Restriction of Celebration) Act	1954, Act No. 47.	Union Parliament
2.	The Law Amending the State Symbols (Restriction of Celebration) Act, 1954	The Pyidaungsu Hluttaw Law No.12, 2015	Pyidaungsu Hluttaw

The State Symbols (Restriction of Celebration) Act (Burmese: နိုင်ငံတော်အထိမ်းအမှတ်များ(ဆင်ယင်ပြသမှုကန့်သတ်ရေး)အက်ဥပဒေ) was enacted on 9 October 1954. Concerning with the flags, emblems and coats of arms of Burma and other countries, it was the only law which protected the State Seal before the enactment of the State Seal Law. On 17 May 2015, the Pyidaungsu Hluttaw amended it by enacting the Law Amending the State Symbols (Restriction of Celebration) Act, 1954 (Burmese: ၁၉၅၄ ခုနှစ်၊ နိုင်ငံတော်အထိမ်းအမှတ်များ(ဆင်ယင်ပြသမှုကန့်သတ်ရေး) အက်ဥပဒေကိုပြင်ဆင် သည့်ဥပဒေ).

== See also ==
- State Seal of Myanmar
