= State Seal of Myanmar =

State Seal of the Republic of the Union of Myanmar
- Armiger: Government of the Republic of the Union of Myanmar
- Adopted: 31 January 2011 (modified on 11 August 2025)
- Crest: A mullet Or
- Shield: Gules, a map of Myanmar Or surrounded by sprigs of Eugenia of the same
- Supporters: Two lion sejant Or
- Motto: ပြည်ထောင်စု သမ္မတ မြန်မာနိုင်ငံတော် (literally: "Union "President" "State of Myanmar"; officially: "Republic of the Union of Myanmar")
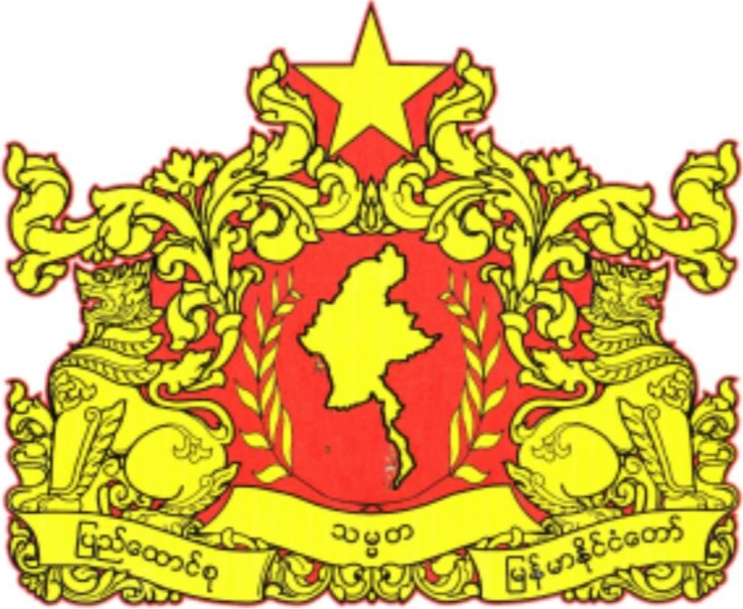
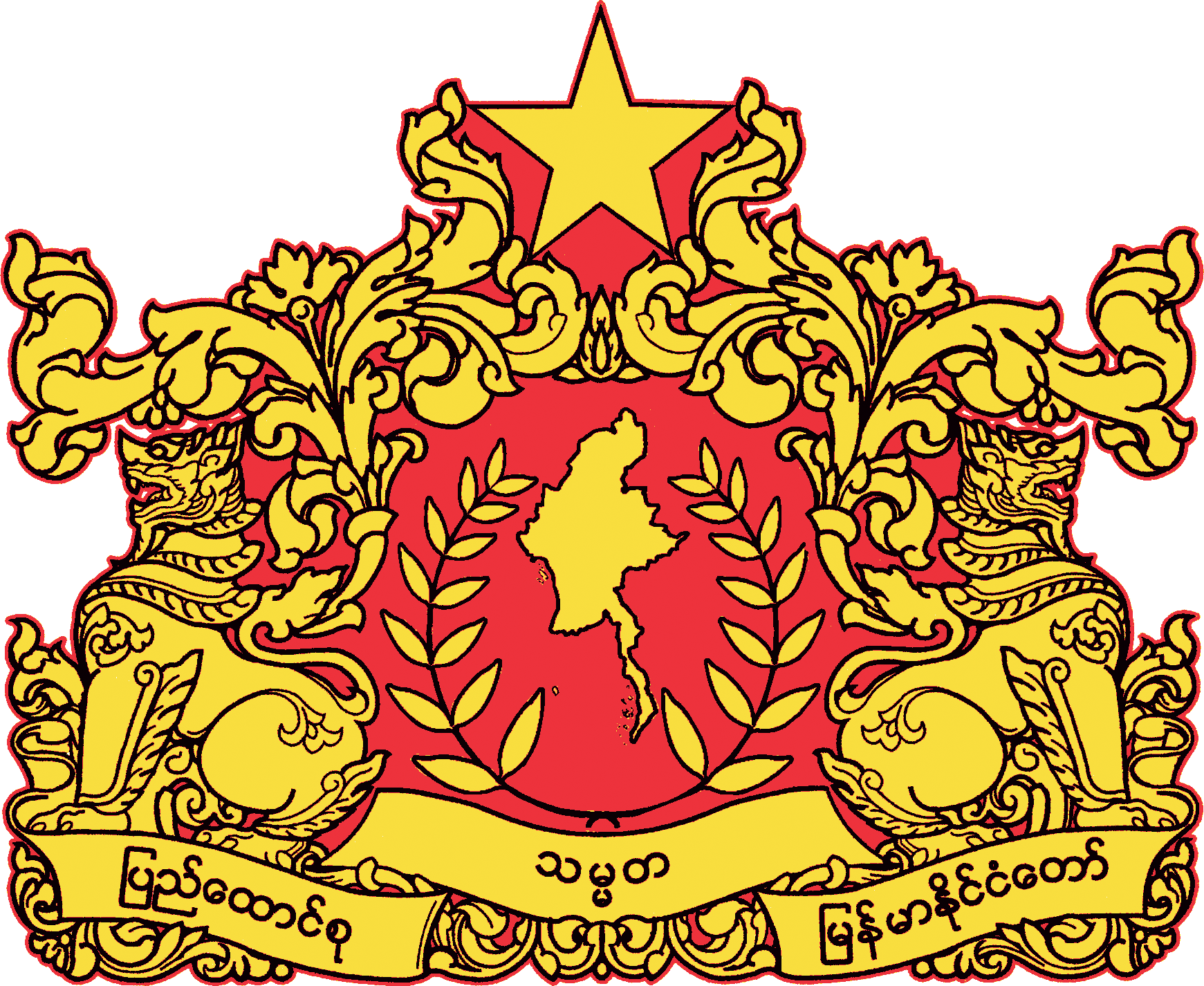
- Earlier version: State Seal as shown in the constitution Variant Variant, 2016-2025
- Designer: Unknown

The State Seal of the Republic of the Union of Myanmar (Burmese: ပြည်ထောင်စုသမ္မတမြန်မာနိုင်ငံတော် နိုင်ငံတော်အထိမ်းအမှတ်တံဆိပ်) is the national emblem used in all official government documents, including publications. As the seal is an official symbol, State Seal Law and State Seal Rules were established regarding appropriate usage of it. The current layout of the state seal of Myanmar was partially inspired by that of the coat of arms of the United Kingdom, and, since Myanmar's independence from Great Britain, it has changed three times.

== Description and symbolism ==
- (a) In the center of the State Seal is the map of the Republic of the Union of Myanmar. On each side of the map is a sprig of Eugenia with 14 leaves. The map of the country represents the territorial shape of the Republic of the Union of Myanmar, and the sprigs of Eugenia represent a sign of victory.
- (b) On either side of the sprigs Eugenia is an artistically rendered Burmese royal lion (Chinthe). The lion on the left faces to the left, and the lion on the right faces to the right. The two lions signify sovereignty, courage, diligence, and the suppression of all dangers, great and small, with equal effort. The placement of the two lions guarding either side of the map of the country signifies the protection of the Republic of the Union of Myanmar.
- (c) The inscription "Republic of the Union of Myanmar" is displayed on a ribbon at the bottom of the State Seal. The expression "Union" is placed under the lion on the left, the expression "Republic" is in the center under the map of the Republic of the Union of Myanmar, and the expression "Myanmar" are placed under the lion on the right.
- (d) At the top of the State Seal, a five-pointed star points directly upwards. Just as a star shines in the sky with its own natural light, the star signifies that Myanmar stands as a sovereign and independent nation.
- (e) On each side of the star are traditional Burmese floral designs (Kanote). These floral branches signify the high level of Myanmar's cultural heritage and its existence with its own culture.
- (f) The State Seal is depicted in golden yellow on a red background, and the outlines of the seal are drawn in black. The color red signifies courage and decisiveness, while the golden-yellow color signifies that which is cherished and valued.
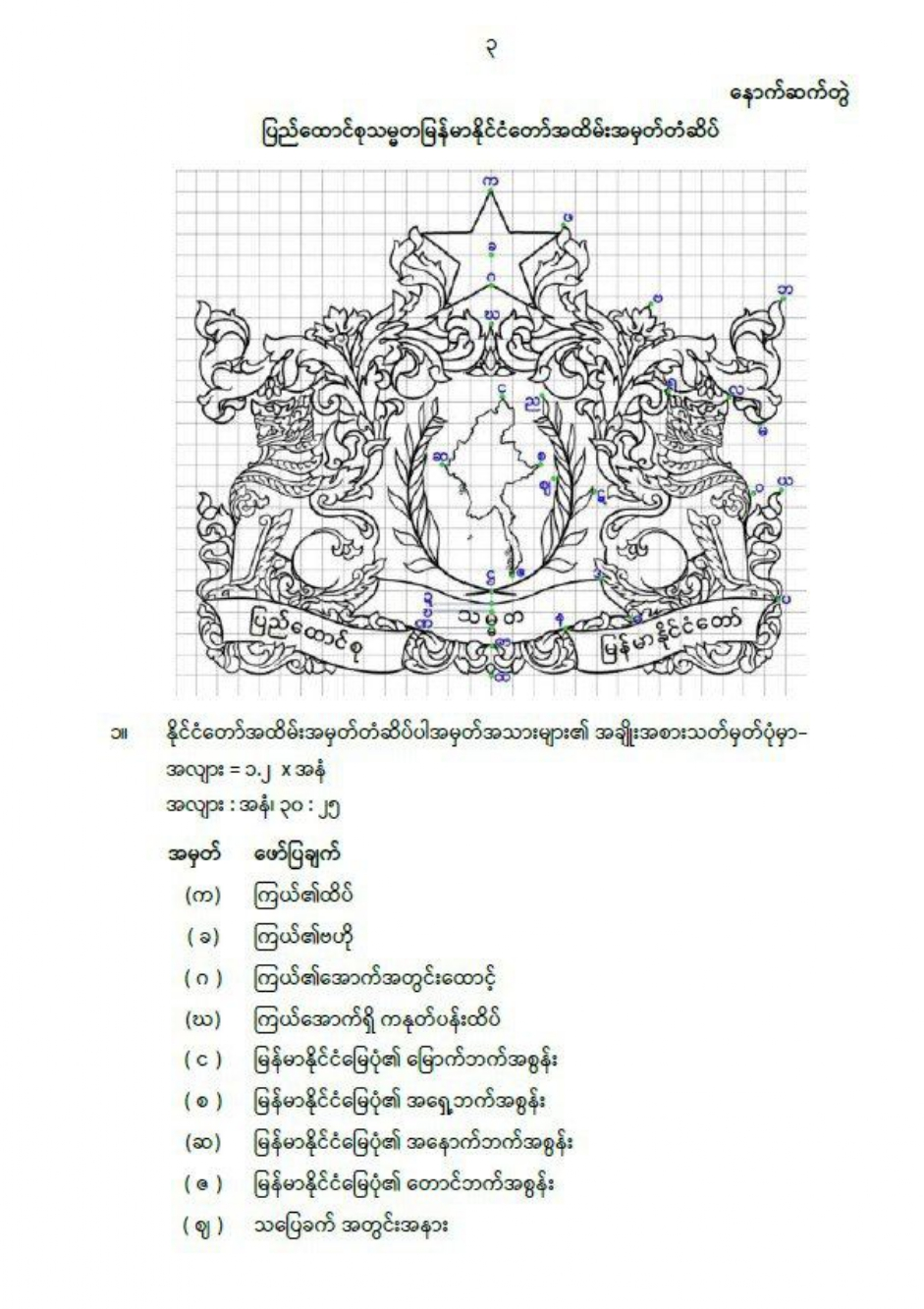
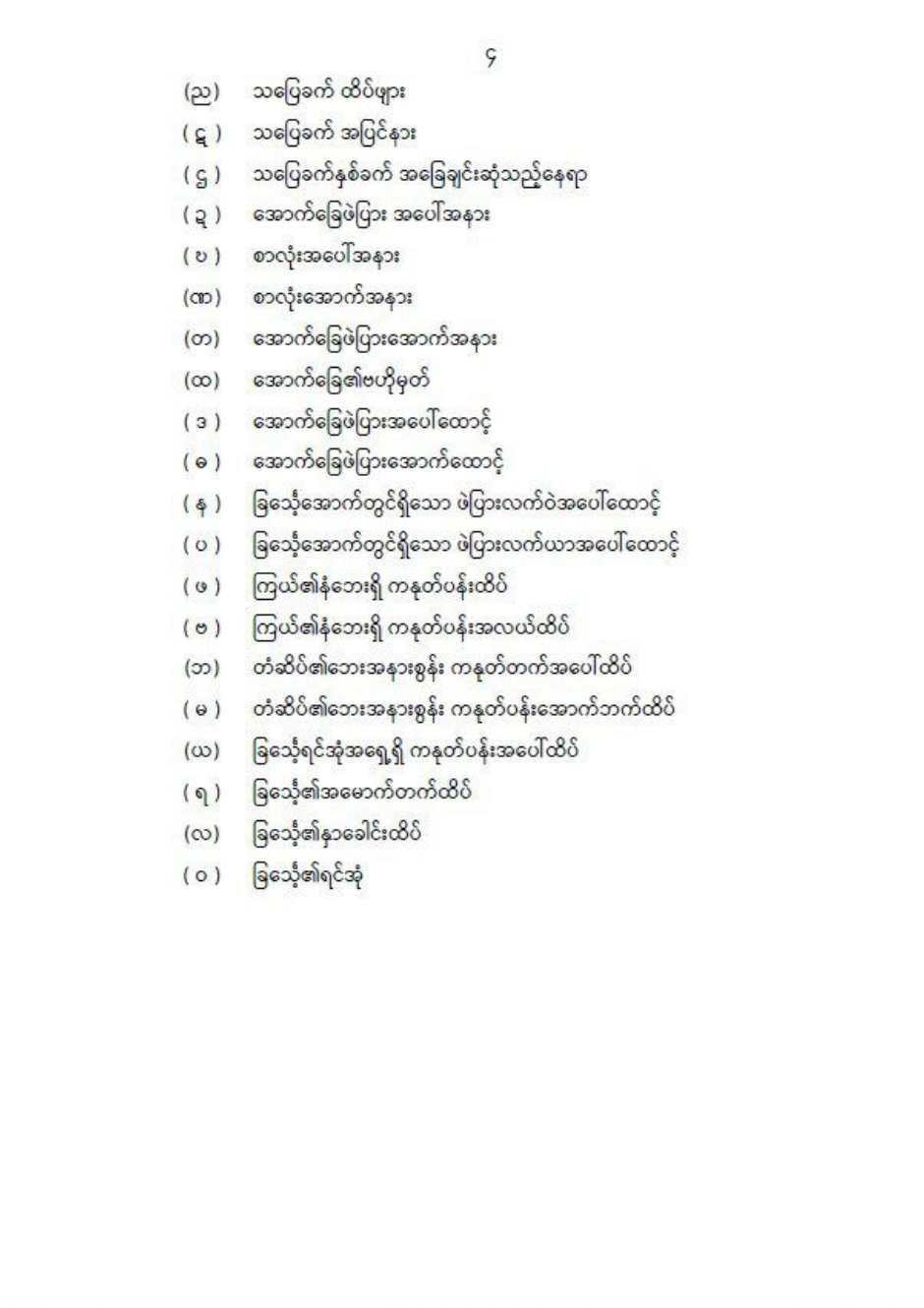
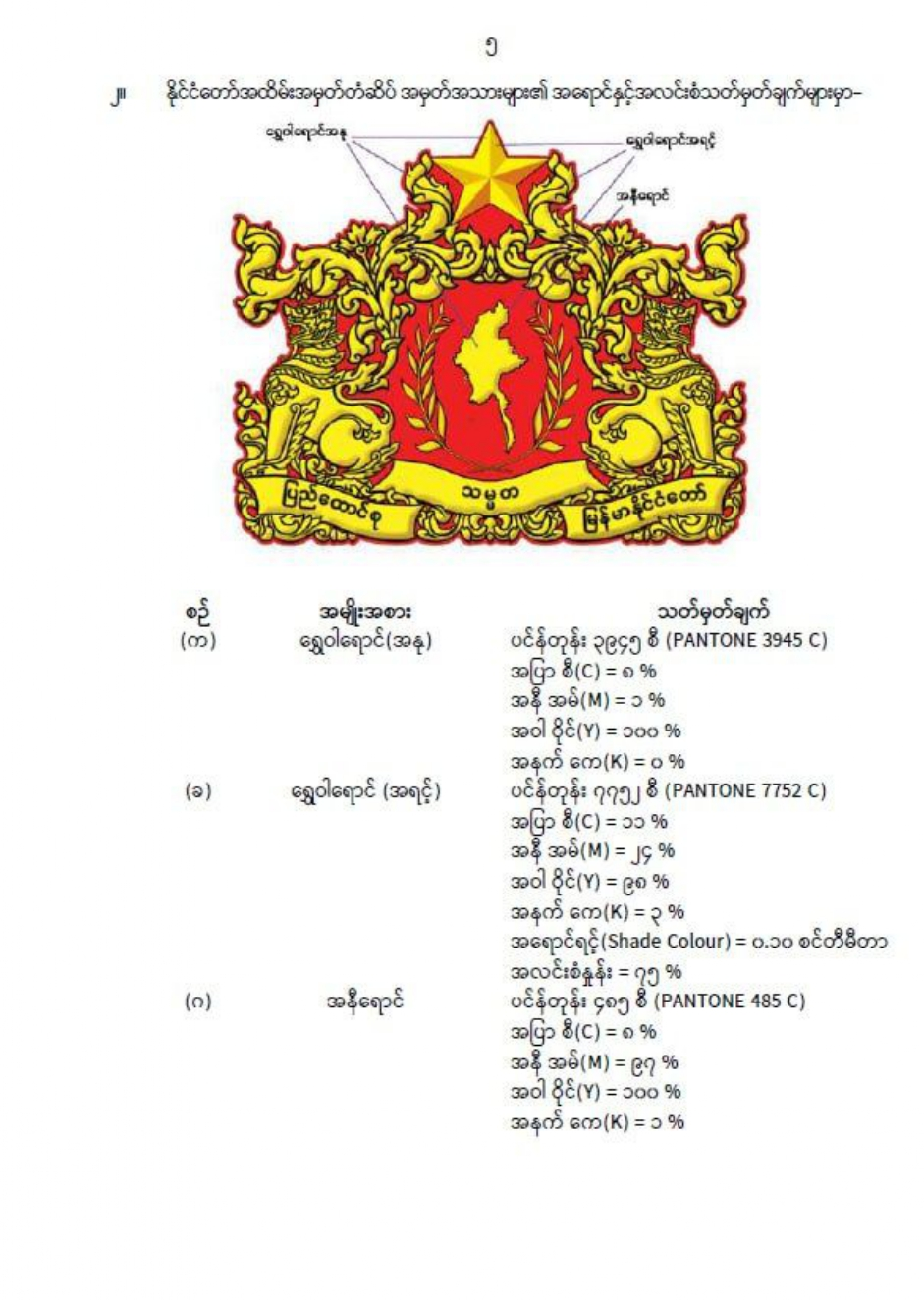
Appendix of the Law Amending the State Seal Law (2025)

== Usage ==
The State seal can be used for the following:

- The Presidential Palace.
- In/on the vehicles of the President.
- Central Parliament Buildings (Pyidaungsu Hluttaw, Pyithu Hluttaw, and Amyotha Hluttaw), Union-level government offices, State and Regional Hluttaw Buildings, Offices of State and Region Government, Self-Administered Zones and Divisions.
- Ministries and their dependent agencies' offices, courts, and organizations or departments permitted to do so by the Union Government.
- Embassies, consulates, and other representations.
- Objects used in State Receptions.
- Banknotes and stamps.
- Organizations given permission by the President.
- Official documents of Central Parliaments and State & Region, the Union Government and ministries, the State, Region and SAZ and SAD Governments, the organizations and departments given permission by the Union Government.
- State meetings and ceremonies.

== History ==
=== Colonial Era ===
==== British colonial rule in Burma (1886–1942, 1945–1948) ====
Coat of arms of the United Kingdom (1886 version)
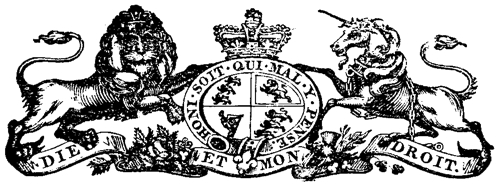
- Armiger: British rule in Burma
- Adopted: 1886
- Relinquished: 1948
- Crest: A royal crown proper
- Shield: Quarterly, I and IV Gules, three lions passant guardant in pale Or langued and armed Azure. II Or a lion rampant Gules armed and langued Azure within a double tressure flory-counter-flory Gules. III Azure a harp Or stringed Argent.
- Supporters: On the dexter a lion rampant guardant Or langued and armed Gules, royally crowned Proper. On the sinister a Unicorn rampant Argent armed crined and unguled Or, and gorged with a Coronet composed of crosses patee and fleurs-de-lis, a chain affixed thereto passing through the forelegs and reflexed over the back Or
- Motto: French: Dieu et mon droit, lit. 'God and my right'
- Order: Order of the Garter

Badge of Burma (1939–1941, 1945–1948)

After being annexed by the British Empire, the royal coat of arms of the United Kingdom was adopted. After Burma was separated from India, the green peacock on a yellow was adopted as the national symbol and badge of Burma, in 1939. But the coat of arms was still the coat of arms of United Kingdom. This coat of arms would later serve as the basis for the design of the State Seal of the newly independent Union of Burma.

=== Japanese Era ===
==== State of Burma (1943–1945) ====
State Seal of the State of Burma (1943–1945)

The State of Burma, a Japanese puppet state, adopted a circular State seal bearing a stylized, golden peacock in 1943.

=== First design of the State Seal ===
==== (1948–1974) ====
State Seal of the Union of Burma
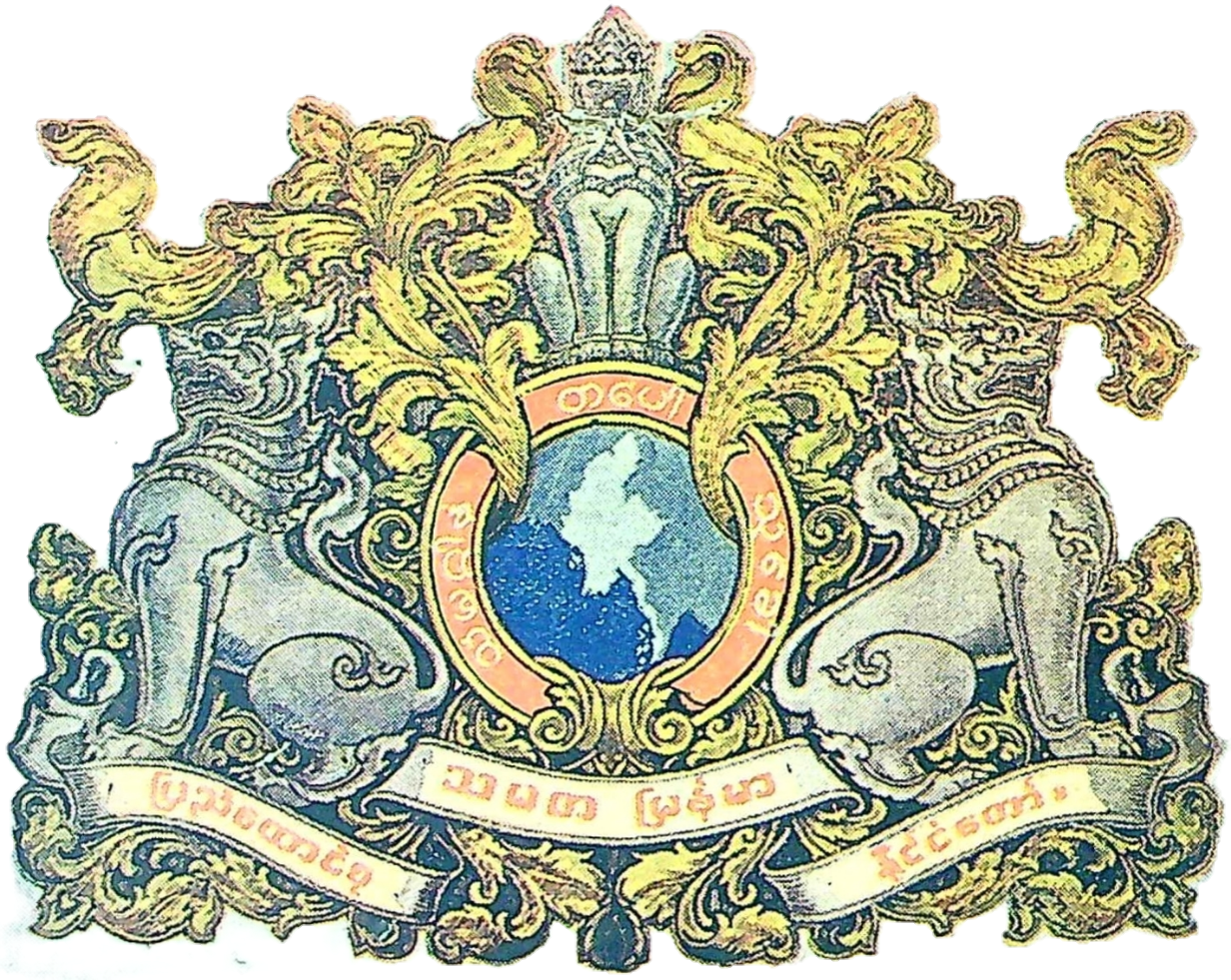
- Armiger: Union Government of the Union of Burma (1948–1962); Revolutionary Government of the Union of Burma (1962–1974)
- Adopted: 4 January 1948
- Relinquished: 3 January 1974
- Crest: A lion sejant Argent
- Shield: Azure, a map of Myanmar Argent between two areas, surrounded by a circle Gules that bears the State motto: သမဂ္ဂါနံ တပေါ သုခေါ
- Supporters: Two lion sejant Argent
- Motto: သမဂ္ဂါနံ တပေါ သုခေါ (samaggānaṃ topo sukho) ပြည်ထောင်စု သမတ-မြန်မာ နိုင်ငံတော်။ (• literally, "Union" "President-Myanmar" "State"; • formally, "Union of the Republic of Burma")
- Designer: Unknown

The first design of the State Seal of Burma, adopted by the Constituent Assembly of Burma in 1947, contained the Burmese text ပြည်ထောင်စု သမတမြန်မာ နိုင်ငံတော်။ on the banner, which means "Republic of Union of Myanmar" (the same as the text in the current State Seal except the spelling of the word that mean President or Republic: သမတ), as well as three lions. Additionally, there was a circle surrounding the map of the country containing Verse 194 of the Buddhavagga in the Dhammapada in Pali: သမဂ္ဂါနံ တပေါ သုခေါ (samaggānaṃ tapo sukho), which translates to "Happy is the practice of those in harmony." It was adopted at the independence of the country on 4 January 1948.

==== Second design of the State Seal (1974–1988) ====
State Seal of the Socialist Republic of the Union of Burma
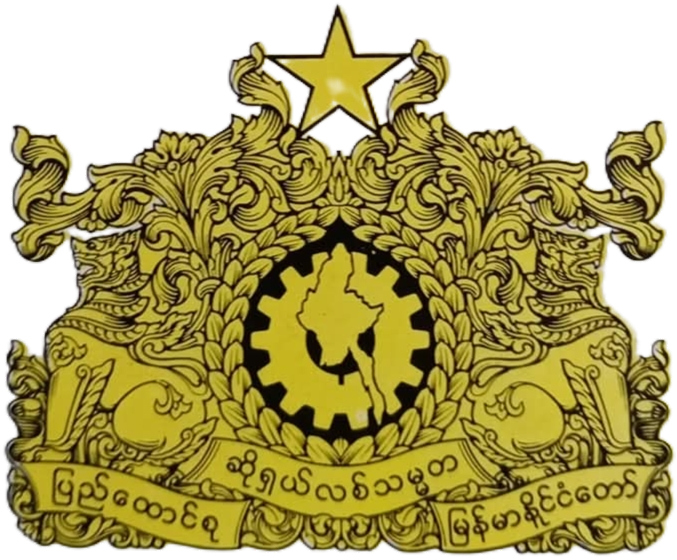

Versions
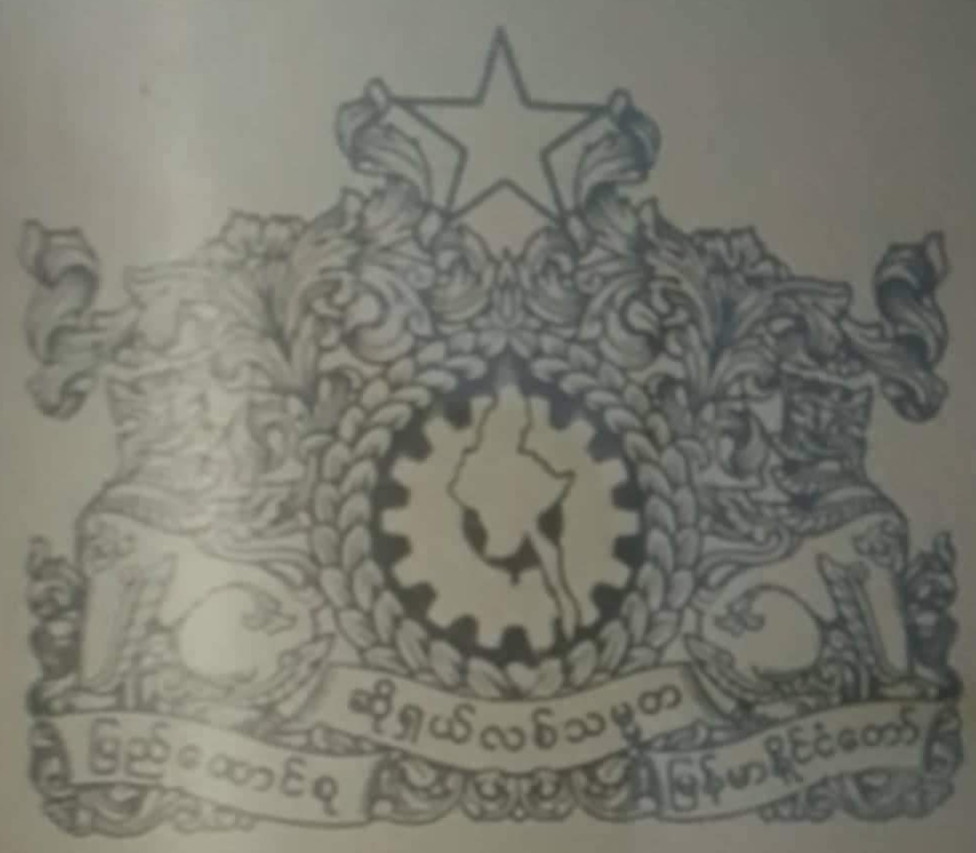
- in the 1974 Constitution
- Armiger: Government of the Socialist Republic of the Union of Burma
- Adopted: 3 January 1974
- Relinquished: 19 October 1988
- Crest: A mullet Or
- Shield: Sable, a map of Myanmar Or surrounded by a pinion Or which is also surrounded by paddy ears Or
- Supporters: Two lion sejant Or
- Motto: ပြည်ထောင်စု ဆိုရှယ်လစ်သမ္မတ မြန်မာနိုင်ငံတော် (• literally, "Union" "Socialist President" "State of Myanmar"; • formally, "Socialist Republic of the Union of Burma")
- Designer: Mya Thaung

The 1974 Constitution of the Socialist Republic of the Union of Burma adopted a new State Seal with Socialist symbols : a pinion (cogwheel) with 14 teeth, surrounding the map of Myanmar, surrounded by two paddy ears, the two artistic Burmese lions besides the branches: The left lion facing to the left and the right lion facing to the right, The words ပြည်ထောင်စု ဆိုရှယ်လစ်သမ္မတ မြန်မာနိုင်ငံတော်, which means "Socialist Republic of the Union of Myanmar", on the ribbon banner at the bottom. It was adopted together with the new State flag and the 1974 constitution on 3 January 1974. The original publications of 1974 constitution shows the State flag with full colours, but it shows the State seal only in white and black. But in the official usage, it is always yellow and black. The e-book version of the 1974 constitution from Myanmar Law Information System shows the blue State seal from Wikipedia in place of the State seal.

==== SLORC Modification (1988–2011) ====
State Seal of the Union of Myanmar
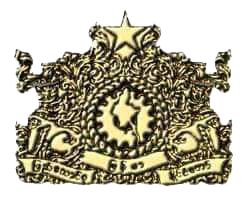
- Armiger: State Law and Order Restoration Council (1988–1997); State Peace and Development Council (1997–2011)
- Adopted: 19 October 1988
- Relinquished: 31 January 2011
- Crest: A mullet Or
- Shield: Sable, a map of Myanmar Or surrounded by a pinion Or which is also surrounded by paddy ears Or
- Supporters: Two lion sejant Or
- Motto: ပြည်ထောင်စု မြန်မာ နိုင်ငံတော် (• literally, "Union" "Myanmar" "State"; • officially, "Union of Myanmar")
- Designer: Mya Thaung

On 19 October 1988, the State Law and Order Restoration Council enacted a law which replaces the expression "Socialist Republic of the Union of Myanmar" with the expression "Union of Myanmar". The State Seal was modified as the country name in State Seal Law had been replaced: the words ဆိုရှယ်လစ်သမ္မတ ("Socialist Republic") were removed.

==== Third design of the State Seal (2011-2025) ====
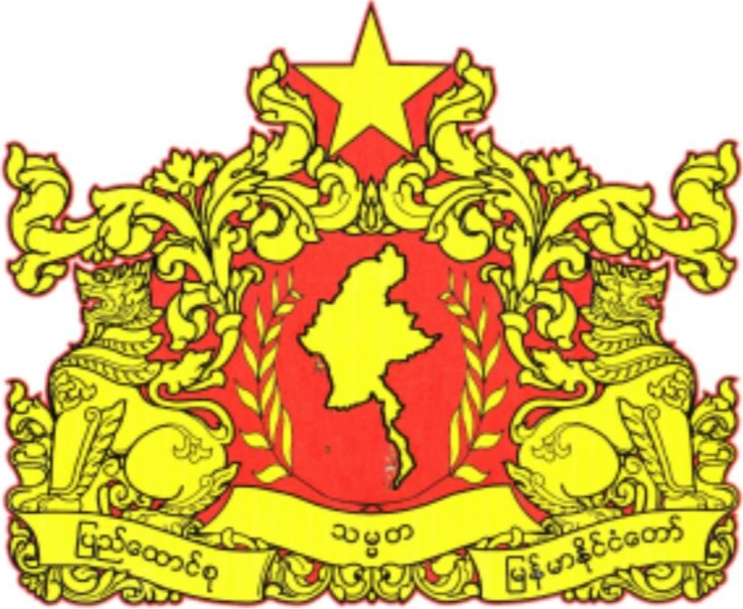
Constitutional version

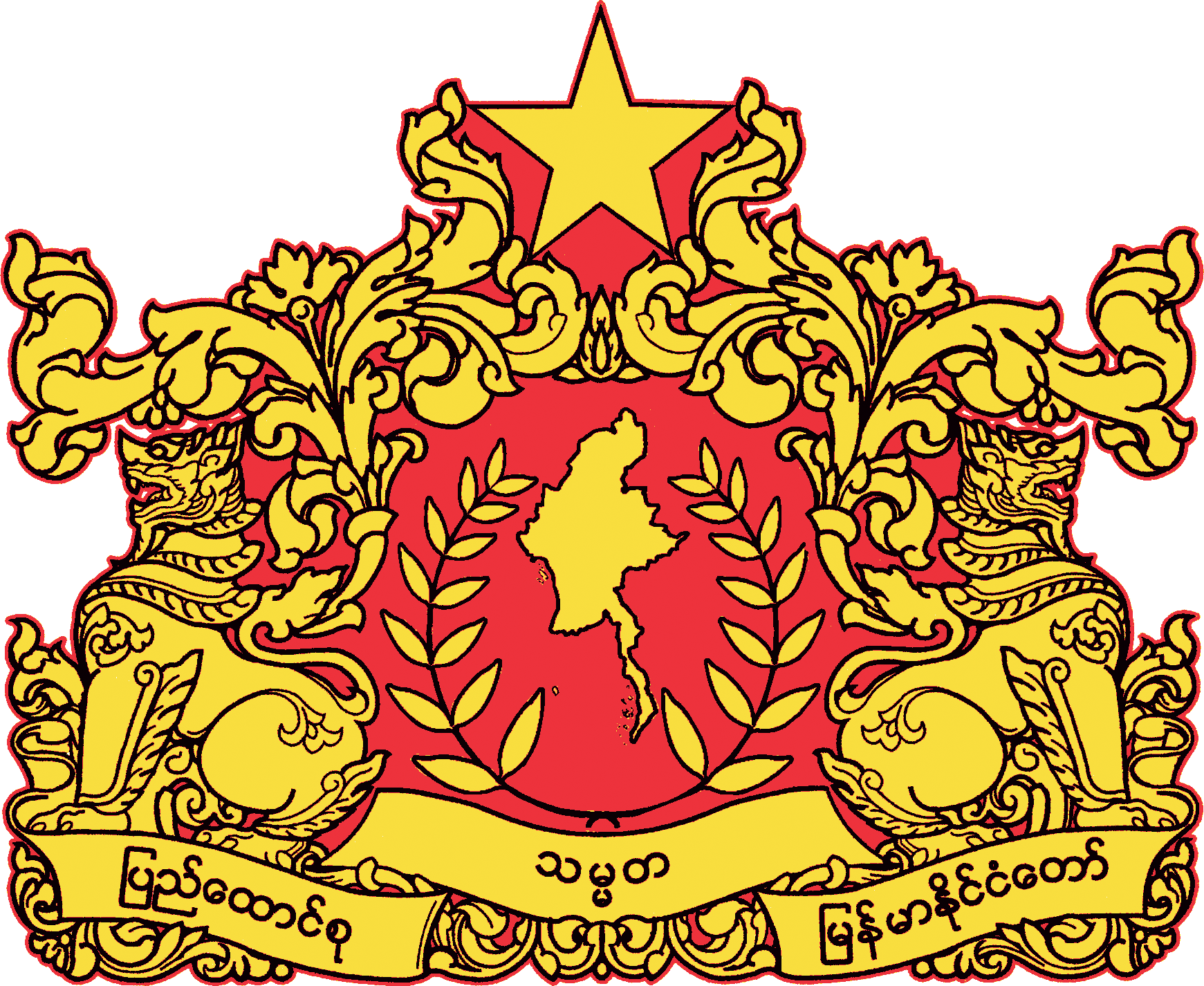
Variant colour

Variant version

In 2008, the Constitution of the Republic of the Union of Myanmar for Burma was approved by a referendum. In this new constitution, changes have been made to the State Seal. The new State Seal uses the colours red and gold/yellow. Also, the pinion and paddy ears have been removed and replaced with Eugenia sprigs and the words on the ribbon have been changed to ပြည်ထောင်စု သမ္မတ မြန်မာနိုင်ငံတော် which translates "Republic of the Union of Myanmar" . The new Laws and Principles for State Seal were passed on 21 October 2010 (but were not enforced immediately) and the new State Seal was displayed on the television on that day's afternoon. But the new state seal had not been adopted yet until 2011. It was adopted on the day the 2008 Constitution came into force, on 31 January 2011.

==== 2025 modification (current version) ====

The National Defence and Security Council (NDSC) enacted the Law Amending the State Seal Law on 11 August 2025. The amendment revises the provisions of Section 3, which define the symbols and meanings of the State Seal.

== Descriptions and symbolisms of historical State Seals ==
=== 1948 State Seal ===
The official description and symbolism was recorded at the meeting of the Constituent Assembly of Burma on 1 August 1947 which approved and adopted the State Flag and the State Seal for the then-future Burma.

==== Marks ====
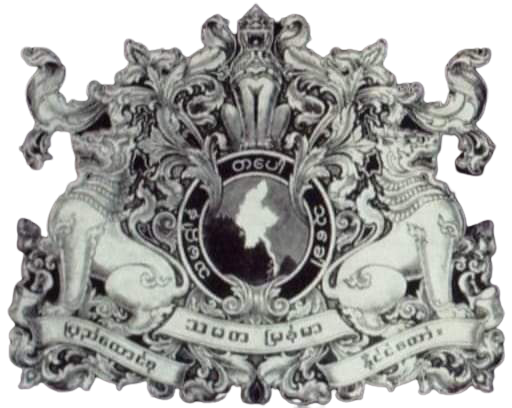

1. The map of Myanmar with land and water borders is in the centre.
2. A circular ribbon bearing the State Motto "သမဂ္ဂါနံ တပေါ သုခေါ" (in Pāḷi, "samaggānaṃ tapo sukho" meaning "The ardent practice of those in harmony is the cause of happiness", from Verse 194 of the Buddhavagga in the Dhammapada) surrounds the map.
3. Three kesarājā lions, decorated with traditional floral arabesques in the Myanmar way, are protecting and defending. One lion on the top, one lion on the left side and one lion on the right side of the circular ribbon. The lion on the top faces straightly, the lion on the left side faces towards the left and the lion on the right side faces towards the right.
4. The expression "ပြည်ထောင်စု သမတ မြန်မာ နိုင်ငံတော်။" meaning "Republic of the Union of Myanmar." is inscribed on the ribbon at the foot of the State Seal. The expression "ပြည်ထောင်စု" is placed under the left lion, the expression "သမတ မြန်မာ"is placed at the centre under the circular ribbon, the expression "နိုင်ငံတော်" is placed under the right lion.

==== Symbolism ====
1. In the traditional view of ancient sages, the nature of lion gives the natures of bravery, diligence, extinguishing any size of danger with the same effort, purity and virtue. Such characteristics can make Myanmar honoured and they are the ones that Myanmar citizens should imitate.
2. Being surrounded by three lions means defending and protecting Myanmar. In the view of secular astrology, divisible by three means the end of all evil events.
3. Lion and Myanmar are regarded as compatible paring according to secular astrology.
4. Lion and traditional floral arabesques are inserted and decorated, so it is assumed as giving respect to an ancient traditional Myanmar culture appropriate for the modern Union of Myanmar.
5. The State Motto is the reminder to build up unity and harmony forever.

=== 1974 State Seal ===
The Council of Ministers of the Socialist Republic of the Union of Burma issued the Order No. 16 with the title "Specification of the Symbols Included in the State Seal and Detailed Explanations and Descriptions Concerning the Symbols Included in the State Seal" (Burmese: နိုင်ငံတော်အထိမ်းအမှတ်တံဆိပ်ပါ အမှတ်အသားများ အချိုးအစားသတ်မှတ်ပုံ နိုင်ငံတော်အထိမ်းအမှတ်တံဆိပ်ပါ အမှတ်အသားများအချိုးအစားသတ်မှတ်ချက်နှင့် ပတ်သက်၍၊ အသေးစိတ်ရှင်းလင်းဖေါ်ပြချက်များ) on 9 October 1974, officially giving the descriptions and meanings of the symbols.

==== Specifications ====
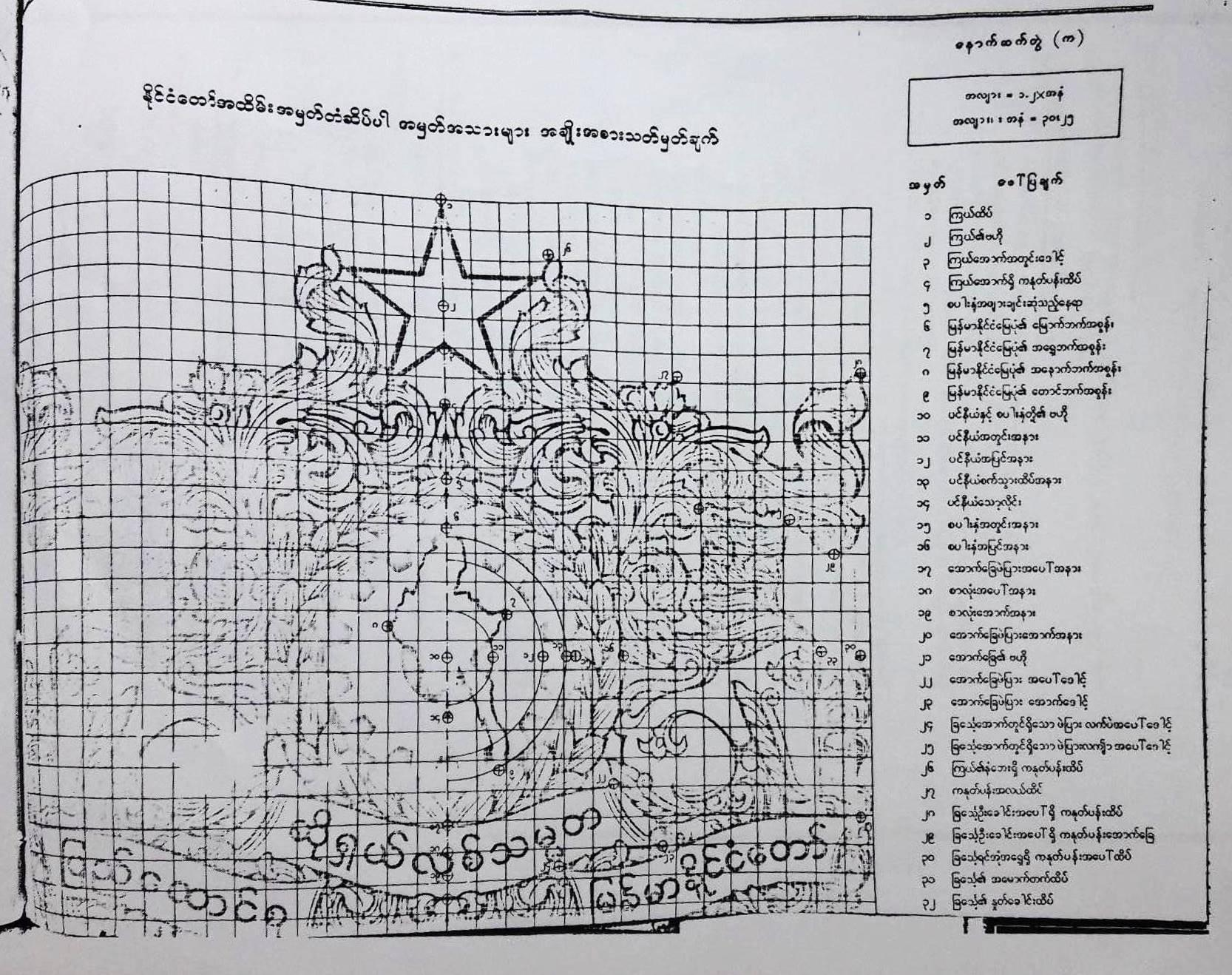
Appendix (A) of Order 16, Council of Ministers

==== Marks ====
1. At the top of the State Seal is a star with five vertices.
2. At the center of the State Seal is a pinion. It has fourteen teeth of equal size. On the pinion is the map of Myanmar. The pinion is encircled with two ears of paddy.
3. The key line of the pinion is at the exact middle of its bottom.
4. The two ears of paddy have their bottoms meet with each other as well as their tops meet with each other. Each ear of paddy has 13 pairs of 2 grains. There is only one grain at the top. There is one grain at the bottom where the two ears of paddy meet. There are 55 grains of paddy in total.
5. The northernmost end of the map of Myanmar on the pinion is in the middle of the two topmost teeth, and the southernmost end of the map of Myanmar is in the middle of the first and the second bottommost teeth on the left.
6. There is an artistic Myanmar lion on each side of the ears of paddy. The lion on the left side faces towards the left and the lion on the right side faces towards the right.
7. The lions have 3 crests and 3 manes.
8. The expression "the Socialist Republic of the Union of Myanmar" is inscribed on the ribbon at the foot. The expression "the Union" is placed under the left lion, the expression "Myanmar" is placed under the right lion, and the expression "the Socialist Republic" is placed at the elevated centre.
9. The floral arabesques are on either side of the ears of paddy and the star.
10. The two main floral a

==== Symbolism ====
1. The white star is the continued recognition of the revolutionary tradition.
2. The map of Myanmar is to make the State of Myanmar be distinct and famous.
3. The ears of paddy and the pinion are the representations for peasants and workers who are the two fundamental social classes of building the socialist system.
4. The two lions are the symbols in use according to the tradition of Myanmar.
5. The floral arabesques are to beautify in accordance with the art of painting.

=== 1989-2011 ===
As of 2025, websites of some embassies are still featuring the image and description of the pre-2011 State Seal in English as follow.

1. At the center of the State Seal is a pinion with fourteen equal-sized cogs on which the map of Myanmar is superimposed. The pinion and the map are encircled with two ears of paddy.
2. The ears of paddy are flanked on each side by an artistic Myanmar Lion. The lion on the right side faces towards the right and the one on the left side faces towards the left.
3. The words "The Union of Myanmar" are inscribed in Myanmar below the lions and the ears of paddy.
4. At the top of the State Seal is a star with five vertices.
5. Myanmar floral designs are etched on either side of the ears of paddy and the star.

=== 2011-2025 ===
==== Marks ====
The 2010 version of the State Seal Law does not included the symbolism but the description of the marks contained in the State Seal as follow:

1. At the centre of the State Seal is the map of the Republic of the Union of Myanmar. The sprigs of eugenia containing fourteen leaves each are on either side of the map;
2. The sprigs of eugenia are flanked on each side by an artistic Myanmar lion. The lion on the left side faces towards the left and the lion on the right side faces towards the right;
3. The expression “Republic of the Union of Myanmar” is inscribed on the ribbon at the foot of the State Seal. The expression “the Union” is placed under the left lion, the expression “the Republic” is placed at the centre under the map of the Republic of the Union of Myanmar and the expression “Myanmar” is placed under the right lion;
4. At the top of the State Seal is a star with five vertices that indicate above uprightly;
5. Myanmar traditional floral arabesques are on either side of the star.
6. The specimen of the State Seal is as shown in the appendix.

==== Symbolism ====
Before 2025, the only official symbolism available was from the National Convention. The symbolism presented at the meeting on 22 December 2006 is published in English as follows:

1. Concerning the State, the National Convention has adopted the fundamental principles "sovereign power of the State is derived from the citizens and is in force in the whole country" and "the State shall be known as the Pyidaungsu Thamada Myanmar Naing-Ngan Daw (the Union of the Republic of Myanmar)". Hence, the State Seal should include the map of the Union of Myanmar.
2. In accord with the adopted fundamental principle "the State shall be known as the Pyidaungsu Thamada Myanmar Naing-Ngan Daw", the words "Pyidaungsu Thamada Myanmar Naing-Ngan Daw" should be included in the State Seal.
3. The white star that is the symbol of the anti-colonialist and anti-Fascist struggles launched with the people's strength should also be included in it.
4. The Seal should be decorated with the picture of the lion king used as a tradition in the State seals of the Union Myanmar, and Myanmar traditional floral arabesque.

== Gallery ==
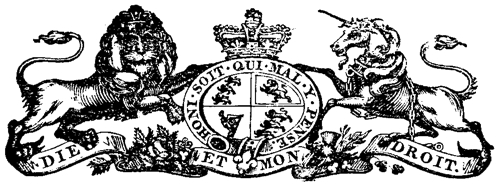
Coat of arms of Burma (1886–1941, 1945–1948)

State Seal of the State of Burma
(1943–1945)

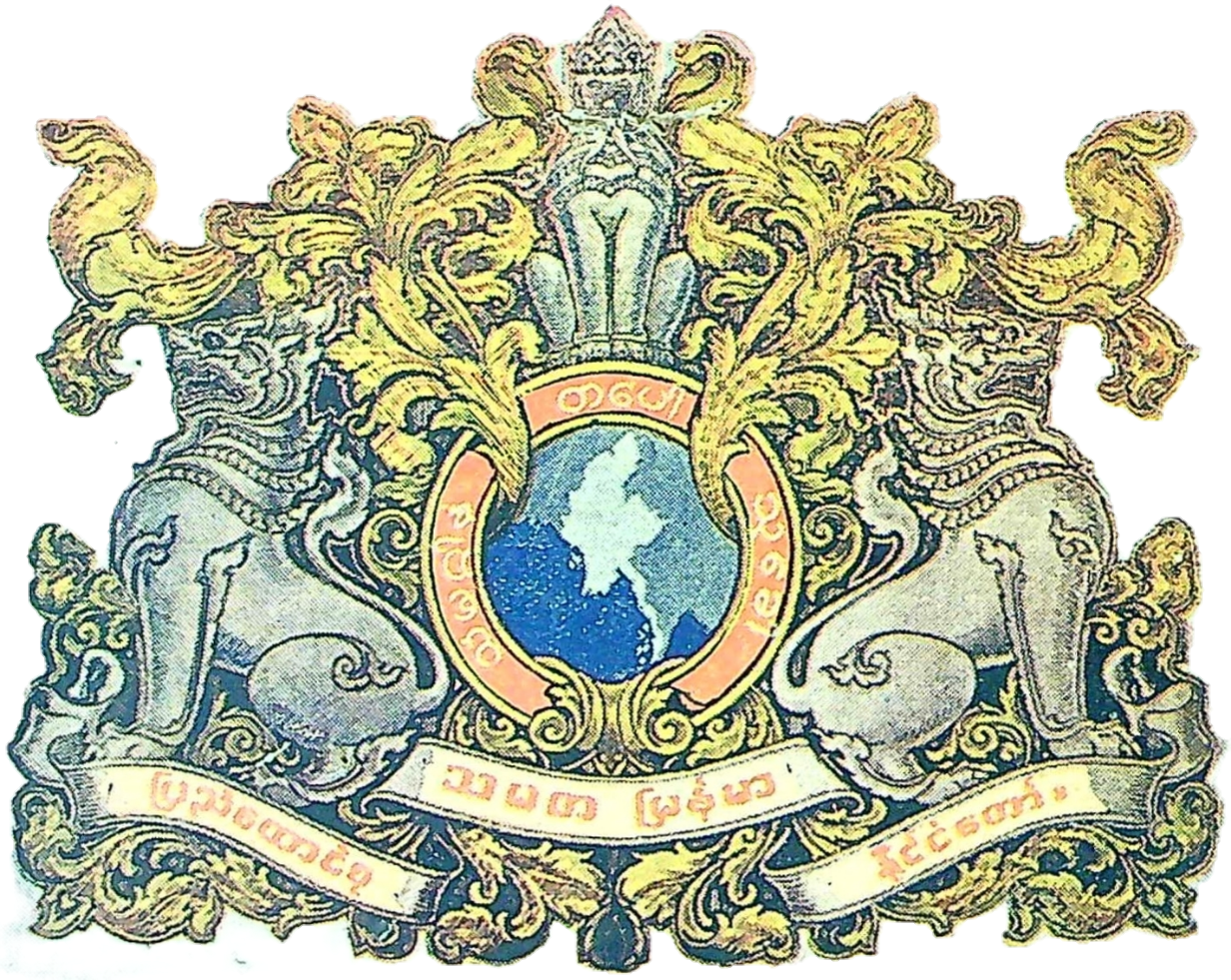
State Seal of the Union of Burma
(4 January 1948 – 3 January 1974)

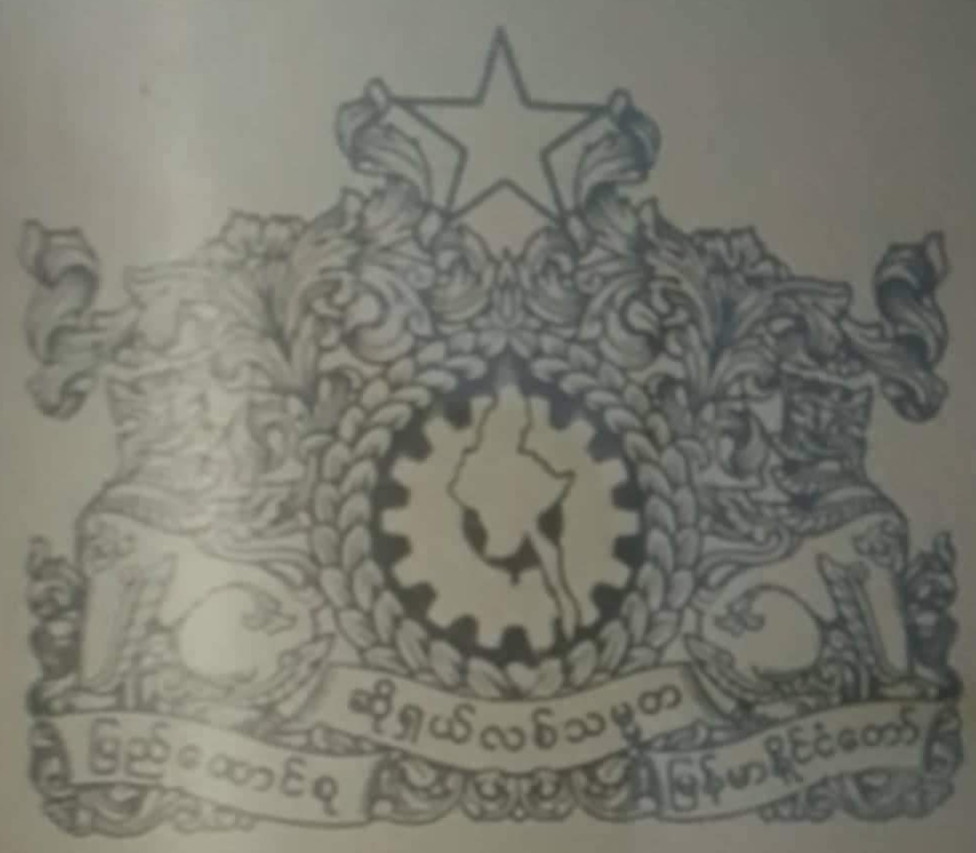
State Seal of the
Socialist Republic of the Union of Burma
(As shown in the Constitution of the Socialist Republic of the Union of Burma, 1974)

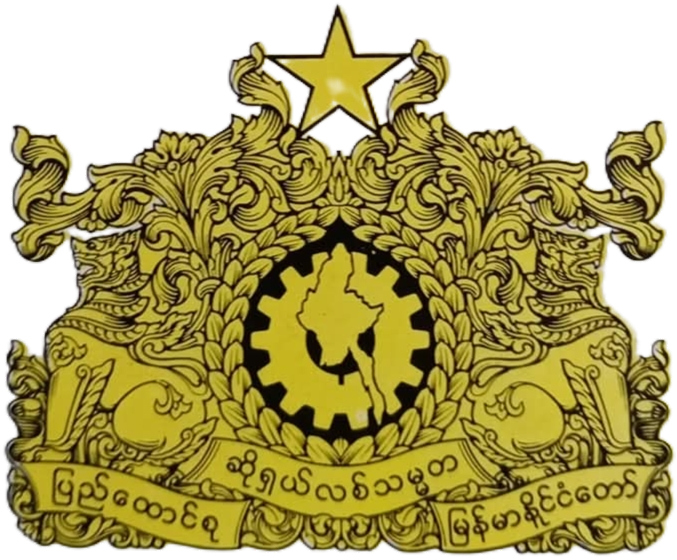
State Seal of the
Socialist Republic of the Union of Burma
(3 January 1974 – 19 October 1988)

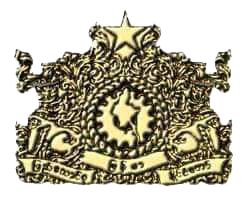
State Seal of the Union of Burma
/ Union of Myanmar
(19 October 1988 – 31 January 2011)

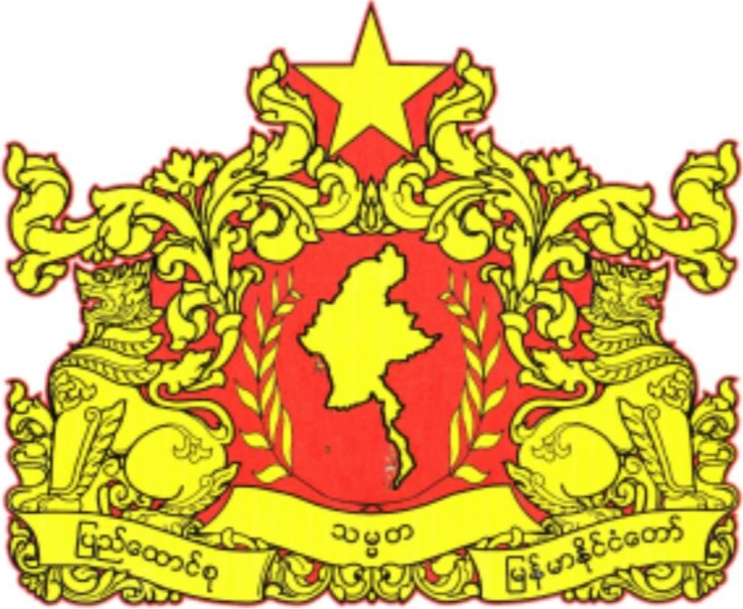
State Seal of the Republic of
the Union of Myanmar
(As shown in the Constitution of the Republic of the Union of Myanmar, 2008)

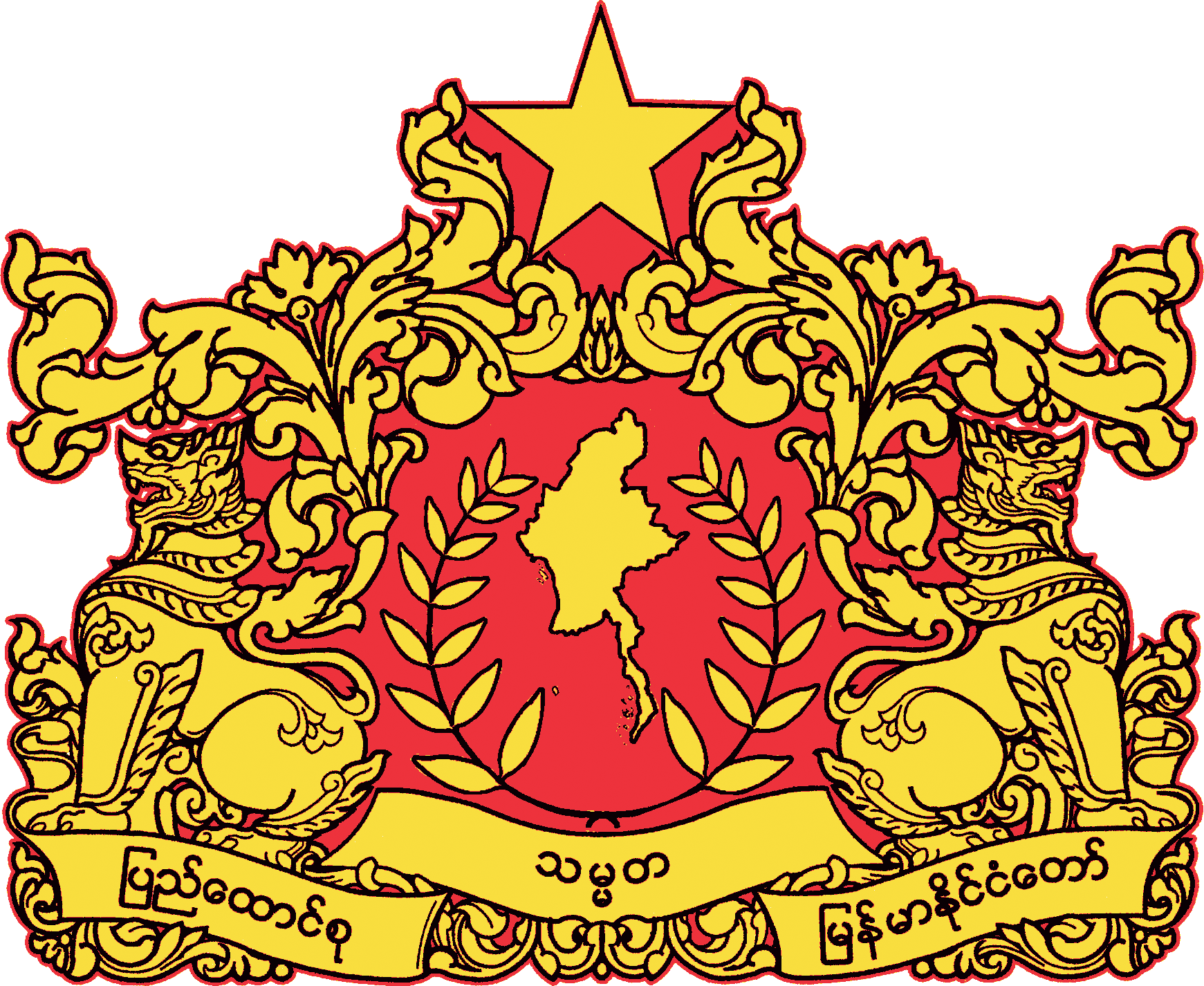
Variant version of the State Seal of the Republic of
the Union of Myanmar
(31 January 2011 – 11 August 2025)

Variant version of the State Seal of the Republic of
the Union of Myanmar
(2016 – 11 August 2025)

State Seal of the Republic of
the Union of Myanmar
(11 August 2025 - )

== See also ==
- Flag of Myanmar
- Emblem of Tatmadaw
