= Chinthe =

Lion in Burmese culture

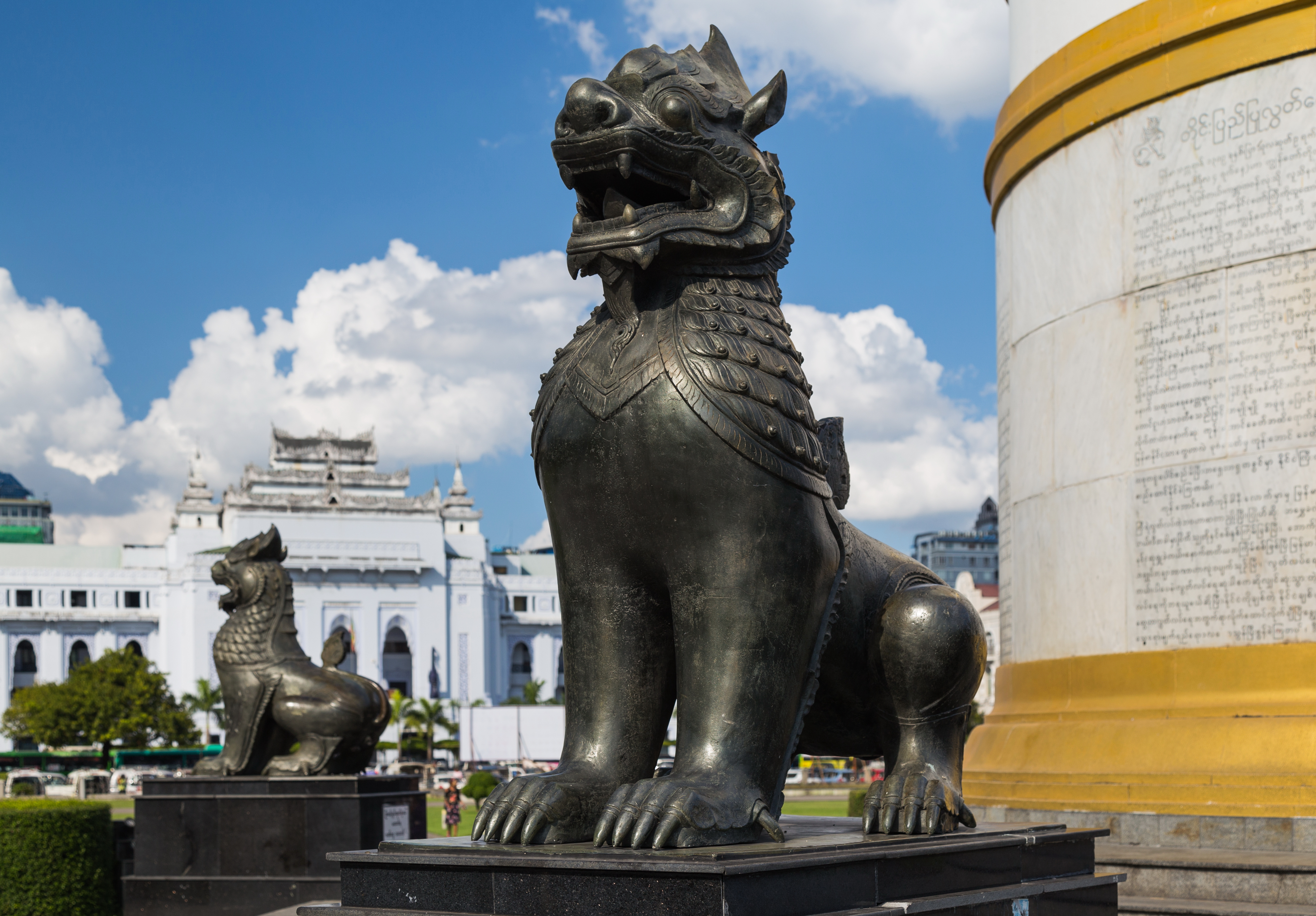
Lion statues surround the Independence Monument in Maha Bandula Park, in front of Yangon City Hall

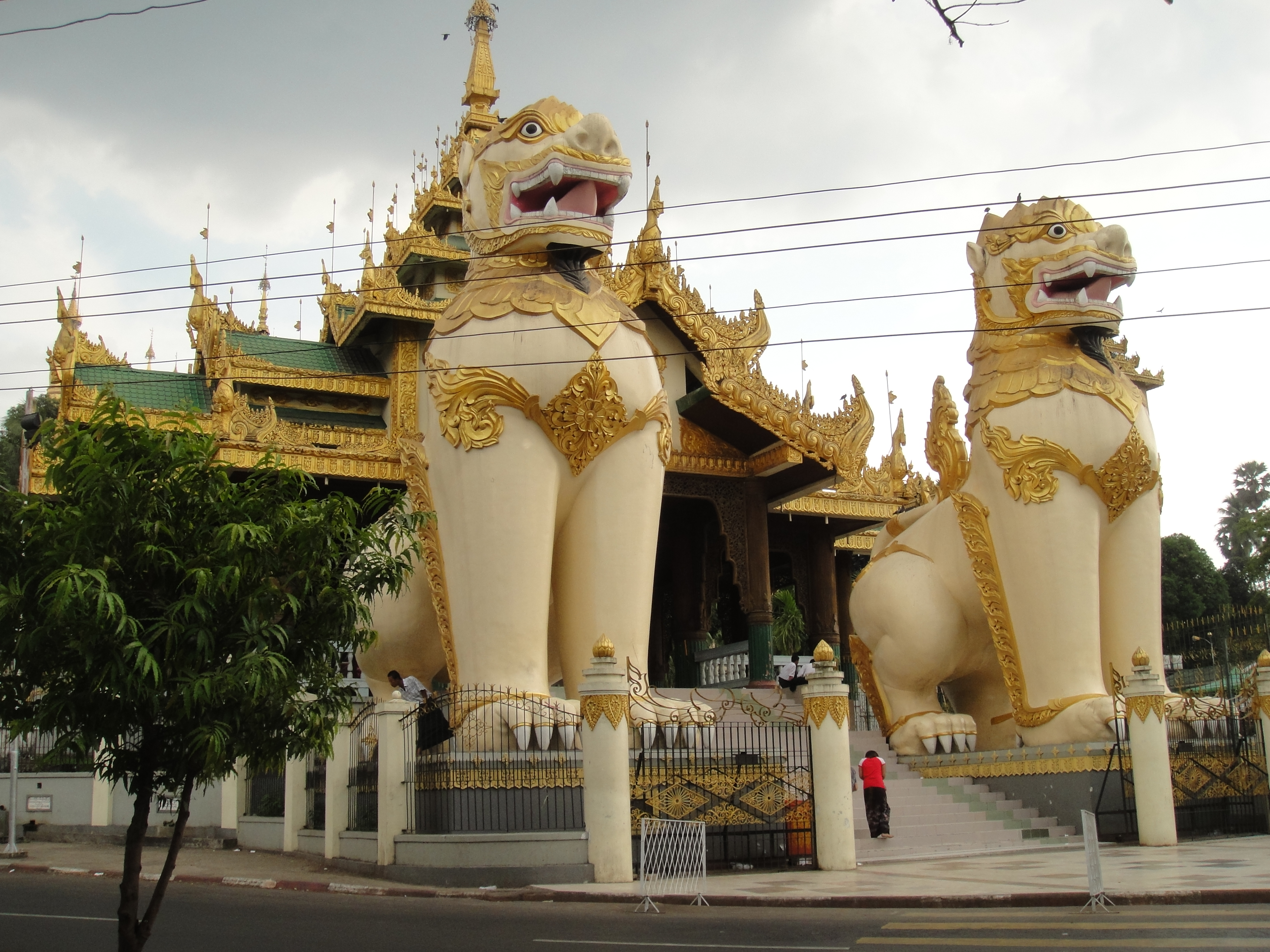
Two lions guard the entrance to Shwedagon Pagoda

Chinthë (Note: ခြင်္သေ့: MLCTS: hkrangse.; ALA-LC: khraṅse′; BGN/PCGN: chinthe / chinthayt) (Burmese: ခြင်္သေ့ (IPA: [tɕʰɪ̀ɰ̃ðḛ]); Mon: ဇာဒိသိုၚ် ([cɛ̀atìʔsaŋ]); Shan: သၢင်ႇသီႈ ([sàːŋ si])) is the Burmese word for 'lion'. The leograph of Chinthe is a highly stylized lion commonly depicted in Burmese iconography and architecture, especially as a pair of guardians flanking the entrances of Buddhist pagodas and kyaung (or Buddhist monasteries).

== Natural lion ==
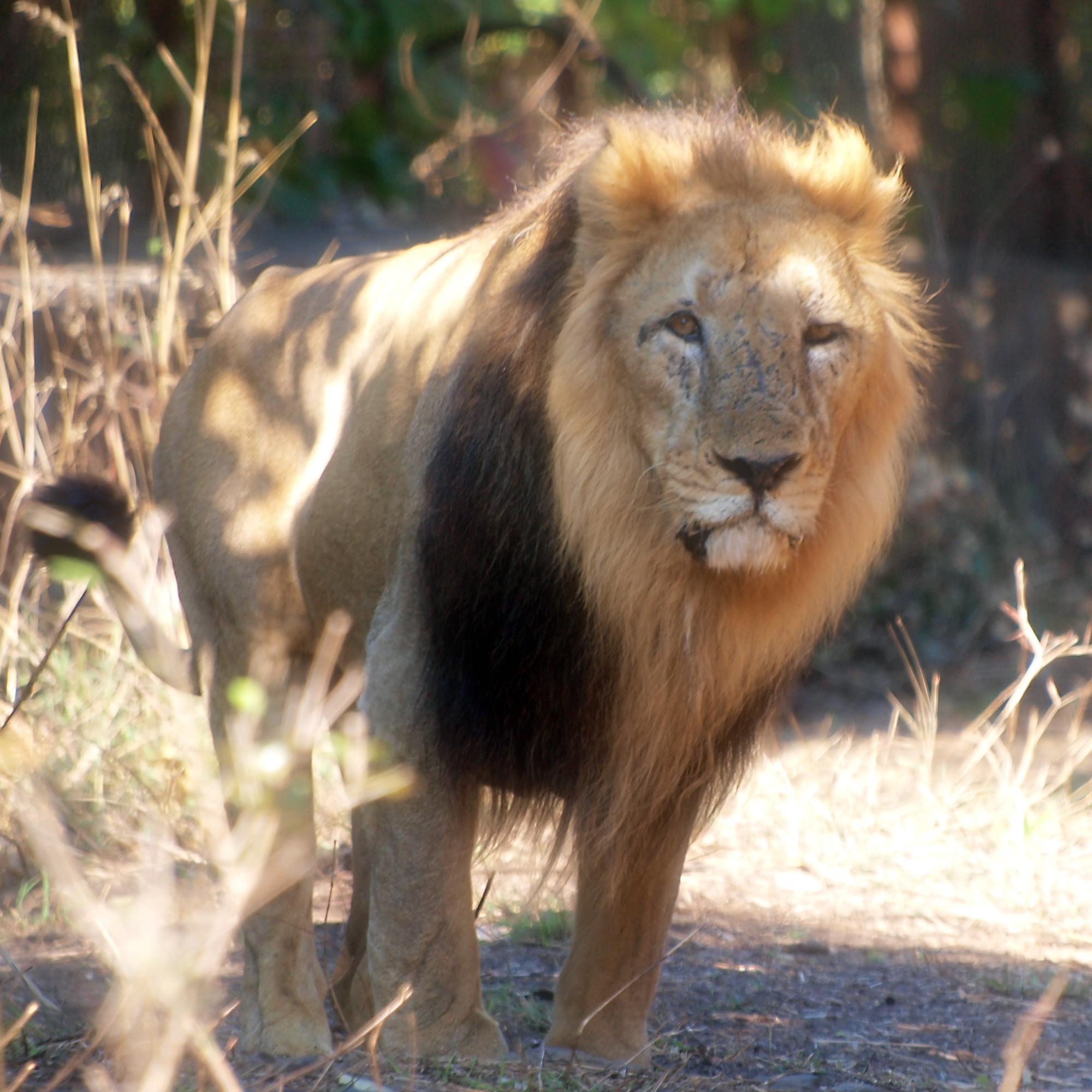
The lion is known as Chinthe in Burmese

Contrary to popular belief, the Chinthe is not a mythical creature but instead an entirely natural lion, although often associated with myths and legends.

The Burmese leograph is related to other stylized lions in the Asian region, including the sing (สิงห์) of Thailand, Cambodia, Laos, and the simha (සිංහ) of Sri Lanka, where it is featured prominently on the Sri Lankan rupee. It is also related to East Asian leographs, such as the guardian lions of China, komainu of Japan, shisa of Okinawa and Snow Lion of Tibet.

== Origins ==
The story of why the lions guard the entrances of pagodas and temples is given in the Mahavamsa:

The princess Suppadevi of Vanga Kingdom (present day Bengal) had a son named Sinhabahu through her marriage to a lion, but later abandoned the lion who then became enraged and set out on a road of terror throughout the lands. The son then went out to slay this terrorizing lion. The son came back home to his mother stating he slew the lion, and then found out that he killed his own father. The son later constructed a statue of the lion as a guardian of a temple to atone for his sin.

The lion symbol on the State seals

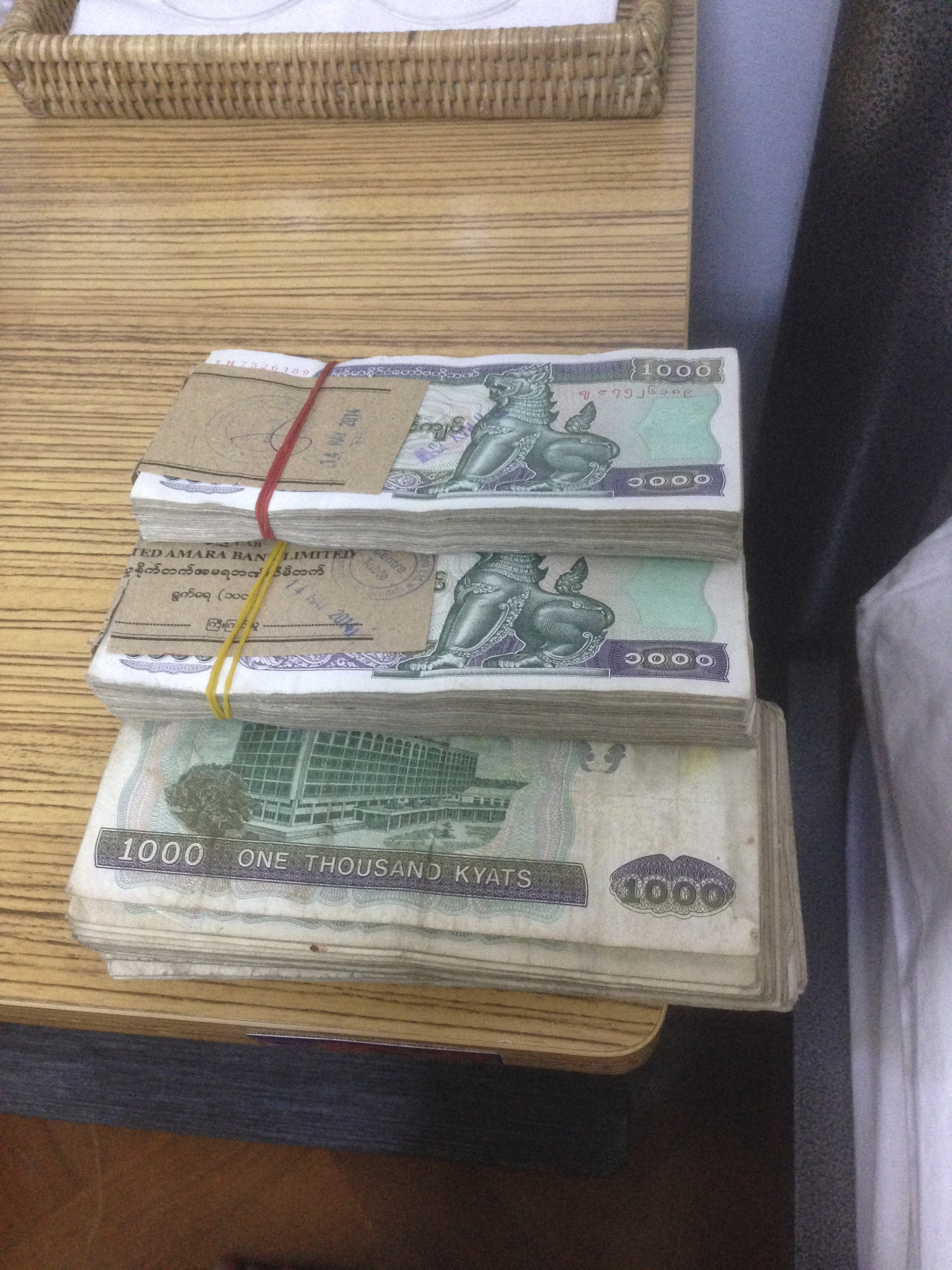
1000 Kyat paper money

== In Burmese culture ==
The leograph of Chinthe appears as an element of Burmese iconography on many revered objects, including the palin (Burmese royal throne) and Burmese bells.

Predating the use of coins for money, brass weights cast in the shape of iconic animals like the Chinthe were commonly used to measure standard quantities of staple items.

In the Burmese zodiac, the lion sign is representative of Tuesday-born individuals.

The leograph is featured prominently on the successive post-independence State seals (including the current State Seal of Myanmar) and most paper denominations of the Burmese kyat, and its statues are found as guardian statues of most pagodas and temples.

== Gallery ==
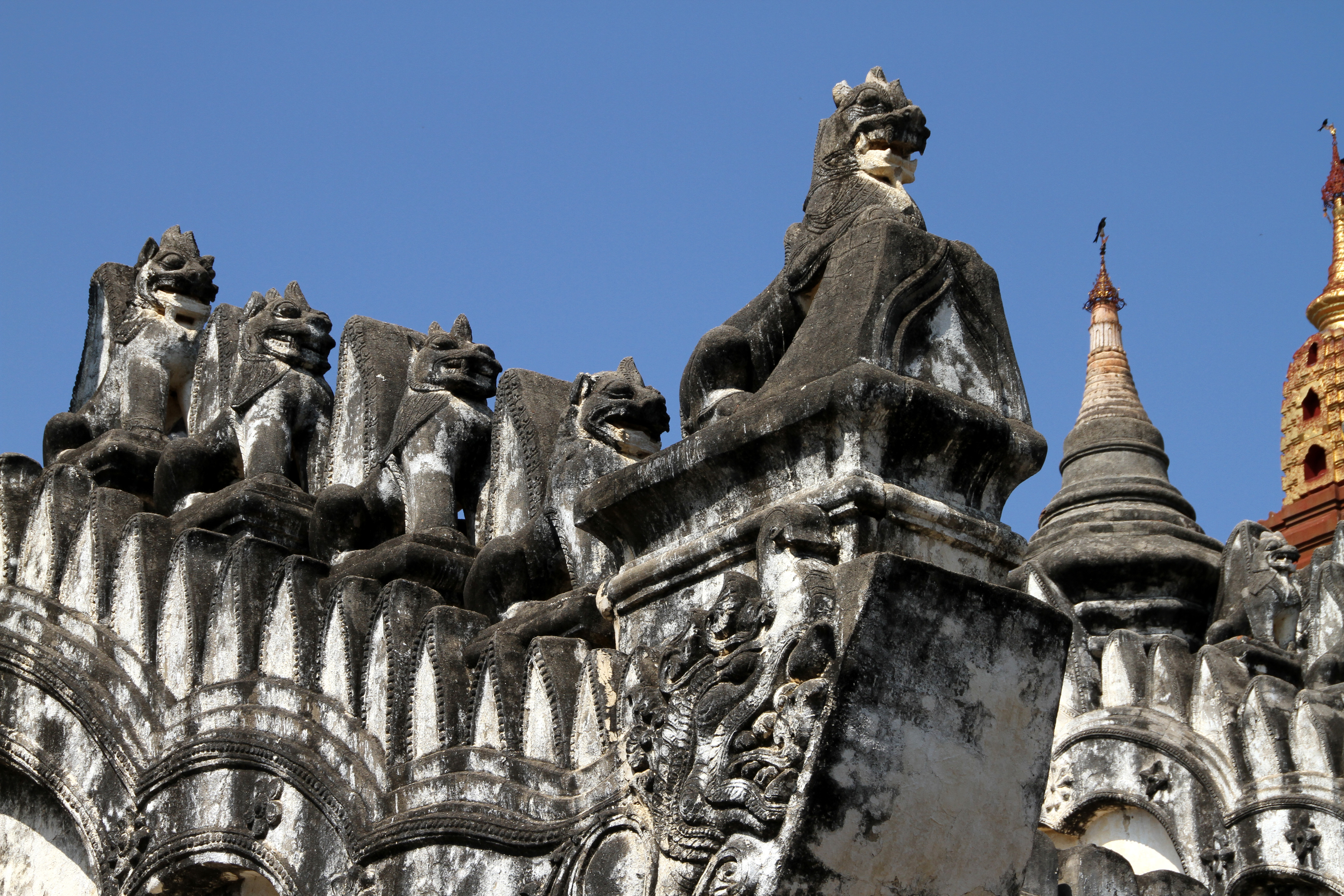
Leographic statues line the rooftop at Bagan's Ananda Temple

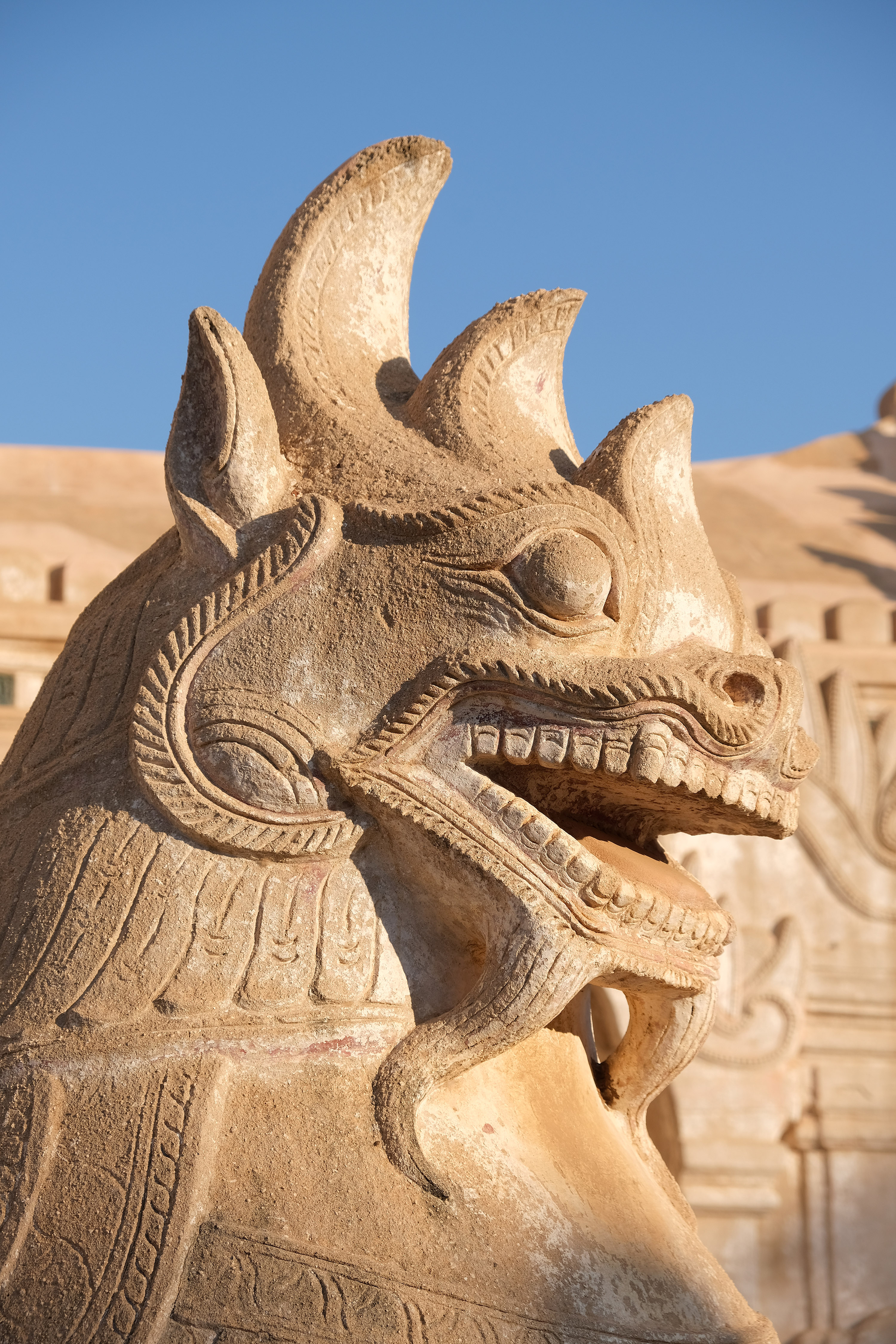
Close-up of the stylized lion head, Ananda Temple

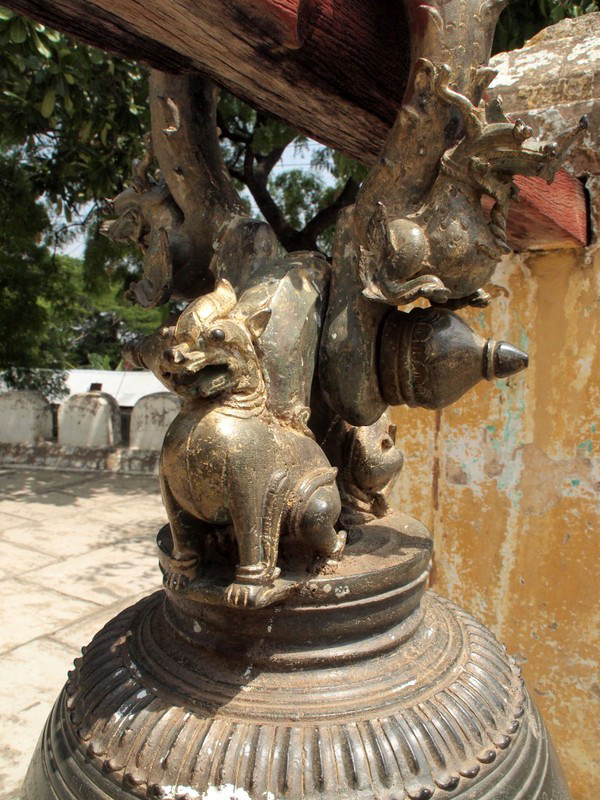
Temple bell in Bagan, Myanmar

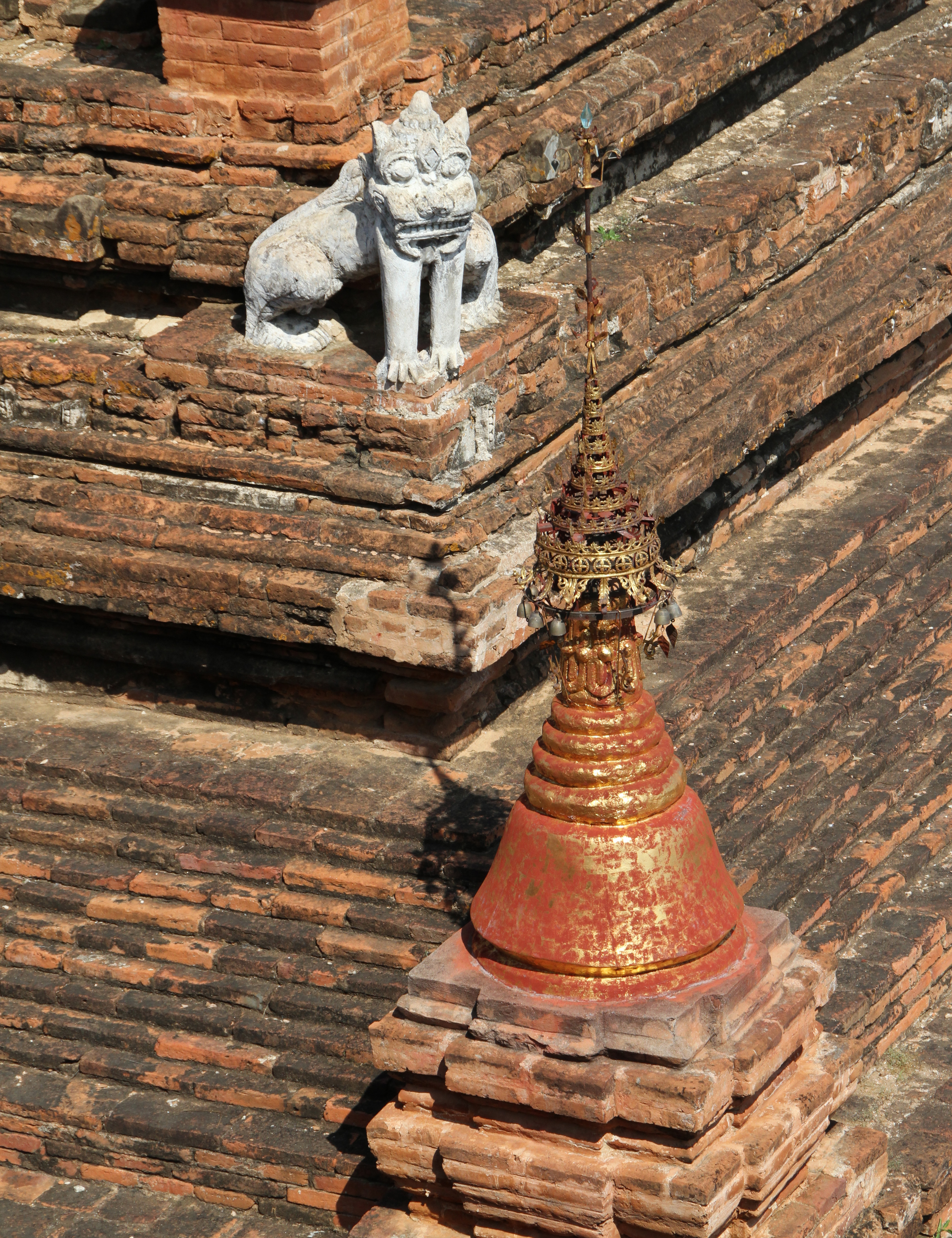
Lion statue on Dhammayazika Pagoda, Bagan, Myanmar

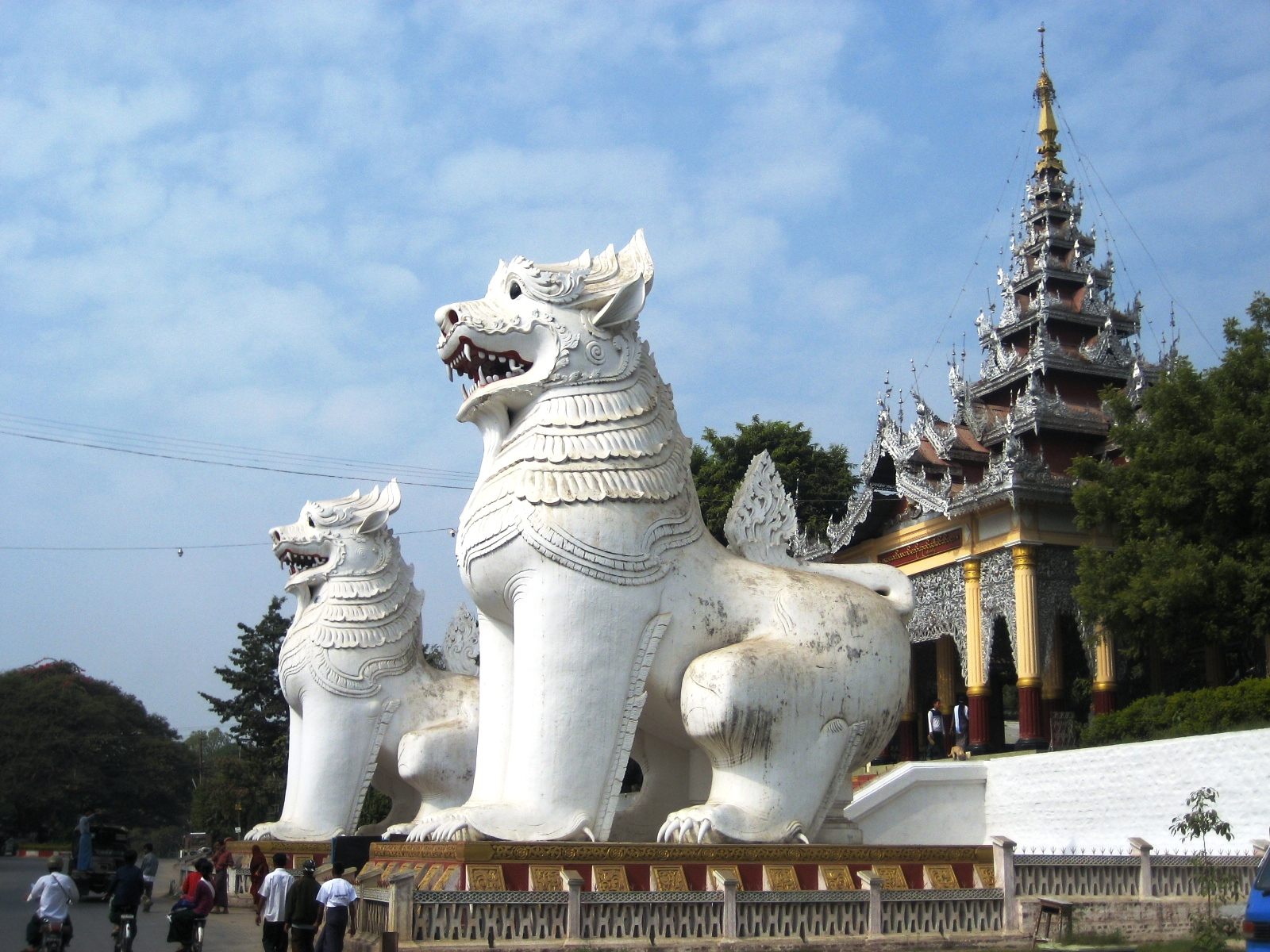
A pair of whitewashed lions guard the entrance to Mandalay Hill

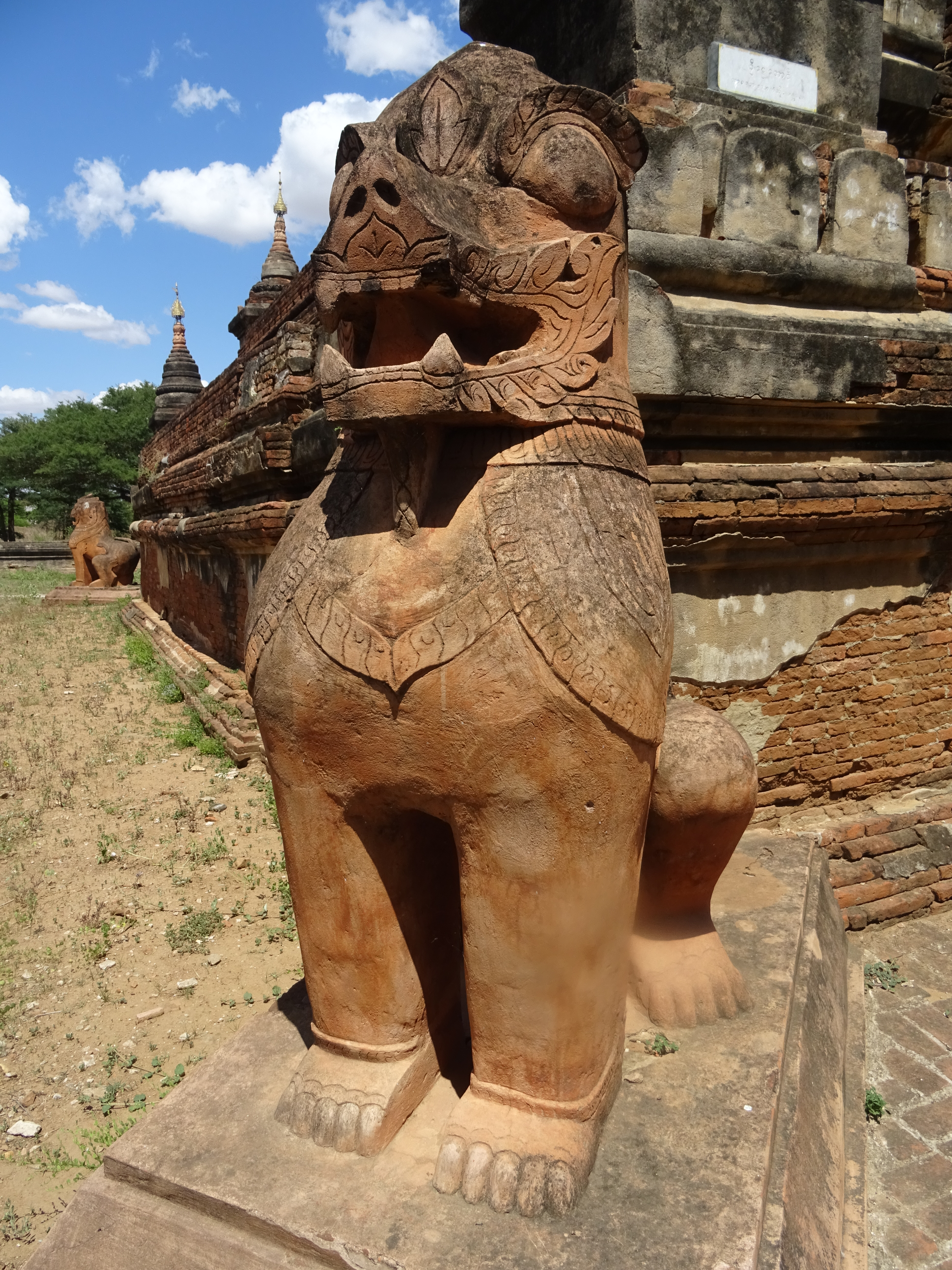
Chinthe of So Hla Waing in Bagan, Myanmar

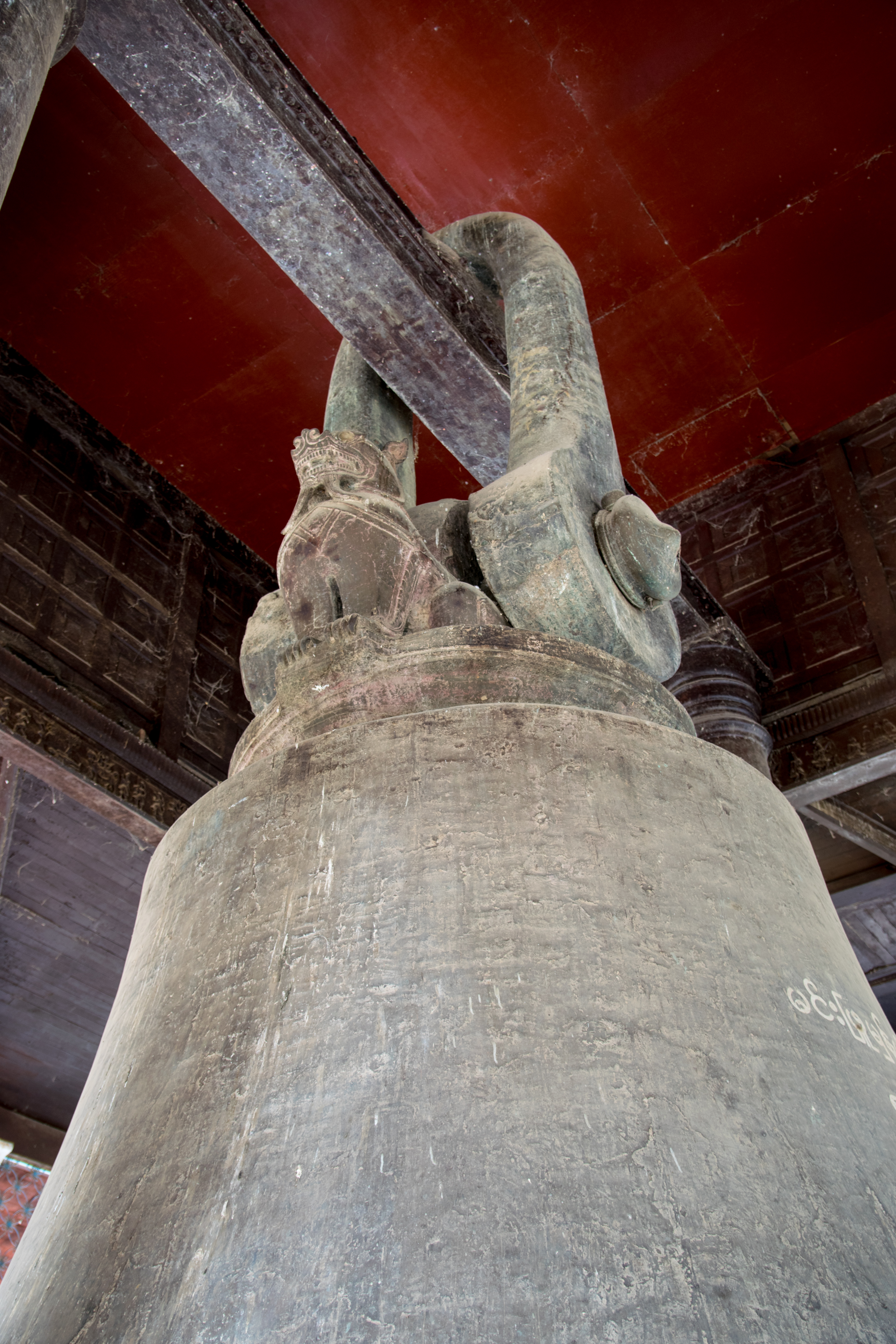
Chinthe atop the Mingun Bell

== Relation to Second World War Chindits ==
During the Second World War, the British Brigadier Orde Wingate was given command of forces charged with long-range penetration operations behind Japanese lines in Burma. At the suggestion of Captain Aung Thin of the Burma Rifles, Wingate decided to call this force "The Chinthes" (The Lions), a name which became corrupted to "The Chindits" and was so recorded in the annals of World War II.

Chinthe is also the nickname of the Canadian 435 Squadron, formed originally in 1944 in India. The badge of the RCAF 435th features a chinthe on a plinth.

The present-day brigade in the British Army is named the 77th Brigade in tribute to the 77th Indian Infantry Brigade, which was part of Wingates's Chindits. The formation badge of the revived 77th shows a stylised lion known as a Chinthe in reference to the Chindits.

== See also ==
- Asiatic lion
- Chinese guardian lions
- Shisa
- Shishi
- Singh
- Lion dance
