= Mya Thaung =

Burmese painter (born 1943)

- မြသောင်း
- Born: 1943 (age 82–83); Bogalay, Japanese Burma
- Known for: Painting

Mya Thaung (Burmese: မြသောင်း [mja̰ θáʊɰ̃]; born 1943) is a Burmese painter. Born in Bogalay, he studied at the State School of Fine Art in Yangon from 1965 to 1967. He has showcased his works all over the Asia Pacific region, Korea, Japan, Singapore, Australia etc. In 1990 he entered a Water Color Contest in New York City and won first prize. In September–October 1992, his paintings appeared in the Arts of Asia Magazine.
