= Myanmar =

Country in Southeast Asia

Republic of the Union of Myanmar: ပြည်ထောင်စုသမ္မတမြန်မာနိုင်ငံတော် (Burmese); Pranyhtaungcu. Sa.ma.ta. Mranma Nuingngamtau
- Flag State Seal
- Anthem: ကမ္ဘာမကျေ Kaba Ma Kyei "Till the End of the World"
- Location of Myanmar (green) in Southeast Asia
- Capital: Naypyidaw (Note: Officially spelled "Nay Pyi Taw"); 21°00′N 96°00′E
- Largest city: Yangon
- Official language: Burmese
- Recognised regional languages: Chin; Kachin; Karen; Kayah; Mon; Rakhine; Shan
- Ethnic groups (2019): 68.78% Bamar; 6.69% Karen; 4.61% Rakhine; 4.51% Shan; 2.19% Mon; 2.09% Chin; 1.50% Kachin; 0.39% Karenni
- Religion (2014 (Note: Based on the estimated overall population, including both the enumerated (50,279,900) and non-enumerated population (51,486,253), and on the assumption that the non-enumerated population in Rakhine State affiliates with the Islamic faith.; As of December 2019, Muslims probably make up less than 3% of Myanmar's total population due to the large outmigration of the Rohingya population since 2017.)): 87.9% Buddhism; 6.2% Christianity; 4.3% Islam; 0.8% folk religion (Note: Cited as animism in data.); 0.5% Hinduism; 0.1% no religion; 0.2% other
- Demonyms: Burmese; Myanmar; Myanma
- Government: Unitary presidential assembly-independent republic
  - President: Min Aung Hlaing
  - First Vice President: Nyo Saw
  - Second Vice President: Nan Ni Ni Aye
- Legislature: Pyidaungsu Hluttaw
  - Upper house: Amyotha Hluttaw
  - Lower house: Pyithu Hluttaw

Formation
  - Pagan era: 23 December 849
  - Taungoo era: 16 October 1510
  - Konbaung era: 29 February 1752
  - British Burma: 1 January 1886
  - Independence from the United Kingdom: 4 January 1948
  - 1962 coup d'état: 2 March 1962
  - 1988 coup d'état: 18 September 1988
  - latest constitution: 29 May 2008
  - 2021 coup d'état: 1 February 2021

Area
  - Total: 676,579 km^{2} (261,229 sq mi) (39th)
  - Water (%): 3.06

Population
  - 2024 census: ▲51,316,756 (29th)
  - Density: 217/sq mi (83.8/km^{2}) (127th)
- GDP (PPP): 2026 estimate
  - Total: ▲$291.559 billion (71st)
  - Per capita: ▲$5,283 (158th)
- GDP (nominal): 2026 estimate
  - Total: ▲$83.172 billion (84th)
  - Per capita: ▲$1,507 (164th)
- Gini (2017): ▼30.7 medium inequality
- HDI (2023): ▲0.609 medium (150th)
- Currency: Myanmar kyat (K) (MMK)
- Time zone: UTC+06:30 (MMT)
- Calling code: +95
- ISO 3166 code: MM
- Internet TLD: .mm
- Website myanmar.gov.mm

Myanmar, (Note: Burmese: မြန်မာ, MLCTS: Mranma, pronounced [mjəmà]) officially the Republic of the Union of Myanmar (Note: Burmese: ပြည်ထောင်စု သမ္မတ မြန်မာနိုင်ငံတော်, MLCTS: Pranyhtaungcu. Sa.ma.ta. Mranma Nuingngamtau; pronounced [pjìdàʊɴzṵ θàɴməda̰ mjəmà nàɪɴŋàɴdɔ̀]) and also referred to as Burma (the official English name until 1989), is a country in northwest Southeast Asia. It is the largest country by area in Mainland Southeast Asia and had a population of about 51 million at the time of 2024 census. It is bordered by India and Bangladesh to the northwest, China to the northeast, Laos and Thailand to the east and southeast, and the Andaman Sea and the Bay of Bengal to the south and southwest. The country's capital city is Naypyidaw, while its largest city is Yangon (formerly Rangoon).

Early civilisations in the area included the Tibeto-Burman-speaking Pyu city-states in Upper Myanmar and the Mon kingdoms in Lower Myanmar. In the 9th century, the Bamar people entered the upper Irrawaddy valley, and following the establishment of the Pagan Kingdom in the 1050s, the Burmese language and culture and Theravada Buddhism slowly became dominant in the country. The Pagan Kingdom fell to Mongol invasions, and several warring states emerged. In the 16th century, reunified by the Taungoo dynasty, the country became the largest empire in the history of Southeast Asia for a short period. The early 19th-century Konbaung dynasty ruled over an area that included modern Myanmar and briefly controlled Assam, the Lushai Hills, and Manipur as well. The British East India Company seized control of the administration of Myanmar after three Anglo-Burmese Wars in the 19th century, and the country became a British colony. After a brief Japanese occupation, Myanmar was reconquered by the Allies. In 1948, Myanmar declared independence under the terms of the Burma Independence Act 1947.

Myanmar's post-independence history has been checkered by continuous unrest and conflict. A coup d'état in 1962 resulted in a military dictatorship under the Burma Socialist Programme Party. The 8888 Uprising in 1988 resulted in a transition to a multi-party system two years later, but the country's post-uprising military junta, led by members of the Tatmadaw, refused to cede power and continued to rule the country directly until 2011, when the junta was officially dissolved following the 2010 general election. A nominally civilian government was installed, and longtime political prisoners like Aung San Suu Kyi were released, but the military retained power over key government operations. The 2015 general election led to a transition of power to the National League for Democracy, although the country's treatment of its ethnic minorities, particularly the Rohingya genocide, continued to be a source of international tension. Following the 2020 general election, in which the NLD won a clear majority in both houses, the Tatmadaw again seized power in the 2021 coup d'état. The coup led to widespread protests and marked the outbreak of an ongoing civil war.

Myanmar is a member of the East Asia Summit, Non-Aligned Movement, ASEAN, and BIMSTEC, and is a Dialogue Partner of the Shanghai Cooperation Organization. The country is rich in natural resources, including jade, gems, oil, natural gas, teak, and high solar power potential. However, Myanmar suffers from prolonged political instability, corruption, poor infrastructure, and low levels of human development. The income gap in Myanmar is among the widest in the world, as a large proportion of the economy remains under military control. Myanmar continues to be classified as one of the least developed countries in the world.

The country remains riven by ethnic strife among its myriad ethnic groups, with one of the world's longest-running ongoing civil wars. The United Nations and human rights organizations have documented systemic human rights violations. The civil war has created a major ongoing humanitarian crisis; according to the United Nations High Commissioner for Refugees (UNHCR), there are over 1.3 million refugees and asylum seekers, and over 3.5 million people displaced internally.

== Etymology ==
The name of the country has been a matter of dispute and disagreement, particularly in the early 21st century, focusing mainly on the political legitimacy of those using Myanmar versus Burma. Both names derive from the earlier Burmese Mranma or Mramma, an ethnonym for the majority Burman ethnic group, of uncertain etymology. The terms are also popularly thought to derive from Sanskrit Brahmadeśa, 'land of Brahma'.

In 1989, the military government officially changed the English names of places, dating back to Burma's colonial period or earlier, to romanized versions of their official Burmese names, including that of the country itself: Burma became Myanmar. The renaming remains a contested issue. Many political and ethnic opposition groups and countries continue to use Burma because they do not recognise the legitimacy or authority of the military government.

The country's official full name is "Republic of the Union of Myanmar" (Burmese: ပြည်ထောင်စုသမ္မတ မြန်မာနိုင်ငံတော်, Pyihtaungsu Thamada Myanma Naingngantaw, pronounced [pjìdàʊɴzṵ θàɴməda̰ mjəmà nàɪɴŋàɴdɔ̀]). Countries that do not officially recognise that name use the long form "Union of Burma" instead. In English, the country is popularly known as either Burma or Myanmar. In Burmese, the pronunciation depends on the register used and is either Bama (pronounced [bəmà]) or Myamah (pronounced [mjəmà]).

Official United States foreign policy retains Burma as the country's name although the State Department's website lists the country as Burma (Myanmar). The United Nations uses Myanmar, as does the ASEAN and as do Australia, Russia, Germany, China, India, Bangladesh, Norway, Japan, Switzerland, Canada and Ukraine. Most English-speaking international news media refer to the country by the name Myanmar, including the BBC, CNN, Al Jazeera, Reuters, and the Australian Broadcasting Corporation (ABC)/Radio Australia. Myanmar is known by a name deriving from Burma in Spanish, Italian, Romanian, and Greek. French-language media consistently use Birmanie.

There are at least nine different pronunciations of the English name Myanmar, and no single one is standard. Pronunciations with two syllables are found most often in major British and American dictionaries. (Note: examples of two-syllable pronunciations: /ˌmjænˈmɑːr/, /ˈmjænmɑːr/, /ˌmjɑːnˈmɑːr/, or /ˈmjɑːnmɑːr/) Dictionaries—such as Collins—and other sources also report pronunciations with three syllables. (Note: examples of three-syllable pronunciations: /ˈmiːənmɑːr/, /miˈænmɑːr/, /ˌmaɪənˈmɑːr/, /maɪˈɑːnmɑːr/, or /ˈmaɪænmɑːr/)

As John Wells explains, the English spellings of both Myanmar and Burma assume a non-rhotic variety of English, in which the phonemic /ər/ and /ɑːr/ (as in Burma, Myanmar) are produced and received phonetically as /ɜː/ and /ɑː/, bearing more resemblance to the original Burmese pronunciation. However, as an English speaker's interpretation of rhoticity is dependent on their dialect, both rhotic and non-rhotic pronunciations of either name are correct, not due to any actual assimilation of Burmese phonetic features.

== History ==
=== Prehistory ===
Pyu city-states, c. 8th century

Archaeological evidence shows that Homo erectus lived in the region now known as Myanmar as early as 750,000 years ago, with no more erectus finds after 75,000 years ago. The first evidence of Homo sapiens is dated to about 25,000 BP with discoveries of stone tools in central Myanmar. Evidence of Neolithic age domestication of plants and animals and the use of polished stone tools dating to sometime between 10,000 and 6,000 BCE has been discovered in the form of cave paintings in Padah-Lin Caves.

The Bronze Age arrived c. 1500 BCE when people in the region were turning copper into bronze, growing rice and domesticating poultry and pigs; they were among the first people in the world to do so. Human remains and artefacts from this era were discovered in Monywa District in the Sagaing Region. The Iron Age began around 500 BCE with the emergence of iron-working settlements in an area south of present-day Mandalay. Evidence also shows the presence of rice-growing settlements of large villages and small towns that traded with their surroundings as far as China between 500 BCE and 200 CE. Iron Age Burmese cultures also had influences from outside sources such as India and Thailand, as seen in their funerary practices concerning child burials. This indicates some form of communication between groups in Myanmar and other places, possibly through trade.

=== Early city-states ===
Around the 2nd century BCE, the first-known city-states emerged in central Myanmar. These city-states were founded as part of the southward migration by the Tibeto-Burman-speaking Pyu people from present-day Yunnan. The Pyu culture was heavily influenced by trade with India, importing Buddhism as well as other cultural, architectural and political concepts, which would have an enduring influence on later Burmese culture and political organisation.

By the 9th century, several city-states had sprouted across the land: the Pyu in the central dry zone, Mon along the southern coastline and Arakanese along the western littoral. The balance was upset when the Pyu came under repeated attacks from Nanzhao between the 750s and the 830s. In the mid-to-late 9th century, the Bamar people founded a small settlement at Bagan. It was one of several competing city-states until the late 10th century, when it grew in authority and grandeur.

=== Pagan Kingdom ===
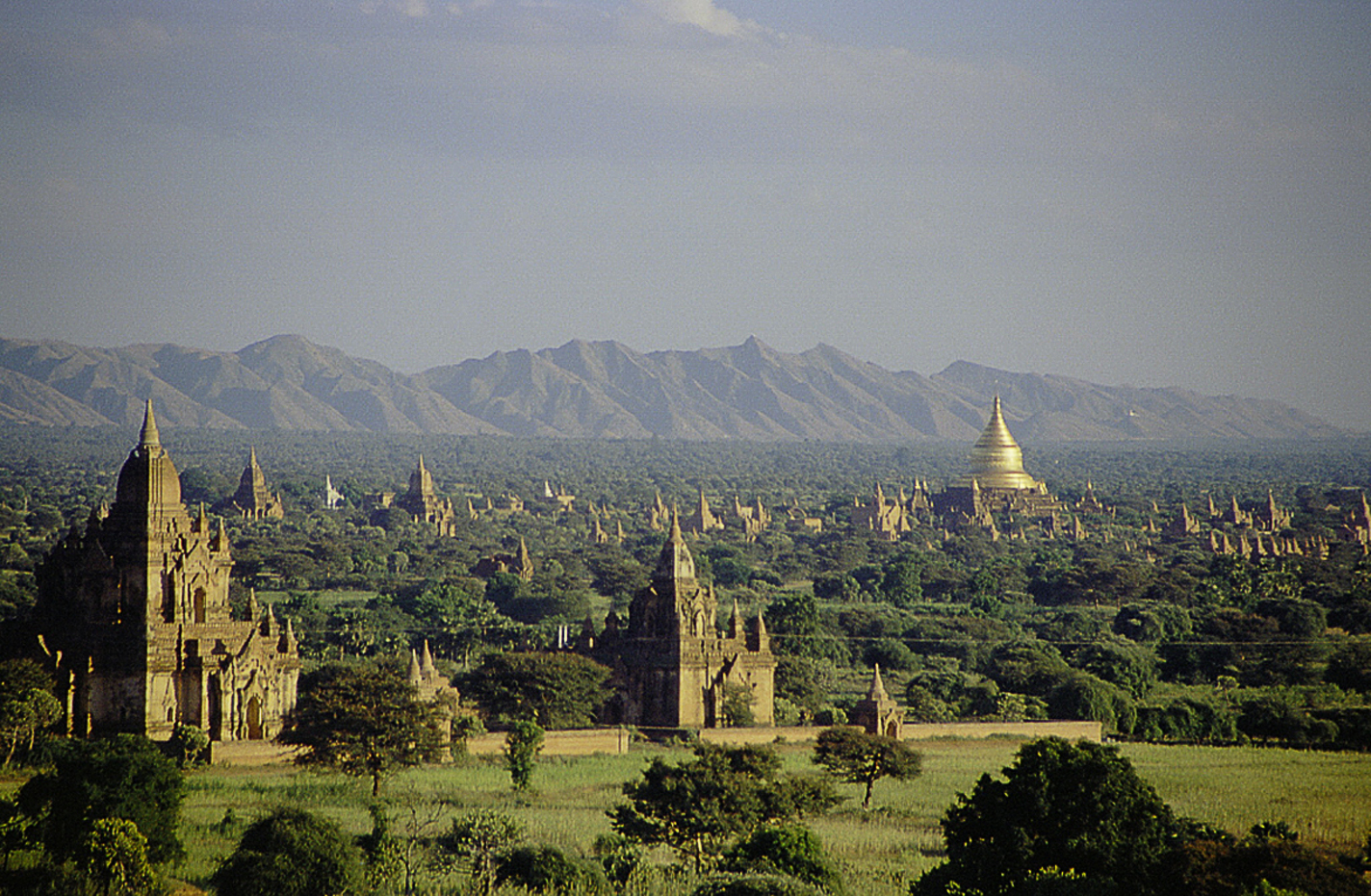
Pagodas and kyaungs in present-day Bagan, the capital of the Pagan Kingdom

Pagan gradually grew to absorb its surrounding states until the 1050s–1060s when Anawrahta founded the Pagan Kingdom, the first ever unification of the Irrawaddy valley and its periphery. In the 12th and 13th centuries, the Pagan Empire and the Khmer Empire were two main powers in mainland Southeast Asia. The Burmese language and culture gradually became dominant in the upper Irrawaddy valley, eclipsing the Pyu, Mon and Pali norms by the late 12th century. Theravada Buddhism slowly began to spread to the village level, although Tantric, Mahayana, Hinduism, and folk religion remained heavily entrenched. Pagan's rulers and the wealthy built over 10,000 Buddhist temples in the Pagan capital zone alone. Repeated Mongol invasions in the late 13th century toppled the four-century-old kingdom in 1287.

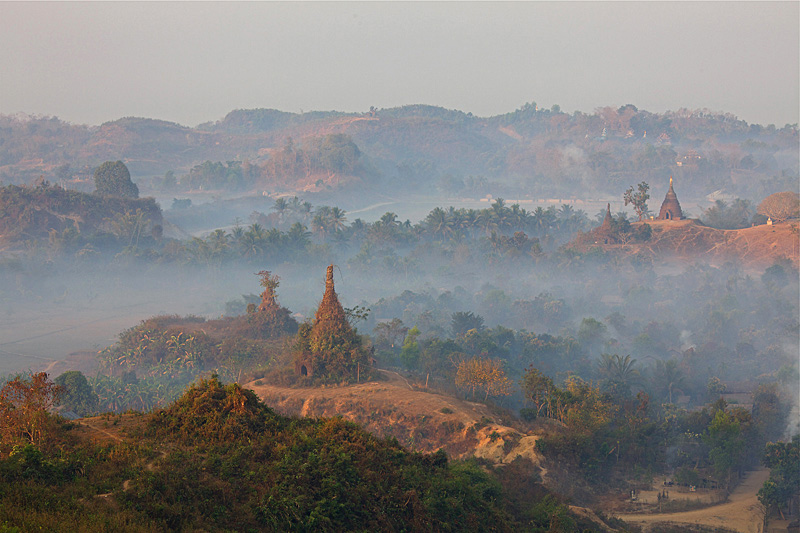
Temples at Mrauk U

Pagan's collapse was followed by 250 years of political fragmentation that lasted well into the 16th century. Like the Burmans four centuries earlier, Shan migrants who arrived with the Mongol invasions stayed behind. Several competing Shan States came to dominate the entire northwestern to eastern arc surrounding the Irrawaddy valley. The valley too was beset with petty states until the late 14th century when two sizeable powers, Ava Kingdom and Hanthawaddy kingdom, emerged. In the west, a politically fragmented Arakan was under competing influences of its stronger neighbours until the Kingdom of Mrauk U unified the Arakan coastline for the first time in 1437. The kingdom was a protectorate of the Bengal Sultanate at different time periods.

In the 14th and 15th centuries, Ava fought wars of unification but could never quite reassemble the lost empire. Having held off Ava, the Mon-speaking Hanthawaddy entered its golden age, and Arakan went on to become a power in its own right for the next 350 years. In contrast, constant warfare left Ava greatly weakened, and it slowly disintegrated from 1481 onward. In 1527, the Confederation of Shan States conquered Ava and ruled Upper Myanmar until 1555.

Like the Pagan Empire, Ava, Hanthawaddy, and the Shan states were all multi-ethnic polities. Despite the wars, cultural synchronisation continued. This period is considered a golden age for Burmese culture. Burmese literature "grew more confident, popular, and stylistically diverse", and the second generation of Burmese law codes, as well as the earliest pan-Burma chronicles emerged. Hanthawaddy monarchs introduced religious reforms that later spread to the rest of the country.

=== Taungoo and Konbaung dynasties ===
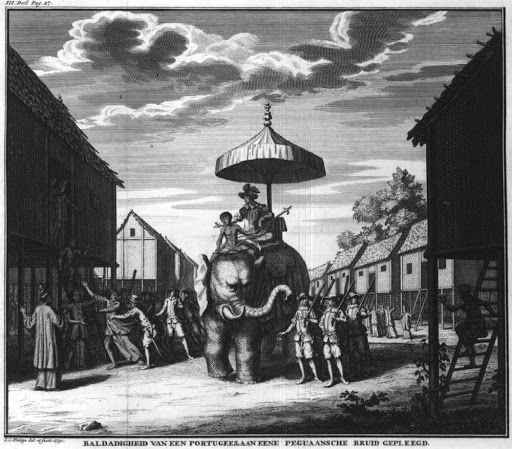
Portuguese ruler mounting an Elephant and his soldiers. Philips, Jan Caspar (draughtsman and engraver)

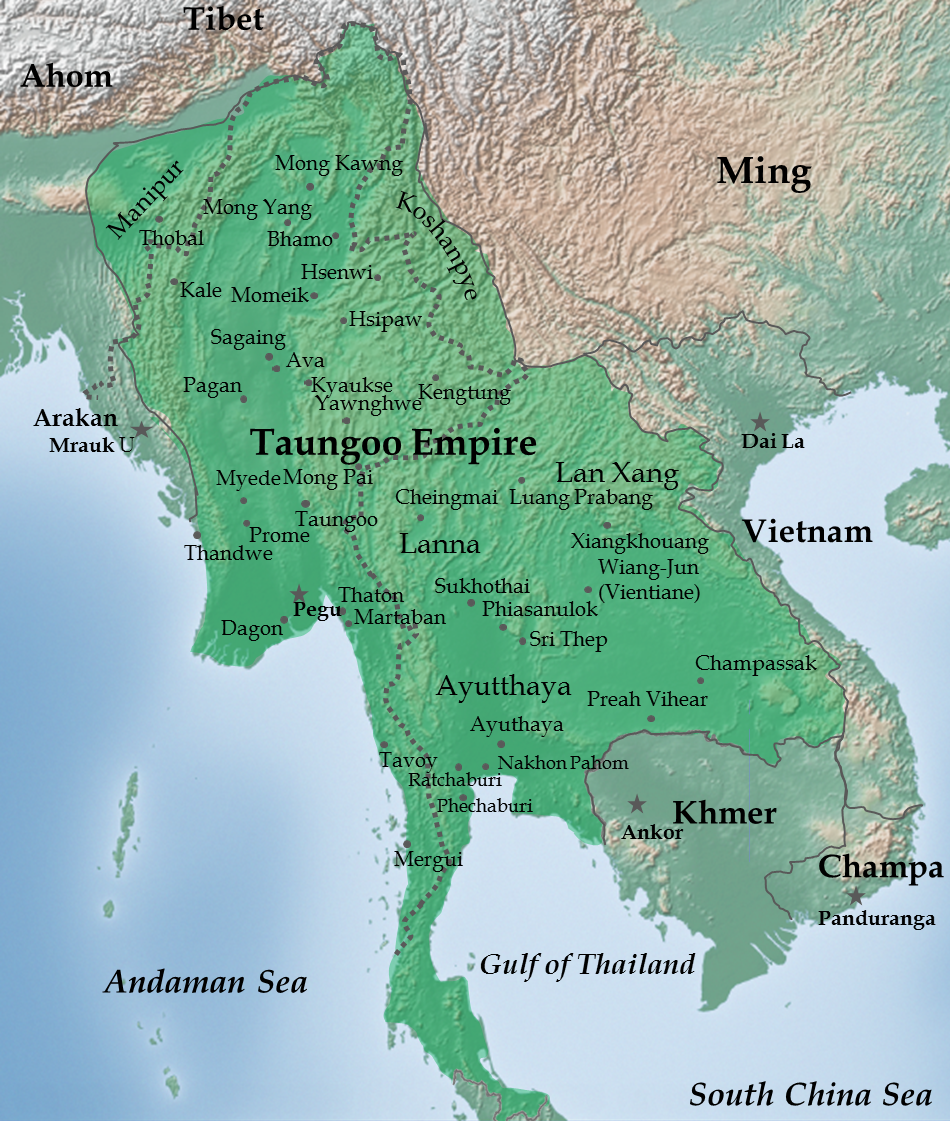
Toungoo Empire under Bayinnaung in 1580

Political unification returned in the mid-16th century, through the efforts of Taungoo, a former vassal state of Ava. Taungoo's young, ambitious King Tabinshwehti defeated the more powerful Hanthawaddy in the Toungoo–Hanthawaddy War. His successor Bayinnaung went on to conquer a vast swath of mainland Southeast Asia, including the Shan states, Lan Na, Manipur, Mong Mao, the Ayutthaya Kingdom, Lan Xang, and southern Arakan. However, the largest empire in the history of Southeast Asia unravelled soon after Bayinnaung died in 1581, and the empire collapsed by 1599. Ayutthaya seized Tenasserim and Lan Na, and Portuguese mercenaries established Portuguese rule at Thanlyin (Syriam).

The dynasty regrouped and defeated the Portuguese in 1613 and Siam in 1614. It restored a smaller, more manageable kingdom, encompassing Lower Myanmar, Upper Myanmar, Shan states, Lan Na and upper Tenasserim. The restored Toungoo kings created a legal and political framework whose basic features continued well into the 19th century. The crown completely replaced the hereditary chieftainships with appointed governorships in the entire Irrawaddy valley and greatly reduced the hereditary rights of Shan chiefs. Its trade and secular administrative reforms built a prosperous economy for more than 80 years. From the 1720s onward, the kingdom was beset with repeated Meithei raids into Upper Myanmar and a nagging rebellion in Lan Na. In 1740, the Mon of Lower Myanmar founded the Restored Hanthawaddy Kingdom. Hanthawaddy forces sacked Ava in 1752, ending the 266-year-old Toungoo Dynasty.

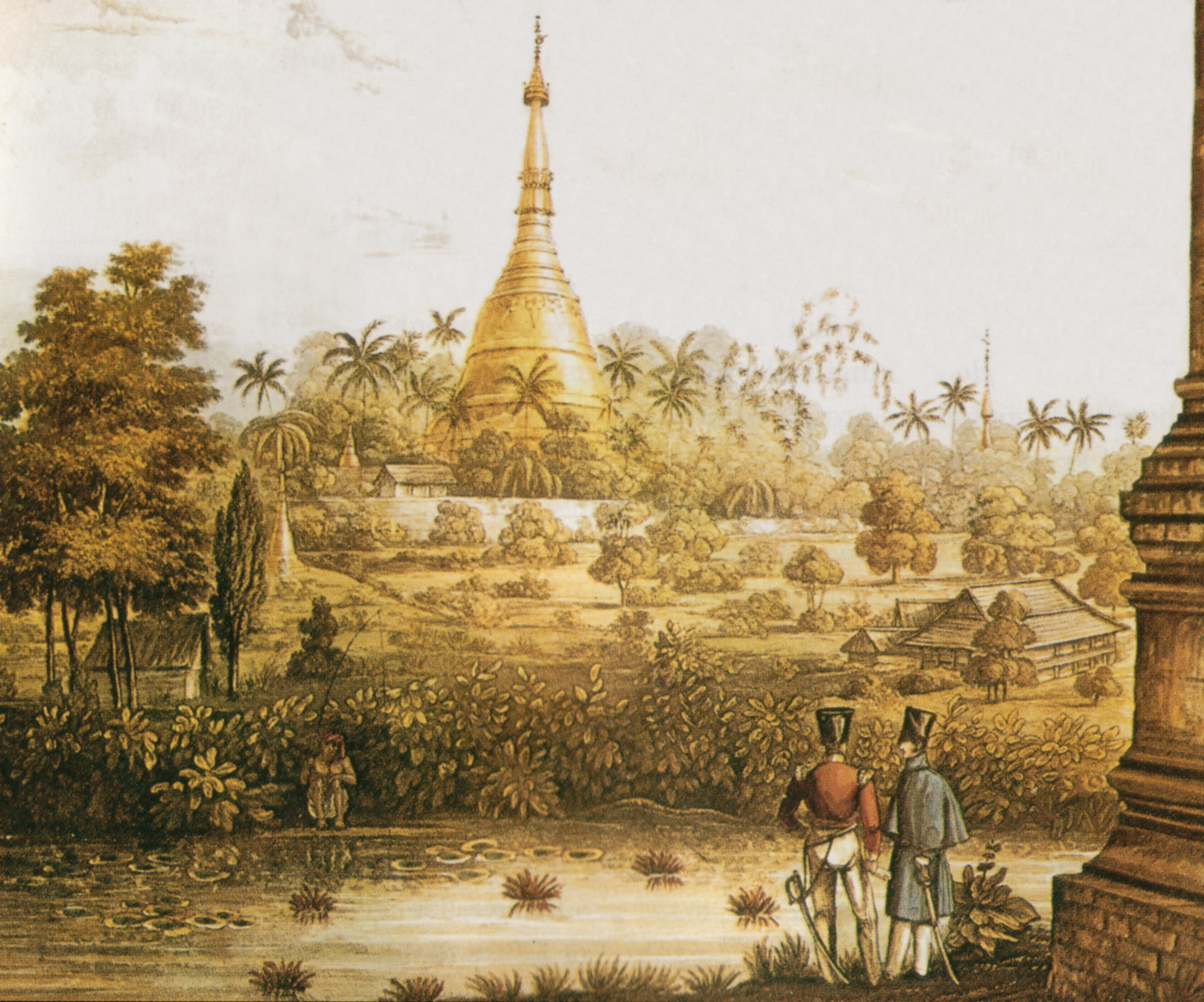
A British 1825 lithograph of Shwedagon Pagoda shows British occupation during the First Anglo-Burmese War.

After the fall of Ava, the Konbaung–Hanthawaddy War involved one resistance group under Alaungpaya defeating the Restored Hanthawaddy, and by 1759, he had reunited all of Myanmar and Manipur and driven out the French and the British, who had provided arms to Hanthawaddy. By 1770, Alaungpaya's heirs had subdued much of Laos and fought and won the Burmese–Siamese War against Ayutthaya and the Sino-Burmese War against Qing China.

With Burma preoccupied by the Chinese threat, Ayutthaya recovered its territories by 1770 and went on to capture Lan Na by 1776. Burma and Siam went to war until 1855, but the result was a stalemate, exchanging Tenasserim (to Burma) and Lan Na (to Ayutthaya). Faced with a powerful China and a resurgent Ayutthaya in the east, King Bodawpaya turned west, acquiring Arakan (1785), Manipur (1814), and Assam (1817). It was the second-largest empire in Burmese history, but also one with a long, ill-defined border with British India.

In 1826, Burma lost Arakan, Manipur, Assam, and Tenasserim to the British in the First Anglo-Burmese War. In 1852, the British easily seized Lower Burma in the Second Anglo-Burmese War. King Mindon Min tried to modernise the kingdom and in 1875 narrowly avoided annexation by ceding the Karenni States. The British, alarmed by the consolidation of French Indochina, annexed the remainder of the country in the Third Anglo-Burmese War in 1885.

Konbaung kings extended Restored Toungoo's administrative reforms and achieved unprecedented levels of internal control and external expansion. For the first time in history, the Burmese language and culture came to predominate the entire Irrawaddy valley. The evolution and growth of Burmese literature and theatre continued, aided by an extremely high adult male literacy rate for the era (half of all males and 5% of females). Nonetheless, the extent and pace of reforms were uneven and ultimately proved insufficient to stem the advance of British colonialism.

=== British Burma (1885–1948) ===
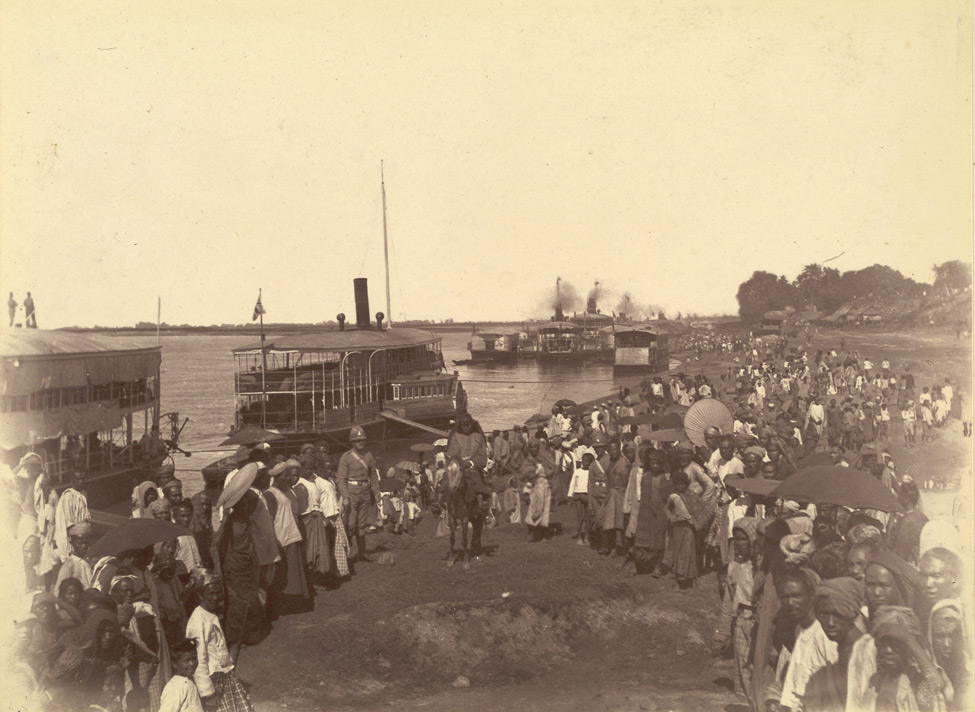
The landing of British forces in Mandalay after the last of the Anglo-Burmese Wars, which resulted in the abdication of the last Burmese monarch, King Thibaw Min

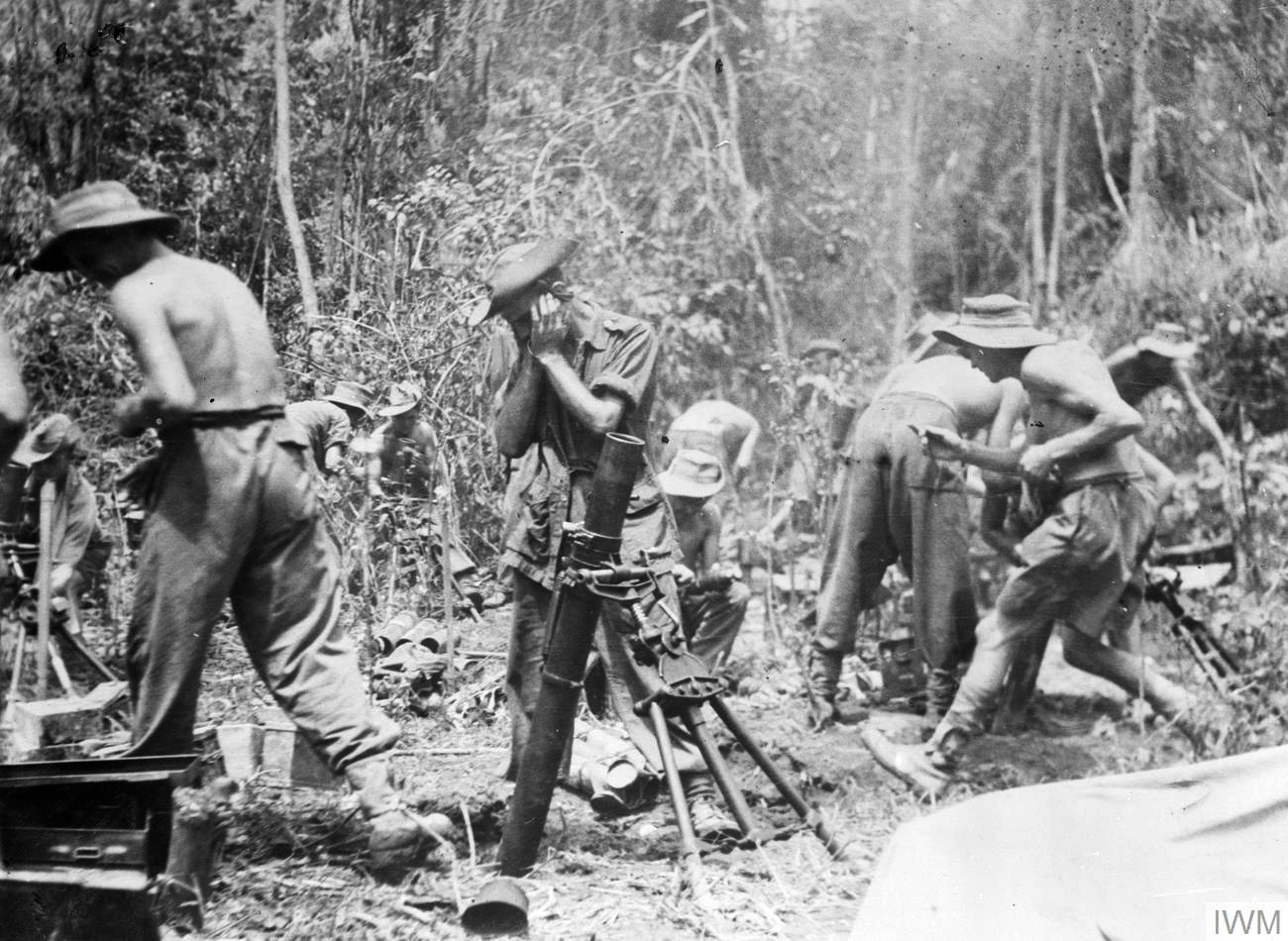
British troops firing a mortar on the Mawchi road, July 1944

In the 19th century, Burmese rulers sought to maintain their traditional influence in the western areas of Assam, Manipur and Arakan. Pressing them, however, was the British East India Company, which was expanding its interests eastwards over the same territory. Over the next 60 years, diplomacy, raids, treaties and compromises, known collectively as the Anglo-Burmese Wars, continued until Britain proclaimed control over most of Burma. With the fall of Mandalay, all of Burma came under British rule, being annexed on 1 January 1886.

Throughout the colonial era, many Indians arrived as soldiers, civil servants, construction workers, and traders and, along with the Anglo-Burmese community, dominated commercial and civil life in Burma. Rangoon became the capital of British Burma and an important port between Calcutta and Singapore. Burmese resentment was strong and was vented in violent riots that periodically paralysed Rangoon until the 1930s. Some of the discontent was caused by a disrespect for Burmese culture and traditions. Buddhist monks became the vanguards of the independence movement. U Wisara, an activist monk, died in prison after a 166-day hunger strike.

On 1 April 1937, Burma became a separately administered colony of Britain, and Ba Maw became the first Prime Minister and Premier of Burma. Ba Maw was an outspoken advocate for Burmese self-rule, and he opposed the participation of Britain, and by extension Burma, in World War II. He resigned from the Legislative Assembly and was arrested for sedition. In 1940, before Japan formally entered the war, Aung San formed the Burma Independence Army in Japan.

As a major battleground, Burma was devastated during World War II by the Japanese invasion. Within months after they entered the war, Japanese troops had advanced on Rangoon, and the British administration had collapsed. A Burmese Executive Administration headed by Ba Maw was established by the Japanese in August 1942. Wingate's British Chindits were formed into long-range penetration groups trained to operate deep behind Japanese lines. A similar American unit, Merrill's Marauders, followed the Chindits into the Burmese jungle in 1943.

Beginning in late 1944, Allied troops launched a series of offensives that led to the end of Japanese rule in July 1945. The battles were intense, with much of Burma laid waste by the fighting. Overall, the Japanese lost some 150,000 men in Burma, with 1,700 prisoners taken. Although many Burmese fought initially for the Japanese as part of the Burma Independence Army, many Burmese, mostly from the ethnic minorities, served in the British Burma Army. The Burma National Army and the Arakan National Army fought with the Japanese from 1942 to 1944 but switched allegiance to the Allied side in 1945. Overall, 170,000 to 250,000 Burmese civilians died during World War II.

Following World War II, Aung San negotiated the Panglong Agreement with ethnic leaders that guaranteed the independence of Burma as a unified state. Aung Zan Wai, Pe Khin, Bo Hmu Aung, Sir Maung Gyi, Sein Mya Maung, Myoma U Than Kywe were among the negotiators of the historic Panglong Conference, which was negotiated with Bamar leader General Aung San and other ethnic leaders in 1947. In 1947, Aung San became Deputy Chairman of the Executive Council of Burma, a transitional government. But in July 1947, political rivals assassinated Aung San and several cabinet members.

=== Independence (1948–1962) ===
On 4 January 1948, the nation became an independent republic, under the terms of the Burma Independence Act 1947. The new country was named the Union of Burma, with Sao Shwe Thaik as its first president and U Nu as its first prime minister. Unlike most other former British colonies and protectorates, Burma did not become a member of the Commonwealth. A bicameral Union Parliament was formed, consisting of a Chamber of Deputies and a Chamber of Nationalities, and multi-party elections were held in 1951–1952, 1956 and 1960.

The geographical area Burma encompasses today can be traced to the Panglong Agreement, which combined Burma Proper, which consisted of Lower Burma and Upper Burma, and the Frontier Areas, which had been administered separately by the British.

In 1961, U Thant, the Union of Burma's Permanent Representative to the United Nations and former secretary to the prime minister, was elected Secretary-General of the United Nations, a position he held for ten years.

When the non-Burman ethnic groups pushed for autonomy or federalism, alongside having a weak civilian government at the centre, the military leadership staged a coup d'état in 1962. Though incorporated in the 1947 Constitution, successive military governments construed the use of the term 'federalism' as being anti-national, anti-unity and pro-disintegration.

=== Military rule (1962–2011) ===
On 2 March 1962, the military led by General Ne Win took control of Burma through a coup d'état, and the government has been under direct or indirect control by the military since then. Between 1962 and 1974, Myanmar was ruled by a revolutionary council headed by the general. Almost all aspects of society (business, media, production) were nationalised or brought under government control under the Burmese Way to Socialism, which combined Soviet-style nationalisation and central planning.

A new constitution of the Socialist Republic of the Union of Burma was adopted in 1974. Until 1988, the country was ruled as a one-party system, with the general and other military officers resigning and ruling through the Burma Socialist Programme Party (BSPP). During this period, Myanmar became one of the world's most impoverished countries. There were sporadic protests against military rule during the Ne Win years, and these were almost always violently suppressed. On 7 July 1962, the government broke up demonstrations at Rangoon University, killing 15 students. In 1974, the military violently suppressed anti-government protests at the funeral of U Thant. Student protests in 1975, 1976, and 1977 were quickly suppressed by overwhelming force.

In 1988, unrest over economic mismanagement and political oppression by the government led to widespread pro-democracy demonstrations throughout the country, known as the 8888 Uprising. Security forces killed thousands of demonstrators, and General Saw Maung staged a coup d'état and formed the State Law and Order Restoration Council (SLORC). In 1989, SLORC declared martial law after widespread protests. The military government finalised plans for People's Assembly elections on 31 May 1989. SLORC changed the country's official English name from the "Socialist Republic of the Union of Burma" to the "Union of Myanmar" on 18 June 1989 by enacting the adaptation of the expression law.

In May 1990, the government held free multiparty elections for the first time in almost 30 years, and the National League for Democracy (NLD), the party of Aung San Suu Kyi, won earning 392 out of a total 492 seats (i.e., 80% of the seats). However, the military junta refused to cede power and continued to rule the nation, first as SLORC and, from 1997, as the State Peace and Development Council (SPDC) until its dissolution in March 2011. General Than Shwe took over the Chairmanship – effectively the position of Myanmar's top ruler – from General Saw Maung in 1992 and held it until 2011.

On 23 June 1997, Myanmar was admitted into the Association of Southeast Asian Nations. On 27 March 2006, the military junta, which had moved the national capital from Yangon to a site near Pyinmana in November 2005, officially named the new capital Naypyidaw, meaning "city of the kings".

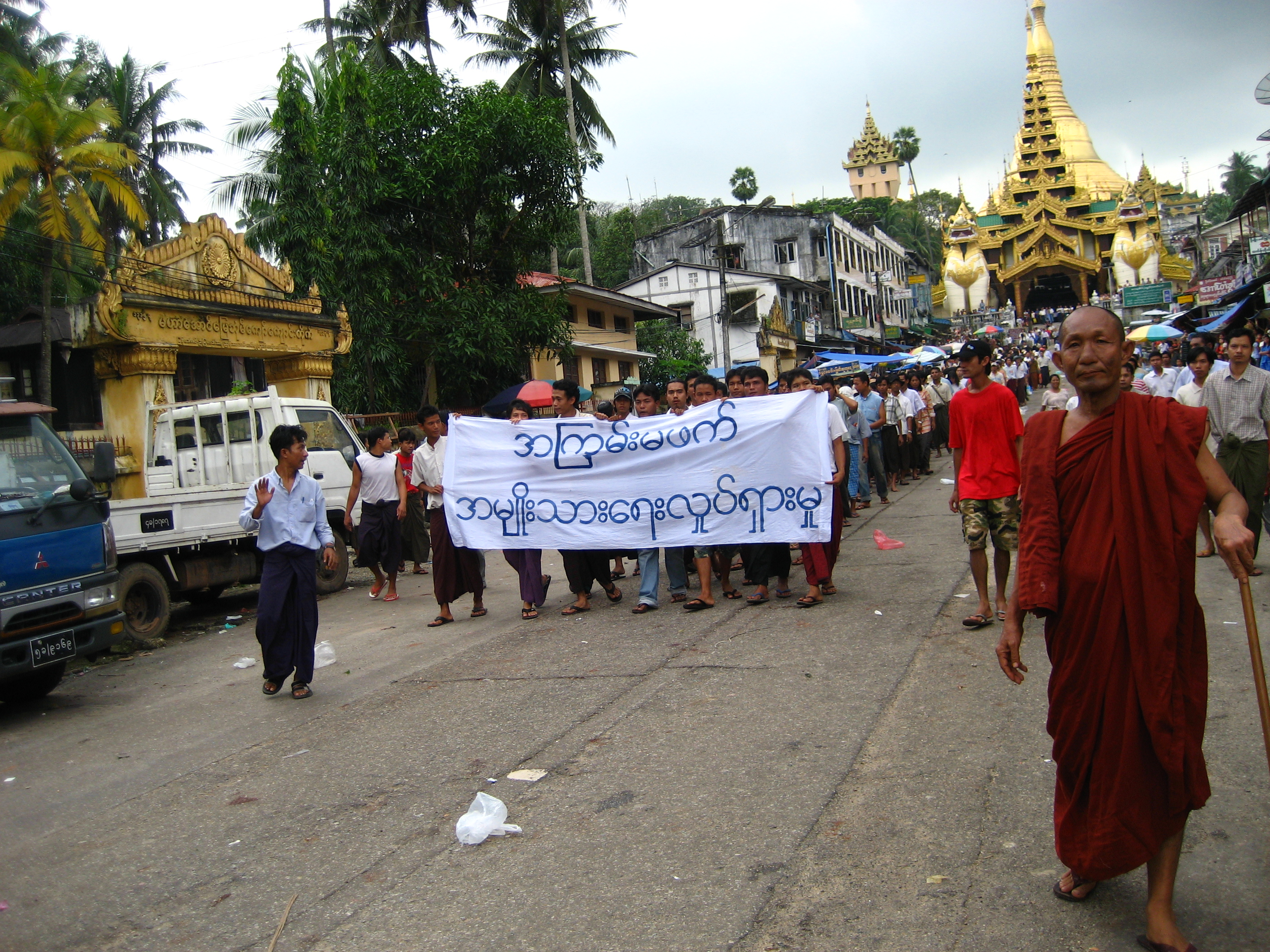
Protesters in Yangon during the 2007 Saffron Revolution with a banner that reads non-violence: national movement in Burmese. In the background is Shwedagon Pagoda.

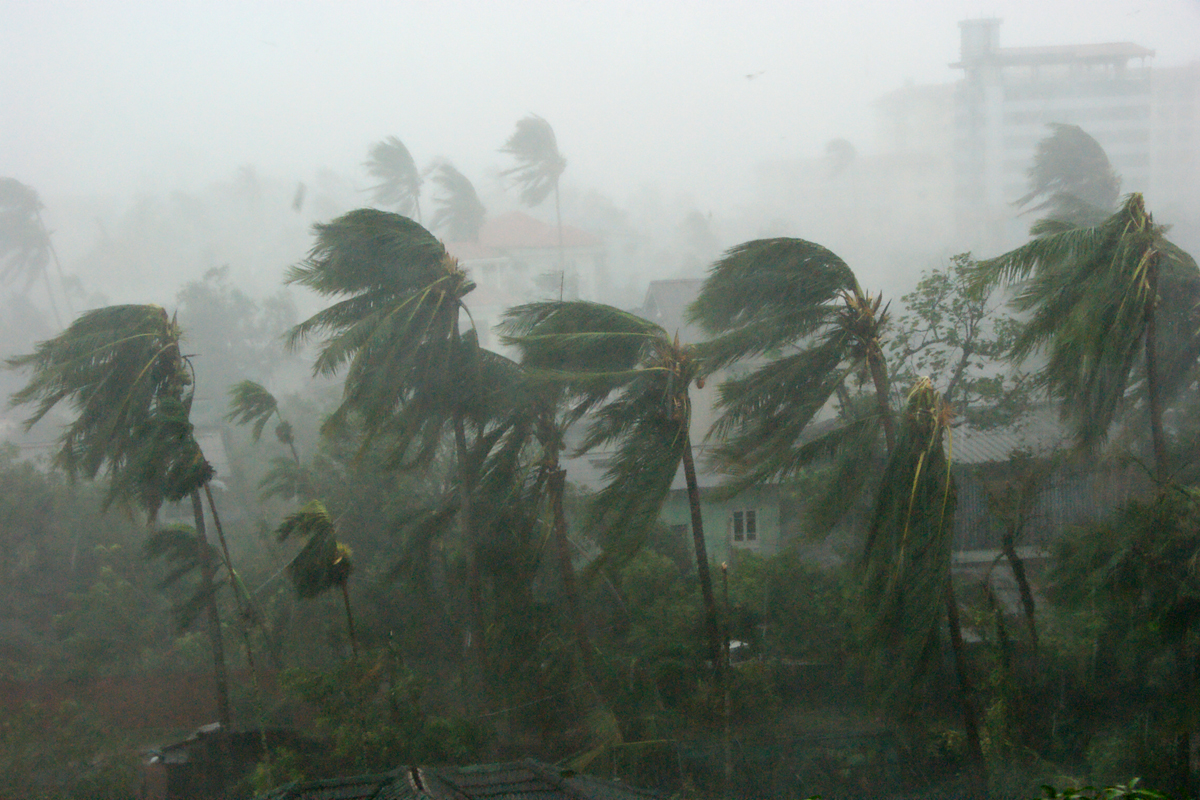
Cyclone Nargis in southern Myanmar, May 2008

In August 2007, an increase in the price of fuel led to the Saffron Revolution led by Buddhist monks, who were dealt with harshly by the government. The government cracked down on them on 26 September 2007, with reports of barricades at the Shwedagon Pagoda and monks killed. There were also rumours of disagreement within the Burmese armed forces, but none were confirmed. The military crackdown against unarmed protesters was faced with broad condemnation internationally, and led to an increase in economic sanctions against the Burmese Government.

In May 2008, Cyclone Nargis caused extensive damage in the densely populated rice-farming delta of the Irrawaddy Division. It was the worst natural disaster in Burmese history with reports of an estimated 200,000 people dead or missing, damages totalled to 10 billion US dollars, and as many as 1 million were left homeless. In the critical days following this disaster, Myanmar's isolationist government was accused of hindering United Nations recovery efforts. Humanitarian aid was requested, but concerns about foreign military or intelligence presence in the country delayed the entry of United States military planes delivering medicine, food, and other supplies.

In early August 2009, a conflict broke out in Shan State in northern Myanmar. For several weeks, junta troops fought against ethnic minorities including the Han Chinese, Wa, and Kachin. During 8–12 August, the first days of the conflict, as many as 10,000 Burmese civilians fled to Yunnan in neighbouring China.

=== Civil wars ===
Civil wars have been a constant feature of Myanmar's socio-political landscape since the attainment of independence in 1948. These wars are predominantly struggles for ethnic and sub-national autonomy, with the areas surrounding the ethnically Bamar central districts of the country serving as the primary geographical setting of conflict. Foreign journalists and visitors require a special travel permit to visit the areas in which Myanmar's civil wars continue.

In October 2012, the ongoing conflicts in Myanmar included the Kachin conflict, between the Pro-Christian Kachin Independence Army and the government; a civil war between the Rohingya Muslims, and the government and non-government groups in Rakhine State; and a conflict between the Shan, Lahu, and Karen minority groups, and the government in the eastern half of the country. In addition, al-Qaeda signalled an intention to become involved in Myanmar.

Armed conflict between ethnic Chinese rebels and the Myanmar Armed Forces resulted in the Kokang offensive in February 2015. The conflict had forced 40,000 to 50,000 civilians to flee their homes and seek shelter on the Chinese side of the border. During the incident, the government of China was accused of giving military assistance to the ethnic Chinese rebels. Clashes between Burmese troops and local insurgent groups have continued, fuelling tensions between China and Myanmar.

=== Period of liberalisation, 2011–2021 ===
The military-backed Government had promulgated a "Roadmap to Discipline-flourishing Democracy" in 1993, but the process appeared to stall several times, until 2008 when the Government published a new draft national constitution, and organised a (flawed) national referendum which adopted it. The new constitution provided for the election of a national assembly with the powers to appoint a president, while practically ensuring army control at all levels.

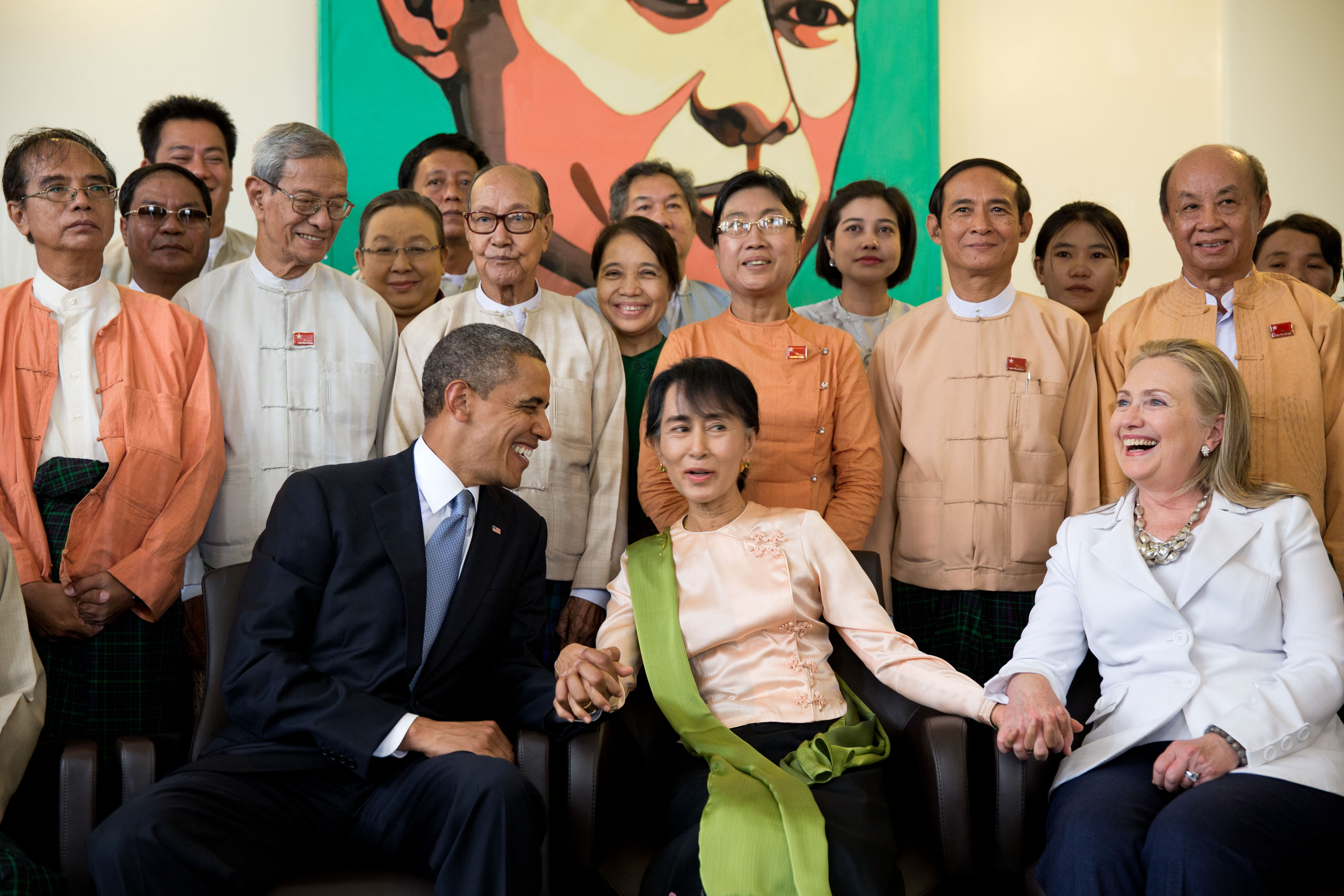
U.S. President Barack Obama and Secretary of State Hillary Clinton with Aung San Suu Kyi and her staff at her home in Yangon, 2012

A general election in 2010 – the first for twenty years – was boycotted by the NLD. The military-backed Union Solidarity and Development Party declared victory, stating that it had been favoured by 80 per cent of the votes; fraud, however, was alleged. A nominally civilian government was then formed, with retired general Thein Sein as president.

A series of liberalising political and economic actions – or reforms – then took place. By the end of 2011, these included the release of pro-democracy leader Aung San Suu Kyi from house arrest, the establishment of the National Human Rights Commission, the granting of general amnesties for more than 200 political prisoners, new labour laws that permitted labour unions and strikes, a relaxation of press censorship, and the regulation of currency practices. In response, United States Secretary of State Hillary Clinton visited Myanmar in December 2011 – the first visit by a US Secretary of State in more than fifty years – meeting both President Thein Sein and opposition leader Aung San Suu Kyi.

Aung San Suu Kyi's NLD party participated in the 2012 by-elections, facilitated by the government's abolition of the laws that previously barred it. In the April 2012 by-elections, the NLD won 43 of the 45 available seats. The 2012 by-elections were also the first time that international representatives were allowed to monitor the voting process in Myanmar.

Myanmar's improved international reputation was indicated by ASEAN's approval of Myanmar's bid for the position of ASEAN chair in 2014.

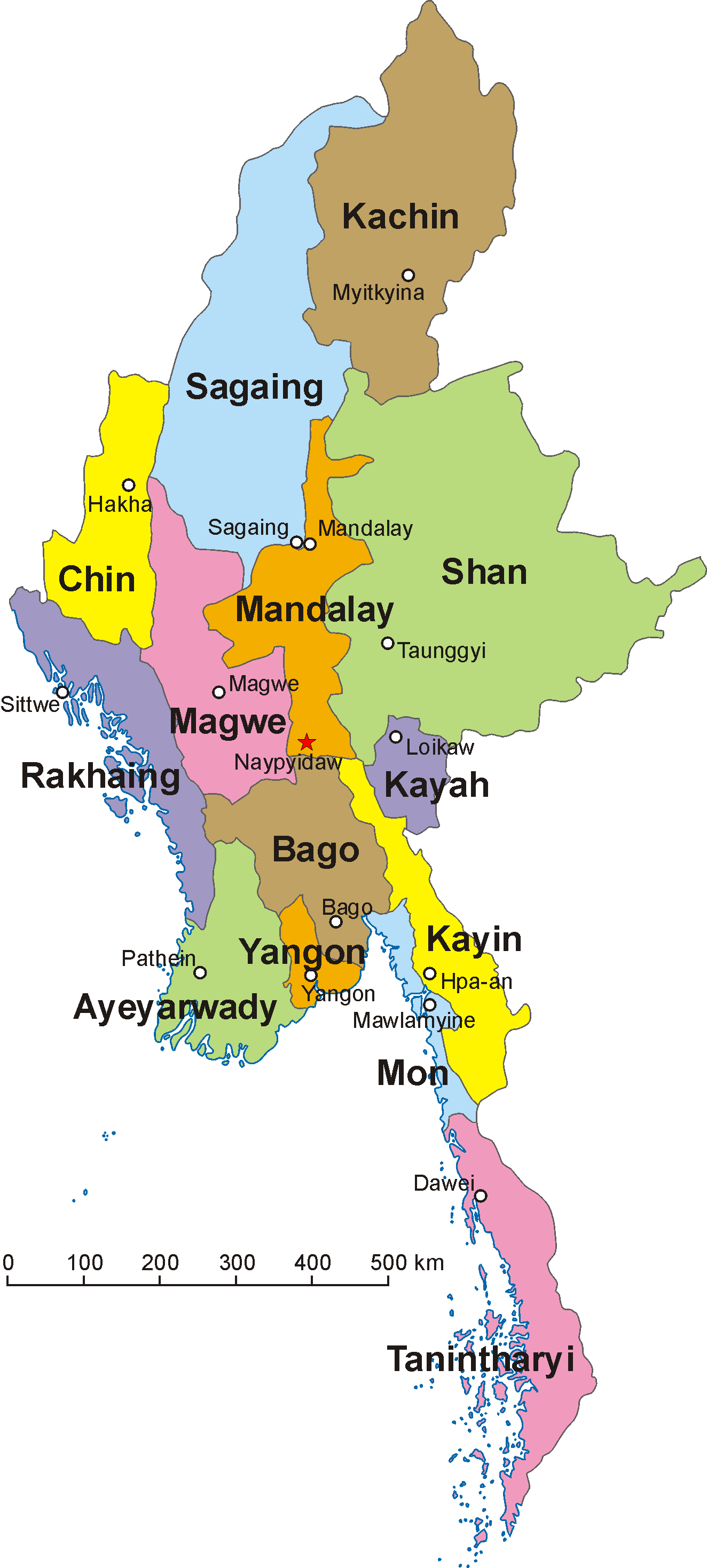
Map of Myanmar and its divisions

==== 2015 general elections ====
General elections were held on 8 November 2015. These were the first openly contested elections held in Myanmar since the 1990 general election (which was annulled). The results gave the NLD an absolute majority of seats in both chambers of the national parliament, enough to ensure that its candidate would become president, while NLD leader Aung San Suu Kyi is constitutionally barred from the presidency.

The new parliament convened on 1 February 2016, and on 15 March 2016, Htin Kyaw was elected as the first non-military president since the military coup of 1962. On 6 April 2016, Aung San Suu Kyi assumed the newly created role of state counsellor, a role akin to a prime minister.

=== Coup d'état and civil war ===
In Myanmar's 2020 parliamentary election, the ostensibly ruling National League for Democracy (NLD), the party of State Counsellor Aung San Suu Kyi, competed with various other smaller parties – particularly the military-affiliated Union Solidarity and Development Party (USDP). Suu Kyi's NLD won the 2020 Myanmar general election on 8 November in a landslide. The USDP, regarded as a proxy for the military, suffered a "humiliating" defeat – even worse than in 2015 – capturing only 33 of the 476 elected seats.

As the election results began emerging, the USDP rejected them, urging a new election with the military as observers. More than 90 other smaller parties contested the vote, including more than 15 who complained of irregularities. Despite this, election observers declared there were no major irregularities. However, despite the election commission validating the NLD's overwhelming victory, the USDP and Myanmar's military persistently alleged fraud. In January 2021, just before the new parliament was to be sworn in, the NLD announced that Suu Kyi would retain her State Counsellor role in the upcoming government.

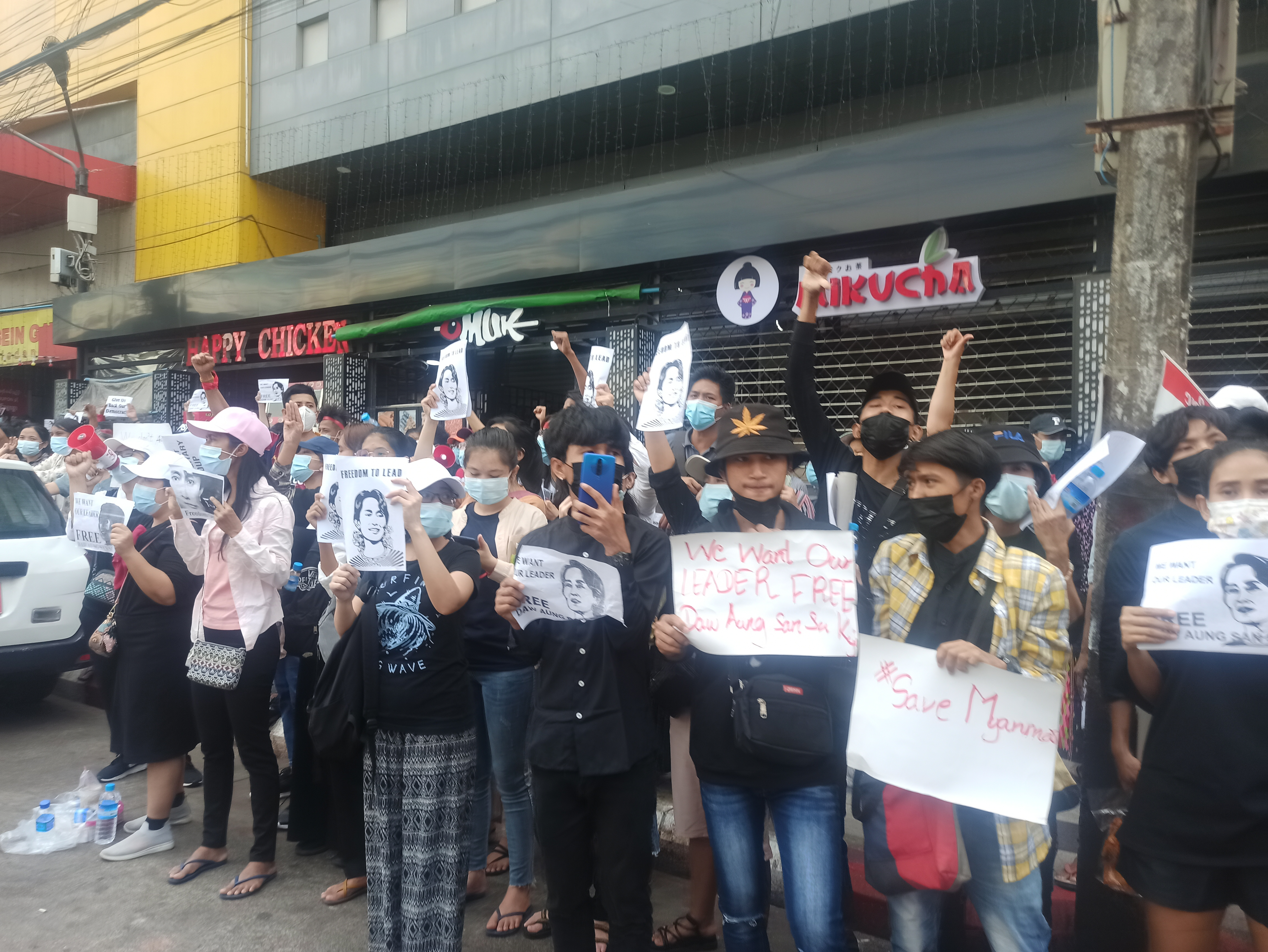
Protesters against the military coup in Myanmar

In the early morning of 1 February 2021, the day parliament was set to convene, the Tatmadaw, Myanmar's military, detained Suu Kyi and other members of the ruling party. The military handed power to military chief Min Aung Hlaing and declared a state of emergency for one year and began closing the borders, restricting travel and electronic communications nationwide. The military announced it would replace the existing election commission with a new one, and a military media outlet indicated new elections would be held in about one year – though the military avoided making an official commitment to that. The military expelled NLD party Members of Parliament from the capital city, Naypyidaw. By 15 March 2021, the military leadership continued to extend martial law into more parts of Yangon, while security forces killed 38 people in a single day of violence.

By the second day of the coup, thousands of protesters were marching in the streets of Yangon, and other protests erupted nationwide, largely halting commerce and transportation. Despite the military's arrests and killings of protesters, the first weeks of the coup found growing public participation, including groups of civil servants, teachers, students, workers, monks and religious leaders – even normally disaffected ethnic minorities.

Military situation in Myanmar as of 12 August 2026. Areas controlled by the Tatmadaw are highlighted in pink.

The coup was immediately condemned by the United Nations Secretary General and leaders of democratic nations. The U.S. threatened sanctions on the military and its leaders, including a "freeze" of US$1 billion of their assets in the U.S. India, Pakistan, Bangladesh, Russia, Vietnam, Thailand, the Philippines and China refrained from criticizing the military coup. A United Nations Security Council resolution called for the release of Aung San Suu Kyi and the other detained leaders – a position shared by the United Nations High Commissioner for Human Rights.

International development and aid partners – business, non-governmental, and governmental – hinted at suspension of partnerships with Myanmar. Banks were closed and social media communications platforms, including Facebook and Twitter, removed Tatmadaw postings. Protesters appeared at Myanmar embassies in foreign countries. On 16 April 2021, pro-democracy politician Min Ko Naing announced the formation of the National Unity Government, with members of ethnic minority groups in senior roles. As part of the announcement he said that ousted leaders Aung San Suu Kyi and Win Myint would retain their positions and asked the international community to recognize their government over the SAC. The National Unity Government then declared the formation of an armed wing on 5 May 2021, a date that is often cited as the start of a full-scale civil war. This armed wing was named the People's Defence Force (PDF) to protect its supporters from military junta attacks and as a first step towards a Federal Union Army. The civil war is ongoing as of 2026.

== Geography ==
Myanmar has a total area of 678,500 square kilometres (262,000 sq mi). It lies between latitudes 9° and 29°N, and longitudes 92° and 102°E. Myanmar is bordered in the northwest by the Chittagong Division of Bangladesh and the Mizoram, Manipur, Nagaland, and Arunachal Pradesh states of India. Its north and northeast border is with the Tibet Autonomous Region and Yunnan for a Sino-Myanmar border total of 2,185 km (1,358 mi). It is bounded by Laos and Thailand to the southeast. Myanmar has 1,930 km (1,200 mi) of contiguous coastline along the Bay of Bengal and Andaman Sea to the southwest and the south, which forms one quarter of its total perimeter.

In the north, the Hengduan Mountains form the border with China. Hkakabo Razi, located in Kachin State, at an elevation of 5,881 metres (19,295 ft), is the highest point in Myanmar. Many mountain ranges, such as the Rakhine Yoma, the Bago Yoma, the Shan Hills and the Tenasserim Hills exist within Myanmar, all of which run north-to-south from the Himalayas. The mountain chains divide Myanmar's three river systems, which are the Irrawaddy, Salween (Thanlwin), and the Sittaung rivers. The Irrawaddy River, Myanmar's longest river at nearly 2,170 kilometres (1,348 mi), flows into the Gulf of Martaban. Fertile plains exist in the valleys between the mountain chains. The majority of Myanmar's population lives in the Irrawaddy valley, which is situated between the Rakhine Yoma and the Shan Plateau.

Myanmar is one of the most seismically prone countries in the world. The Sagaing Fault between the Indian Plate and the Eurasian Plate runs north–south through the center of the country. There have been many small and some big earthquakes with a 7–8 magnitude.

=== Administrative divisions ===
A clickable map of Burma/Myanmar exhibiting its first-level administrative divisions.

Myanmar is divided into seven states (ပြည်နယ်) and seven regions (တိုင်းဒေသကြီး), formerly called divisions. Regions are predominantly Bamar (that is, mainly inhabited by Myanmar's dominant ethnic group). States, in essence, are regions that are home to particular ethnic minorities. The administrative divisions are further subdivided into districts, which are further subdivided into townships, wards, and villages. Since 30 April 2022, districts inside regions and states have been expanded to total count of 121.

Below are the number of districts, townships, cities/towns, wards, village groups and villages in each division and state of Myanmar as of 30 April 2022:

No.	State/Region	Districts	Town ships	Cities/ Towns	Wards	Village groups	Villages
1	Kachin State	6	18	32	172	594	2547
2	Kayah State	4	7	10	44	74	517
3	Kayin State	5	7	18	86	376	2092
4	Chin State	4	9	18	66	464	1347
5	Sagaing Region	10	37	50	271	1755	5989
6	Tanintharyi Region	4	10	18	90	267	1237
7	Bago Region	6	28	52	328	1414	6487
8	Magway Region	7	25	32	199	1538	4788
9	Mandalay Region	11	28	30	280	1415	4799
10	Mon State	4	10	17	106	366	1143
11	Rakhine State	7	17	26	171	1045	3741
12	Yangon Region	14	45	21	743	621	2143
13	Shan State	20	55	86	513	1562	13773
14	Ayeyarwady Region	8	26	45	300	1919	11864
15	Naypyidaw Union Territory	4	8	8	58	187	796
	Total	121	330	463	3427	13597	63268

=== Climate ===
Myanmar map of Köppen climate classification

Much of the country lies between the Tropic of Cancer and the Equator. It lies in the monsoon region of Asia, with its coastal regions receiving over 5,000 mm (196.9 in) of rain annually. Annual rainfall in the delta region is approximately 2,500 mm (98.4 in), while average annual rainfall in the dry zone in central Myanmar is less than 1,000 mm (39.4 in). The northern regions of Myanmar are the coolest, with average temperatures of 21 °C (70 °F). Coastal and delta regions have an average maximum temperature of 32 °C (89.6 °F). Previously and currently analysed data, as well as future projections on changes caused by climate change predict serious consequences to development for all economic, productive, social, and environmental sectors in Myanmar. To combat the hardships ahead and do its part to help combat climate change Myanmar has displayed interest in expanding its use of renewable energy and lowering its level of carbon emissions. Groups involved in helping Myanmar with the transition and move forward include the UN Environment Programme, Myanmar Climate Change Alliance, and the Ministry of Natural Resources and Environmental Conservation, which directed the production of the final draft of the Myanmar national climate change policy that was presented to various sectors of the Myanmar government for review.

In April 2015, it was announced that the World Bank and Myanmar would enter a full partnership framework aimed at improving access to electricity and other basic services for about six million people, and expected to benefit three million pregnant women and children through improved health services. Acquired funding and proper planning has allowed Myanmar to better prepare for the impacts of climate change by enacting programs which teach its people new farming methods, rebuild its infrastructure with materials resilient to natural disasters, and transition various sectors towards reducing greenhouse gas emissions.

=== Biodiversity ===
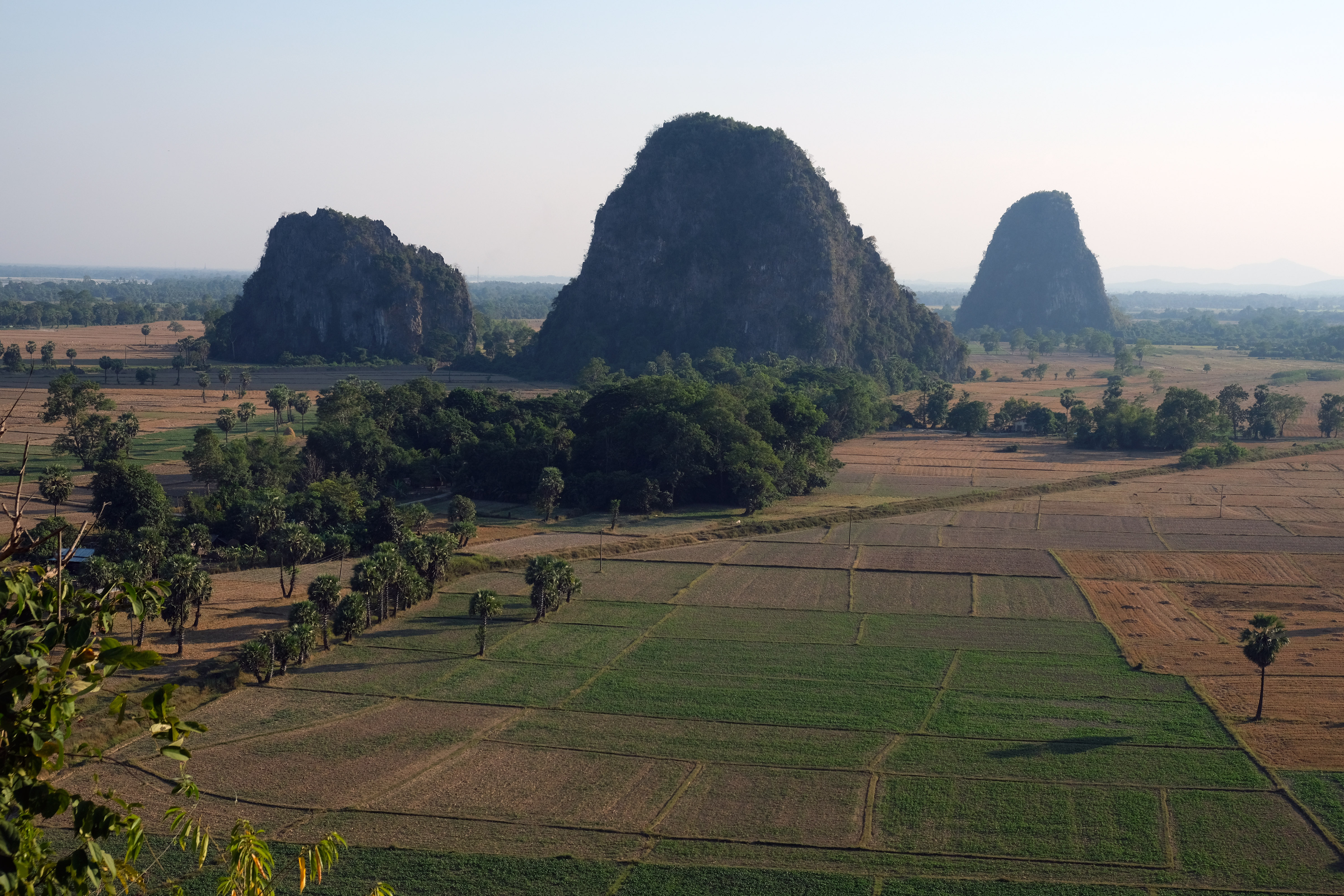
The limestone landscape of Kayin State

Myanmar is a biodiverse country with more than 16,000 plant, 314 mammal, 1131 bird, 293 reptile, and 139 amphibian species, and 64 terrestrial ecosystems including tropical and subtropical vegetation, seasonally inundated wetlands, shoreline and tidal systems, and alpine ecosystems. Myanmar houses some of the largest intact natural ecosystems in Southeast Asia, but the remaining ecosystems are under threat from land use intensification and over-exploitation. According to the IUCN Red List of Ecosystems categories and criteria, more than a third of Myanmar's land area has been converted to anthropogenic ecosystems over the last 2–3 centuries, and nearly half of its ecosystems are threatened. Despite large gaps in information for some ecosystems, there is a large potential to develop a comprehensive protected area network that protects its terrestrial biodiversity.

Myanmar continues to perform badly in the global Environmental Performance Index (EPI) with an overall ranking of 153 out of 180 countries in 2016, among the worst in the South Asian region. The environmental areas where Myanmar performs worst (i.e., highest ranking) are air quality (174), health impacts of environmental issues (143), and biodiversity and habitat (142). Myanmar performs best (i.e., lowest ranking) in environmental impacts of fisheries (21) but with declining fish stocks. Despite several issues, Myanmar also ranks 64 and scores very well (i.e., a high percentage of 93.73%) in environmental effects of the agricultural industry because of excellent management of the nitrogen cycle. Myanmar is one of the most highly vulnerable countries to climate change; this poses several social, political, economic and foreign policy challenges to the country.

Myanmar's slow economic growth has contributed to the preservation of much of its environment and ecosystems. Forests, including dense tropical growth and valuable teak in lower Myanmar, cover over 49% of the country, including areas of acacia, bamboo, ironwood and Magnolia champaca. Coconut and betel palm and rubber have been introduced. In the highlands of the north, oak, pine, and various rhododendrons cover much of the land.

Heavy logging since the new 1995 forestry law went into effect has seriously reduced forest area and wildlife habitat. The lands along the coast support all varieties of tropical fruits and once had large areas of mangroves although much of the protective mangroves have disappeared. In much of central Myanmar (the dry zone), vegetation is sparse and stunted.

Typical jungle animals, particularly tigers, occur sparsely in Myanmar. In upper Myanmar, there are rhinoceros, wild water buffalo, clouded leopard, wild boars, deer, antelope, and elephants, which are also tamed or bred in captivity for use as work animals, particularly in the lumber industry. Smaller mammals are also numerous, ranging from gibbons and monkeys to flying foxes. The abundance of birds is notable with over 800 species, including parrots, myna, peafowl, red junglefowl, weaverbirds, crows, herons, and barn owl. Among reptile species there are crocodiles, geckos, cobras, Burmese pythons, and turtles. Hundreds of species of freshwater fish are wide-ranging, plentiful, and are very important food sources.

== Government and politics ==
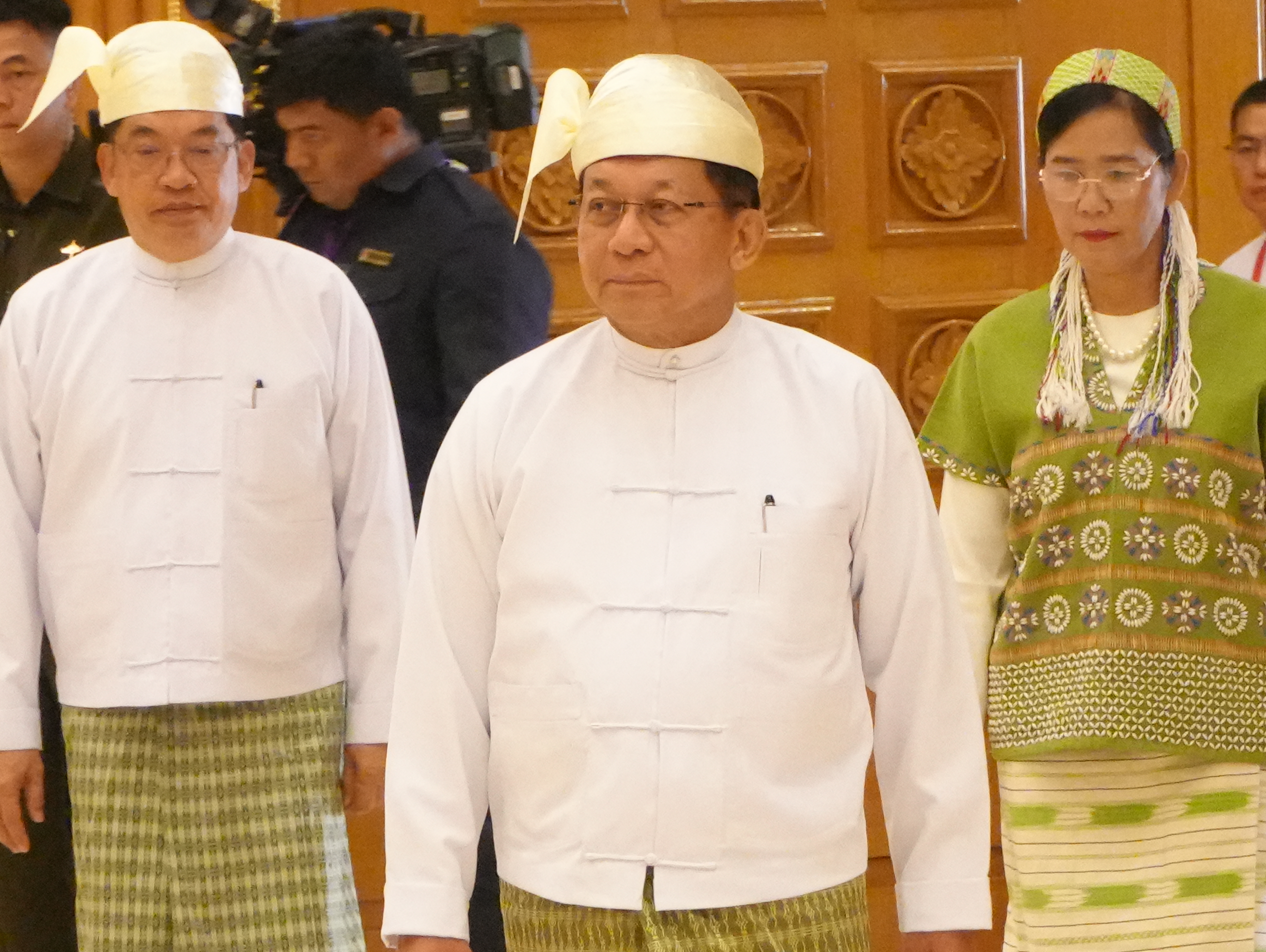
President Min Aung Hlaing (center) flanked by first and second vice-presidents, respectively, Nyo Saw (left) and Nan Ni Ni Aye (right) at the Pyidaungsu Hluttaw in 2026

Myanmar operates as a unitary assembly-independent republic under its 2008 constitution. The country is governed as a parliamentary system with a bicameral legislature (including an executive president accountable to the legislature), with 25% of the legislators appointed by the military and the rest elected in general elections.

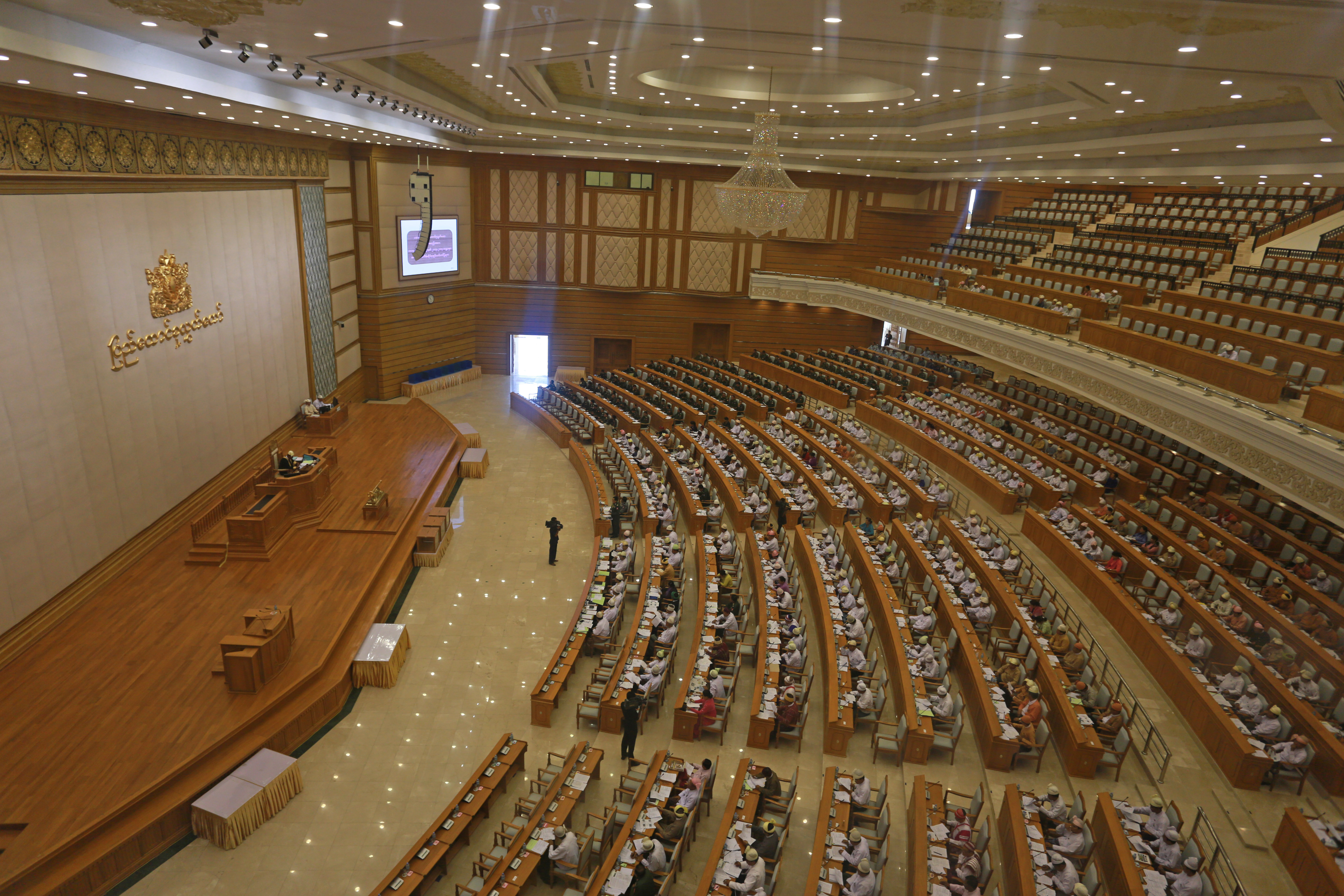
Assembly of the Union (Pyidaungsu Hluttaw)

The legislature, called the Assembly of the Union, is bicameral and made up of two houses: The 224-seat upper House of Nationalities and the 440-seat lower House of Representatives. The upper house consists of 168 members who are directly elected and 56 who are appointed by the Burmese Armed Forces. The lower house consists of 330 members who are directly elected and 110 who are appointed by the armed forces. The President of Myanmar acts as the head of state and the head of government and is elected by the Assembly of the Union.

=== Political culture ===
The major political party is the military-backed Union Solidarity and Development Party. The National League for Democracy was previously a major political party, but it was banned by the junta government in 2023.

Myanmar's army-drafted constitution was approved in a referendum in May 2008. The results, 92.4% of the 22 million voters with an official turnout of 99%, are considered suspect by many international observers and by the National League of Democracy with reports of widespread fraud, ballot stuffing, and voter intimidation. The elections of 2010 resulted in a victory for the military-backed Union Solidarity and Development Party. Various foreign observers questioned the fairness of the elections. One criticism of the election was that only government-sanctioned political parties were allowed to contest in it and the popular National League for Democracy was declared illegal. However, immediately following the elections, the government ended the house arrest of the democracy advocate and leader of the National League for Democracy, Aung San Suu Kyi, and her ability to move freely around the country is considered an important test of the military's movement toward more openness.

The Tatmadaw again seized power in a 2021 coup d'état, which led to the rule of the National Defence and Security Council (NDSC) and its new military junta, the State Administration Council (SAC). The coup, which was widely condemned by the international community, led to continuous ongoing widespread protests in Myanmar and has been marked by violent political repression by the military, as well as the outbreak of a civil war. The military again arrested Aung San Suu Kyi to remove her from public life, and charged her with crimes ranging from corruption to violation of COVID-19 protocols; all of the charges against her are "politically motivated" according to independent observers. The SAC imposed a state of emergency from 2021 to 2025, after which it transferred power back to the NDSC. In the V-Dem Democracy Indices, Myanmar ranks amongst the lowest as a "closed autocracy," ranking at 174th and 176th out of 179 countries in electoral democracy and liberal democracy indices respectively. The country transitioned to a nominally civilian government in 2026 after elections described as a sham process intended to legitimise further military rule.

=== Foreign relations ===
Though the country's foreign relations, particularly with Western nations, have historically been strained, the situation has markedly improved since the reforms following the 2010 elections. After years of diplomatic isolation and economic and military sanctions, the United States relaxed curbs on foreign aid to Myanmar in November 2011 and announced the resumption of diplomatic relations on 13 January 2012 The European Union has placed sanctions on Myanmar, including an arms embargo, cessation of trade preferences, and suspension of all aid with the exception of humanitarian aid.

Sanctions imposed by the United States and European countries against the former military government, coupled with boycotts and other direct pressure on corporations by supporters of the democracy movement, have resulted in the withdrawal from the country of most U.S. and many European companies. Despite Western isolation, Asian corporations have generally remained willing to continue investing in the country and to initiate new investments, particularly in natural resource extraction. The country has close relations with neighbouring India and China, with several Indian and Chinese companies operating in the country. Under India's Act East policy, fields of co-operation between India and Myanmar include remote sensing, oil and gas exploration, information technology, hydropower and construction of ports and buildings. Myanmar also has close political relations with Vietnam and Japan.

In June 2013, Myanmar held its first ever summit, the World Economic Forum on East Asia 2013. A regional spinoff of the annual World Economic Forum in Davos, Switzerland, the summit was held on 5–7 June and attended by 1,200 participants, including 10 heads of state, 12 ministers and 40 senior directors from around the world.

On 19 January 2025, Reuters reported that ASEAN had told Myanmar's military government to prioritise ceasefire, "urging the junta to start dialogue and end hostilities immediately" and "to allow unhindered humanitarian access", citing Malaysia's foreign minister Mohamad Hasan. The ASEAN chair's statement denounced "the continued acts of violence against civilians and public facilities and urged all parties involved" to "immediately halt indiscriminate violence, exercise utmost restraint, ensure the protection and safety of all civilians and civilian infrastructures, and create a conducive environment for the delivery of humanitarian assistance and inclusive national dialogue".

=== Military ===
Since the late 1950s, Myanmar's military has had major roles in Myanmar's politics.

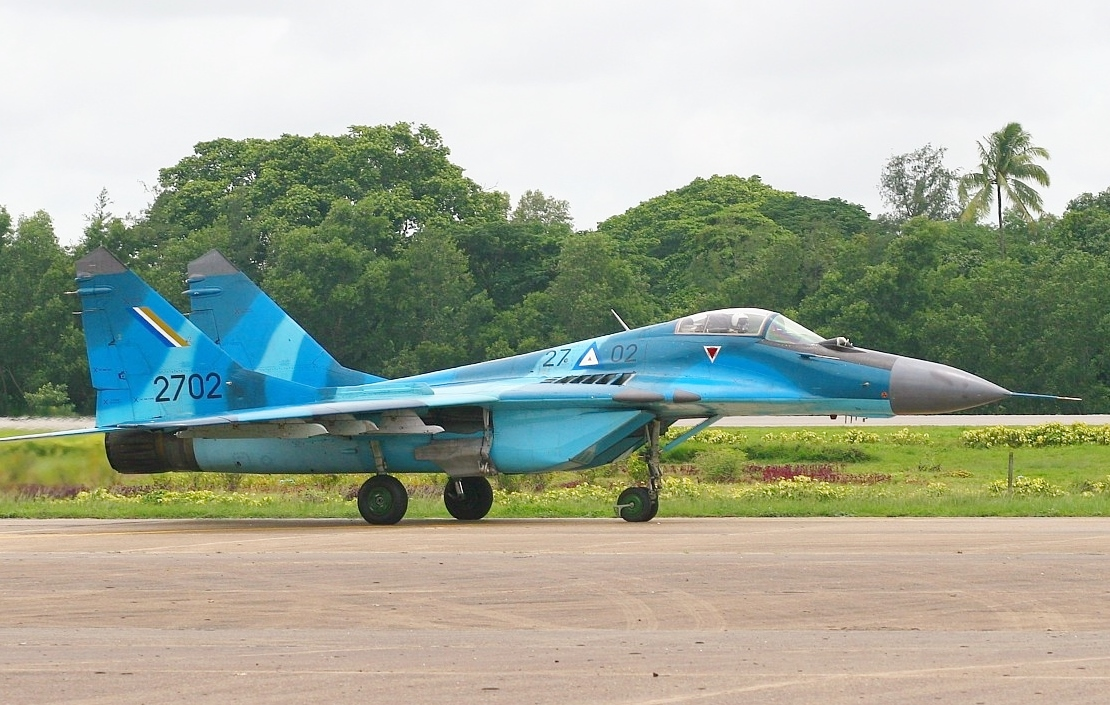
A Myanmar Air Force Mikoyan MiG-29 multirole fighter

Myanmar has received extensive military aid from China in the past. Myanmar has been a member of ASEAN since 1997. Though it gave up its turn to hold the ASEAN chair and host the ASEAN Summit in 2006, it chaired the forum and hosted the summit in 2014. In November 2008, Myanmar's political situation with neighbouring Bangladesh became tense as they began searching for natural gas in a disputed block of the Bay of Bengal. Controversy surrounding the Rohingya population also remains an issue between Bangladesh and Myanmar.

Myanmar's armed forces are known as the Tatmadaw, which numbers 488,000. The Tatmadaw comprises the Army, the Navy, and the Air Force. The country ranked twelfth in the world for its number of active troops in service. The military is very influential in Myanmar, with all top cabinet and ministry posts usually held by military officials. Official figures for military spending are not available. Estimates vary widely because of uncertain exchange rates, but Myanmar's military forces' expenses are high. Myanmar imports most of its weapons from Russia, Ukraine, China, and India.

Myanmar is building a research nuclear reactor near Pyin Oo Lwin with help from Russia. It has been a signatory to the nuclear non-proliferation pact since 1992 and a member of the International Atomic Energy Agency (IAEA) since 1957. The military junta had informed the IAEA in September 2000 of its intention to construct the reactor. In 2010 as part of the leaked diplomatic cables, Myanmar was suspected of using North Korean construction teams to build a fortified surface-to-air missile facility. As of 2019, the United States Bureau of Arms Control assessed that Myanmar is not in violation of its obligations under the Non-Proliferation Treaty but that the Myanmar government had a history of non-transparency on its nuclear programs and aims.

Until 2005, the United Nations General Assembly annually adopted a detailed resolution about the situation in Myanmar by consensus. But in 2006, a divided United Nations General Assembly voted through a resolution that strongly called upon the government of Myanmar to end its systematic violations of human rights. In January 2007, Russia and China vetoed a draft resolution before the United Nations Security Council calling on the government of Myanmar to respect human rights and begin a democratic transition. South Africa also voted against the resolution.

=== Human rights and internal conflicts ===
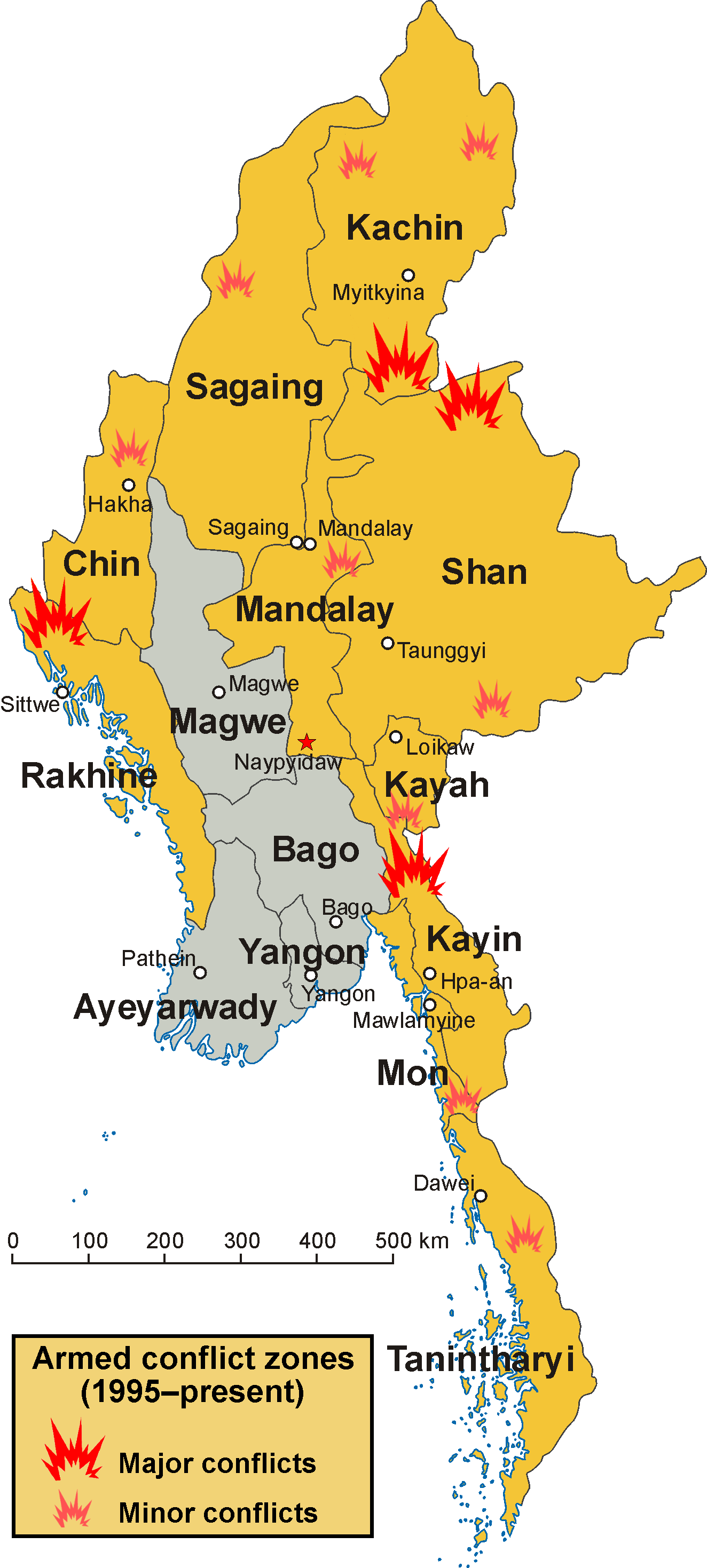
Map of conflict zones in Myanmar. States and regions affected by fighting during and after 1995 are highlighted in yellow.

There is consensus that the former military regime in Myanmar (1962–2010) was one of the world's most repressive and abusive regimes. In November 2012, Samantha Power, Barack Obama's Special Assistant to the President on Human Rights, wrote on the White House blog that "Serious human rights abuses against civilians in several regions continue, including against women and children." Members of the United Nations and major international human rights organisations have issued repeated and consistent reports of widespread and systematic human rights violations in Myanmar. The United Nations General Assembly has repeatedly called on the Burmese military junta to respect human rights and in November 2009 the General Assembly adopted a resolution "strongly condemning the ongoing systematic violations of human rights and fundamental freedoms" and calling on the Burmese military regime "to take urgent measures to put an end to violations of international human rights and humanitarian law."

International human rights organisations including Human Rights Watch and Amnesty International have repeatedly documented and condemned widespread human rights violations in Myanmar. The Freedom in the World 2011 report by Freedom House notes, "The military junta has ... suppressed nearly all basic rights; and committed human rights abuses with impunity." In July 2013, the Assistance Association for Political Prisoners indicated that approximately 100 political prisoners were being held in Burmese prisons. Evidence gathered by a British researcher was published in 2005 regarding the extermination or "Burmisation" of certain ethnic minorities, such as the Karen, Karenni and Shan.

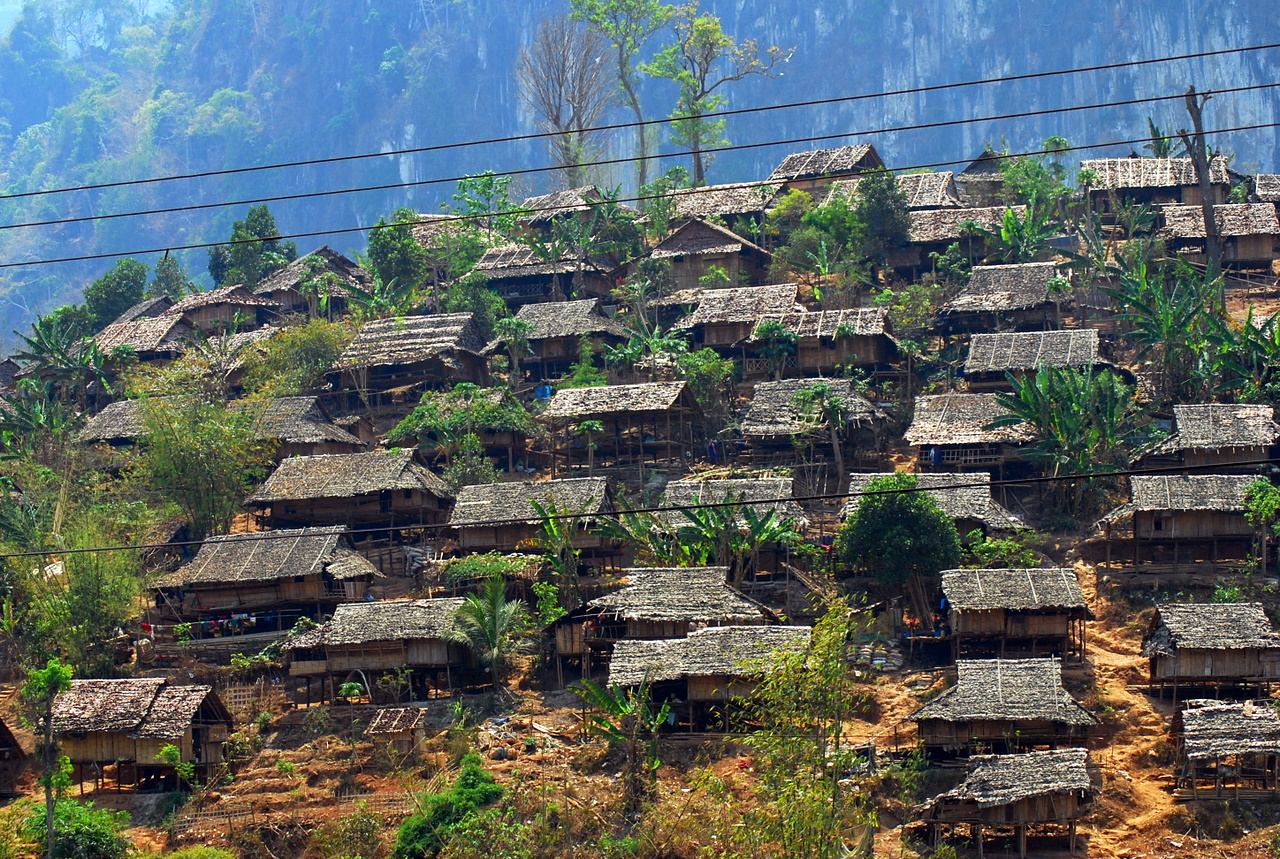
Mae La camp, Tak, Thailand, one of the largest of nine UNHCR camps in Thailand

Based on the evidence gathered by Amnesty photographs and videos of the ongoing armed conflict between the Myanmar military and the Arakan Army (AA), attacks escalated on civilians in Rakhine State. Ming Yu Hah, Amnesty International's Deputy Regional Director for Campaigns said, the UN Security Council must urgently refer the situation in Myanmar to the International Criminal Court. The military is notorious for rampant use of sexual violence.

In November 2024, the ICC prosecutor Karim A.A. Khan KC filed an arrest warrant application of Senior General, Acting President and Commander-in-Chief of the Myanmar Defence Services Min Aung Hlaing for "criminal responsibility for the crimes against humanity of deportation and persecution of the Rohingya, committed in Myanmar, and in part in Bangladesh".

The military takeover in 2021 has further worsened poverty in the country.

The Myanmar government has been alleged to have committed genocide against the Rohingya. The Rohingya people face severe persecution, denied citizenship and basic rights since 1982. Many have been expelled, making them one of the world's most persecuted minorities.

==== Government reforms ====
According to the Crisis Group, since Myanmar transitioned to a new government in August 2011, the country's human rights record has been improving. Previously giving Myanmar its lowest rating of 7, the 2012 Freedom in the World report also notes improvement, giving Myanmar a 6 for improvements in civil liberties and political rights, the release of political prisoners, and a loosening of restrictions. In 2013, Myanmar improved yet again, receiving a score of 5 in civil liberties and 6 in political freedoms.

The government has assembled a National Human Rights Commission that consists of 15 members from various backgrounds. Several activists in exile, including Thee Lay Thee Anyeint members, have returned to Myanmar after President Thein Sein's invitation to expatriates to return home to work for national development. In an address to the United Nations Security Council on 22 September 2011, Myanmar's Foreign Minister Wunna Maung Lwin confirmed the government's intention to release prisoners in the near future.

The government has also relaxed reporting laws, but these remain highly restrictive. In September 2011, several banned websites, including YouTube, Democratic Voice of Burma and Voice of America, were unblocked.

Homosexual acts are illegal in Myanmar and can be punishable by life imprisonment.

== Economy ==
Myanmar's economy is one of the fastest growing economies in the world, with a nominal GDP of US$76.09 billion in 2019 and an estimated purchasing power-adjusted GDP of US$327.629 billion in 2017 according to the World Bank. Foreigners can legally lease but not own property. In December 2014, Myanmar set up its first stock exchange, the Yangon Stock Exchange.

The informal economy's share in Myanmar is one of the biggest in the world and is closely linked to corruption, smuggling, and illegal trade activities. In addition, decades of civil war and unrest have contributed to Myanmar's current levels of poverty and lack of economic progress. Myanmar lacks adequate infrastructure. Goods travel primarily across the Thai border (where most illegal drugs are exported) and along the Irrawaddy River. Notably, opium production in Myanmar is the world's second-largest source of opium after Afghanistan, producing some 25% of the world's opium, forming part of the Golden Triangle. While opium poppy cultivation in Myanmar had declined year-on-year since 2015, cultivation area increased by 33%, totalling 40,100 hectares, alongside an 88% increase in yield potential to 790 tonnes in 2022 according to the latest data from the United Nations Office on Drugs and Crime (UNODC) Myanmar Opium Survey 2022. With that said, the United Nations Office on Drugs and Crime (UNODC) has also warned that opium production in Myanmar may rise again if the economic crunch brought on by COVID-19 and the country's 1 February military coup persists, with significant public health and security consequences for much of Asia. At the same time, the Golden Triangle, and specifically Shan State in Myanmar, is believed to be the largest methamphetamine-producing area in the world. The growing signs of an intensification of methamphetamine manufacturing activity within and around the Golden Triangle, and a corresponding decrease in the number of production facilities dismantled in other parts of the region, suggests that methamphetamine manufacture in East and Southeast Asia is now consolidated into the lower Mekong region. Countries in East and Southeast Asia have collectively witnessed sustained increases in seizures of methamphetamine over the last decade, totalling over 171 tons and a record of over 1 billion methamphetamine tablets in 2021 according to the United Nations Office on Drugs and Crime, more than any other part of the world. In April and May 2020, Myanmar authorities reported Asia's largest ever drug operation in Shan State, totalling what was believed to be 193 million methamphetamine tablets, hundreds of kilogrammes of crystal methamphetamine as well as some heroin, and over 162,000 litres and 35.5 tons of drug precursors as well as sophisticated production equipment and several staging and storage facilities.

Both China and India have attempted to strengthen ties with the government for economic benefit in the early 2010s. Many Western nations, including the United States and Canada, and the European Union, have historically imposed investment and trade sanctions on Myanmar. The United States and European Union eased most of their sanctions in 2012. From May 2012 to February 2013, the United States began to lift its economic sanctions on Myanmar "in response to the historic reforms that have been taking place in that country." Foreign investment comes primarily from China, Singapore, the Philippines, South Korea, India, and Thailand. The military has stakes in some major industrial corporations of the country (from oil production and consumer goods to transportation and tourism).

=== Economic history ===
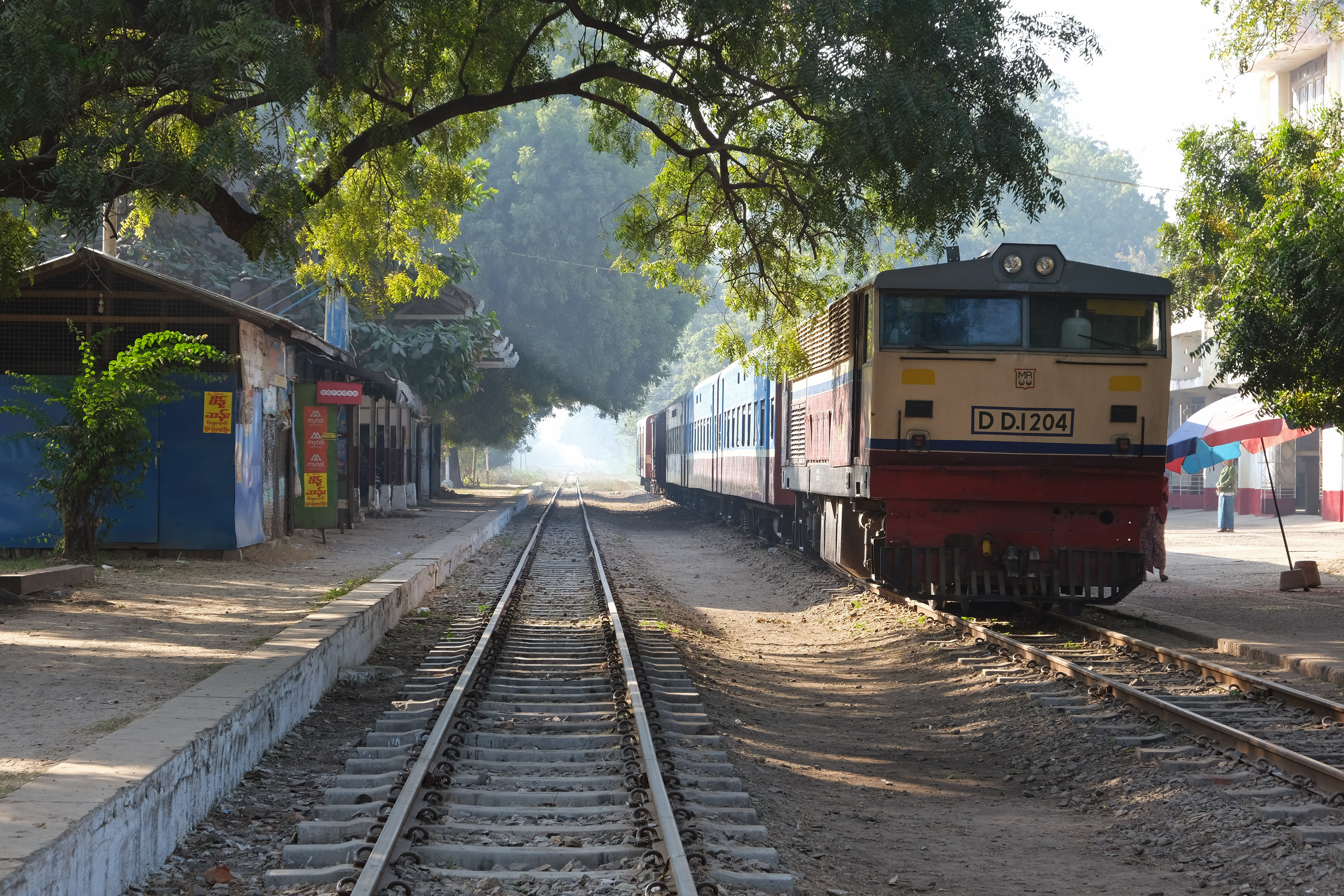
The trains are relatively slow in Myanmar. The railway trip from Bagan to Mandalay takes about 7.5 hours (179 km or 111 mi).

Under the British administration, the people of Burma were at the bottom of the social hierarchy, with Europeans at the top, Indians, Chinese, and Christianised minorities in the middle, and Buddhist Burmese at the bottom. Forcefully integrated into the world economy, Burma's economy grew by involving itself with extractive industries and cash crop agriculture. However, much of the wealth was concentrated in the hands of Europeans. The country became the world's largest exporter of rice, mainly to European markets, while other colonies like India suffered mass starvation. Being a follower of free market principles, the British opened up the country to large-scale immigration with Rangoon exceeding New York City as the greatest immigration port in the world in the 1920s. Historian Thant Myint-U states, "This was out of a total population of only 13 million; it was equivalent to the United Kingdom today taking 2 million people a year." By then, in most of Burma's largest cities, Rangoon, Akyab, Bassein and Moulmein, the Indian immigrants formed a majority of the population. The Burmese under British rule felt helpless, and reacted with a "racism that combined feelings of superiority and fear".

Crude oil production, an indigenous industry of Yenangyaung, was taken over by the British and put under Burmah Oil monopoly. British Burma began exporting crude oil in 1853. European firms produced 75% of the world's teak. The wealth was, however, mainly concentrated in the hands of Europeans. In the 1930s, agricultural production fell dramatically as international rice prices declined and did not recover for several decades. During the Japanese invasion of Burma in World War II, the British followed a scorched earth policy. They destroyed major government buildings, oil wells, and mines that were developed for tungsten (Mawchi), tin, lead, and silver to keep them from the Japanese. Ultimately, Myanmar was bombed extensively by both the Japanese and the Allied powers.

After independence, the country was in ruins, with its major infrastructure destroyed. With the loss of India, Burma lost relevance and obtained independence from the British. After a parliamentary government was formed in 1948, Prime Minister U Nu embarked upon a policy of nationalisation, and the state was declared the owner of all of the land in Burma. The government tried to implement an eight-year plan partly financed by injecting money into the economy, but this caused inflation to rise. The 1962 coup d'état was followed by an economic scheme called the Burmese Way to Socialism, a plan to nationalise all industries, except for agriculture. While the economy continued to grow at a slower rate, the country eschewed a Western-oriented development model, and by the 1980s, was left behind by capitalist powerhouses like Singapore, which were integrated with Western economies. Myanmar asked for admittance to a least developed country status in 1987 to receive debt relief.

=== Agriculture ===
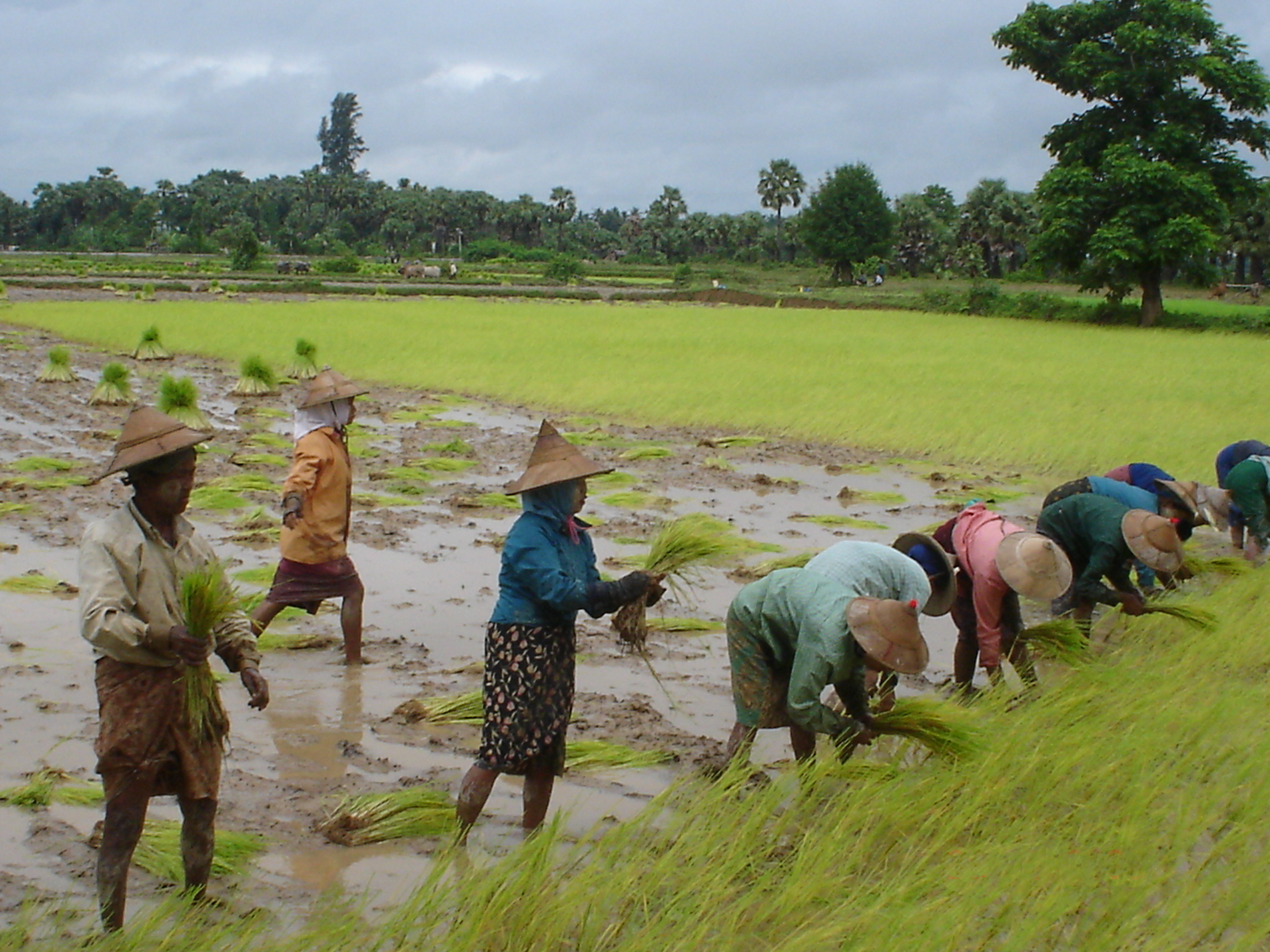
Rice is Myanmar's largest agricultural product.

The major agricultural product is rice, which covers about 60% of the country's total cultivated land area. Rice accounts for 97% of total food grain production by weight. Through collaboration with the International Rice Research Institute, 52 modern rice varieties were released in the country between 1966 and 1997, helping increase national rice production to 14 million tons in 1987 and to 19 million tons in 1996. By 1988, modern varieties were planted on half of the country's rice lands, including 98 percent of the irrigated areas. In 2008, rice production was estimated at 50 million tons.

=== Extractive industries ===
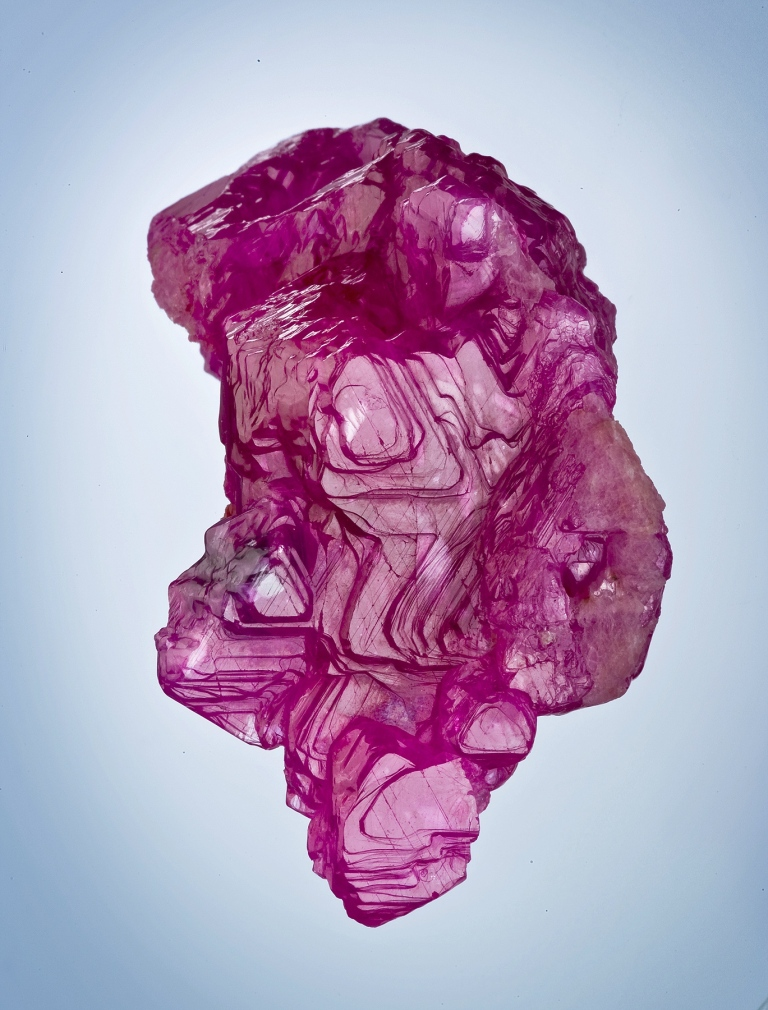
Large ruby (corundum) crystal from Mogok. Size: 5.5 × 3.2 × 3 cm.

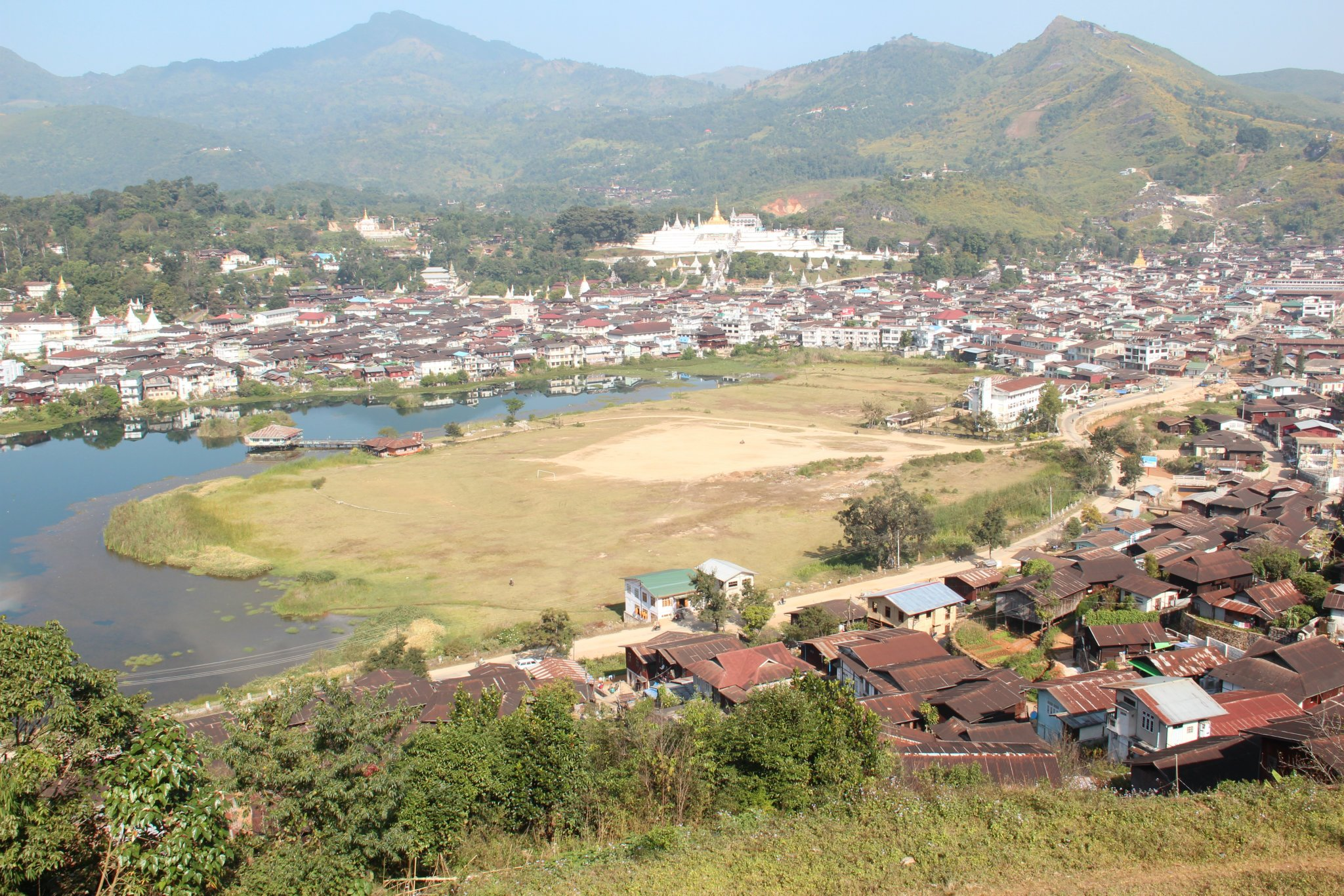
Mogok City

Myanmar produces precious stones such as rubies, sapphires, pearls, and jade. Rubies are the biggest earner; 90% of the world's rubies come from the country, whose red stones are prized for their purity and hue. Thailand buys the majority of the country's gems. Myanmar's "Valley of Rubies", the mountainous Mogok area, 200 km (120 mi) north of Mandalay, is noted for its rare pigeon's blood rubies and blue sapphires.

Many U.S. and European jewellery companies, including Bulgari, Tiffany, and Cartier, refuse to import these stones based on reports of deplorable working conditions in the mines. Human Rights Watch has encouraged a complete ban on the purchase of Burmese gems based on these reports and because nearly all profits go to the junta, as the majority of mining activity in the country is government-run. The government of Myanmar controls the gem trade by direct ownership or by joint ventures with private owners of mines.

Rare-earth elements are also a significant export, as Myanmar supplies around 10% of the world's rare earths. Conflict in Kachin State has threatened the operations of its mines as of February 2021.

Other major industries include the production of agricultural goods, textiles, wood products, construction materials, gems, metals, oil, and natural gas. Myanmar Engineering Society has identified at least 39 locations capable of geothermal power production, and some of these hydrothermal reservoirs lie quite close to Yangon, which is a significant underutilised resource for electrical production.

=== Tourism ===
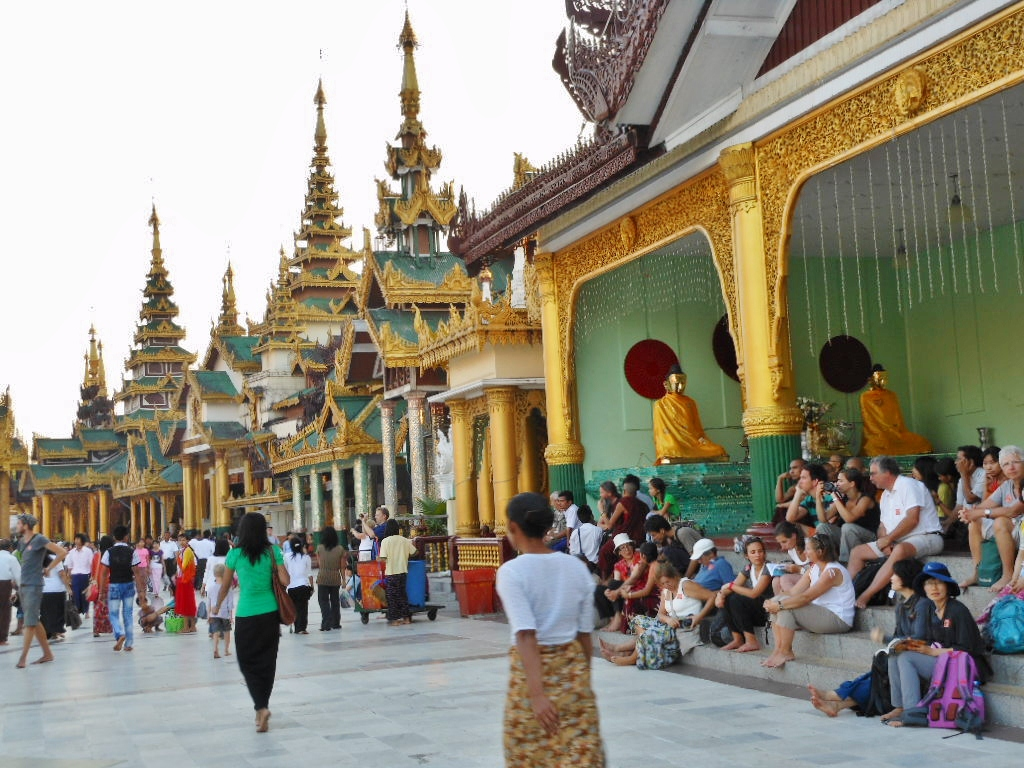
Tourists in Myanmar

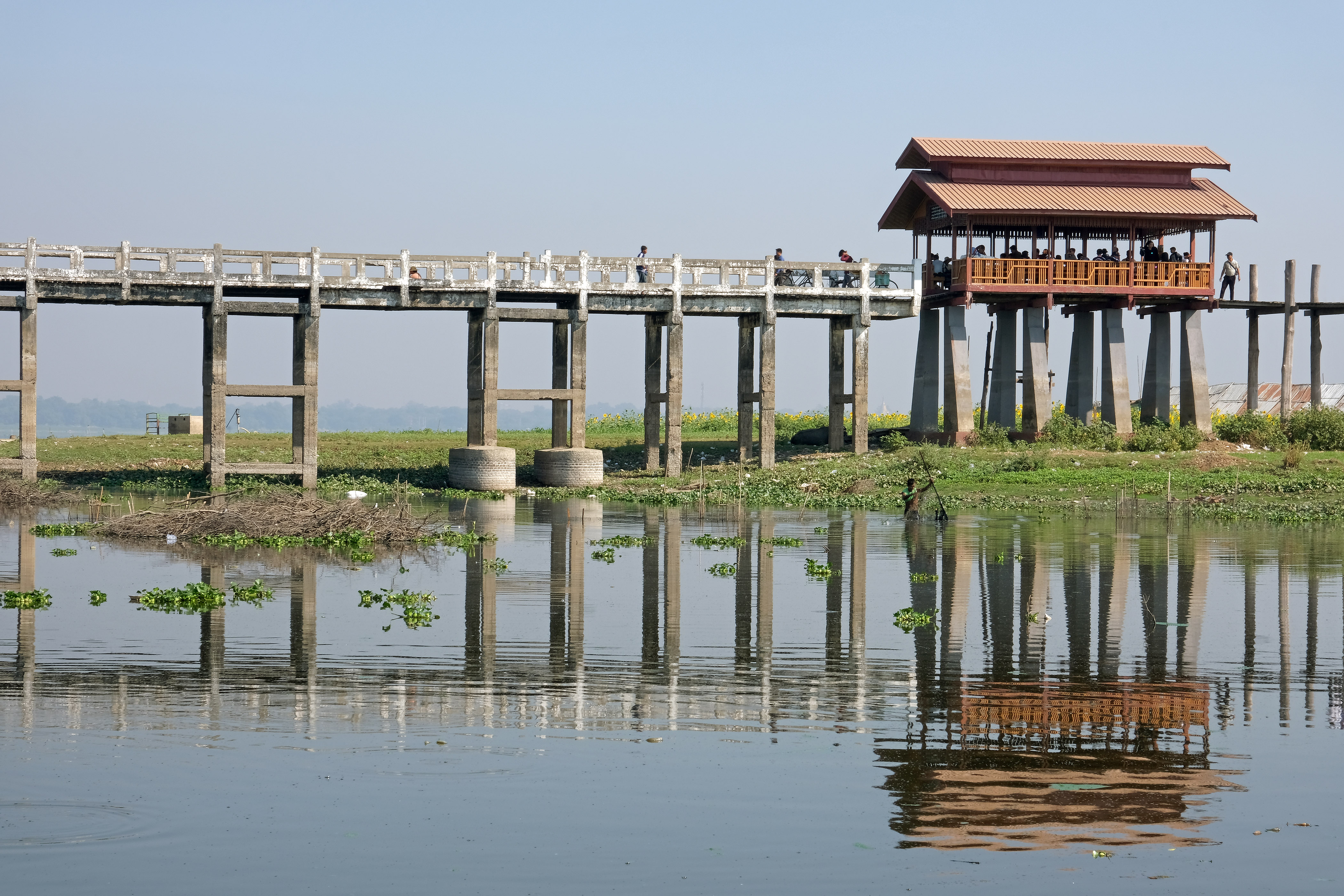
U Bein Bridge in Mandalay

The government receives a significant percentage of the income of private-sector tourism services. The most popular available tourist destinations in Myanmar include big cities such as Yangon and Mandalay; religious sites in Mon State, Pindaya, Bago and Hpa-An; nature trails in Inle Lake, Kengtung, Putao, Pyin Oo Lwin; ancient cities such as Bagan and Mrauk-U; as well as beaches in Nabule, Ngapali, Ngwe-Saung, and Mergui. Nevertheless, much of the country is off-limits to tourists, and interactions between foreigners and the people of Myanmar, particularly in the border regions, are subject to police scrutiny. They are not to discuss politics with foreigners, under penalty of imprisonment, and in 2001, the Myanmar Tourism Promotion Board issued an order for local officials to protect tourists and limit "unnecessary contact" between foreigners and ordinary Burmese people.

The most common way for travellers to enter the country is by air. According to the website Lonely Planet, getting into Myanmar is problematic: "No bus or train service connects Myanmar with another country, nor can you travel by car or motorcycle across the border – you must walk across." They further state that "It is not possible for foreigners to go to/from Myanmar by sea or river." There are a few border crossings that allow the passage of private vehicles, such as the border between Ruili (China) to Mu-se, the border between Htee Kee (Myanmar) and Phu Nam Ron (Thailand)—the most direct border between Dawei and Kanchanaburi, and the border between Myawaddy and Mae Sot, Thailand. At least one tourist company has successfully run commercial overland routes through these borders since 2013.

Flights are available from most countries, though direct flights are limited mainly to Thai and other ASEAN airlines. According to Eleven magazine, "In the past, there were only 15 international airlines and increasing numbers of airlines have begun launching direct flights from Japan, Qatar, Taiwan, South Korea, Germany and Singapore."

== Demographics ==
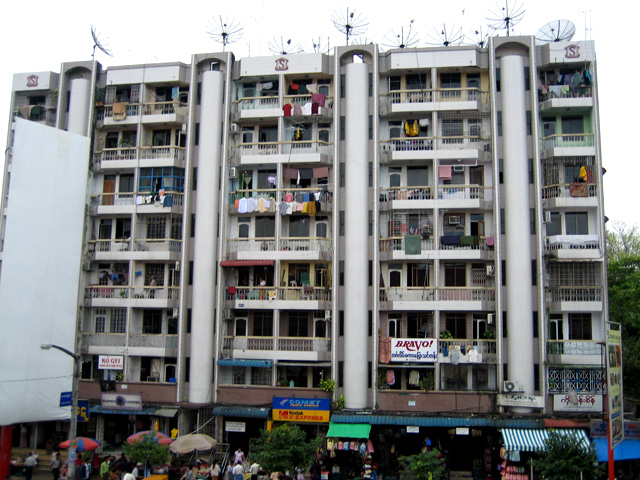
A block of apartments in downtown Yangon, facing Bogyoke Market. Much of Yangon's urban population resides in densely populated flats.

Population
Year	Million
1950	17.1
2000	46.1
2021	53.8

The provisional results of the 2014 Myanmar Census showed that the total population was 51,419,420. This figure includes an estimated 1,206,353 persons in parts of northern Rakhine State, Kachin State and Kayin State who were not counted. People who were out of the country at the time of the census are not included in these figures. There are over 600,000 registered migrant workers from Myanmar in Thailand, and millions more work illegally. Burmese citizens account for 80% of all migrant workers in Thailand. At the beginning of the 20th century, Burma's population was approximately 10 million. The national population density is 76 per square kilometre (200/sq mi), among the lowest in Southeast Asia.

Myanmar's fertility rate in 2011 was 2.23, slightly above the replacement level and low compared to Southeast Asian countries of similar economic standing. There has been a significant decline in fertility in the 2000s, from a rate of 4.7 children per woman in 1983, down to 2.4 in 2001, despite the absence of any national population policy. The fertility rate is much lower in urban areas.

The relatively rapid decline in fertility is attributed to several factors, including extreme delays in marriage (almost unparalleled among developing countries in the region), the prevalence of illegal abortions, and the high proportion of single, unmarried women of reproductive age, with 25.9% of women aged 30–34 and 33.1% of men and women aged 25–34 being single.

These patterns stem from economic dynamics, including high income inequality, which results in residents of reproductive age opting for delay of marriage and family-building in favour of attempting to find employment and establish some form of wealth; the average age of marriage in Myanmar is 27.5 for men, 26.4 for women.

=== Largest cities ===
Largest cities or towns in Myanmar geohive.com
Rank	Name	Division	Pop.
1	Yangon	Yangon	5,211,431
2	Mandalay	Mandalay	1,225,546
3	Naypyidaw	Naypyidaw	1,160,242
4	Bago	Bago	491,434
5	Hpa-An	Kayin	421,575
6	Taunggyi	Shan	381,636
7	Monywa	Sagaing	372,095
8	Myitkyina	Kachin	306,949
9	Mawlamyine	Mon	289,388
10	Magway	Magway	289,247

=== Ethnic groups ===
Ethnic composition in Burma/Myanmar (rough estimate)
Ethnic group	Percent
Bamar	68%
Shan	10%
Karen	7%
Rakhine	3.5%
Han-Chinese	3%
Mon	2%
Indians	2%
Kachin	1.5%
Chin	1%
Kayah	0.8%
Other groups	5%

Ethnolinguistic groups of Burma/Myanmar

Myanmar is ethnically diverse. The government recognises 135 distinct ethnic groups. There are at least 108 different ethnolinguistic groups in Myanmar, consisting mainly of distinct Tibeto-Burman peoples, but with sizeable populations of Tai–Kadai, Hmong–Mien, and Austroasiatic (Mon–Khmer) peoples.

Ethnic identity in modern-day Myanmar has been significantly shaped by British colonial rule, Christian missionaries, and decolonisation in the post-independence era. To this day, the Burmese language does not have precise terminology that distinguishes the European concepts of race and ethnicity; the term lu-myo (လူမျိုး, lit. 'type of person') can reference race, ethnicity, and religion. For instance, many Bamar self-identify as members of the 'Buddhist lu-myo' or the 'Myanmar lu-myo,' which has posed a significant challenge for census-takers.

The Bamar form an estimated 68% of the population. 10% of the population are Shan. The Kayin make up 7% of the population. The Rakhine people constitute 4% of the population. Overseas Chinese form approximately 3% of the population. Myanmar's ethnic minority groups prefer the term "ethnic nationality" over "ethnic minority" as the term "minority" furthers their sense of insecurity in the face of what is often described as "Burmanisation"—the proliferation and domination of the dominant Bamar culture over minority cultures.

Mon, who form 2% of the population, are ethno-linguistically related to the Khmer. Overseas Indians are 2%. The remainder are Kachin, Chin, Rohingya, Anglo-Indians, Gurkha, Nepali and other ethnic minorities. Included in this group are the Anglo-Burmese. Once forming a large and influential community, the Anglo-Burmese left the country in steady streams from 1958 onwards, principally to Australia and the United Kingdom. It is estimated that 52,000 Anglo-Burmese remain in Myanmar. As of 2009, 110,000 Burmese refugees were living in refugee camps in Thailand.

Refugee camps exist along the Indian, Bangladeshi, and Thai borders, while several thousand are in Malaysia. Conservative estimates state that there are over 295,800 minority refugees from Myanmar, with the majority being Rohingya, Karen, and Karenni, who are principally located along the Thai-Myanmar border. There are nine permanent refugee camps along the Thai-Myanmar border, most of which were established in the mid-1980s. The refugee camps are under the care of the Thai-Burma Border Consortium (TBBC). Since 2006, over 55,000 Burmese refugees have been resettled in the United States.

The persecution of Burmese Indians, Burmese Chinese, and other ethnic groups after the military coup headed by General Ne Win in 1962 led to the expulsion or emigration of 300,000 people. They migrated to escape racial discrimination and the wholesale nationalisation of private enterprise that took place in 1964. The Anglo-Burmese at this time either fled the country or changed their names and blended in with the broader Burmese society.

Many Rohingya Muslims have fled Myanmar. Many refugees headed to neighbouring Bangladesh, including 200,000 in 1978 as a result of the King Dragon operation in Arakan. 250,000 more left in 1991. Since August 2017, an estimated 23,000–43,700 Rohingya have been killed in the ongoing Rohingya genocide, and another 730,000 have fled to Bangladesh.

=== Languages ===
Myanmar is home to four major language families: Sino-Tibetan, Tai–Kadai, Austroasiatic, and Indo-European. Sino-Tibetan languages are most widely spoken. They include Burmese, Karen, Kachin, Chin, and Chinese (mainly Hokkien). The primary Tai–Kadai language is Shan. Mon, Palaung, and Wa are the major Austroasiatic languages spoken in Myanmar. The two major Indo-European languages are Pali, the liturgical language of Theravada Buddhism, and English. More than a hundred languages are spoken in total. Since many of them are known only within small tribes around the country, they may have been lost (many, if not all) after a few generations.

Burmese, the mother tongue of the Bamar and official language of Myanmar, is related to Tibetan and Chinese. It is written in a script consisting of circular and semi-circular letters, which were adapted from the Mon script, which in turn was developed from a southern Indian script in the 5th century. The earliest known inscriptions in the Burmese script date from the 11th century. It is also used to write Pali, the sacred language of Theravada Buddhism, as well as several ethnic minority languages, including Shan, several Karen dialects, and Kayah (Karenni), with the addition of specialised characters and diacritics for each language.

=== Religion ===
Religion in Myanmar
Religion	Percentage
Buddhism	87.9%
Christianity	6.2%
Islam	4.3%
Hinduism	0.5%
Tribal religions	0.8%
Other	0.2%
No religion	0.1%
Source: 2014 Myanmar census

Although the country is predominantly Buddhist, significant numbers of people practice other recognized religions in Myanmar. Religious edifices and orders have been in existence for many years. The Christian and Muslim populations do, however, face religious persecution, and it is hard, if not impossible, for non-Buddhists to join the army or get government jobs, which represent the main routes to success and social advancement in the country. Persecution and targeting of civilians and religious minorities are particularly notable in eastern Myanmar, where over 3,000 villages have been destroyed in the past ten years. More than 200,000 Muslims have fled to Bangladesh by 2007 to escape persecution.

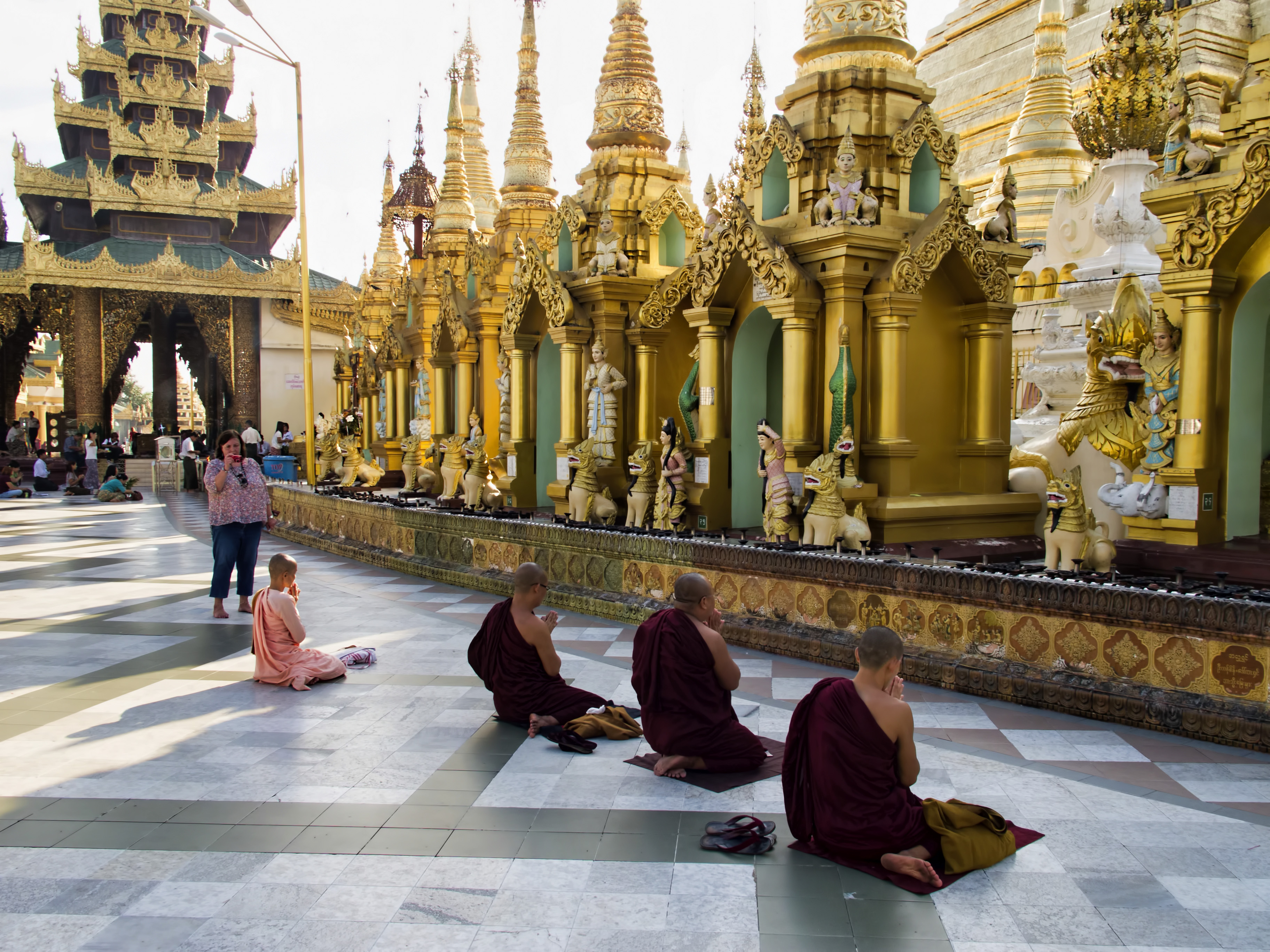
Praying Buddhist monks in Shwedagon Pagoda

A large majority of the population practices Buddhism; estimates range from 80% to 89%. According to the 2014 Myanmar Census, 87.9% of the population identifies as Buddhists. Theravāda Buddhism is the most widespread. There are some 500,000 Buddhist monks and 75,000 nuns in this country of 54 million. Other religions are practised largely without obstruction, with the notable exception of some religious minorities such as the Rohingya people, who have continued to have their citizenship status denied and treated as illegal immigrants instead, and Christians in Chin State. According to 2014 census, 6.2% of the population identifies as Christian; 4.3% as Muslim; 0.8% as followers of tribal religions; 0.5% as Hindus; 0.2% as followers of other religions; and 0.1% follow no religion. According to the 2010 estimates of the Pew Research Center, 7% of the population is Christian; 4% is Muslim; 1% follows traditional animistic beliefs; and 2% follow other religions, including Mahayana Buddhism, Hinduism, and East Asian religions. Jehovah's Witnesses have been present since 1914 and have about 80 congregations around the country and a branch office in Yangon publishing in 16 languages. A tiny Jewish community in Yangon had a synagogue but no resident rabbi.

Although Hinduism is practised by 0.5% of the population, it was a major religion in Myanmar's past. Burmese folk religion is practised by many Bamars alongside Buddhism.

=== Health ===
The general state of health care in Myanmar is poor. The government spends anywhere from 0.5% to 3% of the country's GDP on health care, consistently ranking among the lowest in the world. Although health care is nominally free, in reality, patients have to pay for medicine and treatment, even in public clinics and hospitals. Public hospitals lack many of the basic facilities and equipment. The 2010 maternal mortality rate per 100,000 births for Myanmar is 240. This is compared with 219.3 in 2008 and 662 in 1990. The under-5 mortality rate, per 1,000 births, is 73, and the neonatal mortality as a percentage of under-5 mortality is 47. According to Doctors without Borders, 25,000 Burmese AIDS patients died in 2007, deaths that could largely have been prevented by antiretroviral therapy drugs and proper treatment.

HIV/AIDS, recognised as a disease of concern by the Myanmar Ministry of Health, is most prevalent among sex workers and intravenous drug users. In 2005, the estimated adult HIV prevalence rate in Myanmar was 1.3% (200,000–570,000 people), according to UNAIDS, and early indicators of any progress against the HIV epidemic are inconsistent. However, the National AIDS Programme Myanmar found that 32% of sex workers and 43% of intravenous drug users in Myanmar have HIV.

=== Education ===
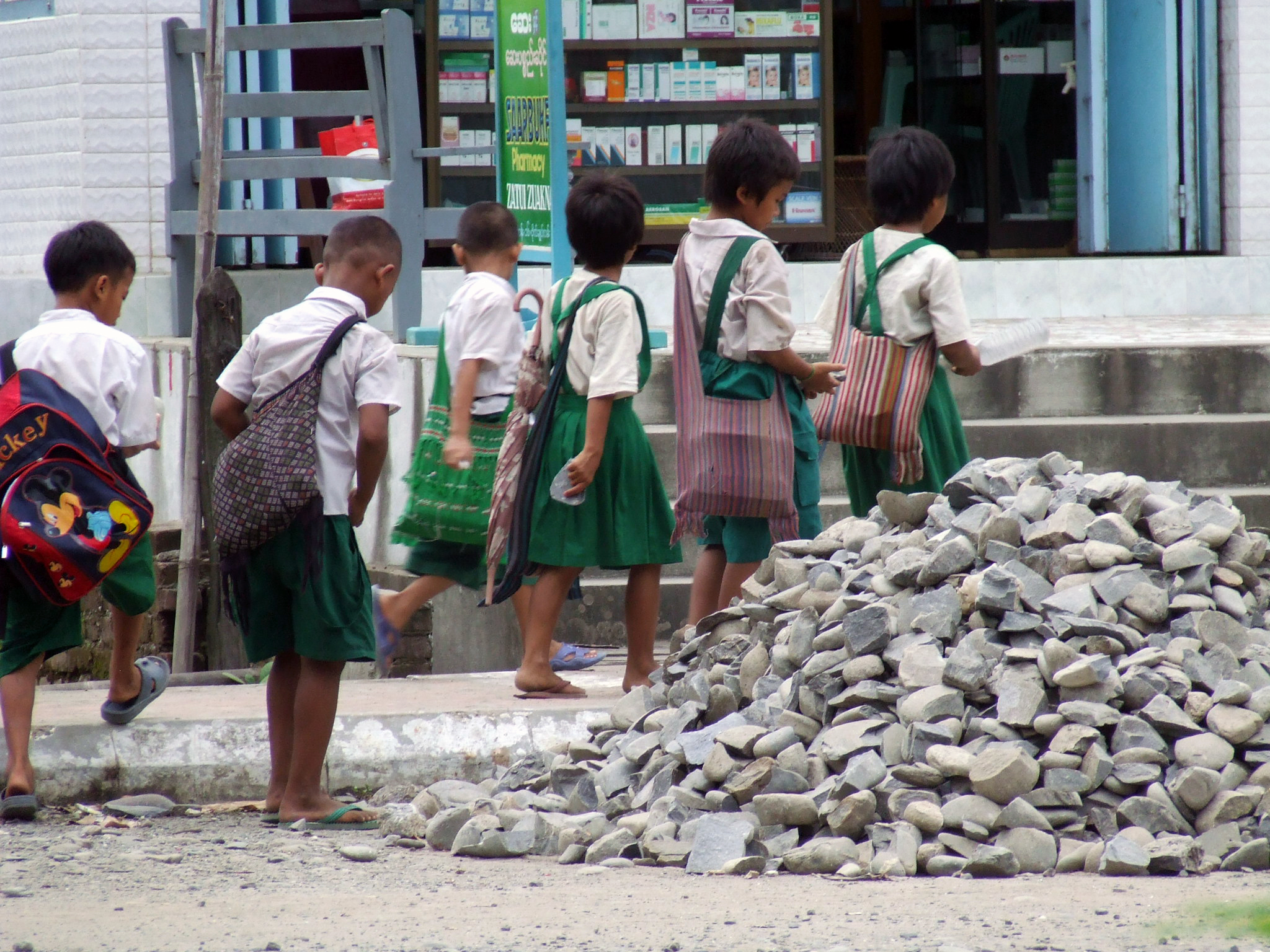
Students on their way to school, Kalaymyo, Sagaing Region, Myanmar

According to the UNESCO Institute of Statistics, Myanmar's official literacy rate as of 2000 was 90%. Historically, Myanmar has had high literacy rates. The educational system of Myanmar is operated by the government agency, the Ministry of Education. The education system is based on the United Kingdom's system after nearly a century of British and Christian presence in Myanmar. Nearly all schools are government-operated, but there has been an increase in privately funded English language schools in the early 21st century. Schooling is compulsory until the end of elementary school, approximately 9 years old, while the compulsory schooling age is 15 or 16 at the international level.

There are 101 universities, 12 institutes, 9 degree colleges, and 24 colleges in Myanmar, a total of 146 higher education institutions. There are 10 technical training schools, 23 nursing training schools, 1 sport academy, and 20 midwifery schools. There are four international schools acknowledged by WASC and the College Board—The International School Yangon, Myanmar International School, Yangon International School, and International School of Myanmar in Yangon. Myanmar was ranked 122nd in the Global Innovation Index in 2025.

=== Crime ===
Myanmar had a murder rate of 15.2 per 100,000 population with a total of 8,044 murders in 2012. Factors influencing Myanmar's high murder rate include communal violence and armed conflict. Myanmar is one of the world's most corrupt nations according to the 2024 Transparency International Corruption Perceptions Index, which ranked the country at number 168, out of 180 countries in total. Myanmar is the world's largest producer of opium, producing some 25% of the world's opium, and forms part of the Golden Triangle. The opium industry was a monopoly during colonial times and has since been illegally operated by corrupt officials in the Burmese military and rebel fighters, primarily as the basis for heroin manufacture. Myanmar is the largest producer of methamphetamines in the world, with the majority of Ya ba found in Thailand produced in Myanmar, particularly in the Golden Triangle and northeastern Shan State, which borders Thailand, Laos, and China. Burmese-produced ya ba is typically trafficked to Thailand via Laos, before being transported through the northeastern Thai region of Isan.

== Culture ==
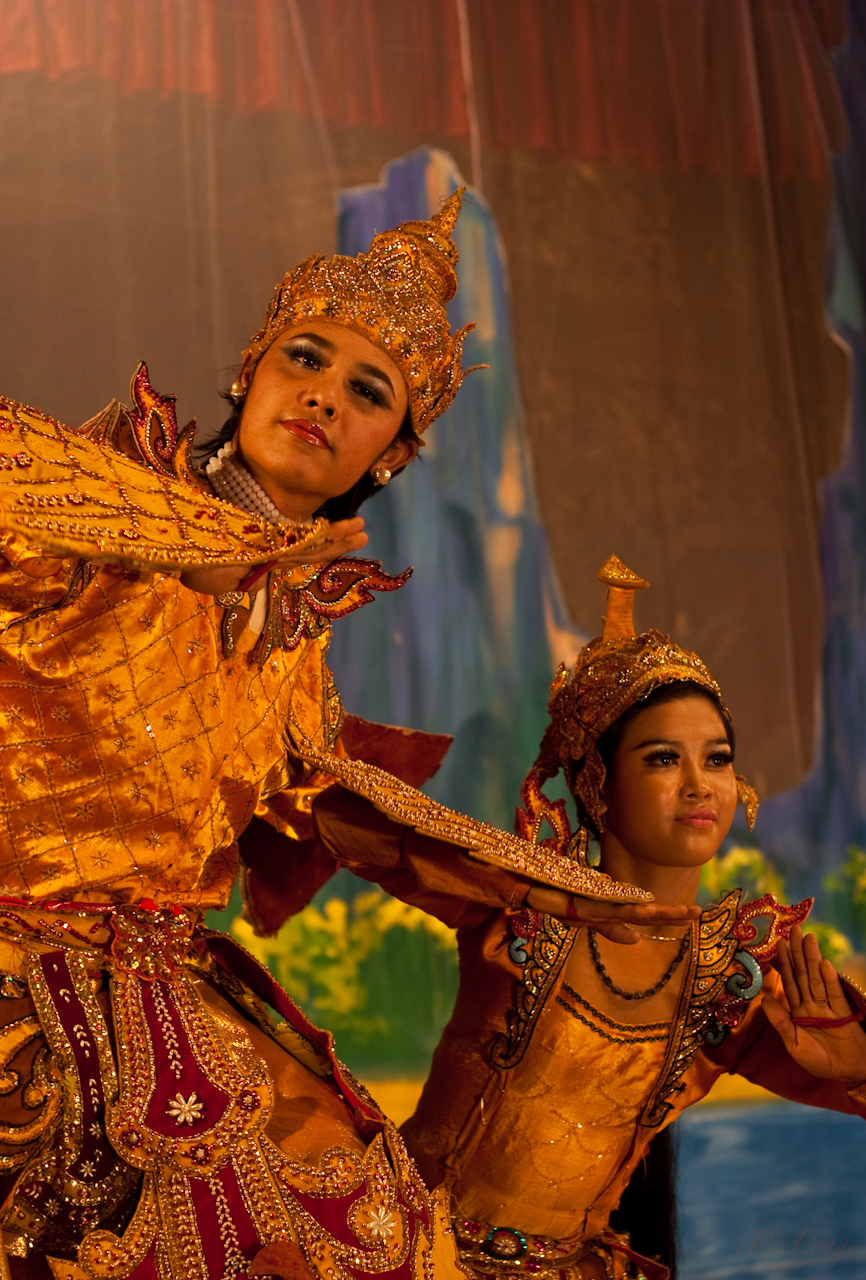
Burmese Kinnayi Kinnaya dance

A diverse range of indigenous cultures exists in Myanmar, with the majority culture primarily Buddhist and Bamar. Bamar culture has been influenced by the cultures of neighbouring countries, manifested in its language, cuisine, music, dance, and theatre. The arts, particularly literature, have historically been influenced by the local form of Theravada Buddhism. Considered the national epic of Myanmar, the Yama Zatdaw, an adaptation of India's Ramayana, has been influenced greatly by Thai, Mon, and Indian versions of the play. Buddhism is practised along with nat worship, which involves elaborate rituals to propitiate one from a pantheon of 37 nats.

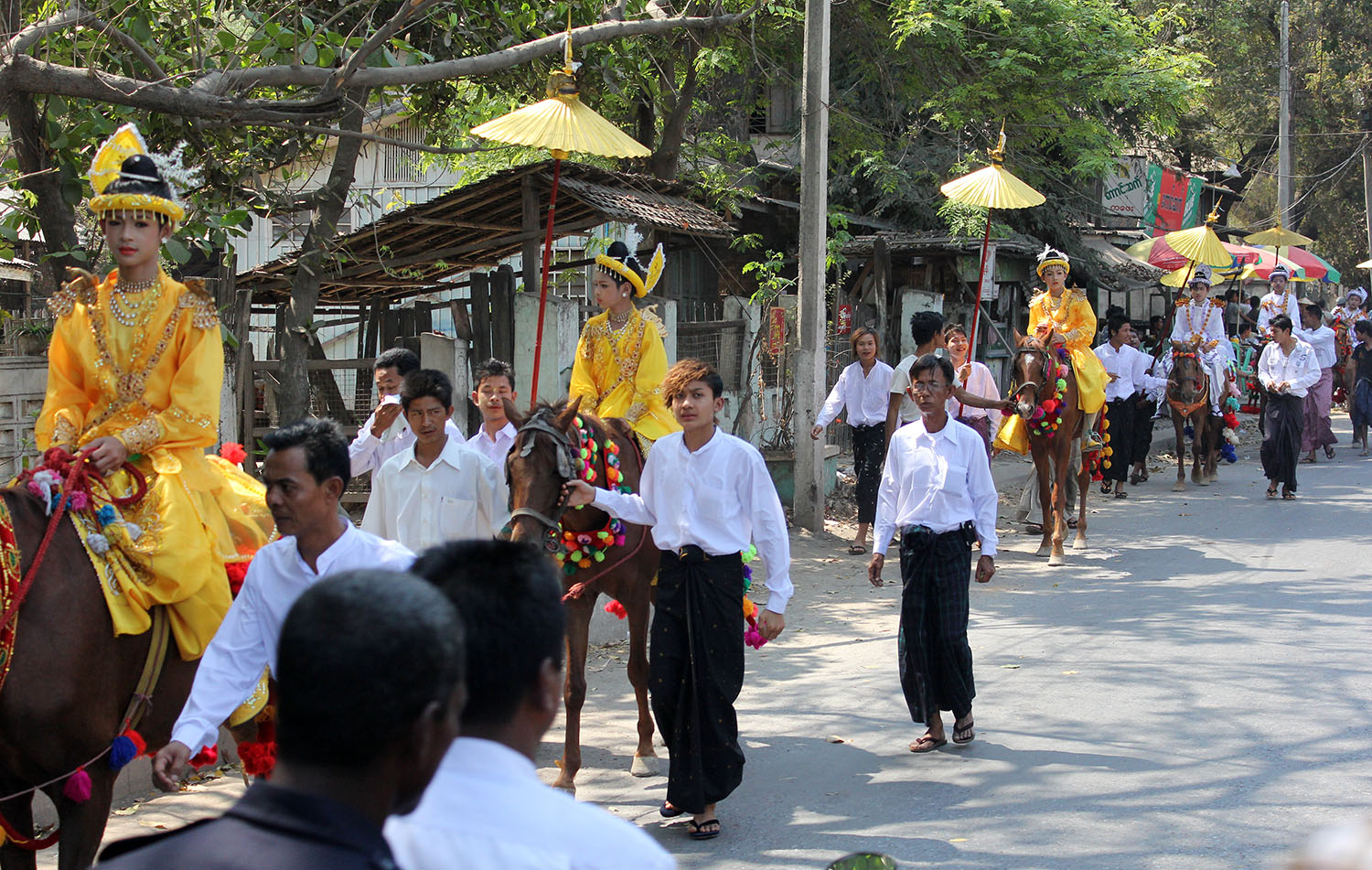
A Buddhist Shinbyu ceremony in Mandalay

In a traditional village, the monastery is the centre of cultural life. Monks are venerated and supported by the lay people. A novitiation ceremony called shinbyu is the most important coming of age event for a boy, during which he enters the monastery for a short time. All male children in Buddhist families are encouraged to be a novice (beginner for Buddhism) before the age of twenty and to be a monk after the age of twenty. Girls have ear-piercing ceremonies (နားသ) at the same time. Burmese culture is most evident in villages where local festivals are held throughout the year, the most important being the pagoda festival. Many villages have a guardian nat, and superstition and taboos are commonplace.

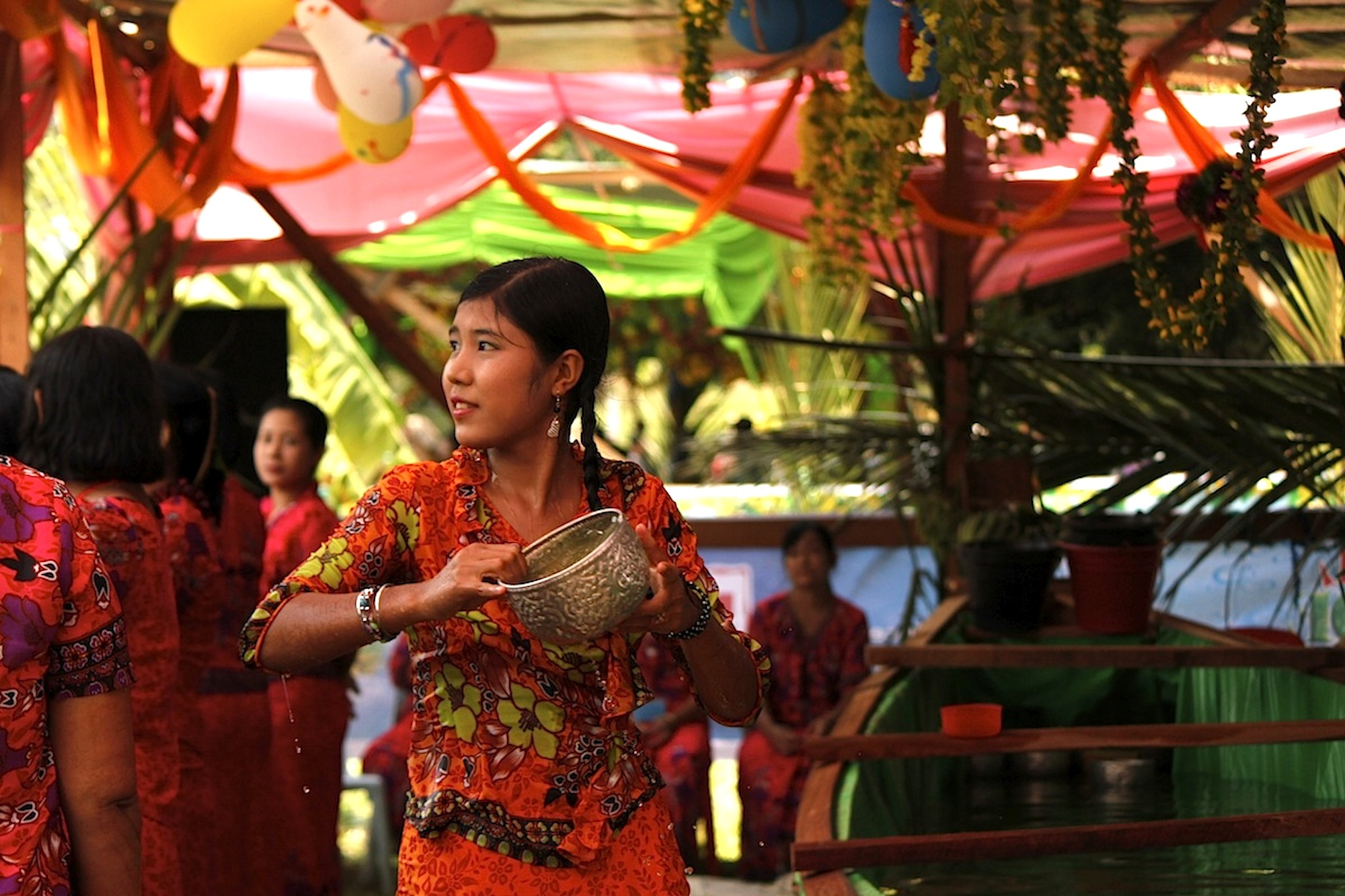
An Arakan (Rakhine) girl pours water at travellers during the Burmese New Year Thingyan Water Festival in Yangon.

British colonial rule introduced Western elements of culture to Myanmar. Myanmar's education system is modelled after that of the United Kingdom. Colonial architectural influences are most evident in major cities such as Yangon. Many ethnic minorities, particularly the Karen in the southeast and the Kachin and Chin, who populate the far western state of Chin and the north and northeast, practice Christianity. According to The World Factbook, the Burman population is 68% while other ethnic minorities groups constitute 32%. In contrast, the exiled leaders and organizations claim that 40% of the population is composed of ethnic minorities.

=== Cuisine ===
Burmese cuisine is characterised by extensive use of fish products such as fish sauce, ngapi (fermented seafood), and dried prawns. Mohinga is the traditional breakfast dish and is Myanmar's national dish. Seafood is a common ingredient in coastal cities, while meat and poultry are more commonly used in landlocked cities like Mandalay. Freshwater fish and shrimp have been incorporated into inland cooking as a primary source of protein and are used in a variety of ways: fresh, salted whole or filleted, salted and dried, made into a salty paste, or fermented sour and pressed. Burmese cuisine also includes a variety of salads (a thoke), centred on one major ingredient, ranging from starches like rice, wheat and rice noodles, glass noodles and vermicelli, to potato, ginger, tomato, kaffir lime, long bean, and lahpet (pickled tea leaves).

=== Sport ===
The Lethwei, Bando, Banshay, and Pongyi thaing martial arts and chinlone are traditional sports in Myanmar. Football is played all over the country, even in villages, and its national team is ruled by the Myanmar Football Federation. The 2013 Southeast Asian Games took place in Naypyidaw, Yangon, Mandalay, and Ngwesaung Beach in December, representing the third occasion that the event has been staged in Myanmar. Myanmar previously hosted the games in 1961 and 1969.

=== Art ===
Burmese traditional art concepts are popular and respected by the Burmese people and people from abroad. Burmese contemporary art has developed quite rapidly on its own terms. Artists born after the 1980s have had greater chances of practicing art outside the country.

One of the first to study Western art was Ba Nyan. Together with Ngwe Gaing and a handful of other artists, they were the pioneers of the Western painting style. Later on, most young children learned the concepts from them. Some well known contemporary artists are Lun Gywe, Aung Kyaw Htet, MPP Yei Myint, Myint Swe, Min Wai Aung, Aung Myint, Kin Maung Yin, Po Po and Zaw Zaw Aung.

=== Media and communications ===
Because of Myanmar's political climate, there are not many media companies in relation to the country's population. Some are privately owned. All programming must meet the approval of the censorship board. The Burmese government announced on 20 August 2012 that it would stop censoring media before publication. Following the announcement, newspapers and other outlets no longer required approval from state censors; however, journalists in the country can still face consequences for what they write and say. In April 2013, international media reports were published to relay the enactment of the media liberalisation reforms that we announced in August 2012. For the first time in numerous decades, the publication of privately owned newspapers commenced in the country.

==== Internet ====
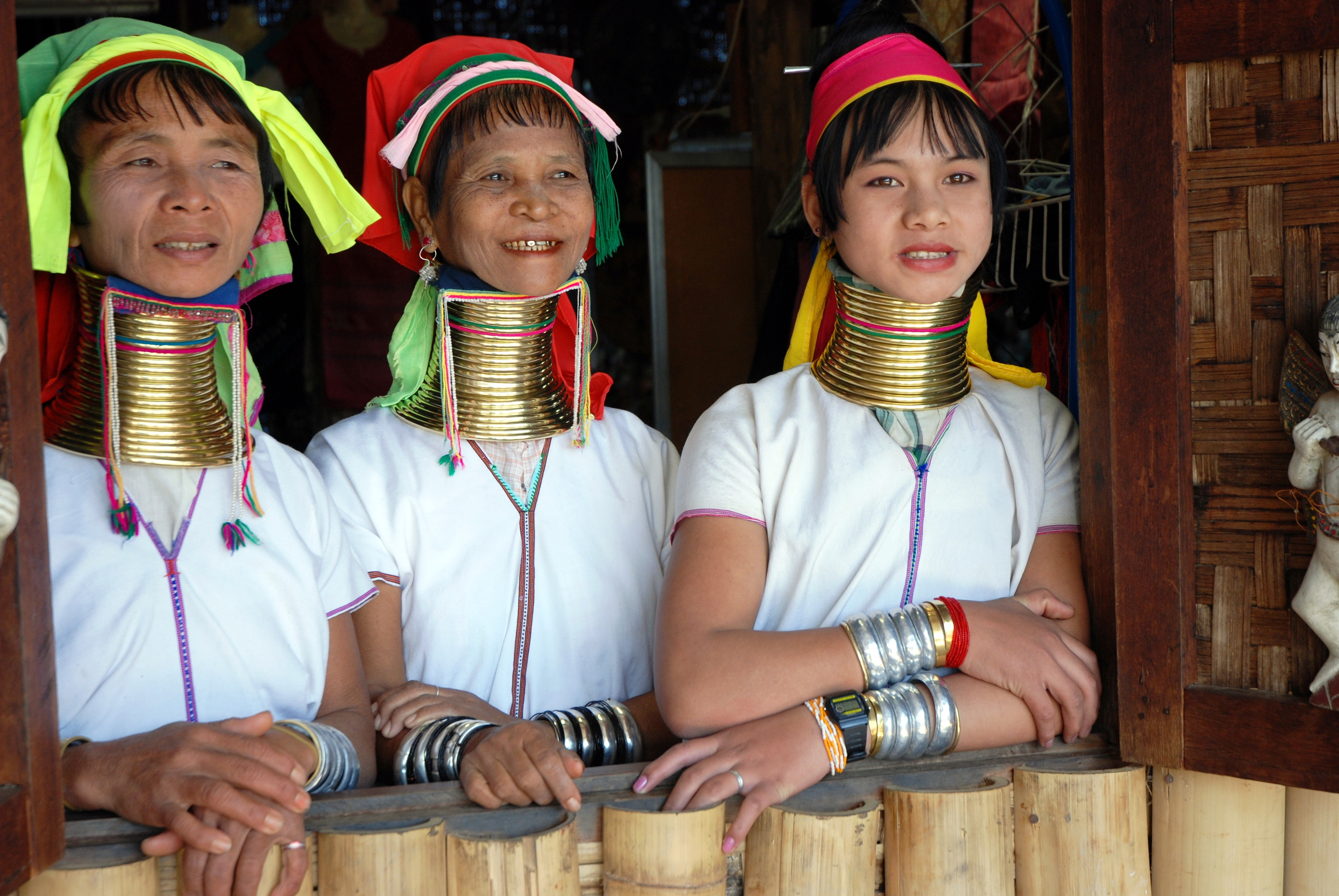
Kayan women in a village near Inle Lake, 2010

Internet use is estimated to be relatively low compared to other countries. Myanmar's internet used to be subject to censorship, and authorities viewed e-mails and posts on Internet blogs until 2012 when the government removed media censorship. During the strict censorship days, activity at internet cafes was regulated, and one blogger named Zarganar was sentenced to prison for publishing a video of destruction caused by Cyclone Nargis in 2008; Zarganar was released in October 2011.

Regarding communications infrastructure, Myanmar ranks last among Asian countries in the World Economic Forum's Networked Readiness Index (NRI) – an indicator of a country's information and communication technology development level. With 139 countries reported on, Myanmar ranked number 133 overall in the 2016 NRI ranking.

=== Film ===
Myanmar's first film was a documentary of the funeral of Tun Shein—a leading politician of the 1910s, who campaigned for Burmese independence in London. The first Burmese silent film Myitta Ne Thuya (Love and Liquor) in 1920, which proved a major success, despite its poor quality. During the 1920s and 1930s, many Burmese-owned film companies made and produced several films. The first Burmese sound film was produced in 1932 in Bombay, India, with the title Ngwe Pay Lo Ma Ya (Money Can't Buy It). After World War II, Burmese cinema continued to address political themes. Many of the films produced in the early Cold War era had a strong propaganda element.

In the era that followed the political events of 1988, the film industry has been increasingly controlled by the government. Film stars who had been involved in political activities were banned from appearing in films. The government issues strict rules on censorship and largely determines who produces films, as well as who gets Academy Awards.

Over the years, the movie industry has also shifted to producing many lower-budget direct-to-video films. Most of the movies produced nowadays are comedies. In 2008, only 12 films worthy of being considered for an Academy Award were made, although at least 800 VCDs were produced. Myanmar is the primary subject of a 2007 graphic novel titled Chroniques Birmanes by Québécois author and animator, Guy Delisle. The graphic novel was translated into English under the title Burma Chronicles in 2008. In 2009, a documentary about Burmese videojournalistss called Burma VJ was released. This film was nominated for Best Documentary Feature at the 2010 Academy Awards. The Lady had its world premiere on 12 September 2011 at the 36th Toronto International Film Festival.

== See also ==
- Outline of Myanmar
- Censorship in Myanmar
- Culture of Myanmar

== Bibliography ==
- Ten years in Burma by Julius Smith
- Cameron, Ewan. "The State of Myanmar", History Today, May 2020, vol. 70, issue 4, pp. 90–93.
- Charney, Michael W. (1999). History of Modern Burma. Cambridge University Press.
- Combs, Daniel. Until the World Shatters: Truth, Lies, and the Looting of Myanmar (2021).
- Lieberman, Victor B. (2003). Strange Parallels: Southeast Asia in Global Context, c. 800–1830, volume 1, Integration on the Mainland. Cambridge University Press. ISBN 978-0-521-80496-7.
- Maclean, Rory (2008). Under the Dragon-A Journey through Burma. Tauris Parke. ISBN 978-1-84511-622-4.
- Myint-U, Thant (2006). The River of Lost Footsteps—Histories of Burma. Farrar, Straus and Giroux. ISBN 978-0-374-16342-6.
- Kemp, Hans (2013). [Burmese Light, Impressions of the Golden Land] (illustrated with text by Tom Vater ed.). Visionary World. ISBN 978-9628563708.
- "Burma's Western Border as Reported by the Diplomatic Correspondence(1947–1975)" by Aye Chan
