= List of heads of government of Myanmar since 1948 =

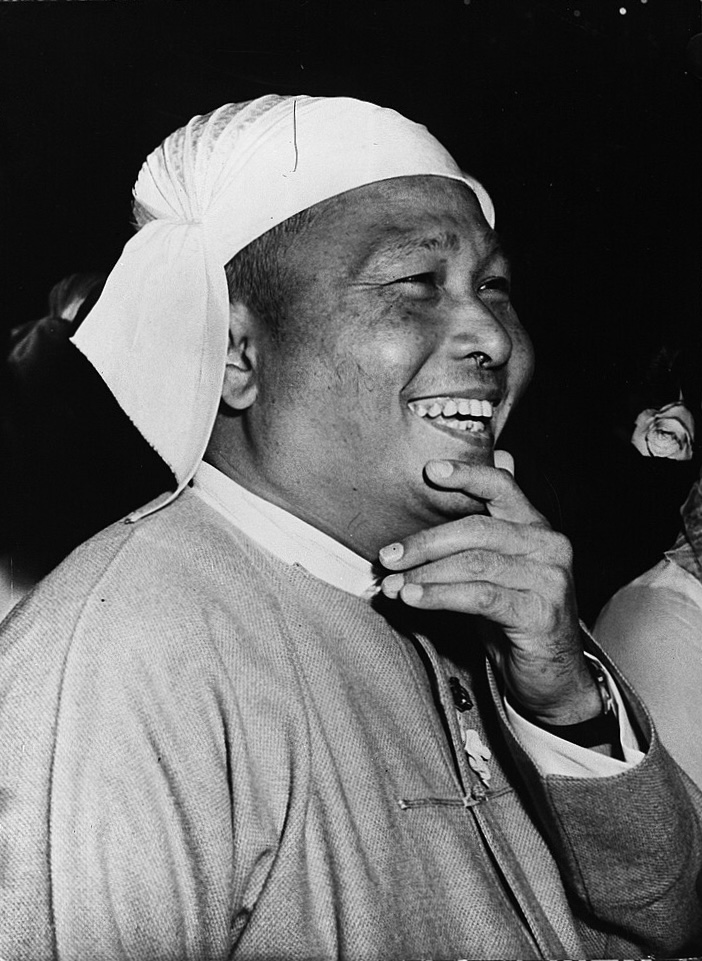
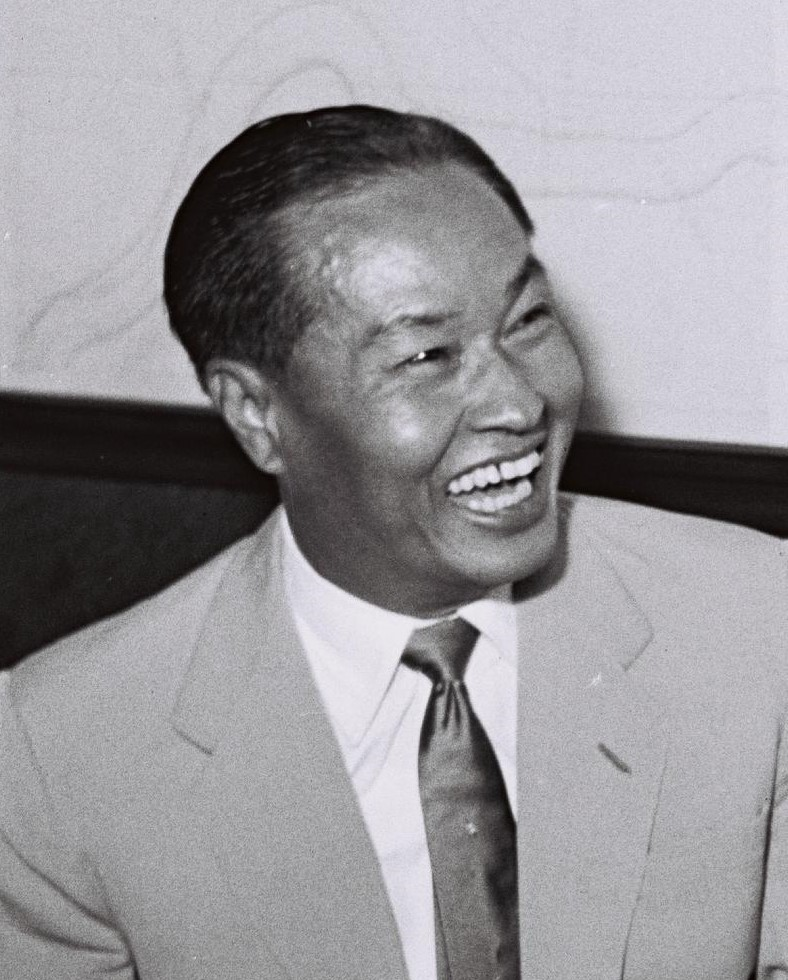
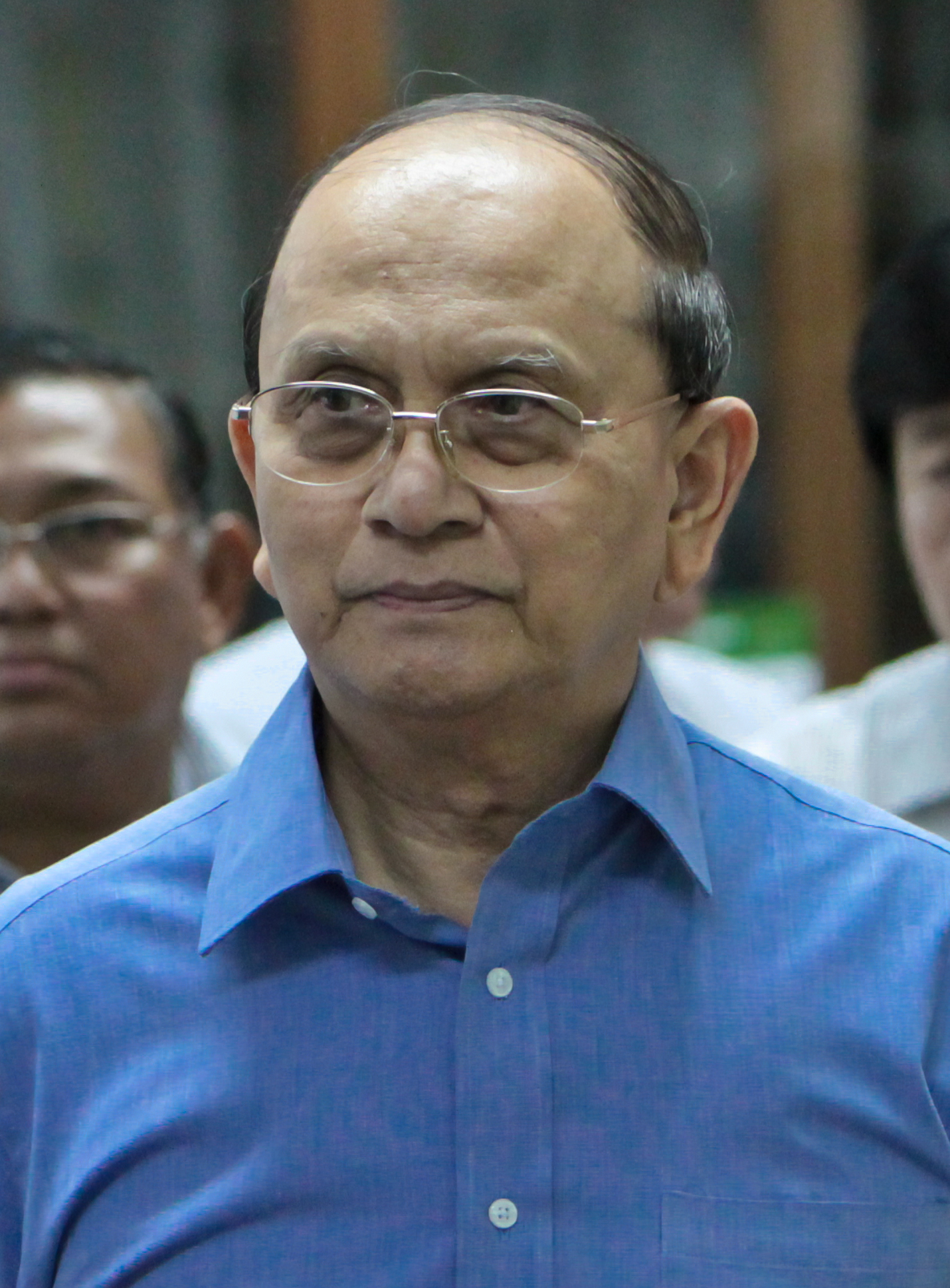
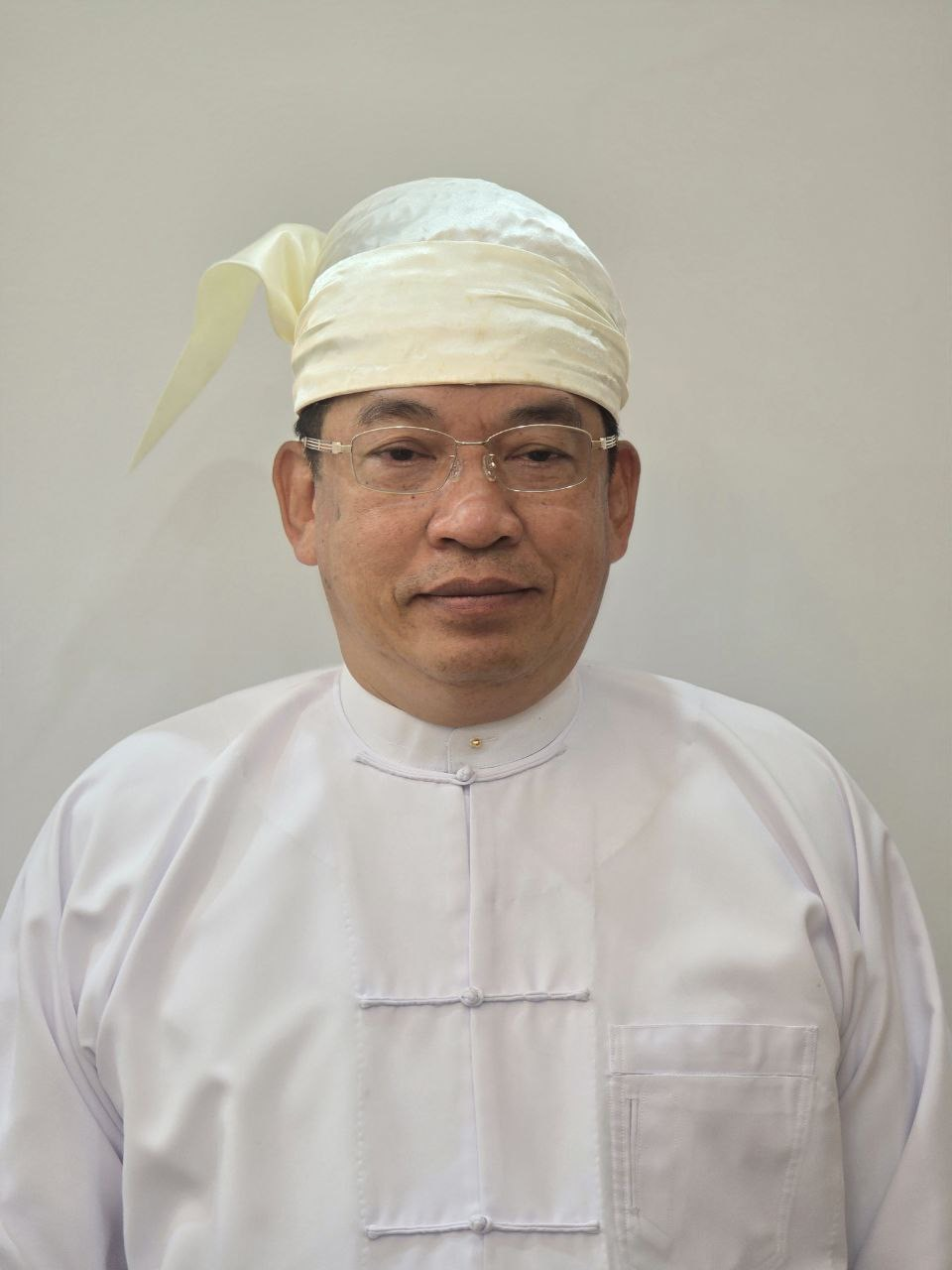
- Top left: U Nu was the first prime minister of the Union of Burma.
- Top right: Ne Win was the longest-serving head of government who turned the Union into military dictatorship.
- Bottom left: Thein Sein was considered as a reformist leader in the post-junta government.
- Botton right: Nyo Saw was the last-serving prime minister.

This article lists the heads of government of Myanmar (Burma) since the Burmese Declaration of Independence in 1948, including the prime ministers, government chairpersons and post-2011 presidents who have led the government (cabinet).

== Titles ==
Period	Position
1948–1962; 1974–2011; 2025–2026	Prime Minister (နိုင်ငံတော်ဝန်ကြီးချုပ်)
1962–1974	Chairman of the State Revolutionary Government (နိုင်ငံတော်တော်လှန်ရေးအစိုးရအဖွဲ့ဥက္ကဋ္ဌ) Chairman of the Revolutionary Government of the Union of Burma (ပြည်ထောင်စုမြန်မာနိုင်ငံတော်လှန်ရေးအစိုးရအဖွဲ့ဥက္ကဋ္ဌ)
2011–2021; 2026–present	President (နိုင်ငံတော်သမ္မတ)
2021–2025	Commander-in-Chief of Defence Services (တပ်မတော်ကာကွယ်ရေးဦးစီးချုပ်): Additional titles: Chairman of the State Administration Council (နိုင်ငံတော်စီမံအုပ်ချုပ်ရေးကောင်စီဥက္ကဋ္ဌ) (assumed on 2 February 2021); Prime Minister (နိုင်ငံတော်ဝန်ကြီးချုပ်) (assumed on 1 August 2021)

== List of officeholders ==
Political parties

Anti-Fascist People's Freedom League (AFPFL)
Union Party (Clean AFPFL)
Burma Socialist Programme Party (BSPP)
Union Solidarity and Development Party (USDP)
National League for Democracy (NLD)

Other affiliations

Military

Status

Prime minister
Chairman of government
President
Acting president

(Dates in italics indicate de facto continuation of office)

No.	Portrait	Name (Lifespan)	Term of office			Political party	Ref.
No.	Portrait	Name (Lifespan)	Start	End	Duration	Political party	Ref.
=== Union of Burma (1948–1974) ===
1		U Nu ဦးနု (1907–1995)	4 January 1948	12 June 1956 (Resigned)	8 years, 160 days	Anti-Fascist People's Freedom League	
2		Ba Swe ဘဆွေ (1915–1987)	12 June 1956	1 March 1957	262 days	Anti-Fascist People's Freedom League	
(1)		U Nu ဦးနု (1907–1995)	1 March 1957	29 October 1958 (Note: Handed over power to the military.)	1 year, 242 days	Anti-Fascist People's Freedom League	
3		Ne Win နေဝင်း (1911–2002)	29 October 1958	4 April 1960 (Note: Handed back power to the civilian government after the 1960 general election.)	1 year, 158 days	Military	
(1)		U Nu ဦးနု (1907–1995)	4 April 1960	2 March 1962 (Deposed in a coup)	1 year, 332 days	Union Party (Clean Anti-Fascist People's Freedom League)	
(3)		Ne Win နေဝင်း (1911–2002)	2 March 1962	2 March 1974	12 years	Military / Burma Socialist Programme Party	
Position vacant; power was handed to Pyithu Hluttaw (2 – 4 March 1974)
=== Socialist Republic of the Union of Burma (1974–1988) ===
4		Sein Win စိန်ဝင်း (1919–1993)	4 March 1974	29 March 1977 (Note: Removed from office due to the economic problems of the country.)	3 years, 25 days	Burma Socialist Programme Party	
5		Maung Maung Kha မောင်မောင်ခ (1920–1995)	29 March 1977	26 July 1988 (Resigned)	11 years, 119 days	Burma Socialist Programme Party	
6		Tun Tin ထွန်းတင် (1920–2020)	26 July 1988	18 September 1988 (Deposed in a coup)	54 days	Burma Socialist Programme Party	
Position vacant (18 – 21 September 1988)
=== Union of Burma / Myanmar (1988–2011) ===
7		Saw Maung စောမောင် (1928–1997)	21 September 1988	23 April 1992 (Deposed) (Note: Resigned for health reasons, de facto deposed by rival generals.)	3 years, 215 days	Military	
8		Than Shwe သန်းရွှေ (born 1933)	23 April 1992	25 August 2003	11 years, 124 days	Military / Union Solidarity and Development Association	
9		Khin Nyunt ခင်ညွန့် (born 1939)	25 August 2003	18 October 2004 (Deposed)	1 year, 54 days	Military / Union Solidarity and Development Association	
10		Soe Win စိုးဝင်း (1947–2007)	19 October 2004	12 October 2007 (Died in office)	2 years, 358 days	Military / Union Solidarity and Development Association	
11		Thein Sein သိန်းစိန် (born 1945)	12 October 2007	30 March 2011	3 years, 169 days	Military / Union Solidarity and Development Association (until 29 April 2010)	
11		Thein Sein သိန်းစိန် (born 1945)	12 October 2007	30 March 2011	3 years, 169 days	Union Solidarity and Development Party (from 8 June 2010)	
=== Republic of the Union of Myanmar (2011–present) ===
(11)		Thein Sein သိန်းစိန် (born 1945)	30 March 2011	30 March 2016	5 years	Union Solidarity and Development Party	
12		Htin Kyaw ထင်ကျော် (born 1946)	30 March 2016	21 March 2018 (Resigned)	1 year, 356 days	National League for Democracy	
—		Myint Swe မြင့်ဆွေ (1951–2025)	21 March 2018	30 March 2018	9 days	Union Solidarity and Development Party	
13		Win Myint ဝင်းမြင့် (born 1951)	30 March 2018	1 February 2021 (Deposed in a coup)	2 years, 308 days	National League for Democracy	
14		Min Aung Hlaing မင်းအောင်လှိုင် (born 1956)	1 February 2021	1 August 2021	181 days	Military	
14		Min Aung Hlaing မင်းအောင်လှိုင် (born 1956)	1 August 2021	31 July 2025	3 years, 364 days	Military	
15		Nyo Saw ညိုစော (born ?)	31 July 2025	10 April 2026	253 days	Union Solidarity and Development Party	
(14)		Min Aung Hlaing မင်းအောင်လှိုင် (born 1956)	10 April 2026	Incumbent	169 days	Union Solidarity and Development Party (Note: Independent until 20 September 2026.)	

== See also ==
- Politics of Myanmar
- History of Myanmar
- List of Burmese monarchs
- List of heads of state of Myanmar
- List of colonial governors of Burma
- List of premiers of British Burma
- President of Myanmar
  - List of heads of state of Myanmar since 1948
- Vice-President of Myanmar
- Prime Minister of Myanmar
- Deputy Prime Minister of Myanmar
- State Counsellor of Myanmar
- Chairman of the State Administration Council
