= Ne Win's First Cabinet =

Caretaker Government of the Union of Burma
- Cabinet of Burma
- 1958 — 1960
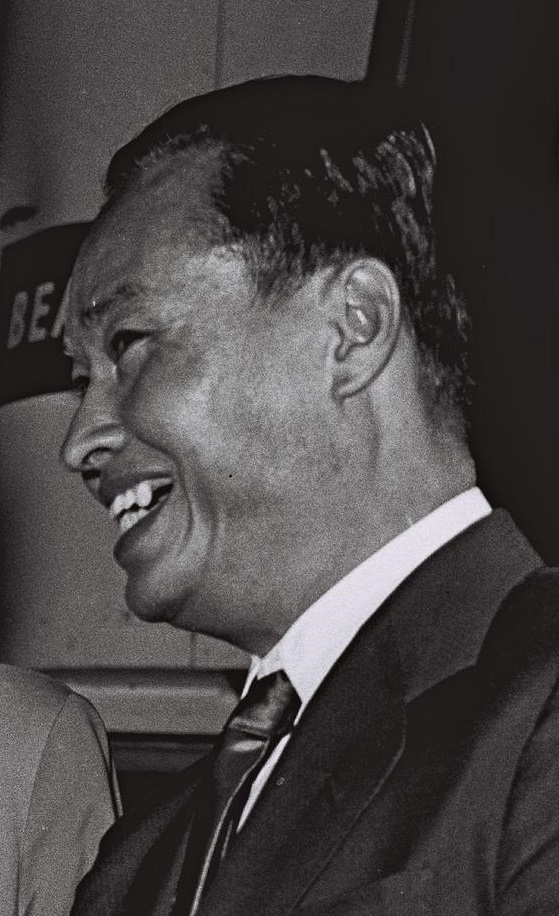
- Date formed: 28 October 1958
- Date dissolved: April 1960

People and organisations
- Head of state: Mahn Win Maung (President)
- Head of government: General Ne Win (Prime Minister)
- Deputy head of government: Thein Maung (1958 - 1959) (Deputy Prime Minister); Lun Baw (1959 - 1960) (Deputy Prime Minister )
- Member party: Tatmadaw and others

History
- Predecessor: Second U Nu Government
- Successor: Third U Nu Government

The Caretaker Government of Ne Win was formed in 1958 after Ne Win, then Chief of Staff, took over state power from U Nu, then Prime Minister. This is the first caretaker government in Burmese history. After the 1960 election, power was restored to U Nu.

== History ==
The political situation became chaotic after the ruling Anti-Fascist People's Freedom League (AFPFL) split in April 1958 as Clean AFPFL and Stable AFPFL. On the morning of September 26 1958, Colonel Aung Gyi, Brigadier General Tin Pe, Colonel Maung Maung from the Tatmadaw visited PM U Nu's house. In the evening, the executive meeting of the ruling AFPFL and the current cabinet ministers meetings were held consecutively. At that time, General Ne Win paid a short visit. The Cabinet meeting decided to nominate General Ne Win as the Prime Minister at a parliamentary session on 28 September. Incumbent Prime Minister U Nu has written to General Ne Win to form a caretaker government to handle the conditions. U Nu told Ne Win to hold general election again within 6 months (April 1959).

Then, in October 1958, a caretaker government was formed and sworn in at the Presidential Palace in Rangoon. Parliaments were not dissolved. This government is made up of a small portion of the military, mostly civilian ministers and local leaders. Newspapers reported that U Nu resigned and handed over power to General Ne Win, but some described it as a coup.

On 29 April 1959, during the caretaker government, 34 Shan Saopha relinquished power. General Election was held in February 1960 and U Nu won the election. However, two years later, in March 1962, the military seized power.

== Cabinet ==
No	Name	Ministry
1	General Ne Win	Prime Minister; Ministry of Defence
2	Thein Maung (1958-1959)	Deputy Prime Minister; Ministry of Foreign Affairs, Ministry of Religious Affairs, Ministry of Health
2	Lun Baw (1959-1960)	Deputy Prime Minister
3	Khin Maung Phyu	Ministry of Home Affairs, Ministry of Information, Ministry of Immigration and National Registration
4	Chan Tun Aung	Ministry of Justice
5	Kyaw Nyein	Ministry of Finance and Revenue
6	Ba Kyar	Ministry of Cooperatives and Commodity Distribution
7	San Nyunt	Ministry of Transport, Ministry of Construction
8	U Kar	Ministry of Education, Ministry of Forestry
9	Chit Thaung	Ministry of Industry, Ministry of Labour
10	Sao Wanna	Minister for Kayah State
11	Sao Hong Pe	Minister for Shan State
12	Htan Hlyan; Ral Hmung (Yar Hmone)	Minister for Chin
13	Saw Hla Tum	Minister for Kayin
14	Duwa Zaw Lun	Minister for Kachin State
