= Military rule in Myanmar =

Period of Burmese history from 1962–2011 and 2021–present

Stratocracy in Myanmar (also known as Burma) lasted from 1962 to 2011 and resumed in 2021. Myanmar gained its independence from the British Empire in 1948 under the Burma Independence Army, as a democratic nation. The first military rule began in 1958 and direct military rule started when Ne Win captured power through a coup d'état in 1962. Burma became a military dictatorship (Socialist Republic of the Union of Burma) under the Burma Socialist Programme Party that lasted for 26 years, under the claim to save the country from disintegration. During this period there was some democratic landscape in the form of giving rights to the citizen to elect and to stand for election.

Since April 1948, the sovereign state has been involved in constant ethnic conflict that has resulted in the world's longest-running ongoing civil wars. Under its successive military regimes the state has been condemned for its human rights violations. During the civil war, the United Nations and several other organizations have reported human rights violations in the country.

== Introduction ==
Myanmar, the largest country in Mainland Southeast Asia, is located at the meeting point of South and Southeast Asia. It is bordered by five nations: China, Laos, Thailand, India and Bangladesh. Myanmar gained its independence on 4 January 1948 from the United Kingdom under the leadership of General Aung San of the National Army.

In July 1947, Aung San was assassinated by rivals under the leadership of U Saw, but achieved independence in January 1948 under U Nu. Since its struggle for independence, the armed forces known as the ‘Tatmadaw’ played an important role in gaining independence and it was under the Burmese Independence Army that Myanmar got its independence. The Army in Myanmar had gained respect in independent Myanmar at the initial stage and perceived as protector of the country. The military claims itself as the founder of the Union of Burma, and the main force that held the country together during the civil war and also claimed that it has prevented the country from disintegrating.

After independence was achieved, a constitutional government was formed and U Nu was nominated as the first Prime Minister of Independent Myanmar. However, the newly formed civilian government under U Nu failed to maintain the unity of the country, facing domestic problems, ethnic issues, insurgency, corruption, mismanagement, and the ethnic insurgencies which took up arms against each other. In 1958, a split within the AFPFL threatened to provoke a coup by field officers. In order to settle the situation, U Nu invited the military to form a caretaker government.

In 1958–60, the caretaker government under General Ne Win was formed. The caretaker government initially appeared to be interested in building a competent state. It reduced corruption, improved bureaucratic efficiency, and managed to deal with the pocket armies. The military junta announced to hold an election in 1960.

After the election in 1960, U Nu's party formed a civilian government. But the civilian government under U Nu could not solve and improve the situation, and rather threatened the national integration of the country, leading to the coup on March 2, 1962, under General Ne Win. The main reasons for the coup were a mix of political infighting, policy gridlock, multiple insurgencies on a massive scale, and a declining economy. After the coup, the military government arrested members of the government, suspended the constitution, and appointed a Union Revolutionary Council (RC) to govern Myanmar by decree.

== 1962 to 2011 ==
The coup on 2 March 1962 led to the end of democratic form of government and the beginning of direct military rule in Myanmar up to 1974. During the period of military rule under General Ne Win, the country was shaped into one-party socialist state under the army led party called as Burma Socialist Programme Party (BSPP) until 1988. And the year from 1962 to 1988, can be marked as the era of Ne Win. The period from 1962 to 1988 can be divided into two phases. The first phase is the period of direct military rule from 1962 to 1974 and Constitutional Dictatorship phase from 1974 to 1988.

In 2011, the military junta was officially dissolved, following a 2010 general election, and a nominally civilian government was installed.

== Since 2021 ==
In February 2021, the Tatmadaw detained State Counsellor Aung San Suu Kyi, President Win Myint, and other government leaders. They then proceeded to take control of the government, and instituted a one-year state of emergency, with Burma's Commander-in-chief of the armed forces, Min Aung Hlaing, as the leader of the country, serving as the Chairman of the State Administration Council, who has taken on a new title as Prime Minister of a newly formed caretaker government.

After the coup in 2021, the military junta, headed by Senior General Min Aung Hlaing, has been confronted with a growing national civil war. The military regime has continued to engage in external diplomatic relations, including high-level visits from regional powers like China, in spite of strong opposition from the Unity Government (NUG) and affiliated ethnic armed groups. In late 2025 and early 2026, the regime conducted a sham election.
