= Burmese Way to Socialism =

State ideology of Burma from 1962 to 1988

Flag of the Burma Socialist Programme Party

The Burmese Way to Socialism (Burmese: မြန်မာ့နည်းမြန်မာ့ဟန် ဆိုရှယ်လစ်စနစ်), also known as the Burmese Road to Socialism, was the state ideology of the Socialist Republic of the Union of Burma, the socialist state governed by the Burma Socialist Programme Party (BSPP) from 1962 to 1988.

The Burmese Way to Socialism was prepared by a group of socialist-leaned military officials and ex-communists for the Revolutionary Council of the Union of Burma (RC), the military junta established by Ne Win and his allies in the Tatmadaw (Burmese military) after they overthrew the democratically elected government of Prime Minister U Nu in a coup d'état on 2 March 1962. It ceased to be Burma's state ideology in 1988, when the pro-democracy 8888 Uprising pressured BSPP officials to resign and adopt a multi-party system. However, the Tatmadaw instigated a coup d'état shortly afterwards and established a new military junta, the State Law and Order Restoration Council.

The Burmese Way to Socialism led Burma to international isolation, and has been described as "disastrous". For example, the black market and income disparity became major issues. Burma's real per capita GDP (constant 2000 US$) increased from $159.18 in 1962 to $219.20 in 1987, or about 1.3% per year – one of the weakest growth rates in East Asia over this period. Despite this, significant gains were made in healthcare and education. The program also may have served to increase domestic stability and keep Burma from being as entangled in the Cold War struggles that affected other Southeast Asian nations.

== Background ==
Burma under Prime Minister U Nu and the AFPFL-led coalition government in the Union Parliament had implemented left-wing economic and welfare policies, although economic growth remained slow throughout the 1950s. By 1958, Burma was largely beginning to recover economically, but was beginning to fall apart politically due to a split in the ruling AFPFL into two factions: the Clean AFPFL (သန့်ရှင်းဖဆပလ) led by U Nu and Thakin Tin, and the Stable AFPFL (တည်မြဲဖဆပလ) led by Ba Swe and Kyaw Nyein. This situation persisted despite the unexpected success of U Nu's "Arms for Democracy" offer taken up by U Seinda in the Arakan, the Pa-O, some Mon and Shan groups, but more significantly by the PVO surrendering their arms. The Union Parliament became very unstable, with U Nu barely surviving a no-confidence vote only with the support of the opposition National United Front (NUF), believed to have crypto-communists amongst them. Hardliners in the Burmese Army viewed this as a threat of the Communist Party of Burma (CPB) coming to an agreement with U Nu through the NUF, and resulted in U Nu inviting General Ne Win, the Army Chief of Staff, to serve as interim prime minister to restore order in Burma. Over 400 "communist sympathizers" were arrested, of which 153 were deported to a penal colony on Great Coco Island in the Andaman Sea. Among them was the NUF leader Aung Than, elder brother of Aung San. Newspapers like Botahtaung, Kyemon and Rangoon Daily were also closed down.

On 28 October 1958, Ne Win staged an internal coup d'état under the auspices of U Nu and successfully restored Burma's political stability, a period known as the "Ne Win caretaker government", until the February 1960 general election which returned U Nu's Clean AFPFL, renamed as the Union Party, with a large majority. Ne Win officially handed back power to the victorious U Nu on 4 April 1960. However, the situation in Burma did not remain stable for long due to petitions from the Shan federalist movement started by Sao Shwe Thaik, the first President of Burma from 1948 to 1952 and the Saopha of Nyaung Shwe. The Shan federalists were aspiring to create a "loose" federation in Burma, and were seen as a separatist movement for insisting on the Burmese government honouring the right to secession in 10 years provided for by the 1947 Constitution. Ne Win had already succeeded in stripping the Shan Saopha of their feudal powers in exchange for comfortable pensions for life in 1959, but the unresolved issues of federalism and social order continued.

=== 1962 Burmese coup d'état ===
By 1962, the Burmese public perceived the elected civilian government as corrupt, inept at ruling the country, and unable to restore law and order, while the Burmese military were popular from stability created by Ne Win's caretaker government. On 2 March 1962, less than two years after returning to civilian rule, Ne Win launched a second military-backed coup d'état, this time without U Nu's blessing. Ne Win established Burma as a one-party socialist state under a military government with the Revolutionary Council of the Union of Burma replacing the Union Parliament as the supreme governing body. Ne Win became a dictator as both the Chairman of the Revolutionary Council (the head of state) and the Chairman of the Revolutionary Government (the head of government) in Burma. The junta needed an official ideology to back its rule, so U Saw Oo, Colonel Saw Myint and U Chit Hlaing were summoned to prepare The System of Correlation of Man and his Environment" under Ne Win's guidelines and the text would become the ideological foundation of the BSPP's Burmese Way to Socialism. In April, the Revolutionary Council government adopted the "Burmese Way to Socialism" as its official political and economic ideology for governing Burma. In July, the Burma Socialist Programme Party (BSPP) was founded as part of the Burmese Way to Socialism to be Burma's sole legal political party. The BSPP became the official ruling party with Ne Win as its Chairman.

== Ideological features ==
The "Burmese Way to Socialism" has been described by some scholars as anti-Western, isolationist and socialist in nature, characterised also by an extensive dependence on the military, emphasis on the rural populace, and Burmese (or more specifically, Burman) nationalism. Despite the Revolutionary Council leaders' phraseology being socialist, their actions were those of ardent nationalists seeking to maximize the power of their state. In January 1963, the "Burmese Way to Socialism" was further elaborated in a political public policy called "The System of Correlation of Man and His Environment" (လူနှင့် ပတ်ဝန်းကျင်တို့၏ အညမည သဘောတရား), published as the philosophical and political basis for the Burmese approach to society and what Ne Win deemed as socialism, influenced by Buddhist, humanist and Marxist views.

The fundamentals of the "Burmese Way to Socialism", as outlined in 1963, were as follows:

1. In setting forth their programmes as well as in their execution the Revolutionary Council will study and appraise the concrete realities and also the natural conditions peculiar to Burma objectively. On the basis of the actual findings derived from such study and appraisal it will develop its own ways and means to progress.
2. In its activities the Revolutionary Council will strive for self-improvement by way of self-criticism. Having learnt from contemporary history the evils of deviation towards right or left the Council will with vigilance avoid any such deviation.
3. In whatever situations and difficulties the Revolutionary Council may find itself it will strive for advancement in accordance with the times, conditions, environment and the ever-changing circumstances, keeping at heart the basic interests of the nation.
4. The Revolutionary Council will diligently seek all ways and means whereby it can formulate and carry out such programmes as are of real and practical value for the well-being of the nation. In doing so it will critically observe, study and avail itself of the opportunities provided by progressive ideas, theories and experiences at home, or abroad without discrimination between one country of origin and another.

The subsequent discussion of the nature of ownership, planning and development strategy in Burma between 1962 and the mid-1970s indicates that while Burma formally established the structures of a socialist economy, it did not effectively implement those structures. Furthermore, since the mid-1970s due to economic failure, Burma had to accept policies that imply more private activity, including foreign investment.

According to a 1981 scholarly analysis, "there is little evidence that Burma either is now, or is in the process of becoming a socialist society". The study also stated that "the leadership, although demonstrating a certain social concern, clearly lacks the ability and the will necessary to build a socialist society".

Especially after the 1990s, ethnic activists referred to General Ne Win's policies of the 1960s as "Burmanization." This term referred to the policies of the Burmese Road to Socialism, with its emphasis on Burmese culture, military control, and Burmese Buddhism. Such critique claimed that Burmese Road to Socialism policies were an attempt to "Burmanize" the substantial ethnic populations of Myanmar via a nationalized school system, popular culture and the military. In the context of Burmanization, military officers supervised the spread of Burmeses language, culture, and Buddhism. Resistance to such policies resulted in ethnic insurgencies, and violent responses of the Burmese military known as "Four Cuts" policies, denial of citizenship to groups like the Rohingya.

== Impact ==
The "Burmese Way to Socialism," while making significant strides in education and healthcare, also negatively affected the economy and the living standards of the Burmese people. Foreign aid organisations, like the American-based Ford Foundation and Asia Foundation, as well as the World Bank, were no longer allowed to operate in the country. Only permitted was aid from a government-to-government basis. In addition, the teaching of the English language was reformed and moved to secondary schools, whereas previously it had started as early as kindergarten. The government also implemented extensive visa restrictions for Burmese citizens, especially when their destinations were Western countries. Instead, the government sponsored the travel of students, scientists and technicians to the Soviet Union and Eastern Europe, in order to receive training and to "counter years of Western influence" in the country. Similarly, visas for foreigners were limited to just 24 hours.

Furthermore, freedom of expression and the freedom of the press was extensively restricted. Foreign language publications were prohibited, as were newspapers that printed "false propagandist news." The Press Scrutiny Board (now the Press Scrutiny and Registration Division), which censors all publications to this day, including newspapers, journals, advertisements and cartoons, was established by the RC through the Printers' and Publishers' Registration Act in August 1962. The RC set up the News Agency of Burma (BNA) to serve as a news distribution service in the country, thus effectively replacing the work of foreign news agencies. In September 1963, The Vanguard and The Guardian, two Burmese newspapers, were nationalized. In December 1965, publication of privately owned newspapers was banned by the government.

The impact on the Burmese economy was extensive. The Enterprise Nationalization Law, passed by the Revolutionary Council in 1963, nationalized all major industries, including import-export trade, rice, banking, mining, teak and rubber on 1 June 1963. In total, around 15,000 private firms were nationalized. Furthermore, industrialists were prohibited from establishing new factories with private capital. This was particularly detrimental to the Anglo-Burmese, Burmese Indians and the British, who were disproportionately represented in these industries.

The oil industry, which was previously controlled by American and British companies, such as the General Exploration Company and East Asiatic Burma Oil, were forced to end operations. In its place was the government-owned Burma Oil Company, which monopolized oil extraction and production. In August 1963, the nationalization of basic industries, including department stores, warehouses and wholesale shops, followed. Price control boards were also introduced.

The Enterprise Nationalization Law directly affected foreigners in Burma, particularly Burmese Indians and the Burmese Chinese, both of whom had been influential in the economic sector as entrepreneurs and industrialists. By mid-1963, 2,500 foreigners a week were leaving Burma. By September 1964, approximately 100,000 Indian nationals had left the country.

The black market became a major feature of Burmese society, representing about 80% of the national economy during the Burmese Way period. Moreover, income disparity became a major socioeconomic issue. Throughout the 1960s, Burma's foreign exchange reserves declined from $214 million in 1964 to $50 million in 1971, while inflation skyrocketed.

Significant gains were made in some of the social sectors. Adult literacy rate grew from 60% to 80% between the late 1960s and 1980s, and the number enrolled in primary schools as a percentage of the age group increased from 44% to 54% during the same period. In the health sector, life expectancy rose from 44% to 54%, infant mortality rate declined from 129 to 50, and the number of persons per physician, from 15,560 to 3,900 during the same period.

In the 1st BSPP Congress in 1971, several minor economic reforms were made, in light of the failures of the economic policy pursued throughout the 1960s. The Burmese government asked to rejoin the World Bank, joined the Asian Development Bank, and sought more foreign aid and assistance. The Twenty-Year Plan, an economic plan divided into five increments of implementation, was introduced, in order to develop the country's natural resources, including agriculture, forestry, oil and natural gas, through state development. These reforms brought living standards back to pre-World War II levels and stimulated economic growth. However, by 1988, foreign debt had ballooned to $4.9 billion, about three-fourths of the national GDP, and Ne Win's later attempt to make the Kyat based in denominations divisible by 9, a number he considered to be auspicious, led to the wiping of millions of savings of the Burmese people, resulting in the 8888 Uprising.

== See also ==
- Politics of Myanmar
- Human rights in Myanmar
- Economy of Myanmar
