= Stable AFPFL =

Stable Anti-Fascist People's Freedom League တည်မြဲ ဖဆပလ
- Chairperson: Kyaw Nyein; Ba Swe
- Founded: June 1958
- Dissolved: 1962
- Split from: AFPFL
- Ideology: Anti-fascism; Burmese nationalism Democratic socialism
- Political position: Left-wing
- Colors: Red

Party flag

The Stable Anti-Fascist People's Freedom League (Stable AFPFL) was a political party in Burma.

== History ==
The party was formed in June 1958 when the Anti-Fascist People's Freedom League (AFPFL) split in two following internal disputes that had intensified since its January congress; One group was led by Prime Minister U Nu, which he named the "Clean AFPFL"; the other was led by Kyaw Nyein and Ba Swe and became known as the Stable AFPFL. Although the Stable faction was supported by the larger group of AFPFL members in the Chamber of Deputies, U Nu was able to continue as Prime Minister due to support from the National United Front and some of the independent MPs. However, the dispute between the two factions continued to worsen and in September 1958 the Army brokered a compromise, taking power with a government headed by Ne Win until elections were held eighteen months later.

In the 1960 elections the party put forward 202 candidates and received 31% of the vote, winning 41 of the 250 seats in the Chamber of Deputies and 29 of the 125 seats in the Chamber of Nationalities; the Clean AFPFL won 158 Chamber of Deputies seats and 53 Chamber of Nationalities seats, allowing U Nu to return as Prime Minister.

In 1962 U Nu's government was overthrown by a military coup led by Ne Win. The leadership of the Stable AFPFL refused to co-operate with the military government, and the party was dissolved.
