= Pyidawtha Plan =

The Pyidawtha Plan (Burmese: ပြည်တော်သာစီမံကိန်း) was an eight-year national economic development plan established by the Burmese government in 1952, to develop an industrialized welfare state in post-colonial Burma. The Plan, commissioned under Prime Minister U Nu's leadership, was one of the first economic development plans to be adopted by a developing country in the post-war decolonization period, and served as a model for other countries. The Plan was initially estimated to cost US$1,575,000,000, with two-thirds for industrial enterprises, and the remainder to fund social services. The Plan was Burma's second national development plan, the first being the 1947 Sorrento Villa Plan. The Plan was halted following the 1962 Burmese coup d'état by Ne Win.

The Pyidawtha Plan made headway in infrastructure, agriculture and industry, despite failing to meet its ambitious targets because of the collapse in rice prices following the Korean War boom. Lack of state funding had stalled much of the project by 1956, as rice revenues comprised the main funding source for this plan.

In August 1951, the Burmese government entered into a contract with Knappen Tippetts Abbett, an American engineering firm, along with a mining engineering firm and economic consulting firm, to develop a comprehensive, integrated program for resource development in Burma. The project was financed by the Technical Cooperation Administration, a precursor to the United States Agency for International Development. The 800-page report, entitled “Comprehensive Report: Economic and Engineering Development of Burma, was completed in August 1953. It focused heavily on infrastructure rehabilitation, as Burma's infrastructure had suffered extensively during World War II.

The government introduced the Plan to the country during the Pyidawtha Conference, which was held from 7 to 17 August 1952. The Pyidawtha Plan consisted of 10 schemes covering 10 overarching areas:

1. Devolution of power to regional governments
2. Health
3. Education
4. Economy
5. Nationalization of arable lands
6. Transportation
7. Welfare
8. Democratic local councils
9. Development of frontier and undeveloped areas
10. Rebuilding
