= Parliamentary Democracy Party =

Parliamentary Democracy Party ပါလီမန်ဒီမိုကရေစီပါတီ
- President: U Nu
- Secretary-General: Law Yone
- Founder: U Nu; Bo Let Ya; Law Yone; U Thwin; Tommy Clift; Zali Ma; Bohmu Aung
- Founded: 29 August 1969
- Dissolved: 1973
- Preceded by: Unity Party
- Succeeded by: People's Patriotic Party
- Paramilitary wing: Patriotic Liberation Army
- Ideology: Burmese nationalism Democratic socialism Anti-Ne Win
- Political position: Left-wing

The Parliamentary Democracy Party (PDP) was a Burmese political party established in August 1969 by the exiled prime minister U Nu.

U Nu, exiled to Thailand, worked with the former newspaper editor Edward Law Yone and four members of the Thirty Comrades to set up the PDP. Its armed wing, the Patriotic Liberation Army, unsuccessfully attempted insurgency along the border between Thailand and Burma. In 1970, with covert CIA backing, the party tried to establish a united front, known as the National United Front, together with the Karen National Union, the Chin Democracy Party and the New Mon State Army. The end of the Vietnam War also brought an influx of modern weaponry for the PLA such as M79 grenade launchers, M16 rifles, and AK47 rifles. Former KNU leader and current State Administration Council junta member, Mahn Nyein Maung, claimed that the KNLA still largely used WW2-era weapons such as Bren guns at this time. However, the NUF faced financial difficulties and political disagreement between its different ethnic constituencies. After U Nu resigned the PDP's presidency and moved to India in 1973, the movement collapsed.
