= Kyaw Tun =

Thakin Kyaw Tun, or Thakin Kyaw Dun (Burmese: ကျော်ထွန်း 1915–1980) was a Burmese politician.

== Early life and education ==
Thakin Kyaw Tun was born in AlLaBote village, Htantabin Township, Insein District by U Bo Sa and Daw Ohn in 1915. He studied at Buddhist English-Burmese School Thar Yawaddy, Tharyawaddy ABM and Insein High Schools respectively.

== Career ==
He joined Dobama Asiayone and became a Thakin in 1935. He began to take part in peasant movements. In 1938, he became a member of the working committee of the All Burma Peasants Organization, a branch of Dobama Asiayone. At the same time, he was the secretary of All Burma Peasant Organization (Insein District).

He participated actively in the year 1300 Revolution and also campaigned against the oppressive laws on peasants; for this, he was arrested and imprisoned by the colonial British Government.

In the 1942 Resistance Against the Japanese, he worked underground as a member of the People's Revolution Party (PRP) (later become socialist party). On the formation of the Burma Independence Army (BIA), as a revolutionary leader of the Insein District, he took part in the administration of Insein District. Later, in the movement against British Occupation and the struggle for the independence, he worked closely with Thakin Tin, U Kyaw Nyein, Thakin Chit, U Ba Swe and Thakin Tin Tun.

In May 1942, he attended BIA officer training school. On the transition of BIA to BDA (Burma Defence Army) he left the army.

As an organizer in Insein District for Dobama Poor Man organization, he undertook secret organization for the resistance against the Japanese occupation, by communicating with Thakin Than Tun and Thakin Chit.

In 1945, he was the political leader for Insein District and worked with Division 1, Min Hla Sithu Force. After the World War II, he took part in the formation of the Socialist Party. Later he became deputy secretary for the Socialist Party. In 1950, he became the General Secretary of the All Burma Peasants Organization.

He was elected as a member of parliament in the 1947 election from Insein North. In 1950, he became the parliament secretary for the Forestry and Agriculture Ministry. In 1952, he became Minister for the same department.

From 1956 to 1960, he worked as the president of the Economy and Trade Organization. In 1956, when U Nu resigned from the Prime Minister Post to take up the president post of AFPFL Thakin Kyaw Tun also resigned from the minister post to work along with U Nu as the general secretary of AFPFL.

Because of the differences among the leaders of AFPFL, the party split in 1958. Thakin Kyaw Tun became the general secretary of AFPFL (clean) faction which was led by U Nu and Thakin Tin.

Thakin Kyaw Tun's post as the minister for Forestry and Agriculture and Cooperatives and Good Distribution in the new AFPFL (clean) government lasted only for 3 months and 17 days, cut short by the first Coup de ta by the army in 1958.

He did not participate in the 1960 election, instead playing the role of general secretary of “Union Party”, formerly the AFPFL (clean) party. During the split between “U-BO” and “Thakin” fractions, Thakin Kyaw Tun led the Thakin Fraction.

In 1964, he resigned from the Union Party and joined the Burmese Way to Socialist Party and in 1965 we worked as the president of Trade Corporation No. 6. He worked as the Ambassador of Burma to the Soviet Union, Poland and Romania based in Moscow from 1969 to 1975, after which he retired.

== Death ==
On 6 February 1980, he died in Yangon, leaving his wife, Daw Sein Thaung and 9 children.
