= National United Front =

The National United Front (Burmese: အမျိုးသား ညီညွတ်ရေး တပ်ပေါင်းစု) was a political alliance in Myanmar.

== History ==
The alliance was formed in 1955 as a successor to the People's Democratic Front, ahead of the April 1956 general elections. The NUF consisted of leftist parties such as the Burma Workers Party, the People's Unity Party led by Thein Pe Myint and the People's Peace Front, as well as right-wing parties including the Justice Party led by Aye Maung, the New Mon National Party. In the elections the alliance received 30.4% of the vote, winning 47 seats. Until 1958 it served as the major opposition bloc in the Chamber of Deputies, but when the ruling Anti-Fascist People's Freedom League split into two factions (the Clean AFPFL and the Stable AFPFL) the NUF supported the Clean AFPFL faction led by U Nu in forming a government, although Nu only allowed conservative NUF members to become cabinet ministers.

By the 1960 elections most of the conservative factions of the alliance had left to affiliate with the Clean AFPFL. Although the alliance put forward 135 candidates, it was reduced to just three seats, possibly due to its opposition to the establishment of Buddhism as the state religion. Following the 1962 coup, the NUF leadership joined the Burma Socialist Programme Party.
