= Maung Maung (1920–2009) =

Burmese army brigadier, diplomat and author

U Maung Maung
- ဦးမောင်မောင်

Myanmar Ambassador to Israel
- In office 1961–1965
- Succeeded by: Wunna Maung Lwin

Myanmar Ambassador to Serbia
- In office 1965–1968
- Succeeded by: Chit Myaing

Myanmar Ambassador to Indonesia
- In office 1968–1972
- Succeeded by: 1984–85: Kyaw Khin; 1985–88 Col. Than Hla

Myanmar Ambassador to Australia
- In office 1972–1975
- Preceded by: Aung Shwe
- Succeeded by: Pe Aung

Personal details
- Born: 18 April 1920 Toungoo
- Died: 8 July 2009 (aged 89)
- Resting place: Was Cremated
- Citizenship: Myanmar (Burmese)
- Education: University of Rangoon; Australian National University; 1953 B.A., University of Rangoon; 1978 M.A.ANU, Canberra

Maung Maung (Burmese: မောင်မောင် [màʊɰ̃ màʊɰ̃]; 18 April 1920 - 8 July 2009) was a Burmese army brigadier, diplomat and author. He was one of the founders of the Anti-Fascist People's' Freedom League (AFPFL) and The Burma Socialist Party.

== Education ==
- 1937 March, Matriculated or finished high school, Rangoon (now Yangon) University's Teachers Training School. Rangoon, Burma
- 1937 June, Entered University Of Rangoon. Rangoon, Burma
- 1940 June, Medical College of Rangoon University, interrupted by WW II, against Japan
- 1941-1942, Secretary of the Rangoon University Students' Union.
- 1953, Bachelor Of Arts from University of Rangoon, Rangoon, Burma
- 1978, Master Of Arts (Asian Civilization), The Australian National University, Canberra, Australia.

== Career ==
=== Political ===
- 1941–1942, General Secretary of the Rangoon University's Students' Union. Became one of the leaders of the National Independence Movement
- 1945, With the rank army major was an area commander with Burma National Army (BNA). It was allied with the British forces in April 1945

=== Military ===
- 1945 December, Joined the Burma Army (British) with the initial rank of captain, BC 3507 (British Commission)
- 1946 August, Promoted to major and became an infantry commander
- 1947 November, Promoted to lieutenant-colonel and became commander of the 4th Battalion, The Burma Rifles Regiment.
- 1948, At the independence of Burma he was appointed commandant of The Burma Army Officers Training School, was also concurrently station commander of Maymyo (now Pyin Oo Lwin) Shan State. Temporary commander, North Burma Sub-District, Grade-1 at the War Office. (In 1952 became the Defense Ministry)
- 1953, Director of Military Training Burma army
- 1954, Director Of Training of the Defense Forces of Burma at Ministry Of Defense. The same year he founded The Defense Forces Academy or the Military Academy for all three defense forces and also founded other army military schools.
- 1958–1960, Became member of senate of Rangoon University, professor of military studies and later concurrently head Of Department of International Relations at the university. Vice-chairman of the Internal Security of Burma, which responsibilities were for the internal security of the entire country, had command over security forces, including the police, para-military and para-forces. He also founded the National Defense College; which was for all Defense Forces and the Civil Forces in 1959. He concurrently held the post of commandant of the college with the acting rank of brigadier.
- 1961 February, Retired from the military service and was appointed as Ambassador Extraordinary of Burma. and joined the Foreign Service.

=== Foreign Service ===
- 1961-1965, Ambassador of Burma in Tel Aviv, Israel
- 1965-1968, Ambassador in Belgrade, the former Yugoslavia, concurrently accredited in Vienna, Sofia and Athens.
- 1968-1972, Ambassador in Jakarta, concurrently accredited in Manila .
- 1972-1975, Ambassador in Canberra, concurrently accredited in Wellington.
- 1975 August, U Maung Maung retired.

=== Other responsibilities carried out while in service of the Foreign Service ===
- 1962–1963, Leader of the Burma Delegation for the 17th and 19th Sessions of the "Second Committee (Economic) Summit" at the UN General Assembly
- 1964, Head Of Burma Delegation for the "First UN Conference on Trade & Development" in Geneva
- 1965–1968, Head of Burma Delegation for the "Eighteen Nation Disarmament Conference " in Geneva.
- 1967, Head of Burma Delegation for the Session of the Special Committee on "International Law and Friendly Relations in Geneva
- 1971, Head Of Burma Delegation to the "Conference of Ministers of Education & Development (MINIDAS III) of UNESCO in Singapore
- 1973, Participated in the "Colombo Plan Ministerial Conference as Alternative Leader of The Burma Delegation led by the Trade minister in Wellington, New Zealand

== Publications ==
- From Sangha to Laity: Nationalist Movements of Burma, 1920–1940, Manohar for the South Asian History Section, Australian National University, 1980 - 311 p.
- Burmese Nationalist Movements 1940–1948, Kiscadale Publications 1980. 395 p.
- Some Aspects Of The Caretaker Government; BURMA 1958–60, An Experiment In Democratic Process 2018, Translated by Sithu Kyaw, Published by Yangon Lun Mya (Roads of Yangon). (Note: this book was published without the full support of the family.)
