= Anti-Fascist People's Freedom League =

Burmese political party

Anti-Fascist People's Freedom League ဖက်ဆစ်ဆန့်ကျင်ရေး ပြည်သူ့လွတ်လပ်ရေး အဖွဲ့ချုပ်
- Chairman: U Nu
- Founded: 1–3 March 1945
- Dissolved: June 1958
- Preceded by: Anti-Fascist Organisation
- Succeeded by: Clean AFPFL; Stable AFPFL
- Ideology: Anti-fascism; Burmese nationalism Democratic socialism Anti-communism (From January 1953); Anti-imperialism; Faction: Marxism (Until October 1948)
- Political position: Left-wing; Faction: Far-left (Until October 1948)
- Religion: Theravada Buddhism (From January 1958)
- Colours: Red

Party flag

The Anti-Fascist People's Freedom League (AFPFL) (Note: Burmese: ဖက်ဆစ်ဆန့်ကျင်ရေး ပြည်သူ့လွတ်လပ်ရေး အဖွဲ့ချုပ်, pronounced [pʰɛʔsʰɪʔ sʰa̰ɰ̃tɕɪ̀ɰ̃jé pjìðṵ lʊʔlaʔjé əpʰwɛ̰dʑoʊʔ]; abbreviated ဖဆပလ, hpa hsa pa la) was a broad left-wing popular front that ruled Burma (now Myanmar) between 1947 and 1958. It included both political parties and trade unions as members.

The league evolved out of the anti-Japanese resistance organization Anti-Fascist Organisation (AFO) founded in August 1944 during the Japanese occupation by the Communist Party of Burma (CPB), the Burma National Army and the socialist People's Revolutionary Party (PRP). The AFO was renamed AFPFL in March 1945.

An AFPFL delegation under the leadership of Aung San led the negotiations for independence in London in January 1947. After winning the elections of April 1947 for a Constitutional Assembly, the AFPFL leadership drafted the new constitution for a sovereign Burma. It initially included a Marxist faction led by Thakin Than Tun, but they were purged from the party in October 1948.

The AFPFL determined Burma's post-independence politics and policies until June 1958, when the party split into two factions, the Clean AFPFL and the Stable AFPFL.

== History ==
=== Fight for independence ===
The origins of the league go back to the clandestine anti-Japanese resistance organization AFO that was founded by the Communist Party of Burma (CPB) led by Thakin Soe, the Burma National Army (BNA) led by Aung San, and three socialists from the People's Revolutionary Party (PRP), Kyaw Nyein, Thakin Chit, and Ba Swe in August 1944. The AFO was renamed Anti-Fascist People's Freedom League at a meeting held from 1–3 March 1945. The name change indicated that the aim of the organization was both to liberate Burma from the Japanese and achieve independence.

The communist leaders Thakin Soe and Thakin Than Tun served as first president respectively general secretary of the league. Personal issues led to Thakin Soe's ouster from the CPB and consequently to his absence at the first post-war conference of the AFPFL held at the Naythurain theater on the Kandawgyi Lake from 16 to 19 August 1945 in Rangoon. Aung San chaired the conference and eventually superseded Thakin Soe as president of the AFPFL.

Dissent and ideological rifts with the communists over leadership and strategy in the independence struggle began soon to emerge within the league. Thakin Soe, after splitting from the CPB and forming the Red Flag Communist Party, started a rebellion in 1946. Though the CPB, dubbed the White Flag Communists, continued to co-operate with the AFPFL, its leader Thakin Than Tun resigned as general secretary in July 1946 after contentions with Aung San and other AFPFL leaders, and was replaced by the socialist Kyaw Nyein. When Aung San accepted in September 1946 the British governor's invitation to lead the Executive Council and became the de facto premier of Burma, the communists accused him of having sold out to the British and settled for a "sham independence". In November, the CPB was officially expelled from the AFPFL.

In January 1947, Aung San and other AFPFL leaders such as Thakin Mya, Tin Tut, and Kyaw Nyein negotiated in London the independence for Burma. The British however made independence contingent upon the agreement of Burma's major ethnic minorities. Therefore, Aung San and other AFPFL colleagues among them Aung Zan Wai, Pe Khin, Bo Hmu Aung, Sir Maung Gyi, Myoma U Than Kywe and Sein Mya Maung took part in the Panglong Conference in February 1947 and convinced representatives from the Shan, Kachin, Chin and Kayah to support the negotiations for independence and join the future independent state of Burma.

General elections for a constitutional assembly were held in April 1947, which the AFPFL won amidst an election boycott by the opposition, taking 173 of the 210 seats and running unopposed in over fifty constituencies. Aung San headed the constitutional assembly and was set to become Burma's prime minister, but was assassinated together with six other members of his cabinet on 19 July, a date commemorated as Martyrs' Day. U Nu succeeded Aung San as leader of the AFPFL and Premier of Burma

=== Independence and civil war ===
Burma declared independence from Britain in January 1948, and the CPB went underground the following March after U Nu ordered the arrest of its leaders for inciting rebellion. Other groups also soon dropped out of the AFPFL to join the rebellion, not only the White-band faction of the People's Volunteer Organisation (PVO) formed by Aung San as a paramilitary force out of the demobbed veterans, but also a large part of the Burma Rifles led by communist commanders calling themselves the Revolutionary Burma Army (RBA). The AFPFL government had plunged into civil war with not only Burman insurgent groups but also ethnic minorities including the Karen National Union (KNU), Mon, Pa-O, nationalist Rakhine and the Mujahideen of Rakhine Muslims.

The first post-independence general elections were held over several months in 1951 and 1952, with the AFPFL and its allies winning 199 of the 250 seats in the Chamber of Deputies.

=== Parliamentary rule and split ===
Although the AFPFL was returned to office again in the 1956 elections, the results came as a shock as the opposition left-wing coalition, known as the National United Front (NUF) and led by Aung Than, older brother of Aung San, won 37% of the vote and 48 seats in the Chamber of Deputies.

By 1958, despite an economic recovery and the unexpected success of U Nu's "Arms for Democracy" offer that saw the surrender of a large number of insurgents, most notably the PVO, the AFPFL had become riven with internal splits, which worsened following the party's congress in January 1958. In July 1958 it formally split, with one group led by Prime Minister U Nu, which he named the "Clean AFPFL"; the other was led by Kyaw Nyein and Ba Swe and was known as the Stable AFPFL.

The majority of AFPFL MPs were supporters of the Stable faction, but U Nu was able to narrowly escape defeat in parliamentary motion of no-confidence by only eight votes with the support of the opposition NUF. Still dogged by the "multicoloured insurgency", the army hardliners feared the communists being allowed to rejoin mainstream politics through Nu's need for continued support by the NUF, and was compounded by the Shan Federal Movement lobbying for a loose federation. The volatile situation culminated in a military caretaker government under General Ne Win that presided over the 1960 general elections, which were won by U Nu's Clean AFPFL.

Following the restoration of multi-party democracy after the 8888 Uprising, two new parties were established using the AFPFL name, the AFPFL (founded 1988) and the AFPFL (Original). Both contested the 1990 elections, but received less than 0.05% of the vote and failed to win a seat.

== Policies ==
The league with its different political parties and mass and class organizations was held together by the common leadership of first Aung San and then U Nu. During its time in office, the AFPFL pursued a nationalist policy based on unity and consensus, upheld parliamentary democracy and presided over a mixed economy comprising both state and private enterprise. In January 1953, it adopted an ideological position which clearly rejected any form of totalitarianism, Communism and Marxism, identified as synonymous along with any form of Imperialism. It spent most of this period in its history fighting several communist, socialist and ethnic separatist rebel groups for control over the future of the country. It also fought a successful war against Nationalist Chinese (KMT) forces who occupied the far north of the country for several years after the KMT's defeat by the Chinese Communist Party. Its foreign policy followed strict neutrality supporting the Bandung Conference of 1955, shunning the South-East Asia Treaty Organisation (SEATO) on account of the American support of the KMT on one hand, and facing the communist insurgencies on the other.

== Leadership ==
=== President ===
- President Thakin Soe (1944–1945)
- President U Aung San (1945–1947)
- President U Nu (1947–1958)

=== General secretary ===
- General Secretary Thakin Than Tun (1945–1946)
- General Secretary Kyaw Nyein (1946–1956)
- General Secretary Thakin Kyaw Tun (1956–1958)

== Election results ==
Election	Party leader	Votes	%	Seats	+/–	Position	Government
1947	Aung San	1,755,000		173 / 210	▲173	▲1st	Supermajority government
1951–1952	U Nu			199 / 250	▲26	1st	Supermajority government
1956	U Nu	1,844,614	47.7%	147 / 250	▼52	1st	Majority government

== Bibliography ==
- Ba, Maw (1968). Breakthrough in Burma Memoirs of a Revolution, 1939–1946. pp. 434 pp.
- Cavendish, Marshall (2007). World and Its Peoples: Eastern and Southern Asia. Marshall Cavendish Corporation. ISBN 978-0-7614-7631-3.
- Fleischmann, Klaus (1989). Documents on communism in Burma, 1945-1977. Institut für Asienkunde. ISBN 978-3-88910-057-3.
- Fukui, Haruhiro (1985). Political parties of Asia and the Pacific. Santa Barbara: Greenwood Press.
- Johnstone, William Crane (1963). Burma's foreign policy: a study in neutralism. Harvard University Press.
- U Maung Maung (1990). Burmese Nationalist Movements 1940–1948. Honolulu: University of Hawaii Press.
- Prager-Nyein, Susanne; Nyein, Tun Kyaw (2016). "Setting the Stage for the Final Struggle. The Naythurain Conference". In Chandler, David P.; Cribb, Robert; Narangoa, Li (eds.). End of Empire. 100 Days in 1945 that Changed Asia and the World. Copenhagen: Nordic Institute of Asian Studies.
- Seekins, Donald M. (2006). Historical Dictionary of Burma (Myanmar). Scarecrow Press.
- Thomson, John Seabury (1960). "Marxism in Burma". In Trager, Frank N (ed.). Marxism in South East Asia. Stanford University Press. ISBN 978-0-8047-0592-9.
