= Union Party (Burma) =

Union Party ပြည်ထောင်စုပါတီ
- Abbreviation: ပထစ (Burmese)
- Chairperson: U Nu
- Founded: June 1958
- Banned: 1964
- Split from: AFPFL
- Ideology: Anti-fascism; Burmese nationalism Democratic socialism Social conservatism
- Political position: Left-wing with Syncretic elements
- National affiliation: National United Front
- Colors: Red

Party flag

The Union Party (Burmese: ပြည်ထောင်စုပါတီ, romanized: Pyidaungsu Pati) was the ruling political party in Burma in the late 1950s and early 1960s. Formed by a split in the Anti-Fascist People's Freedom League, it was initially known as the Clean Anti-Fascist People's Freedom League (Clean AFPFL) or Nu-Tin faction.

== History ==
The party was formed in June 1958 when the AFPFL split in two following internal disputes that had intensified since its January congress; One group was led by Prime Minister U Nu, which he named the "Clean AFPFL"; the other was led by Kyaw Nyein and Ba Swe and became known as the Stable AFPFL. The Clean faction was occasionally referred to as the Nu-Tin faction, referring to its other leader Thakin Tin, and contained several groups from different political streams, including the left-wing Pongyi Kyaung faction of the Burma Socialist Party and conservative commercial interest groups.

Although the Stable faction was supported by the larger group of AFPFL members in the Chamber of Deputies, U Nu was able to continue as Prime Minister due to support from the National United Front and some of the independent MPs. However, the dispute between the two factions continued to worsen and in September 1958 the Army brokered a compromise, taking power with a government headed by Ne Win until elections were held eighteen months later.

In the 1960 elections campaign the Clean AFPFL promised increased autonomy for the Mon and Rakhine minorities, and that Buddhism would become the state religion, gaining it support from the Buddhist clergy. It received 57% of the vote, winning 158 of the 250 seats in the Chamber of Deputies and 53 of the 125 seats in the Chamber of Nationalities, allowing U Nu to return as Prime Minister. Following the elections, it adopted the Union Party name.

In 1962 U Nu's government was overthrown by a military coup led by Ne Win. In 1964, Ne Win's Burma Socialist Programme Party became the sole legal political party.
