= Union of Burma =

State in Southeast Asia (1948–1962)

Coordinates: 16°51′N 096°11′E

Union of Burma ပြည်ထောင်စုမြန်မာနိုင်ငံတော်‌ (Burmese) Pyidaunzu Myăma Nainngandaw
- 1948–1962
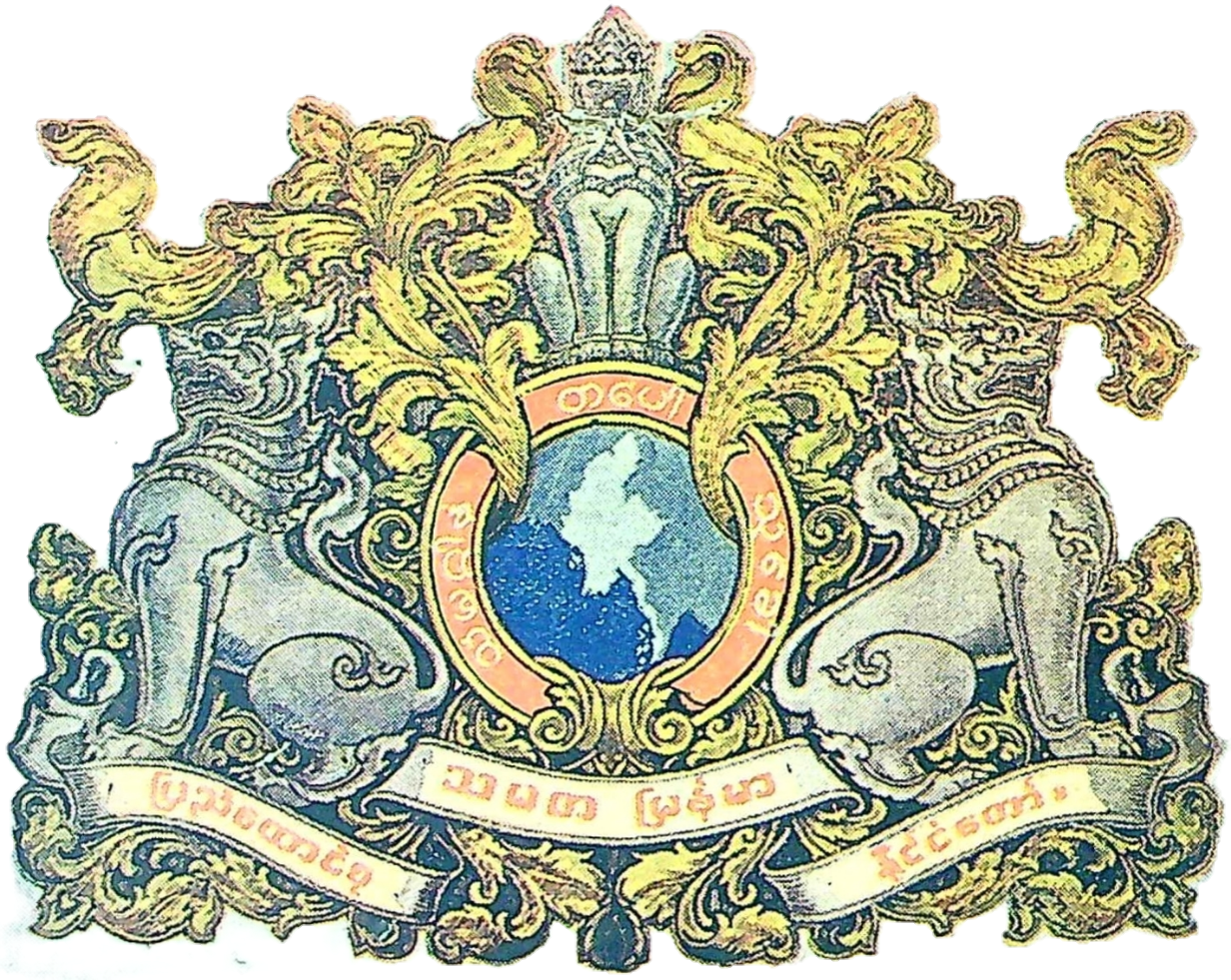
- Flag Seal
- Motto: သမဂ္ဂါနံ တပေါ သုခေါ (Pali); Sa.ma.ganam ta.pau: su.hkau: "Happiness through harmony"
- Anthem: ကမ္ဘာမကြေ (Burmese); Kaba Ma Kyei "Till the End of the World"
- Capital: Rangoon
- Official languages: Burmese
- Recognised languages: English (Note: The 1947 Constitution of the Union of Burma states: "The official language of the Union shall be Burmese, provided that the use of the English language may be permitted.")
- Religion: Buddhism (majority; state religion from 1961)
- Demonym: Burmese
- Government: Unitary parliamentary republic
- President
  - 1948–1952 (first): Sao Shwe Thaik
  - 1957–1962 (last): Win Maung
- Prime Minister
  - 1948–1956 (first): U Nu
  - 1960–1962 (last): U Nu
- Legislature: Union Parliament
  - Upper house: Chamber of Nationalities
  - Lower house: Chamber of Deputies
- Historical era: Cold War
  - Independence Act: 10 December 1947
  - Established: 4 January 1948
  - 1962 coup d'état: 2 March 1962
- Currency: Burmese rupee (1948–1952); Burmese kyat (after 1952)
- ISO 3166 code: BU
Preceded by	Succeeded by
British Burma	Union of Burma
- Today part of: Myanmar

The Union of Burma was the official name, from 1948 to 1962, of the country in Southeast Asia now known as Myanmar. The first 14 years of independent Burma were marred by several communist and ethnic insurgencies. Prominent insurgent groups during this period included the Communist Party of Burma (CPB, "white flags") led by Thakin Than Tun, the Communist Party (RFCP, "red flags") led by Thakin Soe, the People's Volunteer Organisation (PVO) led by Bo La Yaung (a member of the Thirty Comrades), the Revolutionary Burma Army (RBA) led by communist officers Bo Zeya, Bo Yan Aung and Bo Yè Htut (all three of them members of the Thirty Comrades), and the Karen National Union (KNU).

== History ==
Remote areas of northern Burma were for many years controlled by an army of Kuomintang (KMT) forces after the Communist victory in China in 1949. Burma accepted foreign assistance in rebuilding the country in these early years, but continued American support for the Chinese Nationalist military presence in Burma finally resulted in the country rejecting most foreign aid, refusing to join the Southeast Asia Treaty Organisation (SEATO) and supporting the Bandung Conference of 1955. Burma generally strove to be impartial in world affairs and was one of the first countries in the world to recognise Israel and China.

By 1958, the country was largely beginning to recover economically, but was beginning to fall apart politically due to a split in the Anti-Fascist People's Freedom League (AFPFL) into two factions, one led by Thakins Nu and Tin, the other by Ba Swe and Kyaw Nyein. This was despite the unexpected success of U Nu's "Arms for Democracy" offer taken up by U Seinda in Arakan, the Pa'O, some Mon and Shan groups, but more significantly by the PVO surrendering their arms. The situation became very unstable in parliament, with U Nu surviving a no-confidence vote only with the support of the opposition National United Front (NUF), believed to have "crypto-communists" amongst them.

Army hardliners now saw the 'threat' of the CPB coming to an agreement with U Nu through the NUF, and in the end U Nu "invited" Army Chief of Staff General Ne Win to take over the country. Over 400 "communist sympathisers" were arrested, of which 153 were deported to the Coco Islands in the Andaman Sea. Among them was the NUF leader Aung Than, older brother of Aung San. The Botataung, Kyemon and Rangoon Daily were also closed down.

Ne Win's caretaker government successfully stabilised the situation and paved the way for new general elections in 1960 that returned U Nu's Union Party with a large majority. The situation did not remain stable for long, when the Shan Federal Movement, started by Nyaung Shwe Sawbwa Sao Shwe Thaik (the first President of independent Burma 1948–1952) and aspiring to a "loose" federation, was seen as a separatist movement insisting on the government honouring the right to secession in ten years provided for by the 1947 Constitution.

Ne Win had already succeeded in stripping the Shan Sawbwas of their feudal powers in exchange for comfortable pensions for life in 1959. He staged a coup d'état on 2 March 1962, arrested U Nu, Sao Shwe Thaik and several others, and declared a socialist state run by the Union Revolutionary Council (URC), which consisted of senior military officers. Sao Shwe Thaik's son, Sao Mye Thaik, was shot dead in what was generally described as a "bloodless" coup. Thibaw Sawbwa Sao Kya Seng also disappeared mysteriously after being stopped at a checkpoint near Taunggyi. The URC later founded the Burma Socialist Programme Party (BSPP) on 4 July 1962 to nominally separate the powers of the military from the government and to lead a one-party state.
