= Ba Swe =

Prime Minister of Burma from 1956 to 1957

His Excellency U Ba Swe
- ဘဆွေ
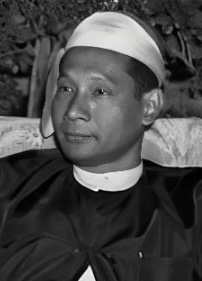
- Ba Swe in 1955

2nd Prime Minister of Union of Burma
- In office 12 June 1956 – 25 February 1957
- Preceded by: U Nu
- Succeeded by: U Nu

Personal details
- Born: 17 October 1915 Tavoy, British Burma
- Died: 6 December 1987 (aged 72) Rangoon, Burma
- Party: AFPFL (before 1958); Stable AFPFL (1958–1964)
- Spouse: Nu Nu Swe
- Children: 10
- Education: Rangoon University
- Occupation: Former Prime Minister, Politician

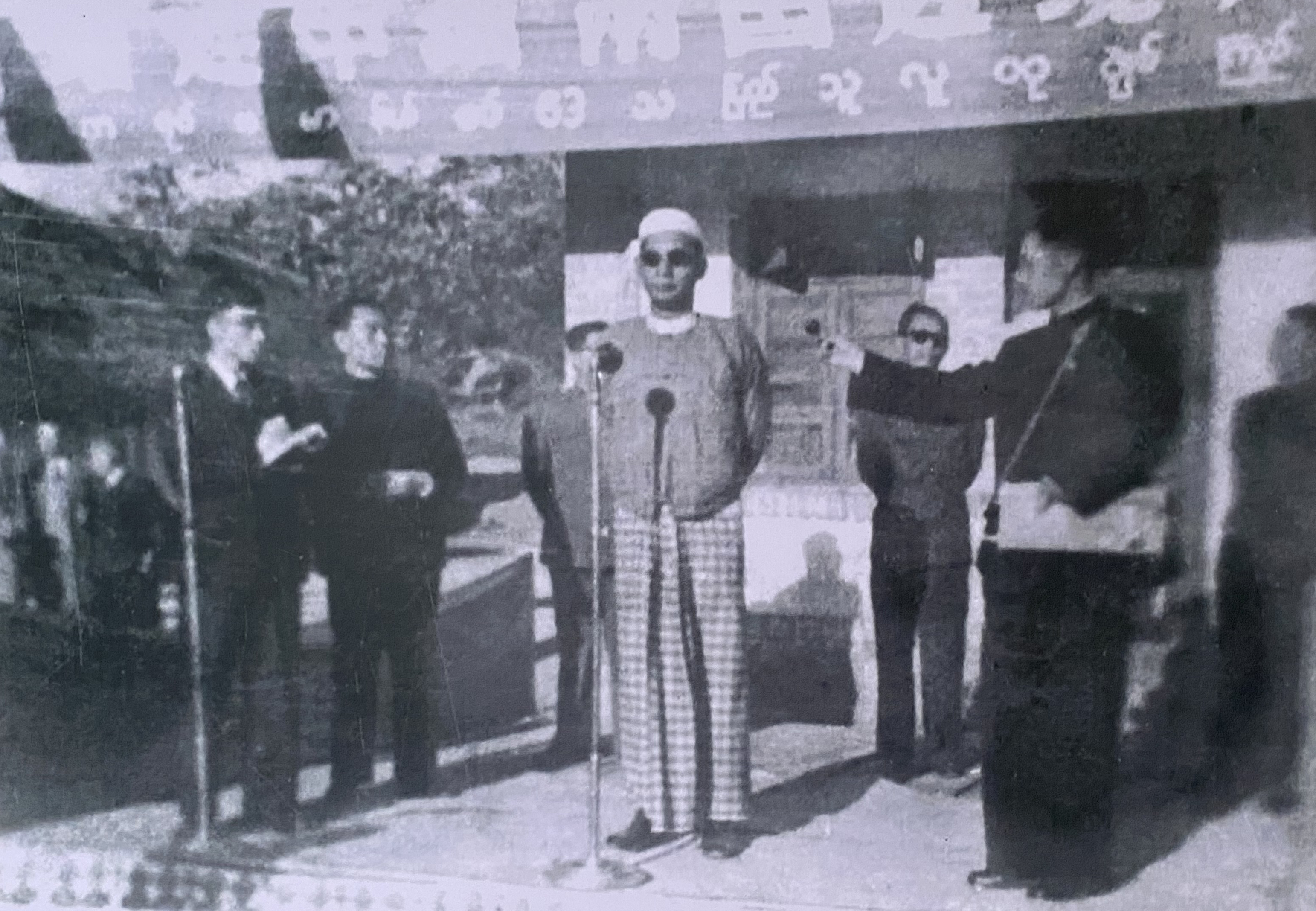
Ba Swe speech on 1956 Mangshi Sino-Burmese Border People Friendship Celebratory Conference

Ba Swe (Burmese: ဘဆွေ, pronounced [ba̰ sʰwè]; 17 October 1915 – 6 December 1987) was the second Prime Minister of Burma. He was a leading Burmese politician during the decade after the country gained its independence from Britain in 1948. He held the position of prime minister from 12 June 1956 to 28 February 1957. When Ba Swe became prime minister, Time magazine reported the news in an article titled: "The Day of the Tiger" based on his nickname 'Big Tiger' (Kyah gyi Ba Swe) since his university days in the 1930s as a student leader.

His name was often paired with the name of another famous student leader as Ba Hein and Ba Swe, both Thakins or members of the nationalist Dobama Asiayone (We Burmans Association) and were arrested by the British colonial government during the year of countrywide protests, demonstrations and strikes in 1938 known as the "1300 Revolution" (Htaung thoun ya byei ayeidawbon named after the Burmese calendar year). Ba Hein became a founder member of the Communist Party of Burma (CPB) in 1939 and shortly afterwards Ba Swe and Ba Hein among others founded the People's Revolutionary Party (PRP), renamed the Burma Socialist Party after the war. Ba Swe was also known for his penchant for wearing dark glasses.

== Family ==
In 1942, Ba Swe married Nu Nu Swe, daughter of U Hlaing Phyu, the owner of mining and lands in Palaw Township, Mergui District. They had ten children.

== Premiership ==
Ba Swe assumed the premiership in the aftermath of the parliamentary elections held in early 1956. Though the ruling Anti-Fascist People's Freedom League (AFPFL – hpa hsa pa la) was returned, the leftist coalition of parties known as the National United Front (NUF – pa ma nya ta) won 37% of the vote. The number of NUF seats in Parliament was increased. However, on account of the 'first-past-the-post' electoral system, the NUF's representation in the Burmese Parliament was not reflected in the seats that it obtained. Still, the 1956 election results came as a shock to the AFPFL government. U Nu, the Prime Minister at the time, temporarily relinquished his office in order to devote full-time to reorganizing and strengthening the AFPFL. Ba Swe, as a deputy of U Nu in the AFPFL and leader of the Socialist Party, took over the job from U Nu. After less than nine months, U Nu resumed office as prime minister on 28 February 1957.

== AFPFL split ==
By mid-1958 Ba Swe had fallen out with his senior colleague U Nu. The AFPFL split into two factions, and Ba Swe, together with his colleague Kyaw Nyein and thirteen other ministers, resigned from the government on 4 June 1958 and tabled a motion of no-confidence against U Nu in Parliament. On 8 June 1958 the no-confidence motion was put to a vote in Parliament but the government of U Nu survived the motion by a mere 8 votes because the leftist NUF voted with the government.

Allegedly due to the instability arising from the split in the AFPFL and to the escalating insurgent problems U Nu on 26 September 1958 'voluntarily' invited the Army Chief of Staff General Ne Win to take over as prime minister in a 'caretaker' capacity for an initial period of six months. On 28 October 1958 the Burmese Parliament, with the support of members from both factions of the AFPFL but in the face of opposition from the NUF, voted to appoint General Ne Win as prime minister in a 'caretaker government'. (In his memoirs, entitled "Saturday's Son," translated by U Law Yone and first published in 1974, U Nu claimed that his handover of power was not 'voluntary' but that a group of Army Officers led by Brigadier Aung Gyi and Brigadier Maung Maung threatened him with a 'straight military coup' should he refuse to hand over power to Ne Win.)

== Election defeat ==
In the February 1960 elections, held during General Ne Win's caretaker government, the faction of AFPFL led by Ba Swe and Kyaw Nyein, aka Swe-Nyein faction (ဆွေငြိမ်းအဖွဲ့), contested as Stable AFPFL (တည်မြဲဖဆပလ, Ti myè hpa hsa pa la). The faction led by U Nu and Thakin Tin, aka Nu-Tin faction, previously known as Clean AFPFL (သန့်ရှင်းဖဆပလ; Thant shin hpa hsa pa la), formed a new party known as the 'Union Party' (ပြည်ထောင်စုပါတီ, Pyidaungsu Party or ပထစ). U Nu's Union Party won the 1960 elections by a landslide.

== Military era ==
Ba Swe was out of power and regarded as a 'dead tiger' politically at the time of General Ne Win's coup d'état in March 1962. Hence he was not among those detained by Ne Win's Union Revolutionary Council. However, at the time of the 1963 peace parley between the RC and various armed insurgent groups, Ba Swe, like many other Burmese politicians of the left and the right during that period, was detained.

Ba Swe and U Nu, his former senior colleague and later adversary, were released on 27 October 1966. On the day of their release, both Ba Swe and U Nu were driven to the office of the Revolutionary Council Chairman General Ne Win where Ne Win told them that if they wished to go on a pilgrimage either within the country or abroad, the government would bear their expenses. Ne Win also suggested that both might wish to go abroad for a 'medical check-up'.

Ba Swe, together with U Nu and Kyaw Nyein, was among the thirty-three-men 'Internal Unity Advisory Board' that Ne Win's Revolutionary Council formed on 2 December 1968. The Board was to report to the RC by 31 May 1969 on ways of promoting national unity.

Ba Swe died in Rangoon in December 1987.

Political offices
Preceded by U Nu	Prime Minister of Burma; 1956–1957	Succeeded by U Nu
