= 1962 Burmese coup d'état =

Military coup by Ne Win

- Part of the Myanmar conflict and the Cold War
Date	2 March 1962
Location	Rangoon, Burma
Result	Coup successful: Civilian government replaced by a military junta

Belligerents
Government of Burma: Union Party (Clean AFPFL)	Tatmadaw: Burma Army

Commanders and leaders
Win Maung (President of Burma); U Nu (Prime Minister of Burma); Samaduwa Sinhwanaung (President-designate of Burma)	Ne Win (Chief of Staff of the Tatmadaw)

Casualties and losses
- 1–2 killed

The 1962 Burmese coup d'état (Note: Burmese: ၁၉၆၂ မြန်မာနိုင်ငံစစ်အာဏာသိမ်းခံရခြင်း, MLCTS: 1962 Mranmanuingngam cacanasim: hkamra.hkrang:, pronounced [mjàɴmànàɪɴŋàɴ sɪʔʔànàθéɪɴ kʰàɴja̰tɕʰɪ́ɴ]) marked the beginning of one-party rule in Burma (Myanmar) and the political dominance of the military in Burmese politics. In the 2 March 1962 coup, the military replaced the civilian AFPFL-government headed by Prime Minister U Nu with the Union Revolutionary Council Chaired by General Ne Win.

In the first 12 years following the coup, the country was ruled under martial law, and saw a significant expansion in the military's role in the national economy, politics, and state bureaucracy. Following the constitution of 1974, the Revolutionary Council handed over the power to the elected government, consisting of a single-party, the Burma Socialist Programme Party, which had been founded by the council in 1962. The elected government remained hybrid between civilian and military, until 18 September 1988, when the military again took over as the State Law and Order Restoration Council (then renamed the State Peace and Development Council) following the nationwide 8888 Uprising and virtual breakdown of the socialist regime. The military junta retained power for 23 years until 2011, when it was transferred to the Union Solidarity and Development Party.

== Background ==
After the end of the Second World War and Burma's independence in 1948, Burma became a democratic socialist country and joined the Non-Aligned Movement. The elected Prime Minister U Nu appointed Ne Win as Chief of Staff of the Armed Forces, on 1 February 1949, and was given total control of the army, replacing General Smith Dun, an ethnic Karen.

However, the degraded economy and social disorder placed emphasis on the military. In October 1958, when instability in society rose to a level approaching a national security crisis, the civilian government and Prime Minister U Nu asked the military and Ne Win to step in as a temporary caretaker government. Once the political order had been restored, the caretaker government was expected to execute general elections and restore civilian rule.

Public support for the army was strengthened after the army facilitated the 1960 elections and acknowledged the authority of the elected civil government Anti-Fascist People's Freedom League (AFPFL), led by U Nu.

Yet the general public continued to perceive the elected government as corrupt, inept at ruling the country, and unable to restore law and order in a Burmese society characterised by ever-increasing crime rates. The military continued to be perceived as crucial to ensuring social stability, which was a high priority among the Burmese people following years of colonialism and World War II.

== Coup d'état ==
Less than two years after the caretaker government had handed power back to the AFPFL-government, on 2 March 1962, Ne Win again seized power in a military-staged coup d'état. Before the coup, Samaduwa Sinhwanaung, Chief Minister of Kachin State and close ally with Prime Minister U Nu, was designated as president for next 5 years by Union Parliament on 28 February 1962. However he did not take office because of the coup. Ne Win became head of state as Chairman of the Union Revolutionary Council and also Prime Minister. He arrested U Nu, Sao Shwe Thaik, and several others, and declared a socialist state run by a "Revolutionary Council" of senior military officers. Sao Shwe Thaik's son, Sao Mye Thaik, who was 17 at the time, was shot dead in what was generally described as a "bloodless" coup by the world's media. Thibaw Sawbwa Sao Kya Seng also disappeared mysteriously after being stopped at a checkpoint near Taunggyi.

Following riots at Rangoon University in July 1962, troops were sent to restore order. They fired on protesters and destroyed the student union building. Shortly afterward, Ne Win addressed the nation in a five-minute radio speech which concluded with the statement: "If these disturbances were made to challenge us, I have to declare that we will fight sword with sword and spear with spear." On 13 July 1962, less than a week after the speech, Ne Win left for Austria, Switzerland, and the United Kingdom "for a medical check up".

All universities were closed for more than two years until September 1964.

In 1988, 26 years later, Ne Win denied any involvement in the dynamiting of the Student Union building, stating that his deputy Brigadier Aung Gyi, who he had fallen out with and dismissed by that time, had given the order to dynamite the building. Ne Win further stated that he himself, as a "revolutionary leader", had to take responsibility for the incident by giving the "sword with sword and spear with spear" speech.

=== Strategy ===
Due to the AFPFL-government's weak position in society, the coup was not unexpected, and Ne Win had been urged to seize power by members of the army. Several foreign governments considered the military takeover a logical, if not positive, development.

The coup was executed with the arrest of Prime Minister U Nu, five other cabinet members, the Chief of Justice, and around thirty politicians and former leaders from the states of Shan and Kayah. Only one person was killed, the son of general Sao Shwe Thaik, which is why the coup has been described as bloodless.

The descriptions of the coup vary in the scholarly literature, when it comes to how militarily coordinated the coup was. According to historian Robert H. Taylor, Ne Win assumed power in secrecy, without the knowledge of even the deputy commander of the armed forced, Brigadier General Aung Gyi. Just 28 officers were involved in the operation, and only Ne Win knew the date of the coup.

In contrast, historian Mary P. Callahan describes the coup as a highly coordinated military accomplishment that "deployed troops and tanks in an overt seizure of power." Whereas Taylor ascribes greater influence to Ne Win as an individual in staging the coup, Callahan mentions Ne Win as one amongst a number of agents, including field commanders, tank commanders, and administrative personnel, who were involved in the coup. In fact, Callahan argues that the coup illustrated that the military acted as a united, bureaucratised entity, and that it might be this unity that explains the durability of the authoritarian rule that followed.

== Causes for the coup ==
There have been various explanations to why the military, headed by Ne Win, staged the military coup less than two years after acknowledging the authority of the civilian government.

A reason, which is highlighted by multiple historians, is that the coup was a response to a growing fear within the army that the Union of Burma was drifting towards disintegration under the AFPFL-Government.

This explanation resonates with the one given by the army in the official press release following the coup. By 1962 the integrity of the country was seen as threatened by the two minorities, the Shan and Kayah, who were claiming their right, given by the 1947 constitution, to withdraw from the Union. On top of this the Shan leaders were beginning to form an armed opposition against Yangon to claim Shan "national determination". The army and Ne Win saw it as their responsibility to protect the cohesion of the Union and in the official press release the coup was presented as a necessity due to the policies of the AFPFL-government. Especially problematic was U Nu's attempt to make Buddhism the state religion, since it contributed to the Christian minorities' motivation to fight for autonomy.

Furthermore, the army believed that the federal system and parliament-style government was inherently weak and encouraged local autonomy. The multiple voices represented in parliament were seen as evoking instability and enhancing ethnic differences that would bring down the Union. The army thus argued that there was a need for a strong central government to secure the integration of the nation.

Additionally, the military rule justified the abolition of the political system by saying that multi-party democracy served the wealthy in society in being open to politicians representing capitalists and landlords. This critique of the political system served both as a reason for conducting the coup but also as a justification of the state structures and policies that were implemented in the subsequent years.

The increased autonomy in peripheral areas was also seen as problematic in terms of external threats. The army believed that if the areas got too independent they would attract foreign powers – a risk that seemed great with the Cold War context of 1962. In 1962 it was clear that the United States had a great interest in Asian countries bordering communist powers, which meant that Burma was a possible subject of interest with the country's borders to China.

If the union dissolved and the Shan and Kayah States claimed autonomy it meant that the states could pursue independent foreign policy and engage in alliances with powerful states like the United States. Due to the international security status an alliance like this would create a significant security threat to the rest of the country, with an increased risk of a conflict between the United States and China on Burmese territory.

Furthermore, the regional context served as argument to prevent the union from dissolving. The instability of divided Vietnam and Laos underlined the need to retain central control with the frontier states. In this scenario of external threats and an internal threat of disintegration, the civilian government was perceived as inadequate to protect the country.

Additionally, personal rivalry in the government damaged the cohesion and the power of the already weak AFPFL. In turn, Ne Win and the army feared that a split in the party would induce further instability. This fear was enhanced when U Nu announced that he would not run for office in the following election, which in turn increased the incentive to stage the coup.

Historians differ when it comes to the importance of Ne Win as an individual leader in explaining why the coup was established and successfully executed. Aung Thwin & Aung Thwin argue that Ne Win possessed political legitimacy founded in Burmese culture and history, which enabled him to seize power in the 1962 coup. Ne Win's political credentials were based on his fighting for the country in the 1940s and the fact that he served as a trusted lieutenant to Aung San, who was considered to be a national hero.

In contrast Callahan argues that neither the specific character of Ne Win nor the threat of disintegration were the decisive causes for the staging of the coup, since these factors were present throughout the 1950s, without them leading to an army intervention. Instead Callahan suggests that the coup was a result of inter-elite conflicts over the state structures, and who possessed the legitimate claim on the state. Long-term structural development led to shifting fortunes of the military and political elites, which created: "... winners and losers, rulers and ruled, citizens and enemies."

By the time of the coup in 1962 the state was structured in favour of the military, which had developed into a "bureaucratized, and central institution, capable of eliminating such challenges to its claims over state power."

The consolidation of the military was a result of lengthy periods of wars, as well as intra-military struggles, which led to a purge of army commanders who had tense relationships with Ne Win. In this way Callahan argues that Ne Win seized power at a time where there were no genuine obstacles due to the strong character of the military.

== Political system ==
=== Revolutionary council ===
Immediately after the coup Ne Win and a number of senior military officers formed the Revolutionary Council, which consisted of sixteen senior military officers and Ne Win as the council's chairman. Furthermore, the Revolutionary Government Cabinet was established with eight senior military officers from the council. Ne Win also chaired this group. The aim of Revolution Council was to lead an anti-colonial revolution and reassert the state.

Revolutionary council replaced the AFPFL-government and the day after the establishing of the new governmental body, the council abolished fundamental state institutions established with the 1947 constitution. This included the two houses of the Hluttaw (the parliament), the central legislature and the regional councils – the channel of communication from the ethnic states to Yangon. The bureaucratic power embedded in these institutions was transferred to the Revolutionary Council and Ne Win.

The concentration of power in the hands of Ne Win continued on 5 March 1962 when he undertook all executive, legislate and judicial authority by virtue of being the Chairman of the Revolutionary Council. As head of both the Revolutionary Council and the Revolutionary Government Cabinet Taylor argues that: "... Ne Win in theory possessed all state power and thus achieved a position of formal dominance within the state unprecedented since 1885."

The Revolutionary Council's political dominance was further ensured by making all institutions that were not eliminated by law dependent on the council either through their personnel or through finances, which prevented them from organising any opposition.

The coup created a policy vacuum, where the Revolutionary Council and Ne Win could realise their ideas for society, but Ne Win needed a rationale for implementing his political agenda that would resonate with the population. This led to the formulation of the Burmese Way to Socialism, which was presented to the public on 7 May 1962.

=== The Burmese Way to Socialism ===
The state ideology The Burmese Way to Socialism had the aim of centralising the economy and limiting foreign influence on businesses. The anti-communist military resorting to a leftist ideology was perceived as surprising by external agents. But according to Historian Maung A. Myoe the inclusion of Marxism strengthened and prolonged the political dominance of the army, since it enabled the neutralisation of the communism, while projecting the army as revolutionary institution that could ensure the population's socialists' demands.

In a security perspective the leftist state ideology furthermore minimised the risk of Chinese attacks, which in 1962 constituted the largest external threat to Myanmar.

To secure public support of the ideology the Marxist elements were supplemented with Buddhist concepts to create ideological objectives that were compatible with the morals of the country's Buddhist majority. The socialism applied thus became a localised version, fitted to the Burmese identity. The priorities in the ideological framework were the establishing of a socialist economy and the interests of the peasants, who comprised the largest group in society, and potentially the biggest threat to the government. To distinguish the Burmese Way to Socialism from communism, Ne Win argued that the socialist system of Burma should benefit all people of society and that the business class was not seen as the enemy, as long as they supported the Revolutionary Council.

In this sense the objective was a national social revolution across classes. However, since the peasants made up the largest group in society and since this class was perceived as having been neglected under colonial rule as well as by the post-colonial governments, policies to improve the economy and conditions of peasants were prioritised. Furthermore, it was believed that by focusing on the peasants in terms of a coherent social class rather than ethnicity the integration of society could be improved. The notion of ethnicity should be neutralised by developing new community affiliations based on a national cultural identity and a shared public history founded in a Buddhist past.

The implementation of the new ideology was Leninist in its implementation, in the sense that the Revolutionary Council wanted to form a single, legal political party through which all participatory processes would take place. In a meeting on 17 May between the revolutionary council and the civilian party leaders, the leaders announced that they would not participate in establishing a single political party and refused to endorse the Burmese Way to Socialism. According to Taylor it has been debated if the party leaders thought the military would eventually give up its power to the civilian parties, like they had done following the elections in 1960. It has also been suggested that the AFPFL may have expected that the military would, in one way or another, share power with the party, whom it had cooperated with prior to the coup. With the rejection of the civilian parties to conform to the Burmese Way of Socialism, the Revolutionary Council began the building of a party consisting of the political elite, and on 4 July 1962 the Burma Socialist Programme Party (BSPP) was presented. All remaining parties were banned by law.

=== Burma Socialist Programme Party ===
Initially the BSPP was only made up by members of the Revolutionary Council but eventually it also attracted politicians, especially the left-oriented. Furthermore, Ne Win included civil servants and former politicians who were ready to conform to the military rule in the BSPP. Aung Thwin and Aung Thwin argue that the inclusion of individuals, who were a part of the previous administration, is a trait that can be seen in the behaviour of Burmese Kings prior to the colonial rule. The kings used ministers that have served under previous royal opponents. Aung Thwin and Aung Thwin thus suggest that this strategy of engaging people from the former administration in the new political organs is an indigenous historical feature in Myanmar. The opportunity to be a part of BSPP was especially popular among the people, who had been kept outside the power elite of the AFPFL-government.

The objective of the BSPP was to be the main channel for participation and mobilisation of people to support the state. The political orientation of the BSPP was described as the middle way between social democracy and communism, and the party should represent all working people. Thus the party was conceived as an alternative to the parties, which made up the previous governments and was categorised in terms of being either right or left oriented. By claiming to represent all the people the party also aimed at distinguishing itself from communism, which formed an opposition to the landlords and capitalists.

In the first decade following the formation of the BSPP the revolutionary council enjoyed the supremacy over the party. This was in accordance with the party's constitution, which stated that he Revolutionary Council was "the supreme authority of the party during the transitional period of its construction". This hierarchy should later be reversed so the BSPP would lead the Revolutionary Council, and in 1974 with the formation of a new constitution the party took the political leadership in the general elections.

== Aftermath and effects ==
Multiple scholars, including Aung Thwin & Aung Thwin and Taylor, describe how the coup at first didn't affect the lives of the general population in Myanmar. To the majority of the population who worked in agriculture the coup initially improved the living conditions due to the military regime's egalitarian politics which prioritised the peasant. One obvious change for people, though, was that the new power elite would consist of army generals and the channel to obtain status was a military career.

Due to the public trust in the military's capabilities as a keeper of law and order and with the historical precedence from the election in 1960, which suggested that the military would act professionally and hand back power to a civilian government when the time was right, the military coup was met with little objection – neither from domestic nor international actors. According to Aung Thwin & Aung Thwin: "There were no riots or demonstration against it; no country broke diplomatic relations or recalled their ambassadors to reprimand them and certainly no sanctions were imposed." For foreign actors like the United States the coup and the military's anti-communist agenda was considered timely and beneficial, since the military was considered to be able to curb communism and restore political order. Furthermore, no foreign powers opposed the coup since the Revolutionary Council reassured that Myanmar's foreign policy of neutrality in the Cold War would continue.

Despite the limited immediate implication for society at large the military coup resulted in comprehensive societal changes in the subsequent years with the Revolutionary Council's implementation of their policies founded in the Burmese Way to Socialism.

As stated above the coup resulted in the abolition of the 1947 constitution, which eliminated major state institutions and concentrated the power in the Revolutionary Council. From its powerful position the council began a vast nationalisation of the economy, a declaration that all political opposition to the regime was illegal, elimination of institutions rivalling the state and direct government control over legal, cultural and educational institutions as well as all publishing in Myanmar. Furthermore, the military implemented secular policies and broke the tradition of cooperation with the Buddha Sasana Council.

To re-establish what was considered the indigenous Burmese culture and to distinguish the country from its colonial past it became a political objective to move away from values and culture that was considered foreign and external. Concretely the government made Burmese the official language of the Union – as opposed to English. Other initiatives were the promotion of Burmese literature and the changing of street names that referred to prominent British individuals into names of famous Burmese persons. Even Western funding programmes such as the Fulbright scholarship programmes were shut down to ensure that no channels of external influence remained. These policies continue to have implications in Burma today, where English is spoken to a very narrow degree in the general public.

Burma also turned away from the outside world when it came to the economic policies. The Burmanization of the economy included the expulsion of many Chinese and Indians from the country. Ne Win's government prohibited foreigners from owning land and practicing certain professions. By the mid-1960s Myanmar's foreign trade declined and the ratio of foreign trade to GDP declined from 40 per cent in 1960 to 26 per cent in 1970.

The economic policies focused on realising the objective of creating a socialist economy, but initially the question of the nationalisation of the economy constituted a point of conflict within the Revolutionary Council. On 24 April the council met for a two-day meeting to discuss the Burmese Way of Socialism in detail before publishing the statement, and the issue which caused the most negotiations was the question of nationalisation. On 1 January 1963 the Burmese oil industry was nationalised, but only when council member Aung Gyi, who had been pro private businesses, resigned on 8 February 1963 did a comprehensive nationalisation of both foreign and domestic trade as well as the manufacturing and banking sector begin. By March 1964 – two years after the coup – the main part of Myanmar's economy was nationalised.

Due to the Burmese Way to Socialism's focus on improving the lives of the peasants the government chose to prioritise agriculture over industry and manufacturing by initiating policies that directed investment and resources towards the agricultural sector. But during the 26 years of military rule this shift in focus away from the industrial sector had great repercussion for the Burmese economy. By the mid-1980s the neglect of the industrial sector and policies of protecting the peasants from over-taxation and land-seizure meant that the state had limited ability to generate capital to maintain even the most basic services in society. Despite promising the opposite the government demonetised the kyat in 1985 which damaged the public trust in the government. The combination of the demonetisation and the drop in the price of rice and timber severely harmed the population and the agrarian economy. People began taking money out of the banks as yet another demonetisation occurred, which resulted in protests amongst the urban population. The economic downturn meant that the state could not pay its foreign loans, which led to the UN's categorisation of Burma as the Least Developed Country in 1987.

According to Taylor, the lack of economic and democratic development in Burma during the 26 years of military rule under Ne Win resulted in the uprising of 1988, where people in a nationwide demonstration opposed the military dominance in the name of democracy.

== Significance of the 1962 coup ==
Different aspects of the coup can be highlighted as significant depending on how the historical events following the coup are being read and analysed. From the scholarly literature three different narratives of the period following the coup can be deduced:

1. A democracy narrative
2. A cosmopolitan narrative
3. An independence narrative

A common understanding of the coup is the framing of the coup and the decades that followed as a period of autocracy. In this narrative the significance of the coup becomes the military's ability to retain power and suppress democratisation for 26 years. One scholar who to a large extent framed the significance of the coup within this narrative is Callahan, who investigates how the coup brought civilian rule in Burma to "such a definitive end," when authoritarian regimes in neighbouring countries got replaced with more or less democratic political systems. Callahan describes the period that follows the coup as one characterised by significant military presence in society.

Another narrative can be characterised as cosmopolitan and frames the significance of the coup in terms of the following isolation from the international society and disconnectedness due to the state's economic and cultural detachment from the outside. Elements of this narrative are evident in Taylor's account, where the period from 1962 to 1988 is described as one where: "... the state in Burma appeared to much of the rest of the world as isolated and sui generis." Furthermore, Taylor describes how the state practised an economic as well as "general disengagement" from the world, where the Revolutionary Council turned inward to build a new state structure.

Finally the military's decisions to implement policies that distanced Burma from the external world can be understood as period of genuine independence, where the significance of the coup is to be found in the emotional autonomy that came from being economic and cultural independent from British colonial rule. An example of this narrative is found in Aung Thwin & Aung Thwin's analysis, where it is said that the cultural policies of the Revolutionary council were formulated to restore the Burmese culture and "... reject (perhaps forget) the humiliating colonial past." In the same way the policies which protected the peasants from over-taxation and land-seizure are suggested to be a response to the colonial rulers hard taxation of peasants. Within this narrative the significance of the coup is the genuine independence and autonomy that it facilitated.

== Works cited ==
- Aung-Thwin, Michael; Aung-Thwin, Maitrii (2013). A history of Myanmar since ancient times: Traditions and transformations (2nd ed.). London: Reaktion Books. ISBN 978-1861899019.
- Callahan, Mary P. (2004). Making enemies: War and State Building in Burma. Singapore: Singapore University Press. ISBN 0801472679.
- Myoe, Maung A. (2009). Building the Tatmadaw: Myanmar Armed Forces Since 1948. Institute of Southeast Asian Studies. ISBN 978-9812308481.
- Taylor, Robert H. (2009). The State in Myanmar (2nd ed.). Singapore: NUS Press. ISBN 978-0824833626.
- Taylor, Robert H. (2015). General Ne Win: A Political Biography. Singapore: Institute of Southeast Asian Studies.
