= U Nu =

1st Prime Minister of Burma

His Excellency U Nu
- ဦးနု
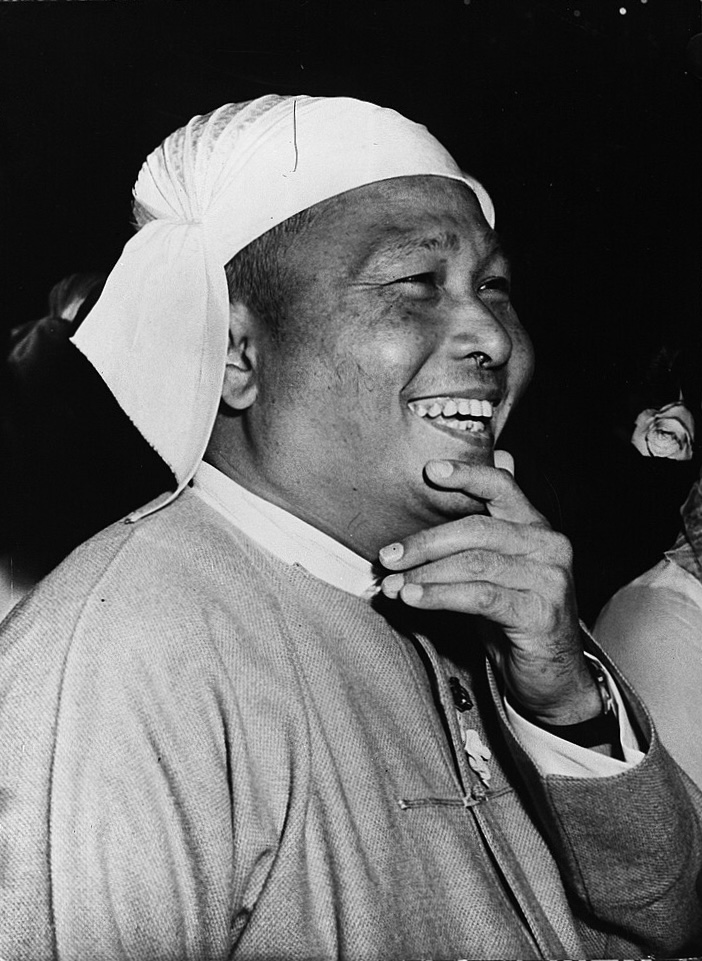
- U Nu in 1962

Prime Minister of Burma
- In office 4 April 1960 – 2 March 1962
- President: Win Maung
- Preceded by: Ne Win
- Succeeded by: Ne Win
- In office 28 February 1957 – 28 October 1958
- President: Ba U
- Preceded by: Ba Swe
- Succeeded by: Ne Win
- In office 4 January 1948 – 12 June 1956
- President: Sao Shwe Thaik; Ba U
- Preceded by: Office established Aung San as Premier of British Crown Colony of Burma
- Succeeded by: Ba Swe

Personal details
- Born: 25 May 1907 Wakema, Myaungmya District, Lower Burma, British India
- Died: 14 February 1995 (aged 87) Bahan Township, Yangon, Myanmar
- Party: Union Party (1958–1962/4); Parliamentary Democracy Party (1969–1973)
- Other political affiliations: AFPFL (until 1958)
- Spouse: Mya Yi (m. 1935; died 1993)
- Children: San San Nu; Thaung Htaik; Maung Aung; Than Than Nu; Khin Aye Nu
- Education: University of Rangoon
- Religion: Theravada Buddhism

Nu (Burmese: ဦးနု; pronounced [ʔú nṵ]; 25 May 1907 – 14 February 1995), commonly known as U Nu and also by the honorific name Thakin Nu, was a prominent Burmese statesman and the first Prime Minister of Union of Burma. He was educated at Rangoon University, where he developed his political ideas and became actively involved in the student movement. Nu's involvement in the nationalist movement deepened during his university years, and he quickly emerged as a leading figure advocating for Burma's independence from British colonial rule.

He played a crucial role in the Anti-Fascist People's Freedom League (AFPFL), the primary political organization leading the fight for independence. Following Burma's independence in 1948, Nu became the country's first Prime Minister under the provisions of the 1947 Constitution of the Union of Burma. His tenure was marked by efforts to rebuild the war-torn nation, establish democratic governance, and navigate the complexities of ethnic and political divisions within Burma. Nu's administration faced numerous challenges, including economic difficulties, internal insurgencies, and the task of unifying a diverse population.

During his time in office, Nu implemented several significant reforms, including land redistribution policies and initiatives to promote education and healthcare. He also pursued a policy of neutrality in foreign affairs, aligning Burma with neither the Western bloc nor the Soviet Union during the Cold War. However, his government struggled with internal dissent and regional insurgencies, leading to political instability.

Nu's first term as Prime Minister ended in 1958, but he briefly returned to power in 1960. However, his second tenure was cut short by a military coup in 1962, led by General Ne Win. Following the coup, Nu was placed under house arrest and later allowed to go into exile. He continued to be an influential political figure and an advocate for democracy until his death on 14 February 1995. Nu's legacy is remembered for his dedication to Burma's independence, his efforts to establish democratic governance, and his complex role in the nation's turbulent political history.

== Biography ==
Nu was born to U San Tun and Daw Saw Khin of Wakema, Myaungmya District, British Burma. He attended Myoma High School in Yangon, and received a B.A. from Rangoon University in 1929. In 1935 he married Mya Yi while studying for a Bachelor of Laws.

== Political career ==
=== Struggle for independence ===
Nu's political life started as president of the Rangoon University Students Union (RUSU) with M. A. Rashid as vice-president and U Thi Han as the general secretary. Aung San was editor and publicity officer. Nu and Aung San were both expelled from the university after an article, Hell Hound at Large, appeared in the union magazine, which was apparently about the rector. Their expulsion sparked off the second university students' strike in February 1936. Aung San and Nu became members of the nationalist Dobama Asiayone (Our Burma Association) which had been formed in 1930 and henceforth gained the prefix Thakin ('Master'), proclaiming they were the true masters of their own land. For a few years after independence in 1948 Nu retained the prefix 'Thakin', but around 1952 he announced that since Burma was already independent the prefix of 'Thakin' was no longer needed and henceforth he would be known as U ('Mr') Nu. In 1937 he co-founded with Thakin Than Tun the Nagani (Red Dragon) Book Club which for the first time widely circulated Burmese-language translations of the Marxist classics. He also became a leader and co-founder of the People's Revolutionary Party (PRP), which later became the Socialist Party, and the umbrella organisation, the Anti-Fascist People's Freedom League (AFPFL), which advocated Burmese independence from both Japanese and British control during the 1940s. He was detained by the colonial government in 1940 along with Thakin Soe, Thakin Than Tun, Kyaw Nyein, U Măd, and Ba Maw. The prison holding Nu was largely abandoned by the British in the course of the rapid Japanese advance.

From August 1943, when the Japanese declared nominal independence for Burma under a regime led by Ba Maw, Nu was appointed foreign minister. In 1944 he was appointed minister of information until the open rebellion by the AFPFL against the Japanese military in March 1945. Though aware of the resistance and in contact with its leaders, Nu did not actively participate in the underground activities of the AFPFL up to the rebellion, and unlike its leading figure Aung San, did not join the rebellion and move to areas under Allied control. Instead, Nu retreated with the Japanese and Ba Maw in late April 1945. Nu was nearly killed on 12 August 1945, when Allied pilots strafed and destroyed the house Ba Maw had been given by the retreating Japanese, but both escaped the residence during the attack. Following Japanese surrender, Nu retired from politics for a time, writing his memoirs of the war years, Burma Under the Japanese and tracts on Marxism. As a popular figure with early connections to Aung San and other nationalists from their student days, however, Nu was drawn back into the politics of the AFPFL where he initially struggled to keep its Communist contingent within the party.

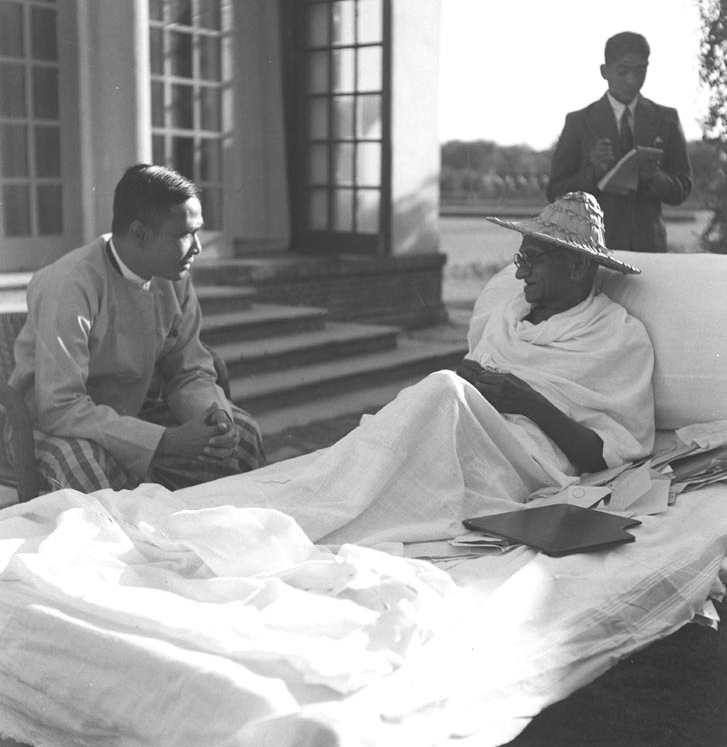
Mahatma Gandhi with Thakin Nu, Premier of Burma, at Birla House, Delhi, 4 December 1947

After the assassination of its political and military leader Aung San along with his cabinet ministers on 19 July 1947, U Nu led the AFPFL and signed an independence agreement (the Nu-Attlee Treaty) with the British Premier Clement Attlee in October 1947.

=== Parliamentary era ===
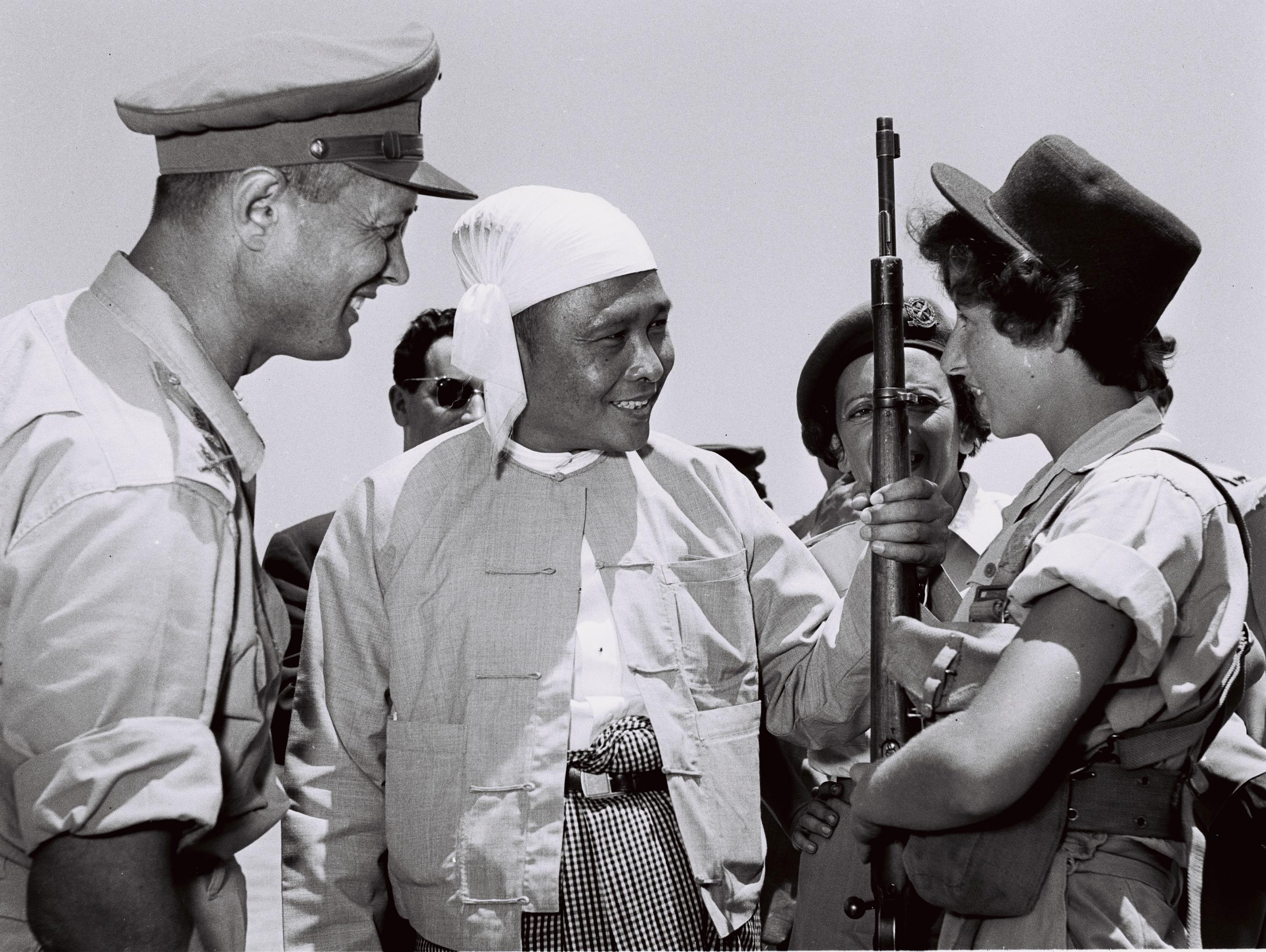
U Nu with Moshe Dayan during his visit to Israel in 1955

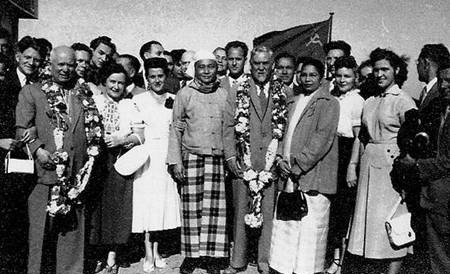
U Nu with Soviet leaders Nikita Khrushchev (far left with floral lei) and Nikolai Bulganin (right with floral lei) in Rangoon, December 1955

Burma gained independence from Britain on 4 January 1948. U Nu became the chairman of the Old Myoma Students Association in Yangon. He became the first Prime Minister of independent Burma, and had to deal with armed rebellion. The rebels included various ethnic groups, White Flag and Red Flag communist factions, and some regiments in the Army. Yet another challenge was the exiled Kuomintang (KMT). After being chased out of (Mainland) China by the victorious Communists, they had established bases in eastern Burma, and it took several years in the early 1950s to drive them out. A democratic system was instituted and parliamentary elections were held several times. Throughout the 1950s, U Nu oversaw the implementation of the Pyidawtha Plan, a national economic development plan to establish an industrial welfare state in Burma.

He voluntarily relinquished the Prime Ministerial position in 1956. He was one of the leaders of the Anti-Fascist People's Freedom League (AFPFL) from 1942 to 1963. AFPFL member Ba Swe served as prime minister from June 1956 to June 1957. In 1955, the University of Belgrade (Yugoslavia) awarded him an honorary doctorate.

On 26 September 1958, he asked the Army Chief of Staff General Ne Win to take over as a "caretaker government", and Ne Win was sworn in as prime minister on 27 October 1958. In the February 1960 general election, U Nu's Clean faction of the AFPFL won in a landslide victory over the Stable faction led by U Ba Swe and Kyaw Nyein. U Nu returned to power forming the Pyidaungzu (Union) government on 4 April 1960. The Clean AFPFL was subsequently renamed the Union Party.

U Thant had been Secretary to the Prime Minister U Nu before he was appointed Burmese Ambassador to the United Nations in 1957. U Thant became the third UN Secretary-General in 1961. U Nu participated in the 1st Summit of the Non-Aligned Movement in 1961 in Belgrade, making Burma one of the founding members of the Non-Aligned Movement.

In 1961, U Nu briefly made Buddhism the state religion and caused dissent amongst Christian Kachin nationalists, which became one of the main factors for the Kachin conflict.

=== Military era ===
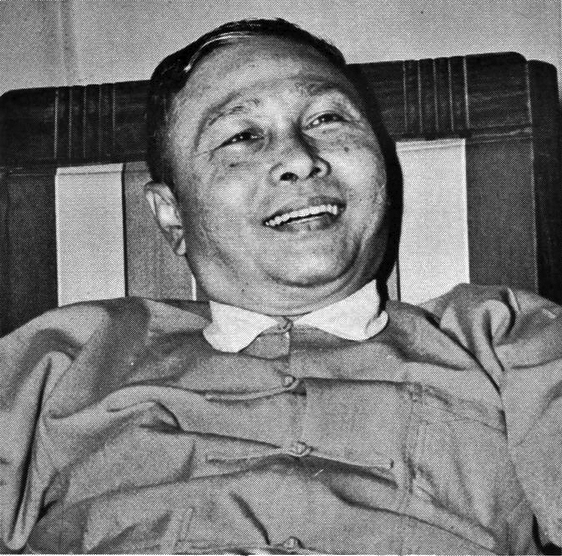
U Nu in January 1962, less than 2 weeks before the second military coup

Less than two years after his election victory, U Nu was overthrown in a coup d'état led by General Ne Win on 2 March 1962. After the 1962 coup, U Nu was put in what was euphemistically called 'protective custody' in an army camp outside Rangoon. He was released more than four years later on 27 October 1966. Among others, on the day of the military coup on 2 March 1962 President Mahn Win Maung as well as Chief Justice U Myint Thein (22 February 1900 – 3 October 1994) was also put in 'protective custody'. Win Maung was released from detention in October 1967 and Myint Thein not until 28 February 1968.

On 2 December 1968, Ne Win appointed U Nu to the 33-man Internal Unity Advisory Board to advise on suggestions for internal unity and political change. In February 1969, U Nu submitted a report recommending that power be handed back to him and that the Parliament abolished by Ne Win in March 1962 be reconvened to appoint Ne Win as president to remove the 'taint' of Ne Win's government being 'usurpers'. Soon after submitting his report, U Nu, feigning illness, and under the pretext of a pilgrimage to India left Burma for India. When Ne Win made no response to his report, U Nu left India for London.

In a London press conference on 27 August 1969, U Nu announced that he was the 'legal Prime Minister' and pledged that he would not give up his struggle for democracy in Burma and that Burma was under the 'same kind of fascism' that General Aung San had fought. In November 1969, Ne Win formally rejected U Nu's proposal, saying that he took over power – and held on to it – not because he craved power but to uplift the welfare of the 'workers and peasants' and that U Nu's proposals amounted to 'turning back the wheel'.

U Nu then used former Central Intelligence Agency (CIA) official Bill Young to help him raise international funding for founding the United National Liberation Front (UNLF). By the end of 1970, they had garnered more than $2 million.

U Nu later formed the Parliamentary Democracy Party (PDP) and led an armed resistance group. U Nu's 'resistance group' consisted of no more than several hundred or at most a few thousand at its peak and his avowal to fight and overthrow Ne Win from the Thai border met with abject failure. He subsequently accepted an offer of amnesty granted by Ne Win and returned to Burma on 29 July 1980.

=== 8888 Uprising ===
After keeping a low profile, teaching Buddhism in Burma and the United States – U Nu visited Northern Illinois University in the US to lecture on Buddhism in 1987 – U Nu became once again politically active during the 8888 Uprising forming the first new political party, the League for Democracy and Peace (LDP). Echoing his assertion that he was the 'legal Prime Minister' of August 1969 in London, U Nu reiterated on 9 September 1988 in Rangoon that he was still the 'legal Prime Minister'.

U Nu initiated to form an interim government and invited opposition leaders to join him. Indian Prime minister Rajiv Gandhi had already signaled his readiness to recognize the interim government and Burmese troops started to change sides with Burmese Navy almost totally siding with the opposition. However, Aung San Suu Kyi categorically rejected U Nu's plan by saying "the future of the opposition would be decided by masses of the people". Ex-Brigadier Aung Gyi, another opposition politician at the time of the 8888 crisis, followed and rejected the plan after Suu Kyi's refusal. Crucial months were passed on the street and the interim government was not internationally recognized due to lack of support from opposition. Political analyst Susanne Prager-Nyein described Aung San Suu Kyi's refusal as "a major strategic mistake".

Nonetheless U Nu formed his own 'government' reappointing Mahn Win Maung who was overthrown in the 1962 coup as 'President'. After the State Law and Order Restoration Council (SLORC) took over power on 18 September 1988, the SLORC repeatedly asked U Nu to formally 'abolish' his 'interim government', but U Nu refused to do so. As a result, Nu was put under house arrest on 29 December 1989. SLORC spokesmen at that time stated that although U Nu could have been tried for 'treason', due to his advanced age and his contribution to the freedom struggle, he was not charged with that offence. He was released on 23 April 1992 the same day the SLORC Chairman Senior General Saw Maung was forced to relinquish power and replaced by military junta (officially named the State Peace and Development Council) chief Senior General Than Shwe.

== Religious works ==
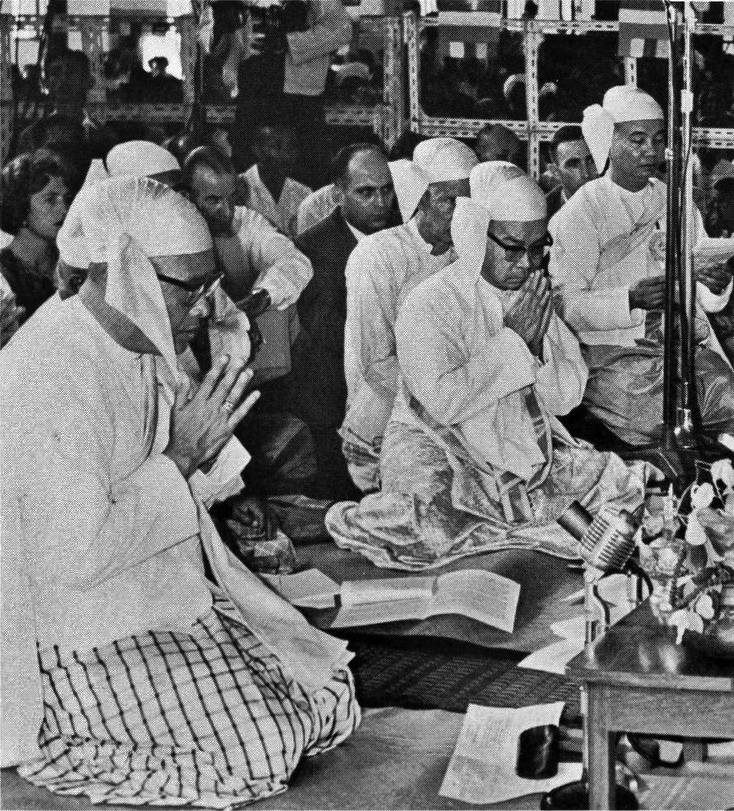
U Nu paying obeisance to the Buddha in 1961 ceremonies marking Vesak.

A devout Theravada Buddhist, U Nu had long been popular with the Buddhist majority of the country. In 1950, with the Karen Uprising, the Anti-Fascist People's Freedom League controlled Parliament launched a Peace Within One Year campaign, involving various military actions and governmental reforms. Amongst this backdrop, U Nu combined orders for military equipment from India with a request to receive Buddhist relics on loan. U Nu toured the relics around the country, reaching into the stable parts of the countryside where ethnic unrest was still present, hoping to inspire peace through the power of the Buddha.

He had the Kaba Aye Pagoda and the Maha Pasana Guha (Great Cave) built in 1952 in preparation for the Sixth Buddhist Synod that he convened and hosted in 1954–1956 as prime minister. In a 1957 interview with American news broadcast See It Now, he stated that:

Had it not been for my faith, I would have been finished in 1948, 1949, and 1950 when the insurrection was in its height.

He also stated that although he was born Buddhist, he was particularly attracted by the Kalama Sutta, a Buddhist doctrine that challenges believers to actively question their beliefs and views instead of passively accepting them:

You must not believe anything which you cannot test yourself.

On 29 August 1961, Parliament passed the State Religion Promotion Act of 1961, initiated by U Nu himself. This act made Buddhism the official state religion of the country, one of his election campaign promises as well as instated the Buddhist lunar calendar by official observance of the so-called Buddhist sabbath days, or Uposatha, in lieu of the Christian Sabbath day, Sunday. On Uposatha days, state broadcasting radio was required to dedicate its airtime to religious programs, while state schools and government offices were closed, and liquor was not allowed to be served in public spaces. The act also required government schools to teach Buddhist students the Buddhist scriptures, banned the slaughtering of cattle (beef became known as todo tha (Burmese: တိုးတိုးသား); lit. hush hush meat), and commuted death sentences for parolees.

Beyond stately actions, U Nu also took to fulfil the Buddhist ideal of the Chakravartin by engaging in personal merit-making and increasingly strong vows of celibacy to atone for the sins of the nation and to bring stability to his rule through religious devotion.

When General Ne Win took over in 1962, one of his first acts was to repeal the Buddhist acts that had passed under U Nu's administration, including the ban on cow slaughtering and declaration of Buddhism as the state religion, as they had alienated largely Christian ethnic minorities such as the Kachins and the Karens, and perhaps was symbolic of a personality clash between Nu and Ne Win.

== Literary works ==
U Nu authored several books some of which have been translated into English. Among his works are The People Win Through (1951), Burma under the Japanese (1954), An Asian Speaks (1955), and Burma Looks Ahead (1951). His autobiography (1907–1962) Ta-Tei Sanei Tha (Naughty Saturday-born) was published in India by Irrawaddy Publishing (U Maw Thiri) in 1975. An earlier version had been published in 1974; it was translated into English by U Law Yone, Editor of the (Rangoon) Nation till 1963 and who, like U Nu, was jailed by the Revolutionary Council in the 1960s. Before U Nu became prime minister, he had translated, in the late 1930s, Dale Carnegie's book, How to Win Friends and Influence People (Lupaw Luzaw Louknee in Burmese – in retranslation, it roughly meant 'How to Take Advantage of Man by Man'); later the translated name was changed to the more palatable 'Meikta Bala Htika' which can be retranslated as A Treatise on Friendly Social Contract. The translated work under the second title became a prescribed text in schools in the 1950s as was U Nu's original work in Burmese, The People Win Through or The Sound of the People Victorious (Ludu Aungthan). He organized a Burma Translation Society and first volume of Burmese Encyclopedia published in 1954. The Sarpay Beikhman continued those works.

=== Novelist and playwright ===
Besides serving as prime minister, U Nu was also an accomplished novelist and playwright. In a work from the colonial period titled Yesset pabeikwe or It's So Cruel (Man, the Wolf of Man) U Nu describes how during the colonial period rich landlords were able to get away with just about any crime they wished to perpetrate.

The play The Sound of the People Victorious (Ludu Aungthan) that U Nu wrote while he was prime minister is about the havoc that Communist ideologies can wreak in a family. Strangely enough the first production of the play seems to have been in Pasadena, California. It later became a popular comic book in Burma, was translated into English, and made into a feature film at the height of the Cold War in the 1950s. The older generation in Burma can still remember having studied the play in their schooldays.

In the play Thaka Ala, published just before the 1962 coup, U Nu paints an extremely ugly picture of corruption both amongst the high-ranking politicians in power at the time as well as among the communist leaders who were gaining ascendancy. This is a play in the vernacular, a genre that hardly exists in Burmese literature. A translation into English was published in instalments in the Guardian newspaper. The play was critical of the current state of politics in Burma at the time (around 1960) and in this critical stance it resembles Thein Pe Myint's The Modern Monk (Tet Hpongyi in Burmese). Like The Modern Monk, it deals with scandalous sexual liaisons not much in keeping with traditional modes of Burmese behaviour.One of the greatest female writers of the Post-colonial period is Journalgyaw Ma Ma Lay. Khin Myo Chit was another important writer, who wrote, among her works, The 13-Carat Diamond (1955), which was translated into many languages. The journalist Ludu U Hla was the author of numerous volumes of ethnic minority folklore, novels about inmates in U Nu-era jails, and biographies of people working in different occupations. The Prime Minister U Nu himself wrote several politically oriented plays and novels.

== Death ==
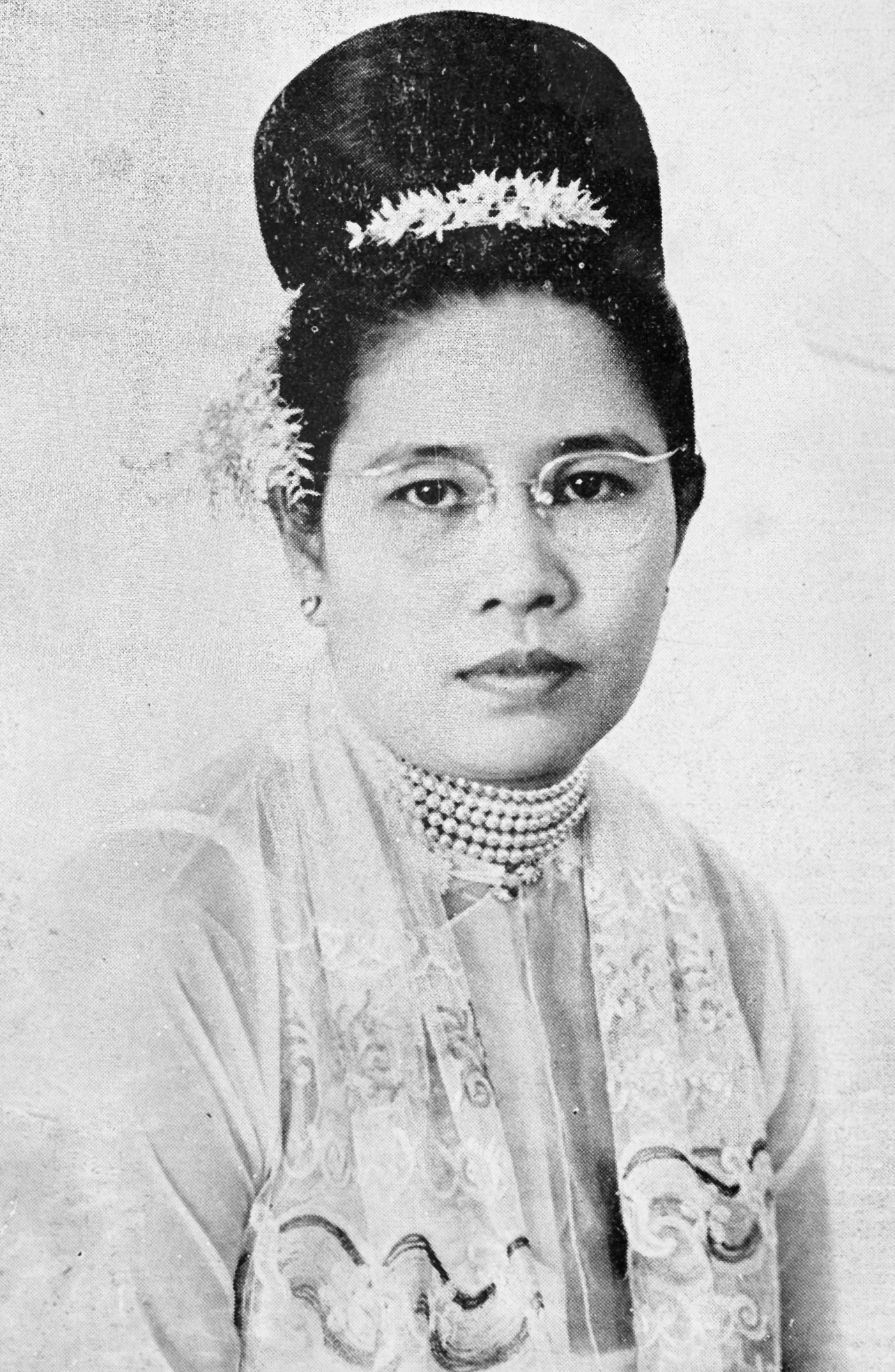
Mya Yi, ca. 1955.

Nu died of natural causes on 14 February 1995 at his home in Yangon's Bahan Township at the age of 87, after his wife Mya Yi (1910–1993) died. They had five children, San San (daughter), Thaung Htaik (son), Maung Aung (son), Than Than (daughter) and Cho Cho (daughter).

== See also ==
- History of Burma

Political offices
Preceded by office created	Prime Minister of Burma; 1948–1956	Succeeded by Ba Swe
Preceded by Ba Swe	Prime Minister of Burma; 1957–1958	Succeeded by Ne Win
Preceded by Ne Win	Prime Minister of Burma; 1960–1962	Succeeded by Ne Win
