= Prime Minister of Myanmar =

Head of government

Prime Minister of Republic of the Union of Myanmar
- ပြည်ထောင်စုသမ္မတမြန်မာနိုင်ငံတော် နိုင်ငံတော်ဝန်ကြီးချုပ်
- State Seal of Myanmar
- Style: His Excellency (formal)
- Type: Head of government
- Member of: Cabinet
- Reports to: SAC (2021–25); NDSC (2025–26)
- Seat: Nay Pyi Taw
- Appointer: SAC (2021–25) NDSC (2025–26)
- Term length: No fixed term
- Constituting instrument: SAC Order no. 152/2021; NDSC Order no. 2/2025
- Precursor: Premier of British Crown Colony of Burma
- Formation: 4 January 1948 (first); 1 August 2021 (second)
- First holder: U Nu
- Abolished: 30 March 2011 (first); 10 April 2026 (second)
- Deputy: Deputy Prime Minister

The Prime Minister (Burmese: နိုင်ငံတော်ဝန်ကြီးချုပ်, MLCTS: nuing ngam tau wan kri: khyup, lit. 'Chief Minister of the State') was the transitional head of government of Myanmar. There is no provision for the post in the 2008 Constitution of Myanmar, which names the president as the sole executive.

== History of the office ==
The position of prime minister was created in 1948, with the adoption of the Burmese Declaration of Independence from the United Kingdom. Since then, eleven people have held the office (with two of them doing so on multiple occasions). Due to the country's long period of military rule, it has not been uncommon for the prime minister to be a serving (or recently retired) military officer.

The actual power of the prime minister has considerably varied over time, differing based on who holds the office. In 2004, a power struggle between the then–head of state, Senior General Than Shwe, chairman of the State Peace and Development Council, and his prime minister, General Khin Nyunt, led to his dismissal and arrest.

The position was abolished on 30 March 2011, according to the current Constitution (adopted in 2008). It provided that the president is both the head of state and head of government. But after the 2015 general election, as Aung San Suu Kyi was constitutionally barred from becoming President, an office named State Counsellor, functionally identical to that of prime minister, was established for her on 6 April 2016.

On 1 August 2021, State Administration Council formed the caretaker government and chairman of SAC became prime minister.

On the night of 30 July 2025, Min Aung Hlaing celebrated a dinner as something tribute to his administration and cabinet. The next morning, he transferred his premiership to Nyo Saw through Order no. 2/2025 of the NDSC, citing NDSC authority under Section 427(b) of 2008 Constitution. On 10 April 2026, the office was abolished again following the inauguration of Min Aung Hlaing as president.

== Images ==
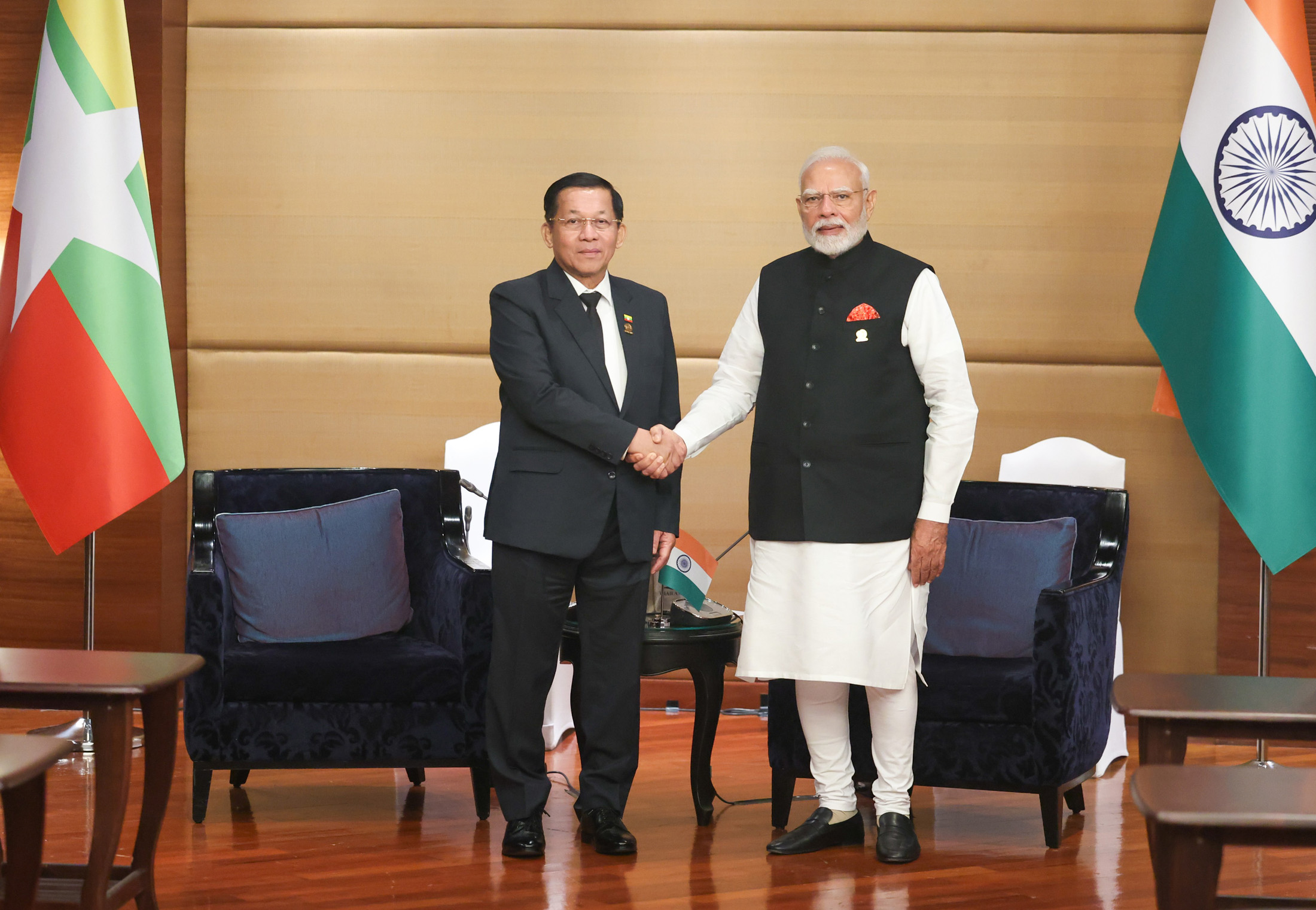
PM Narendra Modi meets the Senior General of the Republic of the Union of Myanmar, Mr. Min Aung Hlaing on the sidelines of the BIMSTEC Summit at Bangkok, in Thailand on April 03, 2025.

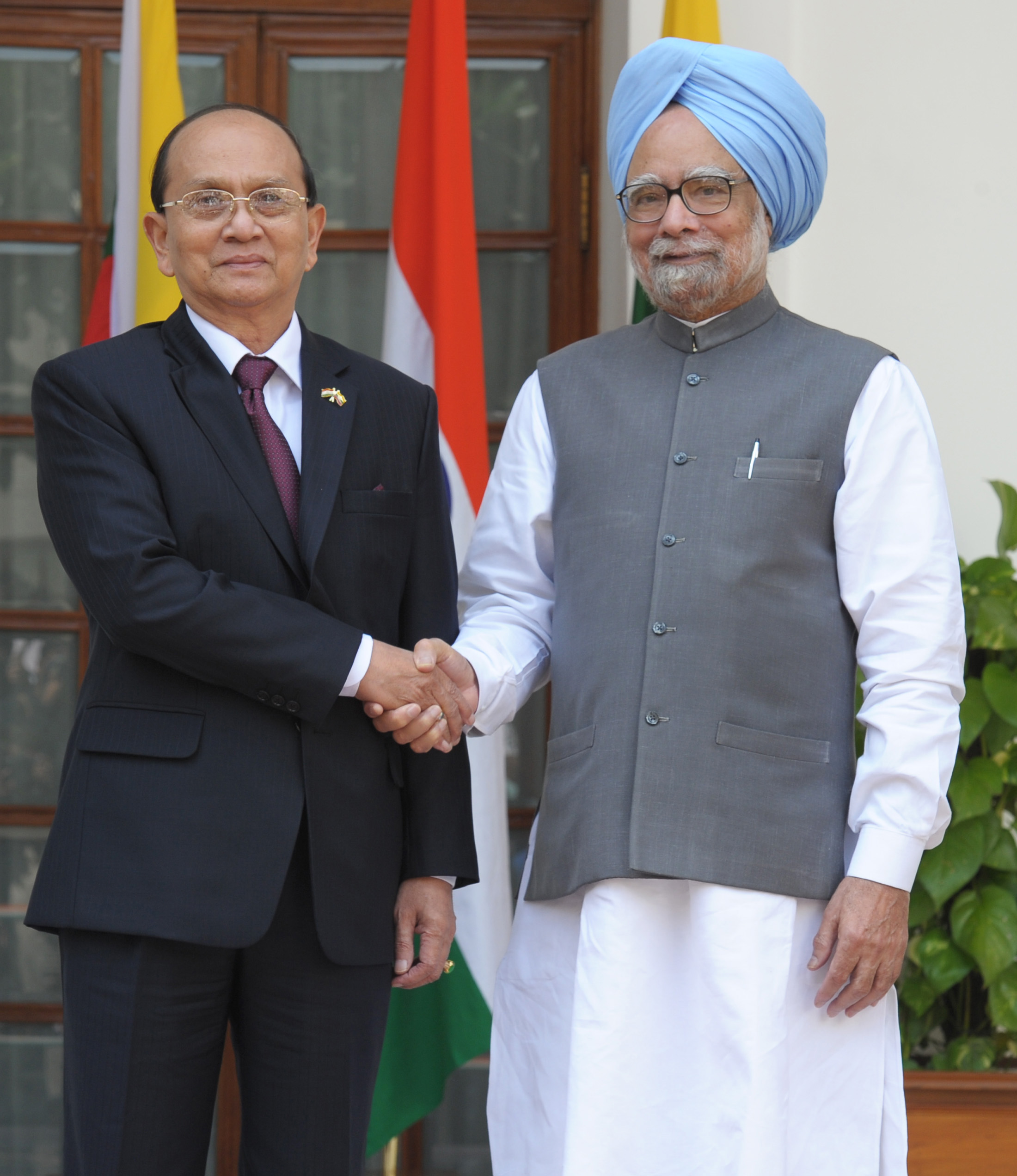
Thein Sein, the Prime Minister (later President) meeting Manmohan Singh, the Indian Prime Minister

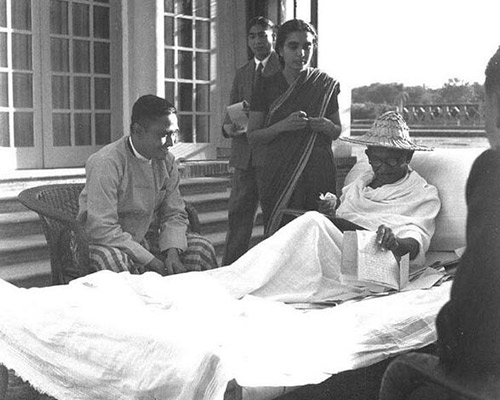
U Nu, the first ever person to hold the office meeting Mahatma Gandhi during his illness

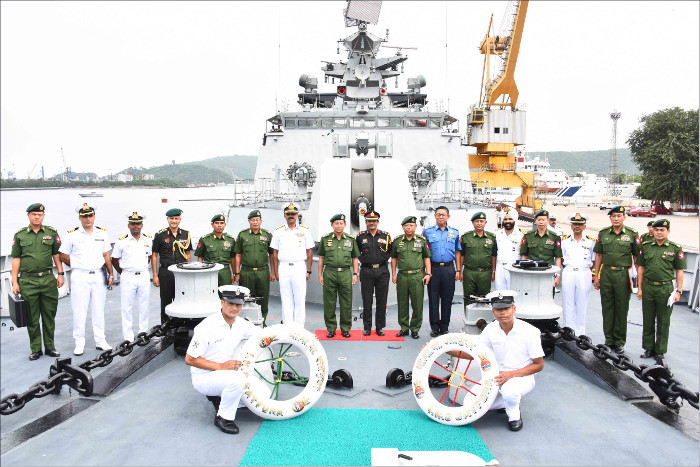
Incumbent Min Aung Hlaing and the Myanmar Armed Forces, accompanied by his wife Kyu Kyu Hla and a fifteen member high level delegation

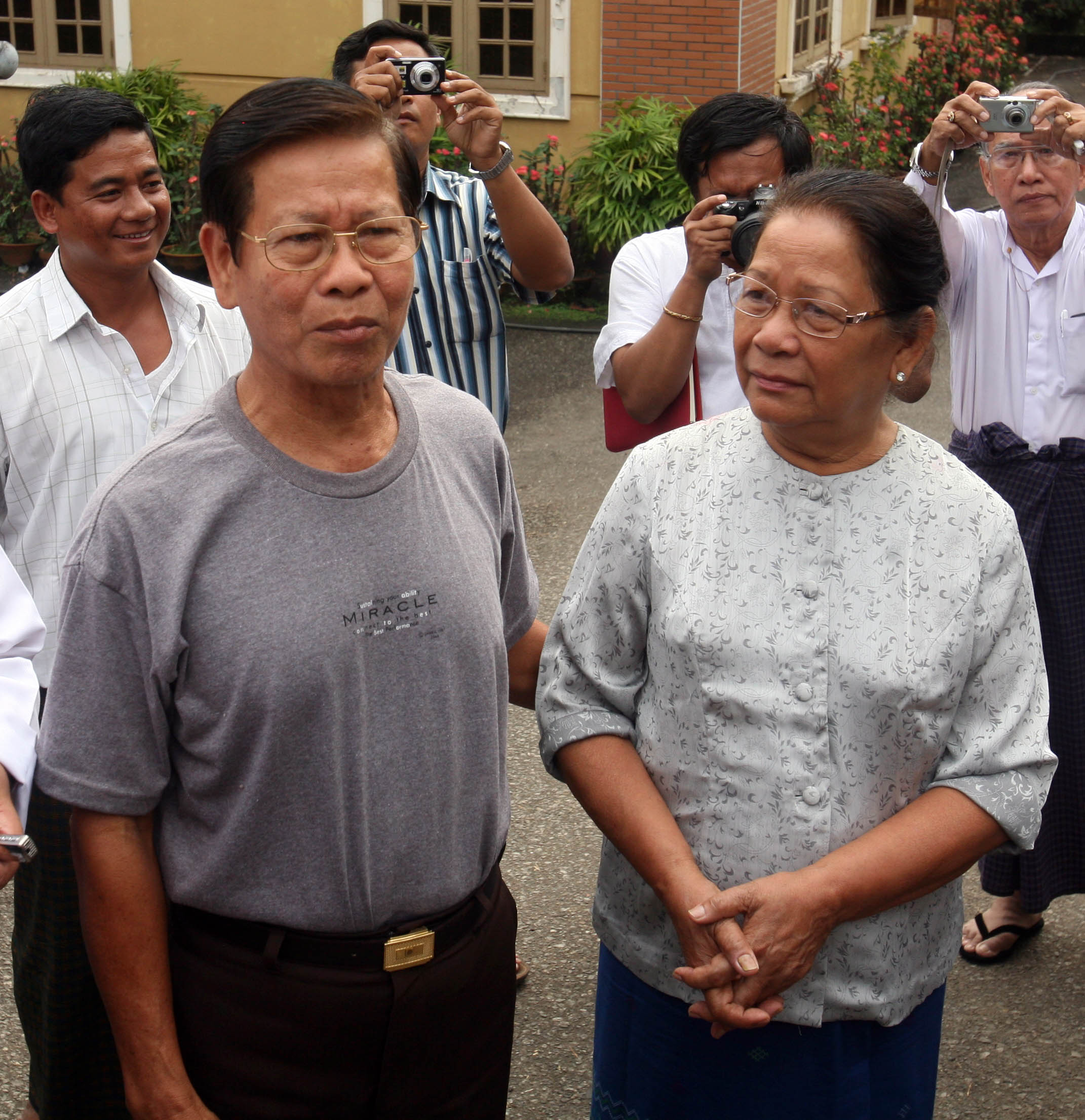
The interim Prime Minister Khin Nyunt after his release from house arrest

== See also ==
- List of colonial governors of Burma
- List of premiers of British Burma
- State Counsellor of Myanmar
- Vice President of Myanmar
