= List of political parties in Myanmar =

This is a list of political parties in Myanmar (Burma).

== Parties registered since 2023 ==
The State Administration Council enacted a new political party registration law on January 26, 2023, significantly increasing requirements for political parties. This law mandates parties to re-register within 60 days or face disbandment.

Key requirements for national parties include:

- Recruiting 100,000 members within 90 days of registration (a 100-fold increase from the previous law's 1,000 members), later an amendment of the law in 5 March 2024 reduced party membership requirement to 50,000 members.
- Establishing offices in at least half of Myanmar's 330 townships within six months.
- Depositing 100 million kyats with a state-owned bank.

Below is a list of political parties that have been approved by the Union Election Commission (UEC) under the new 2023 political parties registration law, and are thus eligible to compete in the 2025 general election.

Registered political parties in Myanmar
Serial No.	Political party name	Abbreviation	Registration Date / Serial No.	Announcement No.	Remarks
1	Union Solidarity and Development Party	USDP	20-4-2023 / Serial No. (1)	6/2023	
2	Myanmar People's Democratic Party	MPD	24-4-2023 / Serial No. (2)	7/2023	
3	New Democratic Party (Kachin)	NDP-Kachin	25-4-2023 / Serial No. (3)	8/2023	
4	Phalon-Sawaw Democratic Party	PSDP	25-4-2023 / Serial No. (4)	9/2023	
5	National Unity Party	NUP	25-4-2023 / Serial No. (5)	10/2023	
6	Arakan Front Party (AFP)	AFP	2-5-2023 / Serial No. (6)	11/2023	
7	Tai-Leng Nationalities Development Party (T.N.D.P)	TNDP	2-5-2023 / Serial No. (7)	12/2023	
8	Shan-Ni Solidarity Party (S.S.P)	SSP	2-5-2023 / Serial No. (8)	13/2023	
9	Rakhine State National Force Party	RSNFP	2-5-2023 / Serial No. (9)	14/2023	
10	Pa-O National Organization (PNO) Party	PNO	4-5-2023 / Serial No. (10)	15/2023	
11	Mro Nationalities Party	MNP	4-5-2023 / Serial No. (11)	16/2023	
12	Lisu National Development Party (L.N.D.P)	LNDP	5-5-2023 / Serial No. (12)	17/2023	
13	Khami National Development Party	KNDP	5-5-2023 / Serial No. (13)	18/2023	
14	Akha National Development Party	ANDP	8-5-2023 / Serial No. (14)	19/2023	
15	Inn National League Party	INLP	16-5-2023 / Serial No. (15)	20/2023	
16	Kokang Democracy and Unity Party (KKDUP)	KKDUP	16-5-2023 / Serial No. (16)	21/2023	
17	Karen National Democratic Party	KNDP	22-5-2023 / Serial No. (17)	22/2023	
18	Karen People's Party (KPP)	KPP	22-5-2023 / Serial No. (18)	23/2023	
19	Shan State Kokang Democratic Party	SSKDP	30-5-2023 / Serial No. (19)	24/2023	
20	Naga National Party (NNP)	NNP	30-5-2023 / Serial No. (20)	25/2023	
21	Danu National Democracy Party	DNDP	5-6-2023 / Serial No. (21)	26/2023	
22	People's Pioneer Party	PPP	5-6-2023 / Serial No. (22)	27/2023	
23	Democratic Party of National Politics (DNP)	DNP	9-6-2023 / Serial No. (23)	28/2023	Dissolved
24	National Political Alliances League Party	NPALP	9-6-2023 / Serial No. (24)	29/2023	
25	Federal Democratic Party	FDP	9-6-2023 / Serial No. (25)	30/2023	
26	People's Labour Party	PLP	21-6-2023 / Serial No. (26)	31/2023	
27	Myanmar Farmers' Development Party	MFDP	21-6-2023 / Serial No. (27)	32/2023	
28	Shan and Nationalities Democratic Party (White Tiger Party)	SNDP	23-6-2023 / Serial No. (28)	33/2023	
29	Democratic Party	DP	23-6-2023 / Serial No. (29)	34/2023	
30	Democratic Force Labour Party	DFLP	23-6-2023 / Serial No. (30)	35/2023	
31	Women's Party (Mon)	WP-Mon	23-6-2023 / Serial No. (31)	36/2023	Dissolved
32	Mro National Development Party	MNDP	3-7-2023 / Serial No. (32)	37/2023	
33	New National Democracy Party	NNDP	14-7-2023 / Serial No. (33)	38/2023	
34	National Interest Development Party (NIDP)	NIDP	14-7-2023 / Serial No. (34)	39/2023	
35	"Wa" National Party	WNP	27-7-2023 / Serial No. (35)	40/2023	
36	Khumi National Party	KNP	11-8-2023 / Serial No. (36)	41/2023	
37	National Political New Spirit Party	NPNSP	15-9-2023 / Serial No. (37)	42/2023	
38	United Nationalities Democracy Party	UNDP	7-11-2023 / Serial No. (38)	43/2023	
39	Union Peace and Unity Party	UPUP	7-11-2023 / Serial No. (39)	44/2023	
40	Myanmar Farmers' and Workers' People's Party	MFWPP	13-11-2023 / Serial No. (40)	45/2023	
41	Modern People Party	MPP	20-11-2023 / Serial No. (41)	46/2023	
42	Labour Party	Labour	20-11-2023 / Serial No. (42)	47/2023	
43	National Democratic Force Party (NDF)	NDF	23-11-2023 / Serial No. (43)	50/2023	Dissolved
44	The 88 Generation Student Youths (Union of Myanmar) Party		29-11-2023 / Serial No. (44)	51/2023	
45	The Union of Myanmar Federation of National Politics Party	UMFNPP	29-11-2023 / Serial No. (45)	52/2023	
46	The Party for People	PFP	21-12-2023 / Serial No. (46)	53/2023	
47	People's Party	PP	29-12-2023 / Serial No. (47)	54/2023	
48	Mon Progressive Party	MPP	1-4-2024 / Serial No. (48)	1/2024	
49	Peace Facilitation Party	PFP	25-4-2024 / Serial No. (49)	2/2024	
50	Diversity and Peace Party	DPP	15-7-2024 / Serial No. (50)	3/2024	
51	Kachin State People's Party (KSPP)	KSPP	19-8-2024 / Serial No. (51)	4/2024	
52	Mon Unity Party	MUP	9-9-2024 / Serial No. (52)	5/2024	
53	Union Farmers and Workers Force Party	UFWFP	12-11-2024 / Serial No. (53)	6/2024	
54	Social and Economic Advancement Party	SEAP	18-11-2024 / Serial No. (54)	7/2024	
55	Unity and Development Party (UADP)	UDP	2-12-2024 / Serial No. (55)	8/2024	
56	Kayah State People's Party (KySPP)	KySPP	20-2-2025 / Serial No. (56)	1/2025	
57	New Chinland Congress Party (NCC)	NCC	10-7-2025 / Serial No. (57)	2/2025	
58	Rakhine Nationalities Party		4-8-2025 / Serial No. (58)	41/2025	
59	Zomi National Party		7-8-2025 / Serial No. (59)	42/2025	
60	Pa-O National Unity Party		8-8-2025 / Serial No. (60)	47/2025	

== Parties represented in the 2016–2021 Assembly of the Union ==
Party	Abbr.	Seats on the State Administration Council	Seats in Local Hluttaws	Position
National League for Democracy (banned since 2023) အမျိုးသား ဒီမိုကရေစီ အဖွဲ့ချုပ်	NLD	0 / 18	476 / 879	Centrist; Liberalism
Union Solidarity and Development Party ပြည်ထောင်စုကြံ့ခိုင်ရေးနှင့် ဖွံ့ဖြိုးရေးပါတီ	USDP	4 / 18	73 / 879	Far-right; Buddhist nationalism Conservatism
Arakan National Party ရခိုင်အမျိုးသားပါတီ	ANP	0 / 18	22 / 879	Far-right; Rakhine nationalism
Shan Nationalities League for Democracy ရှမ်းတိုင်းရင်းသားများ ဒီမိုကရေစီအဖွဲ့ချုပ်	SNLD	0 / 18	25 / 879	Centre-left; Shan interests
Ta'ang National Party တအာင်းအမျိုးသားပါတီ	TNP	0 / 18	7 / 879	Palaung interests
Zomi Congress for Democracy ဇိုမီး ဒီမိုကရေစီအဖွဲ့ချုပ်	ZCD	0 / 18	2 / 879	Zomi interests
Mon National Party မွန်အမျိုးသားပါတီ	MNP	0 / 18	2 / 879	Mon nationalism
National Unity Party တိုင်းရင်းသားစည်းလုံးညီညွတ်ရေးပါတီ	NUP	0 / 18	0 / 879	Centre-left; Federalism; Nationalism; Populism
Pa-O National Organisation ပအိုဝ်း အမျိုးသား အဖွဲ့ချုပ်	PNO	0 / 18	6 / 879	Pa'O interests
Lisu National Development Party လီဆူးအမျိုးသားဖွံ့ဖြိုးရေးပါတီ	LNDP	0 / 18	2 / 879	Lisu interests
Kachin State Democracy Party ကချင်ပြည်နယ်ဒီမိုကရေစီပါတီ	KSDP	0 / 18	3 / 879	Kachin interests
Kokang Democracy and Unity Party ကိုးကန့် ဒီမိုကရေစီနှင့် ညီညွတ်ရေးပါတီ 果敢民主团结党	KDUP	0 / 18	1 / 879	Kokang nationalism Anti-communism; Right-wing
Wa Democratic Party ‘ဝ’ ဒီမိုကရက်တစ်ပါတီ	WDP	0 / 18	2 / 879	Centrist; Wa interests
All Mon Region Democracy Party မွန်ဒေသလုံးဆိုင်ရာ ဒီမိုကရေစီပါတီ	AMRDP	0 / 18	1 / 879	Mon interests
Democratic Party ဒီမိုကရက်တစ်ပါတီ	DP	0 / 18	1 / 879	Liberal democracy
Kayin People's Party ကရင်ပြည်သူ့ပါတီ	KPP	1 / 18	1 / 879	Karen interests
La Hu National Development Party လားဟူ အမျိုးသား ဖွံ့ဖြိုးတိုးတက်ရေး ပါတီ	LHNDP	0 / 18	1 / 879	Lahu interests
Shan Nationalities Democratic Party ရှမ်းတိုင်းရင်းသားများ ဒီမိုကရက်တစ်ပါတီ	SNDP	0 / 18	1 / 879	Shan interests Centre-right
Tai-Leng Nationalities Development Party တိုင်းလိုင်(ရှမ်းနီ)အမျိုးသားများ ဖွံ့ဖြိုးတိုးတက်ရေးပါတီ	TNDP	0 / 18	1 / 879	Shan-Ni Interests
Unity and Democracy Party of Kachin State စည်းလုံးညီညွတ်ရေးနှင့် ဒီမိုကရေစီပါတီ ကချင်ပြည်နယ်	UDPKS	0 / 18	1 / 879	Kachin interests Centre-right
Wa National Unity Party ဝ အမျိုးသား စည်းလုံးညီညွတ်ရေးပါတီ	WNUP	0 / 18	1 / 879	Wa interests
Military တပ်မတော်	—	9 / 18	216 / 879	Militarist
Independents	—	0 / 18	1 / 879	
Vacant	—	0	14	

== Unrepresented parties ==
- Arakan Liberation Party
- Arakan National Council
- Chin National Front
- Chin National Party
- Chin Progressive Party
- Communist Party of Burma (banned)
- Confederate Farmers Party
- Dawei Nationalities Party
- Democracy and Human Rights Party
- Democracy and Peace Party
- Democratic Party for a New Society
- Ethnic National Development Party
- Federal Union Party
- Inn National Development Party
- Kachin Independence Organization (banned)
- Karen National Party
- Karen National Union
- Karenni National Progressive Party
- Kaman National Progressive Party
- Khami National Development Party
- Lahu Democratic Union
- Modern People's Party
- Mro National Party
- Mro National Solidarity Organisation
- Myanmar Farmers Development Party
- Myanmar National Truth and Justice Party
- National Democratic Force
- National Democratic Party for Development
- National Development Party
- National Development and Peace Party
- New Mon State Party
- Palaung State Liberation Front
- Peace and Diversity Party
- Phalon-Sawaw Democratic Party
- People's Party of Myanmar Farmers and Workers
- Regional Development Party of Pyay
- Restoration Council of Shan State
- Shan State Progress Party
- Union Democratic Party
- United Democratic Party of Myanmar
- United Kayin League
- United Wa State Party
- Wunthanu National League for Democracy

== Defunct parties ==
- 21 Party
- All-Shan State Organisation
- Anti-Fascist Organisation
- Anti-Fascist People's Freedom League
- Anti-Separation League
- Arakan League for Democracy
- Arakanese Muslim Association
- Arakanese National Unity Organisation
- Burma Democratic Party
- Burma for the Burmans League
- Burma Muslim Congress
- Burma Nationalist Party
- Burma Socialist Party
- Burma Socialist Programme Party
- Burma Workers Party
- Chin Hills Congress
- Chin National Organisation
- Democracy Party
- Democratic Organisation for Kayan National Unity
- Freedom Bloc
- General Council of Burmese Associations
- Graduates and Old Students Democratic Association
- Hlaing-Myat-Paw GCBA
- Home Rule Party
- Independent Arakanese Parliamentary Group
- Independent Party
- Justice Party
- Kachin National Congress
- Kamans National League for Democracy
- Karen National Association
- Karen State National Organisation
- Kayah Democratic League
- Kayah National United League
- Kayah State Nationalities League for Democracy
- Kuomintang in Burma
- Mara People's Party
- Mon National Front
- Naga Hills Regional Progressive Party
- National Parliamentary Organisation
- National United Front
- Nationalist Party
- Party for National Democracy
- Patriot's Party
- Patriotic Alliance
- Patriotic Old Comrades' League
- People's Democratic Front
- People's Educational and Cultural Development Organisation
- People's Party
- People's Peace Front
- Poor Man's Party
- Rakhine Nationalities Development Party
- Separation League
- Shan State Peasants' Organisation
- Swaraj Party
- Ta'ang National League for Democracy
- Thakins
- Union Danu League for Democracy Party
- Union Karen League
- Union National Democracy Party
- Union Party
- United GCBA
- United Hill People's Congress
- United National Pa-O Organisation
- United Nationalities League for Democracy

== Political alliances ==
- Federal Democracy Alliance
- Nationalities Brotherhood Federation
- United Nationalities Alliance
- United Political Parties Alliance

== Political organisations ==
- 88 Generation Students Group
- Myanmar Democracy Congress
- National Political Alliances League
- Union of Myanmar Federation of National Politics
- United Nationalities Federal Council
- Union Solidarity and Development Association

== Governments in exile ==
- National Coalition Government of the Union of Burma
- National Council of the Union of Burma
- National Unity Government of Myanmar

== See also ==
- Assembly of the Union
- Elections in Myanmar
