= United Nationalities League for Democracy =

The United Nationalities League for Democracy (Burmese: ပြည်ထောင်စု တိုင်းရင်းသားလူမျိုးများ ဒီမိုကရေစီအဖွဲ့ချုပ်; UNLD) was a political alliance in Myanmar.

== History ==
Following the reintroduction of multi-party democracy after the 8888 Uprising, the UNLD was formed in 1988 as an alliance of 25 ethnic-based parties, including:

- Arakan League for Democracy
- Arakan People's United Organisation
- Arakanese Peace and Human Rights Party
- Chin National League for Democracy
- Democratic League for the National Races of Shan State
- Democratic Organisation for Kayan National Unity
- Highlander's Democratic Party
- Kachin National Congress
- Kamans National League for Democracy
- Karen State National Organisation
- Kayah State Nationalities League for Democracy
- Lahu National Development Party
- Mon National Democratic Front
- Mro or Khami National Solidarity Organisation
- Shan Nationalities League for Democracy
- Shan State Kachin Democratic Party
- Union Karen League
- Pa-O National Organisation
- Ta'ang National League for Democracy
- Zomi National Congress

The alliance aligned itself with the National League for Democracy in 1990. It contested 247 seats in the 1990 general elections. Under the UNLD banner it received 0.07% of the vote, winning one seat; U Htaung Kho Htan (a member of the Hill Tribe Democratic Party) in Tamu. In total UNLD member won 67 seats.

The alliance was dissolved by the military government in 1992.
