= Greater Burma Party =

Burmese political party 1944-1962

- Leader: Ba Maw
- Founded: 1944
- Dissolved: 1962
- Preceded by: Freedom Bloc
- Ideology: Burmese independence Anti–British imperialism Pro–Japanese imperialism (1944-1945); Fascism (until 1945); Left-wing nationalism (After 1951)

The Greater Burma Party, also known as Mahabama Party, was a political party in Burma during World War II and the Union of Burma (1948–1962).

== History ==
The Greater Burma Party was established by the Freedom Bloc in 1944 as state party along fascist lines. The party was led by Ba Maw, who had cooperated with the Japanese occupation of Burma and was president and Prime Minister of the Japanese puppet regime.

The party disintegrated in 1945, when the British Empire re-conquered Burma, with the help of the Anti-Fascist Organisation. Ba Maw fled to Japan, where he was arrested during the occupation of Japan in 1946.

Ba Maw returned to Burma in 1947 and re-organised the party in opposition to the continued British colonial rule. The party was not invited to join the talks about Burmese independence held in London.

The Greater Burma party allied with the Patriot's Party of U Saw and the wing of the Communist Party of Burma led by Thakin Ba Hein to boycott the 1947 Burmese general election which would draft the constitution for the Union of Burma.

The party joined the Patriotic Alliance with the Union of Burma League of U Ba Pe which in turn joined the People's Democratic Front of the Burma Workers and Peasants Party and the People's Peace Front for the 1951–52 Burmese general election.

During the 1950s the day-to-day organisation of political activities fell to Burma Independence Army veteran Bo Yan Naing, son-in-law of party leader Ba Maw. In the 1956 Burmese general election the Greater Burma Party joined other opposition parties to form the All Opposition Alliance coalition, but ideological and personal differences lead to the breakup of the coalition. The party ran as part of the Burma Nationalist Bloc, but won only one seat in the election, which was later vacated by the election tribunal.

The party vanished in the aftermath of the 1962 Burmese coup d'état. Party members joined Bo Yan Naing as part of the resistance against the military dictatorship.
