= Sultan Ahmed (Burmese politician) =

Burmese politician (1901–1981)

Member of the Constituent Assembly of Burma from Maungdaw
- In office 1947–1948

Member of the Union Parliament from Maungdaw
- In office 1951–1962

Parliamentary Secretary to the Ministry of Minorities
- In office 1956–1960

Personal details
- Born: 1901 Thay Chaung, Arakan Division, Burma Province, British India
- Died: 2 March 1981 (aged 79–80) Chittagong, Bangladesh
- Party: Jamiat e Ulema
- Other political affiliations: Anti-Fascist People's Freedom League
- Spouse: Aye Nyunt (Zura Begum)
- Education: Bachelor degree from Calcutta, Bachelor of Law from Rangoon University

Sultan Ahmed (1901 – 2 March 1981) was one of the longest serving legislators from Arakan, Burma (now Rakhine State, Myanmar). Ahmed was the president of the Jamiat-e-Ulema party, which was allied with the Anti-Fascist People's Freedom League, the founding political party of Burma. Ahmed served in the Burmese parliament until the 1962 Burmese coup d'état.

== Early life ==
Sultan Ahmed was born in 1901 at Thay Chaung Village (Balukhali, Malavi Para) of Maungdaw (in Northern Arakan), Burma. His father was Maulana Akram Uddin. He was matriculated in 1919 from Government Muslim High School of Chittagong. He graduated with B.A degree from University of Calcutta in 1924. In 1929, he obtained his Bachelor of Law degree from the Rangoon University.

== Law career ==
From 1930, after enrolling as Higher-Grade Pleader, Ahmed practiced law in both Rangoon and Akyab. He was appointed as Assistant Township Officer (ATO) in 1946 at Maungdaw there he served till 1946. Later he joined the Judicial Department and became First Class Magistrate under the British Government.

== Political career ==
=== British Burma ===
Ahmed was elected to the Legislature of Burma in British Burma in 1947 as a representative of Maungdaw constituency. Ahmed was one of the two Rohingyas in the Burmese legislature in 1947, along with M. A. Gaffar.

=== Union of Burma ===
After Burmese independence in 1948, Ahmed became a member of the Burmese constituent assembly. During the 1951 Burmese general election, he was elected to the Union Parliament from Maungdaw-1 constituency. He was re-elected in 1956 and 1960. Ahmed was appointed Parliamentary Secretary to the Ministry of Minorities, with the rank and status of a Deputy Minister. He was one of the longest-serving Parliamentary Secretaries in Burmese history.

==== Statehood question ====
Sultan Ahmed, along with Kyaw Yin, San Tun Aung, Tha Tun, was a member of the Arakan sub-committee of the Justice Sir Ba Oo Commission. The commission, headed by the Chief Justice of Burma, was set up by Prime Minister U Nu to explore the prospects for Arakanese statehood. The committee submitted its report on 29 October 1948. It recommended the creation of a Ministry of Arakan Affairs which was to be assisted by an Arakan Affairs Council, both of which would be constitutionally recognized.

== See also ==
- Rohingya people
- Zurah Begum
