= Bo Hmu Aung =

Burmese politician (1910–2004)

- ဗိုလ်မှူးအောင်
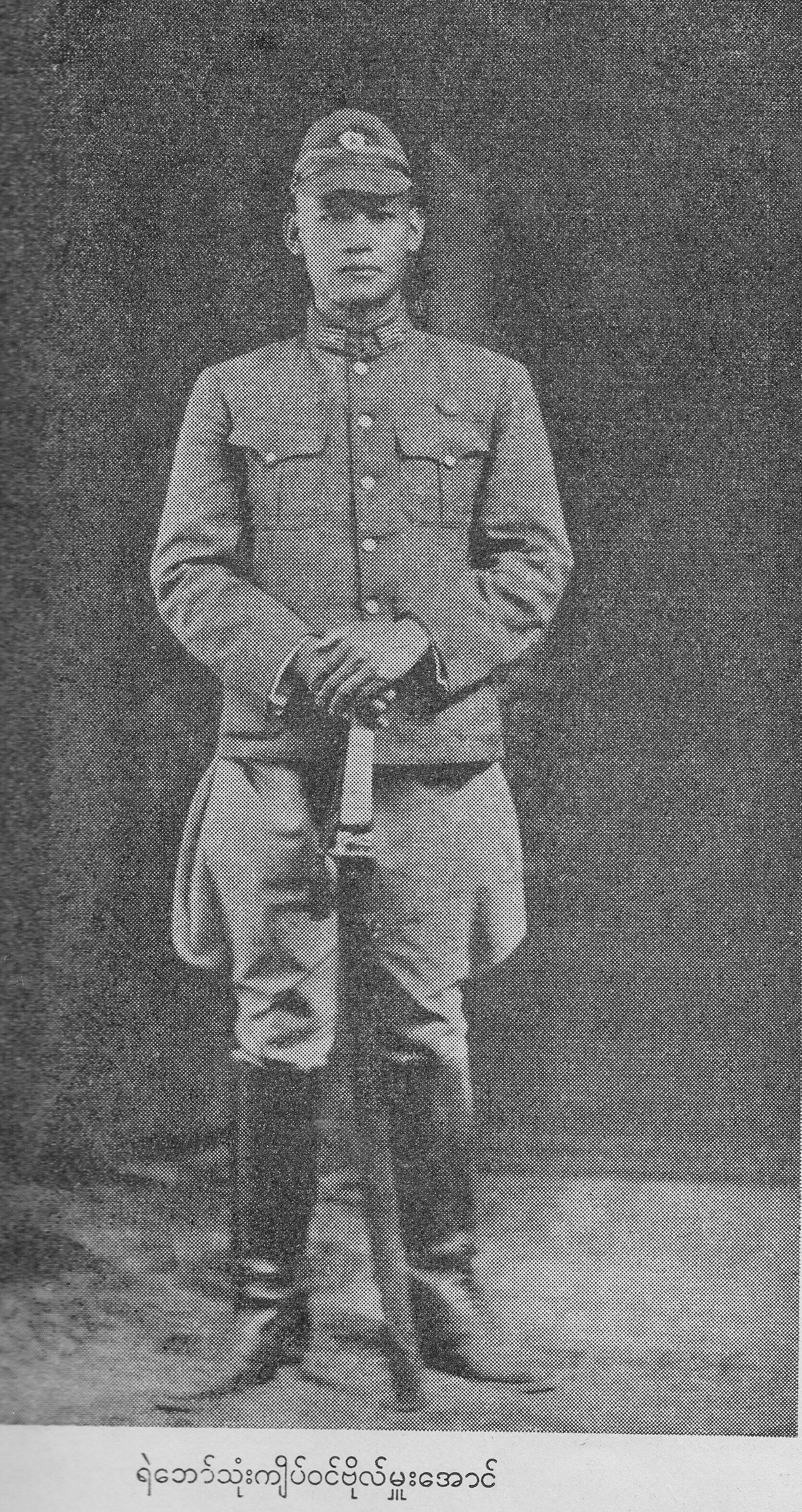
- Hmu Aung in the 1930s

Speaker of the Chamber of Deputies

Personal details
- Born: San Hlaing (စံလှိုင်) Omura Tabashi; 30 August 1910 Kyauktaga, Pegu Province, British Burma
- Died: 9 November 2004 (aged 94) Yangon, Myanmar
- Parent(s): Shwe Hman (father); Phaw (mother)
- Known for: Member of the Thirty Comrades
- Awards: Independence Mawgunwin (First Class)

Military service
- Allegiance: Burma Independence Army

Bo Hmu Aung (Burmese: ဗိုလ်မှူးအောင်, 30 August 1910 – 9 November 2004) was a Burmese military officer and a member of the legendary Thirty Comrades who trained in Japan in the struggle for independence from Britain and regarded as one of the founders of the Tatmadaw (the modern-day Myanmar Armed Forces). He also served as Speaker of the Chamber of Deputies, was the lower house of the bicameral Union Parliament of independence Burma (now Myanmar).

== Early life ==
Bo Hmu Aung was born on 30 August 1910 in Kyauktaga, Pegu Province, British Burma (now Myanmar).

== Struggle for independence ==
=== Freedom fighter ===
He joined Dobama Asiayone in 1930. In 1940, he smuggled out of Burma with Aung San and 28 others to receive military training to fight the British colonial government and founded Burma Independence Army (BIA). When Burma's resistance to Japanese occupation was launched on 27 March 1945, Bo Hmu Aung commanded Zone 7, one of the hottest area of war. His subordinate officers during Burmese revolution against Japanese occupation of Burma were Bo Sein Hman (who later died in action as Special Commissioner) and Bo Aung Gyi.

=== Panglong Conference ===
In 1947, Bo Hmu Aung acted as one of the negotiators of the historical Panglong Conference negotiated with Bamar representative General Aung San and other ethnic leaders. All these leaders unanimously decided to join the Union of Burma. On the agenda was the united struggle for independence from Britain and the future of Burma after independence as a unified republic. The signing is now celebrated as a public holiday, Union Day, in Myanmar.

== Political career ==
After independence, Bo Hmu Aung served as a member of parliament, Speaker of the Chamber of Deputies, and a minister in various ministries, such as transport and communication, housing and resettlement and defense. He was detained and put under house arrest many times after the military coup in 1962. Released in 1967, he joined U Nu's insurgent PDP in Thailand, but returned to Rangoon after the 1980 amnesty.

After the 8888 Uprising he formed, with U Nu, the League for Democracy and Peace and signed several public appeals urging the ruling junta to negotiate with the National League for Democracy after its win in the 1990 parliamentary elections.

== Death ==
He died on 9 November 2004 at his residence in Rangoon.
