= Aye Nyunt =

Burmese politician (1919–1990)

Daw Aye Nyunt MP
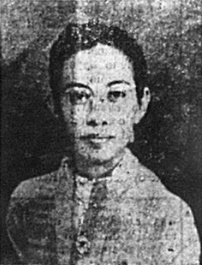
- Aye Nyunt in 1951

Member of the Union Parliament
- In office 1951–1956
- Succeeded by: Abul Khair
- Constituency: Maungdaw South

Personal details
- Born: 10 April 1919 Akyab, Arakan, Burma
- Died: 1990 (aged 70–71) Yangon, Myanmar
- Party: Anti-Fascist People's Freedom League
- Spouse: Sultan Ahmed
- Parent: U Po Khine (father)
- Education: Akyab Government High School; St. Anne's Convent (Akyab)

Aye Nyunt (10 April 1919 – 1990), also known by her Islamic name Zura Begum, was a Burmese politician from Akyab, Arakan, now Sittwe, Rakhine State. She was one of two women elected to the Union Parliament in the country's first post-independence election in 1951. An ethnic Rohingya, she was the first woman member of parliament (MP) from Arakan and represented the constituency of Maungdaw South from 1951 to 1956. Her father U Po Khine and husband Sultan Ahmed also served as MPs in the Union Parliament, representing Akyab North and Maungdaw North, respectively.

== Early life ==
Daw Aye Nyunt, or Zura Begum, was born on 10 April 1919 in Rupah Quarter, Akyab, Arakan, to Rohingya parents U Po Khine (also spelled U Poe Khaine; Islamic name Nasir Uddin) and Daw Ma Ma. U Po Khine was a high profile community leader and served as the President of the All Burma Muslim Congress.

She completed her elementary school education at St. Anne's Convent in Akyab. She attended Akyab Government High School and passed the university entrance exam in 1937. She then studied pre-medicine at a medical school before losing interest and transferring to a teacher's college some time between 1938 and 1939.

== Political career ==
The newly independent Union of Burma held its first parliamentary election in 1951–52. Daw Aye Nyunt was elected in the constituency of Maungdaw South, winning a little over three-quarters of the vote. She was one of two women elected, the other being Khin Kyi, the mother of future democracy leader and state counsellor Daw Aung San Suu Kyi. Daw Aye Nyunt's father was elected as the MP for Akyab North. Her husband Sultan Ahmed, then the President of Jamiat-ul-Ulaema, was elected as the MP for Maungdaw North and served as a parliamentary secretary during his tenure.

On 12 December 1951, Burma's first president Sao Shwe Thaik held a dinner party in Akyab, which Daw Aye Nyunt attended with her husband.

In the 1956 Burmese general election, she lost her seat to Rohingya police officer Abul Khair. Her husband, however, was re-elected.

== Electoral record ==
1951–52 Burmese general election: Maungdaw South
| Party | Candidate | Popular vote | |
| Party | Candidate | Votes | % |
|---|---|---|---|
| AFPFL | Daw Aye Nyunt | 7,095 | 75.41 |
| Independent | U Saw Pru | 1,375 | 14.61 |
| Independent | M. K. Rahman | 910 | 9.67 |
| Independent | Sultan Ahmed | 17 | 0.18 |
| Independent | Nur Ahmed | 12 | 0.13 |
Source: Front page of The Nation, 4 December 1951
