= Sultan Mahmud (minister) =

Burmese politician (1900–1982)

Minister of Health of the Union of Burma
- In office 1960–1962
- Preceded by: U Tun Tin (1958–1960)
- Succeeded by: Brigadier General Than Pe (1962)

Member of the Union Parliament from Buthidaung North
- In office 1957–1958

Member of the Union Parliament from Buthidaung North
- In office 1960–1962

Personal details
- Born: 1900 Akyab, Arakan Division, Burma Province, British Indian Empire (now in Myanmar)
- Died: 1982 (aged 81–82) Yangon, Myanmar

Sultan Mahmud (1900–1982) was a politician from Arakan, Burma (now Rakhine State, Myanmar). In the British Raj (which included Burma Province until 1937), Mahmud served as cabinet secretary in the Central Legislative Assembly. After Burmese independence, he was elected to the Parliament of Burma through a by election from Buthidaung in 1957. He was re-elected in 1960. He served as Minister of Health of the Union of Burma from 1960 till the 1962 Burmese coup d'état.

When Burma was considering becoming a federal state under Prime Minister U Nu's "unity in diversity" policies, Mahmud proposed that Arakanese Indians should either have a separate province covering the area between the Naf and Kaladan Rivers; or if a separate Arakan province is established with Arakanese Buddhists, it should have a confessionalist structure, with Muslims and Buddhists alternating as provincial governor.

== Early life ==
Mahmud was born in Akyab in 1900. He was educated in Calcutta.

== Political career ==
When Burma was a part of British India, Mahmud held the important post of cabinet secretary in the Central Legislative Assembly in New Delhi. During a by-election in 1957, Mahmud was elected to the Union Parliament from Buthidaung North constituency. He was appointed health minister in the cabinet of Prime Minister of Burma U Nu. Mahmud was re-elected during the 1960 Burmese general election. He was head of a Arakanese Muslim Association and Arakanese Muslims Organization.

Mr. Mahmud was arrested by the British after the war because he participated in the Indian liberation movement and helped Japanese forces and BIA forces to enter Arakan during the war. He was sentenced for ten months at the Jhingergacha jail, Josore. He was freed after Japan forces surrendered. In 1962, after dictator U Ne Win coup, minister Mahmud escaped and asylum in East Pakistan. He returned to his country in 1970.

During his tenure as health minister, several hospitals were established in Arakan, including the Akyab General Hospital and Buthidaung Hospital. As an MP, Mahmud persuaded the education ministry to establish several schools, including the Shaheb Bazaar State Middle School and Minglagyi State Middle School. He also managed to create a scholarship program for Arakanese Muslim students to study in Britain.

== Statehood question ==
After winning in the 1960 general election, Prime Minister U Nu appointed an Inquiry Commission to study whether Arakan Division should be granted statehood. The commission found that most Arakanese Buddhists supported statehood, whereas most Arakanese Muslims opposed statehood. Sultan Mahmud proposed that a state for Arakanese Indians be established in the northern part of Arakan, where Indians were a majority. Mahmud cited the Mughal Empire's expeditions up till the Kaladan River under Shaista Khan in 1666 as forming the basis of the boundary between Arakanese Muslims and Buddhists. The Kaladan River divided Muslim-majority and Buddhist-majority areas.

=== Memorandum ===
On 20 October 1960, Sultan Mahmud and his colleagues submitted a memorandum to the Statehood Consultative Committee. The memorandum laid down two conditions for statehood: 1) if the Arakanese Buddhists would support their demands; and 2) if the constitution of the proposed province would include adequate safeguards for Indian autonomy. The governor of the new state would alternate between Arakanese Muslims and Arakanese Buddhists.

The proposal mentioned that if the governor of a state was a Muslim, then the Speaker of the State Council would have to be a non-Muslim, but his deputy, a Muslim; and vice versa. The same arrangement would apply to most other elected or appointed public bodies. The memorandum called for freedom of religion, including freedom to learn religious studies in educational institutions, according to personal beliefs. Arakanese Muslims should be allowed to develop the Rohingya language and culture. The chief executive would have a designated officer to oversee the affairs of Arakanese Muslims .
