= Abul Khair (legislator) =

Burmese politician and police officer

Abul Khair MP
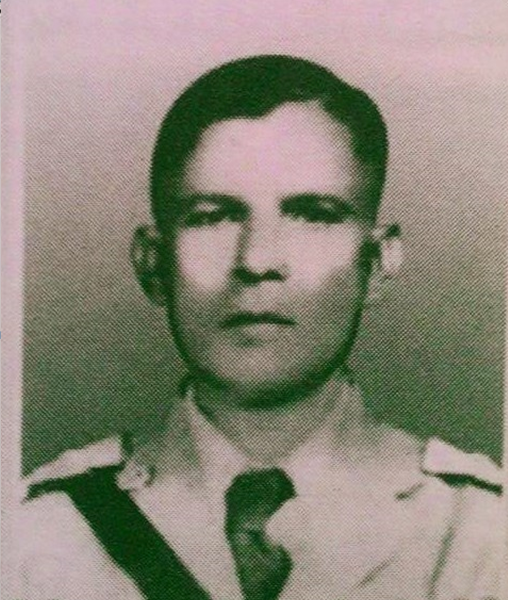

Member of the Union Parliament
- In office 1956–1962
- Preceded by: Aye Nyunt
- Constituency: Maungdaw South

President of the Maungdaw Township Council
- In office 1955–1956

Personal details
- Born: Maungdaw, Arakan, Burma
- Party: Anti-Fascist People's Freedom League

Abul Khair was a Rohingya police officer in British Burma who was later elected to the parliament of the Union of Burma.

== Early life ==
Khair was born in Maungdaw, Akyab District in the Arakan Division of Burma (now Rakhine State, Myanmar). He served in the Imperial Police Force (once part of the Indian Imperial Police) in Arakan Division, with postings in Buthidaung, Kyaukpyu and Sandoway.

== Political career ==
Khair was elected president of the township council of Maungdaw in 1955. He was nominated by the Anti-Fascist People's Freedom League, the founding political party of Burma. During the 1956 Burmese general election, he was elected as the MP for Maungdaw South, succeeding fellow Rohingya Aye Nyunt. He received the highest vote share among Rohingya candidates. Khair worked to establish schools and exam centers across Arakan Division.

Khair was involved in deliberations regarding Arakan's statehood.

== See also ==
- Rohingya people
