= Awnchinkap Veng =

Village in India

Awnchinkap Veng is a small village of a few hundred residents located in Churachandpur district, Manipur, in Northeast India. The locality is near Zomi Colony and Mission Veng. It is primarily inhabited by members of the ethnic Zou community, who worship at the nearby Zou Presbyterian Church Synod. Awnchinkap Veng is within walking distance of a civic centre, with auto services also available from the civic centre from early morning to evening. It was founded by its namesake, Pu Awnchinkap Lianzaw.
