= Manniang Veng =

- neihbourhood
- Location within Manipur Location within India
- Coordinates: 24.349°N 93.69°E
- State: Manipur
- District: Churachandpur district

Manniang Veng is neighbourhood in the Churachandpur Town (also called Lamka) in the Indian state of Manipur. Manniang Veng, named after the first settler's wife, is a western extension of Zomi Colony. Like Zomi Colony, the new settlement is predominantly inhabited by the Zou community. But unlike Zomi Colony, Manniang Veng is built on an elevated slope on the western margin of Lamka town.
