= POCL =

POCL may refer to:

- Patriotic Old Comrades' League, a former political party in Myanmar.
- Premier Oil Company Limited, a former name of Pakistan State Oil
- Power over Camera Link, a Camera Link interface
- PoCL ("Portable Computing Language"), an OpenCL implementation that supports CPUs as well as certain GPUs and ASIPs
- LGV Paris Orléans Clermont-Ferrand Lyon, a high-speed rail project in France

== See also ==
- Phosphoryl chloride (POCl_{3})
