= Burma Trade Union Congress =

Trade union organization in Burma

The Burma Trade Union Congress was a central trade union organization in Burma. The BTUC was founded in December 1950 as the trade union wing of the Burma Workers and Peasants Party. BTUC emerged after a split from the Trade Union Congress (Burma) (TUC(B)). Thakin Lwin, former Minister of Labour (1948-1949), served as the president of BTUC. The BTUC was affiliated with the World Federation of Trade Unions.

BTUC held its first congress in Rangoon February 9–12, 1951.
