= All-Shan State Organisation =

The All-Shan State Organisation (Burmese: ရှမ်းပြည်လုံးဆိုင်ရာ အဖွဲ့ချုပ်) was a political party in Burma.

== History ==
The party was established as a breakaway from or rival to the United Hill People's Congress in the mid-1950s. Affiliated with the Anti-Fascist People's Freedom League, it won four seats in the Chamber of Deputies in the 1956 elections. However, it lost all four seats in the 1960 elections when its vote share was reduced to just 0.3%.
