= United National Pa-O Organisation =

The United National Pa-O Organisation (UNPO) was a political party in Burma.

== History ==
Representing the Pa'O people of Shan State, the UNPO won three seats in the 1951–52 general elections. It was reduced to one seat in the 1956 general elections, but returned to its previous strength of three seats following the 1960 elections in which it received around 50,000 votes.
