= Thakin Chit Maung =

Burmese politician

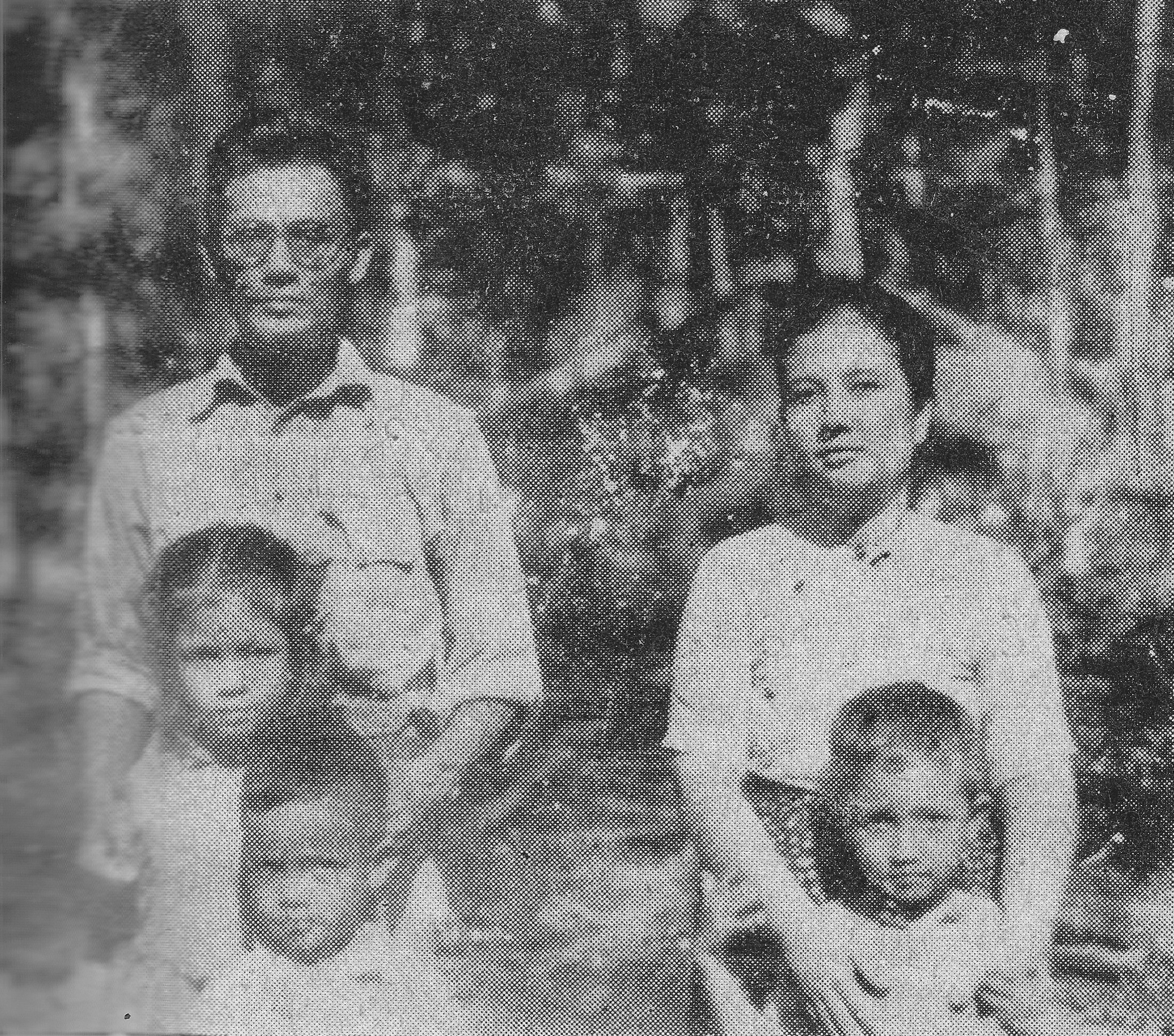
Thakhin Chit and family.

Thakin Chit Maung (Burmese: ချစ်မောင်; 1915 – 3 March 2005), also known as Widuya Thakin Chit Maung, was a veteran Burmese politician.

== Political career ==
His political career in Burma (also called Myanmar) began as a teenager in the early 1930s when he joined the nationalist organisation, Dobama Asiayone (We Burmans Association). He participated in the anti-British campaign led by General Aung San (father of Aung San Suu Kyi) and fought against the Japanese during World War II.

In 1950, Chit Maung helped established the Burma Workers and Peasants Party, nicknamed the "Red Socialists",.

As there is another Burmese politician Thakin Chit Maung of the same name and as both of them took the appellation 'Thakin', 'Master' - this Thakin Chit Maung is known by the additional acronym mentioned usually before his name: 'Widura'. Hence Widura Thakin Chit Maung.

Widura Thakin Chit Maung earned this additional name around February 1959 after he gave a speech in the then Burmese Parliament. In his speech Thakin Chit Maung compared the travails of the Burmese people during the caretaker administration of General Ne Win with the travails that the embryo ('would-be') Buddha had gone through in the Buddha's previous existence as the Minister Widura which were depicted in The Jataka Tales.

Thakin Chit Maung's speech in Parliament was broadcast live on radio at that time and soon thereafter he gained the appellation or honorific of 'Widura Thakin Chit Maung'. Thakin Chit Maung who was then a member of Parliament representing the leftist National United Front (not to be confused with National Unity Party of the renamed Burma Socialist Programme Party formed in late September 1988) opposed the then proposed amendment to Section 116 of the 1947 Burmese Constitution which would allow General Ne Win to continue to serve as 'care taker Prime Minister' (Section 116 of the 1947 Burmese Constitution stated in effect that no person who is not a member of Parliament shall serve as a Minister or Prime Minister for more than six months. General Ne Win was not a member of Parliament and since by February 1959 he had served as prime minister for nearly six months there were moves to amend the Constitution in order for General Ne Win to continue to serve as caretaker prime minister. The Constitution was amended and General Ne Win's caretaker government held multiparty elections in February 1960. The Clean Faction of the Anti-Fascist People's Freedom League (AFPFL) led by U Nu won the 1960 elections by a landslide and General Ne Win handed back power to U Nu.)

The other Burmese politician Thakin Chit Maung is known by the name of his home town Myanaung and hence Thakin Chit Maung (Myanaung). Both Thakin Chit Maung (Widura) and Thakin Chit Maung (Myanaung) were members of the Internal Unity Advisory Board (IUAB) informally known as the 'Thirty-three' since there were 33 members in the Board. The late General Ne Win, then Chairman of the Union Revolutionary Council (also known as RC) that has taken over power through a military coup on 2 March 1962 formed the IUAB on 2 December 1968 and the Board was to report its suggestions to the RC by 31 May 1969 to enhance 'national unity'.

Thakin Chit Maung also formed the Democratic Front for National Reconstruction in the 1980s and joined the Veteran Politicians Group in the late 1980s. The Veteran Politicians Group later sent open letters to Burma's then military ruler, Senior General Than Shwe, urging the release of Aung San Suu Kyi and for national reconciliation talks to take place between the State Peace and Development Council (SPDC), the National League for Democracy (NLD) and the various ethnic groups throughout the country.

Thakin Chit Maung died at the age of 90 in Rangoon on 3 March 2005.
