= Thakin Lwin =

Burmese politician (1914–1996)

Thakhin Lwin
- သခင်လွင်
- Born: 5 November 1914; Zigon, Tharrawaddy District, British Burma
- Died: 20 December 1996 (aged 82); Yangon, Myanmar
- Occupations: Politician; writer

Thakin Lwin (Burmese: သခင်လွင်, pronounced [θəkʰɪ̀ɰ̃ lwɪ̀ɰ̃]; 5 November 1914 – 20 December 1996) was a Burmese politician and trade unionist, writer and journalist. He was a leading member of the anti-colonial Dobama Asiayone movement, a parliamentarian, the president of the Trade Union Congress (Burma) and a prominent leader of the Burma Workers and Peasants Party.

== Early life ==
Lwin was born in Zigon, Tharrawaddy District, in 1914 to a family of traders. He finished high school in 1936.

== Political life ==
=== Pre-war ===
Lwin served as the secretary of the Oilfield Workers' Association between 1938 and 1941. Lwin's discourse for organising workers was based on a combination of nationalism and communalism. He and other revolutionary leftwing Thakins mobilized support for the oilworkers' strike of 1938, giving revolutionary speeches in favour of Marxism-Leninism. Basing themselves of the experiences of the oilworkers' strike, a preparatory committee to set up a 'All Burma Workers Asiayone' was formed in 1939. Lwin was one of the members of the preparatory committee.

During the Second World War, Lwin was put in charge of the Pakokku District by the People's Revolutionary Party.

In 1945, Lwin became a Central Executive Committee member of the People's Freedom (Socialist) Party. In 1947 he was elected as a member of parliament.

=== Post-war ===
In 1949 he became the president of the Trade Union Congress. Under Lwin's leadership, the TUC(B) steered towards an openly communist line. At the May Day rally of 1950, TUC(B) demonstrators had carried large portraits of Karl Marx, Friedrich Engels, Vladimir Lenin, Joseph Stalin and Mao Zedong. In his speech at the rally, Lwin publicly declared that TUC(B) followed the 'communist party line' and said that the organisation should join the World Federation of Trade Unions. He harshly condemned the policy of the Burmese government of accepting British financial aid. But he also denounced the White Flag Communist Party, Red Flag Communist Party and Josip Broz Tito as 'deviationists'. Lwin's speech made the ongoing division in the Socialist Party public.

Lwin's May Day speech had political repercussions, but did not result in any immediate disciplinary action from the Socialist Party or the AFPFL. However, when the TUC(B) vice-president and AFPFL Member of Parliament Thakin Hla Kywe lashed out at the governments support for the Korean War in September 1950, the AFPFL decided to suspend the TUC(B) from the AFPFL. The AFPFL demanded that Lwin and Hla Kywe be removed from their positions in order for the TUC(B) to be reintegrated into the AFPFL. The TUC(B) complied and demoted Lwin and Hla Kywe.

In December 1950, Lwin was one of 42 leading cadres of the Socialist Party which denounced the party leadership of Ba Swe and Kyaw Nyein and went on to found a new party, the Burma Workers and Peasants Party. Lwin became one of the main leader of the BWPP. Lwin became the president of the Burma Trade Union Congress (BTUC).

During the 1950s he was active in the National Unity Front, and electoral front launched by the BWPP ahead of the 1955 elections. He also served as the chairman of the Burma Conference to Defend World Peace.

Lwin retired from political life following the 1962 coup. However, with the democratic opening in 1988, he again became active in politics in September 1988. He became chairman of the People's Democratic Party. His party become officially registered on 4 October 1988.

== Literary and journalism career ==
Lwin founded the Shudaung Journal (lit. Viewpoint Journal) in 1969 and was the chief editor of the journal until its closing in 1971.

He also wrote several books. The notable ones are:

- Alouthama Lawka Htudaunggya, 1947 (Let's Build A Workers' World, အလုပ်သမား လောက ထူထောင်ကြ)
- Thway Mye Kya Taikpwe (May Day Thamaing), 1949 (Bloodied Battle: History of May Day, သွေးမြေကျ တိုက်ပွဲ (မေဒေး သမိုင်း))
- Thakin Kodaw Hmaing Hnint Pyidwin Nyein-gyan-yay, 1956 (Thakin Kodaw Hmaing and Peace in Domestic Affairs, သခင် ကိုယ်တော်မှိုင်းနှင့် ပြည်တွင်း ငြိမ်းချမ်းရေး)
- U Ottama Letywayzin, 1967 (Select Writings of U Ottama, ဦးဥတ္တမ လက်ရွေးစင်)
- Myanma Naingngan Alouthama Hloushahmu Thamaing, 1968 (History of Burmese Workers Movement, မြန်မာ နိုင်ငံ အလုပ်သမား လှုပ်ရှားမှု သမိုင်း) – Winner, Myanmar National Literary Award, Second Prize
- Japan Khit Myanma Pyi, 1969 (Japanese Burma, ဂျပန်ခေတ် မြန်မာပြည်)
- Azani Ashin U Wisara, 1971 (U Wisara the Martyr, အာဇာနည် အရှင် ဦးဝိစာရ)
- The-baw Shin-bet, (translated), 1972 (သေဖော်ရှင်ဖက်)

== Death ==
Lwin died in his Yangon residence on 20 December 1996. A funeral service was held on 24 December 1996. It was attended by family, friends, politicians and diplomatic representatives. Aung San Suu Kyi was barred from assisting the funeral, as she was under house arrest. Her party, the National League for Democracy, was represented at the funeral by party vice chairman Kyi Maung.
