= Patriotic Alliance (Burma) =

Political alliance in Burma

The Patriotic Alliance was a political alliance in Burma formed in opposition to the ruling Anti-Fascist People's Freedom League (AFPFL).

== History ==
The Patriotic Alliance was formed in the 1950s in order to oppose the ruling Anti-Fascist People's Freedom League (AFPFL) by prominent pre-war politicians including Ba Maw and U Ba Pe. Prior to the 1951–52 general elections it joined the People's Democratic Front (PDF) alliance alongside the Burma Workers and Peasants Party and the Burma Democratic Party. The PDF won 19 of the 250 seats in the Chamber of Deputies, emerging as the main opposition to the AFPFL, which had won 199 seats.

In the 1955 municipal elections in Rangoon the Patriotic Alliance received 29% of the vote, but won only one of the 35 seats. The alliance was disbanded by the time of the 1956 general elections, with most of its factions joining the National United Front.
