= United Nationalities Alliance =

Political alliance of Myanmar minority parties

The United Nationalities Alliance (Burmese: စည်းလုံးညီညွတ်သောတိုင်းရင်းသားလူမျိုးများမဟာမိတ်, abbreviated UNA) is a political alliance of parties representing several ethnic minorities in Myanmar. The UNA's charter establishes nine basic federal principles as a roadmap for federalism in Myanmar.

UNA's predecessor, the United Nationalities League for Democracy, was first formed after the 1990 Myanmar general election, encompassing 12 political parties, the largest of which was the Shan Nationalities League for Democracy (SNLD). The UNA subsequently went dormant, due to political oppression under military rule. It was revived as the UNA in 2012 by eight founding members, including the SNLD, Zomi Congress for Democracy, Arakan League for Democracy, and Mon Democracy Party.
