= Patriotic Alliance (disambiguation) =

Political parties known as Patriotic Alliance include:

== Africa ==
- Patriotic Alliance, a political party in South Africa

== Asia ==
- Bagong Alyansang Makabayan (English: New Patriotic Alliance), an alliance of leftist militant organisations in the Philippines
- Democratic Patriotic Alliance of Kurdistan, a former electoral coalition in Iraq
- Patriotic Alliance (Burma), a defunct political alliance in Myanmar

== Europe ==
- Patriotic Alliance (Greece), a former political party in Greece

== North America ==
- National Alliance for Belizean Rights, formerly known as the Patriotic Alliance for Territorial Integrity, a former political party in Belize
- Sint Maarten Patriotic Alliance, a political party in Sint Maarten
- Patriotic Alliance (Costa Rica), a political party in Costa Rica

== South America ==
- Honduran Patriotic Alliance, a political party in Honduras
- Patriotic Alliance for Change, a former electoral alliance in Paraguay
