= Arakanese Muslim Association =

The Arakanese Muslim Association was a political party in Burma. The party was led by Sultan Mahmud, who served as Minister of Health during the U Nu period.

== History ==
Affiliated with the Anti-Fascist People's Freedom League, the party won three seats in the Chamber of Deputies in the 1951–52 elections.
