= Daizang =

Village in Manipur, India

Coordinates: 24.294°N 93.717°E

Daizang is a village located in Churachandpur District of Manipur, India. The village is best known for hosting the first Jou Chritian Association (JCA) Conference on 20 February 1954. The meeting marked the mass conversion of the Zou community from their traditional Sakhua (Lawki) religion to the Christian faith.

Daizang is also the birthplace of the Zomi National Congress, formed in 1972.
