= 1951–52 Burmese general election =

- June 1951 – April 1952

All 250 seats in the Chamber of Deputies 126 seats needed for a majority
- Turnout: 18.75%
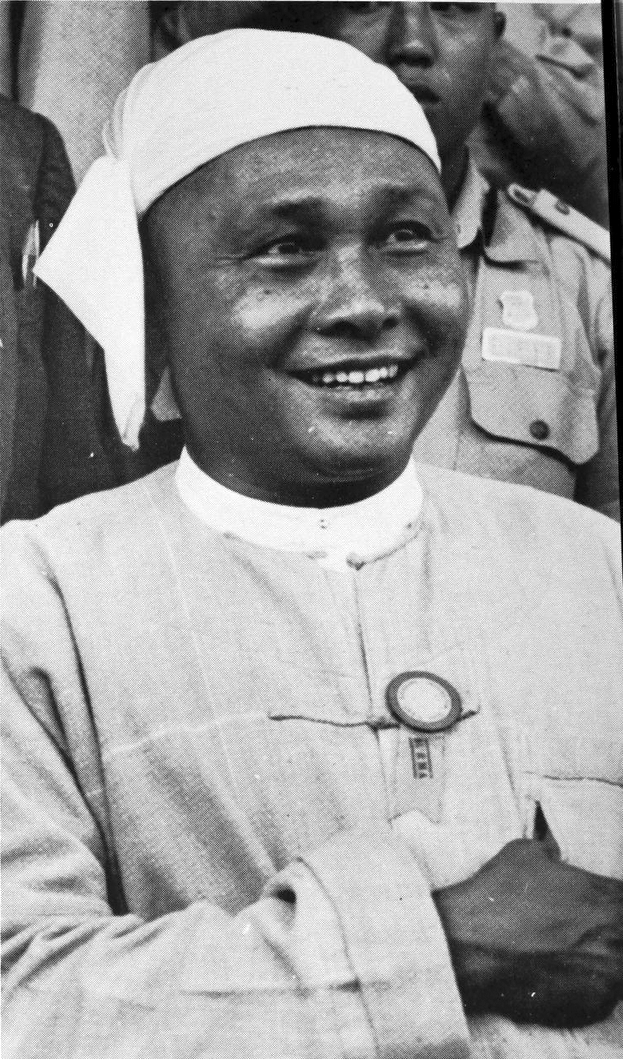

	First party	Second party
Leader	U Nu
Party	AFPFL	PDF
Seats won	147	19
Seat change	▼26	New
Prime Minister before election
U Nu
AFPFL
Prime Minister-elect
U Nu
AFPFL

General elections were held in Burma over several months between June 1951 and April 1952 due to internal conflict within the country.

The first elections since independence, they saw the Anti-Fascist People's Freedom League (AFPFL) win 60% of the vote and 199 out of 250 seats. Voter turnout was low at 20%, as only 1.5 million voters out of an eligible 8 million participated. It was the lowest turnout for a Burmese election since the 1920s boycotts in colonial Burma.

== Results ==
Party	Votes	%	Seats	+/–
Anti-Fascist People's Freedom League			147	–26
AFPFL allies (Note: Included the Burma Socialist Party, the All-Burma Peasants Organisation, the Burma Muslim Congress, the Kachin National Congress (7 seats), the Union Karen League (13), the Chin Hills Congress, the United Hill People's Congress, the All-Burma Women's Freedom League, the All-Burma Federation of Trade Organisations and the Arakanese Muslim Association (3).)			52	+33
People's Democratic Front (Note: Alliance of the Burma Workers and Peasants Party (12 seats), the Patriotic Alliance and the Burma Democratic Party.)			19	New
Independent Arakanese Parliamentary Group			6	New
Greater Burma Party			0	New
People's Peace Front			0	New
Union of Burma League			0	New
United Chin Freedom League			0	New
Independents			15	+13
Vacant			11	–
Total			250	+40
Total votes	1,500,000	–		
Registered voters/turnout	8,000,000	18.75		
Source: Nohlen et al.
