= Mon National Front =

Political party in Burma

The Mon National Front was a political party in Burma.

== History ==
The party contested national elections for the first and only time in 1960, when it won three seats in the Chamber of Deputies.
