= Kachin State National Congress for Democracy =

Kachin State National Congress for Democracy ကချင်အမျိုးသားများ ဒီမိုကရေစီကွန်ဂရက်
- President: Galau Lang Yaw
- Founded: 1988
- Headquarters: Myitkyina, Kachin State, Myanmar
- Membership: 13,000+
- Colours: Red, green, white

Party flag

The Kachin State National Congress for Democracy (Burmese: ကချင်အမျိုးသားများဒီမိုကရေစီကွန်ဂရက်; KNCD) is a political party in Myanmar.

== History ==
Following the reintroduction of multi-party democracy after the 8888 Uprising, the party was established in 1988. The party contested nine seats in the 1990 general elections, receiving 0.11% of the vote and winning three seats; U G. Bawn Hlan in Chiphwe, U Zau Ein in Sumprabum and U Oo Byit Tu in Myitkyina 2.

The party was banned by the military government on 6 March 1992. However, it was later re-established, and boycotted the 2010 elections.
