= Shan State Peasants' Organisation =

Former political party in Burma (Myanmar)

The Shan State Peasants' Organisation (SSPO) was a political party in Burma.

== History ==
The party was formed by U Htun Aye, former head of the Shan State People's Freedom League, in order to contest the 1956 general elections. It received 0.8% of the vote, winning two seats. It did not run in the 1960 elections.
