= People's Democratic Front (Burma) =

Political alliance in Burma

The People's Democratic Front (PDF) was a political alliance in Burma.

== History ==
The People's Democratic Front was formed by left-wing politicians in 1951 in order to oppose the ruling Anti-Fascist People's Freedom League (AFPFL). Its members included the Burma Workers and Peasants Party, the Patriotic Alliance, the Burma Democratic Party and the Burma Trades Union Congress.

The PDF won 19 of the 250 seats in the Chamber of Deputies in the 1951–52 general elections, emerging as the main opposition to the AFPFL, which had won 199 seats. In 1955 it was succeeded by the National United Front alliance.
