= Nationalities Brotherhood Federation =

Political alliance of Myanmar minority parties

The Nationalities Brotherhood Federation (Burmese: ညီနောင်တိုင်းရင်းသားပါတီများဖက်ဒရေးရှင်း, abbreviated NBF) is a political alliance of parties representing several ethnic minorities in Myanmar. As of June 2019, NBF had 22 members. The NBF has three primary objectives: federal union building, equal developments of all ethnic nationalities, and democracy. NBF supports a more incremental approach towards establishing a federal union in Myanmar as compared to the United Nationalities Alliance.

NBF's precursor, the Nationalities Brotherhood Forum, was founded in 2011 by political parties that successfully contested the 2010 Myanmar general election, securing a total of 127 seats at the regional and national levels. Due to its members' participation in the 2010 Myanmar general election, the NBF has been dubbed the '2010 alliance,' and is perceived to be allied to the military's proxy party, the Union Solidarity and Development Party. The forum was replaced by the Federation in 2013. Founding members included the All Mon Region Democratic Party (AMDRP), Palon Sawor Democratic Party (PSDP), Shan Nationalities Democratic Party (SNDP), Rakhine Nationalities Development Party (RNDP), and Chin National Party (CNP).
