= People's Peace Front =

Defunct political party in Burma

The People's Peace Front (Burmese: ပြည်သူ့ငြိမ်းချမ်းရေး အဖွဲ့ပေါင်းစု) was a political party in Burma.

== History ==
The party was established by former Anti-Fascist People's Freedom League member U Aung Than, the older brother of former AFPFL leader Aung San, in order to contest the 1951–52 elections. Its leadership also included U Do, the brother of Prime Minister U Nu. The party failed to win a seat in the elections.

Prior to the 1956 elections it joined the National United Front alliance, which went on to win 48 of the 250 seats in the Chamber of Deputies.
