= People's Educational and Cultural Development Organisation =

The People's Educational and Cultural Development Organisation (Burmese: ပြည်သူ့ ယဉ်ကျေးမှုနှင့် တိုးတက် ကြီးပွားရေးအဖွဲ့; PEDCO) was a political party in Burma.

== History ==
The party was established in 1953 by Sima Duwa, a traditional Kachin leader. It became loosely affiliated with the ruling Anti-Fascist People's Freedom League (AFPFL), and received 1.3% of the vote in the 1956 general elections, winning four seats; its major rival, the Kachin National Congress, won two seats.

After the AFPFL split in 1958, PEDCO allied itself with the Clean AFPFL. The 1960 elections saw its vote share reduced to 0.7%, as it was reduced to two seats.
