= Chamber of Nationalities =

Upper house of the Union Parliament of Burma from 1952 to 1962

Chamber of Nationalities လူမျိုးစုလွှတ်တော် Lumyozu Hluttaw

Type
- Type: Upper house of the Union Parliament

History
- Founded: 1952
- Disbanded: 1962
- Preceded by: Constituent Assembly of Burma (1947–1948; serving as Provisional Parliament in 1948–1952)
- Succeeded by: Pyithu Hluttaw (1974–1988)
- Seats: 125

Elections
- Last election: 1960

Meeting place
- Government Secretariat, Rangoon

The Chamber of Nationalities (Burmese: လူမျိုးစုလွှတ်တော်) was the upper house of the bicameral Union Parliament of Burma (Myanmar) from 1952 (Note: Act of Salaries of the Speakers and Deputy Speakers of the Chamber of Nationalities and the Speakers and Deputy Speakers of the Chamber of Deputies of the Union Parliament, 1952. [Act No. I of 1952]: 1. This Act shall come into force on the day of the first session of the first Parliament convened under Chapter 6 of the Constitution....: 5. The Constituent Assembly (Salaries of the Speaker and the Deputy Speaker) Act, 1948 (Act No. III of 1948) is repealed.; Effective date shown on the Myanmar Law Information System: 3.3.1952) to 1962. Under the 1947 Constitution, bills initiated and passed by the lower house, the Chamber of Deputies, were to be sent to the Chamber of Nationalities for review and revision. The Chamber of Nationalities was primarily formed to give minorities within Burma some political power in the union government. Before the first session of the bicameral Union Parliament was elected and assembled according to the constitution, the Constituent Assembly of Burma served as the Provisional Parliament.

It consisted of 125 seats, with the constitution providing for specified numbers of representatives from all states and divisions. 25 seats were allotted to Shan State, 12 to Kachin State, 8 seats to Special Division of the Chins (now Chin State), 3 seats to Karenni State (now Kayah State), 24 to ethnic Karens, and 53 to all other territories (including divisions), including 4 seats reserved for the Anglo-Burmese community. The parliament was abolished after Ne Win suspended the 1947 Constitution following a military coup on 3 March 1962.

A single-party unicameral People's Assembly replaced the parliament in 1974, under a new Constitution that was approved in a 1973 referendum, and adopted on 3 January 1974.

== Speakers of the Chamber of Nationalities ==
Name	Took office	Left office	Notes
Sao Shwe Thaik	March 1952	1960	
Sao Hkun Kyi	11 April 1960	March 1962	
