= Chin Sian Thang =

Burmese politician (1938–2021)

Pu Cin Sian Thang
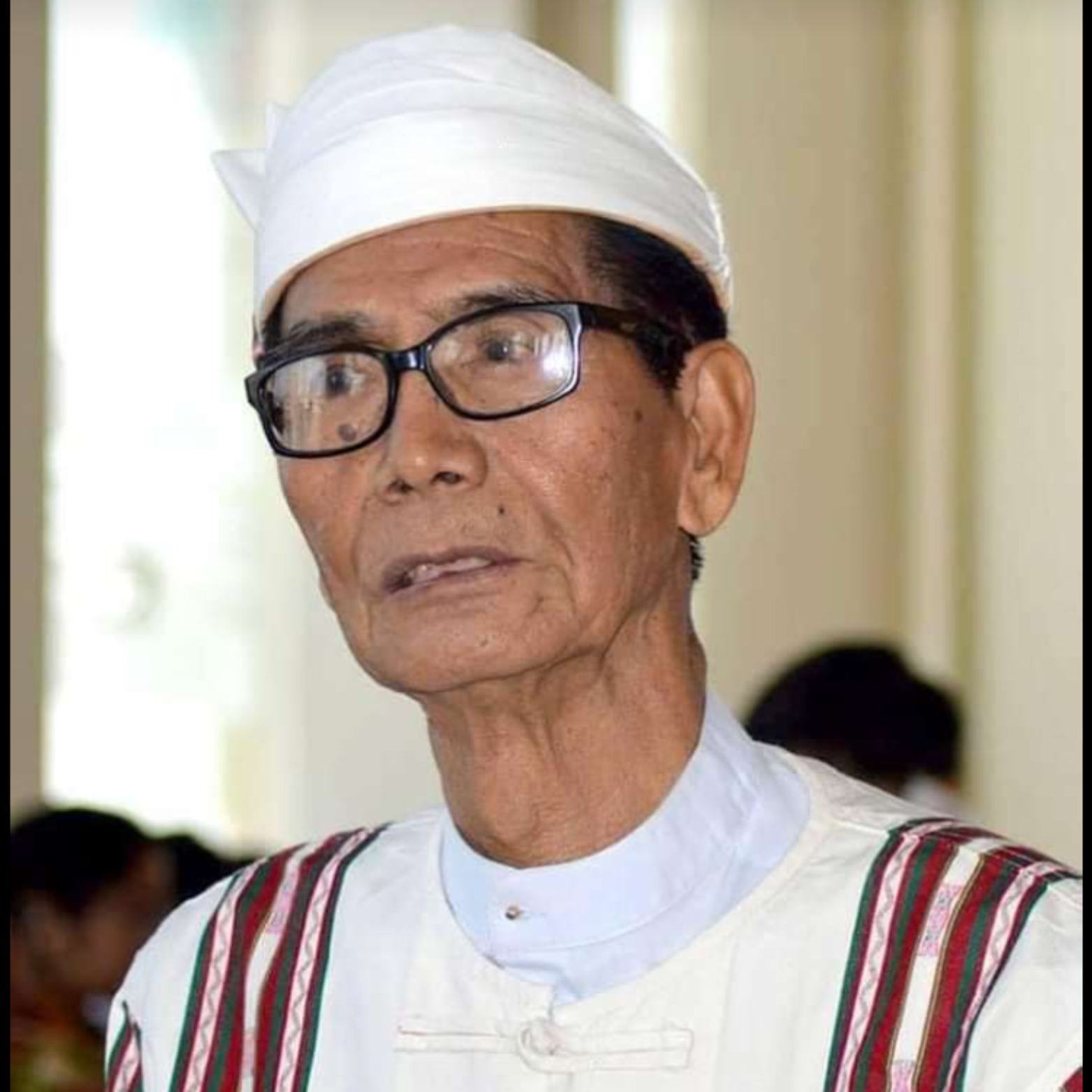

Pyidaungsu Hluttaw
- In office 6 April 2016 – 1 February 2021
- President: Htin Kyaw; Win Myint

President of the Zomi Congress for Democracy

Personal details
- Born: April 6, 1938 Tedim, Chin Hills, British Burma
- Died: July 31, 2021 (aged 83)
- Party: Zomi Congress for Democracy
- Education: Rangoon University, Yangon (BA); Rangoon University, Yangon (LLB)

Pu Cin Sian Thang (Burmese: ပူးကျင့်ရှင်းထန်, romanized: puu kyang shinn htaan; 6 April 1938 – 31 July 2021) was a Burmese politician who was chairman of the Zomi Congress for Democracy, formerly the Zomi National Congress, a political party in Myanmar (formerly Burma).

== Biography ==
Elected as a member of parliament during Burma's ill-fated 1990 elections, he had worked diligently for many years in defiance of the country's ruling junta. During the 1960s, Chin Sian Thang served as a leader of the Chin Ethnic Student Union while a student at Rangoon University. He was a pro-democracy activist and a strong opponent of Burma Socialist Program Party and Ne Win dictatorship. He had been imprisoned on at least six occasions by successive military regimes for his political activities between 1972 and 1999. In each instance, he served two years, during which he was subjected to brutal interrogations that led to permanent health problems.

He also served as a member of the Committee Representing People's Parliament, a group supported by 251 candidates elected in 1990. Considered a moderate ethnic leader, Chin Sian Thang heavily promoted the CRPP as a rallying point for Burmese activists and ethnic leaders. He was the most outspoken elected ethnic leader in Burma. He was a graduate of Rangoon University in Law degrees (B.A., B.A.(Law)., L.L.B . He was the co-author of "In Burma, a Cry for U.N. Help".

Thang died from COVID-19 in July 2021, at the age of 83.
