= Zomi Colony =

Zomi Colony Zou/Zo Khopi
- Ward
- Location in Manipur, India Zomi Colony (India)
- Coordinates: 24°21′5″N 93°41′56″E
- Country: India
- State: Manipur
- District: Churachandpur
- Founder: Pu Chinkham

Government
  - Body: Village Authority, UZO, ZYO & ZCYC

Area
  - Total: 1.9 km^{2} (0.73 sq mi)
- Elevation: 824.8 m (2,706 ft)

Population (2001)
  - Total: 3,965
  - Density: 2,100/km^{2} (5,400/sq mi)

Languages
  - Official: Meitei
- Time zone: UTC+5:30 (IST)
- PIN: 795128
- Vehicle registration: MN
- Nearest city: Imphal
- Sex ratio: 12:11 ♂:♀
- Literacy: 91.9%%
- Lok Sabha constituency: Outer Manipur
- Vidhan Sabha constituency: Saikot
- Civic agency: Village Authority, UZO, ZYO & ZCYC
- Climate: Temperate Humid (Köppen)
- Website: manipur.gov.in

Zomi Colony is a town ward within the Churachandpur Town (also called Lamka) in the Indian state of Manipur. It has a very high concentration of ethnic Zou community. Both the headquarters of the Zou Synod Presbyterian Church and the Manipur Evangelical Lutheran Church are located within this locality.
