= Independent Arakanese Parliamentary Group =

The Independent Arakanese Parliamentary Group (IAPG) was a political party in Burma.

== History ==
The IAPG was established by U Ba Myaing and U Kyaw Min shortly after Burmese independence in 1948 as a non-socialist alternative to the Anti-Fascist People's Freedom League and gained the nickname "Millionaires' Party". It called for a separate Arakan State and was pro-private enterprise.

The party ran an effective campaign in Arakan District in the 1951–52 elections, winning six seats. and limiting the AFPFL to just three. In 1955 it was the basis for the founding of the Arakanese National Unity Organisation.
