= Trade Union Congress (Burma) =

The Trade Union Congress (Burma) was a central trade union organization in Burma. The TUC(B) was founded by the Socialist Party in November 1945, in an attempt to counter the influence of the communist-led All Burma Trade Union Congress. Ba Cho was the President of TUC(B). The TUC(B) was an affiliate of the governing Anti-Fascist People's Freedom League.

In 1949 Thakin Lwin became the president of the TUC(B). Under Lwin's leadership, the TUC(B) steered towards an openly communist line. This shift could be seen in debates on whether the TUC(B) should join the World Federation of Trade Unions. At the May Day rally of 1950, TUC(B) demonstrators had carried large portraits of Karl Marx, Engels, Vladimir Lenin, Joseph Stalin and Mao Zedong. In his speech at the rally, Lwin publicly declared that TUC(B) followed the 'communist party line' and said that the organisation should join the WFTU. He harshly condemned the policy of the Burmese government of accepting British financial aid. But he also denounced the White Flag Communist Party, Red Flag Communist Party and Josip Broz Tito as 'deviationists'. Lwin's speech made the ongoing division in the Socialist Party public.

Lwin's May Day speech had political repercussions, but did not result in any immediate disciplinary action from the Socialist Party or the AFPFL. However, when the TUC(B) vice-president and AFPFL Member of Parliament Thakin Hla Kywe lashed out at the governments support for the Korean War in September 1950, the AFPFL decided to suspend the TUC(B) from the AFPFL. The AFPFL demanded that Lwin and Hla Kywe be removed from their positions in order for the TUC(B) to be reintegrated into the AFPFL. The TUC(B) complied and demoted Lwin and Hla Kywe. Following this, Lwin and other leftists broke with the Socialist Party and formed the Burma Workers and Peasants Party. In 1951, the socialist leader Ba Swe became the President of TUC(B).
