= Arakanese National Unity Organisation =

The Arakanese National Unity Organisation (ANUO) was a political party in Burma.

== History ==
The party was established in 1955 by members of the Independent Arakanese Parliamentary Group, who held nine seats at the time. In the 1956 elections it opposed the Anti-Fascist People's Freedom League and campaigned with the National United Front. Receiving 1% of the vote, the party won six seats. Prior to the 1960 elections it left the NUF and affiliated with the Clean AFPFL. The elections saw it retain its six seats.
