= Union Karen League =

- Founder: San Po Thin; Mahn Ba Khaing
- Founded: 1947
- Split from: Karen Central Organisation
- Ideology: Karen interests

The Union Karen League was a political party in Burma led by Win Maung.

== History ==
The party was formed by San Po Thin and Mahn Ba Khaing in 1947 after a split in the Karen Central Organisation, and became a member of the Anti-Fascist People's Freedom League. It was initially named Karen Youth Organisation (ကရင်လူငယ်အဖွဲ့), before being renamed.

In the April 1947 elections it won 19 of the 210 seats in the national Constituent Assembly and 21 seats in the Karen State Council, in which it was the largest party. In the 1951–52 elections it was reduced to 13 of the 250 seats in the Chamber of Deputies.

Following the restoration of multi-party democracy in the 1980s, a new Union Karen League was formed. It nominated seven candidates for the 1990 general elections, but failed to win a seat. The party attempted to re-register to contest the 2010 general elections, but was prevented from registering in time to run in the national elections.
