= Chin Hills Congress =

Burmese political party

The Chin Hills Congress was a political party in Burma.

== History ==
The party was established in 1951 by Za Hre Lian. It contested the 1951–52 general elections as an ally of the Anti-Fascist People's Freedom League (AFPFL) and merged into the AFPFL in 1954.
