= Mara People's Party =

The Mara People's Party (Burmese: မရာပြည်သူ့ပါတီ; MPP) was a political party in Myanmar.

== History ==
The party was established in 1990, and contested four seats in the 1990 general elections. It received 0.04% of the vote, winning one seat; U Yo Ok in Matupi 1.

The party was banned by the military government on 11 March 1992.
