= Aung Gyi =

General and coup-leader

- ‌အောင်ကြီး

President of the National League for Democracy
- In office 27 September 1988 – 3 December 1988
- Leader: Aung San Suu Kyi
- Preceded by: Position established
- Succeeded by: Tin Oo

Member of the Revolutionary Council of Burma
- In office 2 March 1962 – 8 February 1963 Serving with Ba Nyein and Tin Pe

Personal details
- Born: 16 February 1919 Paungde, British Burma
- Died: 25 October 2012 (aged 93) Mayangone Township, Yangon, Myanmar
- Cause of death: Heart failure
- Spouse: Mu Mu Thein
- Children: 4
- Occupation: Politician (1963–2012); Deputy Commander-in-Chief (until 1963)

Military service
- Allegiance: (Myanmar) Union of Burma
- Branch/service: Burmese Army
- Years of service: 1948–1963
- Rank: Brigadier General
- Unit: 4th Burma Rifles
- Commands: Western Regional Military Command
- Battles/wars: Rohingya conflict

Brigadier General Aung Gyi (Burmese: အောင်ကြီး [ʔàʊɰ̃ dʑí]; 16 February 1919 – 25 October 2012) was a Burmese military officer and politician. He was a cofounder of the National League for Democracy and served as president of the party.

== Early life ==
He was born to a Burmese family in Paungde, British Burma in 1919.

== Military career ==
Aung Gyi was a member of General Ne Win's 4th Burma Rifles rising to brigadier general.

He played a role in the caretaker government of 1958-1960 led by Ne Win. Aung Gyi was number two in the Union Revolutionary Council set up after the 1962 coup, serving as vice-chief of staff and minister of trade and industry until he was forced to resign on 8 February 1963 because of disagreements over economic policy with Ba Nyein and Tin Pe. He was once known as Ne Win's heir apparent. In his memoirs, Saturday's Son, published in 1974, U Nu, then prime minister of Myanmar, claimed that his handover of power to the caretaker government was not voluntary but that a group of army officers led by Brigadier Aung Gyi and Brigadier Maung Maung threatened him with a "straight military coup" should he refuse to hand over power to Ne Win. The suggestion that this coup was mainly led by Brigadier Aung Gyi and Maung Maung was supported by Col Hla Maw, former commanding officer of 11th Brigade.

Aung Gyi's role in suppressing the anti-government student protests in 1962 is not clear. In his resignation speech of 23 July 1988, Ne Win blamed Aung Gyi as "the real culprit" in the destruction of the Rangoon University Student Union Building on 8 July 1962. Aung Gyi was ousted in 1963, when he criticized the council's economic policies, and for statements made in Japan about the cause of the 1962 coup. He was imprisoned from 1965 to 1968 and again from 1973 to 1974. However, Aung Gyi remained loyal to the Tatmadaw, the armed forces, and his connection with Ne Win remained intact despite his later blunt criticism of the government.

Prior to the 8888 Uprising, Aung Gyi had written several long open letters, widely distributed throughout the country, to Ne Win criticising the government, and they became an important factor for the opposition movement. On 7 March 1988, Aung Gyi wrote his first letter to Ne Win, suggesting economic reforms and a new cabinet. He strongly criticised the government's Burmese Way to Socialism and warned of possible social unrest. On 9 May 1988 he wrote a second 40-page open letter, reiterating the need for economic reforms.

In 1988, he emerged as prominent opposition leader and was imprisoned between 29 July and 25 August 1988. However, he remained a supporter of Ne Win and the army. Just before the army staged its coup on 18 September 1988, he told a crowd that he guaranteed that the army would not stage a coup and the interim government will be formed very soon: "I will kill myself, [if the army staged a coup]". After the coup, Aung Gyi told people who came to listen his speech that they "must not think bad (or 'sin' against) the army even in your minds".

== Founding the NLD ==
The National League for Democracy was formed on 27 September 1988, with Aung Gyi as president, former General Thura Tin Oo as vice president and Aung San Suu Kyi as general secretary. He resigned on 3 December 1988 from the National League for Democracy (NLD), alleging communist infiltration, to form the Union National Democracy Party (UNDP) on 16 December 1988. Only one candidate from the UNDP was elected in the May 1990 Myanmar general elections. At those elections, there were 485 constituencies. The NLD fielded 447 candidates, and 392 were elected.

In 1993 Aung Gyi was sentenced to six months imprisonment for not paying a bill for eggs.

In 1998 he visited the United States and recorded an extensive interview with Radio Free Asia. When asked about the army, he said: "People despise the Tatmadaw. This is a bad sign. The people of Burma have lost faith in the Tatmadaw." While he acknowledged the corruption and nepotism of the top junta leaders, he considered that democracy leader Aung San Suu Kyi was surrounded by communists, the same accusations made by the junta. He blamed the NLD for boycotting the National Convention established to draft a new constitution. He said, "I want U Ne Win to contribute something before he dies, because he knows what is right and wrong". He stated that Ne Win was still influential and had ordered the State Peace and Development Council (SPDC) to change the name of the government and reshape the cabinet in 1997.

Aung Gyi was among the few who attended the funeral of Ne Win in 2002 who spoke fondly of Ne Win's achievements in helping bring independence to Myanmar in 1948, but he also stated that "Ne Win betrayed Burma and Ne Win betrayed the country. He committed rape of democracy in Burma by staging a coup. He died an inglorious death. It was a sad and tragic ending".

== Death ==
On 25 October 2012, Aung Gyi died at his home in Mayangone Township, Yangon, Myanmar, because of heart failure. He is survived by his wife Mu Mu Thein, four children and five grandchildren.
