= Democracy Party (Myanmar) =

Political party in Myanmar

The Democracy Party (Burmese: ဒီမိုကရေစီပါတီ) was a political party in Myanmar.

== History ==
Following the reintroduction of multi-party democracy after the 8888 Uprising, the Democracy Party was the first party to register when registration opened on 1 October 1988. It contested 105 seats in the 1990 general elections. It received 0.5% of the vote winning a single seat, U Tun Hlaing in the Bahan constituency in Yangon.

The party was banned by the military government on 11 March 1992.
