= Union Danu League for Democracy Party =

The Union Danu League for Democracy Party (Burmese: ပြည်ထောင်စု ဓနုအမျိုးသားများ ဒီမိုကရေစီအဖွဲ့ချုပ်; UDLD) was a political party in Myanmar.

== History ==
Following the reintroduction of multi-party democracy after the 8888 Uprising, the party contested four seats in the 1990 general elections. It received 0.17% of the vote, winning one seat; U Myint Than in Kalaw.

The party was banned by the military government on 13 February 1992.
