= Kayah National United League =

The Kayah National Unity League was a political party in Burma.

== History ==
Established as an ally of the Clean AFPFL (the Kayah Democratic League allied itself with the Stable AFPFL), the party represented the Kayah of Karen and Shan states. In the 1960 general elections it won a single seat.
