= Burma Nationalist Party =

The Burma Nationalist Party (BNP) was a political party in Burma.

== History ==
The party won a single seat in the 1956 elections. In the campaign for the 1960 general elections it called for the posts of president, prime minister and chief justice to be reserved for Buddhists; It lost its seat in the elections.
