= Union National Democracy Party =

Defunct political party in Myanmar (1988–1992)

The Union National Democracy Party (UNDP) was a political party in Myanmar from 1988 to 1992.

== History ==
The UNDP was formed on 16 December 1988 by Aung Gyi after he left the National League for Democracy, of which he had previously been the chairman. The party contested 247 of the 485 seats in the 1990 general elections, but received only 1.5% of the vote, the sixth-highest vote share, winning one seat – U Aung Thein in Ywangan.

The party was banned by the military government on 18 March 1992.
