= Graduates and Old Students Democratic Association =

The Graduates and Old Students Democratic Association (Burmese: ဒီမိုကရက်တစ် တက္ကသိုလ်ဘွဲ့ရနှင့် ကျောင်းသားဟောင်းများအဖွဲ့; GOSDA) was a political party in Myanmar.

== History ==
Following the reintroduction of multi-party democracy after the 8888 Uprising, the party contested ten seats in the 1990 general elections. It received 0.08% of the vote, winning one seat; U Maung Maung Aung in Pabedan.

The party was banned by the military government on 11 March 1992.
