= Naga Hills Regional Progressive Party =

Political party in Myanmar

The Naga Hills Regional Progressive Party (Burmese: နာဂတောင်တန်းဒေသတိုးတက်ရေးပါတီ; NHRPP) was a political party in Myanmar.

== History ==
Following the reintroduction of multi-party democracy after the 8888 Uprising, the party contested six seats in the 1990 general elections. It received 0.08% of the vote, winning two seats; U Khapo Kailon in Lahe and U Dwe Pawt in Leshi.

The party was abolished by the military government on 18 March 1992.
