= United Hill People's Congress =

Political Party

The United Hill People's Congress (Burmese: တောင်တန်းသားများ စည်းလုံးညီညွတ်ရေး ဦးစီးအဖွဲ့; UHPC) was a political party in Burma.

== History ==
The party was originally established as the Shan State People's Freedom League in 1945, being the Shan State branch of the Anti-Fascist People's Freedom League (AFPFL). Headed by U Htun Aye, the party was unpopular with Saophas. After they had accepted the inclusion of the Shan states in independent Burma, the Saophas joined the party, which was reorganised in 1947 to become the United Hill People's Congress, representing the traditional elite. Sao Shwe Thaik, later Burma's first president, was the new party's president. It contested the 1951–52 general elections as an AFPFL ally.

By the 1956 elections U Htun Aye had formed the Shan State Peasants' Organisation (SSPO), but the UHPC held 39 seats. It received 4.2% of the vote and was reduced to 14 seats, although it was the third largest party in the Chamber of Deputies; the SSPO won just two seats.

The party's popularity began to decrease as Shans became disenchanted with the government's policy towards them. The UHPO moved away from the AFPFL, although it remained in a coalition government with the ruling party. It contested the 1960 elections as an ally of the Clean faction of the AFPFL, receiving 1.1% of the vote as it was reduced to six seats.
