= Kayah Democratic League =

Former political party in Burma

The Kayah Democratic League was a political party in Burma.

== History ==
Established as an ally of the Stable AFPFL (the Kayah National United League allied itself with the Clean AFPFL), the party represented the Kayah of Karen and Shan states. In the 1960 general elections it won a single seat.
