= 1990 Myanmar general election =

- 27 May 1990 Annulled

All 492 seats in the Constitutional Committee 247 seats needed for a majority
- Turnout: 72.6%
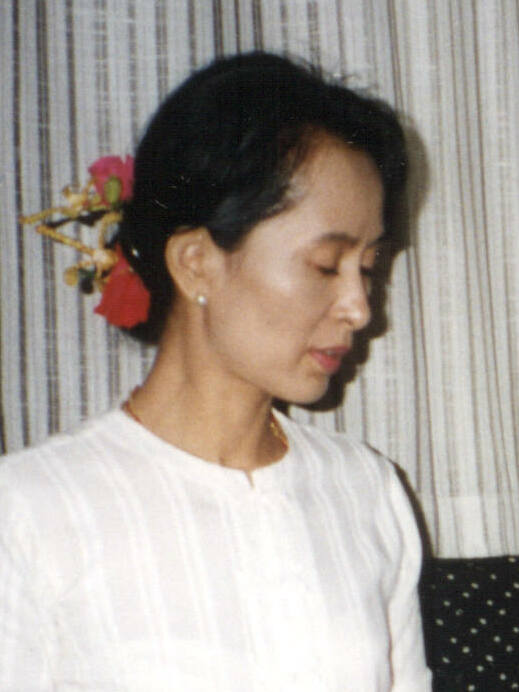
	First party	Second party	Third party
		NUP	SNLD
Leader	Aung San Suu Kyi	U Tha Gyaw	Khun Htun Oo
Party	NLD	NUP	SNLD
Seats won	392	10	23
Popular vote	7,943,622	2,805,559	222,821
Percentage	59.9%	21.2%	1.7%

General elections were held in Myanmar on 27 May 1990, the first multi-party elections since 1960, after which the country had been ruled by a military dictatorship. The elections were for a constitutional committee to draft a new constitution.

The result was a landslide victory for Aung San Suu Kyi's National League for Democracy (NLD), which won 392 of the 492 seats. However, the military junta refused to recognise the results and continued ruling the country until 2011. Voter turnout was 73%.

== Background ==
The aftermath of the uprising in 1988 and the rise of leader Aung San Suu Kyi placed worldwide media attention on the political situation in Myanmar. In September 1988, the State Law and Order Restoration Council (SLORC, the predecessor to the State Peace and Development Council), in its Declaration No. 1, had set four goals for the country: to maintain law and order, improve transportation, improve the humanitarian situation and hold multi-party elections. It also stated that the military would not "cling to power for long". Aung San Suu Kyi had been calling for dialogue between the SLORC and the citizens of Myanmar. In May 1989, the government reopened universities that had been involved in the uprising the previous year. At the same time, the government conceded and a date for the election was set for May 1990 with political parties registering for the election immediately. The date, 27 May 1990, was chosen for its auspicious nature surrounding the number 9; 27 May (2+7=9), and on the fourth Sunday of the fifth month (4+5=9).

== Parties and campaigning ==
93 political parties presented a total of 2,297 candidates to contest the 492 constituencies, with at least 2 candidates per constituency. Of the 93, 19 different ethnic parties also took part in the election. The National Unity Party (NUP) was favoured by the military to win. Aung San Suu Kyi, a popular opposition figure, ran against General Ne Win's largely disliked associate, Sein Lein. The symbol for the NUP was a sheaf of rice stalks, and the NLD's was a straw hat. Some people took to wearing rice stalks around their bare feet, a grave insult in a Buddhist country.

Although election campaigning was underway, the government placed restrictions on opposition politicians. U Aung Gyi, a former member of the junta, was expected to lead a weak coalition that would not challenge the interests of the army. He was imprisoned in 1988 for his outspoken views against the regime, but criticised Aung San Suu Kyi for being a "radical manipulated by Communists". Former Prime Minister U Nu remained under house arrest during the election process, as was Aung San Suu Kyi since 20 July 1989, without trial. Throughout campaigning, the government kept its restrictions on public gatherings and political meetings, and required all political literature to be approved by the SLORC prior to publication; however political parties defied the ruling. Two days before the election, visas for 61 foreign journalists were unexpectedly issued to cover the vote.

== Results ==
The National League for Democracy (NLD) won 392 of the 492 contested seats, which would have given it an overwhelming majority in the constitutional committee had it convened. The National Unity Party (NUP), which was favoured by the incumbent military junta, came second in terms of vote share with 21% of the vote and fourth in terms of seats, with only 10 seats in the chamber. The remaining seats in the chamber were won by a mixture of ethnic parties and independents.

Party	Votes	%	Seats
National League for Democracy	7,934,622	59.87	392
National Unity Party	2,805,559	21.17	10
Peasants National Unity Organisation (NUP)	300,906	2.27	0
League for Democracy and Peace	243,023	1.83	0
Shan Nationalities League for Democracy	222,821	1.68	23
Union National Democracy Party	196,518	1.48	1
Arakan League for Democracy	160,783	1.21	11
Workers Unity Organisation (NUP)	153,854	1.16	0
Mon National Democratic Front	138,572	1.05	5
National Democratic Party for Human Rights	128,129	0.97	4
Party for National Democracy	72,672	0.55	3
Youth Unity Organisation (NUP)	71,517	0.54	0
Democracy Party	63,815	0.48	1
Students and Youth League for Mayyu Development	57,088	0.43	0
Chin National League for Democracy	51,187	0.39	3
Democratic Front for National Reconstruction	38,203	0.29	0
Union Pa-O National Organisation	35,389	0.27	3
Arakan People's Democratic Front	29,115	0.22	0
Ta'ang National League for Democracy	23,975	0.18	2
Union Danu League for Democracy Party	23,145	0.17	1
Mro or Khami National Solidarity Organisation	22,778	0.17	1
Zomi National Congress	18,638	0.14	2
Democratic Organisation for Kayan National Unity	16,553	0.12	2
Union Karen League	16,518	0.12	0
Lahu National Development Party	15,796	0.12	1
Union of Burma (Main) AFPFL	14,443	0.11	0
Kachin State National Congress for Democracy	13,994	0.11	3
Kayah State Nationalities League for Democracy	11,664	0.09	2
Graduates and Old Students Democratic Association	10,634	0.08	1
Naga Hills Regional Progressive Party	10,612	0.08	2
Kamans National League for Democracy	10,596	0.08	1
Kachin State National Democratic Party	10,069	0.08	0
Lisu National Solidarity	9,397	0.07	0
United Nationalities League for Democracy	9,389	0.07	1
Kokang Democracy and Unity Party	9,085	0.07	0
Democratic Party for New Society	9,031	0.07	0
Arakan National Unity Organisation	8,663	0.07	0
Democratic League for the National Races of Shan State	7,210	0.05	0
Karen National Congress for Democracy	6,776	0.05	0
Karen State National Organisation	6,401	0.05	1
Kachin National Congress	6,304	0.05	0
Shan State Kokang Democratic Party	6,195	0.05	1
League of Peasants' Unions	6,037	0.05	0
Anti-Fascist People's Freedom League	6,029	0.05	0
Mara People's Party	5,873	0.04	1
Inn-Tha National Organisation	5,790	0.04	0
Farmer, Gadu Ganan and Shan National Unity Democratic Headquarters	5,257	0.04	0
Wa National Development Party	4,676	0.04	0
Democratic Human Rights Party	4,246	0.03	0
People's Democratic Party	4,242	0.03	0
National Peace and Democracy Party	3,988	0.03	0
Unity and Development Party	3,656	0.03	0
Free People League of Burma	2,959	0.02	0
Anti-Fascist People's Freedom League (Original)	2,882	0.02	0
Peasants' Development Party	2,847	0.02	0
People's Volunteer Organisation	2,696	0.02	0
Union for the Improvement of Burmese Women	2,495	0.02	0
Patriotic Old Comrades' League	2,435	0.02	1
All Burma National Progressive Democracy Party	2,249	0.02	0
League of Democratic Allies	2,114	0.02	0
Arakan Nationalities Democracy Party	2,033	0.02	0
Patriotic Democratic Youth Front	1,963	0.01	0
Rakhine National Humanitarian Development Organisation	1,942	0.01	0
People's Peasants Union	1,894	0.01	0
National Ethnic Reformation Party	1,782	0.01	0
Democratic Allies' League	1,619	0.01	0
Indigenous Collaboration Party	1,241	0.01	0
Might of New Generation Youth Front	1,224	0.01	0
Shan State Kachin Democratic Party	1,197	0.01	0
United League of Democratic Parties	1,174	0.01	0
United Trade Union Congress	1,128	0.01	0
National Progressive Youth of Myanmar Naing Ngan	1,013	0.01	0
National Peace Party	954	0.01	0
Leading Strength of National Realism Centre	928	0.01	0
Youths' Solidarity Front	860	0.01	0
Union People's Future and Democracy Party	848	0.01	0
All Burma Democratic People's Power Organisation	748	0.01	0
Democratic People's League	747	0.01	0
All Burma United Youths Organisation	640	0.00	0
Patriotic Youth Organisation	609	0.00	0
Union of Burma Unity Democracy League	604	0.00	0
United National Congress	575	0.00	0
Amyothar Party	523	0.00	0
Anti-Communist, Anti-Socialist, Anti-Totalitarian Free Democracy League	511	0.00	0
Union of Burma Democratic Front	414	0.00	0
Union of Kachin Youth	401	0.00	0
Democratic Labour Party	393	0.00	0
Shan National Democratic Development Party	366	0.00	0
National Politics Front (Youth)	354	0.00	0
Burma United Democratic Party	269	0.00	0
People's Power Party	158	0.00	0
Union Stability Party	86	0.00	0
People's Pioneer Party	70	0.00	0
Independents	152,228	1.15	6
Vacant			7
Total	13,253,606	100.00	492
Valid votes	13,253,606	87.70	
Invalid/blank votes	1,858,918	12.30	
Total votes	15,112,524	100.00	
Registered voters/turnout	20,818,313	72.59	
Source: Democratic Voice of Burma

== Aftermath ==
Initially, the SLORC said it would honour the results of the election. However, the government, surprised at the outcome, later annulled the results and many candidates were arrested or went into exile. Some later formed the National Coalition Government of the Union of Burma. Two months after the election, the SLORC issued Order 1/90, explaining it had legitimacy to rule as it was recognised by the United Nations and individual countries, as well as ensuring it would prevent the break-up of the Union. It required all parties to recognise and accept the Order, and many opposition figures who refused were arrested.
