= Patriotic Old Comrades' League =

The Patriotic Old Comrades' League (Burmese: မျိုးချစ် ရဲဘော်ဟောင်းများအဖွဲ့; POCL) was a political party in Myanmar.

== History ==
The POCL was formed by a group of former army members and veteran politicians at the height of the 8888 Uprising, and was a sister party of the National League for Democracy. It contested three seats in the 1990 general elections, winning one – Hla Maung in Kyain Seikgyi in Karen State.

The party was banned by the military government on 11 March 1992.
