= Karen State National Organisation =

Political party in Myanmar

The Karen State National Organisation (KSNA) was a political party in Myanmar.

== History ==
Following the reintroduction of multi-party democracy after the 8888 Uprising, the party contested three seats in the 1990 general elections. It received 0.05% of the vote, winning one seat; U Saw Tun Pe in Hlaingbwe.

The party was banned by the military government on 27 November 1991.
