= Burma Democratic Party =

Burmese political party

The Burma Democratic Party (Burmese: ဗမာပြည် ဒီမိုကရက်တစ် ပါတီ; BDP) was a political party in Burma.

== History ==
The party was established by Dobama Asiayone founder U Ba Sein in the early 1950s. The party had some support from Buddhist monks and, seeing itself as a right-wing alternative to the Anti-Fascist People's Freedom League, it joined the People's Democratic Front to contest 1951–52 general elections, with the alliance winning 19 seats.

It ran alone in the 1956 elections, but received just 2.9% of the vote and failed to win a seat. Its vote share fell to 0.1% in the 1960 elections, in which it again failed to enter Parliament.
