= Democratic Organisation for Kayan National Unity =

Political party in Myanmar

The Democratic Organisation for Kayan National Unity (Burmese: ကယန်းအမျိုးသားများ စည်းလုံးညီညွတ်ရေး ဒီမိုကရေစီအဖွဲ့; DOKNU) was a political party in Myanmar.

== History ==
Following the reintroduction of multi-party democracy after the 8888 Uprising, the party contested three seats in the 1990 general elections. It received 0.12% of the vote, winning two seats; U Khun Marko Ban in Pekhon and U R.P. Thaung in Thandaung.

The party was banned by the military government in 1992. Party members later established the Kayan National Party.
