= Kayah State Nationalities League for Democracy =

The Kayah State Nationalities League for Democracy (Burmese: ကယားပြည်နယ် လူမျိုးပေါင်းစုံ ဒီမိုကရေစီအဖွဲ့ချုပ်; KSNLD) was a political party in Myanmar.

== History ==
Following the reintroduction of multi-party democracy after the 8888 Uprising, the party contested eight seats in the 1990 general elections. It received 0.09% of the vote, winning two seats; U Khin Maung Cho in Dimawhso 1 and U Victor Lay in Dinawhso 2, both in Kayah State.

The party was banned by the military government on 18 March 1992.
