= Kachin National Congress =

The Kachin National Congress (Burmese: ကချင်အမျိုးသားများ ကွန်ဂရက်; KNC) was a political party in Burma.

== History ==
Allied with the Anti-Fascist People's Freedom League, the party won seven seats in the Chamber of Deputies in the 1951–52 elections. It was reduced to just two seats in the 1956 elections, but won three seats in the 1960 elections. It allied with the Stable AFPFL in the same year.

Following the restoration of multi-party democracy in the 1980s, a new Kachin National Congress was formed. It nominated five candidates for the 1990 general elections, but failed to win a seat.
