= Kamans National League for Democracy =

Political party representing the ethnic minority Kaman community of Myanmar

The Kamans National League for Democracy (Burmese: ကမန်အမျိုးသားဒီမိုကရေစီအဖွဲ့ချုပ်; KNLD) was a political party in Myanmar.

== History ==
Following the reintroduction of multi-party democracy after the 8888 Uprising, the party contested three seats in the 1990 general elections. It received 0.08% of the vote, winning one seat; U Shwe Ya in Akyab 1.

The party was banned by the military government on 11 March 1992.
