= Ta'ang National League for Democracy =

The Ta'ang National League for Democracy (Burmese: တအောင်း အမျိုးသား ဒီမိုကရေစီအဖွဲ့ချုပ်; TNLD) was a political party in Myanmar.

== History ==
Following the reintroduction of multi-party democracy after the 8888 Uprising, the party contested nine seats in the 1990 general elections. It received 0.2% of the vote, winning two seats; U Ai Yi in Kutkai 2 and U Tun Kyaw in Namhsan.

The party was banned by the military government on 13 February 1992.
