= Zomi Congress for Democracy =

Zomi Congress for Democracy ဇိုမီး ဒီမိုကရေစီအဖွဲ့ချုပ်
- Abbreviation: ZCD
- President: Pu Gin Kam Lian
- General Secretary: Pu Pau Lun Min Thang
- Founded: 1972 (India); 1988 (Myanmar)
- Headquarters: Pansodan Road, Kyauktada Township, Yangon
- Membership: 15,000
- Ideology: Zomi interests
- Colours: Red
- Seats in the Amyotha Hluttaw: 0 / 224
- Seats in the Pyithu Hluttaw: 1 / 440
- Seats in the Chin State Hluttaw: 1 / 24

Party flag

The Zomi Congress for Democracy (ZCD; Burmese: ဇိုမီး ဒီမိုကရေစီအဖွဲ့ချုပ်), formerly Zomi National Congress, is a political party in Myanmar. Originally formed in Manipur, India, most of its current support comes from Chin State, where the party was originally headquartered. The party is most popular in the Tonzang, Tedim, and Kale Townships where their headquarters and strongholds are. The party has 15,000 members in Chin State.

== History ==
The origins of the Zomi National Congress (ZNC) are in Manipur, India. T. Gougin founded the organisation in Daizang, Churachandpur district in 1972 to campaign for the unification of the Zomi people in India and Myanmar. He submitted a memorandum to the then President of India V. V. Giri. It was a major goal of ZNC to hold the first World Zomi Convention, which was eventually held at Champhai, Mizoram, India during 19–21 May 1988. Earlier in March 1988, T. Gougin joined forces with Brig. Sailo of the People's Conference of Mizoram to form a joint organisation called Zo-Reunification Organisation.

After the 8888 uprising in 1988, the ZNC branch in Burma was registered as a political party. It was permitted to function as a political organisation until 1992, when the military junta abolished the party and banned it from all political activities.

Cin Sian Thang was chairman of the Zomi National Congress until the party's dissolution. Elected as a Member of Parliament during Burma's ill-fated 1990 elections, he worked diligently for several years in defiance of the country’s ruling military junta. During the 1960s, Cin Sian Thang served as a leader of the Chin Ethnic Student Union while a student at Rangoon University. He has been imprisoned on at least six occasions by successive military regimes for his political activities between 1972 and 1999. In each instance, he served two years, during which he was subjected to brutal interrogations and torture, which led to permanent health problems. He also served as a member of the Committee Representing People’s Parliament, a group supported by 251 candidates elected in 1990. Considered a moderate ethnic leader, Cin Sian Thang heavily promoted the CRPP as a rallying point for Burmese activists and ethnic leaders. He was the most outspoken elected ethnic leader in Myanmar. He is also the co-author of the book "In Burma, a Cry for U.N. Help".

The party renamed to the Zomi Congress for Democracy after new naming restrictions imposed by the government leading up to the 2012 by-elections required them to drop the word 'National' from their name. The party formally registered this name with the Union Election Commission in 2012.
