= Zou people =

Ethnic group in Myanmar and northeast India

Zou people (Zou te)
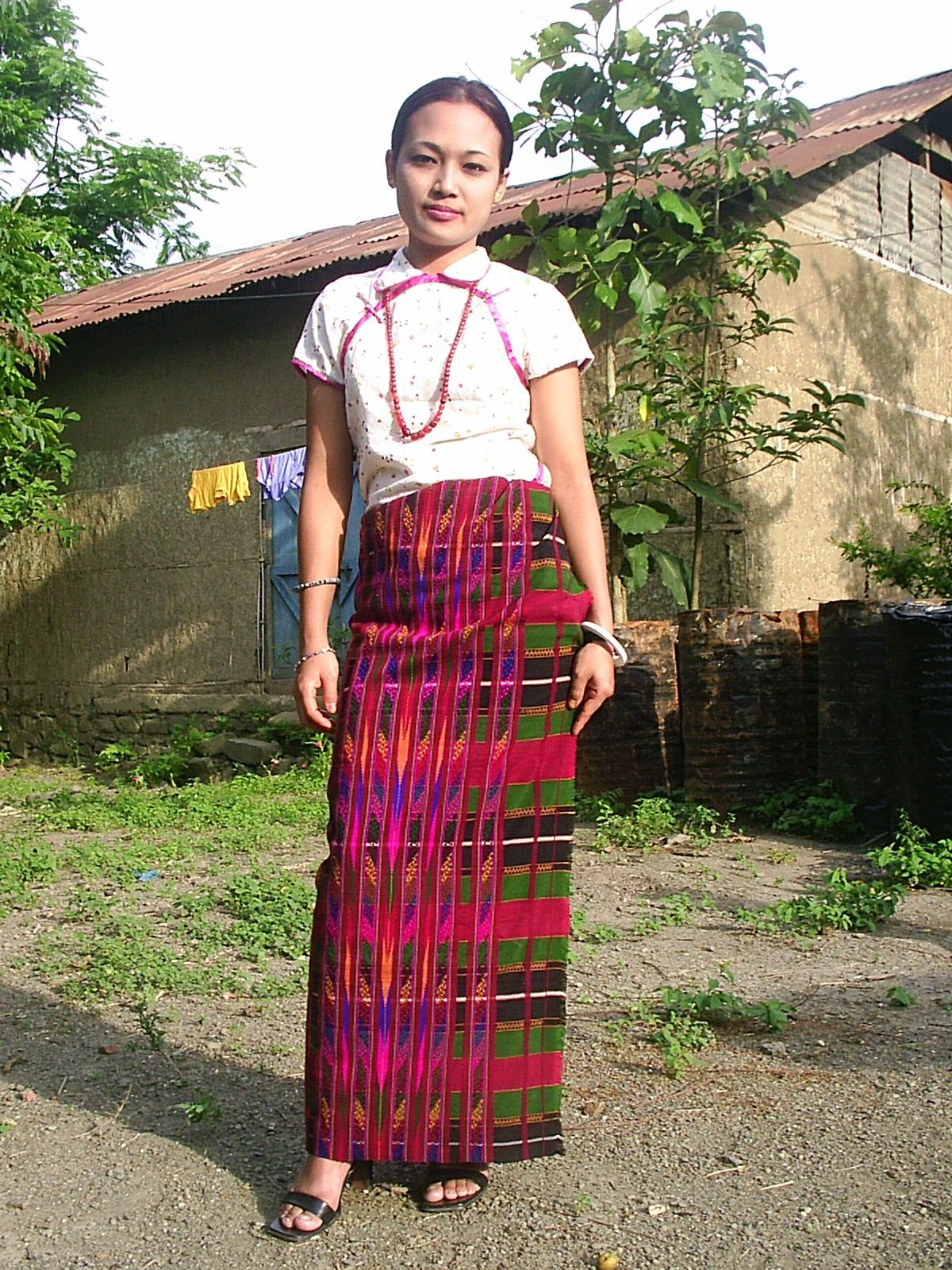
- A Zou girl in traditional costume

Regions with significant populations
- Chin State (Myanmar): Not stated
- Manipur (India): 26,545

Languages
- Zou language

Religion
- Majority: Christianity; Minority: Judaism, Hinduism, Islam, Jainism

Related ethnic groups
- Kuki; Paite; Simte; Tedim; Thadou

The Zou people (also spelled Zo, Yo, Jo or Jou) are an ethnic group indigenous to the India–Myanmar frontier. They are a subgroup of the Kuki-Chin-Mizo peoples. In India, they live alongside, and share cultural and linguistic similarities with the Thadou and Paites. In Myanmar (also known as Burma), the Zou are counted among the Chin peoples. They are a hill tribe; "Zou" may plainly mean "hills", denoting "people of the hills" or "of the hills." In the Zou language, however, "Zou" translates to "complete" or "finish." According to Zou folklore, the name "Zou" was inherited from an eponymous ancestor of the same name, who is believed to be the progenitor of the wider Kuki-Chin-Mizo peoples.

In India, the Zous are officially recognised as one of the thirty-three indigenous peoples within the state of Manipur, and are one of the Scheduled Tribes. According to the 2011 census, the Zou population in Manipur was 26,545. The community is concentrated in Churachandpur and Chandel districts of Manipur in Northeast India. The Zou people are predominantly Christian.

== History ==
=== Early history ===
The Zou trace their origin to a cave known as Khul, (Note: Also known as Chinlung, Chhinlung, Sinlung, Puk, Khurpui or Khur by neighboring tribes.) which is believed to be located in "the extreme north". Zou oral traditions trace descent to three ancestral brothers: Songthu (also known as Chongthu), Songza and Zahong. The Zou are believed to have reached Manipur earlier than the Paite but later than the Thadou. Some accounts suggest that they were originally a part of the Paite, becoming separated only toward the end of the British Raj.

Following an attack on the Phuaizang village by the Zou people under the Manlun clan, the Zou were pushed northwards by the Falam.

=== 1900–present ===
The Zou, alongside kindred tribes, participated in the Kuki Uprising (1917–1919), an anti-colonial revolt against British rule in Northeast India. Hiengtam and Gotengkot Forts were key centres of Zou resistance and battles. Gotengkot Fort was led by Pu Do Ngul Taithul, who emerged as a local chief and is noted for his opposition and clashes against Captain Steadman, who was tasked with suppressing the fort.

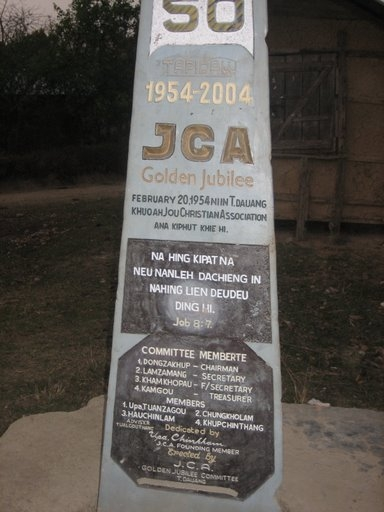
JCA jubilee monument at Daizang village

In early 1920, Pi Lam Za Vung of Phaitu Village, Chin State, Myanmar was converted to Christianity by Evangelist Hat Go and became, according to Esther Lalnunmawii, the first documented Christian convert among the Zou. While neighbouring tribal communities embraced Christianity, the Zou, alongside the Simte, largely continued to practise the traditional Sakhua (also called Lawki) religion and were among the last groups in the region to widely convert. On 20 February 1954, a group of Zou youth organised the first Jou Christian Association (JCA) Conference at Daizang village, Manipur. The conference marked the start of a local social movement, which played a significant role in the widespread conversion to Christianity among the Zou. Rev. Roberts' The North East India General Mission established churches within the Zou community. Christian missionaries also introduced them to formal education.

India officially recognised the Zou in 1956 as one of the 29 Scheduled Tribes of Manipur.

In 1961, a group within the Zou community in Chandel district of Manipur adopted a distinct Baite identity and formed the Baite Organisation. They identify as part of the Naga peoples.

In August 2024, the Zou Civil Society Organizations (CSOs) protested against the ongoing India–Myanmar border fencing project for its perceived disregard of indigenous rights and "lack of transparency".

== Culture ==
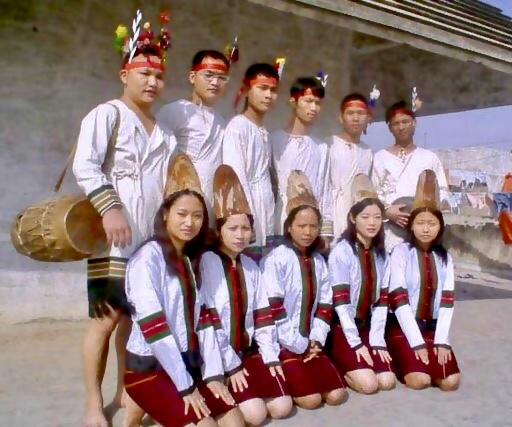
Zou cultural troupe in full traditional attire

=== Gender roles ===
Zou society maintains its patriarchal structure. Within the family, the husband serves as the head of the household and daughters leave their natal family upon marriage. Inheritance follows a patrilineal system, with the eldest son entitled to inherit his father’s properties after his death; the father may also choose to distribute property among other sons before his passing.

Historian Frederick S. Downs has noted that, despite advances in secular education and employment, women’s status within the church changed only gradually. The proportion of women within salaried jobs in Zou churches is cited at approximately 3%. Women are encouraged to participate in fundraising projects.

=== Hunting ===
Most Zou hunters use a gun known as Zouthau. During group hunts, the first person to wound the animal is entitled to the heads of all other animals taken in the hunt. When dangerous animals such as tigers are killed, the entire village gathers to perform traditional victory songs and the sa-ai ritual, which involves the ceremonial killing of tamed animals, usually pigs, accompanied by the drinking of traditional wine (zu). After the ritual, the animal is skinned and its carcass is buried. Today, this practice is very rare.

Historically, the Zou engaged in headhunting.

=== Marriage ===
Marriage among the Zou is patrilocal, monogamous, and typically, but not exclusively, exogamous. They traditionally practise patrilineal cross-cousin marriage and pay a bride price. In cases of divorce, the spouse at fault is required to pay fines in the form of money and customary services. Marriage practices are now governed by the church.

=== Music ===
Khuang, a traditional drum made of wood and animal skin, plays an integral part in Zou church music.

A Zou folk song composed during the Kuki Uprising reads as follows:

Tuizum Mangkang kiil bang hing khang
Zota kual zil bang liing e
Pianna ka gamlei hi e! phal sing e!
Ka naamtem hiam a, i Zogamlei lal kanaw
Sansii'n zeel e!
Ngalliam vontawi ka laulou lai e. (Note: Translation: The seafaring White imperialist coils like the 'kiil' [cactus] plant, Tremors of earthquakes do quiver the Zo world, 'Tis the land of my birth: I shall not part with it! Stain’d with blood is my sword That has rooted the adversaries of Zoland, I shall yet fight with the wild boar, injured.)

=== Religion ===
Historically, Zou people followed Sakhua—also known as Lawki in the Chin Hills—which included the belief in natural spirits and ancestor worship. It is similar to Mizo Sakhua.

In the 20th century, Zou people began converting to Christianity, which today constitutes the majority faith. Missionaries repurposed elements of Sakhua vocabulary for use in Bible translations and hymnals, such as the word Pasian being used in reference to the Christian God.

== Language ==
Zou is part of the Kuki-Chin language family. According to Ethnologue, there are 20,900 speakers in India (based on the 2001 Indian census) and around 61,000 speakers in Myanmar (2012). Zou is primarily written in Roman script and is similar to the Paite language. Zou is one of the prescribed Major Indian Languages in Manipur high schools.

=== Dialect standardisation ===
Scholars have noted that Bible translations into the tribal languages of northeast India contributed to dialectal standardisation. The Zou language itself constitutes several dialects including Haidawi, Khuangnung, Thangkhal, Khodai and Tungkua. Haidawi became the dominant literary dialect through its use in vernacular Bibles and hymnals, Khuangnung is used among urban speakers and Thangkhal influenced traditional folk songs. The recognition of Zou as a Major Indian Language by the government of Manipur further contributed to demand for a standardised Zou dialect.

== Bibliography ==
- Chinlunthang; L, Peter (2017). A History of the Zou People. UZO-India publication.
- Paullanding, Reuben; Ngaihte, Samuel G (2022). Christianity and Empire in South Manipur Hills: Senvon Encounter and the Dialogic Zo Peoples. ISBN 978-1506488929.
- Kamkhenthang, H. (1988). The Paite, a Transborder Tribe of India and Burma. Mittal Publications. ISBN 9788170990703.
- Sen, Sipra (1992). Tribes and castes of Manipur: description and select bibliography. Mittal. ISBN 978-81-7099-310-0.
- Downs, Frederick S. (1996). The Christian Impact on the Status of Women in North East India. NEHU Publications.
- Mandal, Hrisikesh; Mukherjee, Sumit; Datta, Archana (2002). India, an Illustrated Atlas of Tribal World. Anthropological Survey of India Calcutta, Ministry of Tourism and Culture, Department of Culture, Government of India. ISBN 978-81-85579-65-8.
- Lisam, Khomdan Singh (2011). Encyclopaedia of Manipur. Gyan Publishing House. ISBN 9788178358642.
- Zou, David Vumlallian (2009). "The Pasts of a fringe Community: Ethno-history and fluid identity of the Zou in Manipur". Indian Historical Review. 36 (2): 209–235. doi:10.1177/037698360903600202.
- Sarma, Pradip Chandra (2002). Traditional Customs and Rituals of Northeast India: Arunachal Pradesh, Meghalaya, Manipur, Assam. Vivekananda Kendra Institute of Culture.
- Goswami, B. B. (1979). The Mizo Unrest (PDF). Aalekh.
- Alam, Arshad (2023). Religion and Education in India. Taylor & Francis. ISBN 9781000991147.
- Khual, Gin Khan (2021). "Indigenous Hunting Practices: Changes and Continuity Among the Zou Of Manipur, Northeast India". Man, Environment and Society. 2 (1). ISSN 2582-7669.
- Singh, K. S. (1994). "The Scheduled Tribes". People of India. 3. ISBN 0195632559.
- Zou, David Vumlallian (2010). "A Historical Study of the 'Zo Struggle'". Economic and Political Weekly. 45 (14).
- Go, Khup Za (1996). A Critical Historical Study of Bible Translations Among the Zou People in North East India. Chin Baptist Literature Board.
