= Burma Socialist Party =

Burma Socialist Party ဗမာပြည် ဆိုရှယ်လစ်ပါတီ
- Abbreviation: BSP; PF(S)P ဖဆဆိုရှယ်
- President: Ba Swe
- Founded: 1945
- Dissolved: 1964
- Preceded by: People's Revolutionary Party
- Newspaper: The Socialist Front Weekly Journal
- Membership (1956): 6,000
- Ideology: Socialism
- Political position: Left-wing
- National affiliation: Anti-Fascist People's Freedom League
- International affiliation: Asian Socialist Conference

The Burma Socialist Party (Burmese: ဗမာပြည် ဆိုရှယ်လစ်ပါတီ), initially known as the People's Freedom (Socialist) Party or PF(S)P, was a political party in Burma. It was the dominant party in Burmese politics after 1948, and the dominant political force inside the Anti-Fascist People's Freedom League (AFPFL - ဖဆပလ). Because of its inclusion in AFPFL, it was colloquially known as ဖဆဆိုရှယ် (AF Social).

The party was a successor to the wartime People's Revolutionary Party (ပြည်သူ့အရေးတော်ပုံပါတီ) and founded by Ba Swe, Kyaw Nyein and five others in order to counter the influence of the Communist Party of Burma within the AFPFL and to prevent a communist take-over of the umbrella organization. For the same reason, to counter the communist All Burma Trade Union Congress, the socialists also launched the Trade Union Congress (Burma) in November 1945. Before the foundation of the PF(S)P, the communists had openly emerged as a bloc inside AFPFL. The ideological rivalry extended to the politicized military. Non-communists within the military supported the build-up of the socialist party as a counter force since many communists most prominently Kyaw Zaw were also in leading positions within the military.

In 1945, Thakin Mya became the chairman of the party. Ba Swe served as general secretary and Kyaw Nyein as joint secretary. In 1947, after Thakin Mya was murdered alongside Aung San, Ko Ko Gyi became the new party chairman in July 1947. In the summer of 1948, he was asked to resign from his positions in both the party and government. After his resignation, Ko Ko Gyi joined the underground insurgency. The post of chairman was abolished and the party was from then on led by Ba Swe and Kyaw Nyein.

In 1948 the name of the party was changed to 'Burma Socialist Party'. In 1949, it became the 'Union of Socialist Party'. From 1950 onwards it was again called the 'Burma Socialist Party'. The party published The Socialist Front Weekly Journal.

The party initially relied on support from affiliated mass organizations such as the Workers' Asiayone, Peasants' Asiayone, Women's Asiayone, etc. After 1950, the party developed more into a cadre party but retained strong links to the Trade Union Congress (Burma).

In December 1950 the left-wing faction of the party broke away and formed the Burma Workers and Peasants Party. The membership of the Burma Socialist Party is estimated to have dropped from around 2,000 to just 200 as a consequence of the split. The party recovered and its membership was estimated of having reached 6,000 in 1956.

In 1964 the party was banned by decree of the Union Revolutionary Council led by Ne Win.
