= Burma Workers Party =

- Leader: Thakin Chit Maung, Thakin Lwin
- Founded: 1950
- Dissolved: 1962
- Membership (1957): 3000
- Ideology: Communism; Marxism-Leninism
- Political position: Far-left

The Burma Workers Party, until 1958 the Burma Workers and Peasants Party, was a communist party in Burma, formed on 8 December 1950 by leftist elements of the Socialist Party. In December 1962 it merged with the People's Comrade Party to form the United Workers Party. In March 1964, it was among the many parties banned by decree of the Revolutionary Council.

== History ==
The founders of the BWPP were 42 leading cadres of the Socialist Party, who denounced the leadership of Ba Swe and Kyaw Nyein. These included Thakin Chit Maung, Thakin Hla Kywe, Thakin Lwin and U Ba Nyein. Within the Socialist Party discussions had emerged on issues like the affiliation of the Trade Union Congress (Burma) to the World Federation of Trade Unions. Under the leadership of Thakin Lwin, the TUC(B) had steered towards an openly communist line. In the May Day rally of 1950, TUC(B) demonstrators had carried large portraits of Karl Marx, Friedrich Engels, Vladimir Lenin, Joseph Stalin and Mao Zedong. Thakin Lwin had publicly declared that TUC(B) followed the 'communist party line', but denounced the White Flag Communist Party, Red Flag Communist Party and Josip Broz Tito as 'deviationists'. Except for Thakin Lwin, a major leader amongst the founders of the BWPP was Thakin Chit Maung who was a leader of the All Burma Peasants Organisation. The BWPP formed a new trade union centre, the Burma Trade Union Congress (BTUC).

The BWPP was a Marxist–Leninist party. It considered the AFPFL government as servants of imperialism. However, unlike the White Flag and Red Flag communist parties the BWPP worked as a legal political parties. The party was sometimes nicknamed as 'Red Socialists'.

At the time of its foundation, the party had ten MPs amongst its members. In the 1951 election, the strength of the BWPP parliamentary faction increased to twelve. Ahead of the 1956 legislative election, the BWPP launched the National United Front in 1955. In the elections the NUF won 48 seats.

In June 1957 Prime Minister U Nu made a deal with the BWPP to be able to defeat a no confidence vote in the parliament.

The first party congress of the BWPP has held in Rangoon 27 December 1957 – 2 January 1958, during which the name 'Burma Workers Party' was adopted. At the congress 259 delegates, representing 22 districts and around 3000 party members, were present. The congress adopted five main slogans: "(1) One party our strength, one party our aim!; (2) Let us separate ourselves from Capitalists and their like; Let us form alliance with those who are true to us and our Cause!; (3) Let us define our political aim clearly and keep Democracy in view!; (4) Internal Peace through Democracy!; (5) Afro-Asian Alliance for world peace!"

The congress elected various leadership committees:

- Politburo: Thakin Chit Maung, Thakin Lwin, U Ba Nyein, Boh Mya Thway, Thakin Ba Han, Aung Ban.
- Party Unification Commission: Thakin Hla Kyway, Sein Mya, Than (Prome), Than Myint, Tin Tun.
- Propaganda Commission: Thakin Lu Aye, Thu, Thakin Aye-Che, Than Lay, Aung Than.
- Treasury Commission: Thakin Ba Han, Thakin Lay Maung, Thakin Than.

After the declaration of 'Burmese Way to Socialism' by the Ne Win regime, the BWP was marginalised. At the end of 1962, the BWP and the People's Comrade Party merged into the United Workers Party.
