= Union Parliament =

Parliament of Burma, 1952–1962

Union Parliament ပြည်ထောင်စုပါလီမန် Pyidaungzu Parliman
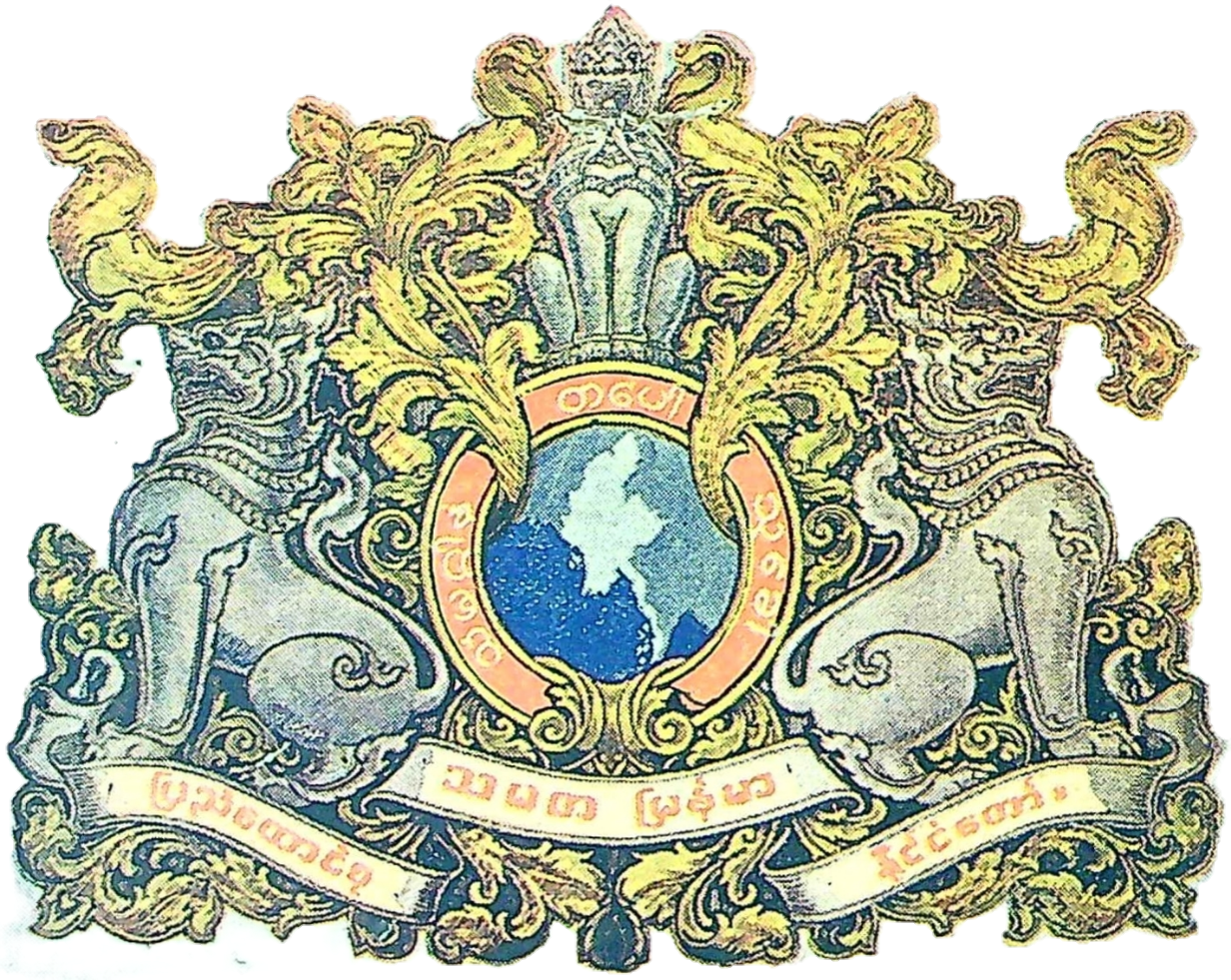

Type
- Type: Bicameral
- Houses: Chamber of Nationalities; Chamber of Deputies

History
- Founded: 1952
- Disbanded: 1962
- Preceded by: Constituent Assembly of Burma (1947–1948; serving as Provisional Parliament in 1948–1952)
- Succeeded by: Pyithu Hluttaw (1974–1988)

Elections
- Last Chamber of Nationalities election: 1960
- Last Chamber of Deputies election: 1960

The Union Parliament (Burmese: ပြည်ထောင်စုပါလီမန်) or simply Parliament (ပါလီမန်) (Note: The original 1947 Constitution called it "ပြည်ထောင်စုပါလီမန်" in Burmese and "Union Parliament" in English, but the president of the Constituent Assembly removed the words "ပြည်ထောင်စု" and "Union" using the amending power given to him.) was the bicameral legislature of the Union of Burma from 1952 (Note: Act of Salaries of the Speakers and Deputy Speakers of the Chamber of Nationalities and the Speakers and Deputy Speakers of the Chamber of Deputies of the Union Parliament, 1952. [Act No. I of 1952]: 1. This Act shall come into force on the day of the first session of the first Parliament convened under Chapter 6 of the Constitution....: 5. The Constituent Assembly (Salaries of the Speaker and the Deputy Speaker) Act, 1948 (Act No. III of 1948) is repealed.; Effective date shown on the Myanmar Law Information System: 3.3.1952) to 1962, when it was disbanded by the Revolutionary Council of the Union of Burma. It consisted of an upper house, the Chamber of Nationalities and a lower house, the Chamber of Deputies. Before the first Union Parliament was elected and assembled according to the constitution, the Constituent Assembly of Burma served as the Provisional Parliament.

From 1957 to 1963, the Union Parliament was a member of the Inter-Parliamentary Union (IPU).

== Powers and Responsibilities ==
The Union Parliament of Burma had the following powers under the 1947 Constitution of Burma:

- Legislation for Ministerial Burma - Under the 1947 Constitution, Burma was split between "Burma Proper" or "Ministerial Burma" and several states, such as Shan State. This arrangement made the Union Parliament responsible for legislating for Burma Proper itself.
- Electing the President - The President of Burma was elected by both chambers of the Union Parliament, the 125 seat Chamber of Nationalities, and the 250 seat Chamber of Deputies.
