= 1956 Burmese general election =

- 27 April 1956

202 of the 250 seats in the Chamber of Deputies 126 seats needed for a majority
- Turnout: 47.8%
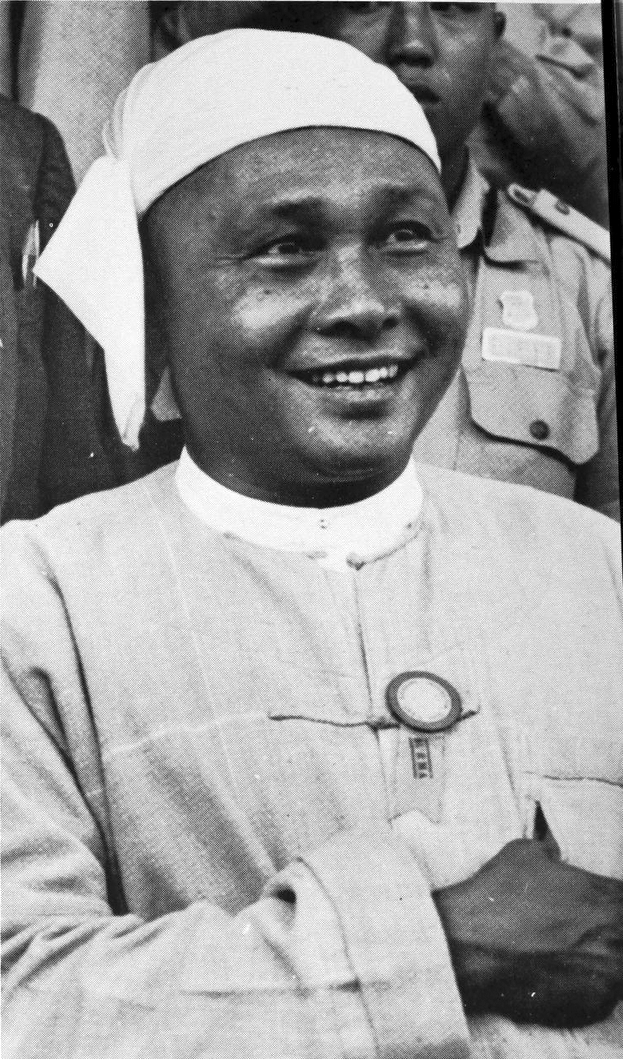

	First party	Second party
Leader	U Nu
Party	AFPFL	NUF
Seats won	147	48
Seat change	▼52	▲29
Popular vote	1,844,614	1,170,073
Percentage	47.76%	30.3
Prime Minister before election
U Nu
AFPFL
Prime Minister-elect
Ba Swe
AFPFL

General elections were held in Burma on 27 April 1956 to elect the 250 members of the Burmese Chamber of Deputies. However, voting did not take place for 48 seats in which the Anti-Fascist People's Freedom League (AFPFL) candidates ran unopposed.

The AFPFL, a former wartime resistance organisation, won the elections with a reduced majority. After the election, U Nu, leader of the AFPFL, temporarily retired to reform the party and its policies.

The second part of the election to elect members to the Chamber of Nationalities took place on 22 May after the election commission stated that "rebel intimidation and the lack of security prevented the people from exercising freedom of choice". Voter turnout was 48%.

== Campaign ==
The AFPFL, National United Front (NUF) and smaller parties participated in the election. The NUF was successful in gaining media attention and organising trade union and peasant organisations. However, the AFPFL was concerned at alleged funding by foreign embassies of the NUF. A number of smaller parties represented different ethnic groups and were more local than national. Meanwhile, U Nu of the AFPFL advocated his long held policy of neutrality.

== Conduct ==
After identifying themselves and voting, voters would dip their forefinger in green indelible ink. Opposition parties complained of minor irregularities regarding election lists. Due to the security situation, the army was told to ensure free and fair elections but not to intimidate voters. Students in the capital Rangoon had threatened to cause disorder after one of their leaders was killed by police, however this did not materialise.

== Results ==
Party	Votes	%	Seats	+/–
Anti-Fascist People's Freedom League	1,844,614	47.76	147	–52
National United Front	1,170,073	30.30	48	+29
United Hill People's Congress	163,283	4.23	14	–
Burma Democratic Party	113,091	2.93	0	–
Burma Nationalist Party	77,364	2.00	1	New
People's Educational and Cultural Development Organisation	49,203	1.27	4	New
All-Shan State Organisation	41,940	1.09	4	New
Arakanese National Unity Organisation	38,939	1.01	5	New
Shan State Peasants' Organisation	31,112	0.81	2	New
Kachin National Congress	30,837	0.80	2	–5
United National Pa-O Organisation	22,185	0.57	1	–2
Other parties	40,405	1.05	0	–
Independents	239,166	6.19	13	–2
Vacant			9	–
Total	3,862,212	100.00	250	0
Total votes	4,100,000	–		
Registered voters/turnout	8,570,308	47.84		
Source: Silverstein, Nohlen et al.
