= 1960 Burmese general election =

- 6 February 1960

All 250 seats in the Chamber of Deputies 126 seats needed for a majority
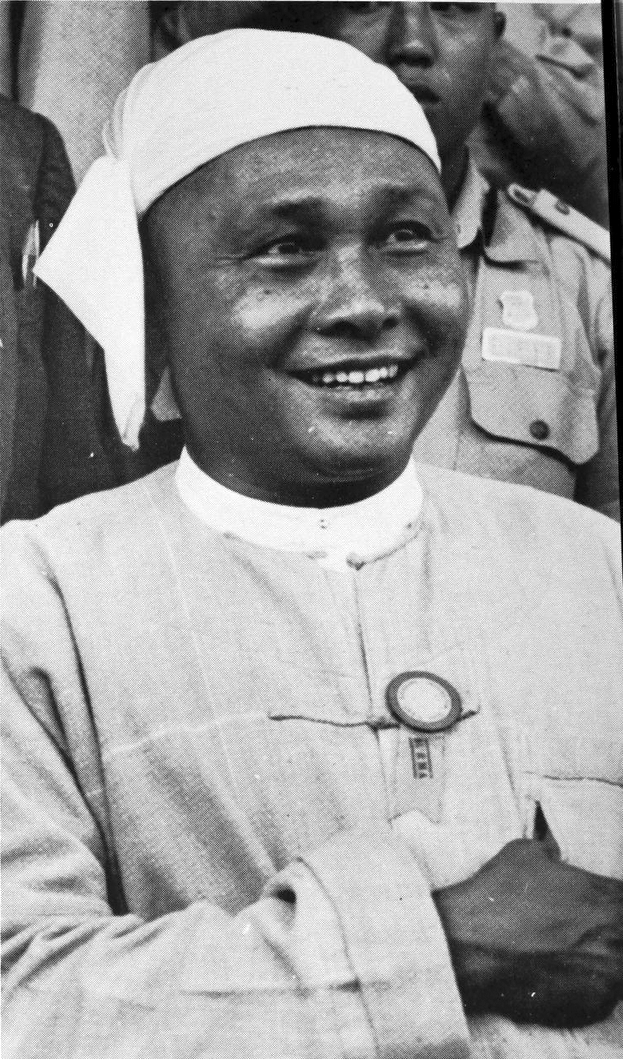

	First party	Second party	Third party
Leader	U Nu	Kyaw Nyein & Ba Swe
Party	Clean AFPFL	Stable AFPFL	NUF
Seats won	158	41	3
Seat change	New	New	▼45
Prime Minister before election
Ne Win
Military
Prime Minister-elect
U Nu
AFPFL

General elections were held in Burma on 6 February 1960 to install a government to take over from General Ne Win's interim administration, established in October 1958. The military-led administration was credited for bringing stability and improving infrastructure in the country, though it suppressed some civil liberties.

The elections were seen as not so much a contest between the Clean AFPFL of U Nu against the Stable AFPFL of Kyaw Nyein and Ba Swe, but a referendum on the policies of the interim military government between 1958 and 1960. The result was a victory for the Clean AFPFL, which won 157 of the 250 seats in the Chamber of Deputies.

The elections set a precedent to other Middle Eastern and South Asian leaders, where the military voluntarily handed over to a civilian government and held free elections. However, only two years after his election victory, U Nu was overthrown in a coup d'état led by General Ne Win on 2 March 1962.

== Campaign ==
The Clean AFPFL, led by U Nu, and Stable AFPFL, led by U Kyaw Nyein and U Ba Swe, had been formed after a split in the main AFPFL party in June 1958. Until the military took over in October 1958, U Nu relied on the communists to retain a majority in parliament.

Despite the formation of the two parties, there were no major ideological differences between them and their policies were similar, especially with regards to non-alignment, although the Stable faction favoured industrialisation and the Clean faction spoke more of agricultural development. The Stable faction had given the impression it was favoured by the army, but, after realising the army was not as favoured as first thought, distanced itself. It had also argued it represented stability. Meanwhile, the "Clean" faction warned against the "dangers of fascist dictatorship", and criticised the current leaders for their "drinking and womanising". The communist NUF was severely repressed by the caretaker military government and was therefore outside the two main parties.

The Clean AFPFL chose yellow to campaign, as it was the colour worn by monks, while the Stable AFPFL chose red and the National United Front chose blue.

== Conduct ==
An estimated 10,000,000 Burmese were eligible to vote. The military largely stayed away on voting day, although it was present at some ballot boxes. Boxes for the "Clean" faction featured pictures of U Nu which the "Stable" faction and other smaller parties alleged confused the voter into thinking they were voting for Nu personally. Polls closed at 6 pm and a crowd estimated at 20,000 gathered at the Sule Pagoda in the capital Rangoon to hear results as they were posted. The "Clean" faction took all 9 seats in the capital including one they were prepared to concede, while the "Stable" faction had some strength in the countryside.

Media coverage of the event was restricted to print media only and vigorously covered, but was largely ignored by the state-run Burma Broadcasting Service which had not aired opposition coverage since before the AFPFL split.

== Results ==
Voter turnout was the highest in a Burmese election. U Nu, remarking on his victory, said "I guess people like us".

=== Chamber of Deputies ===
Party	Votes	%	Seats	+/–
Clean AFPFL			158	New
Stable AFPFL			41	New
National United Front			3	–45
Arakanese National Unity Organisation			6	0
Shan State United Hill People's Organisation			6	–8
Kachin National Congress			3	+1
Mon National Front			3	New
People's Educational and Cultural Development Organisation			2	–2
Chin National Organisation			1	New
Kayah National United League			1	New
Kayah Democratic League			1	New
All Nationalist Alliance			0	New
All-Shan State Organisation			0	–4
Buddhist Democratic Party			0	New
Burma Democratic Party			0	0
Burma Nationalist Party			0	–1
Independents and other parties			10	–
Vacant			15	–
Total			250	0
Total votes	6,000,000	–		
Registered voters/turnout	10,000,000	60.00		
Source: Butwell & Von der Mehden, Nohlen et al.

=== Chamber of Nationalities ===
Party	Seats
Clean AFPFL	53
Stable AFPFL	29
Minority parties	43
Total	125
Source: Nohlen et al.
