= Chamber of Deputies (Burma) =

Lower house of the Union Parliament of Burma from 1952 to 1962

Chamber of Deputies ပြည်သူ့လွှတ်တော် Pyithu Hluttaw

Type
- Type: Lower house of the Union Parliament

History
- Founded: 1952
- Disbanded: 1962
- Preceded by: Constituent Assembly of Burma (1947-1948; serving as Provisional Parliament in 1948-1952)
- Succeeded by: Pyithu Hluttaw (1974-1988)
- Seats: 250

Elections
- Last election: 1960

Meeting place
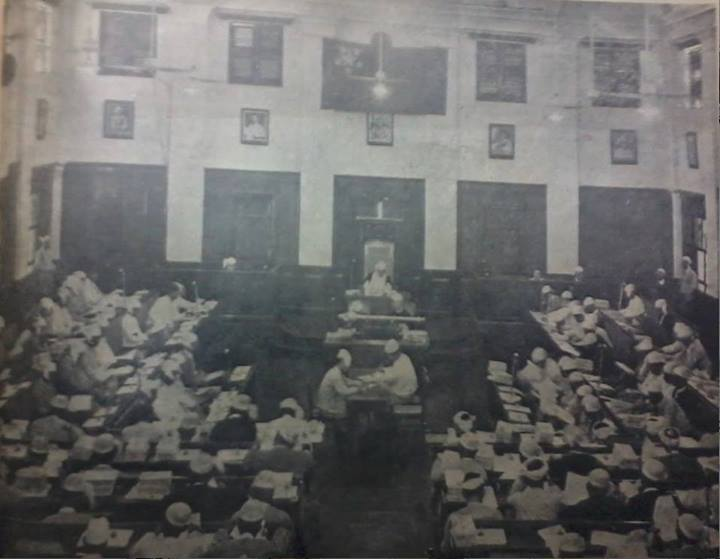
- Government Secretariat, Rangoon

The Chamber of Deputies (Burmese: ပြည်သူ့လွှတ်တော်, lit. 'People's Assembly') was the lower house of the bicameral Union Parliament of Burma (Myanmar) from 1952 (Note: Act of Salaries of the Speakers and Deputy Speakers of the Chamber of Nationalities and the Speakers and Deputy Speakers of the Chamber of Deputies of the Union Parliament, 1952. [Act No. I of 1952]: 1. This Act shall come into force on the day of the first session of the first Parliament convened under Chapter 6 of the Constitution....: 5. The Constituent Assembly (Salaries of the Speaker and the Deputy Speaker) Act, 1948 (Act No. III of 1948) is repealed.; Effective date shown on the Myanmar Law Information System: 3.3.1952) to 1962. Under the 1947 Constitution, bills initiated and passed by the lower house, the Chamber of Deputies, were to be sent to the Chamber of Nationalities for review and revision. Before the first session of the bicameral Union Parliament was elected and assembled according to the constitution, the Constituent Assembly of Burma served as the Provisional Parliament.

The Chamber of Deputies was constitutionally allocated twice the number of seats compared to the Chamber of Nationalities.

The parliament was dissolved on 3 March 1962 following a coup.

== Speakers of the Chamber of Deputies ==
Name	Took office	Left office	Notes
U Mya	4 January 1948	December 1953	
Bo Hmu Aung	23 February 1954	16 July 1958	
U Tin	31 October 1958	4 April 1960	
Mahn Ba Saing	4 April 1960	1961 - ?	
