= U Thant funeral crisis =

Protests and riots in Burma

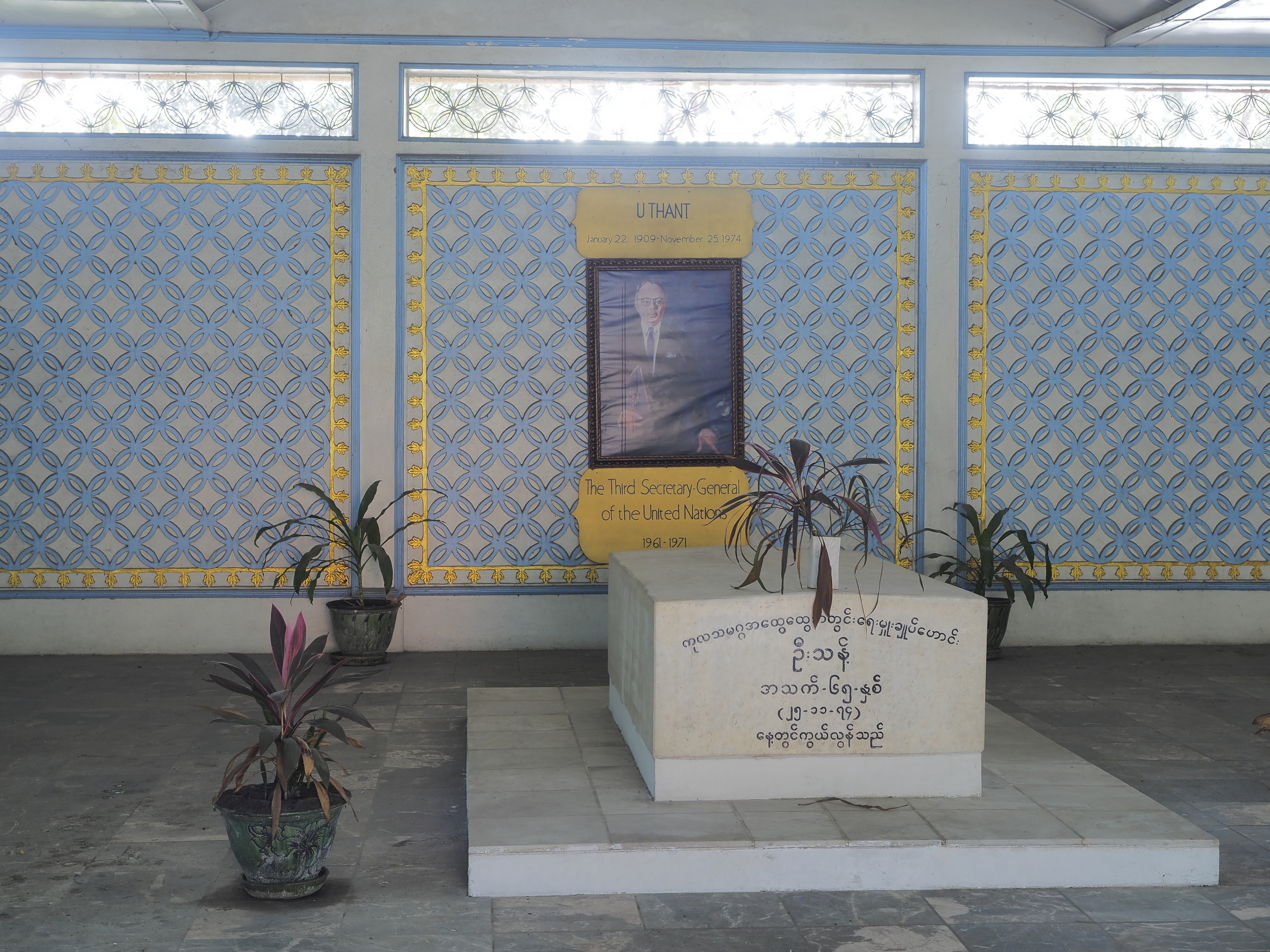
- Final resting place of U Thant
- Date: 1 December 1974 – 11 December 1974
- Location: Rangoon, Socialist Republic of the Union of Burma (modern Yangon, Myanmar)
- Caused by: Government's refusal to hold a state funeral for U Thant
- Goals: State funeral at the old site of Rangoon University Student Union
- Methods: Civil resistance, demonstrations, nonviolent resistance
- Result: Government crackdown: Riots violently suppressed; Public funeral at Kandawmin Garden

Casualties
- Death: Unknown
- Injuries: Unknown
- Arrested: Unknown

The U Thant funeral crisis or U Thant crisis (Burmese: ဦးသန့် အရေးအခင်း) was a series of protests and riots in the then-Burmese capital of Rangoon triggered by the death of U Thant, the third Secretary-General of the United Nations on 25 November 1974.

In response to the Burmese military government's refusal to give him a state funeral, student activists from the Rangoon Arts and Sciences University (RASU) took his body away from the official funeral procession and marched it to the university campus where they held their own ceremony for him. The students, Thant's family, and the government came to an agreement to bury the body in a new mausoleum next to the Shwedagon Pagoda, but before this could happen, another group of student activists took the body to a mausoleum they had constructed at the site of the demolished RASU Students Union building. On 11 December, the government stormed the university grounds, seized the body, and entombed it at the Kandawmin Garden Mausolea.

Citywide riots followed this crackdown, and the government declared martial law. Peace returned to the city by 15 December after the army cracked down on the rioters and protesters. According to official sources, thousands of protesters were arrested and at least eighteen died, but unofficial figures are much higher.

== Background ==
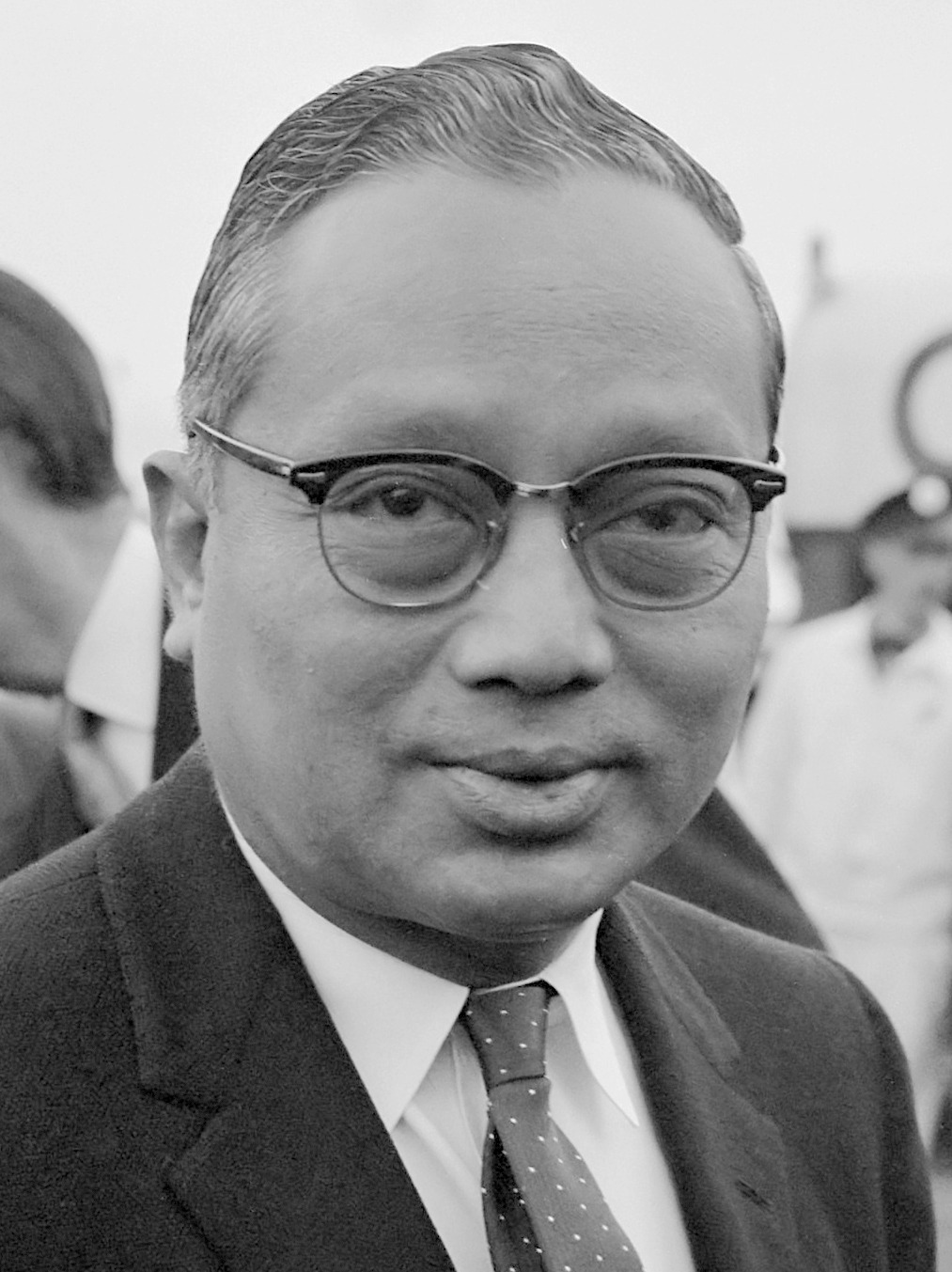
U Thant, the third Secretary-General of the United Nations from 1961 to 1971

=== About U Thant ===
Before holding the role of UN Secretary-General from 1961 to 1971, Thant was a civil servant under the administration of U Nu, the first prime minister of Burma. As the Secretary of Projects for the Prime Minister's office, Thant accompanied Nu on several official trips overseas. Thant also represented Burma at the 1952 UN General Assembly and the 1955 Bandung Conference in Indonesia. In 1957, he became Burma's Permanent Representative to the United Nations. When Secretary-General Dag Hammarskjöld was killed in a plane crash in 1961, Thant was appointed acting Secretary-General for the remainder of Hammarskjöld's term. His term was extended in 1962 to five years from the day he took office, and he stood unopposed for a second term in 1966.

In December 1971, Thant stepped down after being hospitalised for a bleeding ulcer. Remaining in New York, he became a Senior Fellow at the Adlai Stevenson Institute of International Affairs and was awarded the UN Peace Medal in 1972. On 25 November 1974, he died of complications from cancer.

=== Political and economic context ===
Thant's death occurred only two years after a transition of Ne Win's Burma Socialist Programme Party (BSPP) government from military to ostensible civilian rule, and the same year that it adopted a new constitution. Commentator Raja Arumugam argues that the transition was simply a "change of garb", and that Ne Win and his senior commanders merely retired from the army and became civilian government leaders. Moreover, as he contends, the implementation of the new constitution only legitimized the consolidation of military power through the BSPP.

Against the backdrop of these political developments, popular discontent against the government grew due to high prices and food shortages. Additionally, rice production along the Irrawaddy River declined due to intense monsoon rains and flooding. These economic and political conditions cumulated in workers' strikes in May and June 1974, as well as subsequent rioting and a violent crackdown. According to Burma scholar Andrew Selth:

The public anger aroused by the savage response to these disturbances was soon aggravated by revelations that large quantities of undistributed food, clothing and medicines were rotting in government stockpiles. In addition, widespread floods that August severely reduced the rice harvest, leading to further food shortages and price increases. As the end of 1974 approached, feelings against Ne Win and the Government were running high.

=== Relationship with the 1962 and 1988 uprisings ===
Selth notes that the funeral crisis "[tends] to be forgotten, or dismissed as a mere footnote in Burmese history". Nevertheless, some historical accounts of the funeral crisis frame its causes in terms of political repression, economic failure, and as part of a broader struggle for democracy and freedom. Some authors see it as part of a larger pattern that includes the 1988 uprising and the 1962 Rangoon University protests. For instance, scholar Donald Seekins notes that the funeral crisis was a reawakening of student political activism which had been otherwise dormant since Ne Win shut down the People's Peace Committee in November 1963 and the way that the protests spread from students to the general population was "a pattern that would be apparent on a much larger scale during the unrest of 1988". Historians have also pointed out the powerful symbolism of where the student activists entombed U Thant's body, which was the former site of the RASU Students Union, which had been demolished by the government during the July 1962 crackdown and was a daily reminder for students of those events.

In contrast, historian Robert Taylor holds a different view of the funeral crisis. He writes that the student activists were linked to "amorphous but potent" underground political organisations linked to the Communist Party of Burma, and that students were "often a focus of their activities" and "needed little encouragement when given a cause with which to rally opposition to the government".

== The funeral ==
Escorted by family members and UN personnel, U Thant's body reached Rangoon's Mingaladon Airport on 1 December 1974. Neither an honour guard nor any official government representatives were present to receive the casket. It was driven to the Kyaikkasan Race Course past "increasing numbers of people" who had "lined the road 'in silent reverence and, one felt, abject humiliation'". There, it lay in state until 5 December. According to Thant Myint-U, U Thant's grandson who was eight years old at the time, a large number of members of the public came to pay their respects. Others put the figure in the thousands or in the tens of thousands.

=== Controversy over Ne Win's role ===
The way that the body had been received by the government had led to significant unhappiness among the Burmese public and was a major cause of the events that followed. A commonly cited reason that Ne Win's government refused to provide a state funeral to U Thant is that he held a grudge against U Thant for being a close ally of U Nu. Some historians specifically point towards an incident in 1969 in which U Nu denounced the Ne Win regime at the United Nations in front of the press as further evidence for this.

Thant Myint-U stated that the press conference was arranged entirely by U Nu and without permission from U Thant who was on a mission in Africa at the time. It was the first time that a call for the overthrow of a UN member state government had been made inside the UN. U Thant was aghast and told U Nu that his action was inappropriate. Ne Win was furious and convinced that U Thant had been plotting with U Nu. The general told his men to consider U Thant an "enemy of the state." U Thant flew to Rangoon to explain but Ne Win refused to see him. The rancor was such that U Thant, still officially the country's top diplomat, had difficulty renewing his passport.

Thant Myint-U reports that Ne Win even sacked his deputy education minister for suggesting to the cabinet that the day of the funeral be made a holiday. Robert Taylor, however, posits that Ne Win's ire at U Thant had lessened over time, and that he had no role in the funeral arrangements.

== First coffin snatch ==
The government had planned to bury U Thant in the Kyandaw Cemetery on 5 December. The relative insignificance of the burial site reportedly angered student activists. As such, they had organised themselves to march to the grounds. Students from the Rangoon Institute of Technology (RIT), RASU, the Rangoon Medical College, and the Institute of Education took part in the march, which was supported by onlookers and monks. 50,000 people were present at the Kyaikkasan grounds for the final funeral rites. At 3 p.m., the time of the planned funeral procession, a group of monks handed U Thant's body to the students, who "announced through loudspeakers that they wished to ensure a fitting interment for Thant and criticized the Government's failure to do so". They drove the coffin to the RASU campus and placed it on a makeshift platform in its Convocation Hall. There, the students demanded that the government "find an appropriate burial site and construct a mausoleum befitting such a distinguished figure". Tyn Myint-U, U Thant's son-in-law, reports that thousands of students were present, and Selth notes that the Hall became a platform for left-wing students to make fiery political speeches against Ne Win and the government.

=== Negotiations ===
On 6 December, a meeting was held with U Thant's family, a group of student activists from the RASU, and government officials. Accounts of this negotiation differ. Mya Maung writes:

The student leaders cast votes on the issue of surrendering the body to the family and the votes of the eleven leaders were seven to four in favor. The four negative votes were cast by the two brothers and two other R.I.T. student leaders. A meeting was held at the Town Hall attended by the student leaders, the family, and government officials. The students leaders and the monks made a three-point proposal of building a mausoleum in Kandawmin Park (Cantonment Park) at the foot of the famed Shwedagon Pagoda upon the return of the coffin, holding a state funeral befitting U Thant's stature, and granting amnesty to all students and citizens involved in the demonstration. The government agreed to the first and the third points of the proposal and refused the second. The family also did not endorse the second point of the proposal for fear of conflict and reprisal.

In contrast, Tyn Myint-U states that he had persuaded the student leaders that a state funeral was not necessary as U Thant had already retired from the UN, and that the students had agreed because Tyn was a family member.

== Second coffin snatch ==
The students at the meeting with the family and the government were from what Tyn dubs the "Convocation Hall Group", composed of RASU students. There was, however, another "rival" group of students from the RIT, the "Mandalay Hostel Group", which was against returning the body to the family. These RIT students had begun construction of a mausoleum at the site of the old Students Union building, which had great political and historical significance for the student activists.

On 8 December, the coffin was brought to this mausoleum "as a gesture toward the students who had wished him interred there". Draped in the UN flag, it was placed on a dais and surrounded by golden umbrellas, a multicoloured Buddhist flag, the flag of the banned Students Union, and a UN flag. Unexpectedly for the family, however:

My family prostrated themselves on the ground before the casket, together with the many young men and women nearby. What seemed like all Rangoon was lined up along the broad avenues from the campus to the Shwedagon Pagoda a couple of miles away. But it was all not to be. At the last moment the more radical student faction seized the coffin yet again with the intent of burying U Thant at the Student Union site, no matter what.

The family fled in fear of a riot. The students entombed the body in the mausoleum they had built, and locked and barricaded the entrances to the campus. Students and monks guarded the entrances and prevented anyone with weapons or cameras from entering. For the next five days, students made passionate speeches at the steps of the Convocation Hall. They denounced Ne Win and the way he treated U Thant's remains, and spoke about democracy, peace, and freedom. The site had become a veritable "revolutionary center". As Seekins describes:

Ordinary citizens flocked to the university to give donations to the demonstrators (an estimated K200,000), and activist leaders delivered increasingly inflammatory speeches at the mausoleum that not only disclosed scandalous details about Ne Win's private life, but also called for the overthrow of his "fascist" regime. They repeatedly pointed out the contrast between U Thant as a "man of peace" and the BSPP state as a government that ruled the country through the barrel of a gun. Some students proclaimed the establishment of a "People's Party" as an alternative to the BSPP, though the latter was under the new constitution the only legal political party.

The mood on the ground was a mix of solidarity and exhilaration as the tone of the speeches became increasingly defiant of the government. As state intervention loomed, however, students armed with sticks formed "suicide squads" to guard the campus entrances, and "moving speeches were made on the theme of liberty or death which left the people gathered on the campus in tears". On the night of 10 December, as many as 2,000 people guarded the mausoleum.

That night, the state-owned Burma Broadcasting Service denounced the students for reneging on their agreement and declared that the students had gone against the wishes of U Thant's family. Furthermore, it charged that the students had illegally used the government's construction materials and occupied the university site (on which to build their mausoleum) without authorisation. There was a two-day lull during which state-owned newspapers and radio kept up a constant barrage of denunciations against the students.

== Crackdown and riots ==
Around 2 a.m. on 11 December, a large number of soldiers and policemen broke the gates down with heavy machinery and stormed the campus. Tear gas and baton charges dispersed the students, and despite some resistance, the security forces gained control of the campus by 3 a.m. By 4 a.m., the officers broke open the mausoleum and retrieved the casket. Early the next morning, the casket was buried at the Kandawmin Garden Mausolea below the Shwedagon Pagoda.

Reported arrest and casualty figures differ greatly. Selth states that about 2,900 people were arrested but does not mention any fatalities. Maung cites students' accounts that the army killed so many students that "the blood of the dead students flowed in a river on campus and when it congealed, it was taken in bags and pockets by the people". Robert Taylor, in contrast, claims that "no-one was killed and few injured".

The crackdown sparked mass riots in Rangoon. Angered by the authorities' treatment of the students, angry crowds attacked police stations, set vehicles ablaze, and damaged markets and cinemas. Government buildings, including the Ministry of Cooperatives, Road Transport Corporation, and the Housing Board were also damaged. An official government report states that "38 offices, 4 police stations, 11 cinemas, 65 cars, 4 motorcycles, a diesel train, and 15 traffic posts" were damaged.

The authorities declared martial law and a state of emergency at 4 p.m. Troops entered the city along with armored cars and tanks. With "brutal efficiency", the army fired upon crowds and arrested protesters. State-controlled media described the situation as widespread "mob rule". A curfew was imposed from 6 p.m. to 6 a.m. and special courts were established to swiftly mete out punishments to those involved.

According to the government, 2,887 persons were arrested, while Taylor reports that 1,800 arrests were made. Fatality figures are also uncertain. While the official figures of dead and wounded, as reported by Taylor, were 9 dead and 74 injured, other sources paint a much more grim picture:

A Thai newspaper quoted one Burmese mortician who claimed personally to have examined nearly 50 bodies on the first day. Steinberg states that 13 were killed and 70 wounded, but also cites rumours of over 1000 dead, buried in an unmarked mass grave near the Mingaladon military cantonment area. Student sources have claimed that over 100 of their number were killed in the demonstrations. Whatever the exact figure, few could argue with a United States Embassy official who told international news agencies that 'The military has been very heavy-handed'. In his estimation the Government's casualty count was 'way too low'.

== End of the crisis ==
The violence died down by 15 December, and the military's lockdown on the city eased over the week that followed. House searches and arrests still occurred. 2,000 were questioned, half of whom were students, but unofficial figures ran as high as 7,000. According to official figures, 196 were jailed for rioting and destroying public property, and 100 to 200 were charged with treason.

The political implications of the incident mainly revolve around the state of the BSPP government and its reliance on the military to exercise its power. Arumugam argues that the riots were evidence of "urban discontent over the government's failure to provide the people with adequate basic necessities", and more broadly demonstrated that the BSPP had failed to fully develop into a people's party. Selth argues that "outside the armed forces, the regime could not claim the allegiance of any significant social group and that the BSPP's urban cadre failed to enforce law and order as it had to rely on the army to stop the riots." Moreover, he argues that the events showed a lack of "viable alternative leadership able to replace Ne Win and his supporters", and that even the monks had failed to use the protests to effectively challenge the government. Taylor similarly notes that the 1974 crisis was one of the last student-led political uprisings until the end of Ne Win's rule, except for protests during the 100th anniversary of nationalist Thakin Kodaw Hmaing in 1976.
