= U Thant =

UN Secretary-General from 1961 to 1971

- သန့်
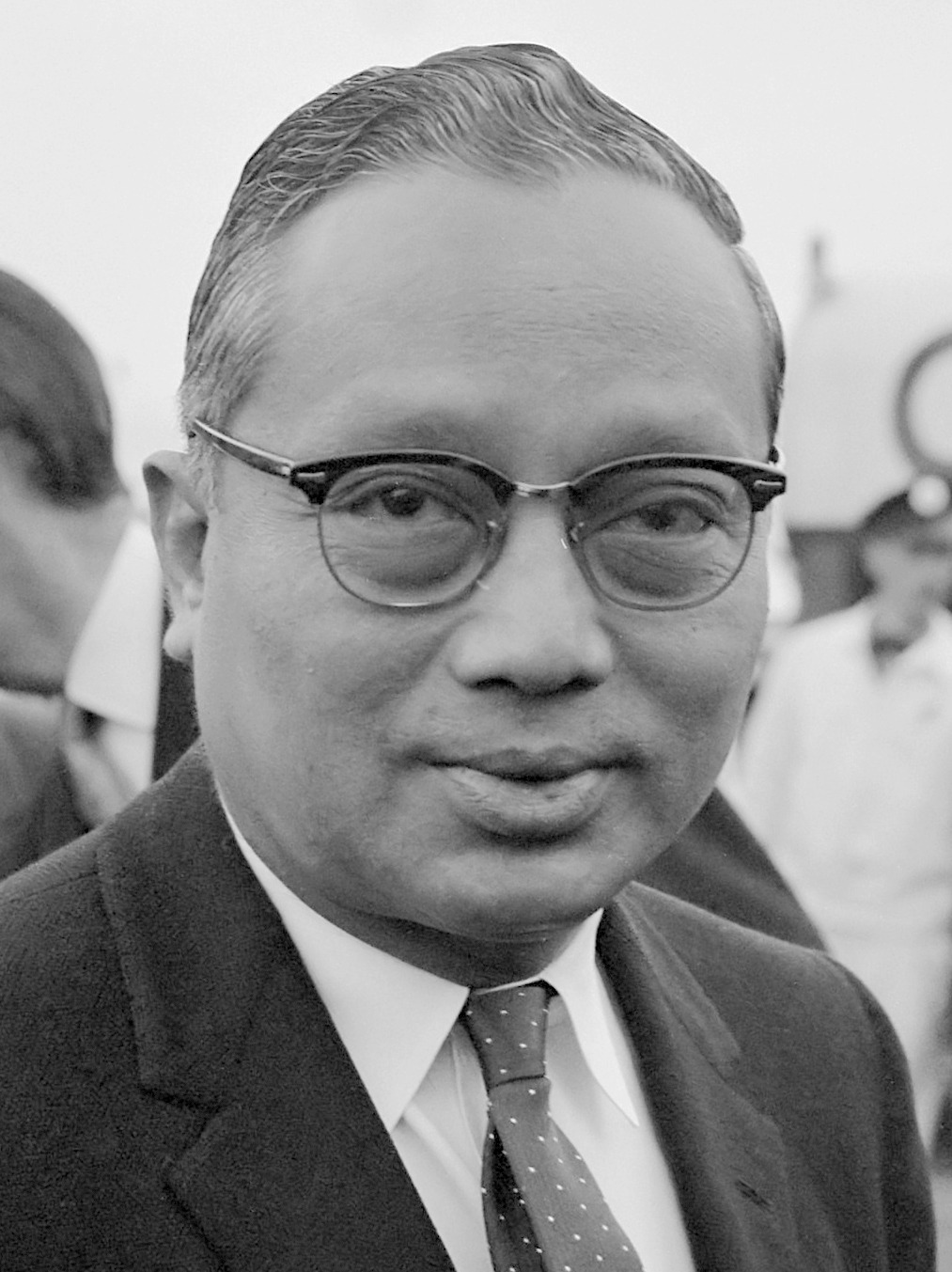
- U Thant in 1963

3rd Secretary-General of the United Nations
- In office 3 November 1961 – 31 December 1971
- Preceded by: Dag Hammarskjöld
- Succeeded by: Kurt Waldheim

Personal details
- Born: 22 January 1909 Pantanaw, British Burma
- Died: 25 November 1974 (aged 65) New York City, U.S.
- Resting place: Kandawmin Garden Mausolea, Yangon, Myanmar
- Party: AFPFL (1947–1958)
- Spouse: Daw Thein Tin (m. 1932)
- Relations: Thant Myint-U (grandson)
- Children: 3
- Education: University of Rangoon

Thant (Burmese: သန့်, MLCTS: san., pronounced [θa̰ɰ̃]; 22 January 1909 – 25 November 1974), known honorifically as U Thant (/uː θɑːnt/), (Note: U is an honorific in Burmese, roughly equal to "Mister". Thant was his only name, per Burmese convention. In Burmese, he was known as Pantanaw U Thant, in reference to his hometown, Pantanaw.) was a Burmese diplomat and the third secretary-general of the United Nations from 1961 to 1971, the first Asian to hold the position. He held the office for a record 10 years and one month.

A native of Pantanaw, Thant was educated at the National High School and at Rangoon University. In the days of tense political climate in Burma, he held moderate views positioning himself between fervent nationalists and British loyalists. He was a close friend of Burma's first Prime Minister U Nu and served in various positions in Nu's cabinet from 1948 to 1961. Thant had a calm and unassuming demeanour that won his colleagues' respect.

He succeeded James Barrington as Burma's Permanent Representative to the United Nations. He was appointed Secretary-General in 1961, six weeks after his predecessor, Dag Hammarskjöld, had died in an air crash. In his first term, Thant facilitated negotiations between U.S. president John F. Kennedy and Soviet premier Nikita Khrushchev during the Cuban Missile Crisis of 1962, helping to avert a global catastrophe. Later, in December that year, Thant ordered Operation Grandslam, which ended a secessionist insurgency in Congo. He was reappointed as Secretary-General on 2 December 1966, by a unanimous vote of the Security Council. During his second term Thant was well known for publicly criticizing U.S. conduct in the Vietnam War. He oversaw the entry of several newly independent African and Asian states into the UN. He refused to serve a third term, and retired in 1971.

Thant died of lung cancer in 1974.

== Early life ==
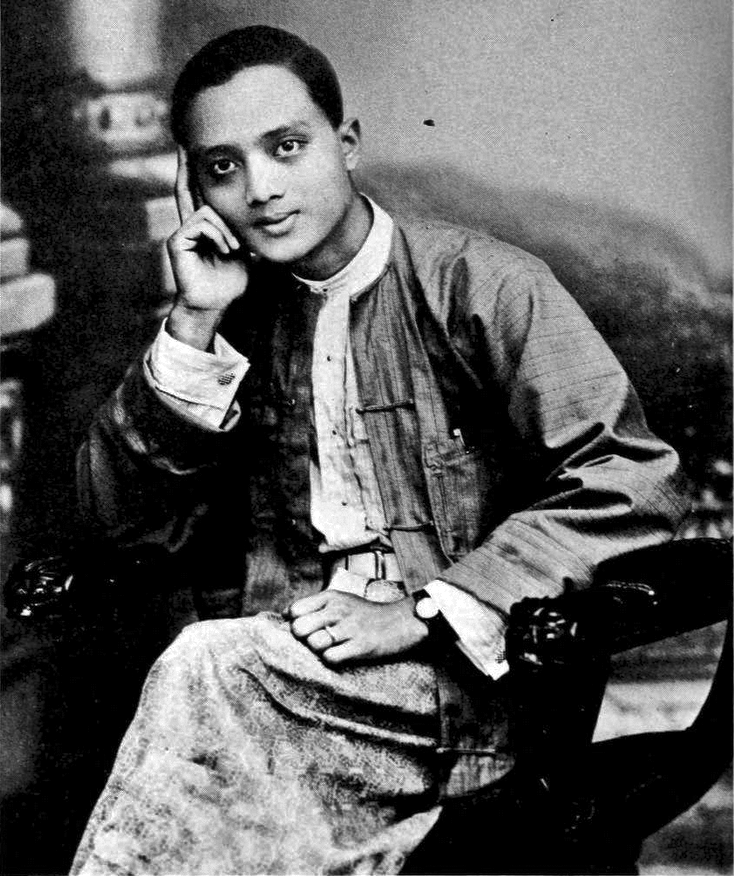
Thant as a Rangoon University student in 1927

Thant was born in Pantanaw, Burma, at the time a province of British India. He was the eldest of four sons of Po Hnit, the nephew and heir of a wealthy landowner and rice merchant, and his wife Nan Thaung. Po Hnit, who had been educated in Calcutta, was the only person in the town who could communicate well in English. He was a founding member of the Burma Research Society and had helped establish The Sun (Thuriya) newspaper in Rangoon.

Although his immediate family members were ethnic Bamars and devout Buddhists, Thant's father, according to Thant Myint-U (U Thant's grandson), was descended from "people from both India and China, Buddhists and Muslims, as well as Shans and Mons". Through his father, Thant was the great-great-grandson of a Bengali Muslim of claimed Mughal descent, who had migrated from Bengal to Burma in the 1820s to seek his fortune. Po Hnit hoped that all his four sons would each earn a degree. His other sons, Khant, Thaung, and Tin Maung, went on to become politicians and scholars.

Po Hnit had collected a personal library of various American and British books and cultivated a reading habit among his children. As a result, Thant became an avid reader and his school friends nicknamed him "The Philosopher". Apart from reading, he enjoyed various sports including hiking, swimming and playing chinlone. He went to the National High School in Pantanaw. At the age of eleven Thant participated in strikes against the University Act of 1920. He dreamed of becoming a journalist and surprised the family by writing an article for the Union of Burma Boy Scouts magazine. Subsequently, he aspired to a government career in the Indian Civil Service (ICS), which was then beginning to accept more Indian and Burmese members. His great-uncle, the landowner, then suddenly died. Though Thant's father Po Hnit had been the likely heir to the estate and had filed a claim, he too died soon afterwards, when Thant was fourteen, and the estate was claimed by distant relatives. The resulting inheritance disputes forced Thant's mother, Nan Thaung, and her four children into difficult financial times. Nan Thaung pursued her late husband's claims up to the Rangoon High Court, but was ultimately unsuccessful.

After the death of his father, Thant believed he would not be able to complete a four-year degree and instead worked for a two-year teaching certificate at Rangoon University in 1926. As the eldest son he had to fulfill his filial duties and responsibilities to the family. At university, Thant, together with future Prime Minister Nu studied history under D. G. E. Hall. Nu was told by a distant mutual relative to take care of Thant and the two soon became close friends. Thant was elected joint secretary of the University Philosophical Association and secretary of the Literary and Debating Society. In Rangoon, Thant met J.S. Furnivall, the founder of The Burma Book Club and The World of Books magazine, to which Thant regularly contributed. Promising a good post, Furnivall urged Thant to complete a four-year university course and join the Civil Service, but Thant refused. After earning the certificate, he returned to Pantanaw to teach at the National High School as a senior teacher in 1928. He contacted Furnivall and Nu regularly, writing articles and participating in The World of Books translation competitions.

In 1931, Thant won first place in All Burma Teachership Examination and became the school's headmaster by the age of twenty-five. Urged by Thant, his friend Nu took the local superintendent of schools position. Thant regularly contributed to several newspapers and magazines under the pen name "Thilawa" and translated a number of books, including one on the League of Nations. His major influences were Sir Stafford Cripps, Sun Yat-sen and Mahatma Gandhi. In the days of tense political climate in Burma, Thant stood moderate grounds between fervent nationalists and British loyalists.

== Civil servant ==
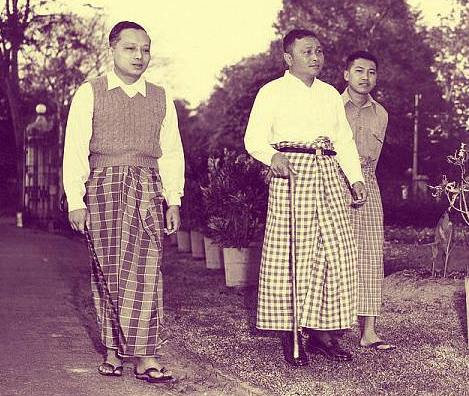
Thant with U Nu in 1955 on an early morning walk

During World War II, the Japanese occupied Burma from 1942 to 1945. They brought Thant to Rangoon to lead the Educational Reorganizing Committee. However, Thant did not have any real power, and returned to Pantanaw. When teaching the Japanese language was made compulsory in Pantanaw high schools, Thant defied the orders and cooperated with the growing anti-Japanese resistance.

In 1948, Burma gained independence from the United Kingdom. Nu became the prime minister of the newly independent Burma and appointed Thant as director of broadcasting in 1948. By then, civil war had broken out. The Karen insurgency began and Thant risked his life to go to Karen camps to negotiate for peace. The negotiations broke down, and in 1949 the advancing insurgents burned his hometown, including his house. The insurgents pushed the front to within four miles of the capital Rangoon before they were beaten back. In the following year, Thant was appointed secretary to the government of Burma in the Ministry of Information. From 1951 to 1957, Thant was secretary to the prime minister, writing speeches for U Nu, arranging his foreign travel, and meeting foreign visitors. During this entire period, he was U Nu's closest confidant and advisor.

He also took part in a number of international conferences and was the secretary of the 1955 Bandung Conference in Indonesia, which gave birth to the Non-Aligned Movement. From 1957 to 1961, he was Burma's permanent representative to the United Nations and became actively involved in negotiations over Algerian independence. In 1961, Thant was named Chairman of the UN Congo Commission. The Burmese government awarded him the title Maha Thray Sithu as a commander in the order of Pyidaungsu Sithu.

== United Nations Secretary-General ==
In September 1961, United Nations Secretary-General Dag Hammarskjöld was killed in a plane crash en route to Congo. Within two weeks, the United States and the Soviet Union had agreed to appoint Thant as the Acting Secretary-General for the remainder of Hammarskjöld's term. However, the two superpowers spent another four weeks arguing over the details of his appointment. On 3 November 1961, the Security Council recommended Thant in Resolution 168, and the General Assembly voted unanimously to appoint Thant to a term of office ending on 10 April 1963.

During his first term, he was widely credited for his role in defusing the Cuban Missile Crisis and for ending the civil war in the Congo. He also said that he wanted to ease tensions between major powers while serving at the UN.

=== First term: Cuban Missile Crisis ===
At a critical moment—when the nuclear powers seemed set on a collision course—the Secretary-General's intervention led to the diversion of the Soviet ships headed for Cuba and interception by our Navy. This was the indispensable first step in the peaceful resolution of the Cuban crisis.

— Adlai Stevenson, Senate Foreign Relations Committee 88th Congress, 13 March 1963

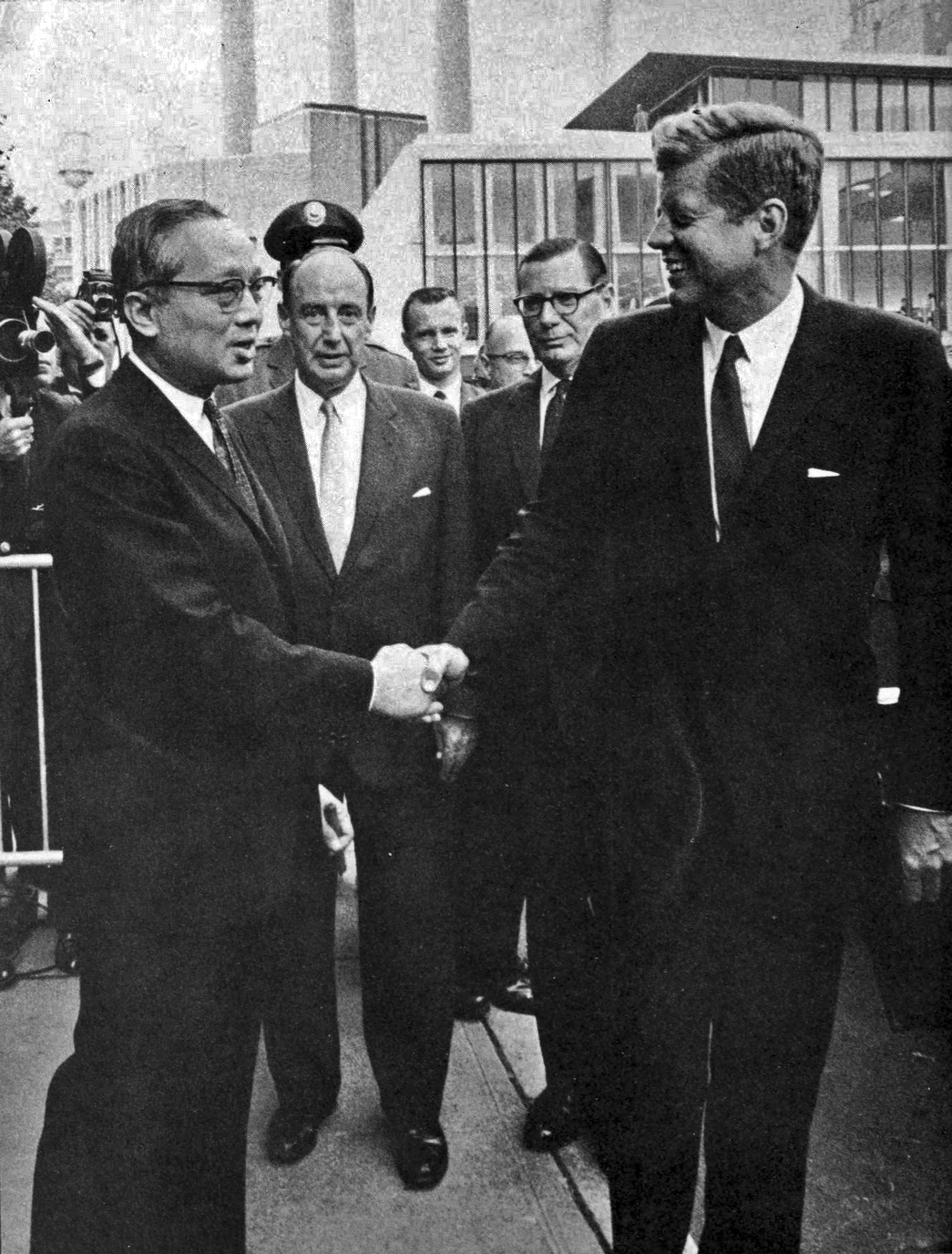
Thant with John F. Kennedy during Kennedy's 1961 visit to the UN Headquarters

In less than one year in office, Thant faced a critical challenge to defuse the Cuban Missile Crisis, the moment when the world came closest to a nuclear war. On 20 October 1962, two days before public announcements were made, U.S. president John F. Kennedy showed Thant U-2 aerial reconnaissance photographs of Soviet missile installations in Cuba. The president then ordered a naval "quarantine" to remove all offensive weapons from Soviet ships bound for Cuba. Meanwhile, Soviet ships were approaching the quarantine zone. To avoid a naval confrontation, Thant proposed that the U.S. should make non-invasion guarantees in exchange for missile withdrawal from the Soviet Union. Soviet Premier Khrushchev welcomed the proposal, which formed the basis of further negotiations. Khrushchev further agreed to suspend missile shipments while the negotiations were ongoing. However, on 27 October 1962, a U-2 plane was shot down over Cuba, deepening the crisis. Kennedy was under intense pressure to invade from the Joint Chiefs of Staff and the Executive Committee (ExComm). Kennedy hoped Thant would play the role of mediator and subsequently replied to ExComm and the Joint Chiefs, "On the other hand we have U Thant, and we don't want to sink a ship...right in the middle of when U Thant is supposedly arranging for the Russians to stay out."

Negotiations continued. The U.S. agreed to dismantle missiles in Turkey and guaranteed never to invade Cuba in exchange for removal of Soviet missiles in Cuba. Thant flew to Cuba and discussed with Fidel Castro allowing UN missile inspectors and the return of the body of the downed U-2 pilot. Castro, furious that the Soviets had agreed to remove missiles without his knowledge, categorically rejected any UN inspectors, although he did return the pilot's body. The inspection was done at sea by US reconnaissance aircraft and warships. The crisis was resolved and a war between superpowers was averted.

=== Continuation of first term: War in the Congo ===
Thant's reappointment was assured when Soviet Premier Nikita Khrushchev made several favorable references to Thant in letters to U.S. president John F. Kennedy. In November 1962, the General Assembly voted unanimously to promote Thant from Acting Secretary-General to Secretary-General for a term ending on 3 November 1966. For personal reasons, Thant wanted his term to end five years from his initial appointment, and he would henceforth consider his first five years in office to be a single term.

Although a manifest pacifist and a devout Buddhist, Thant did not hesitate to use force when required. During the Congo Civil War in 1962, Katangan secessionists led by Moise Tshombe repeatedly attacked UN Operation in the Congo forces (ONUC). In December 1962, after ONUC suffered a sustained four-day attack in Katanga, Thant ordered the "Operation Grandslam" to gain "complete freedom of movement for ONUC all over Katanga." The operation proved to be decisive and ended the secessionist insurgency once and for all. By January 1963, the secessionist capital Elizabethville was under full UN control. In his speech at Columbia University Thant expressed expectation of completion of the United Nations Operation in the Congo in mid 1964.

For his role in defusing the Cuban crisis and other peacekeeping efforts, the Norwegian Permanent Representative of the United Nations informed Thant that he would be awarded the 1965 Nobel Peace Prize. He humbly replied, "Is not the Secretary-General merely doing his job when he works for peace?" On the other hand, Chairman Gunnar Jahn of the Nobel Peace Prize committee lobbied heavily against giving Thant the prize, which was, at the last minute, awarded to UNICEF. The rest of the committee all wanted the prize to go to Thant. The disagreement lasted three years, and in 1966 and 1967 no prize was given, with Gunnar Jahn effectively vetoing an award to Thant. Outraged, Thant's undersecretary and Nobel Prize laureate Ralph Bunche called Gunnar Jahn's decision "gross injustice to U Thant."

In April 1964, Thant accepted the Holy See's designation of itself as a UN permanent observer. There appeared to be no involvement of the General Assembly or the UN Security Council in the decision.

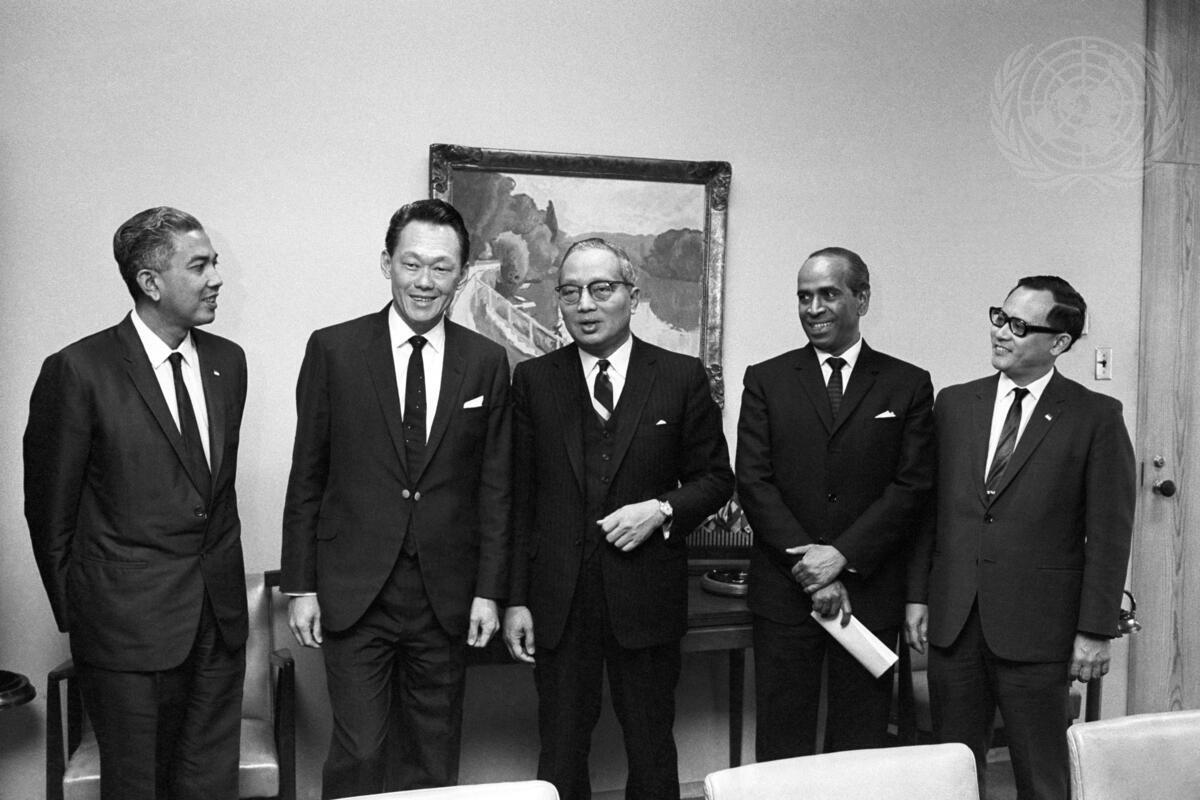
Prime Minister of Singapore Visits UN Headquarters on 21 October 1967: Seen here, from left: Inche Rahim Ishak (Abdul Rahim Ishak), Minister of State for Education of Singapore; Prime Minister Lee Kuan Yew; Secretary-General U Thant; S. Rajaratnam, Minister of Foreign Affairs of Singapore; and Ambassador Wong Lin Ken, Permanent Representative of Singapore to the United Nations.

=== Second term: Arab–Israeli conflict and Vietnam War ===
After the Six-Day War, [Thant] allowed himself to become a convenient scapegoat for international inaction, accepting this unenviable role with as much Buddhist detachment as could be summoned.

— Walter Dorn, 2007

Thant announced in 1966 that he would not stand for a second term, but he accepted a draft when the Security Council assured him that he would not be a "glorified clerk." On 2 December 1966, the General Assembly re-appointed Thant to a term ending on 31 December 1971, on the unanimous recommendation of the Security Council. During his second term, he oversaw the entry into the UN of dozens of new Asian and African states, and was a firm opponent of apartheid in South Africa. He also established many of the UN's development and environmental agencies, funds and programmes, including the UN Development Programme (UNDP), the UN University, the United Nations Conference on Trade and Development, United Nations Institute for Training and Research (UNITAR), and the UN Environmental Programme. The Six-Day War between Arab countries and Israel, the Prague Spring and subsequent Soviet invasion of Czechoslovakia, and the Indo–Pakistani War of 1971 leading to the birth of Bangladesh all took place during his tenure as secretary-general.

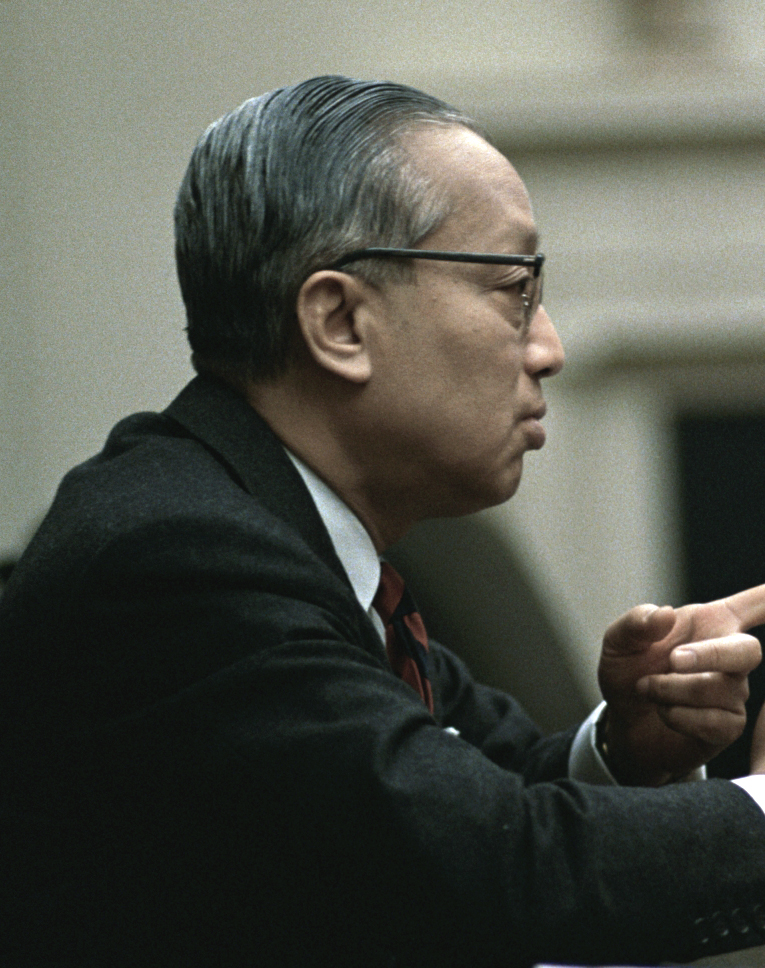
Thant meeting with U.S. president Lyndon B. Johnson in the Cabinet Room of the White House on 21 February 1968

He was criticized in the US and Israel for agreeing to pull UNEF troops out of the Sinai in 1967 in response to a request from Egyptian president Gamal Abdel Nasser. The Permanent Representative of Egypt had informed Thant that the Egyptian government had decided to terminate UNEF's presence in the Sinai and the Gaza Strip, and requested steps that would withdraw the force as soon as possible, which Thant was obligated to accept. The UN afterwards stated, "Because Israel refused to accept UNEF on its territory, the Force had to be deployed only on the Egyptian side of the border, and thus its functioning was entirely contingent upon the consent of Egypt as the host country. Once that consent was withdrawn, its operation could no longer be maintained." Thant, by flying to Cairo in a last-minute peace effort, tried to persuade Nasser not to go to war with Israel.

In Israel, his abrupt unilateral withdrawal of UNEF without any diplomatic process or wider consultation was regarded as a violation of United Nations assurances and commitments given to Israel in 1957, on the basis of which Israel had withdrawn from Sinai and Gaza at that time, and it "thereafter inspired Israel's refusal to place her vital interests again in United Nations hands".

Thant's once good relationship with the US government deteriorated rapidly when he publicly criticized American conduct of the Vietnam War. His secret attempts at direct peace talks between Washington and Hanoi were eventually rejected by the Johnson administration.

In 1971, the participation of the People's Republic of China in the United Nations, which was a long-standing problem, was realized. Thant sent a message to the Chinese government asking China to send a delegation.

=== Retirement ===
On 23 January 1971, Thant announced that he would "under no circumstances" be available for a third term as secretary-general. The 1971 United Nations Secretary-General selection was delayed by the anticipated arrival of the People's Republic of China, and the Security Council did not begin voting until two weeks before the end of Thant's term. After every candidate was vetoed in the second round, Kurt Waldheim accidentally won in the third round when the United States, United Kingdom, and China failed to coordinate their vetoes and all abstained.

Unlike his two predecessors, Thant retired after ten years on speaking terms with all the big powers. In 1961, when he was first appointed, the Soviet Union tried to insist on a troika formula of three secretaries-general, one representing each Cold War bloc, to maintain equality in the United Nations between the superpowers. By 1966, when Thant was reappointed, all the big powers, in a unanimous vote of the Security Council, affirmed the importance of the secretary-generalship and his good offices, a clear tribute to Thant's work.

In his farewell address to the United Nations General Assembly, Secretary-General Thant stated that he felt a "great sense of relief bordering on liberation" on relinquishing the "burdens of office". In an editorial published around 27 December 1971, praising Thant, The New York Times stated that "the wise counsel of this dedicated man of peace will still be needed after his retirement". The editorial was titled "The Liberation of U Thant".

After his retirement, Thant was appointed a senior fellow of the Adlai Stevenson Institute of International Affairs. He spent the last years of his life writing and advocating the development of a true global community and other general themes he had tried to promote while he was secretary-general. While serving as secretary-general, Thant lived in Riverdale, Bronx, on a 4.75-acre (1.92 ha) estate near 232nd Street, between Palisade and Douglas Avenues.

== Death and legacy ==
U Thant has put the world deeply in his debt.

— John F. Kennedy, October 1962

Thant died of lung cancer at the NewYork-Presbyterian Hospital in New York on 25 November 1974. By then, Burma was ruled by a military junta, which refused him any honours. Burmese president Ne Win was supposedly envious of Thant's international stature and the respect that was accorded him by the Burmese populace.

However, Thant's grandson, Thant Myint-U, wrote in the book The River of Lost Footsteps: Histories of Burma that intense animosity between Thant and Ne Win went back only to 1969, when Ne Win believed Thant was conniving with Nu after Nu denounced Ne Win at a press corps meeting at the UN headquarters. Ne Win told his men to consider Thant as an enemy of the state, despite Thant denouncing Nu's action as inappropriate.

Ne Win ordered for Thant to be buried without any official involvement or ceremony.

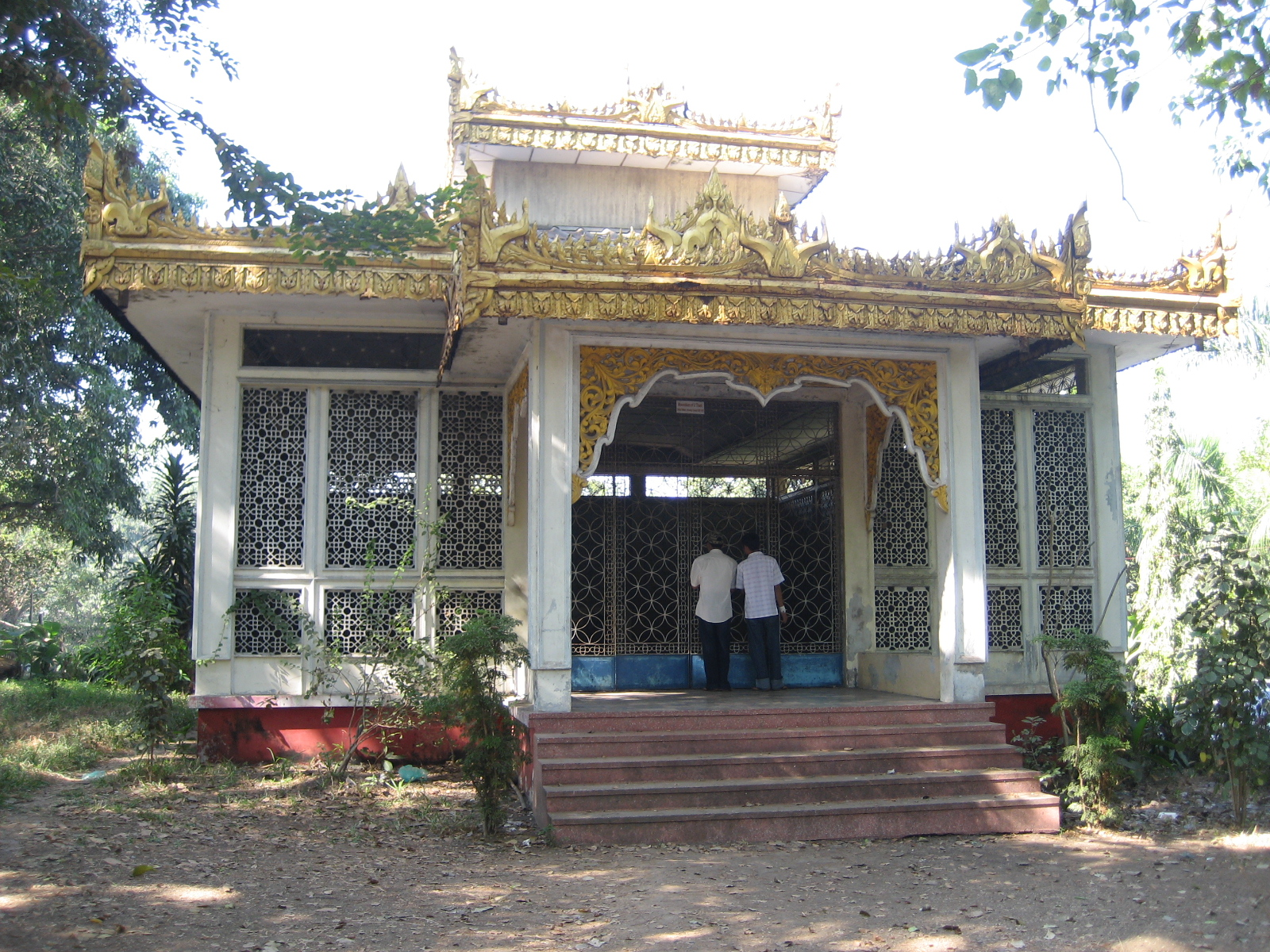
Thant's tomb, Shwedagon Pagoda Road, Rangoon

From the United Nations headquarters in New York where he was laid in state, Thant's body was flown back to Rangoon, but no guard of honour or high-ranking officials were at hand at the airport when the coffin arrived except for U Aung Tun, deputy minister of education, who was subsequently dismissed from office. On the day of Thant's funeral on 5 December 1974, tens of thousands of people lined the streets of Rangoon to pay their last respects. Thant's coffin was displayed at Rangoon's Kyaikkasan Race Course for a few hours before the scheduled burial. The coffin of Thant was then snatched by a group of students just before it was scheduled to leave for burial in an ordinary Rangoon cemetery at Kyandaw. The student demonstrators buried Thant on the former grounds of the Rangoon University Students Union (RUSU), which Ne Win had dynamited and destroyed on 8 July 1962.

During the period of 5–11 December, the student demonstrators also built a temporary mausoleum for Thant on the grounds of the RUSU and gave anti-government speeches. In early morning on 12 December 1974, government troops stormed the campus, killed some of the students guarding the makeshift mausoleum, removed Thant's coffin, and reburied it in Kandawmin Garden Mausolea near the Shwedagon Pagoda, where it has continued to lie. Upon hearing of the storming of the Rangoon University campus and the forcible removal of Thant's coffin, many people rioted in the streets of Rangoon. Martial law was declared in Rangoon and the surrounding metropolitan areas. What has come to be known as the U Thant crisis, the student-led protests over the shabby treatment of Thant by the Ne Win government, was crushed by the Burmese government.

In April 2012, UN Secretary-General Ban Ki-moon paid his respects at U Thant's mausoleum during a visit to Yangon.

== Personal life ==
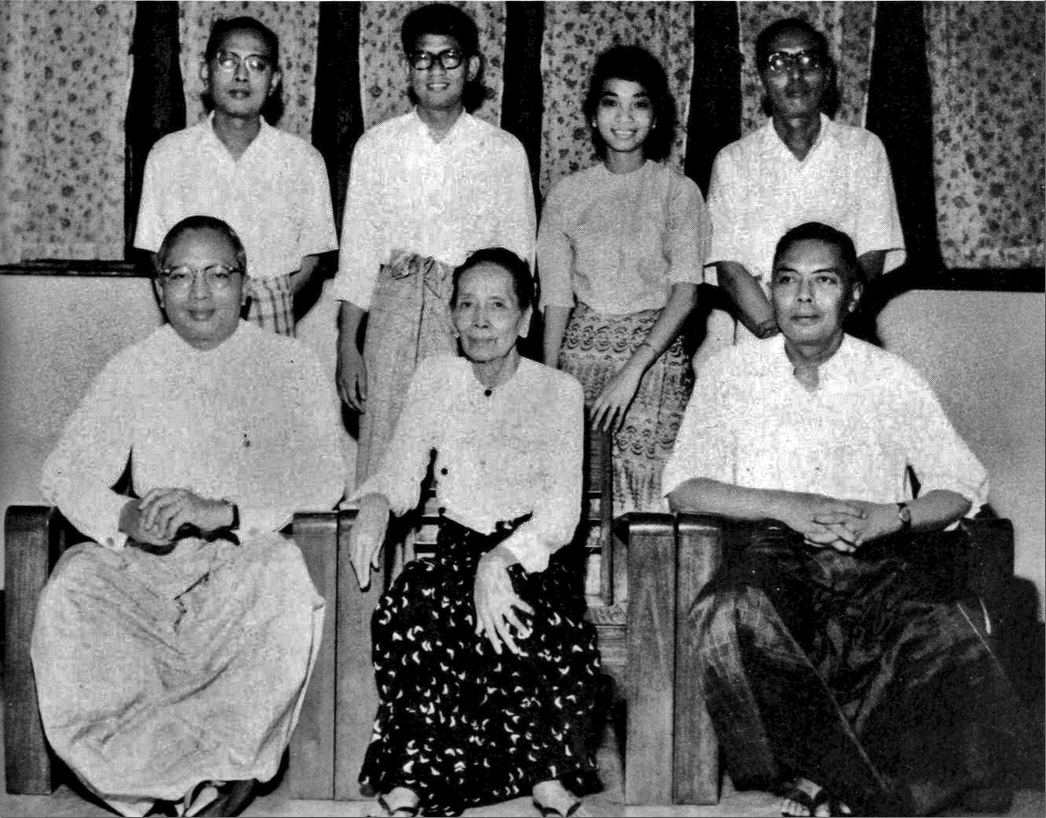
Thant and his family, including brothers Khant, Thaung, and Tin Maung, his mother Nan Thaung, and his daughter Aye Aye Thant and her husband, Tin Myint-U, in 1964

Thant had three brothers: Khant, Thaung, and Tin Maung. He was married to Daw Thein Tin. They had two sons and a daughter, but lost both sons; Maung Bo died in infancy, and Tin Maung Thant fell from a bus during a visit to Yangon. Tin Maung Thant's funeral procession, which was attended by dignitaries, was grander than that of the state funeral of Commodore Than Pe, a member of the 17-man Revolutionary Council and minister of health and education. Thant was survived by a daughter, an adopted son, five grandchildren, and five great-grandchildren (three girls and two boys). His only grandson, Thant Myint-U, is a historian and a former senior official in the UN's Department of Political Affairs and the author of The River of Lost Footsteps, in part a biography of Thant.

== Awards, honors, and memorials ==
Thant was generally reluctant to receive prizes and honors due to his own humility as well as publicity associated with them. He declined Burma's second highest honor awarded to him by U Nu's government in 1961. When he was informed that the 1965 Nobel Prize would instead go to UNICEF due to Chairman Gunnar Jahn's veto, Thant, according to Walter Dorn, "recorded his pleasure". However, he did accept the Jawaharlal Nehru Award for International Understanding in 1965 and the United Nations Prize in the Field of Human Rights in 1973.

Thant received honorary degrees (LL.D) from Carleton University, Williams College, Princeton University, Mount Holyoke College, Harvard University, Dartmouth College, University of California at Berkeley, University of Denver, Swarthmore College, New York University, Moscow University, Queen's University, Colby College, Yale University, University of Windsor, Hamilton College, Fordham University, Manhattan College, University of Michigan, Delhi University, University of Leeds, Louvain University, University of Alberta, Boston University, Rutgers University, University of Dublin (Trinity College), Laval University, Columbia University, the University of the Philippines Diliman, and Syracuse University. He also received the Doctor of Divinity from The First Universal Church; Doctor of International Law from Florida International University; Doctor of Laws from University of Hartford; Doctor of Civil Laws degree, honoris causa from Colgate University; Doctor of Humane Letters from Duke University.

In his memory, Sri Chinmoy, the leader of the UN Meditation Group founded by Thant, established the U Thant Peace Award which acknowledges and honors individuals or organizations for distinguished accomplishments toward the attainment of world peace. The meditation team also named a tiny island in the East River opposite the headquarters of the United Nations U Thant Island. The road Jalan U-Thant (U-Thant Road) and the township Taman U-Thant in Kuala Lumpur, Malaysia are also named in his honor.

In October 2013, the building of an U Thant library near his Pantanaw house halted for lack of funds. In December 2013, under an effort spearheaded by his daughter Aye Aye Thant and his grandson Thant Myint-U, Thant's house in Yangon was being converted into a museum which would feature his photos, works and personal belongings.

== Citations ==
=== References ===
- June Bingham Birge (1966). U Thant: The Search for Peace. New York: Knopf Publishing Group.
- A. Walter Dorn and Robert Pauk (April 2009). "Unsung Mediator: U Thant and the Cuban Missile Crisis". Diplomatic History. 33 (2): 261–291. doi:10.1111/j.1467-7709.2008.00762.x.
- Louis Kriesberg, Stuart J. Thorson (1991). Timing the De-escalation of International Conflicts. Syracuse, NY: Syracuse University Press. ISBN 978-0-8156-2521-6.
- A. Walter Dorn and Robert Pauk (November 2012). "The closest brush: How a UN secretary-general averted doomsday". Bulletin of the Atomic Scientists. 68 (6): 79–84. Bibcode:2012BuAtS..68f..79D. doi:10.1177/0096340212464363. S2CID 143657372.
- Lewis, Terrance L. (2012). "U Thant". Salem Press Biographical Encyclopedia:Research Starters. Salem Press.
- A. Walter Dorn (2007). "U Thant: Buddhism in Action" (PDF). In Kille, Kent (ed.). The UN Secretary-General and Moral Authority: Ethics and Religion in International Leadership. Washington, DC: Georgetown University Press. ISBN 978-1-58901-180-9.
- Duncan, Evan M., ed. (2004), United Nations, 1969–1972, Foreign Relations of the United States, 1969–1976, vol. V, Washington: United States Government Printing Office
- Thant Myint-U (2025). Peacemaker: U Thant and the Forgotten Quest For a Just World. New York, NY: W. W. Norton & Company. ISBN 978-1-324-05197-8.

Diplomatic posts
Preceded by Dag Hammarskjöld	Secretary-General of the United Nations; November 1961 – December 1971	Succeeded by Kurt Waldheim
