= Kandawmin Garden Mausolea =

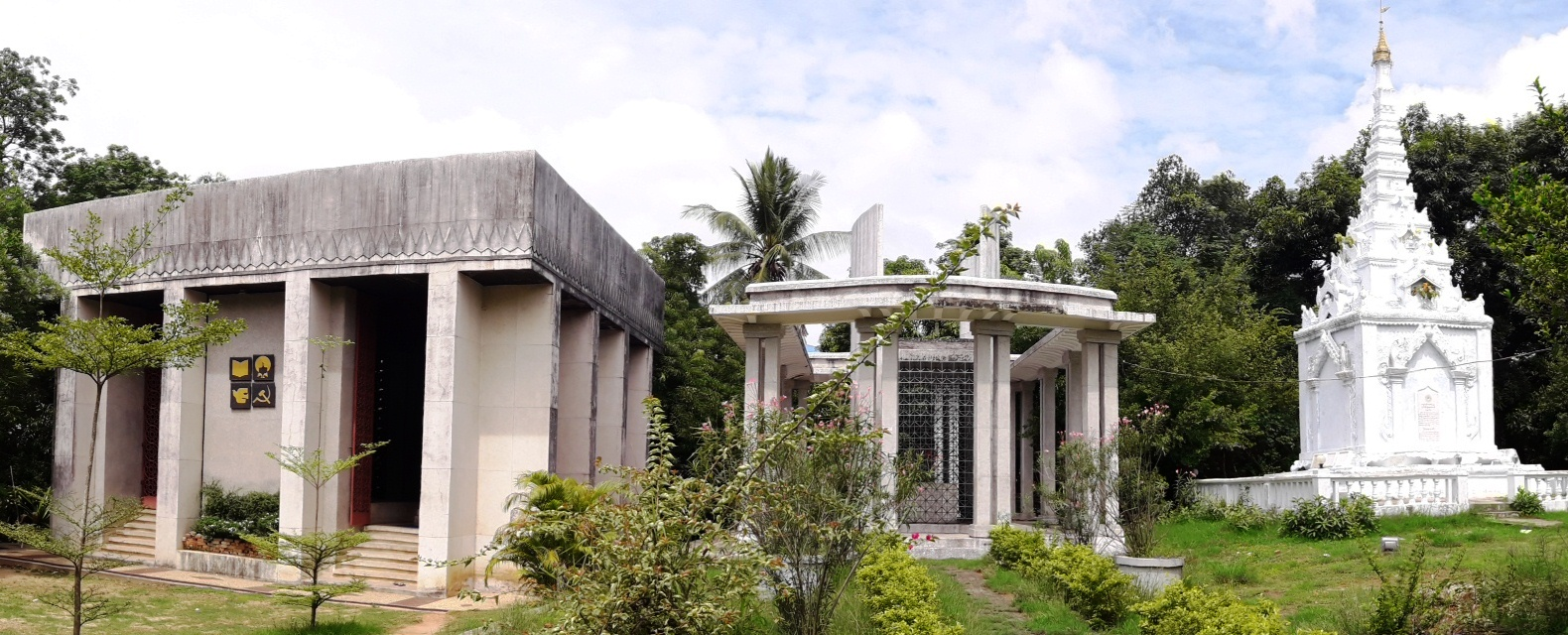
- Kandawmin Garden Mausolea

- Location within Myanmar
- Location: Dagon Township, Yangon, Myanmar
- Coordinates: 16.7927°N 96.1511°E

The Kandawmin Garden Mausolea comprise a mausoleum complex in Yangon, Myanmar. The site contains four mausolea of Burmese national figures and is located near the southern gate of Shwedagon Pagoda. The successive Burmese military governments feared that the mausolea might become a meeting place for democracy activists and they fell into a state of neglect. The former military regime omitted them from the Yangon City Heritage List because they are symbols of national liberty and considered a threat to its status and power.

The site contains mausolea of Supayalat, queen consort of the last king of Myanmar; the nationalist and writer Thakin Kodaw Hmaing; former UN Secretary-General U Thant; and Aung San Suu Kyi’s mother, Khin Kyi.

== List of Mausolea ==
=== Mausoleum of Queen Supayalat ===
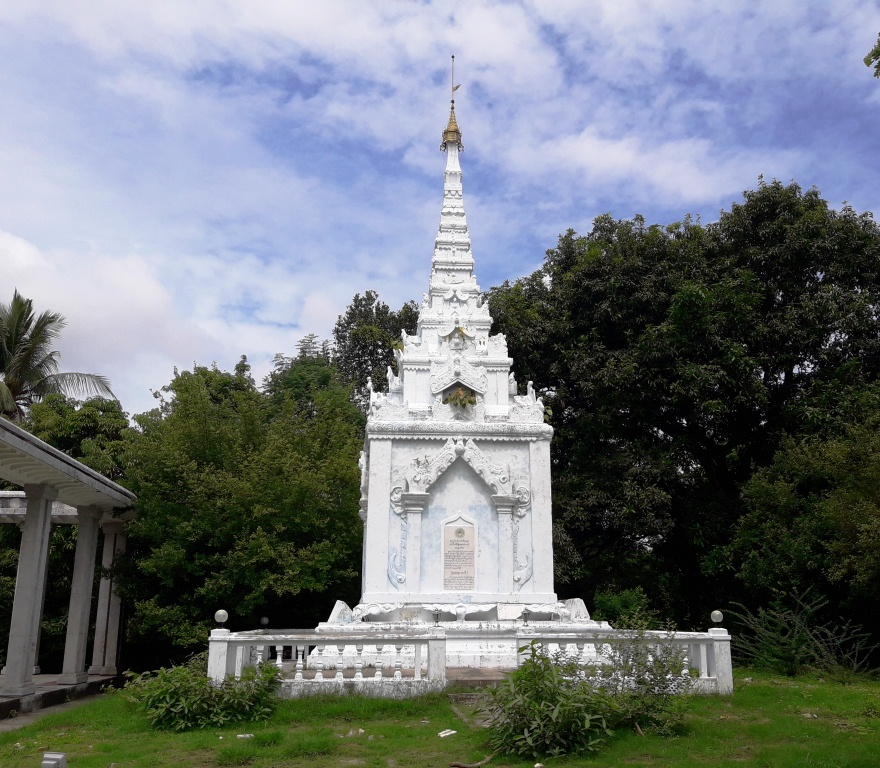
Supayalat's Mausoleum

The mausoleum was built in memory of Supayalat, queen consort of the last king of Myanmar, Thibaw Min, and daughter of King Mindon. She was sent into exile in India in 1885 and allowed to return to Rangoon (Yangon) in 1919. She died six years later, in 1925—shortly before her 66th birthday. The colonial government declared a national holiday on the day of her funeral, but denied the royal family’s request to bury her in Mandalay Palace for fear that it would promote nationalism. Her funeral was held with pomp and ceremony as befitted a Burmese queen, shielded under eight white royal umbrellas, attended by 90 Buddhist monks and the British Governor Sir Harcourt Butler with a guard of honour of the Mounted Police complete with a 30 gun salute.

Supayalat lies buried between the mausolea of Khin Kyi and U Thant. It is a Burmese pavilion with a seven tiered roof.

=== Mausoleum of Thakin Kodaw Hmaing ===
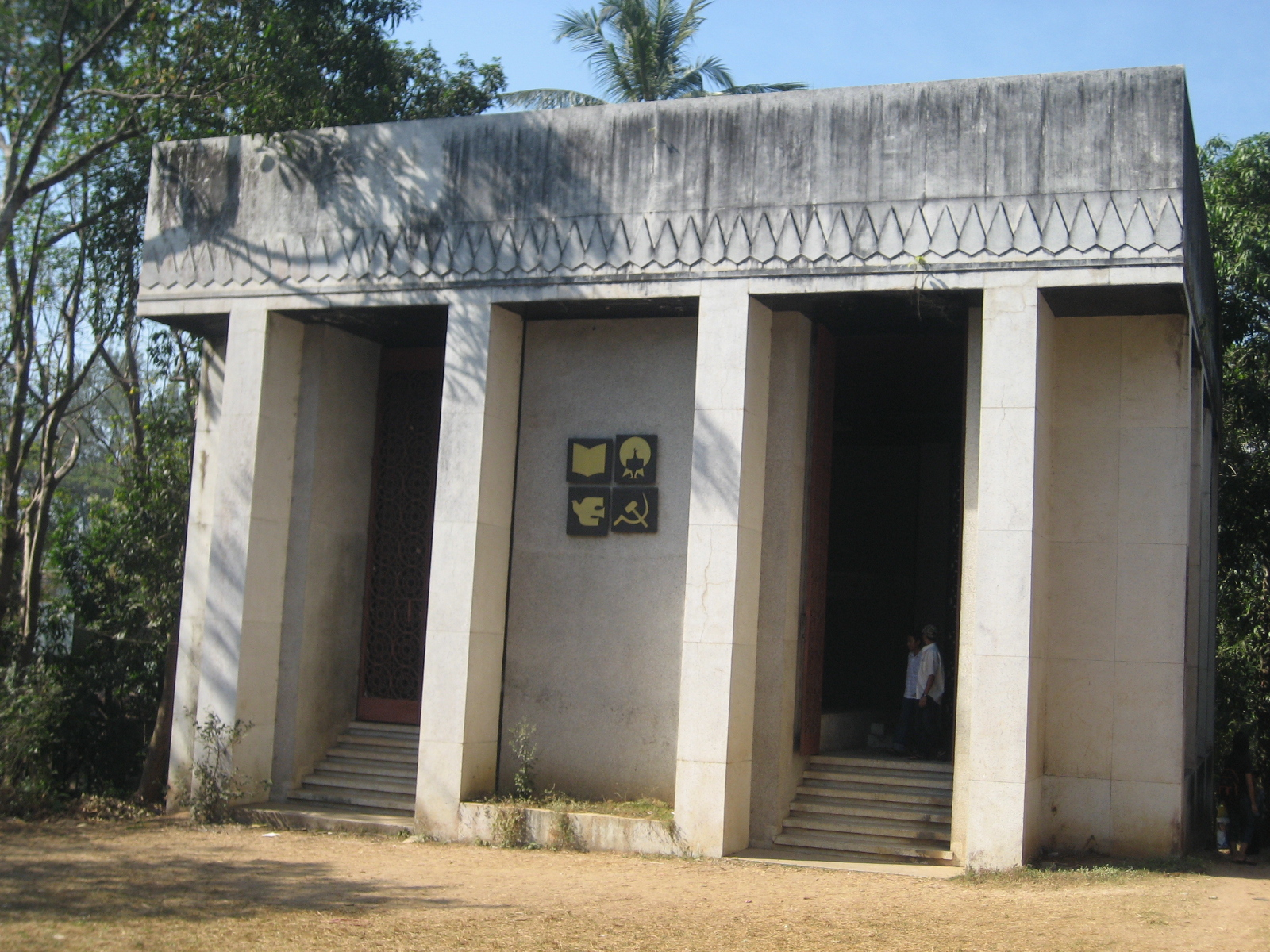
Thakin Kodaw Hmaing's Mausoleum

The mausoleum was built in memory of Thakin Kodaw Hmaing, one of the greatest Burmese poets, writers and political leaders. He died on 23 July 1964 and his mausoleum was built near the Mausoleum of Queen Supayalat.

=== Mausoleum of U Thant ===
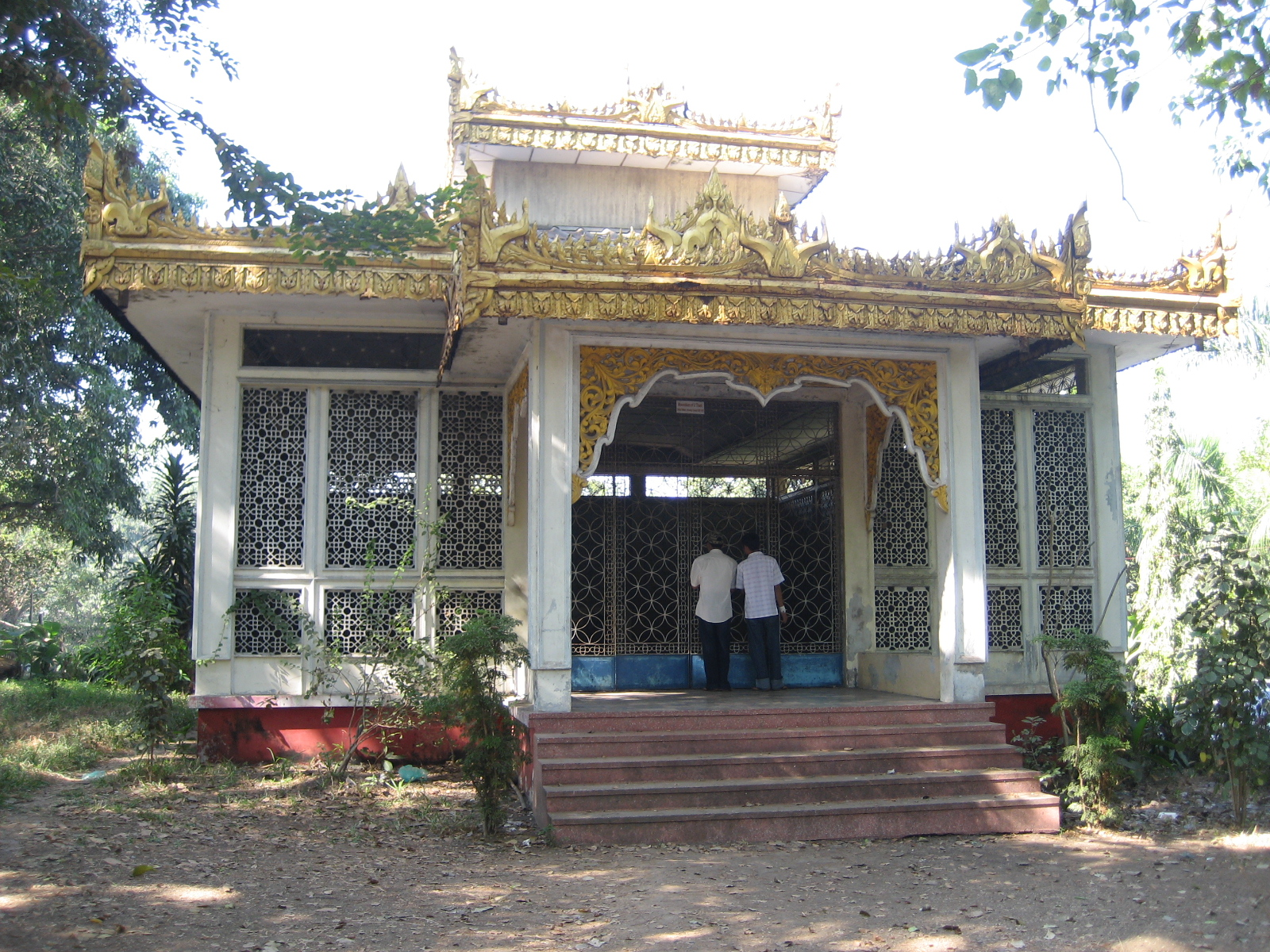
U Thant's Mausoleum

The mausoleum was built in memory of U Thant, the third Secretary-General of the United Nations. U Thant died of lung cancer on 25 November 1974 and his body was brought home from New York City to Rangoon on 1 December 1974. After the government violently crushed the protests in funeral and coffin snatch, he was buried beside the Mausoleum of Queen Supayalat.

=== Mausoleum of Khin Kyi ===
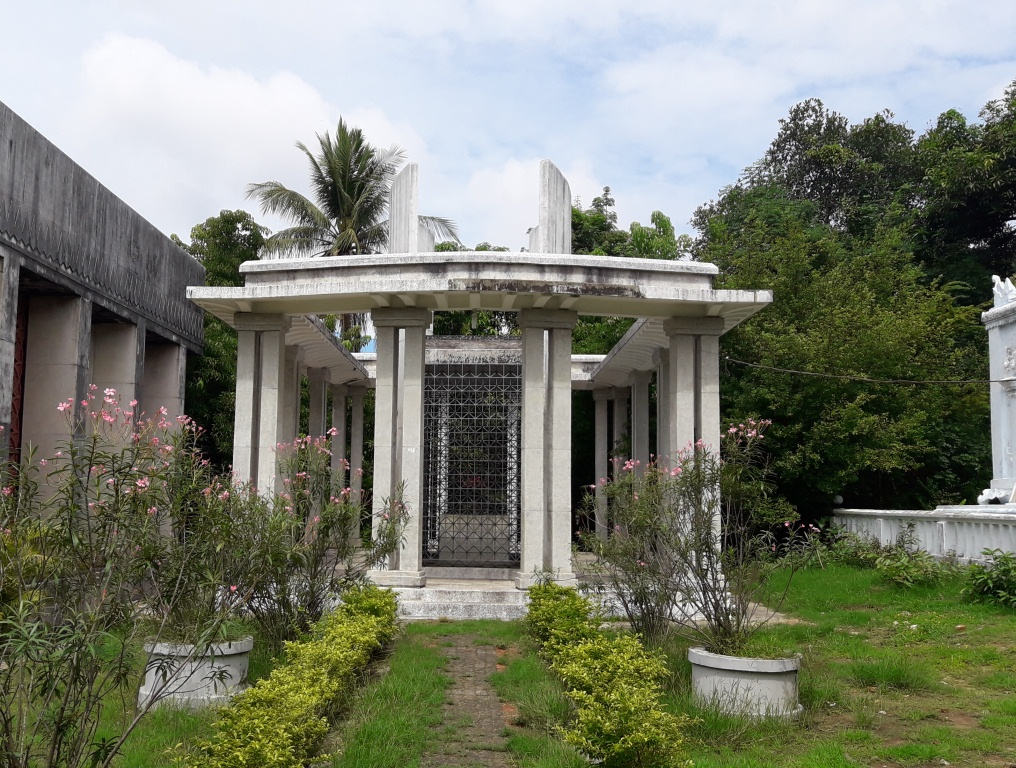
Khin Kyi's Mausoleum

The mausoleum was built in memory of Khin Kyi, wife of Aung San, Father of the Nation of modern-day Myanmar, and mother of Aung San Suu Kyi. She died in Yangon on 28 December 1988, at the age of 76, after suffering a severe stroke. Her funeral, held on 2 January 1989, was attended by over 200,000 people, despite the presence of military trucks which intervened to try to prevent the gathering.

The mausoleum of Khin Kyi lies to the south of the Mausoleum of Queen Supalayat.

== Political significance ==
In December 1974, the government refused to hold a state funeral U Thant, and a series of protests and riots took place in Yangon known as U Thant funeral crisis. The government declared martial law and violently crushed the protests.

On 23 March 1976, university students used the 100th anniversary of Thakin Kodaw Hmaing’s birth to gather at his mausoleum. More than 100 students were arrested during the peaceful anti-government demonstration. Since then, Thakin Kodaw Hmaing had become anathema to the military regime. His writings had been censored and even mention of his name banned from time to time.
