= 1962 Rangoon University protests =

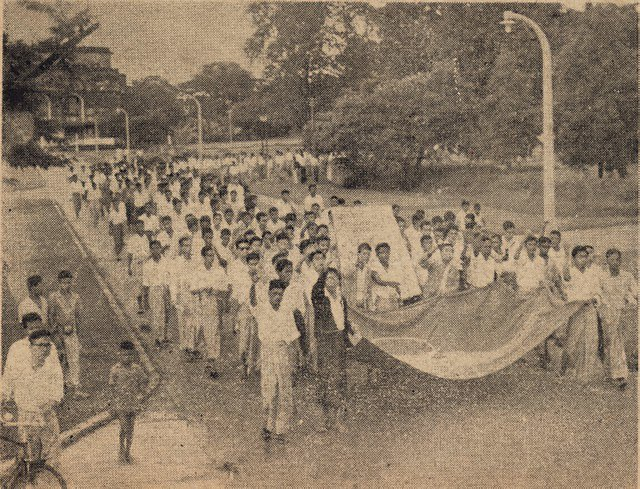
- 7 July 1962 Peaceful march from Convocation Hall on Chancellor Road
- Date: 7 July 1962 – 1963
- Location: Rangoon, Burma (present-day Yangon, Myanmar)
- Caused by: Unjust university rules
- Methods: Civil resistance, demonstrations, nonviolent resistance
- Result: Violent suppression by the government

Casualties
- Deaths: 15–100+

The 1962 Rangoon University protests, also known as the 7 July Student Uprising (Burmese: ဆဲဗင်းဂျူလိုင် ကျောင်းသား အရေးတော်ပုံ), were a series of marches, demonstrations, and protests against stricter campus regulations, the end of the system of university self-administration, and the policy of the new military regime of General Ne Win. The main events took place in Rangoon, Burma (present-day Yangon, Myanmar), from 7 to 8 July 1962. On 7 July the military regime violently suppressed a student demonstration at Rangoon University attended by some 5,000 students. This resulted in the deaths of more than one hundred, and the arrest of more than 6,000 students according to unofficial sources. However, official government statements put the death toll at 15. In the morning hours of the next day, the military regime blew up the historic Rangoon University Students' Union (RUSU) building, which had been the symbol of the anti-colonial nationalism struggle since the 1920s.

The reaction of the military regime disclosed for the first time its new tough stance against all regime opponents as part of implementing the new state ideology, the Burmese Way to Socialism, which included bringing "almost all of Burma's political, social, and economic life under strict military control". It also demonstrated that the effective suppression of student activism and the de-politicisation of the universities ranked high among the strategic goals of the new government. Students had been in the vanguard of the Burmese anti-colonial nationalist struggle ever since the first student protests in Burma began in 1920. Although the regime had been successful in ending the student protests, the violent reaction nonetheless undermined its support among the broader population and created a symbolic focal point for later student protests in the following decades.

In the aftermath of the violent crackdown on the student protests, the Government of Ne Win immediately closed all universities for four months and sent all students home. Broad institutional reforms introduced by the 1964 University Education Act, then, brought Burma's universities under strict government control and profoundly hampered cohesive open student activism in subsequent decades. In this respect, the result of the 1962 Rangoon University protests ushered a new era of underground student activism in which open mass student involvement in national politics erupted only sporadically, most prominently during the student protests of the mid-1970s and during the 8888 Uprising in 1988.

The reverberation of the events on 7–8 July 1962 can be felt to this day. General Ne Win prominently illustrated the continuing symbolic power associated with the protests when he referred in his departure speech in 1988 to the destruction of the RUSU building as "one of the key episodes" during his time in power. As recently as 2012 around 14 persons were "taken into custody by local authorities ... to prevent them from going ahead with planned events to mark the 50th anniversary" of the 7 July incidents.

== Rangoon University ==
Since Rangoon University was founded in 1920 as the first university in the British colony of Burma, student activism persistently influenced the development of Burma throughout entirely different regimes. The academic autonomy of Rangoon University was protected by the Rangoon University Act. Students at varies schools even protested the passing of the University Act leading to the formation, in 1921, of the National College which unlike Rangoon included courses taught in Burmese.

=== Students in the vanguard of the anti-colonial movement ===
Taking advantage of the fact that students—together with the sangha (monastic communities)—enjoyed the greatest degree of freedom of all Burmese societal groups during colonial times, they positioned themselves in the vanguard of the anti-colonial movement, especially during the anti-colonial struggles of the 1930s. Rangoon University featured prominently as the centre of civil discontent in Burma during the colonial period with all three major strikes against British rule (1920, 1936 and 1938) starting there. It was during this time, when students filled the power vacuum left by the domestic opposition, they were able to develop a strong shared student identity which became the focal point for later political student activities to come. Moreover, higher education proved crucial for elite formation, which was manifested, among other things, in Rangoon University producing some of the most influential political leaders of Burma.

=== Student activism in post-independence Burma ===
A relatively high degree of autonomy from the government characterised student unions during the parliamentary phase in post-independence Burma. Nonetheless, they were able to exercise considerable political influence because of their close entanglement with the political parties on the national level. However, student activists were divided along party lines. Consequently, all three large student organisations were "affiliated to various political groups that were competing for political power". Overall, student activities exhibited a propensity to act in favour of anti-government activities as left-wing students, who were members or supporters of various left-wing political parties, dominated the student unions.

=== The coup d’etat in March 1962 and its implication for student activism in Burma ===
Military rule, however, heralded a new phase of student activism in Burma characterised by violent confrontations between protesting students and government forces. On 2 March 1962, the military led by General Ne Win took control of Burma through a coup d'état. Not encountering strong resistance from any segment of Burmese society the new regime seized power with almost no use of violence. The army arrested leading elites of the toppled regime, including "the president, the prime minister, members of the cabinet, and justices of the court" as well as leaders of Burmese ethnic minority groups.

Officially, General Ne Win justified the coup d’etat as an essential step to safeguard the unity of the county because of ongoing negotiations between the central government in Rangoon and leaders of the Shan State who threatened secession from the Union of Burma.

Shortly afterwards, the new military regime formed the Union Revolutionary Council, which was exclusively occupied by high-ranking military personnel led by General Ne Win. After a brief initial phase in which General Ne Win ruled by decree, on 9 March 1962 the Revolutionary Council granted him extensive executive, legislative and judicial powers paving the way toward unrestricted military rule.

Additionally, immediately after the coup d’etat, the military regime began to formulate a new ideological basis on which to ground the new state, already outlining the profound transformation Burmese society was about to experience. The Burmese Way to Socialism symbolised the military regime's answer to the question of Burma's place in the modern world. The socialist government's ideology reflected "the mainstream of modern Burmese thought – nationalism and socialism" and strived after "a highly centralised path to official autarky [self-sufficiency] led by a single party and backed by a well-equipped and loyal military".

The initial reaction of Burmese students towards the new military regime was mixed. Whereas some students supported the new government because of its appealing commitment towards 'socialist democracy' or remained neutral for the time being, others expressed their intention to join the armed struggle of the Communist Party of Burma. The student unions protested against the seizure of power in the beginning, but changed their position very quickly after the left-wing National Unity Front—the affiliated political party of the student unions on the national level—indicated its support for the Ne Win government. As a result, "[b]y 6 March, the Rangoon University Students Union, the All Burma Federation of Student Unions, and the Rangoon Student Union had all endorsed the new regime."

=== Increasing tensions after the end of the hot-season vacation in May 1962 ===
This, however, would change very soon after the students returned to classes following their hot-season vacation in May 1962. The new government had introduced new hostel regulations, which were stricter than ever before. Some authors, referring to the military background of General Ne Win, even draw parallels to regulations commonly found in military barracks. Nonetheless, the sceptical attitude of General Ne Win towards student indiscipline was nothing new. He had already shown his discomfort in this regard during his time as prime minister of the military caretaker government. This was reflected in a speech given on 2 December 1958 where he "indicated his concern with student unrest".

May 1962 heralded first subtle signs of growing student discomfort, which would culminate into a broad student protest only a couple of weeks later. First, a student was expelled from his hostel because he did not get on well with his warder. On 9 May, some students were arrested for demonstrating at the Dutch Embassy. On 11 May, the Rangoon University Rector had to resign because of pressure from the Revolutionary Council. The former Education Minister of the 1958 Caretaker Government U Kar replaced him. On 17 May, the military regime introduced substantial institutional reforms ending the system of university self-administration. The Revolutionary Council dissolved the university councils of the country's two large universities in Rangoon and Mandalay. Whereas they had been run by a council of professors, scholars and government officials the university councils were now put under direct government control. Some scholars suggest the main reason General Ne Win dissolved the university councils was his conviction that the close interdependence between politics and the higher education system lead to the interference of foreign ideologies in domestic Burmese politics.

In the following weeks, the intensity of the conflict increased slowly but steadily. On 18 June 1962, even tighter hostel rules were introduced stipulating, for example, that "the hostel doors were closed and locked up, prohibiting any student coming in or going out after 8 p.m. and the students had to sign the registerbook to ascertain that they were in."

These rules were intended to control the students' behaviour and to ensure they could not distribute anti-military regime materials on campus or in the city. However, the curfew cut off the students from their supper which mobile food vendors provided between 9:00 p.m. and 10:00 p.m. Consequently, they came on campus to offer their food to the students. The subsequent prohibition by the Burmese authorities of food sales on campus resulted in students going to bed hungry. Some scholars believe this was the trigger which would very soon overstretch the students' tolerance.

== Protests and crackdown ==
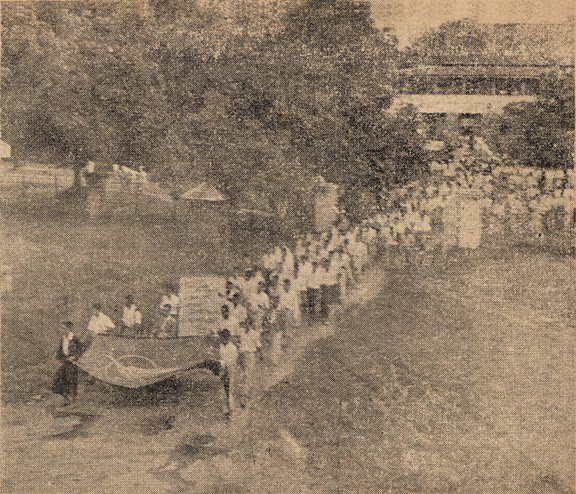
Students exiting Rangoon University Students' Union building at 2:00 p.m.

Students had already disregarded the 8:00 p.m. curfew for three consecutive nights by breaking through the closed hostel doors, when the Rangoon University Students' Union (RUSU) took over the lead on 6 July 1962. The president of the RUSU, Ba Swe, announced that they would hold a meeting at the RUSU building the next day to protest against the hostel regulations, which the students felt were highly unfair.

=== Student protests on the campus of Rangoon University on 7 July 1962 ===
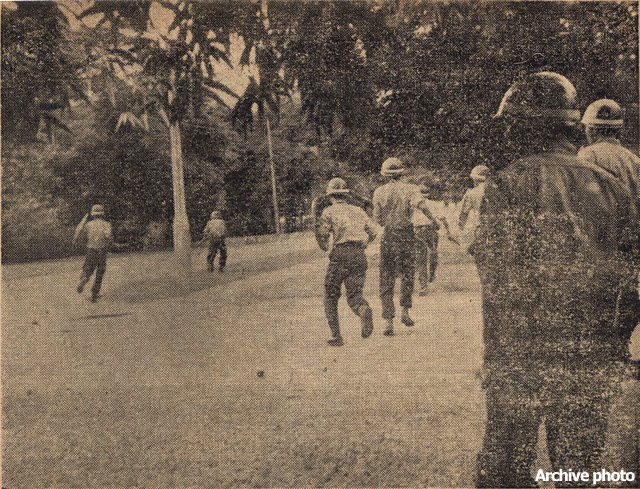
Riot police with batons crack down on demonstrators

On 7 July 1962, the students had discussed "unjust" hostel rules in the Assembly Hall of the RUSU building for about an hour, when some 2,000 students embarked on a peaceful protest march on the Rangoon University campus to announce they would continue to oppose military regime's hostel regulations. About an hour later, at 3:00 p.m., the protest dispersed and the students returned to their hostels and homes. However, leading members of the RUSU, including President Ba Swe, continued to discuss the matter of hostel regulations and define a strategy for the protests. In the following minutes a special dynamic evolved which would reveal for the first time the military regime's new tough stance against anti-regime actors challenging the government's claim for absolute domination. According to eyewitness reports, the police arrived with eight army jeeps and land-rovers, stormed the RUSU building, and arrested members of the RUSU, including the president. Students who fled the scene are said to have spread the news about the events. As a result, hundreds of students came out of their hostels and started to fight the police. The military regime sent in more police cars and started to spray tear gas at the students. They threw stones and lit fireworks whilst shouting offensive slogans targeted against General Ne Win. The events generally followed a pattern persistent since the first student protests emerged in colonial Burma. During past incidents of student demonstrations, the protests first centred around genuine student issues—in this case the new stricter hostel regulations. The student leaders then utilised existing momentum and transformed the dynamic into a general political protest against the Ne Win government. Some authors report that police cars were set on fire and some policemen were injured. However, in the absence of reliable sources, it remains unclear which side started the violent acts or how many students were already injured after this first clash. The military regime then hinted at its willingness to meet the student protest with firmness. Some hundreds to 2,000 soldiers from No. 4 Burmese Rifles Battalion, armed with G-3 rifles, surrounded the campus and took positions at around 5:30 p.m. After the students allegedly failed to comply with repeated requests by the military to disperse, Sein Lwin, who had arrived at the university only a couple of minutes before, presented an order to shoot the students. The unarmed students were shot at for less than thirty minutes. No one knows who gave the order to open fire. However, Aung Gyi and Tin Pe were the most senior officers at the time, and Sein Lwin was the field commanding officer in the university region. Later that evening, soldiers searched the student hostels and made further arrests. Official reports indicated that 15 students died and 27 were wounded. However, in Mandalay Hall alone more than 17 students died according to the official records. Reliable unofficial sources, however, speak of more than one hundred dead students in the deadliest event in the history of student protests in Burma to date. Additionally, it is estimated that some 3,000 students were arrested.

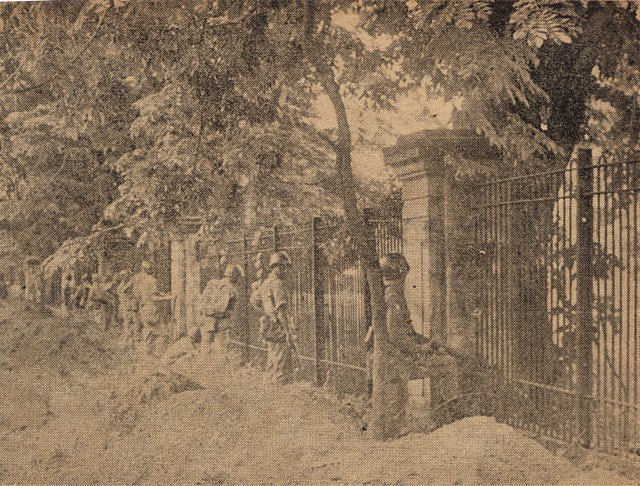

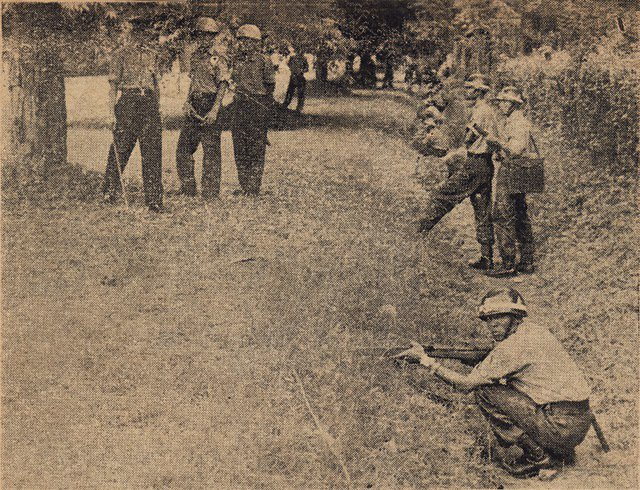
Burmese Army soldiers, armed with G-3 rifles, surrounded the campus and took positions at around 5:30 p.m.

Some authors put forward the argument the pronounced readiness of the government soldiers to shoot at the students can be attributed to a deeper, underlying ethnic and religious conflict. Purportedly, the soldiers were mostly members of the Chin, a predominantly Christian ethnic group located in the border region of Burma and India. They had little sympathy for the students in Rangoon, who had a largely urban Burmese Buddhist background.

=== General Ne Win’s state-of-the-nation address and the demolition of the Rangoon University Students' Union (RUSU) building ===
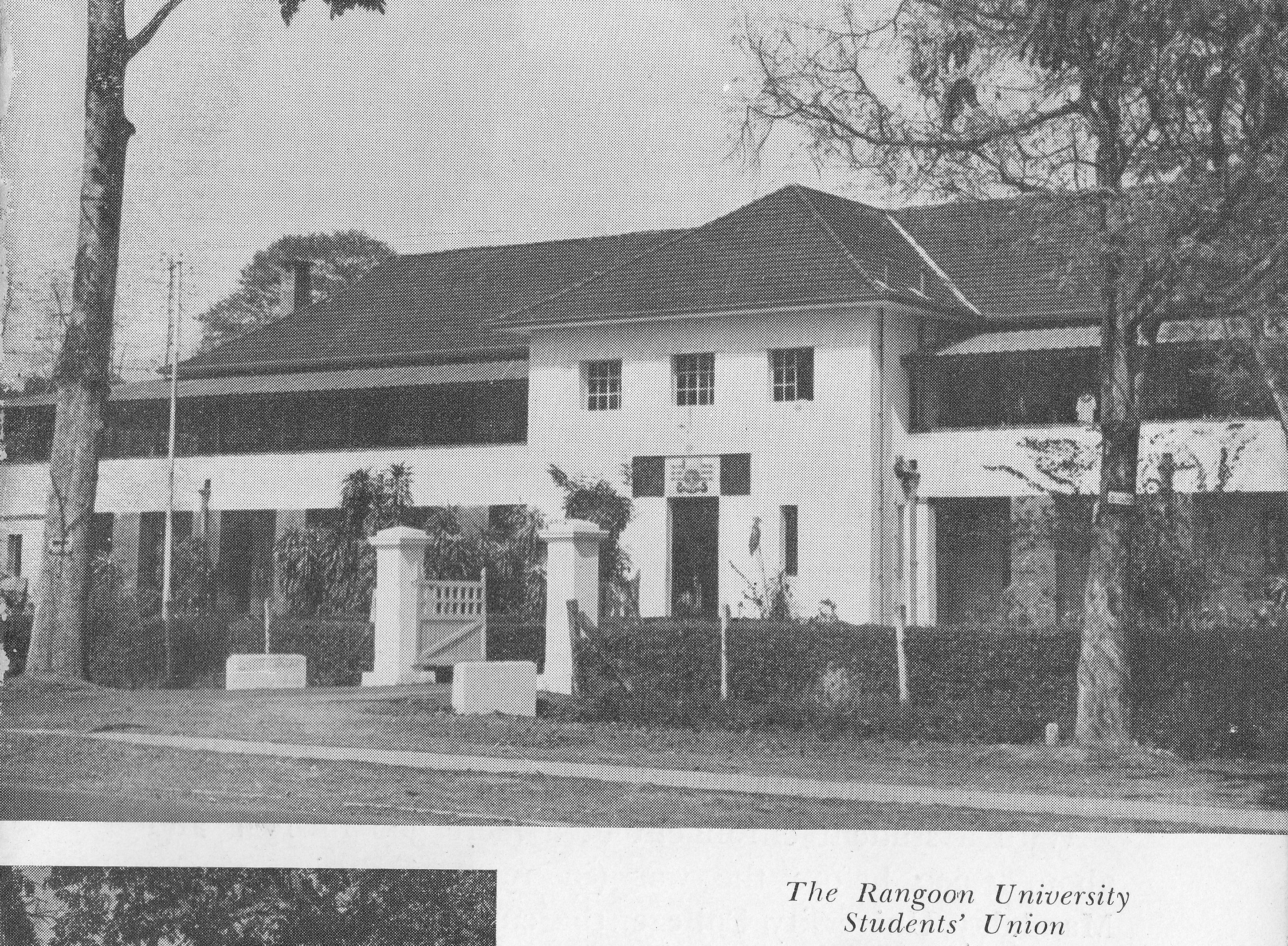
Last known photo of historic Rangoon University Students' Union building

Shortly afterward, Ne Win addressed the nation in a five-minute radio speech portraying the incident as the work of a treacherous group of communist students. He concluded his statement warning that "if these disturbances were made to challenge us, I have to declare that we will fight sword with sword and spear with spear". (Note: The Burmese phrase is "dah go dah gyin, hlan go hlan gyin" (ဓားကို ဓားခြင်း လှံကိုလှံခြင်း). Two different English translations of the speech can be read on the front page of the Rangoon Nation and the Rangoon Guardian of 9 July 1962. Part of The Nation's headline of 9 July 1962 read "General Ne Win States Give Us Time to Work: Obstructionists are Warned: Will Fight Sword with Sword".) Although the student protest had already ended, the next morning the military regime nonetheless demolished the historic RUSU building with dynamite at 6:00 a.m. on 8 July 1962. However, Ne Win would soon realise that this decision substantially undermined popular support for the regime. The RUSU building had been a symbol of Burmese nationalism ever since the anti-colonial nationalist struggle of the 1930s as it constituted the locus of the beginning of Burma's drive for independence. In this respect, the building was also "closely associated with the martyred Aung San", who is not only considered the Father of the Nation of modern independent Burma but was also a student leader in his youth. The act of destroying the symbolic RUSU building was a tangible sign of a break with this nationalist tradition, where a large segment of the Burmese elite shared national aspirations across party lines. It was capable of turning public opinion against the new military regime. Moreover, as some authors contend, the event also revealed that there was a new elite in power, recruited mainly from the military who disregarded this symbol of the former elite's shared identity.

== Evaluation of the military regime’s response to the student protests ==
The brutal crackdown on the student protests by the military regime of General Ne Win stood in stark contrast to the largely peaceful seizure of power in March. For the first time the new rulers showed their willingness to use massive force against their own people. In this regard the 1962 Rangoon University protests served as a visible sign of the military regime's tougher stance towards an open society. It set a "precedent for dealing with student protests by responding with force and school closures rather than negotiations". The crackdown also marked the end of a phase of overt student activism in Burma for a long time. Instead, Burmese students shifted political activities underground openly contesting the military regime only sporadically, especially during the U Thant funeral crisis in 1974 and the 8888 Uprising in 1988.

=== Undermining education as a channel for social mobility and elite recruitment ===
The new military regime of General Ne Win was faced with a particularly effective and expanding educational system in Burma, which was deemed one of the best in Asia in the 1930s and 1940s. Access to free education enabled broad sections of the Burmese society in the post-independence phase to climb the social ladder. Students exhibited enormously diverse socio-economic and ethnic backgrounds and entry into university was also increasingly granted to girls. Thus, personal advancement through education was one of the four major channels for social mobility in Burma at this time. In this regard, some authors argue that the crackdown on the student protests must be regarded as the first of many steps by the new military regime to close this classic channel for social mobility and elite recruitment in favour of recruitment through the military. Accordingly, attendance at the military college at Maymyo became the primary avenue into elite status.

=== Eliminating university students as competing sources of power ===
Moreover, closely linked to the military regime's attempt to close education as a primary channel of upward social mobility and elite recruitment was the broader strategy of eliminating university students as an independent source of power which could challenge the claim to power of the government of General Ne Win. Several factors contributed to the strength of the student movement. Firstly, the university campus offered the broadest democratic space within the entire Burmese society. Students had a distinct legacy of widely using this leeway to criticise several subsequent governments and influence national politics. Secondly, this shared history had fostered a strong sense of collective student identity. And, finally, students had regularly cooperated with other actors in Burmese society to increase their impact. Not only did they maintain close relations with the different political parties on the national level, but they also cooperated with farmers' and workers' unions. Thus, they were able to significantly expand their range of influence beyond the campus. Against this background, General Ne Win's hard line during the incidents on 7–8 July 1962 can be seen as a first pronounced step towards depoliticising the universities and ending this historical line of continuity existing since the 1920s, characterised by university students who filled the vacuum left by the political opposition and significantly influenced Burmese politics.

Thus, the reaction of the new military regime towards the student protests marked the beginning of an important line of continuity shaping the following decades, where the main target of subsequent Burmese governments was control not quality of education. Accordingly, and in the light of thirteen university shutdowns between 1962 and 1999, Fink contends that "the primary focus in the development of the university system has been the containment of student activism".

== Aftermath ==
Following the brutal suppression of the student protests all universities were immediately closed for four months and the students sent home. Public opinion significantly turned against the military regime partly because students returning to all parts of the country spread the news of the protests and the aftermath.

=== Student arrests and closure of universities in November 1963 ===
The new restrictive approach of the military regime in handling student demonstrations was reconfirmed in November 1963 when the Revolutionary Council once again arrested hundreds of students and their leaders and closed the universities after protests against the government's policies.

=== The 1964 University Education Act ===
Furthermore, the Ne Win government introduced comprehensive institutional reforms of tertiary education in Burma intended to place the country's universities under strict official control and to profoundly hamstring cohesive student activism. Formal student organisations operating on-campus were banned. On the one hand, the previously existing, political student organisations were dissolved. On the other hand, new non-political student associations devoted to non-contentious areas such as sports, social life and academic subject areas were established and placed under supervision of Security and Administration Committees (SACs). This served the Revolutionary Council's purpose to control subordinate administrative organisations. In 1964, the University Education Act further reduced the organisational capacities of Burma's universities and their status as a focal point for anti-government protest. General Ne Win's government had clearly recognised the danger posed by coherently organised universities and especially by students of the liberal arts. Hence, both Rangoon University and Mandalay University were divided into several autonomous institutes. In addition, an incentive system was introduced where—breaking with the legacy of the colonial past—high-performing students were directed towards practical subjects such as medicine and engineering, while underachieving students were guided towards the humanities and the liberal arts, which the regime considered as being rather subversive. But it also reflected the new government's approach to focus on industrial development through an educational emphasis on science. By that time, tertiary education in Burma produced a highly educated but increasingly unemployed elite, which could have posed a further threat to the regime.

=== The disappearance of open student activism ===
In response to the brutal suppression of student protests in July 1962, as well as the repressive behaviour of the military regime afterward, most students tacitly accepted their new non-political role assigned by the government. A small number of remaining dissident students, however, formed underground units not larger than ten persons and met within the circle of "private libraries, study groups and private teachers in order to study political developments in other countries and to learn more about resistance movements in Burma’s past". This reaction built on another tradition established during the colonial period since the 1920s. At that time private study groups dedicated to striving for independence met to learn from political literature to assist their anti-colonial struggle. However, strict surveillance and the tough stance of the military regime in the past spread the fear amongst dissidents of being discovered. As a result, the underground units remained small and unconnected "preventing them from becoming a larger network and a potential mobilizing structure". Instead, the students tried to uphold the memory of open collective student activism by circulating underground pamphlets, while they were waiting for suitable political opportunity structures to open for renewed student mass mobilisation. Other student activists, however, "joined the armed Communist Party in the jungle" and "participat[ed] in the guerrilla warfare conducted by rebel political and ethnic groups against the government".

=== The 1962 Rangoon University protests as focal point for later student activism ===
Scholars have stressed the importance of the 1962 Rangoon University protests as a formative event and focal point for later student activism against military rule in Burma. As a visible sign of the symbolic importance of the events as a reference point, "many Rangoon University students wore black or participated in furtive, nighttime demonstrations around campus" on the anniversary of the 7 July incident. General Ne Win himself was clearly aware of the symbolic power connected with the events. This was reflected by, among other things, his decision to release students detained during the beginning of the 8888 Uprising in March and June 1988, on 7 July anniversary. Furthermore, when Ne Win had to resign only a few weeks later because of the 8888 Uprising, he referred in his departure speech to the destruction of the RUSU building as "one of the key episodes" during his time in power. Moreover, Ne Win also explicitly denied any involvement in dynamiting of the Student Union building, stating that his deputy Brigadier Aung Gyi, who by that time had fallen out with Ne Win and been dismissed, had given the order without his approval and he had to take responsibility as a "revolutionary leader" by giving the sword with sword and spear with spear speech. Aung Gyi, in turn, "claimed that he merely delivered the order given by General Ne Win to the commander of the military company which eventually detonated the explosives that destroyed the union building." However, the conviction has gained ground among academic scholars that Ne Win in fact bears the ultimate responsibility for the destruction of the RUSU building.

== Bibliography ==
- Aung-Thwin, Maureen; Myint-U, Thant (1992). "The Burmese ways to socialism". Third World Quarterly. 13 (1): 67–75. doi:10.1080/01436599208420262.
- Boudreau, Vincent (2004). Resisting Dictatorship: Repression and Protest in Southeast Asia. Cambridge: Cambridge University Press. ISBN 978-0-521-83989-1.
- Charney, Michael W. (2009). A History of Modern Burma. Cambridge: Cambridge University Press. ISBN 978-0-521-61758-1.
- Clapp, Priscilla (2007). "Burma's Long Road to Democracy". United States Institute of Peace. Archived from the original on 7 August 2018.
- Fink, Christina (2009). Living Silence in Burma: Surviving under Military Rule (2nd ed.). London and New York: Zed Books. ISBN 978-1-84813-271-9.
- Hlaing, Kyaw Yin (2007a). "Associational Life in Myanmar: Past and Present". In Ganesan, N.; Hlaing, Kyaw Yin (eds.). Myanmar: State, Society and Ethnicity. Singapore: ISEAS Publishing. pp. 143–171. ISBN 9789812304346.
- Hlaing, Kyaw Yin (2007b). "The politics of state-society relations in Burma". South East Asia Research. 15 (2): 213–254. doi:10.5367/000000007781509571. S2CID 147657335.
- Hlaing, Kyaw Yin (2008). "Power and Factional Struggles in Post-Independence Burmese Governments". Journal of Southeast Asian Studies. 39 (1): 149–177. doi:10.1017/s0022463408000076. S2CID 145635235.
- Kyi, Khin Maung (2000). Economic Development of Burma: A Vision and a Strategy. Singapore: Singapore University Press. ISBN 978-918-883616-8.
- Koon-Hong, Dan Chan (2014). "Legacy of the Fighting Peacock: Analyzing the Role of Student Activism in Burmese Democratic Movements". Columbia University Journal of Politics & Society. 25 (2): 71–99.
- Maung, Mya (1992). Totalitarianism in Burma: Prospects for Economic Development. New York: Paragon House Publishers. ISBN 978-1-55778-553-4.
- Maung, Shew Lu (1989). Burma: Nationalism and Ideology. An Analysis of Society, Culture and Politics. Dhaka: University Press Limited. ISBN 978-9-840-51114-3. OCLC 20724594.
- Min, Win (2012). "Burma: A Historic Force, Forcefully Met". In Weiss, Meredith L.; Aspinall, Edward (eds.). Student Activism in Asia: Between Protest and Powerlessness. Minneapolis and London: University of Minnesota Press. pp. 181–204. ISBN 978-0-8166-7969-0.
- Myint-U, Thant (2006). The River of Lost Footsteps. New York: Farrar, Straus and Giroux. ISBN 9780374163426.
- Seekins, Donald M. (2011). State and Society in Modern Rangoon. Abingdon and New York: Routledge. ISBN 978-0-415-31852-5.
- Silverstein, Josef (1970). "Burmese and Malaysian Student Politics: A Preliminary Comparative Inquiry". Journal of Southeast Asian Studies. 1 (1): 3–22. doi:10.1017/s0022463400000047. S2CID 154607896.
- Silverstein, Josef (1977). Burma: Military Rule and the Politics of Stagnation. Ithaca and London: Cornell University Press. ISBN 978-0-8014-0911-0.
- Steinberg, David I. (1981). Burma's Road Toward Development: Growth and Ideology Under Military Rule. Boulder: Westview Press. ISBN 0-86531-224-9.
- Steinberg, David I. (1982). Burma, a socialist nation of Southeast Asia. Boulder: Westview Press. ISBN 978-0-86531-175-6.
- Taylor, Robert H. (1987). The State in Burma. London: C. Hurst & Company. ISBN 978-1-85065-028-7.
