= Thakin Kodaw Hmaing =

Burmese poet and politician (1876–1964)

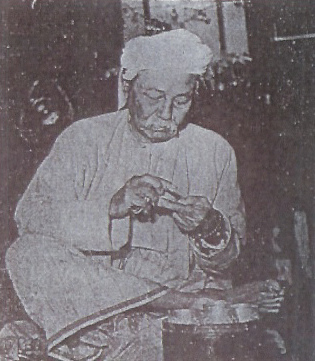
- Born: Maung Lun Maung; 23 March 1876; Walei Village, Prome District, Burma Province, British India
- Died: 23 July 1964 (aged 88); Rangoon, Burma
- Resting place: Kandawmin Garden Mausolea, Yangon, Burma (Myanmar)
- Occupations: dramatist, poet, journalist, politician
- Spouse: Ma Shin (1903–1913)
- Writing career
- Pen name: Pandi Lay, Maung Sammadi, Saya Lun, Bow Bow Aung, Mr. Maung Hmaing, Thakin Kodaw Hmaing
- Period: 1898–1964
- Genre: Nationalist
- Notable work: Mr. Maung Hmaing Hmadawbon Wuttu 1916
- Notable awards: Stalin Peace Prize (1954), Honorary Doctorate, University of Hamburg (1960)

Thakin Kodaw Hmaing (Burmese: သခင်ကိုယ်တော်မှိုင်း, pronounced [θəkʰɪ̀ɰ̃ kòdɔ̀ m̥áiɰ̃]; 23 March 1876 – 23 July 1964) is considered one of the greatest Burmese poets, writers and political leaders in the 20th century history of Burma. He is regarded as the Father of Burmese nationalist and peace movements as well as a literary genius. His legacy and influence on the post-war generations can still be felt in both literature and the ongoing political situation in Myanmar (Burma).

== Formative years ==
Hmaing was born Maung Lun Maung in Wale village near Shwedaung in Lower Burma. He was sent at an early age to be educated in the traditional manner in Mandalay, and at the age of 9 he witnessed the fall of the Konbaung dynasty and the abduction of King Thibaw and Queen Supayalat by the British, being taken away in a carriage, near the queen's own Myadaung Monastery where he was a boarder. It was a scene that he would never forget and one that sparked his nationalist fervour in a lifelong struggle for independence.

== Literary genius ==
In 1894 Hmaing moved to Rangoon (now Yangon) to start his career as a playwright, and switched to journalism, later on writing articles for a newspaper in Moulmein (now Mawlamyaing). In 1903 he married Ma Shin whom he had met in Rangoon before moving to Moulmein, and returned to the capital as the nationalist movement was gaining momentum in 1911 to work for the Thuriya (Sun) newspaper. Writing under his own name Maung Lun or Saya Lun, he had already reached a wide audience by now through traditional stage plays written in verse and based on historical Burmese myth and legend. He contributed regularly to the paper and other publications such as the Dagon magazine where he later became an editor.

His mastery of classical Burmese literature enabled him to write extensively in verse with such ease and flair that future generations of writers still find hard to match. A genius in multiple and complex rhyme, here is one of his couplets that has often been quoted: Kaung myo ahtweidwei yenè chunzei myazei saw, daung owei yelo tunzei kazei thaw (ကောင်းမျိုးအထွေထွေ ရယ်နဲ့ ချွန်စေမြစေစော ဒေါင်းအိုးဝေရယ်လို့ တွန်စေကစေသော) - "May a myriad good things with vigour have a chance; may the peacock have its call and dance". The dancing peacock (ကဒေါင်း, ka daung) was the emblem of Burmese sovereignty featured on pennants, coins and currency notes, whereas the fighting peacock (ခွပ်ဒေါင်း, hkut daung) is the emblem of Burmese student unions. Owei is the call of the peacock and was also the title of the Rangoon University Students Union (RUSU) magazine.

Hmaing also wrote in mixed verse and prose style brilliantly presenting satires in the form of learned religious commentaries, called htikas (ဋီကာ) in Pali, such as Hkway htika (On Dogs) in which he castigated politicians for wasting their time and effort in futile squabbling when they should be concentrating on the fight against colonial rule.

1. Kja htika- On Lotus 1912
2. Bo htika - On Chiefs 1914
3. Daung htika - On Peacocks 1920
4. Sone nadha myaing htika- On Full of Fragrance Forest Quest Poem 1921
5. Myauk htika - On Monkeys 1923
6. Hkway htika - On Dogs 1925
7. Mjin htika - On Horse 1925
8. Swaraj htika- On Swaraj 1925
9. Hse gadei kyaw htika- On Over Hundred Million 1926
10. Boingkauk htika - On Boycott 1927
11. Galonbyan dipani htika - On the Flying Garuda 1931
12. Thakin htika - On Thakins 1938
13. Nagani htia- On Red Dragon 1940

== Mr Maung Hmaing ==
A novel titled Missata Maung Hmaing hmadawbon wuttu (the Epistles of Mr Maung Hmaing) written under the pseudonym Mr Maung Hmaing in 1916 immediately caused a furore which was also the intended effect. Maung Hmaing was the name of the main character, a Casanova-like scoundrel, in a popular novel at the time called Chinbaungywet the Maung Hmaing (The Roselle Vendor Maung Hmaing) by U Kyee (1848–1908), and Hmaing by taking his name and styling himself Mister at the same time was mocking the affectation among some fashionable Anglophile Burmese who had started putting Mr in front of their names. It did stop the trend. And the name stuck.

== National leader ==
Hmaing joined the nationalist Dobama Asiayone (We Burmans Association) in 1934 and quickly rose to become the leader of young Thakins - a title that proclaimed they were the true masters of their own land, not the British who had usurped the title. He thus came to be known as Thakin Kodaw Hmaing (Master Lord Hmaing), and later Sayagyi (great teacher) Thakin Kodaw Hmaing.

He is also considered to be unequalled in another traditional form of poetry called Laygyo gyi (လေးချိုးကြီး) which he revived to great effect by giving it a new content of contemporary political issues. Hmaing inspired a whole generation of Burmese nationalists in the fight for independence, fostering immense pride in their own history, language and culture, and more importantly urging them to take direct action such as strikes by students and workers, the subject of Boingkauk htika (On Boycott). He showed no mercy to those who were mere political opportunists either, as in Hkway htika (On Dogs). His allusive and highly memorable style of verse made him very popular with the Burmese public and shielded his work from colonial government censorship.

In the wake of the second university students strike in history of 1936 when the All Burma Students Union (ABSU) was formed, Hmaing was elected its patron. By 1941 his reputation as a leading nationalist earned him a place on the colonial authorities' 'Burma List', regarded as an 'enemy of the state'. It was Hmaing along with other leaders of the Dobama who sent Aung San and other young men - later known as the 'Thirty Comrades' - to seek military training abroad in order to fight the British.

== Peace activist ==
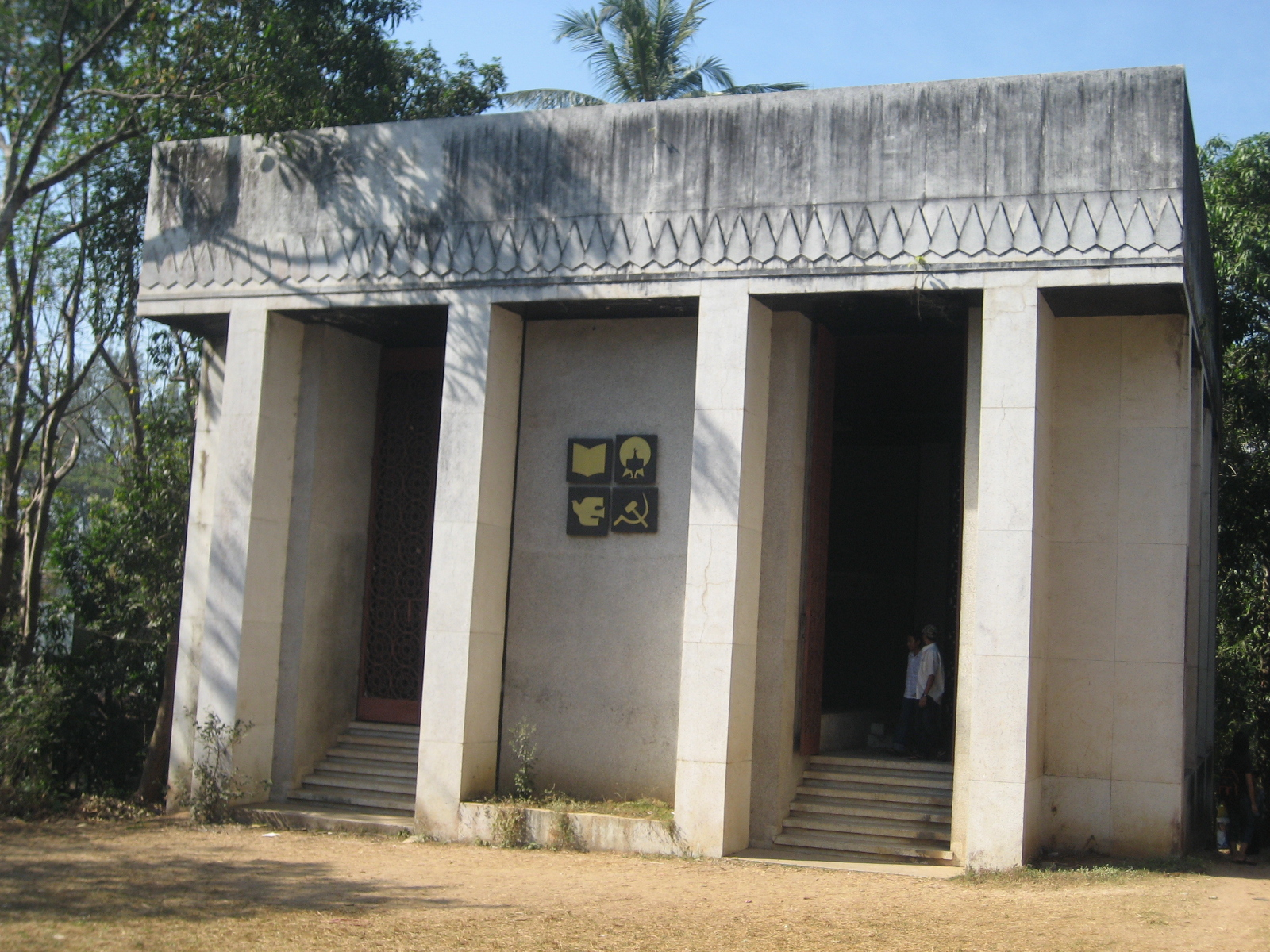
Thakin Kodaw Hmaing's mausoleum on Shwedagon Pagoda Road, Yangon

After independence in 1948 the country immediately plunged into a widespread civil war which caused great sorrow to Hmaing, and he spent the rest of his life trying to bring internal peace to the land. He was a leading light in the world peace movement in Burma, and in 1952 attended the Peace Conference for Asia Pacific Region in Peking. He was elected Chairman of the World Peace Congress (Burma) the same year, and won the Stalin Peace Prize in 1954. Hmaing also travelled to People's Republic of China, Mongolia, Hungary and the Soviet Union in 1953, and went to Ceylon and India for the World Peace Conference in 1957. He was awarded an honorary doctorate in 1960 by the University of Hamburg, West Germany.

Thakin Kodaw Hmaing gave his active support together with the former Brig.General Kyaw Zaw to the Internal Peace Committee during the 1963 peace parley between the Union Revolutionary Council government of Ne Win and various armed rebel groups including the Communist Party of Burma, Red Flag Communists, and ethnic minorities. Hmaing's was the one voice that all parties across the political divide would listen to with respect, and remained the only alternative political voice the military could not silence, after they took power in 1962, until his death at the age of 88 in 1964 when all political parties except the ruling Burma Socialist Programme Party (BSPP) were abolished by decree.

He devoted his time to peace and national reconciliation with less time for writing towards the end of his life, stating that his last wish was to see a peaceful and united country. He was buried at Kandawmin Garden Mausolea near the Shwedagon Pagoda, and on March 23, 1976, the centenary of Hmaing's birth (Hmaing yabyei), over 100 students were arrested for holding a peaceful ceremony at his mausoleum.

Thakin Kodaw Hmaing was, in Anna Allott's words, "a man of many skills - a true Buddhist and a staunch patriot; poet and playwright; historian and teacher; pioneer writer and satirist - Thakin Kodaw Hmaing is the single most revered literary figure in modern Burma".
