= Shan United Revolutionary Army =

Burmese insurgent group

- ရှမ်းပြည်နယ်တပ်ပေါင်းစုတော်လှန်ရေးတပ်မတော်
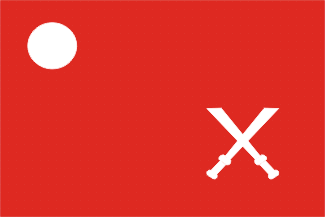
- Flag of the Shan United Revolutionary Army
- Leaders: Mo Heng; Khun Sa; Yawd Serk
- Dates active: 1959 -1996
- Headquarters: Homong, Shan State
- Active regions: Shan State
- Ideology: Shan nationalism; Separatism; Anti-communism
- Part of: Mong Tai Army
- Wars: the Internal conflict in Myanmar

The Shan United Revolutionary Army (Burmese: ရှမ်းပြည်နယ်တပ်ပေါင်းစုတော်လှန်ရေးတပ်မတော်; abbreviated SURA) or Tai Revolutionary Council (TRC) was a Shan insurgent group in Myanmar (Burma), led by Moh Heng.

== History ==
The SURA was formed in the 1959 by Moh Heng, who earlier formed the Shan State Communist Party in 1956.

The SURA however took anti-communist position due to its close links with the KMT. According to former SSA commander, Chao Tzang Yawnghwe, Mo Heng rejected overtures to form a united front on the basis of purported CPB influence within the SSPP. Chao Tzang Yawnghwe claims the real reason was that a united Shan front threatened the positions of ethnic Chinese smugglers and financiers who funded SURA. In 1984, it merged with the anti-communist 2nd Brigade of the Shan State Army to form the Tai Revolutionary Council (TRC) when the 2nd Brigade headquarters was overrun by Khun Sa's Shan United Army (SUA).

In early 1985 its headquarters at Piang Luang came under pressure from the SUA as the latter sought to consolidate control over the border area. The TRC then ended its relationship the KMT, and allied itself with the SUA, to create the Mong Tai Army with its base of operations in Homong. In 1996 most of its soldiers disarmed, but a group of 800 soldiers were integrated into the newly formed Shan State Army – South by Yawd Serk.

== See also ==
- Mong Tai Army
- Opium production in Myanmar
