= Mong Tai Army =

Insurgent group in Myanmar

- မိုင်းတိုင်းတပ်မတော်၊ တပ်ႉသိုၵ်းမိူင်းတႆး
- Flag of the Mong Tai Army - The organization also used the flag of Shan State
- Leader: Khun Sa
- Dates active: 1985–1996
- Headquarters: Ho Mong, Langkho District
- Active regions: Shan State, Myanmar
- Ideology: Shan nationalism Separatism
- Size: 20,000
- Wars: the Internal conflict in Myanmar

The Mong Tai Army (Burmese: မိုင်းတိုင်းတပ်မတော်; sometimes transcribed Muang Tai Army; abbreviated MTA), was an insurgent group consisting of soldiers from the Shan minority in Myanmar, founded in 1985 by Khun Sa. It had up to 20,000 armed troops at its peak, and was one of the largest forces opposing the government of Myanmar at its time. It was also involved in drug trafficking in Southeast Asia.

The MTA had its headquarters in Ho Mong (Homein), Langkho District, a village near the border of Mae Hong Son Province.

== History ==
The Mong Tai Army was founded in 1985, after the merging of two rebel factions; Khun Sa's Shan United Army (SUA) and Moh Heng's "Tai Revolutionary Council" faction of the Shan United Revolutionary Army (SURA). It was officially renamed to the MTA in 1987. Despite officially stating that their goal is ultimately independence for Shan State, both groups have been accused of acting as private armies for Shan warlords (Khun Sa and Moh Heng, respectively). They have both also been accused of being heavily involved in the drug trade in the Golden Triangle, an area that produces millions of dollars of opium every year.

In the 1990s, the Mong Tai Army had a peak strength of 20,000 soldiers. After heavy battles against the Tatmadaw (Myanmar Armed Forces) between 1993 and 1995, tensions grew between the Shan nationalist field officers and the Chinese leaders. Shan nationalists wanted to achieve an independent state for the Shan minority, while the Chinese leaders were more interested in the illicit opium trade and the money that it earned.

Until 1996, the Mong Tai Army was also fighting the United Wa State Army (UWSA), something which benefited Tatmadaw forces in the area. During their fighting, the USWA managed to occupy two large swathes of territory near the Thai border, north and south of the city of Kengtung.

On 7 July 1995, an internal dispute broke out within the Mong Tai Army, and 8,000 fighters under the command of Colonel Yod Kan and Dae Wain retreated into the village of Hsipaw, where they built a new base. They renamed themselves the Shan State National Army, and the group intended to negotiate a ceasefire agreement with government forces. Khun Sa claimed that the source of the dispute was that the soldiers who left did not want to fight for a leader with multiple goals. However, the soldiers claimed that the drug profits went only to Khun Sa, and that civilian casualties were the highest in fighting between the Mong Tai Army and government forces because of a lack of leadership. Thousands died as a direct result from fighting between the Mong Tai Army and government forces.

A majority of the Mong Tai Army laid down their arms and surrendered to government forces in 1995, but around 3,000 split and formed a new faction of the Shan United Revolutionary Army, which later renamed to the Shan State Army - South (SSA-S). According to the State Law and Order Restoration Council (SLORC), the terms of the surrender stipulated that in return for ending his insurgency and surrendering his weaponry, Khun Sa would be allowed to live under close government supervision in Yangon (Rangoon), where he would be allowed to engage indirectly, through third-party investors, in legitimate business operations and he would not be prosecuted for his trafficking activities or be extradited to the US. Khun Sa was not only pardoned by the government, but received the title of "honored elder", and was allowed to live out the remainder of his life in Yangon, where he died in 2007.

== Drug trafficking ==
Khun Sa has frequently claimed that the Mong Tai Army was not about the drug trade or making profits from drug trafficking, and claimed that in fact, they were strongly opposed to opium. However, it is reported that Khun Sa once offered to sell his army's entire opium supply to the US government, an offer which was refused. In 1989, Khun Sa was charged by a New York court for trying to import 1,000 tonnes of heroin into the US, with the US DEA offering a $2,000,000 bounty for his arrest.

== See also ==
- List of rebel groups in Myanmar
- Opium production in Burma
