= Shan United Army =

Shan nationalist militia in Burma (Myanmar) during the 1970s

Shan United Army (SUA) was a Shan militia group formed by Khun Sa. Originally formed in 1964 as the Anti-Socialist United Army (ASUA) Ka Kwe Ye,Kuomintang remnants formed an alliance with ASUA under covert Thai government support. ASUA then regrouped in Ban Hin Taek, northern Thailand. This allowed control over the smuggling of opiates in the Golden Triangle and access to sophisticated weaponry originating from black markets in Laos and Thailand. According to Khun Sa, the ASUA rivaled the Tatmadaw in equipment until its defeat by the Royal Lao Army in the 1967 Opium War. After making contact with the Shan State Army, ASUA changed its name to SUA to reflect a Shan nationalist orientation during the 1970s. In 1985, the group merged with the Tai Revolutionary Council led by Moh Heng to create the Mong Tai Army.
