= Myanmar conflict =

Ongoing armed conflict in Southeast Asia

- Military situation in Myanmar as of 12 August 2026. Areas controlled by the Tatmadaw are highlighted in red. For a live map, see here.
Date	2 April 1948 – present (78 years, 7 months, 2 weeks and 1 day)
Location	Myanmar (with spillovers into neighbouring countries)
Status	Ongoing

Combatants
Union of Burma (1948–1962); Socialist Republic of the Union of Burma (1962–1988); Union of Myanmar (1988–2011); Republic of the Union of Myanmar (since 2011)	Ethnic armed organisations (Note: The government of Myanmar refers to all insurgent groups as "ethnic armed organisations", including groups like the People's Defense Force, All Burma Students' Democratic Front and Communist Party of Burma, which do not fight for a specific ethnic group's interests.)

Units involved
Tatmadaw (full list)	Various (full list)

Strength
150,000 (2023 USIP estimate)	Total number of fighters unknown (Note: For the number of fighters in a specific group, see List of ethnic armed organisations.)

Casualties and losses
- 180,000+ killed (Note: 130,000 (1948–2011); 53,000+ (since 2011)); 600,000–1,000,000 internally displaced

Myanmar has been in armed conflict since 1948, when the country, then known as Burma, gained independence from the United Kingdom. The conflict has largely been ethnic-based, with ethnic armed organisations fighting Myanmar's armed forces, the Tatmadaw, for self-determination. Despite numerous ceasefires and the creation of autonomous self-administered zones in 2008, armed groups continue to call for independence, increased autonomy, democracy, or the federalisation of Myanmar. It is the world's longest-running civil war.

In 1940, during World War II, Burmese intellectuals formed the Thirty Comrades, who established the Burma Independence Army (BIA) to fight against the Allies. Aung San led the Axis-puppet State of Burma before switching sides to the Allies in mid-1944. Post-war negotiations led to Burma's independence in 1948, but ethnic tensions arose after the Burmese government refused to honour the 1947 Panglong Agreement, which promised autonomy for some of the country's ethnic minorities. In the immediate post-independence period, the Communist Party of Burma (CPB) and the Karen National Union (KNU) emerged as major rebel forces.

In 1962, Burmese general Ne Win led a military coup, establishing a junta and refusing to adopt a federal system of governance, which led to intensified insurgencies. Ne Win's regime faced internal dissent and growing civil conflict throughout his rule, culminating in the 8888 Uprising in 1988, which was violently suppressed by the military. Following the uprising, the military established the State Law and Order Restoration Council (SLORC), later renamed the State Peace and Development Council (SPDC).

Civilian rule was restored in 2011, albeit not fully, with the military retaining power in the country's legislature through a new constitution. A military coup in 2021 by commander-in-chief Min Aung Hlaing deposed the civilian government, sparking widespread protests and escalating insurgencies.

== Prelude ==
In 1940, during World War II, a group of young Burmese intellectuals left for Japan to receive military training in preparation for an anti-colonial struggle against the British. This group came to be known as the Thirty Comrades, and upon returning to Burma in 1941, they established the Burma Independence Army (BIA) to fight against the Allies. Upon their capture of Rangoon in 1942, the Japanese established a puppet state, the State of Burma, and reorganised the BIA as its armed forces, the Burma National Army (BNA). Aung San, the leader of the State of Burma and one of the Thirty Comrades, became increasingly sceptical of Japan's ability to win the war as time progressed, and in mid-1944 he decided to switch sides. Japanese forces capitulated by July 1945, and the British began to negotiate Burma's independence with Aung San and other prominent Burmese leaders.

In the lead up to Burmese independence, Aung San negotiated with Chin, Kachin, and Shan leaders, and the Panglong Agreement was reached between them. The agreement promised full autonomy for the areas inhabited by the three ethnic minorities, with an option to secede from Burma ten years after independence. However, Aung San was assassinated shortly afterwards, and the Panglong Agreement was not honoured by the post-independence government under U Nu. This further strained relations between the Bamar ethnic majority and the country's many ethnic minorities.

== Course of the conflict ==
=== Post-independence insurgencies (1948–1962) ===
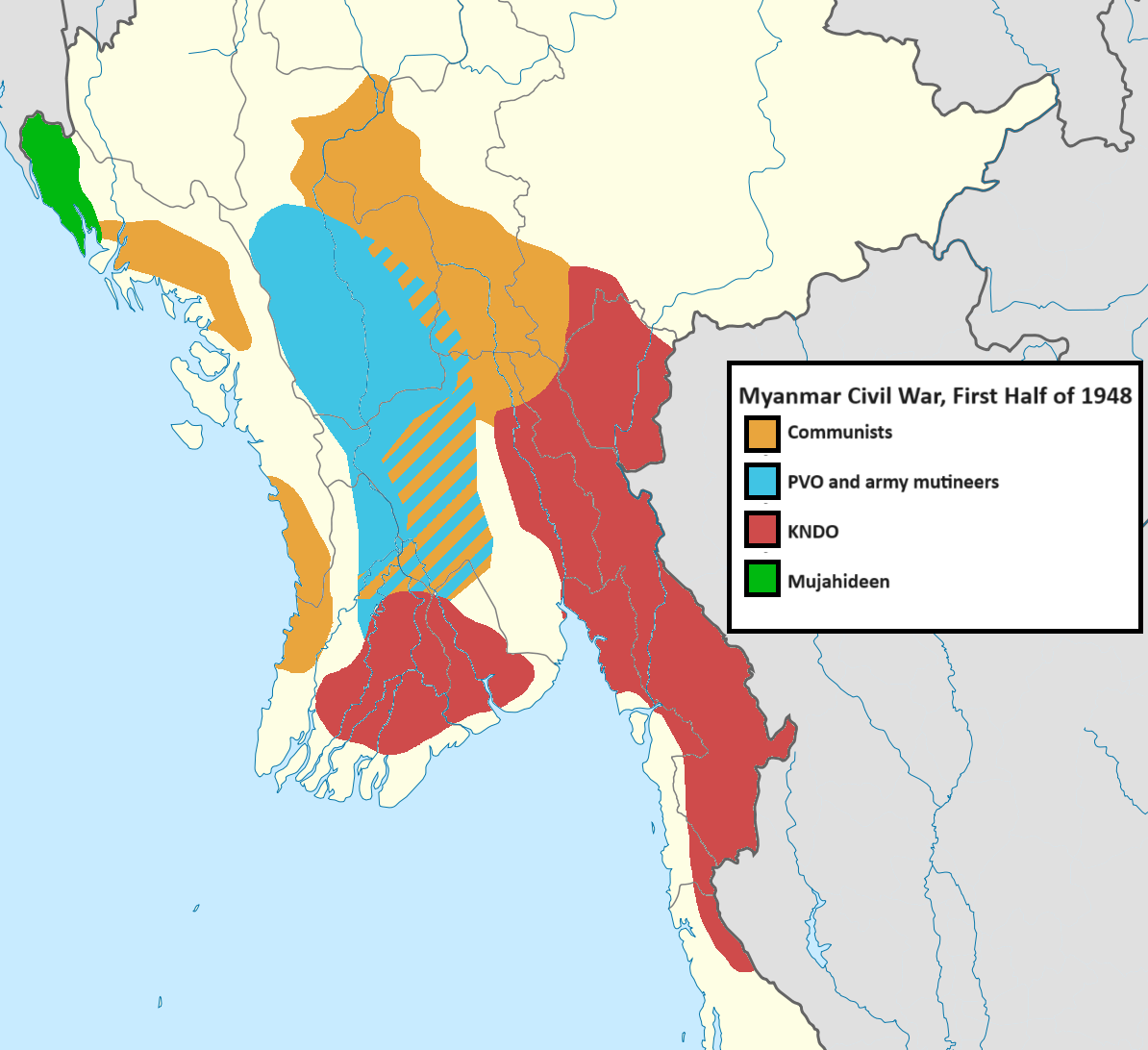
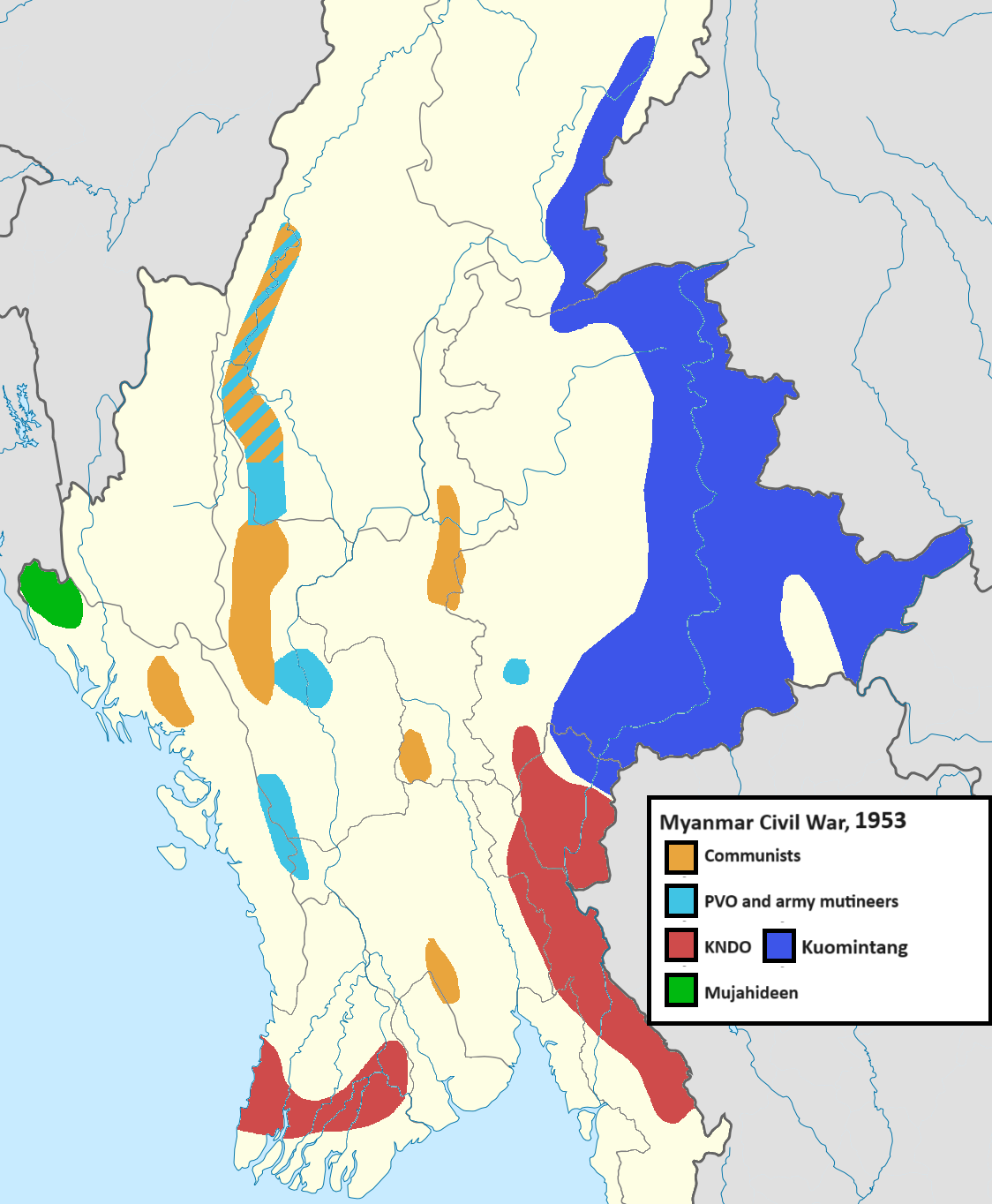
Map of insurgent activity in Burma in 1948 (top) and 1953 (bottom)

Following Burma's independence from the United Kingdom on 4 January 1948, the two largest opposition groups in the country were the communists, led by the Communist Party of Burma (CPB), and the Karen nationalists, led by the Karen National Union (KNU).

Initially there was calm during the transitional period after independence, but on 2 April 1948, the CPB fired the first shots of the conflict in Paukkongyi, Pegu Region (present-day Bago Region). At its peak, the CPB had 15,000 fighters in 1949.

During the post-independence period, the KNU favoured an independent state, governed by the Karen people. The proposed state would have encompassed the territories of Karen State and Karenni State (present-day Kayin State and Kayah State), in Lower Burma (Outer Myanmar). The KNU later shifted its focus from full independence to regional autonomy, under a federal system with fair Karen representation in the government.

=== Ne Win's dictatorship (1962–1988) ===
After three successive parliamentary governments governed Myanmar, the Tatmadaw, led by General Ne Win, staged a coup d'état on 2 March 1962, which ousted the parliamentary government and replaced it with a military junta. Accusations of severe human rights abuses and violations followed, and the cabinet of the parliamentary government and political leaders of ethnic minority groups were arrested and detained without trial. Around this period, other ethnic minority groups began forming larger rebel factions, such as the Kachin Independence Army, in response to the new government's refusal to adopt a federal system.

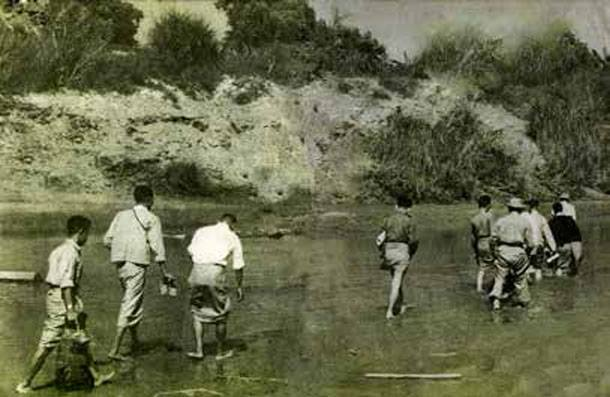
"They have gone back": Members of the CPB's delegation to the failed 1963 peace talks, returning to their bases by foot, c. November 1963.

Many insurgent groups, communist and ethnonationalist alike, became increasingly receptive to the Maoist concept of a "people's war" after failed peace talks with Ne Win's government in 1963. The CPB maintained close relations with the Chinese Communist Party (CCP) and replicated China's Cultural Revolution. The CPB's imitation of their Chinese allies was perceived by many Burmese as an attempt by China to intrude into Burmese affairs, a sentiment which led to the violent 1967 anti-Chinese riots in Burma. By the time the riots were quelled, 31 Chinese civilians had been killed and several Chinese-owned businesses had been burned down.

Both immediately after the coup and again in 1972, Ne Win held peace talks with several insurgent groups, but both times they fell apart. This was partly due to Ne Win's refusal to adopt a federal multi-party system. After negotiations failed, defectors from the Tatmadaw and ethnic insurgents walked back to their bases, with headlines across Myanmar famously reading "They have gone back" (သူတို့ပြန်ကြလေပြီ). Private property was confiscated by the government, and the Burmese Socialist Programme Party (BSPP) was founded in 1974 to govern the country under a one-party system. Under Ne Win's 26-year dictatorship, Myanmar became an isolated hermit kingdom and one of the least developed countries in the world. In 1988, nationwide student protests resulted in the BSPP and Ne Win being ousted and replaced with a new military regime, the State Peace and Development Council.

=== 8888 Uprising ===
On 12 March 1988, students began demonstrating in Rangoon (present-day Yangon) against the totalitarian rule of Ne Win and his Burma Socialist Programme Party (BSPP). The protests quickly spread across the country, and the BSPP government was eventually pressured into adopting a multi-party system. However, the BSPP government was overthrown in a military coup d'état on 18 September 1988. The military then established the State Law and Order Restoration Council (SLORC) and violently cracked down on protesters, ending all demonstrations by 21 September 1988.

Authorities in Myanmar claimed that around 350 people were killed, while opposition groups claimed thousands died in the protests at the hands of the military. According to The Economist, over 3,000 people were killed in the demonstrations. Despite its violent suppression of the 8888 Uprising, the new military junta agreed to ceasefire agreements with certain insurgent groups after the demonstrations ceased.

Aung San Suu Kyi emerged from the 8888 Uprising as a symbol of Myanmar's pro-democracy movement, leading the country's largest opposition party, the National League for Democracy (NLD). The military junta arranged a general election in 1990 to elect members of a parliament-sized constitutional committee which would draft a new constitution. The NLD won a supermajority of the seats, but the military junta, surprised by the outcome, refused to recognise the results and placed Aung San Suu Kyi under house arrest.

=== SLORC / SPDC junta (1988–2011) ===
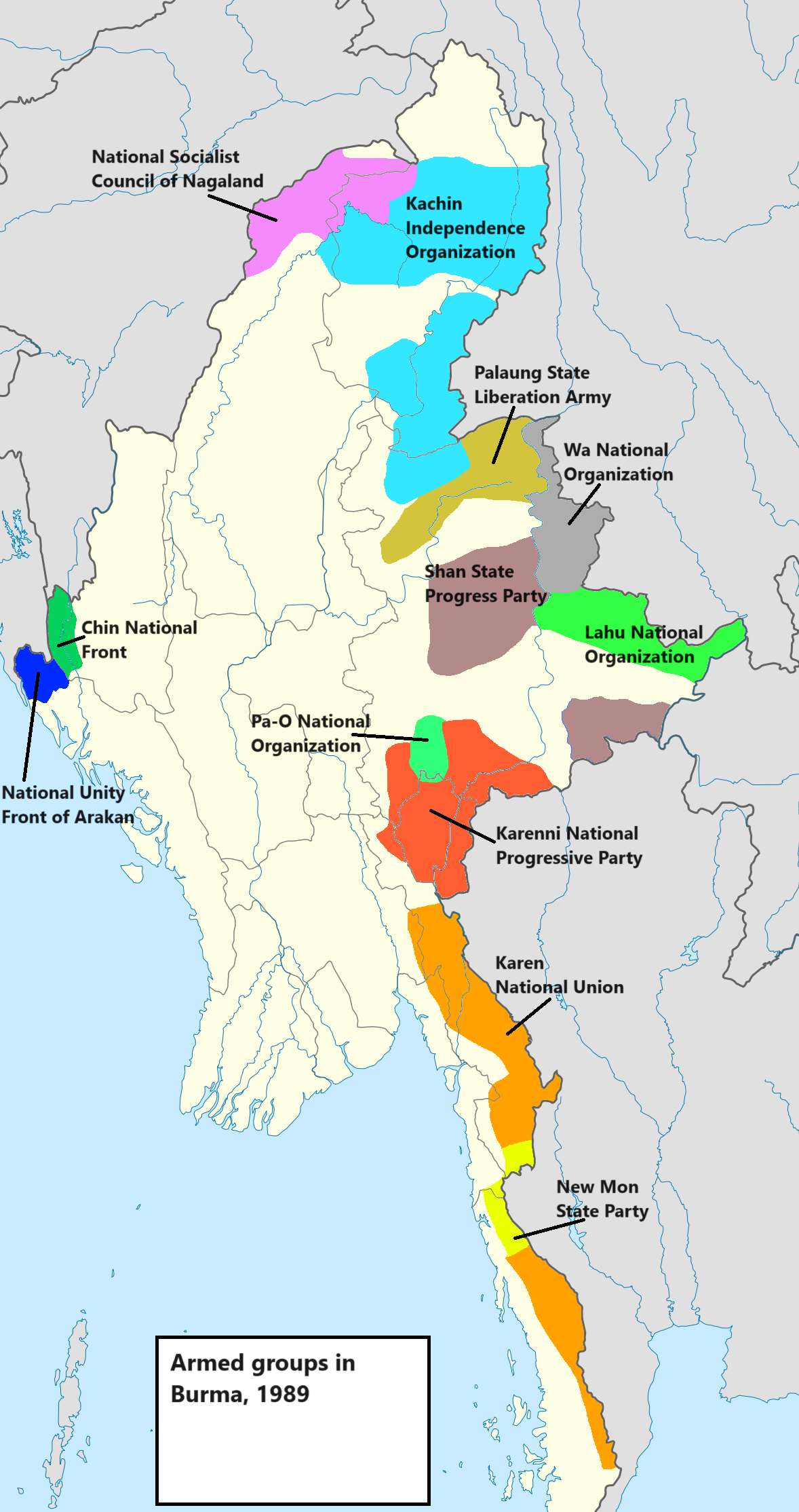
Map of insurgent activity in Burma in 1989

After voiding the results of the 1990 election, the military junta consolidated its rule over Myanmar. The SLORC was abolished in 1997 and replaced with the State Peace and Development Council (SPDC), which consisted of eleven senior military officers.

In the 1990s, the Tatmadaw severely weakened ethnic insurgent groups, destroying most of their bases and strongholds.

In 2006, the Tatmadaw launched a large-scale military offensive against the KNU's armed wing, the Karen National Liberation Army (KNLA). The clashes resulted in the displacement of hundreds of thousands of civilians in Kayin State. According to one estimate, approximately half a million people were displaced due to fighting between government forces and the KNU, and the forcible relocation of villages by the government.

In 2007, hundreds of thousands of monks protested against the military junta's rule, and called for free elections, minority rights and the release of political prisoners in an event now known as the Saffron Revolution. The protest originally began in response to the government's removal of price subsidies for compressed natural gas.

The Tatmadaw attacked Kokang in 2009, causing the Myanmar National Democratic Alliance Army to lose control of the area and forcing 30,000 refugees to flee to neighbouring Yunnan, China.

In 2010, Tatmadaw forces clashed violently with DKBA-5, resulting in nearly 10,000 refugees fleeing to Thailand to escape the violent conflict.

=== Civilian government (2011–2021) ===
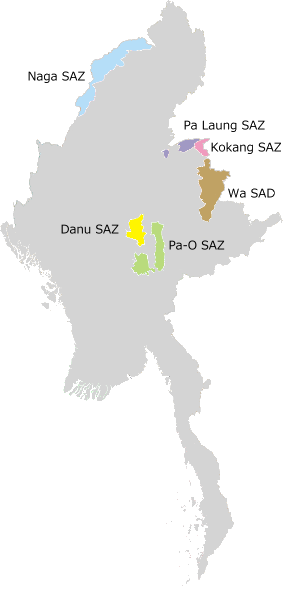
The five self-administered zones and one self-administered division created by the 2008 constitution.

The government introduced a new constitution in 2008 and instigated a period of political reforms from 2011 to 2015, with thousands of political prisoners being released, including Aung San Suu Kyi. The 2008 constitution created five self-administered zones and one self-administered division for six ethnic minority groups. In November 2014, the NLD attempted to make amendments to the constitution, in response to a clause that made Aung San Suu Kyi ineligible to become President of Myanmar if her party won an election. These amendments, however, were rejected.

In 2013, large anti-Muslim riots flared up in various cities across Myanmar. The violence coincided with the rise of the Buddhist nationalist 969 Movement, led by Sayadaw U Wirathu.

In early 2015, the Burmese government invited 15 insurgent groups to negotiate a "Nationwide Ceasefire Agreement". The draft was agreed upon by a majority of the invited parties on 31 March 2015, and the agreement was signed by Burmese president Thein Sein and the leaders of eight insurgent groups on 15 October 2015.

In Shan State, the military continued to engage the MNDAA during the 2015 Kokang offensive.

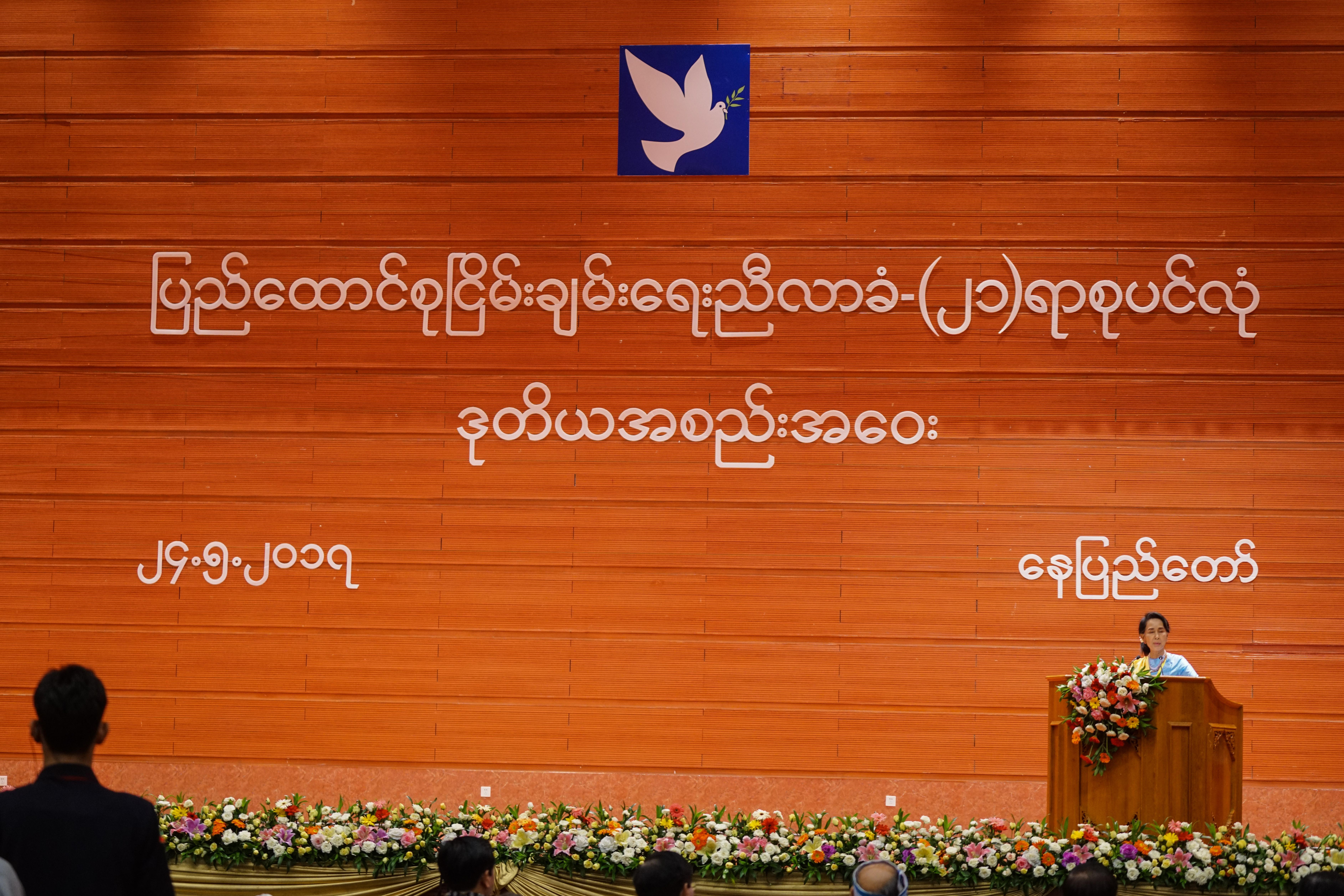
State Counsellor Aung San Suu Kyi makes her opening speech at the second session of the Union Peace Conference – 21st Century Panglong, 24 May 2017.

After the end of political reforms in 2015, the government began hosting a number of peace conferences, including the Union Peace Conference – 21st Century Panglong. The first session of the conference was held in 2016, with three follow-up sessions held in 2017, 2018, and 2020. The conference was criticised by opposition groups, including some attendees, for not addressing the main proposals made by ceasefire groups, and for excluding the country's largest insurgent groups which remained actively hostile. Critics further argued that Myanmar's constitution granted too much power to the military, and was preventing the country from achieving peace and meaningful democratic reforms.

On 9 October 2016, the Arakan Rohingya Salvation Army (ARSA) launched its first attack on Burmese border posts along the Bangladesh–Myanmar border, killing nine border officers. This prompted the Tatmadaw to begin massive "clearance operations" in northern Rakhine State, which intensified following a second large-scale attack by ARSA on 25 August 2017. The subsequent violence has sparked international outcry and was described as an ethnic cleansing by the United Nations High Commissioner for Human Rights.

In late November 2016, the Northern Alliance—which consists of four insurgent groups, the Arakan Army (AA), the Kachin Independence Army (KIA), the Myanmar National Democratic Alliance Army (MNDAA) and the Ta'ang National Liberation Army (TNLA)—attacked towns and border posts along the China–Myanmar border in Muse Township, northern Shan State. The insurgents captured the town of Mong Ko on 25 November 2016 and maintained control of it until they withdrew from the town on 4 December 2016 to avoid civilian casualties from airstrikes by the Myanmar Air Force.

On 15 August 2019, Northern Alliance insurgents attacked a military college in Nawnghkio Township, killing 15. Further clashes occurred in the following days, with Myanmar's military warning there could be a "full-scale war" in Shan State if the Northern Alliance did not halt their attacks.

=== SAC junta (2021–present) ===
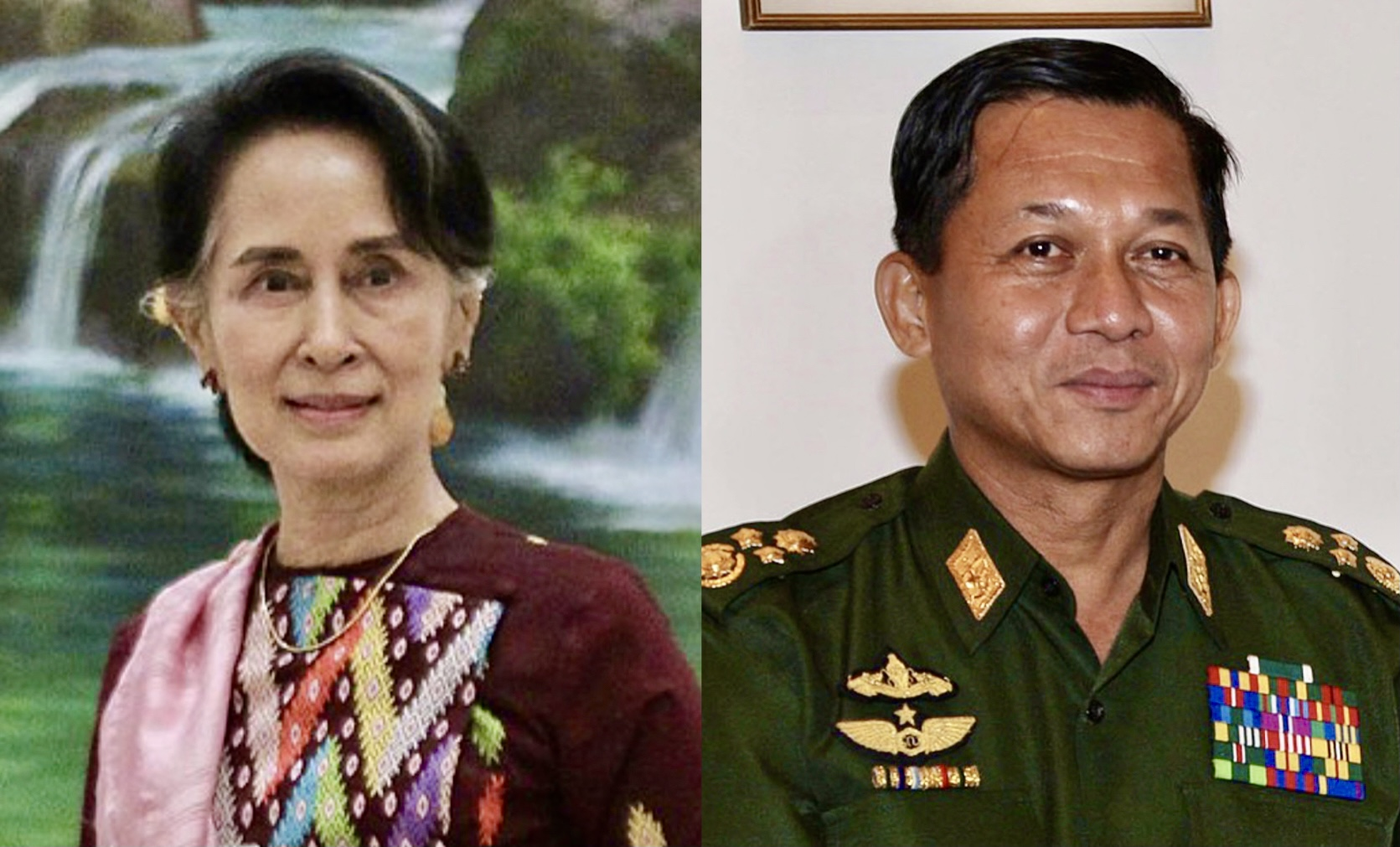
State Counsellor Aung San Suu Kyi (left) was deposed in a military coup led by Senior General Min Aung Hlaing (right) on 1 February 2021.

On the early morning of 1 February 2021, the civilian government led by the NLD was overthrown in a military coup d'état, and the Tatmadaw's commander-in-chief, Senior General Min Aung Hlaing, became the head of state. Aung San Suu Kyi and several other senior members of her government were arrested by the military during the coup. Mass protests followed, with demonstrators demanding the resignation of Min Aung Hlaing and the newly created State Administration Council (SAC), the release of those arrested in the coup, and the restoration of the civilian government.

Anti-coup protesters have armed themselves with slingshots, molotov cocktails, and makeshift shields. In late March 2021, it was reported that dozens of protesters had travelled to Myanmar's border areas to train under one of the country's many insurgent groups, elevating the risk of a countrywide civil war. The civilian government-in-exile, the Committee Representing the Pyidaungsu Hluttaw (CRPH), has proposed the formation of a "federal armed force" to combat the military.

One of the first instances of armed resistance by protesters occurred in and around the town of Kalay, Sagaing Region. After the Tatmadaw raided a protest camp in Kalay on 28 March 2021, protesters fought back with hunting rifles and homemade firearms. Several insurgent groups, notably the Kachin Independence Army and the Karen National Liberation Army, have also resumed or escalated their attacks against the Tatmadaw in response to the coup.

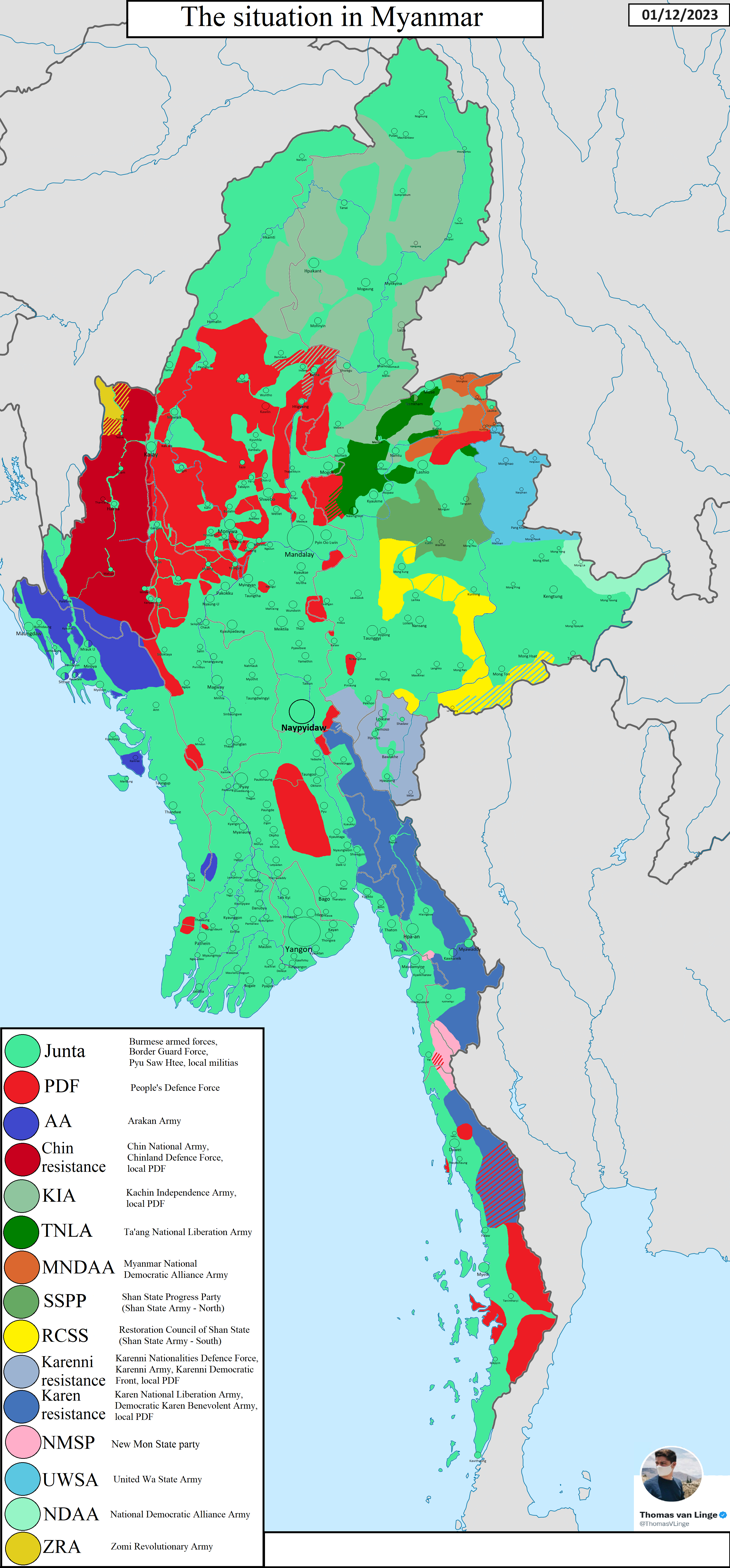
Map of insurgent activity in Myanmar in December 2023

Seven signatories of the Nationwide Ceasefire Agreement announced on 4 April 2021 that they had decided to join the National Unity Government, including the All Burma Student Democratic Front and the Karen National Union. Some of the groups have resumed hostilities towards the junta government.

The Chinland Defence Force began its armed resistance in Mindat and Hakha, Chin State, on 26 April 2021.

On 5 May 2021, the National Unity Government declared the formation of an armed wing, the People's Defence Force (PDF), to protect its supporters from military junta attacks and as a first step towards a Federal Union Army. It clashed with the Tatmadaw in the town of Muse on 23 May, killing at least 13 members of Myanmar's security forces. Members of the Karenni People's Defence Force (KPDF) in Kayah State also clashed with the Tatmadaw near the state capital of Loikaw.

The Communist Party of Burma rearmed itself and announced the creation of its new armed wing, the People's Liberation Army, in late 2021.

ACLED estimated that 11,000 people had been killed from February to December 2021.

== Conflict by state or region ==
=== Chin State and Sagaing Region ===
The Mizo people of Mizoram, India, the Chin people of Myanmar, and the Kuki people are all Zo people who share a common culture and history.

In 1960, the Chin Liberation Army was founded by Tun Kho Pum Baite to unify the Chin-inhabited areas, while the Mizo National Front (MNF) fought for Mizo independence. The Chin National Army (CNF) was formed in 1988. It signed a ceasefire agreement with the Chin State government in 2012. The Kuki National Army (KNA) was also founded in 1988, aiming for Kuki autonomy in Myanmar and India.

Several separatist groups fighting the Indian government in Northeast India also operate from bases in Myanmar, such as the Zomi Revolutionary Army, the United Liberation Front of Assam (ULFA), and the National Socialist Council of Nagaland (NSCN). These groups frequently cross into India via the porous border.

In June 2019, Tatmadaw troops, in coordination with the Indian Army, carried out operations against the NSCN headquarters in Taga, in the Naga Self-Administered Zone of Sagaing Region.

=== Kachin State ===
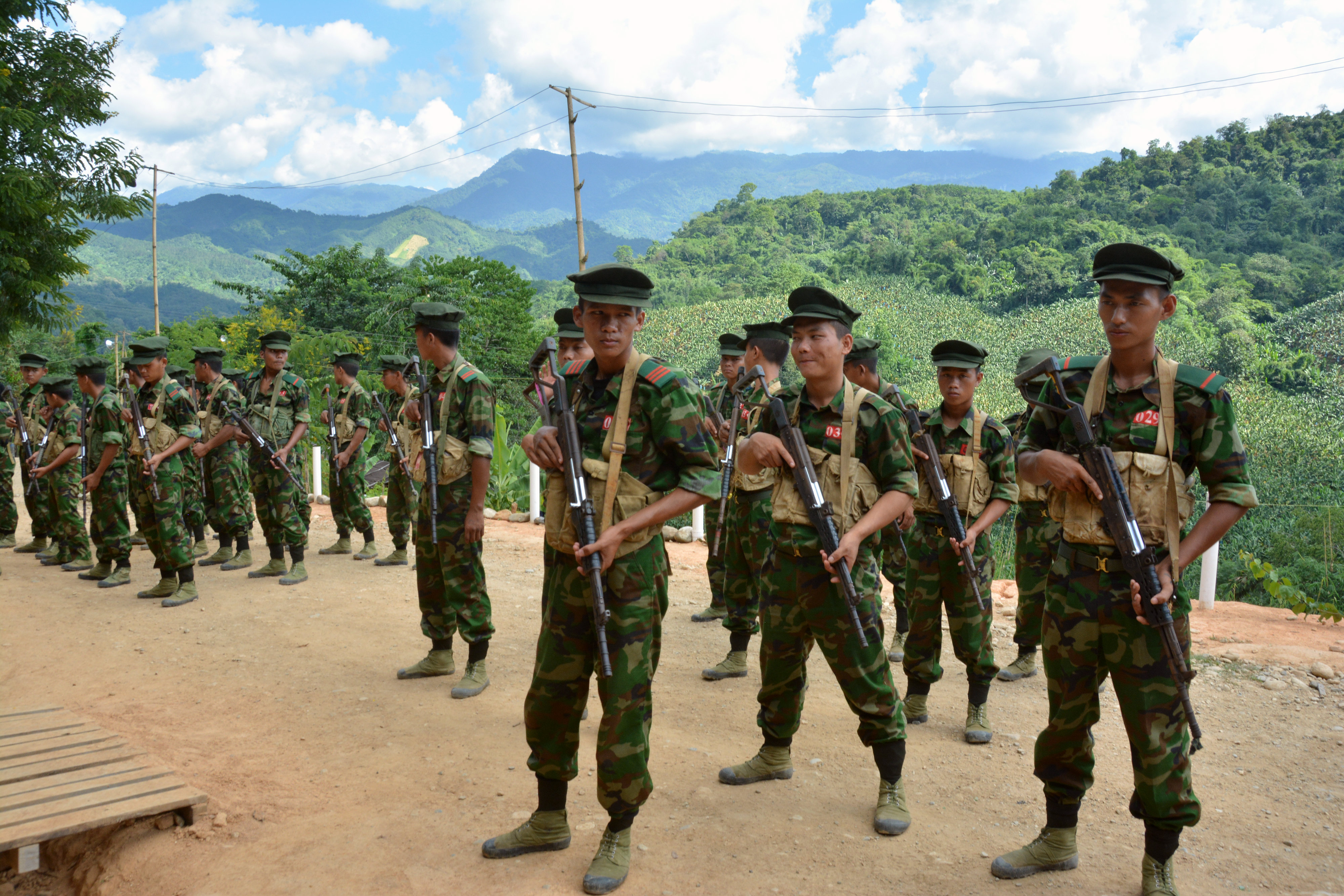
Cadets of the Kachin Independence Army (KIA) preparing for military drills at the group's headquarters in Laiza

The Kachin people are a major ethnic minority in Myanmar who primarily inhabit the mountainous northern regions of the Kachin Hills in Kachin State. Kachin regular soldiers previously formed a significant part of the Myanmar Army; however, after Ne Win's regime seized power in 1962, many Kachin soldiers defected from the military and reorganised with already active Kachin insurgents to form the Kachin Independence Army (KIA), under the Kachin Independence Organisation (KIO). Religious tensions have also been a source of conflict, as Kachin people have historically been predominantly Christian, while the majority Bamar people have been predominantly Buddhist.

Ceasefire agreements have been signed between the KIA and the government several times; most notably, a ceasefire signed in 1994, that lasted for 17 years until June 2011, when government forces attacked KIA positions along the Taping River, east of Bhamo, Kachin State. As a result of the ceasefire breakdown, Kachin State has faced waves of internal displacement, with over 90,000 internally displaced people spread across over 150 camps or camp-like settings as of April 2017. Many IDP camps are located in non-government-controlled areas with severely restricted access. The Internal Displacement Monitoring Centre (IDMC) estimates that in April and May 2018, over 14,000 people were displaced from fighting between the KIA and the Tatmadaw.

Clashes between the KIA and the Tatmadaw in 2012 resulted in around 2,500 casualties (both civilian and military), 211 of whom were government soldiers. The violence resulted in the displacement of nearly 100,000 civilians and the complete or partial abandonment of 364 villages.

Government forces attacked the Kachin Independence Army's headquarters near the city of Laiza on 19 November 2014, killing at least 22 KIA insurgents, according to the government.

N'Ban La became the KIO's chairman and the KIA's second-in-command in January 2018. Htang Gam Shawng retained his position as the KIA's commander-in-chief.

=== Kayah State ===
In 1957, pro-independence groups in Karenni State (present-day Kayah State) founded the Karenni National Progressive Party (KNPP). An accompanying armed wing, the Karenni Army, was established shortly after to fight for the self-determination of the Karenni people. The Karenni Army and Tatmadaw have fought in the region ever since, apart from a brief three-month ceasefire in 1995. Rivals to the KNPP include the leftist Kayan New Land Party (KNLP) and Karenni National People's Liberation Front (KNPLF), both of whom signed ceasefires with the government in the 1990s.

The Karenni Army is currently led by General Bee Htoo, and consists of roughly between 500 and 1,500 troops.

The conflict escalated following the 2021 military coup, with the civilian-led Karenni People's Defence Force (KPDF) opening up a new front in northern Kayah State. After Tatmadaw troops attacked and burned down several villages in the region, KPDF fighters launched an offensive against the Tatmadaw, seizing and destroying several military outposts.

=== Kayin State ===
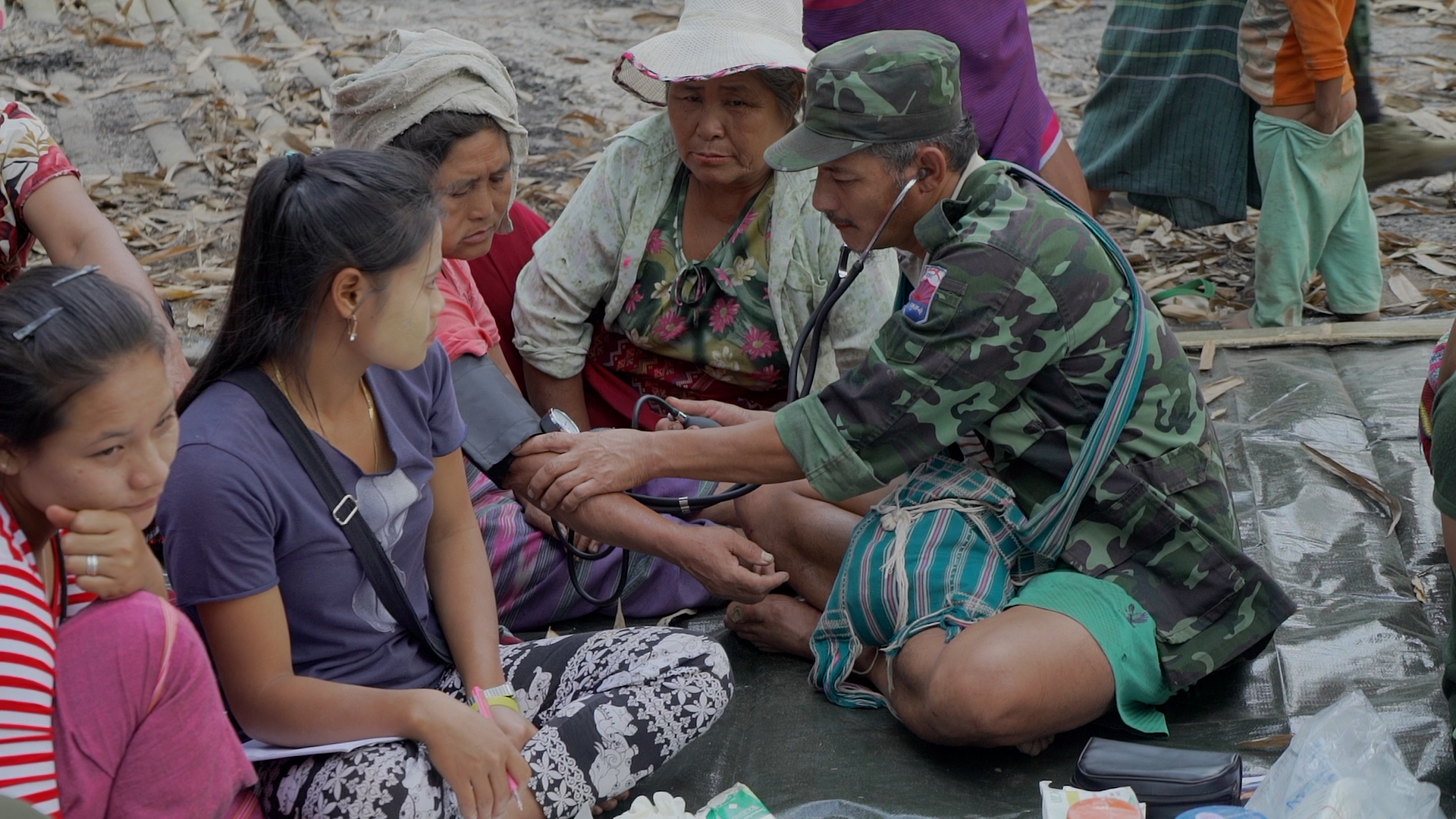
A KNLA medic treats IDPs in Hpapun District, Kayin State.

The Karen people of Kayin State (formerly Karen State) in eastern Myanmar are the third largest ethnic group in Myanmar, consisting of roughly 7% of the country's total population. Karen insurgent groups have fought for independence and self-determination since 1949. In 1949, the commander-in-chief of the Tatmadaw General Smith Dun, an ethnic Karen, was fired because of the rise of Karen opposition groups, which furthered ethnic tensions. He was replaced by Ne Win, a Bamar nationalist who would later rule Myanmar as a military dictator.

The government of Myanmar has been accused of using "scorched earth" tactics against Karen civilians in the past, including (but not limited to) burning down entire villages, planting land mines, using civilians as slave labour, using civilians as minesweepers and the rape and murder of Karen women. According to a report by legal firm DLA Piper, whose report was presented to the United Nations Security Council, these tactics against the Karen can be identified as ethnic cleansing. The government had, however, denied these claims.

The initial aim of the Karen National Union (KNU) and its armed wing the Karen National Liberation Army (KNLA) was to create independent state for the Karen people. However, since 1976 they have instead called for a federal union with fair Karen representation and the self-determination of the Karen people.

In 1995, the main headquarters and operating bases of the KNU were mostly destroyed or captured by the government, forcing the KNLA to operate from the jungles of Kayin State. Until 1995, the Thai government supported insurgents across the Myanmar–Thailand border, but soon stopped its support due to a new major economic deal with Myanmar.

The KNU signed the Nationwide Ceasefire Agreement with the government of Myanmar on 15 October 2015, along with seven other insurgent groups. However, in March 2018, the government of Myanmar violated the agreement by sending 400 Tatmadaw soldiers into KNU-held territory to build a road connecting two military bases. Armed clashes erupted between the KNU and the Myanmar Army in the Ler Mu Plaw area of Hpapun District, resulting in the displacement of 2,000 people. On 17 May 2018, the Tatmadaw agreed to "temporarily postpone" their road project and to withdraw troops from the area.

The KNU resumed its fight against the Myanmar government following the 2021 military coup. On 27 April 2021, KNU insurgents captured a military base on the west bank of the Salween River, which forms Myanmar's border with Thailand. The Tatmadaw later retaliated with airstrikes on KNU positions. There were no casualties reported by either side.

=== Mon State ===
The Mon people have sought self-determination since Myanmar gained independence in 1948, initially under the Mon People's Front and from 1962 through the New Mon State Party (NMSP). The Mon National Liberation Army (MNLA) has been fighting government forces since 1949. It signed the Nationwide Ceasefire Agreement in 2015 and has had minor skirmishes with the Karen National Liberation Army (KNLA).

=== Rakhine State ===
==== Rakhine insurgency ====
Insurgent groups of the Rakhine (or Arakanese), Chin, and Rohingya ethnic minorities have fought against the government for self-determination in Rakhine State since the early 1950s. The region was a stronghold of the Red Flag Communist Party until its defeat by the Tatmadaw in 1978. Its successor, the Communist Party of Arakan continued to wage an insurgency in Rakhine State until the 1990s.

Ethnic Rakhine insurgent groups, such as the Arakan Army and Arakan Liberation Army (ALA), continue to fight against the government, though major violence has been rare since political reforms and peace talks. The Arakan Army, founded in 2009, is currently the largest insurgent group in Rakhine State, with around 7,000 fighters.

On 4 January 2019, around 300 Arakan Army insurgents launched pre-dawn attacks on four border police outposts—Kyaung Taung, Nga Myin Taw, Ka Htee La and Kone Myint—in northern Buthidaung Township. Thirteen members of the Border Guard Police (BGP) were killed and nine others were injured, while 40 firearms and more than 10,000 rounds of ammunition were looted. The Arakan Army later stated that it had captured nine BGP personnel and five civilians, and that three of its fighters were also killed in the attacks.

Following the attacks, the Office of the President of Myanmar held a high-level meeting on national security in the capital Naypyidaw on 7 January 2019, and instructed the Defence Ministry to increase troop deployments in the areas that were attacked and to use aircraft if necessary. Subsequent clashes between the Myanmar Army and the Arakan Army were reported in Maungdaw, Buthidaung, Kyauktaw, Rathedaung and Ponnagyun Townships, forcing out over 5,000 civilians from their homes, hundreds of whom (mostly Rakhine and Khami) have fled across the border into Bangladesh. Civilian casualties, arbitrary beatings and detentions of ethnic Rakhines, forced seizures of property, and blockage of food aid and medical relief by the Tatmadaw have also been reported.

==== Rohingya insurgency ====
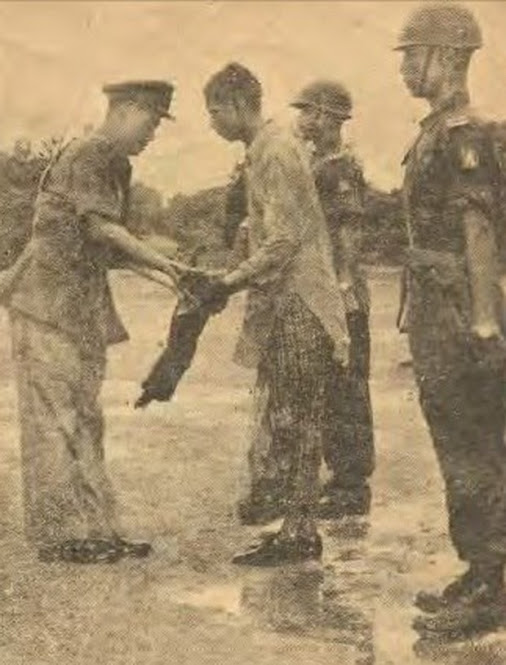
A Rohingya mujahid surrenders his weapon to Brigadier-General Aung Gyi, 4 July 1961.

Rohingya insurgents have been fighting against local government forces and other insurgent groups in northern Rakhine State since 1948, with ongoing religious violence between the predominantly Muslim Rohingyas and the Buddhist Rakhines fuelling the conflict.

Following the independence of Myanmar, Rohingya mujahideen fought against government forces in an attempt to secede and annex Rohingya-inhabited regions to East Pakistan. Between 1949 and 1954, the Burmese military launched several operations in order to regain control of the region. By the end of the 1950s, the mujahideen had lost most of their momentum and support, and most of their fighters had surrendered by 1961.

Ne Win's military junta turned increasingly hostile towards the Rohingyas. The authorities launched large-scale military operations in order to expel insurgents and so-called "foreigners" from Arakan, such as Operation Dragon King in 1978 and Operation Pyi Thaya in 1991

The legal and political rights of the Rohingya people have been an underlying issue during the conflict, with spontaneous bouts of violence, such as the 2012 Rakhine State riots and the 2013 Myanmar anti-Muslim riots, periodically occurring as a result. Despite making up the majority of the population in the three northern townships of Rakhine State, the Rohingyas are frequently the targets of religiously motivated attacks. The 1982 Nationality law did not recognise the Rohingyas as an ethnic group which is native to Myanmar. As a result, the Rohingyas cannot apply for Burmese citizenship and few laws exist to protect their rights.

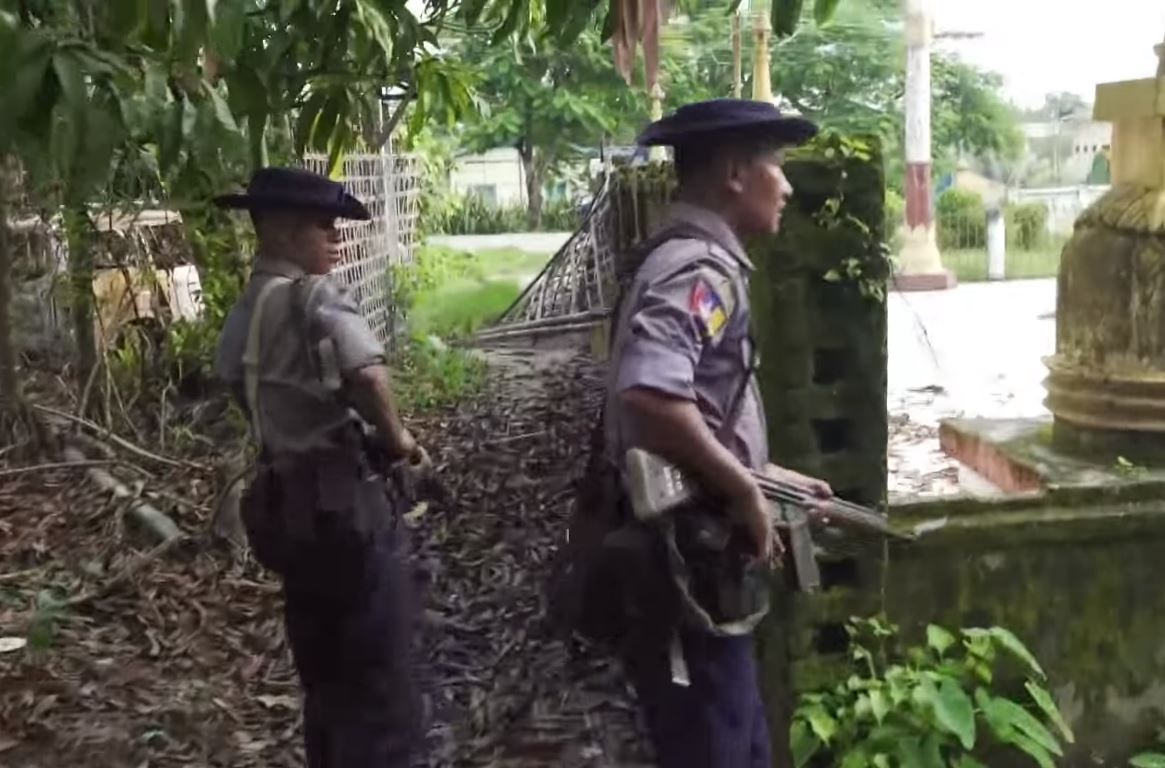
Members of the Myanmar Police Force patrolling in Maungdaw in September 2017.

On 9 October 2016, unidentified insurgents attacked three Burmese border posts along Myanmar's border with Bangladesh, starting a new armed conflict in northern Rakhine State. According to government officials in the border town of Maungdaw, the attackers looted several dozen firearms and ammunition from the border posts, and they also brandished knives and homemade slingshots that fired metal bolts. The attacks left nine border officers and "several insurgents" dead. On 11 October 2016, four Tatmadaw soldiers were killed on the third day of fighting. A newly emerging insurgent group, the Arakan Rohingya Salvation Army (ARSA), claimed responsibility for the attacks a week later.

During the early hours of 25 August 2017, ARSA insurgents launched coordinated attacks on 24 police posts and the 552nd Light Infantry Battalion army base, killing a dozen people. In response, the Tatmadaw launched "clearance operations" in northern Rakhine State, which critics argued targeted Rohingya civilians rather than insurgents. Following the violence, 200,000 civilians remained trapped in the region without adequate access to markets, livelihoods, services and medical care.

=== Shan State ===
The Shan people are the largest ethnic group in Shan State and the second largest in Myanmar. They were one of several ethnic groups consulted by Aung San during negotiations leading up to the Panglong Agreement, which gave the Shan leaders the option to split from Myanmar a decade after independence if they were unsatisfied with the central government. This was, however, not honoured by the post-independence government following Aung San's assassination.

Frustrated by a decade of fruitless negotiations, a group of 39 Shan led by Saw Yanda (a Shan from Yunnan, China; also known as Chao Noi, Sao Noi, and Saw Yanna) formed an armed resistance movement on 21 May 1958. It became known as the Noom Suk Harn (or Noom Seik Harn), meaning "brave young warriors". In 1960, the movement suffered an internal split between the "rough and uneducated" Saw Yanda and a group of young intellectuals, and the latter subsequently formed the Shan State Independence Army (SSIA). Aside from the remnants of the Noom Suk Harn and the SSIA, there was also the Shan National United Front (SNUF), which operated primarily in southern Shan State. The SSIA, the SNUF, and the Kokang Force (a local army consisting of Kokang Chinese) agreed to merge into the Shan State Army (SSA) in 1964. Sao Nang Hearn Kham, the Mahadevi (queen consort) of Yawnghwe, was elected chairperson of its political wing, the Shan State War Council (SSWC). The SSWC was replaced by the Shan State Progress Party (SSPP) on 16 August 1971.

In northern Shan State, the SSA came into conflict with the Communist Party of Burma (CPB), which had long been active along Burma's border with China. During the 1960s, the Burma Army began the Ka Kew Ye (KKY) program, which recruited ethnic armies to combat communist insurgents, and in return, they would be permitted to engage in cross-border trade on their own terms. This led to many units of the SSA defecting to the KKY militias. The SSA also worked with opium warlords such as Lo Hsing Han and Khun Sa. Internal divisions resulted in the SSA fracturing into many factions, and it collapsed in mid-1976. The SSPP later formed the pro-communist Shan State Army – North (SSA-N) to continue the insurgency. After the CPB suffered an internal mutiny and collapsed in April 1989, the SSA-N signed a ceasefire agreement with the government in exchange for autonomy over the areas it controlled (officially called "Special Region 3 of Shan State"). A splinter group led by Sai Leun which broke away from the CPB at the same time established the National Democratic Alliance Army (NDAA), which controls the Mong La area (Special Region 4) of Shan State.

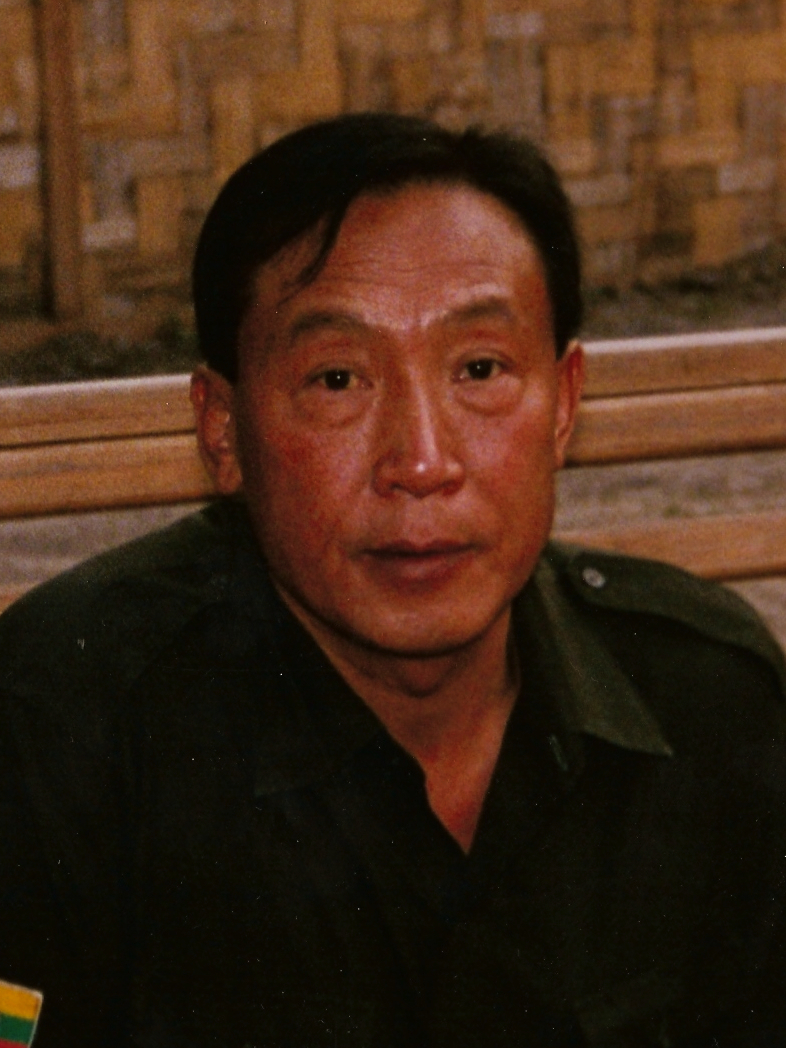
Khun Sa in 1988

In the 1960s, Khun Sa, a KKY militia leader, was permitted by the Burmese government to grow and traffic opium in return for fighting Shan and communists insurgents. He gradually became one of the most powerful insurgent leaders in Shan State. Khun Sa was captured by the Tatmadaw after plotting with the SSA in 1969, but was later released to Thailand, where he built an army near the Burmese border and became the dominant opium warlord in the Golden Triangle. After being expelled by the Thai Army in 1982, Khun Sa returned to Burma and formed the Mong Tai Army (MTA) in 1985. In the 1990s, the MTA became the dominant Shan fighting force with peak strength of 20,000 soldiers. In 1991, Khun Sa declared the creation of an independent Shan State, with himself as president. However, some Shan nationalists in the MTA disagreed with his leadership and formed a rival Shan organisation, the Shan State National Army (SSNA). The Mong Tai Army was quickly disbanded after the mass desertion, and Khun Sa himself surrendered to the government in 1996. He was allowed to retire in Yangon and keep his large fortune.

Refusing to surrender with Khun Sa and the MTA, Lieutenant General Yawd Serk of the Shan United Revolutionary Army (SURA) led 800 soldiers under his command to central Shan State and established the Shan State Army – South (SSA-S) on 26 January 1996. He then recruited roughly a thousand more soldiers before returning to southern Shan State to establish the group's headquarters in Loi Tai Leng. The SSA-S has since become one of the largest Shan insurgent groups in Myanmar, and has around 8,000 soldiers as of 2016. Yawd Serk lead the group until his retirement on 2 February 2014. Its political wing is the Restoration Council of Shan State. The SSA-S maintains a number of bases along the Myanmar–Thailand border, and signed a ceasefire agreement with the government on 2 December 2011.

The Tatmadaw launched a military offensive named Operation Perseverance (ဇွဲမန်ဟိန်း) against insurgents in Shan State in 2011. During the offensive, the Tatmadaw captured territory from the NDAA and the SSA-N, with the latter being involved in most of the fighting. While this operation was officially a response to the groups' rejections of the junta's "One Nation, One Army" policy, researchers have linked it to the military's interests in the jade trade.

In October 2015, the Tatmadaw launched a military offensive to seize territory granted to the SSA-N under a previous ceasefire. The Tatmadaw used heavy artillery and airstrikes, displacing thousands of civilians.

Other ethnic armed groups in the region include the Lahu Democratic Union, the Ta'ang National Liberation Army, the Wa National Army and the Pa-O National Liberation Army, of varying sizes and affiliations.

==== Kokang ====
From the 1960s to 1989, the Kokang area in northern Shan state was controlled by the Communist Party of Burma, and after the party's armed wing disbanded in 1989 it became a special region of Myanmar under the control of the Myanmar Nationalities Democratic Alliance Army (MNDAA). The MNDAA is a Kokang insurgent group active in the Kokang Self-Administered Zone in northern Shan State. The group signed a ceasefire agreement with the government in 1989, the same year it was founded, which lasted for two decades until 2009, when government troops entered MNDAA territory in an attempt to stop the flow of drugs through the area. Violence erupted again in 2015, when the MNDAA attempted to retake territory it had lost in 2009. The MNDAA clashed with government troops once again in 2017.

The MNDAA resumed its fight against the Tatmadaw in response to the 2021 coup d'état. The MNDAA and Ta'ang National Liberation Army (TNLA) have carried out several joint attacks against the Tatmadaw in Shan State.

==== Wa State ====
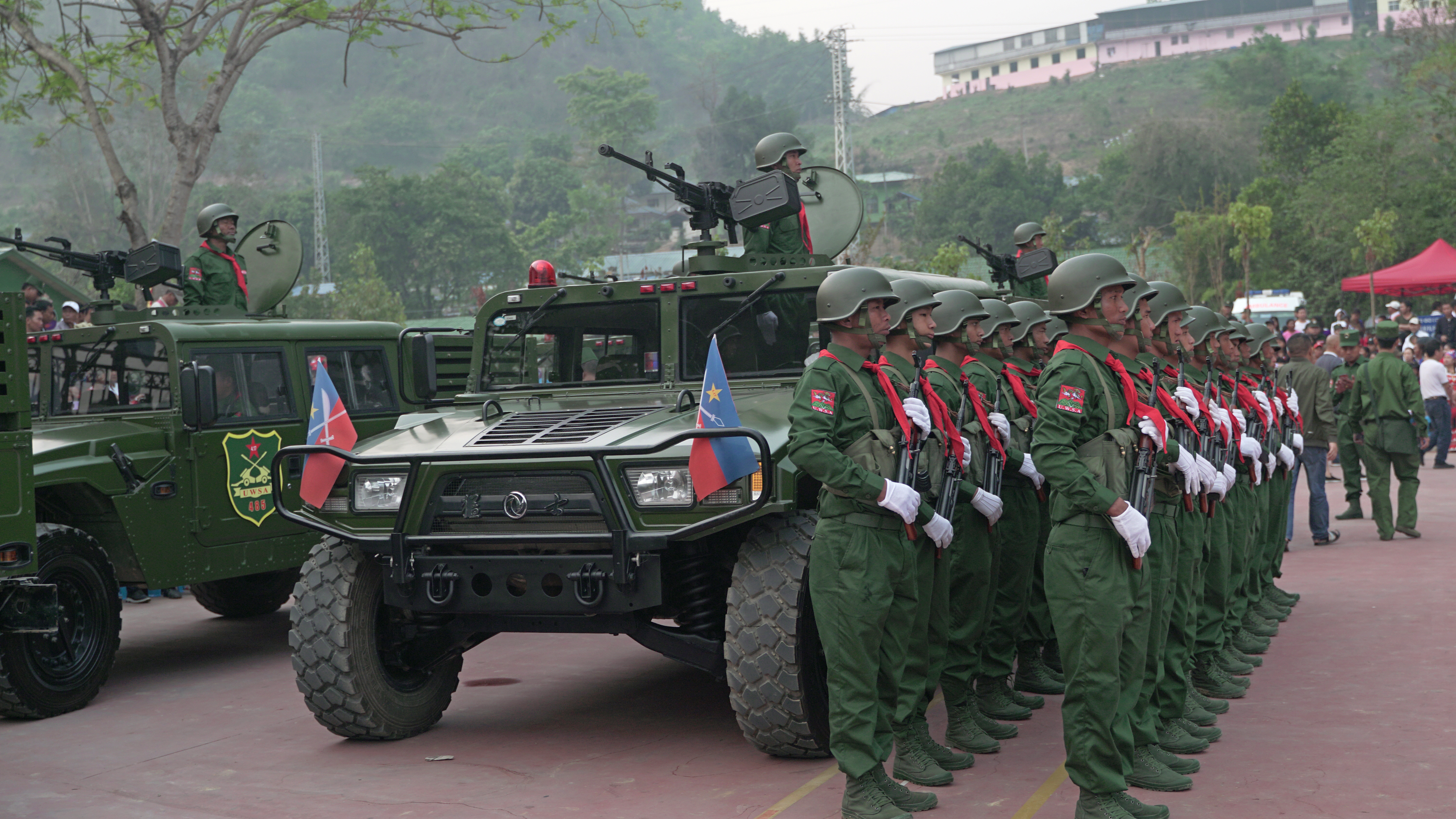
UWSA troops standing at attention during a military ceremony.

Following the CPB's internal mutiny on 16 April 1989, ethnic Wa cadres under the command of Bao Youxiang announced their split from the party and the founding of the United Wa State Party and United Wa State Army. The UWSA signed a ceasefire agreement with the then-ruling military junta in May 1989 and has since governed parts of Shan State as the autonomous Wa State. The Burmese government has accused their Chinese counterpart of heavily supporting Wa State and the UWSA.

== Foreign involvement ==
=== China ===
The People's Republic of China has long been accused of having a multifaceted role in the conflict, given its close relations with both the Myanmar government and insurgent groups active along the China–Myanmar border.

China openly supported the Communist Party of Burma (CPB) and its pursuit of Mao Zedong Thought during the 1960s and 1970s. After the CPB's armed wing agreed to disarm in 1988, China was accused by Myanmar of continuing to support insurgent groups operating along its border, such as the United Wa State Army and Myanmar National Democratic Alliance Army, the latter enjoying closer ties to China due to a common Han Chinese ethnic background.

In 2016, China pledged to support Myanmar's peace process by encouraging China-friendly insurgent groups to attend peace talks with the Burmese government and by sending more soldiers to secure its border with Myanmar. China also offered $3 million USD to fund the negotiations. However, the Burmese government has expressed suspicion over China's involvement in the peace process, due to China's alleged links to the Northern Alliance and the United Wa State Army.

=== India ===
India and Myanmar share a strategic military relationship due to the overlapping insurgency in Northeast India. India has provided Myanmar's military with training, weapons, and tactical equipment. The two countries' armies have conducted joint operations against insurgents at their border since the 1990s. Myanmar has also taken an active role in finding and arresting insurgents that fled from northeast India; in May 2020 Myanmar handed over 22 insurgents, included several top commanders, to Indian authorities. Similarly, India has been one of the few countries to forcefully repatriate Rohingya refugees back to Myanmar despite global outcry.

=== Pakistan ===
From 1948 to 1950, Pakistan sent aid to mujahideen in northern Arakan (present-day Rakhine State). In 1950, the Pakistani government warned their Burmese counterparts about their treatment of Muslims. In response, Burmese Prime Minister U Nu immediately sent a Muslim diplomat, Pe Khin, to negotiate a memorandum of understanding. Pakistan agreed to cease aid to the mujahideen and arrest members of the group. In 1954, mujahid leader Mir Kassem was arrested by Pakistani authorities, and many of his followers later surrendered to the Burmese government.

The International Crisis Group reported on 14 December 2016 that in interviews with the Arakan Rohingya Salvation Army (ARSA), its leaders claimed to have links to private donors in Saudi Arabia and Pakistan. The ICG also released unconfirmed reports that Rohingya villagers had been "secretly trained" by Afghan and Pakistani fighters. In September 2017, Bangladeshi sources stated that the possibility of cooperation between Pakistan's Inter-Services Intelligence (ISI) and ARSA was "extremely high".

=== Russia ===
In November 2013, delegations from the Burmese and Russian armed forces met in Naypyidaw and agreed to strengthen cooperation between the two, particularly in regards to the exchange of military technology. Myanmar and Russia signed a military cooperation agreement in June 2016, with Russia promising more arms and training for Myanmar's military.

=== Thailand ===
Thailand had been a vocal supporter of various insurgent groups in Myanmar, condemning the actions of the then-ruling military juntas and allowing weapons and ammunition to be smuggled through its border. However, in 1995, the Thai government secured its border with Myanmar and stopped all logistical support going through Thailand after they signed a major economic deal with Myanmar.

=== United States ===
The US Central Intelligence Agency (CIA) began aiding Kuomintang soldiers that fled to Myanmar from China following the advance of Chinese communist forces into Yunnan in 1951. This included Operation Paper, which involved supplying them with non-lethal aid via Thailand until 1953, when they airlifted 7,000 soldiers to Taiwan and ended the operation.

=== Yugoslavia ===
Yugoslavia became the primary arms supplier for the Burmese government beginning in 1952, when the Burmese reached out to Belgrade due to the slow and uneasy support from the United States and the United Kingdom. The two nations became very close as a result, and the Yugoslav People's Army sent advisors to assist on the frontlines. The sudden strong relationship between Burma and Yugoslavia prompted concern among the Americans, who worried the Yugoslav support would strengthen Marxist ideology in the government. Ne Win, who previously sought support solely from the West, was impressed with the speed of the Burmese–Yugoslav cooperation, and travelled to Belgrade in 1953.

=== Arms suppliers ===
As of 2019, Myanmar's military is supplied by fourteen arms companies from seven countries: China, India, Israel, North Korea, the Philippines, Russia, and Ukraine.

Despite Serbia signing a non-binding UN resolution calling for the cessation of arms sales to Myanmar following the 2021 Myanmar coup d'état, hundreds of Serbian-made 80 mm rockets were sent from Belgrade to Yangon less than a week after the coup.

Vietnam has also been a vocal supporter of modernisation efforts by Myanmar's military, providing them with ammunition and military hardware. Burmese military officials have also toured Vietnam to receive military advice from their counterparts in the People's Army of Vietnam.

=== Foreign fighters ===
Dave Everett was a member of the Australian Special Air Service Regiment before leaving in 1986 and joining the Karen National Liberation Army as a mercenary. Everett fought alongside the KNLA under the alias "Steve" and trained insurgents, helping them improve their marksmanship and teaching them how to use claymore anti-personnel mines. To fund his time with the KNLA, Everett perpetrated several robberies in Australia with the help of accomplices and took piloting lessons so he could smuggle weapons into Myanmar. Everett returned to Australia a year later in 1987.

Former members of the British special forces, Australian special forces, Green berets, French Foreign Legion, and Russian Spetsnaz have also been reported fighting alongside insurgents as recently as 2012.

== Ceasefire attempts ==
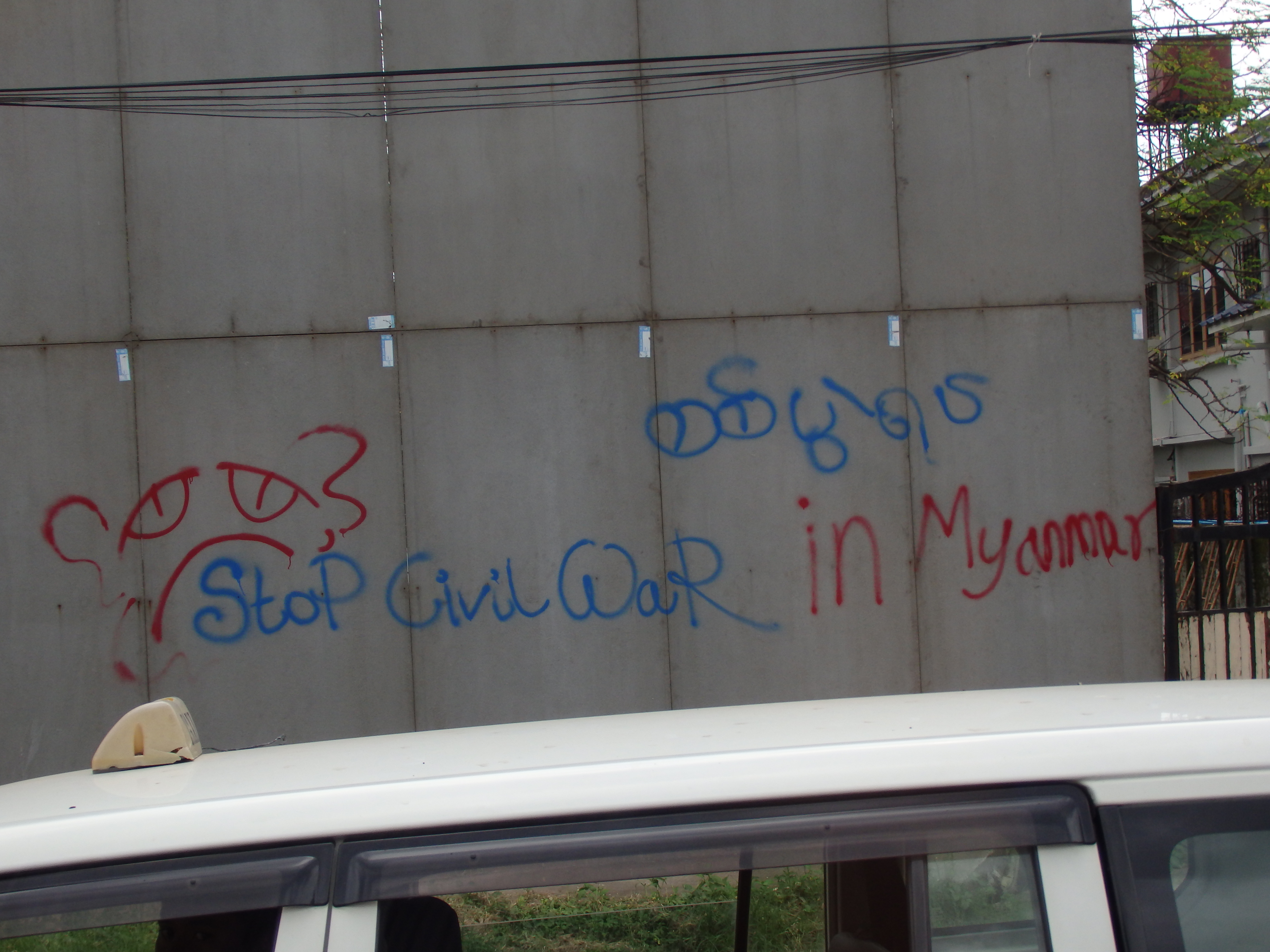
"Stop Civil War in Myanmar" – graffiti on a wall in Yangon, 2014

A number of insurgent groups have negotiated ceasefires and peace agreements with successive governments, but most have since fallen apart.

Under the new constitutional reforms in 2011, state level and union level ceasefire agreements were made with a number of insurgent groups. Fourteen of the 17 largest rebel factions signed a ceasefire agreement with the new reformed government. All of the 14 signatories wanted negotiations in accordance with the Panglong Agreement of 1947, which granted self-determination, a federal system of government (meaning regional autonomy), religious freedom and ethnic minority rights. However, the new constitution, only had a few clauses dedicated to minority rights, and therefore, the government discussed with rebel factions using the new constitution for reference, rather than the Panglong Agreement. There was no inclusive plan or body that represented all the factions, and as a result, in resent, the KNU backed out of the conference and complained the lack of independence for each party within the ethnic bloc. However, most of the negotiations between the State Peace Deal Commission and rebel factions were formal and peaceful.

On 31 March 2015, a draft of the Nationwide Ceasefire Agreement (NCA) was finalised between representatives from eight insurgent groups (all part of the Nationwide Ceasefire Coordination Team or NCCT) and the government of Myanmar. However, only eight of the 15 insurgent groups signed the final agreement on 15 October 2015. The signing was witnessed by observers and delegates from the United Nations, the United Kingdom, Norway, Japan and the United States. Two other insurgent groups later joined the agreement on 13 February 2018.

The Union Peace Conference – 21st Century Panglong was held from 31 August to 4 September 2016 with several different organisations as representatives, in an attempt to mediate between the government and different insurgent groups. Talks ended without any agreement being reached. The name of the conference was a reference to the original Panglong Conference held during British rule in 1947, which was negotiated between Aung San and ethnic leaders.

== Casualties and displacement of civilians ==
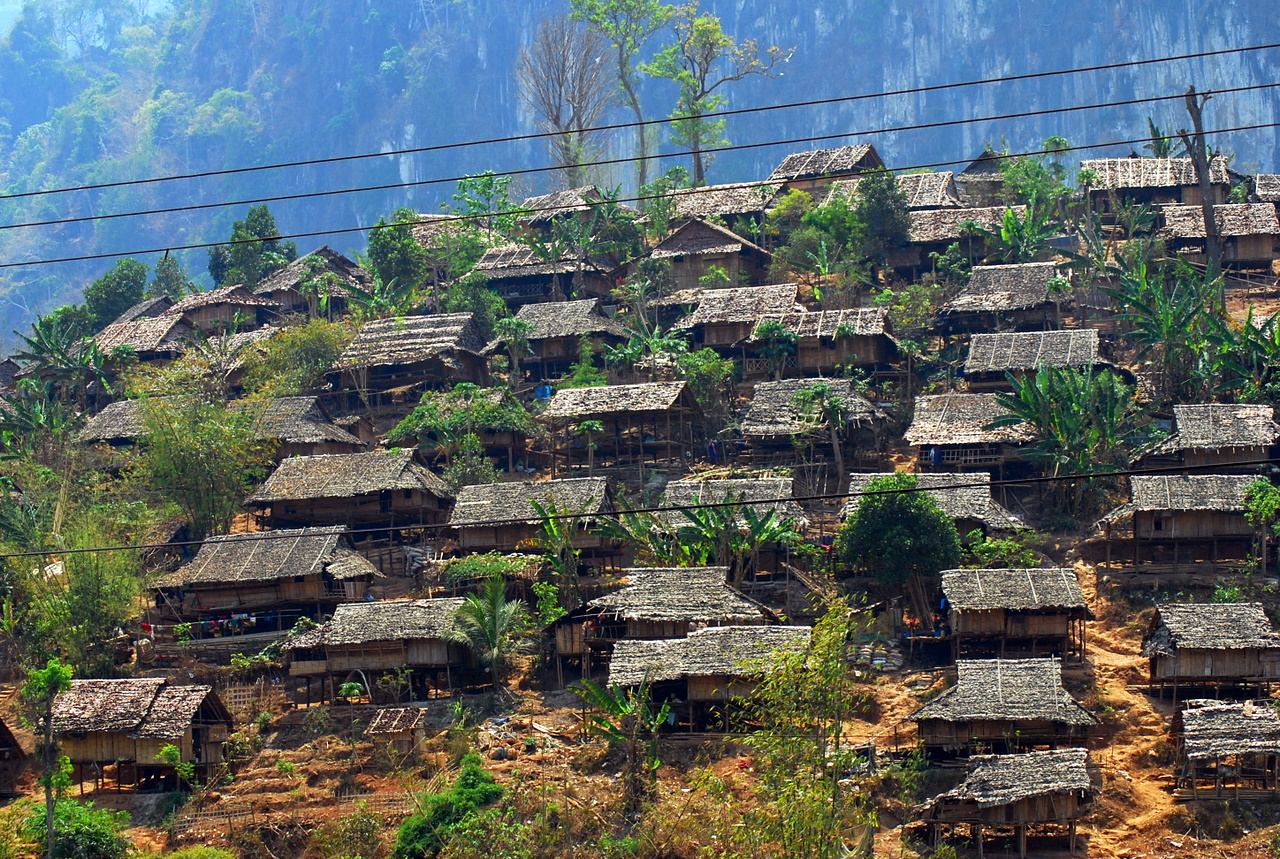
Mae La Camp in Tak, Thailand, one of the largest of nine UNHCR camps in Thailand where over 700,000 refugees, asylum seekers and stateless persons have fled.

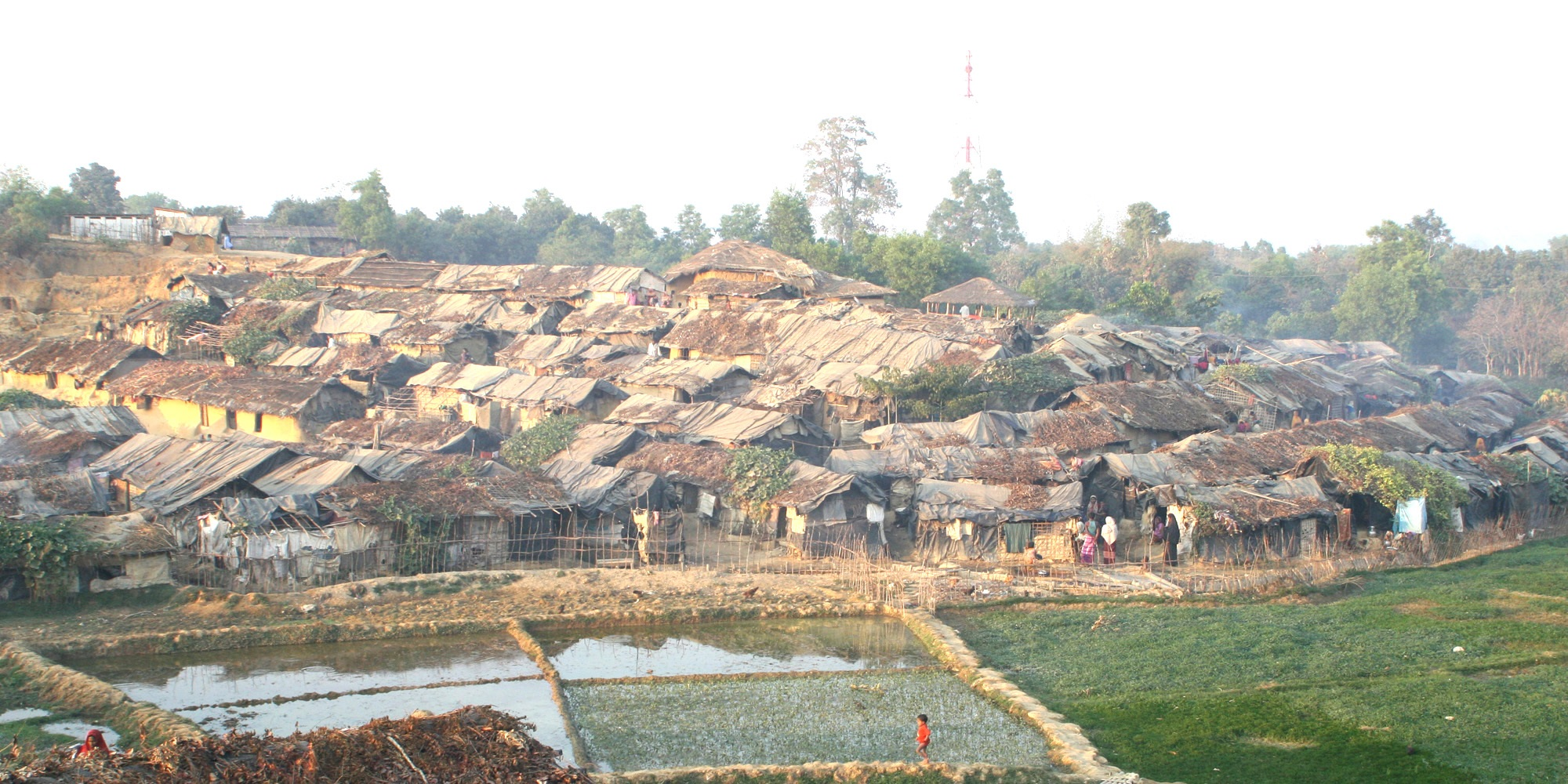
Kutupalong refugee camp in Bangladesh, home to nearly 550,000 Rohingya refugees living in makeshift shelters.

An estimated 130,000 people died in the conflict from 1948 to 2011. The Armed Conflict Location and Event Data Project (ACLED) has recorded over 53,000 deaths since 2011.

The conflict has also resulted in the displacement of a large number of civilians, many of whom have fled to neighbouring countries such as Thailand, China, India, and Bangladesh. The persecution of Rohingya people and other ethnic minorities after the 1962 coup led to the expulsion of nearly 300,000 people. The UN estimated that between 1996 and 2006, around 1 million people were internally displaced inside Myanmar, over 230,000 of whom remain displaced in the southeast of the country, and 128,000 refugees lived in temporary shelters on the Myanmar–Thailand border. In August 2007, approximately 160,000 refugees fled to nine refugee camps along the Myanmar–Thailand border and the Thai border provinces of Chiang Mai and Ratchaburi. Approximately 62% of the refugee population consisted of displaced Karen people. Humanitarian organisations such as Doctors Without Borders have since sent workers and medical support to the refugees. As of 2014, an estimated 600,000 to 1 million people remain internally displaced in Myanmar.

Over the course of the conflict, government officials in Myanmar have been accused of forcefully removing civilians living in conflict areas and confiscating their property, to repurpose them for commercial, industrial, and military projects.

In Rakhine State, there were around 75,000 internally displaced Rohingyas in 2012, according to Refugee International. UNICEF has reported that living conditions in Rohingya refugee camps in Rakhine State are "wholly inadequate" and lacks access to basic services. In October 2017, there were an estimated 947,000 Rohingya refugees in Bangladesh. The Rohingya people have been described by the United Nations as "among the world's least wanted" and "one of the world's most persecuted minorities."

The Internal Displacement Monitoring Centre reports a total of 401,000 people internally displaced in Myanmar as of 2018, owing both to man-made and natural disasters as well as conflict and violence. This figure includes IDPs across the country, with 131,000 in Rakhine State, 97,000 in Kachin State, 50,000 in Kayin State, 40,000 in Tanintharyi Region, 27,000 in Karenni State, 22,000 in Bago Region, 18,000 in Mon State, 15,000 in Shan State and 1,300 in Chin State. Of these total displacements, IDMC estimates that approximately 42,000 people were newly displaced in 2018 by conflict and violence. Compared to 2017, the rate of new displacements was lower in Rakhine State but higher in Kachin State and northern Shan State, which together saw approximately 36,000 people displaced.

The Global Camp Coordination and Camp Management Cluster (CCCM) estimated in 2019 that at least 941,000 people in Myanmar were in need of humanitarian assistance, with over 128,000 people living in IDP camps in Rakhine State and over 105,000 people displaced in Kachin State and northern Shan State. While many displacements last only for the duration of active fighting, protracted displacement is evidenced by camps in Kachin State, Rakhine State, and Shan State. Living situations in these camps are often overcrowded with inadequate shelter, sanitation, healthcare, food, and education. In total, approximately 35 per cent of IDPs in Myanmar are estimated to live in non-government controlled areas that have limited if not wholly restricted access as of November 2019, complicating relief efforts both for international and local organisations.

== Human rights violations ==
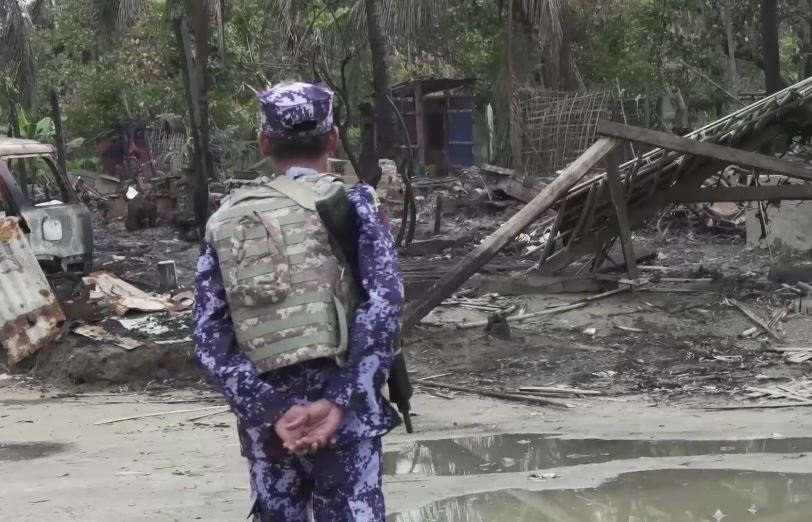
A member of Myanmar's Border Guard Police inspects a house burnt down in an arson attack.

The Tatmadaw have been accused of using "scorched earth" tactics against civilians. The accusations include burning down entire villages, planting landmines, using civilians as slave labour, using civilians as minesweepers, and using civilians as sex slaves. According to a report by legal firm DLA Piper, whose report was presented to the United Nations Security Council, these tactics have been identified as ethnic cleansing.

Both sides have been accused of using landmines, which have caused hundreds of accidental civilian injuries and deaths. The KNU has been accused of planting landmines in rural areas, most of which have not been disarmed. The KNU claims that landmines are vital for repelling government troops because they "discourage [the Tatmadaw] from attacking civilians". However, the majority of those who fall victim to landmines planted by the KNU are local civilians and not government soldiers. Victims of landmines must travel to the Myanmar–Thailand border to seek treatment, as local hospitals and facilities lack proper equipment and funding.

Both sides have also been accused of using thousands of child soldiers, despite the fact that the government of Myanmar and seven insurgent groups signed an agreement with UNICEF in 2012, promising not to exploit children for military and political gains. The International Labour Organization (ILO) has accused both sides of continuing to use child soldiers in violation of the agreement. According to the ILO, the Tatmadaw has discharged hundreds of child soldiers since 2012; however, the ILO also estimated that at least 340 child soldiers had been recruited by the Tatmadaw between 2013 and 2014. Meanwhile, insurgent groups such as the MNDAA, SSA-S, and TNLA have reportedly press-ganged minors into their armies.

One of the most notable cases in which child soldiers were used in Myanmar was that of twins Johnny and Luther Htoo, the leaders of God's Army, a former rebel faction. When God's Army was formed in 1997, the pair were just ten-years-old.

On 25 July 2022, the Human Rights Watch reported that Myanmar's military junta sentenced four men to death after closed trials that fell far short of international standards. The men put to death were Phyo Zeya Thaw, Kyaw Min Yu, Hla Myo Aung and Aung Thura Zaw. These executions followed grossly unjust and politically motivated military trials.

== Organised crime ==
As the conflict has dragged on, transnational criminal groups have continued to operate and expand in Myanmar. In the months following the February 2021 coup, the United Nations Office on Drugs and Crime’s representative for Southeast Asia and the Pacific noted that "the opium economy is really a poverty economy", and raised concerns that the likely economic impacts of the coup would lead people in poor and poverty-stricken areas to look to the opium economy to make money: "Probably 12 months out, 18 months out, we’re going to be looking at an expansion unless past history is wrong. There’s a cycle of this happening in the country over its history".

According to UNODC's Myanmar Opium Survey 2024, the area under opium poppy cultivation in Myanmar expanded each year from 2020 to 2022. There was a 4% decrease in area under cultivation in 2023, but according to UNODC, the reasons for this decline are varied and may relate to broader dynamics of the regional opiate economy as well as the ongoing armed conflict, and it remains unclear if this represents a new chapter in illicit cultivation. Despite the modest drop in the area of cultivation, according to UNODC: "The amount of opium produced in Myanmar remains close to the highest levels we have seen since we first measured it more than 20 years ago … As conflict dynamics in the country remain intense and the global supply chains adjust to the ban in Afghanistan, we see significant risk of a further expansion over the coming years."

After the coup, sites housing illegal online gambling and cyber-enabled fraud operations expanded. This included the Yatai New City complex in Shwe Kokko, which had been frozen and placed under investigation by the NLD government, but restarted and expanded significantly following the coup. In other areas, including many controlled by armed groups allied with the junta, cybercrime sites proliferated.

== International responses ==
Since 1991, the UN General Assembly has adopted twenty-five different resolutions regarding Myanmar's government, condemning previous military juntas for their systematic violations of human rights and lack of political freedom. In 2009 they urged the then ruling junta to take urgent measures to end violations of international human rights and humanitarian laws in the country.

Reports of human rights abuses committed by the military and local paramilitaries prompted the UN Human Rights Council to launch an independent international fact-finding mission in March 2017, with which Myanmar's government failed to cooperate. The mission's report (A/HRC/39/64) released in September 2018 highlighted "clear patterns" of serious human rights abuses and violations of international humanitarian law in Kachin State, Rakhine State, and Shan State since 2011. The Tatmadaw are accused of deliberate and systematic targeting of civilians, sexual violence, discriminatory rhetoric against minorities, and impunity for its soldiers.

Eyewitness testimony alleged that in Rakhine State, "clearance operations" by the Tatmadaw amounted to planned and deliberate mass killings in at least 54 locations. Hundreds and perhaps thousands of Rohingya women and girls were reported to have been raped, including in mass gang rapes, and at least 392 Rohingya villages were burned to the ground. The report also highlighted the conviction of Wa Lone and Kyaw Soe Oo, two Reuters reporters who had exposed the military's extrajudicial killing of ten Rohingya men and were subsequently imprisoned; the journalists have since been released and awarded a 2019 Pulitzer Prize for their reporting.

In addition to violence against Rohingya communities, the report noted Tatamadaw abuses against ethnic Rakhine, including forced labour, sexual violence, forced evictions, and killings. It also highlighted crimes committed by insurgent groups in Kachin State, Rakhine State, and Shan State, including arson, extortion, destruction of property, forced labour, rape, murder, and forced disappearances. The mission called for an investigation into and the prosecution of military leaders, in particular commander-in-chief Senior General Min Aung Hlaing, in the International Criminal Court (ICC) for genocide, crimes against humanity, and war crimes.

The Gambia filed a lawsuit against Myanmar in the International Court of Justice on 11 November 2019. Myanmar State Counsellor Aung San Suu Kyi defended her country's military generals against accusations of genocide in public hearings in December 2019.

== See also ==
- Freedom of religion in Myanmar
- History of Myanmar
- Human rights in Myanmar
- List of ethnic groups in Myanmar
- Opium production in Myanmar
- Persecution of Muslims in Myanmar
- Politics of Myanmar
- Religion in Myanmar
