= Shan State National Army =

Insurgent group in Myanmar

- ရှမ်းပြည် အမျိုးသား တပ်မတော်
- Flag of the Shan State National Army
- Leader: Colonel Kan Yod
- Dates active: 1995-present
- Country: Myanmar
- Headquarters: Hsipaw, Myanmar
- Active regions: Shan State, Myanmar
- Ideology: Shan nationalism federalism democracy socialism communism
- Size: 8,000
- Wars: the Internal conflict in Myanmar

The Shan State National Army (Burmese: ရှမ်းပြည် အမျိုးသား တပ်မတော်; abbreviated SSNA) is a Shan nationalist neutral faction formed by Colonel Kan Yod to cooperate with the Burmese government.

== History ==
The Shan State National Army was formed on 7 July 1995 by disgruntled members of Khun Sa's Mong Tai Army (MTA). The group claimed the MTA was too focused on trafficking narcotics from China into Myanmar, rather than focusing on the self-determination of the Shan people. The two leaders and 500 other troops decided split from the MTA.

By September 1995, around 2,000 more insurgents had joined the SSNA, leaving the MTA headquarters at Ha Mong and establishing a base in the town of Hsipaw. The Mong Tai Army eventually surrendered to government forces and disbanded after the mass desertion. The SSNA signed a ceasefire with the government at the end of 1995.

== See also ==
- Internal conflict in Burma
- Shan people
