= Homein =

Homein Homong / Ho Mong / Wān Ho-möng
- Town
- Location within Myanmar
- Coordinates: 19°45′N 97°58′E
- Country: Myanmar
- Division: Shan State
- District: Langkho District
- Township: Langkho Township

Area
  - Total: 0.102 sq mi (0.26 km^{2})
- Elevation: 2,890 ft (881 m)

Population (2023)
  - Total: 3,842
  - Density: 37,700/sq mi (14,500/km^{2})
- Time zone: UTC+6:30 (MMT)

Homein (Burmese: ဟိုမိန်းမြို့, MLCTS: hui.min.mrui) also known as Homong, Homöng, Ho Mong and Wān Ho-möng, is a village in Langkho Township, Langkho District, southern Shan State, Myanmar. The town is the namesake town of Homein Subtownship, an unofficial subdivision of Langkho Township. The town itself is subdivided into 3 wards, simply numbered from one to three. The most populous ward is Ward One with 1,909 people as of 2023.

== Geography ==
Though there are no legal crossings, Homein lies in a porous mountainous area, 15 km northeast of Loi Lan mountain and 5.7 km west from the border with Mae Hong Son Province of Thailand. The Salween River to the immediate north isolates this region somewhat from the rest of the nation, a road (dubious quality) connects from Langkho to onward points.

== History ==
Owing to its location east of the Salween and the lack of adequate roads this village was of difficult access for the operations of the Tatmadaw. Beginning in 1985 it served as the headquarters of different Shan insurgent groups, such as the Mong Tai Army —until 1996 when this group ceased operations, the Shan State National Army and the Shan State Army - South. At that time the village also became a drug traffic hub where drug kingpin Khun Sa found security and carried his deals with impunity.

Khun Sa was probably one of the most colorful and controversial figures on the Myanmar drug scene. Despite being indicted on drug trafficking charges by a federal grand jury in Brooklyn, New York, in January 1990, he continued to live comfortably at his then headquarters at Homong near the Thai border opposite Mae Hong Son...By then he was officially the most wanted man in the world, indicted by the United States and referred to by then-US ambassador to Thailand William Brown as "the worst enemy the world has"...
