= Khun Sa =

Burmese warlord (1934–2007)

- ခွန်ဆာ Chang Chi-fu
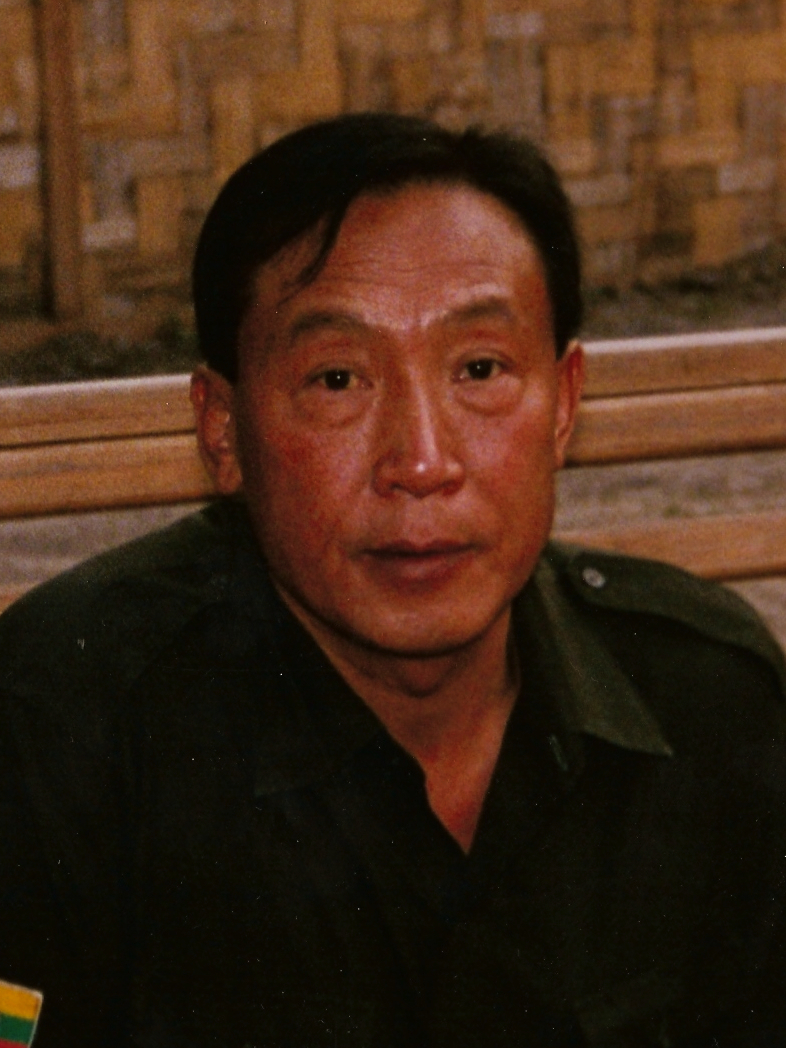
- Khun Sa at his jungle headquarters in Myanmar (Burma), 1988
- Born: Sai Sa; 17 February 1934; Loi Maw, Mongyai, British Burma
- Died: 26 October 2007 (aged 73); Yangon, Myanmar
- Burial place: Yayway Cemetery, Yangon, Myanmar
- Other names: จันทร์ จางตระกูล (Chan Changtrakul); Tun Sa; U Htet Aung
- Military career
- Allegiance: Mong Tai Army; Shan United Revolutionary Army
- Service years: 1985–1996
- Rank: Commander-in-chief
- Conflicts: 1967 Opium War, Internal conflict in Myanmar
- Other work: Shan warlord

Chinese name
- Traditional Chinese: 張奇夫
- Simplified Chinese: 张奇夫
Transcriptions
Standard Mandarin
- Hanyu Pinyin: Zhāng Qífū
- Wade–Giles: Chang Ch'i-fu

Khun Sa (Thai: จันทร์ จางตระกูล, Burmese: ခွန်ဆာ, pronounced [kʰʊ̀ɰ̃ sʰà]; 17 February 1934 – 26 October 2007) was an ethnic Han drug lord and warlord. He was born in Hpa Hpeung village, in the Loi Maw ward of Mongyai, Northern Shan State, Burma. Before he assumed the Shan name "Khun Sa" in 1976, he was known primarily by his Chinese name, Zhang Qifu (simplified Chinese: 张奇夫; traditional Chinese: 張奇夫; pinyin: Zhāng Qífū).

In his early life, Khun Sa received military equipment and training from both the Kuomintang and Burmese Army before claiming to fight for the independence of Shan State and going on to establish his own independent territory. He was dubbed the "Opium King" in Myanmar due to his massive opium smuggling operations in the Golden Triangle, where he was the dominant opium warlord from approximately 1976 to 1996. Although the American ambassador to Thailand called him "the worst enemy the world has," he successfully co-opted the support of both the Thai and Burmese governments at various times. After the American Drug Enforcement Administration uncovered and broke the link between Khun Sa and his foreign brokers, he "surrendered" to the Burmese government in 1996, disbanding his army and moving to Yangon with his wealth and mistresses. After his retirement some of his forces refused to surrender and continued fighting the government, but he engaged in "legitimate" business projects, especially mining and construction. He died in 2007 at the age of 73. Today, his children are prominent businesspeople in Myanmar.

== Biography ==
=== Early life ===
He was primarily known by his Han Chinese name, Chang Chi-fu (Zhang Qifu). When he was three years old, his father died. His Shan mother married a local tax collector, but two years later she died as well. He was raised largely by his Han grandfather, who was the headman of the village in which he was born, Loi Maw. The Han side of his family had been living in Shan State since the 18th century.

Although his stepbrothers were sent to missionary schools, the only formal education that Khun Sa received as a boy was spending a few years as a Buddhist novice, and for the rest of his life he remained functionally illiterate. In the early 1950s he received some basic military training from the Kuomintang, which had fled into the border regions of Burma from Yunnan upon its defeat in the Chinese Civil War in 1949. He formed his first independent band of young men when he was sixteen, and when his organization grew to several hundred men he became independent of the Kuomintang. After establishing his independence he frequently switched sides between the government and various rebel armies, as the situation suited him.

=== Militia leader and opium trade ===
In 1963 he re-formed his army into a local "Ka Kwe Ye" ("Home guard") unit, under the control of the northeast command of the Burmese army, which was based in nearby Lashio. In return for fighting local Shan rebels, the government allowed him to use their land and roads to grow and trade opium and heroin. By allowing them to be financed by opium production, the Burmese government hoped that these local militia units could be self-supporting. Many government-supported warlords, including Khun Sa, used their profits from the opium trade to buy large supplies of military equipment from the black markets in Laos and Thailand, and were soon better equipped than the Burmese army.

By the late 1960s Khun Sa was one of the most important and powerful militia leaders in Shan state. He held an important pass in Loi Maw, restricting the movements of local communist rebels. During the period, while he was nominally supporting the Burmese government, he maintained contact with Kuomintang intelligence agents.

Through the 1960s Khun Sa became one of Burma's most notorious drug traffickers. He challenged the local dominance of the Kuomintang remnants in Shan State, but in 1967 he was decisively defeated in a battle involving both the Kuomintang and the Laotian army on the Thai–Burma–Laos border. In that battle he led a convoy of 500 men and 300 mules into Laos, but the convoy was ambushed by Kuomintang forces en route. As the battle was going on, the Laotian army (which was also involved in the opium/heroin trade) bombed the battleground and stole the opium. This defeat demoralized him and his forces. The Laotian army continued to ambush his mule trains for the next few years, and his military strength declined.

=== Capture ===
In 1969, delegates from a local ethnic rebel group, the Shan State Army, began to hold secret talks with Khun Sa, attempting to persuade him to change sides and join them. He expressed interest, but details of the meeting were discovered by the Burmese army, and he was arrested On October 29, 1969, at Heho Airport in Taunggyi while returning from a business trip in Tachilek, near the Thai border. After his capture he was charged with high treason for his contacts with the rebels (but not for drug trafficking, which he had government permission to do), and he was imprisoned in Mandalay. While imprisoned Khun Sa read Sun Tzu's the Art of War and Luo Guanzhong's Romance of the Three Kingdoms, after which he developed a political philosophy that he exercised later in life: “In politics there are no lifelong friends, and no lifelong foes... They change according to the gains and losses. A good leader must be able to take advantage of every change and utilize it.”

After Khun Sa's arrest his militia unit dissolved, but his more loyal followers went underground, and in 1973 abducted two Soviet doctors from a hospital in Taunggyi, where they had been working. A division of soldiers from the Burmese army were tasked with rescuing the doctors, but failed. The doctors were ransomed for Khun Sa's freedom, and he was subsequently released in 1974. Khun Sa's release was secretly brokered by Thai General Kriangsak Chomanan. After his release Khun Sa maintained a good relationship with Chomanan, and in 1981 secretly contributed $50,000 US to support him in a Thai election campaign.

=== In Thailand ===
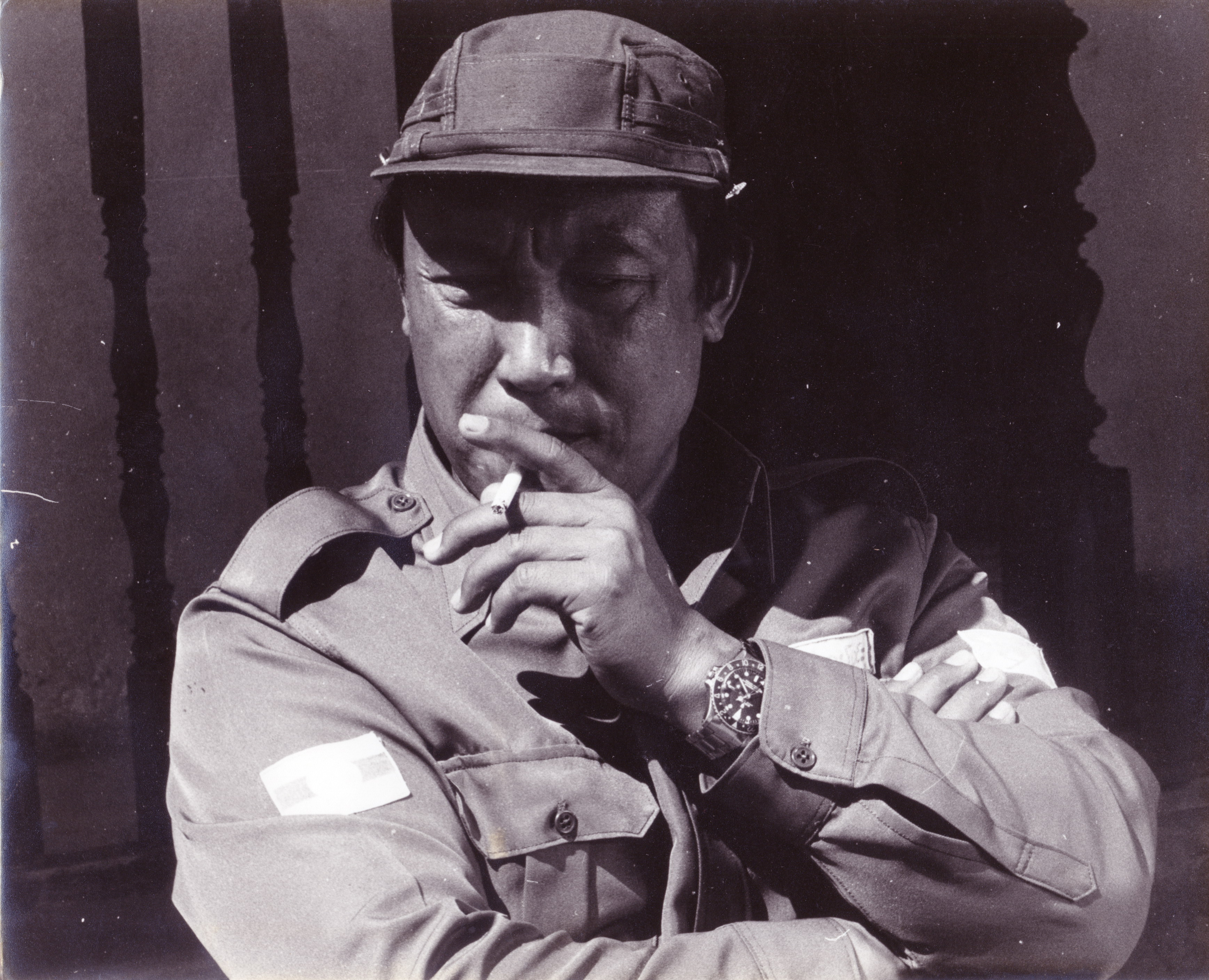
Khun Sa in 1974

During the next two decades, from 1974 to 1994, Khun Sa became the dominant opium warlord in the Golden Triangle. The share of heroin sold in New York originating from the Golden Triangle rose from 5% to 80% during this period, and Khun Sa was responsible for 45% of that trade. The DEA assessed that Khun Sa's heroin was 90% pure, "the best in the business". During the height of his power, in the 1980s, Khun Sa controlled 70% of the opium production in Burma, and built a large-scale infrastructure of heroin refining factories to dominate the market for that drug. He may have once supplied a quarter of the world's heroin supply. He commanded 20,000 men, and his personal army was better armed than the Burmese military. His notoriety led the American government to put a $2 million bounty on him. The American diplomat to Thailand referred to him as "the worst enemy the world has".

After his release Khun Sa went underground, and in 1976 rejoined and reformed his forces in Ban Hin Taek, in northern Thailand, close to the border with Burma. Soon after he began to reform his forces he adopted the Shan name "Khun Sa" (literally "Prince Prosperous") for the first time. He renamed his group the Shan United Army, began to claim that he was fighting for Shan autonomy against the Burmese government, and told international reporters that his people only grew drugs to pay for clothes and food.

In 1976, Sydney businessman Andrew Lowe alleged under formal questioning by the Australian Bureau of Narcotics that he had been the translator for a meeting between Nugan Hand Bank co-founder Michael Jon Hand and Khun Sa, who had managed to slip into Australia undetected, to arrange the finance of heroin imports from Hong Kong into the US. In 1977 he offered to take his territory's entire opium crop off the black market by selling it to the American government, but his offer was rejected.

Although Khun Sa was not the mastermind of the local drug trade, he controlled areas where drugs were grown and refined. The owners of the local heroin refineries were from Bangkok, Hong Kong, and Taiwan, and paid Khun Sa in exchange for the protection of his army. American government workers, who visited Khun Sa's compound in 1977 to negotiate with him, believed that the Thai government tolerated his presence on Thailand's northwestern border in order for his army to serve as a buffer between them and more radical revolutionary groups active in Laos and Burma at the time.

=== Return to Burma ===
After combined forces of the Thai military and remaining Kuomintang in Thailand defeated entrenched Communist rebels in Northwest Thailand in 1981, American officials began to pressure the Thai government to expel Khun Sa. In July 1981, Thai authorities announced a 50,000 baht ($2,000 US) bounty on his head. In August this was raised to 500,000 baht, "valid until 30 Sept. 1982". In October 1981 a 39-man unit of Thai Rangers and local rebel guerillas attempted to assassinate Khun Sa at the insistence of the US Drug Enforcement Administration. The attempt failed, and almost the entire unit was wiped out. In January 1982 a 1,000-man force of the Thai Army appeared at the borders of his base area. The Thai force consisted of Thai rangers from Pak Thong Chai, local paramilitary border police from Tak, and several airplanes and helicopter gunships. The battle lasted for four days, with heavy casualties on both sides. At the conclusion of the battle Khun Sa was forced to retreat back into Burma.

Within a year of losing his base in Thailand, Khun Sa rebuilt his army, defeated a local Burmese rebel group along the Burmese border between Shan State and Northwest Thailand, and took control of the region. He relocated his base of operations to the border town of Homein, established a local heroin-refining industry, and resumed a working relationship with the Burmese military and intelligence services, who again tolerated his presence in return for fighting other ethnic and communist rebels. He maintained a cordial relationship with the highest-ranking Burmese general in the region, Maung Aye, and established relationships with many foreign socialites and business people, including Lady and Lord Brockett, and James "Bo" Gritz. In 1984 his forces bombed the fortified residence of his rival, Li Wenhuan, in Chiang Mai. His organization maintained a trade organization in the government-held city of Taunggyi and re-established cordial relations with the Thai intelligence service after relocating to Burma.

=== Head of Mong Tai Army ===
In 1985, Khun Sa merged his Shan United Army with another rebel group, the "Tai Revolutionary Council" of Moh Heng, a faction of the Shan United Revolutionary Army (SURA), forming the Mong Tai Army (MTA). Through that alliance he gained control of a 150-mile Thai-Burma border area from his base at Ho Mong, a village near Mae Hong Son, to Mae Sai.

When the Americans donated several million dollars to the Burmese government for "drug suppression" in 1987, the Burmese military fabricated reports, leaked to the Thai press, that they had attacked and defeated Khun Sa in battles involving thousands of Burmese and Thai soldiers and several F-5E jets. However, these reports were completely false, and no action was taken against him. In reality, the Burmese and Thai governments were cooperating with him to build a highway into the region that he controlled. The Burmese army did conduct anti-narcotics operations at the time in many other areas of Burma, but the area controlled by Khun Sa was one of the few areas not targeted.

In 1988, Khun Sa was interviewed by Australian journalist Stephen Rice, who had crossed the border from Thailand into Burma illegally. Khun Sa offered to sell his entire heroin crop to the Australian Government for A$50m a year (paid in either cash or agricultural aid) for the next eight years, a move that would have immediately destroyed half the world's heroin supply. The Australian Government rejected the offer, with Senator Gareth Evans declaring: "The Australian Government is simply not in the business of paying criminals to refrain from criminal activity." In September 1989, when American photojournalist Karen Petersen interviewed the General for People magazine at his camp in Ner Mone, Shan State, he claimed he had a total army of 12,000 men. Soon thereafter, in January 1990 Khun Sa was indicted in absentia by an American federal grand jury on drug trafficking charges.

Following his indictment, he was interviewed by Canadian journalist Patricia Elliott at his base, accompanied by photojournalist Subin Kheunkaew, for the Bangkok Post. At the time he was acting as head of a coalition of Shan rebel forces, the Mong Tai Army (MTA), a force he then claimed consisted of 18,000 troops, a reserve of 5,000, and a local militia numbering 8,000. At this time he named his price for opium eradication as US$210 million in UN assistance, US$265 million in foreign investment and US$89.5 million in private aid for a program of crop substitution, education, and health care. The offer was rejected as blackmail by US authorities; and, rather than accepting his offer, the American government placed a $2 million bounty on him. He imposed a 40% tax on all opium growing, refining, and trafficking in return for protection from other warlords and the Myanmar government, but refused to discuss his total opium income with international reporters. To protect against air raids, he amassed a supply of locally made rockets and Surface-to-air-missiles purchased in Laos.

=== Surrender and retirement ===
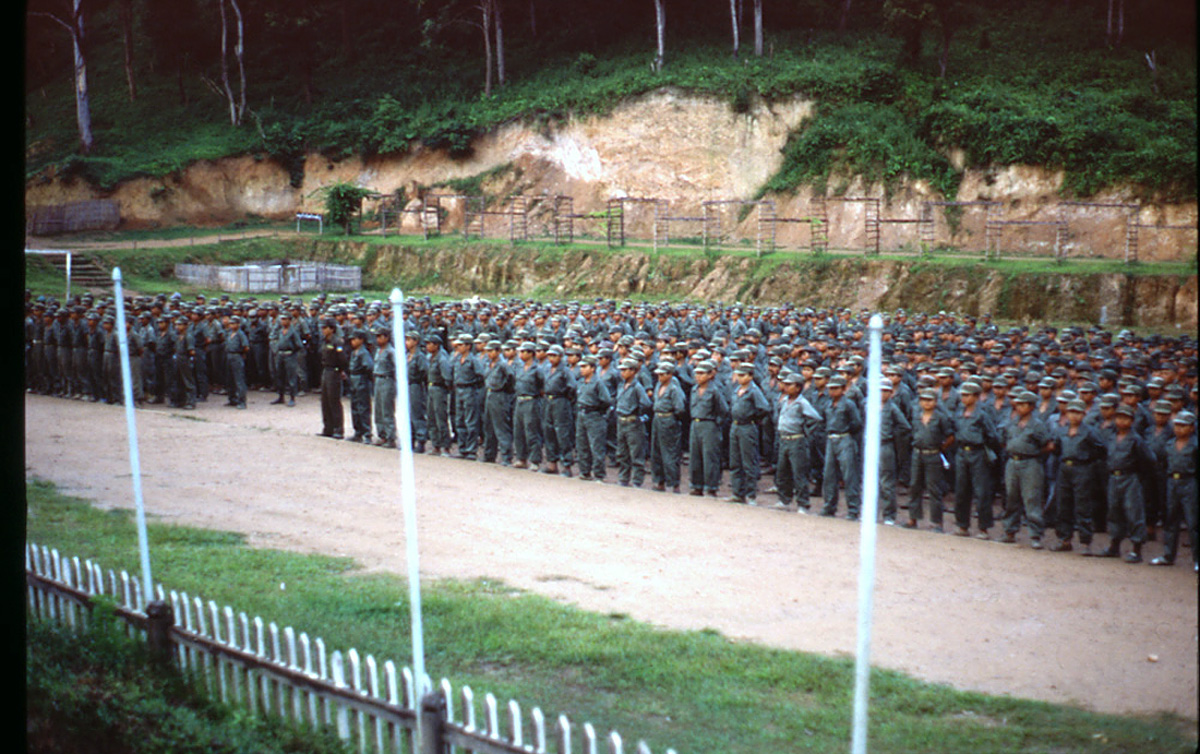
Khun Sa's forces at Ner Mone, Shan State, 1990.

In the 1990s Khun Sa's influence and power in the region declined. Part of this was due to the opening of new trade routes for heroin that ran from Yunnan to ports in southeastern China, which reduced his importance as a middleman for the drug along the Thai border. Other drug trafficking routes opened up to India, Laos, and Cambodia, which Khun Sa did not control, around this time he was confronted by the investigative journalist Roger Cook for an edition of ITV's The Cook Report on him & the drug trade in order to save the lives of two Birmingham girls in prison for drug trafficking. In the early 1990s his organization began to be challenged militarily by another nominally independent ethnic rebel organization in northern Myanmar, the United Wa State Army. This conflict put pressure on his leadership.

Khun Sa's surrender to the Burmese government coincided with, and may have been motivated by, a loss of support from other Shan leaders. After his front man within the Mong Tai Army, his longtime subordinate, Chairman Moh Heng, died of cancer in 1991, his control over the organization began to weaken. After Moh Heng's death he called a Shan "parliament", attracting hundreds of representatives from across the region. At this meeting he declared the creation of an independent Shan State, with himself as president. Many of his rivals from within the Mong Tai Army refused to accept his leadership, claiming that he was using the independence movement primarily as a front for his drug running operations, and formed a rival Shan organization, the "Shan State National Army".

Khun Sa exported his heroin through a network of underworld contacts and brokers based in Thailand, Yunnan, Macao, Hong Kong, and Singapore. Once he sold his products to these dealers, he had no control of where they were transported. Some of his business associates believed that he was only a front man for underworld Chinese drug interests, and many were terrified of him. By 1995 the DEA managed to discover and break the link between Khun Sa and his foreign brokers. Khun Sa's income then began to decline, and he began to consider retirement.

In public the Burmese military claimed that they wanted to hang Khun Sa. They conducted small raids against him, and they carried out public bonfires of "heroin" (largely stones and grass). Despite the Burmese leadership's public attitude towards Khun Sa, they understood that he had long controlled Burma's most lucrative export crop (estimated at $600 million US per year in 1997), and by the 1990s he had co-opted many of the most high-ranking military leaders in the country. By 1996 they made a secret agreement for Khun Sa to surrender to the Burmese government, under the understanding that he would receive government protection and that he would not be extradited.

Khun Sa surrendered to the Burmese government on January 5, 1996, gave up control of his army, and moved to Rangoon with a large fortune and four young Shan mistresses. Following Khun Sa's surrender, opium production in the Golden Triangle declined (this shift coincided with a dramatic rise in opium production in Afghanistan). During his retirement he became a prominent local businessman, with investments in Yangon, Mandalay and Taunggyi. After his retirement he described himself as "a commercial real estate agent with a foot in the construction industry". He ran a large ruby mine, and invested in a new highway running from Yangon to Mandalay. While living in Yangoon, Khun Sa maintained a low profile. His movements and communications with the outside world were restricted by the Burmese government, and his activities were monitored by Burmese intelligence.

Following Khun Sa's retirement and the voluntary disbandment of his private army, many of his followers joined local militias controlled by the Burmese army. Others, who had believed that he was a Shan patriot, were devastated and refused to accept the ceasefire. They went underground and continued to fight the Burmese army under the name of the "Shan State Army - South". The Burmese army somewhat disrupted the local opium trade, and the largest opium producer in the Golden Triangle became the United Wa State Army.

== Death ==
Khun Sa died on 26 October 2007 in Yangon at the age of 73. The cause of death was not known, though he had suffered from diabetes, high blood pressure, heart disease, and issues related to smoking. He was cremated four days after his death. His remains were cremated and buried at Yayway Cemetery, North Okkalapa Township, Yangon, Myanmar. Before his death he had decided not to be buried in Shan state, due to fears that his tomb would be vandalized or destroyed.

Soon after he died, in November 2007, a memorial was held for Khun Sa in his former stronghold in Thailand, Thoed Thai, close to the Myanmar border. Asked why they honoured Khun Sa, the local people said that he helped the town to develop: he built the first paved roads in the area, the first school, and a well-equipped, 60-bed hospital staffed by Chinese doctors. He was building a hydro power plant, but after his departure construction on that project was halted. He also built an 18-hole golf course for foreign visitors and a functional water and electrical infrastructure. The local Thai authorities ensured that the ceremony remained relatively simple.

== Family ==
Khun Sa was married to Nan Kyayon (died 1993) with whom he had eight children: five sons and three daughters. His children, listed in order of their birth, are Nang Long, Zarm Merng, Zarm Herng, Nang Kang, Zarm Zeun, Zarm Myat, Nang Lek, and Zarm Mya.

All of Khun Sa's children were educated abroad. As a reward for his retirement and relocation to Yangon, his children were allowed to run and operate business interests in Myanmar. At the time of his death, in 2007, his favorite son was running a hotel and casino in the border town of Tachilek, while one of his daughters was a well-established businesswoman in Mandalay.

In 1989, Khun Sa told Karen Petersen, a reporter for People magazine, that he also had a second wife in Bangkok. When he moved to Yangon he brought four young mistresses with him. All four were teenagers from Kengtung, in eastern Shan State.

== In popular culture ==
Khun Sa is mentioned in Japanese manga and anime Black Lagoon, for his role on the drug trade in Southeast Asia as well as one of his subordinates being targeted by the NSA.

Khun Sa was featured in a 1990 edition of The Cook Report entitled "Heroin Highway".

Khun Sa is portrayed by Ric Young in the 2007 film American Gangster.

Khun Sa is mentioned in Hong Kong movie To Be Number One in which real life triad boss Ng Sik-ho connects to him circa 1973 in order to supply Hong Kong domestic supply and export. The film includes footage of Khun Sa.

Khun Sa is mentioned in Jo Nesbø's Cockroaches, the second novel in the Harry Hole series.

== Sources ==
- "Notorious Asian Drug Lord is Dead". BBC. October 30, 2007. Retrieved January 30, 2018.
- Boyle, Joe. "Burma's uncrowned opium king". BBC. October 30, 2007. Retrieved February 25, 2018.
- "Khun Sa – Opium Warlord". Doi Mae Salong. August 27, 2011. Retrieved January 30, 2018.
- "Khun Sa". The Economist. November 8, 2007. Retrieved January 13, 2018.
- Elliott, P.W. "How 'Prince of Death' Sees Bright Future for Shan". Bangkok Post. July 19, 1990, p. 8.
- Elliott, P.W. "A Man Who Only Wants the Right to 'Enjoy His Own Garden'...at a Price". Bangkok Post. July 19, 1990, p. 9.
- Elliott, P.W. "Peaceful Village Home to Liberation Struggle". Bangkok Post. July 29, 1990, p. 8.
- Fuller, Thomas. "Khun Sa, Golden Triangle Drug King, Dies at 73". New York Times. November 5, 2007. Retrieved January, 2018.
- Hail, John. "Long and Hazardous Hunt for the Opium Warlord". Bangkok Post. January 11, 1982, p. 9.
- Lintner, Bertil. Burma in Revolt: Opium and Insurgency Since 1948. Silkworm Books. 1999.
- Lintner, Bertil. "Death of a Drug Lord". Asia Times Online. November 1, 2007. Retrieved January 14, 2018.
- Petersen, Karen. "For a Heroin King in the Golden Triangle, Death and Taxes Rule". People Magazine. June 25, 1990. Retrieved July 6, 2019.
- "Questions Without Notice. Khun Sa: Heroin Supply". Parliament of Australia. April 26, 1988. Retrieved January 30, 2018.
- Smith, Martin. "Burma: Insurgency and the Politics of Ethnicity". Zed Books. 1991.
- Sumondis, Pummarai, Veera Prateepchaikul, and Supradit Kanwanich. "The Battle Against the Opium Warlord". Bangkok Post. January 31, 1982, pp. 20–21.
- Unkovich, David and David Early. "'Prince of Death' Road Trip-Khun Sa Memorial". GT-Rider.com. November 7, 2007. Retrieved January 13, 2008.
