= Yawd Serk =

Shan political leader

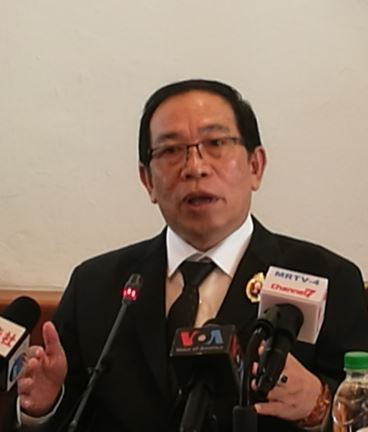
- Yawd Serk at RCSS/SSA press conference (September 2017)
- Born: 1959 (age 66–67)
- Military career
- Allegiance: Shan State Army - South
- Service years: 1996–present
- Rank: Lieutenant General
- Conflicts: Internal conflict in Myanmar
- Other work: Chairman of the RCSS/SSA

Yawd Serk (Shan: ယွတ်ႈသိုၵ်း, Burmese: ယွက်စစ်) is a Shan ethnic and political leader in Myanmar (Burma), who was chairman of the Restoration Council of Shan State and commander in chief of the Shan State Army - South (SSA-S) until his resignation on 3 February 2014. He was a major contributor to peace talks between major Shan rebel factions and the government of Myanmar in the 2000s and 2010s.
