= Opium production in Myanmar =

A world map of the world's primary opium or heroin producers. The Golden Triangle region, which Myanmar is part of, is pinpointed in this map.

Opium production in Myanmar has historically been a major contributor to Myanmar's gross domestic product (GDP). Myanmar is the world's largest producer of opium, producing some 25% of the world's opium, and forms part of the Golden Triangle. The opium industry was a monopoly during colonial times and has since been illegally tolerated, encouraged, and informally taxed by corrupt officials in the Tatmadaw (Armed forces of Myanmar), Myanmar Police Force and ethnic armed organisations, primarily as the basis for heroin manufacture.

The United Nations Office on Drugs and Crime’s (UNODC) 2024 Myanmar Opium Survey estimated the area under opium poppy cultivation in Myanmar to be 45,200 hectares. Although this represented a slight decrease in 2023, nationwide reductions were uneven and some areas saw expansion. Opium production is concentrated in the Shan and Kachin states, but there has been expansion in Chin and Kayah states in recent years.

Opium production is mainly concentrated in the Shan and Kachin states. Due to widespread poverty, opium production is attractive to farmers; the financial return from poppy is estimated to be 17 times more than that of rice. Despite the continuing shift within Myanmar towards synthetic drug production, specifically methamphetamine in areas around the Golden Triangle, organized crime groups still generate substantial profits from the business of trafficking heroin within Southeast Asia. In 2024, domestic heroin consumption was estimated at 5.9 tons, with a monetary value ranging between US$63 and US$256 million. Between 52 and 140 tons of heroin were potentially exported, with a value between US$468 million and US$1.26 billion. Heroin continues to pose a significant public security and health challenge for neighbouring countries, as Myanmar remains the major supplier of opium and heroin in East Asia and Southeast Asia, as well as Oceania.

Economic specialists indicate that recent trends in growth of the regional narcotics industry have the potential to widen the gap between the rich and the poor in Myanmar, empowering politically powerful criminal rackets at the expense of democracy. The United Nations Office on Drugs and Crime has raised concerns over the continued shift away from opium cultivation and heroin production in Myanmar towards synthetic drugs. Countries in Southeast Asia, and particularly the Mekong region, have collectively witnessed sustained increases in seizures of methamphetamine over the last decade, totaling over 169 tons and a record of over 1.1 billion methamphetamine tablets in 2023, more than any other part of the world, with Myanmar representing one of the world's largest sources of the drug. In April and May 2020, Myanmar authorities reported Asia's largest ever drug operation in Shan State, seizing 193 million methamphetamine tablets, hundreds of kilograms of crystal methamphetamine as well as some heroin, and over 162,000 litres and 35.5 tons of drug precursors as well as sophisticated production equipment and several staging and storage facilities.

== History ==
Opium has been present in Myanmar, formerly known as Burma, since as early as the 1750s, when the Konbaung dynasty was in power. The United States provided economic aid to the country then known as Burma in 1948 to reduce the opium trade. Between 1974 and 1978, Burma received eighteen helicopters from the US for opium caravan interception.

In 1990, Myanmar was producing more than half of the world's opium. The percentage dropped to one-third by 1998. In 1999, Myanmar set a goal to become opium-free by 2014. In 2012, some 300,000 households in Myanmar were involved in the industry.

Myanmar is one of three countries in the Golden Triangle, with Thailand and Laos forming the other two arms. In 1990, opium production in this region accounted for about half of the world's consumption, but was reduced to about a third by 1998.

== Production ==
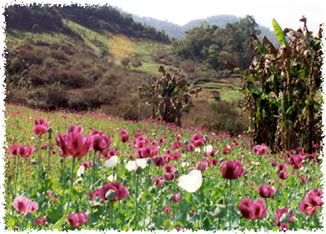
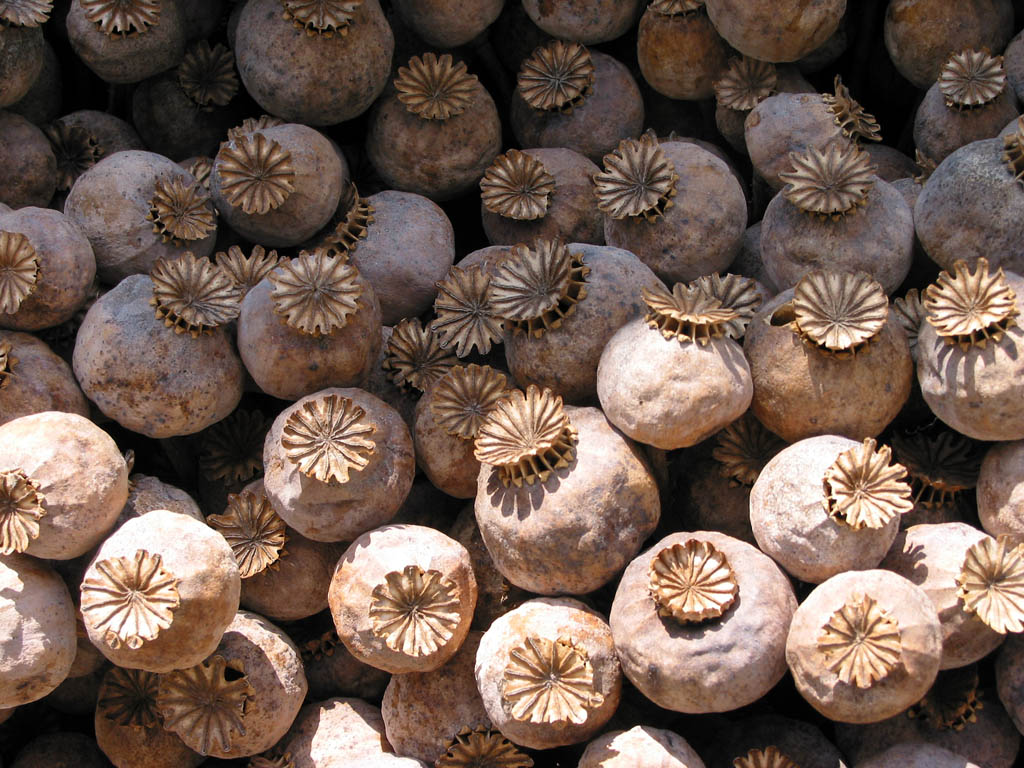
Left: A field of opium. Right: Poppy seed pods

In 2023, Myanmar overtook Afghanistan as the world's largest producer of opium. Since the 1990s, Myanmar has been described as "the world's unrivaled leader in opiate production", and by 2012 produced some 25% of the world's opium. Production is mainly concentrated in the Shan and Kachin states.

On an annual rate, the production of opium in the country was estimated to be some 150 tonnes (150 long tons; 170 short tons) in 1956. In more recent years, following a spike in production until 2014, opium poppy cultivation in Myanmar has fluctuated. According to the United Nations Office on Drugs and Crime’s (UNODC) Myanmar Opium Survey 2024, in 2024, the area under opium poppy cultivation in Myanmar was estimated at 45,200 hectares. That is a 4% decrease from the 47,100 hectares estimated to be under cultivation in 2023. This represented the first decline after three years of expanding cultivation. The national trend of reductions in poppy cultivation started in 2014, when the area under cultivation was estimated at 57,600 ha, which levelled off in 2020 and rose for three consecutive years until 2024. According to UNODC, the reasons for this decline are varied and may relate to broader dynamics of the regional opiate economy as well as the ongoing internal conflict, and it remains unclear if this represents a new chapter in illicit cultivation.

Despite the modest drop in the area of cultivation, according to UNODC: “The amount of opium produced in Myanmar remains close to the highest levels we have seen since we first measured it more than 20 years ago … As conflict dynamics in the country remain intense and the global supply chains adjust to the ban in Afghanistan, we see significant risk of a further expansion over the coming years.” In the months following the February 2021 coup, UNODC's representative for Southeast Asia and the Pacific noted that “The opium economy is really a poverty economy”, and raised concerns that the likely economic impacts of the coup would lead people in poor and poverty-stricken areas to look to opium economy to make money: “Probably 12 months out, 18 months out, we’re going to be looking at an expansion unless past history is wrong. There’s a cycle of this happening in the country over its history”.

Opium production is mainly concentrated in Shan and Kachin states, but there has been an expansion in other areas. The decrease in cultivation noted in 2024 was uneven. With most states seeing declines from 2023, some, notably Chin and Kayah, saw increases from the previous year. Compared to 2023, Shan State showed the largest decrease in absolute terms of cultivated hectares (down by 1,500 hectares, or 4%). North and South Shan states also saw decreases (4% and 9%, respectively), but East Shan showed a 10% increase from 2023. Kachin, Chin and Kayah states saw estimated increases of 10%, 18% and 8%, respectively. Shan continued to be the major cultivating state, accounting for about 88% (39,700 ha) of the overall opium poppy area. The state's sub-regions of South, North, and East Shan accounted for 45%, 22% and 20% of total cultivation in 2024, respectively. Kachin State accounted for 6% (2,800 ha), and Chin and Kayah States together for 3% (1,350 ha).

Despite the intensifying shift towards synthetic drug production in Myanmar, specifically methamphetamine in the Golden Triangle, organized crime groups still generate substantial profits from the business of trafficking heroin within Southeast Asia.

According to the latest UNODC report, Opium production in Myanmar has reached the highest level ever, as the cultivated area rose about 17% in a year to just over 53,000 hectares. This makes Myanmar the main global source of illegal opium. The report claims that the civil war, the collapsed economy, and higher opium prices bring farmers to turn to Opium growing.

== Drug movement ==
Before the 1980s, heroin was typically transported from Myanmar to Thailand, before being trafficked by sea to Hong Kong, which was and remains the major transit point at which heroin enters the international market. In the 21st century, drug trafficking has circumvented to southern China (from Yunnan, Guizhou, Guangxi, Guangdong) because of a growing market for drugs in China, before reaching Hong Kong.

== The Burmese economy and opium ==
The prominence of major drug traffickers has allowed them to penetrate and permeate other sectors of the economy of Myanmar, including the banking, airline, hotel and infrastructure industries. Their investment in infrastructure has allowed them to generate more profits, facilitate drug trafficking and money laundering.

Due to the ongoing, rural-based insurgencies within Myanmar, many farmers have little alternative but to engage in opium production, which is used to make heroin. Most of the money earned from opium sales go into the drug barons' pockets; the amount left is used to sustain the livelihood of the farmers. Economic specialists indicate that recent trends in growth have the potential to widen the gap between the rich and the poor in the country, empowering politically powerful criminal rackets at the expense of democracy.

== Eradication programme ==
In 2000, the Yunnan provincial government of China established a poppy substitution development program for Myanmar. Yunnan subsidized Chinese businesses to cultivate cash crops like rubber and banana in Myanmar and allowed for their importation to China without tariffs. The program reduced poppy cultivation in Myanmar, but the reception was mixed because most of the economic benefits flowed to Chinese businesses.

With the establishment of the democratic government after the rule of a military junta, there is hope that opium eradication would be a serious public policy. The new government has taken steps to reform the system, but the ground situation is otherwise, as there is an upsurge in its production and this is attributed in a report by the UN as due to "the resurgence in opium production in Southeast Asia is the demand for opiates, both locally and in the region in general".

Government reports claim that in 2012, a fourfold increase in the elimination of poppy fields was effected, amounting to 24,000 hectares of poppy fields. In 2012, land poppy cultivation increased 17 percent, the highest increase in eight years. UNODC data indicate that after a peak in 2011 to 2012 (23,718 hectares), the results of eradication efforts declined, and in 2023 to 2024, just 2,502 hectares of cultivation were eradicated.

== See also ==
- Internal conflict in Myanmar
- Crime in Myanmar
