= Myanmar–United States relations =

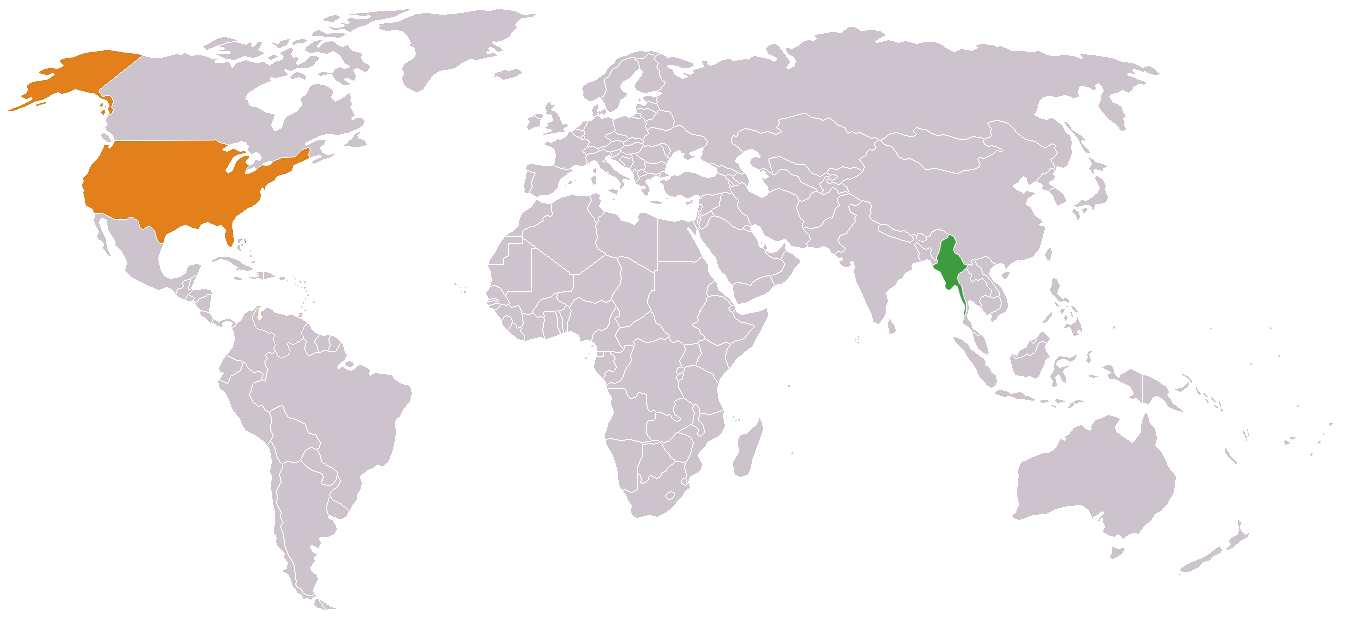

- Myanmar: United States

Diplomatic mission
- Burmese Embassy, Washington, D.C.: United States Embassy, Yangon

Myanmar (Burma) and the United States had a diplomatic contact prior to the British colonial period. They established formal diplomatic relations in 1947 in anticipation of Burma's independence.

In the early 1950s, the United States supported elements of the defeated Chinese Nationalist military which fled to Burma after their defeat in the Chinese Civil War. This support caused strain in the Burma-United States relationship.

The political relationship between the United States of America and Myanmar began to face major problems following the 1988 military coup and the junta's outbursts of repression against pro-democracy activists. Subsequent campaigns of repression, including the repression of protestors in 2007 and 2021, further strained the relationship. In the 2010s, following signs of democratisation and economic liberalisation, the United States lifted sanctions with Hillary Clinton, as Secretary of State, calling for the mending of US relations with Myanmar. However, the US re-imposed targeted sanctions following the 2017 Rohingya genocide and the 2021 Myanmar coup d'état, focusing on individuals involved in atrocities to prevent ineffective sanctions or sanctions that would diminish US influence in Myanmar.

In a Gallup public opinion poll conducted in 2012, 30% of Myanmar people approved of U.S. leadership, with 67% expressing uncertainty and 3% expressing disapproval.

== History ==
=== 19th century relations ===
The first contact between the Konbaung Dynasty of Burma and the United States were the letters sent from King Mindon in 1856–57 to Presidents Franklin Pierce and James Buchanan. King Mindon hoped for a bilateral treaty that would help provide some protection against the British Empire.

Burma–United States relations
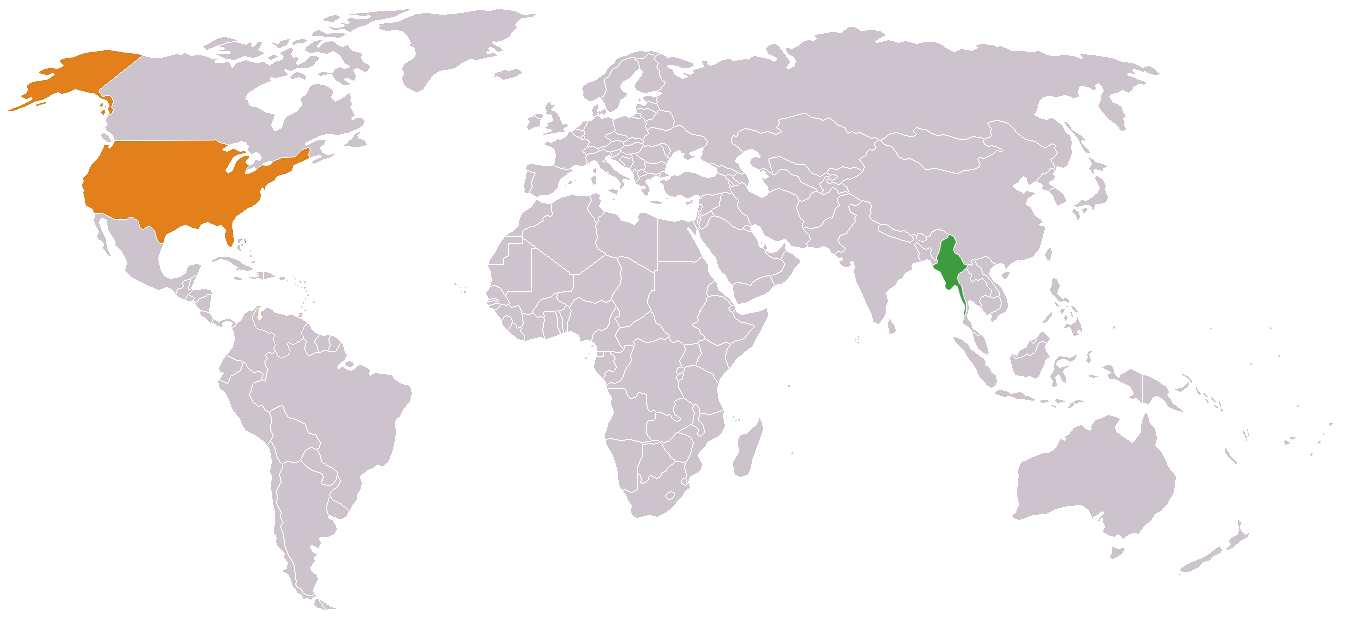

- Burma: United States

Later on March 20, 1879, former US President Ulysses Grant visited Rangoon for a short visit on a round-the-world tour following his retirement from the presidency. At the time of his visit, lower Burma, including Rangoon, had been lost to the British in the Second Anglo-Burmese War. Grant was impressed with Rangoon and predicted it would become one of the biggest and most important cities in Asia.

=== Mid-20th century relations ===
Burma–United States relations
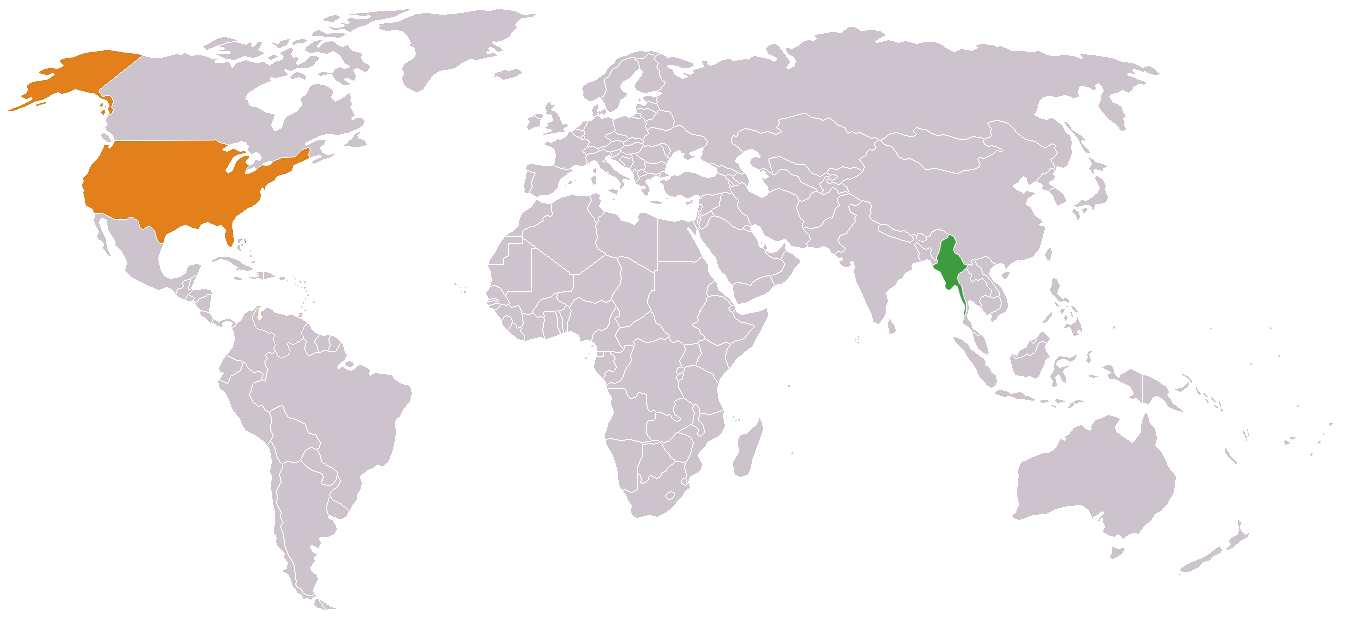

- Burma: United States

Diplomatic mission
- Burmese Embassy, Washington, D.C.: United States Embassy, Yangon

The US Embassy Rangoon was established 19 September 1947 in anticipation of Burma's independence with Earl L. Packer as the first Chargé d'Affaires ad interim. The first ambassador Jerome Klahr Huddle was appointed on 17 October later that year.

After their defeat in the Chinese Civil War, parts of the Nationalist army retreated south and crossed the border into Burma. The United States supported these Nationalist forces because the United States hoped they would harass the People's Republic of China from the southwest, thereby diverting Chinese resources from the Korean War. The Burmese government protested and international pressure increased. Beginning in 1953, several rounds of withdrawals of the Nationalist forces and their families were carried out. In 1960, joint military action by China and Burma expelled the remaining Nationalist forces from Burma, although some went on to settle in the Burma-Thailand borderlands.

In response to Prime Minister U Nu's policies of moderate socialism in the 1950s, the United States Embassy in Rangoon translated and published George Orwell's Animal Farm in Burmese, as a propaganda tool. As of 2023, this is the only one of Orwell's works to have been translated into the language.

Despite the relationship between the two countries being periodically troubled, the United States generally tried to maintain good relations with Burma, for multiple reasons. The country was and remains a strategically important one, being on the Bay of Bengal and bordering both India and China. Rangoon hosted both the Soviet and Chinese embassies, which made it a good listening post during the Sino-Soviet split of the 1960s. Burmese heroin was flooding the United States, and stopping this trade, and the money laundering that came with it, was a priority.

=== 8888 Uprising and 1990s relations ===
The 8888 Uprising in 1988 saw mass protests in Burma against the totalitarian rule of General Ne Win. American House Representative Stephen Solarz arrived in Burma in September to encourage reform echoing the policy of the U.S. government towards Burma. Protestors demonstrated outside the United States embassy in Yangon hoping for international attention and American intervention. After six months, the protests led to a bloody military coup by the State Law and Order Restoration Council (SLORC). SLORC imposed martial law and cracked down on protests, including killing 500 protestors outside the United States embassy.

As David I. Sternberg wrote, "Essentially, U.S. policy from 1988 through 2001 was on a single track: human rights. Economic, strategic, narcotics, even humanitarian issues were not pursued." Many believed that the new military regime would collapse if the countries refused to recognize the legitimacy of the coup. The United States imposed the most restrictive sanctions of the many countries that cut aid and placed sanctions. In 1989, the military junta changed the country's name from Burma to Myanmar alongside many other English names like that of Yangon/Rangoon. The United States remains one of a few countries to still do not recognize the 1989 changes arguing that the name change was made without the consent of the people by an illegitimate government. The United States downgraded its level of representation in Myanmar from Ambassador to Chargé d'Affaires after the government's crackdown on the democratic opposition in 1988 and its failure to honour the results of the 1990 parliamentary election.

The Massachusetts state government attempted to sanction Myanmar directly in 1996 but those efforts proved unconstitutional. In addition, since May 1997, the U.S. Government has prohibited new investment by U.S. persons or entities. A number of U.S. companies exited the Myanmar market even prior to the imposition of sanctions due to a worsening business climate and mounting criticism from human rights groups, consumers, and shareholders. The United States has also imposed countermeasures on Myanmar due to its inadequate measures to eliminate money laundering.

=== 2000s relations ===
Later, the United States federal government imposed broad sanctions against Myanmar under several different legislative and policy vehicles. The Burmese Freedom and Democracy Act (BFDA), passed by Congress and signed by the President in 2003, included a ban on all imports from Myanmar, a ban on the export of financial services to Myanmar, a freeze on the assets of certain Burmese financial institutions, and extended visa restrictions on Burmese officials. The BFDA was accompanied by Executive Order 13310 banning the import of products and export of financial services to Myanmar signed in the aftermath of the Depayin massacre. Congress has renewed the BFDA annually until the 2010s.

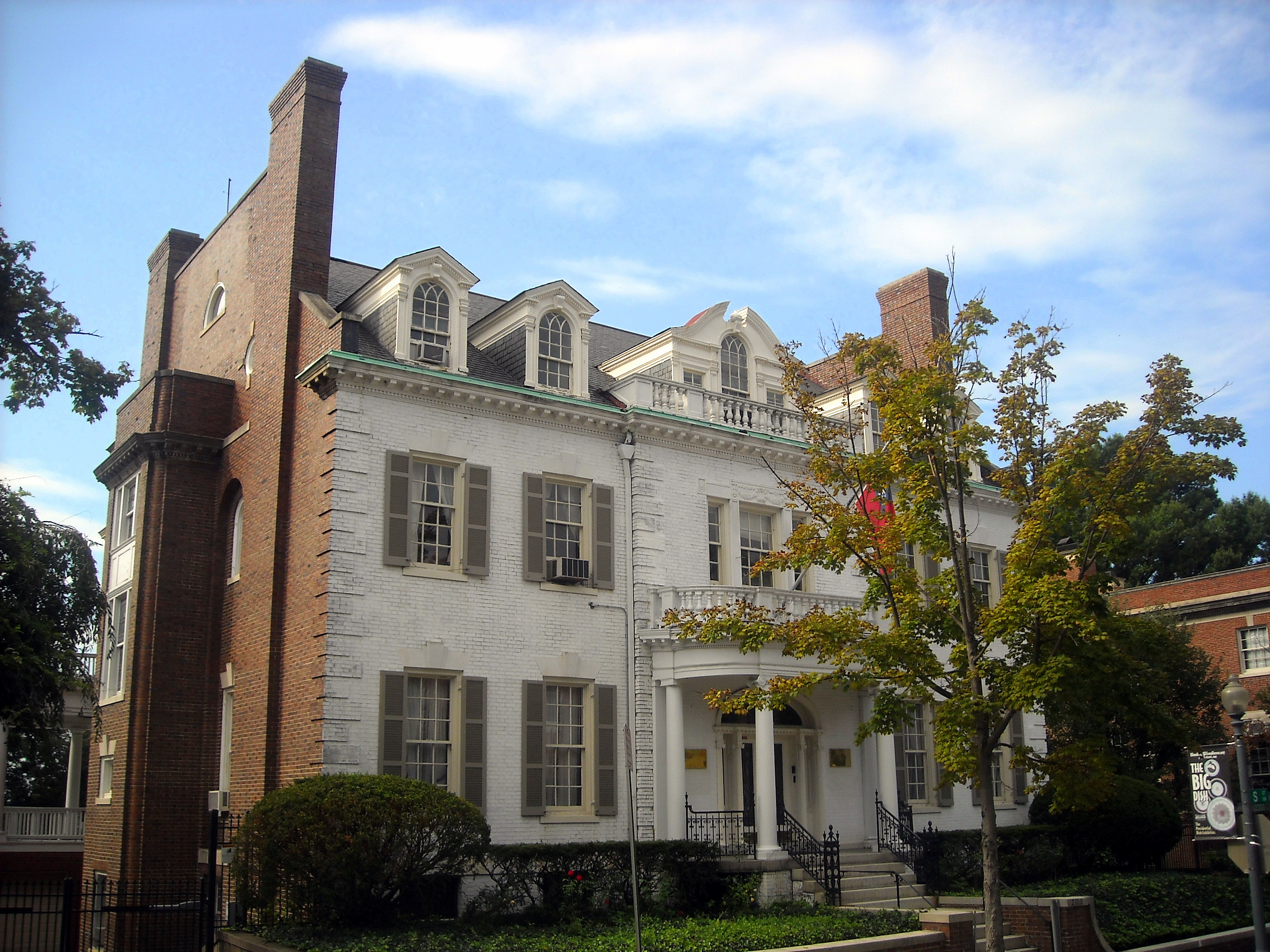
Embassy of Myanmar in Washington, D.C.

The Saffron Revolution in 2007 and 2008 saw another period of mass social unrest in Myanmar. In response, the U.S. Department of Treasury designated 25 senior Burmese government officials as subject to an asset block under Executive Order 13310 on 27 September 2007. Later on October 19, President George W. Bush announced a new Executive Order (E.O. 13448) expanding the authority to block assets to individuals who are responsible for human rights abuses and public corruption, as well as those who provide material and financial support to the regime. On 30 April 2008, Executive Order 13464 further expanded the authority to freeze assets, which was used to seize 110 individual entities’ assets. These restrictions would remain in place until 2016.

As Cyclone Nargis ravaged the country in 2008 and the military government pushed forward with their constitutional referendum, the US House of Representatives voted unanimously in favour of House Resolution 4286 awarding a congressional gold medal to Aung San Suu Kyi for her commitment to peace, nonviolence, human rights and democracy.

Due to its particularly severe violations of religious freedom, the United States has designated Myanmar a Country of Particular Concern (CPC) under the International Religious Freedom Act. Myanmar is also designated a Tier 3 Country in the Trafficking in Persons Report for its use of forced labour, and is subject to additional sanctions as a result. The political relationship between the United States and Myanmar worsened after the 1988 military coup and violent suppression of pro-democracy demonstrations. Subsequent repression, including the brutal crackdown on peaceful protestors in September 2007, further strained the relationship.

=== 2010s relations ===
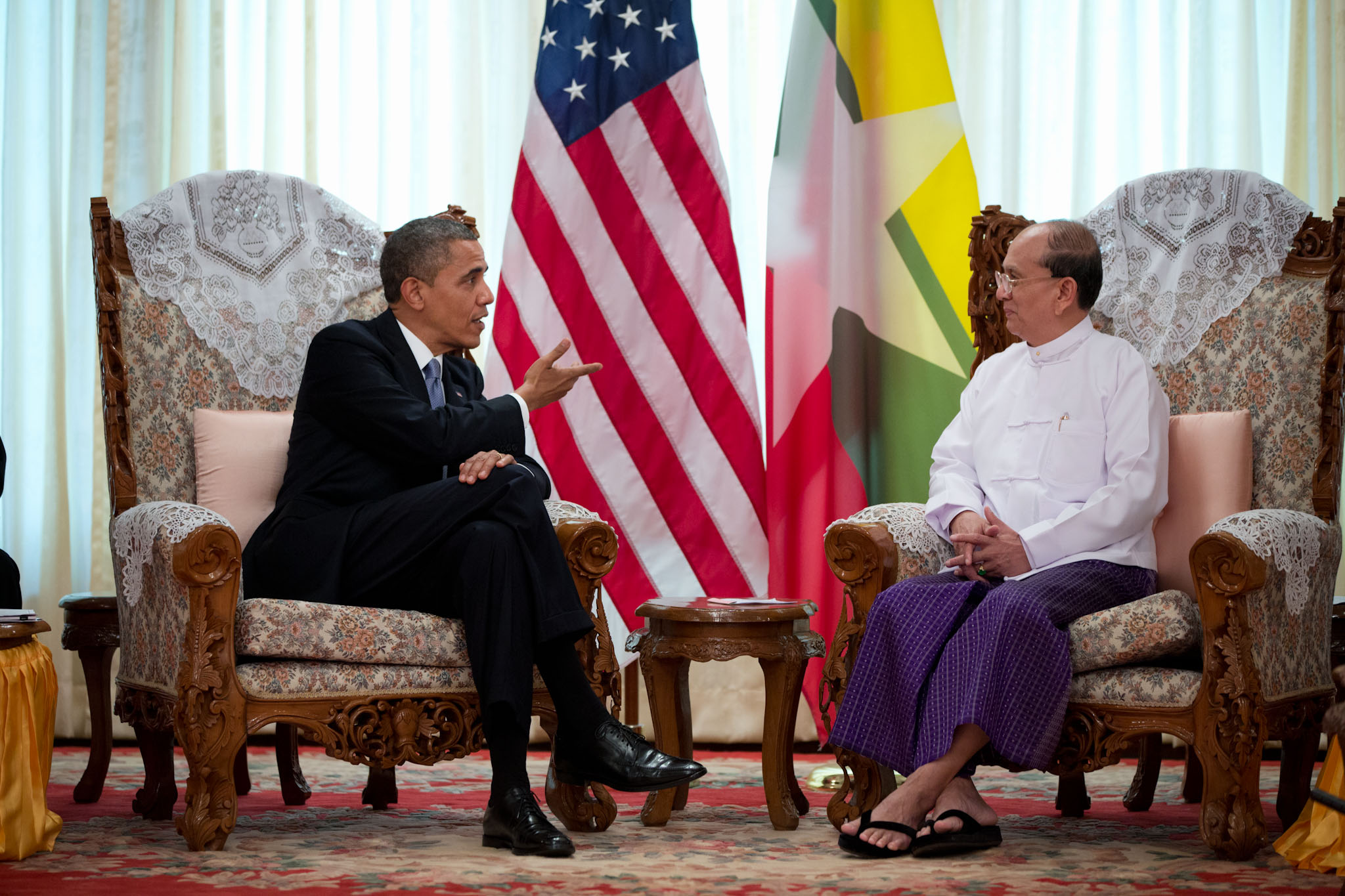
Thein Sein meets U.S. President Barack Obama in Yangon, November 19, 2012

In the wake of reforms pursued by the military under the new 2008 Constitution of Myanmar. US Secretary of State, Hillary Clinton, visited Myanmar in November–December 2011. In this visit, the first by a Secretary of State since 1955, Clinton met with the President of Myanmar, Thein Sein, in the capital Naypyidaw, and later met with democracy activist Aung San Suu Kyi in Yangon. The US announced a relaxation of curbs on aid and raised the possibility of an exchange of ambassadors. On January 13, 2012, the US Secretary of State Hillary Clinton announced the US will exchange ambassadors with Myanmar, after a landmark Burmese political prisoner amnesty.

On Thursday, May 17, 2012, President Barack Obama nominated Derek Mitchell to the U.S. Senate for confirmation to serve as Ambassador to Myanmar. After being confirmed by the U.S. Senate in late June, Derek Mitchell, the first U.S. ambassador to Myanmar in 22 years formally assumed his job on July 11, 2012, by presenting his credentials to President Thein Sein at the presidential mansion in the capital Naypyidaw.

In July 2012 the United States formally eased sanctions on Myanmar. Secretary of State Hillary Clinton announced plans in the spring of 2012 for a “targeted easing” of sanctions to allow American dollars to enter the country. President Obama ordered the U.S. Treasury Department to issue two licenses, one giving special permission for investment in Myanmar and the other allowing financial services. Although plans were announced in May, the change awaited detailed reporting requirements on U.S. companies doing business in Myanmar and the creation of mechanisms to prevent U.S. economic ties to the military, individuals and companies involved in human rights abuses.

President Obama also issued an executive order expanding existing sanctions against individuals to include those who threaten Myanmar's political restructuring process. This meant that The United States would not allow investment in military entities owned by Myanmar's armed forces or its Ministry of Defense. The United States continued to block businesses or individuals from transacting with any “specially designated nationals” or businesses that they control — allowing Washington to stop money from flowing to groups disrupting the reform process or blocking peace. Businesses with more than $500,000 in investment in the country were required to file an annual report with the State Department, with details on workers’ rights, land acquisitions and any payments of more than $10,000 to government entities and state-owned enterprises.

In May 2013, Thein Sein became the first Myanmar president to visit the US White House in 47 years and President Barack Obama praised the former general for political and economic reforms, and the cessation of tensions between Myanmar and the US. Political activists objected to the visit due to concerns over human rights abuses in Myanmar but Obama assured Thein Sein that Myanmar will receive the support from the US. Prior to President Thein Sein, the last Myanmar leader to visit the White House was Ne Win in September 1966. The two leaders discussed Thein Sein's intention to release more political prisoners, the institutionalisation of political reform and rule of law, and ending ethnic conflict in Myanmar—the two governments agreed to sign a bilateral trade and investment framework agreement on 21 May 2013.

American companies and people were allowed to invest in the state-owned Myanmar Oil and Gas Enterprise leading to criticism by human rights groups. New York-based Human Rights Watch said that the reporting requirements would not adequately prevent new investments from fueling abuses and undermining reform. HRW's director Arvind Ganesan said that it looked as if the U.S. had caved to industry pressure undercutting Aung San Suu Kyi and others promoting accountability in the reformed military government.

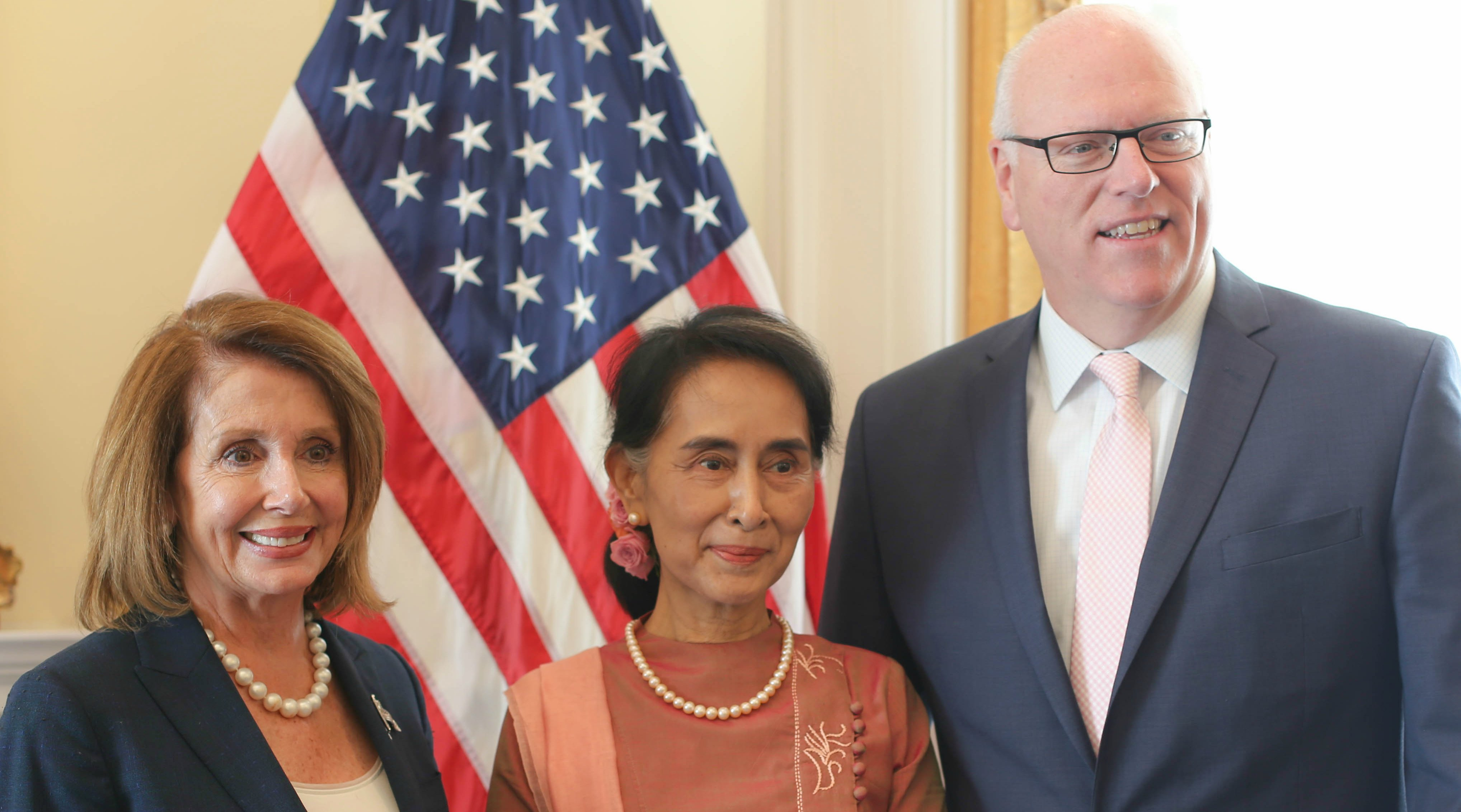
Pelosi, Crowley and Aung San Suu Kyi in US Capitol

After the NLD's historic election win in 2015 with a transfer of power, the new government led by Aung San Suu Kyi enjoyed friendlier relations with the U.S. In September 2016, Aung San Suu Kyi as State Counsellor of Myanmar visited United States and which has set a mile stone for the relationship between United States and Myanmar issuing a joint statement in which President Obama is lifting the Executive Order-based framework of the Myanmar sanctions while restoring Generalized System of Preferences (GSP) trade benefits to Myanmar.

==== Response to Rohingya Genocide ====
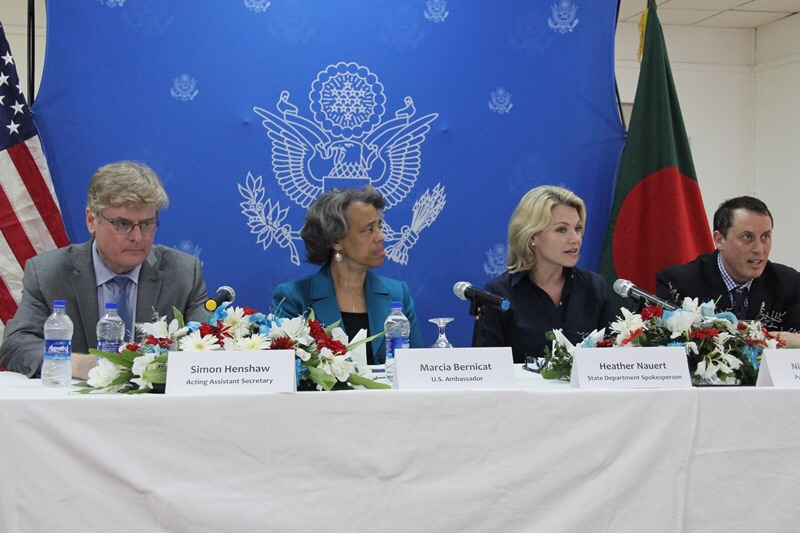
U.S. Spokesperson Nauert Participates in Press Conference in Cox's Bazar, Bangladesh

In October 2017, in response to the 600,000 refugees displaced from their homes during the ongoing Rohingya crisis, the United States withdrew military aid to some Myanmar units responsible for the displacement. The State Department issued a statement, saying current and former senior leadership of the Burmese military would no longer be considered for the JADE Act travel waivers, that no units and officers involved in the Rohingya persecution would be eligible for U.S. assistance programs, and that senior security forces of Myanmar were no longer invited to attend U.S-sponsored events. The State Department reiterated support for Myanmar's democratization process as well as relief for the persecuted Rohingya.

The United States did not immediately re-impose sanctions on Myanmar as a response to this, which was met with criticism by Congressional lawmakers and human rights activists. In the October 2017 Congressional hearing, Deputy Assistant Secretary of State for East Asian and Pacific Affairs Patrick Murphy explained that besides running the risk of inefficacy, imposing sanctions might weaken the United States’ influence on Myanmar.

In December 2017, the United States imposed a blacklist on Maung Maung Soe, chief of the Myanmar army's Western Command, which was responsible for the violence towards the Rohingya. Following an Executive Order by President Trump enabling the Treasury Department, the Office of Foreign Assets Control froze his United States assets and bars Americans from engaging in business transactions with him.

In August 2018, the United States Treasury Department enacted these economic sanctions on four Myanmar military and police commanders in a statement, referring to the violence against the Rohingya as “ethnic cleansing.” Those targeted by this sanction are: Aung Kyaw Zaw, Khin Maung Soe, Khin Hlaing, Thura San Lwin, as well as the Burmese Army's 33rd Light Infantry Division, and the 99th Light Infantry Division.

In September 2018, the State Department released a report titled Documentation of Atrocities in Northern Rakhine State, detailing the violence suffered by the Rohingya refugees, refraining from use of the term “ethnic cleansing.” In April 2018, the State Department issued a statement, announcing an additional $50 million and a total of $255 million since FY 2017 to be spent on humanitarian aid for Rohingya refugees. The statement also noted this contribution was impacted by the support of Congressional lawmakers.

By the mid 2019, the United States has imposed sanctions on senior officials of the Myanmar military that prevents those officials from crossing US border. The military strongly condemned those measures. At the end of 2019, when the West African Nation Gambia filed a case at the International Court of Justice against Myanmar, accusing it of genocide, the US immediately tightened up sanctions against Myanmar Army chief, Min Aung Hlaing, freezing his US assets.

On January 31, 2020, the Trump administration restricted immigration from 6 countries and Myanmar was among them.

=== Second Trump administration ===
The United States threatened to impose a 40% tariff in July 2025 after imposing travel restrictions on Myanmar in June of that same year. When Douglas Sonnek took over as Chargé d'Affaires ad interim at the U.S. Embassy in Yangon on January 15, 2026, diplomatic changes persisted into early 2026.

Due to the military regime's ongoing threat to American foreign policy and national security, U.S. President Donald Trump extended Executive Order 14014 by one year on February 3, 2026. At the same time, the Consolidated Appropriations Act for Fiscal Year 2026 was signed, authorizing $121,000,000 in non-lethal, humanitarian, and cross-border aid under the BURMA Act.

== Recent relations ==
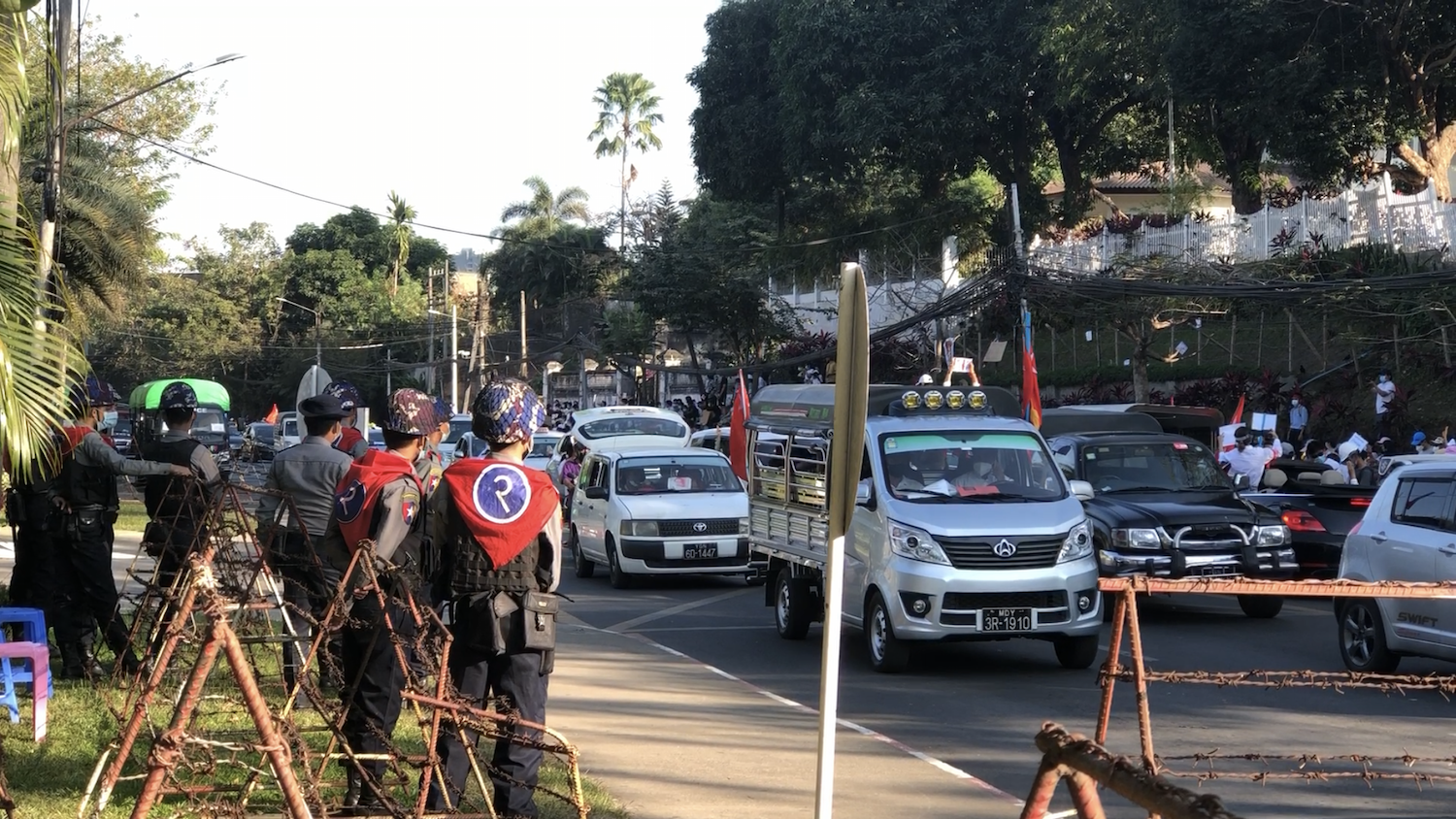
Police in front of US Embassy Yangon during the 2021 Protests

In February 2021, State Counsellor Aung San Suu Kyi was overthrown in a military coup led by Min Aung Hlaing. The United States condemned the coup and threatened to impose sanctions. They later followed through on the threat on February 10, when President Joe Biden announced sanctions on Myanmar military leaders and their business associates.

In August 2021, as the protests escalated into greater conflict, two Myanmar citizens in the United States were arrested over an alleged plot to hire hitmen to assassinate Kyaw Moe Tun, Myanmar's representative to the United Nations in New York. Kyaw Moe Tun had defied the military coup publicly at the UN earlier in 2021 continuing to represent the ousted government.

On March 21, 2022, the United States formally recognized the Rohingya genocide in a decision announced by Antony Blinken.

On July 23, 2022, the State Administration Council junta of Myanmar executed four political prisoners, marking the first time the death penalty had been carried out in Myanmar since the late 1980s. The G7 nations, including the United States, issued a joint statement condemning the executions for its disregard of human rights and the rule of law. The State Department further pressed China to influence the situation stating that "it cannot be business as usual with the junta."

In November 2022, the United States and the European Union announced further sanctions on individuals and companies connected with atrocities in Myanmar's war targeting military junta officials, arms dealers and their associated companies. One arms company targeted was Sky Aviator Company and its owner Kyaw Min Oo, who the State department assessed as a key supplier of military aircraft parts to the junta's lethal air strikes against civilians and political opposition.

In December 2022, The BURMA Act was passed in Congress authorising sanctions on individuals involved in the coup d'état, providing support to civil society and humanitarian assistance as well as creating a position within the State Department dedicated to democracy in Burma.

On October 26, 2023, at the State Administration Council meeting, General Min Aung Hlaing blamed the US for its containment policy against China and provoking unrest in Myanmar.

On October 31, 2023, the U.S. Department of the Treasury's Office of Foreign Assets Control (OFAC) imposed sanctions on Myanmar's state-owned Myanma Oil and Gas Enterprise (MOGE), responsible for oil and gas extraction, production, and distribution, and generating significant revenue for the military regime. The sanction also targeted the regime's five top officials: Charlie Than, Kan Zaw, Swe Swe Aung, Zaw Min, and General Maung Maung Aye.

On June 4, 2025, U.S. President Donald Trump signed a proclamation implementing a travel ban for all Myanmar citizens for national security concerns.

On 7 July 2025, Donald Trump sent a letter addressed to SAC Chairman Min Aung Hlaing stating that Myanmar's exports would be subject to a 40% tariff.

On 24 July 2025, the US Department of the Treasury lifted sanctions on SAC-affiliated companies such as the MCM group; American officials declined to comment on the exact reason, but denied any connections of Min Aung Hlaing praise of Trump in his response letter on July 9th. A sanctions law firm, Ferrari and Associates, confirmed that one company and two individuals were their clients. Additionally, the Trump Administration is reportedly considering enacting a US-mediated ceasefire between the military junta and the Kachin Independence Army in exchange for rare earth metals.

Chargé d’Affaires, Susan N. Stevenson, visited Myitkyina, Kachin State, from August 11–13, 2025. An embassy spokesperson denied that she met with SSPC or KIA officials.

The SSPC hired the McKeon Group lobbying firm to "[develop] diplomatic relationships between the Embassy and the US Government."

On November 24, 2025, The United States Department of Homeland Security (DHS) announced that as of January 2026, it will end the Temporary Protected Status (TPS) designation for nationals of Myanmar. According to Kristi Noem, the junta "made notable progress in governance and stability, including the end of its state of emergency, plans for free and fair elections, successful ceasefire agreements, and improved local governance contributing to enhanced public service delivery and national reconciliation.”

The Myanmar Navy under the SSPC participated in the 2nd ASEAN-US Maritime Exercise (AUMX) from December 9th-13th, 2025. They engaged in tactical maneuver drills and MEDEVAC exercises. As the exercise was hosted by ASEAN, the presence of the Myanmar Navy did not violate any prohibitions against direct military cooperation with the junta.

On 3 February 2026, U.S. President Donald Trump renewed sanctions against the Myanmar military by extending Executive Order 14014 by 1 year. Simultaneously, he signed the Consolidated Appropriations Act that included a clause authorizing $121,000,000 for humanitarian programs and non-lethal aid under the BURMA Act.

On September 16, 2026, a delegation of American officials secured the release of former security consultant, Adam Castillo, after a week of negotiations. Tatmadaw authorities detained Castillo over an alleged business dispute. State-run MRTV declared the release was "in consideration of the friendly relations between Myanmar and the United States."

The United States government and the SSPC reportedly started negotiations on 7-8 October 2026 in Tokyo, Japan. Assistant Secretary of State for Intelligence and Research, Michael Vance, led the talks. Although the exact details of the meeting are unknown, the Office of Foreign Assets Control removed sanctions on Theint Win Htet, the daughter of Thein Win Zaw. She initially filed a complaint in July before being removed on 9 October.

According to a State Department Integrated Country Strategy report on Myanmar dated 31 August 2026, the US diplomatic mission intends to mediate a ceasefire for a "lasting peace agreement by 2030" and hold forums that "[advance] fiscal federalism and territorial demarcation [to] create opportunities to access... bountiful rare earth resources."

== Covert military activities in Myanmar ==
On September 10, 2007, the Burmese Government accused the CIA of assassinating a rebel Karen commander from the KNU who wanted to negotiate with the military government.

According to media reports citing documents published by Germany's Der Spiegel in 2010, the Embassy of the United States in Yangon is the site of an electronic surveillance facility used to monitor telephones and communications networks, run jointly by the Central Intelligence Agency and National Security Agency group known as Special Collection Service.

== U.S. support for Myanmar civil society ==
According to WikiLeaks cables, the United States funded some of the civil society groups in Myanmar that forced the government to suspend a controversial Chinese Myitsone Dam on the Irrawaddy River.

== Diplomatic missions ==
The US embassy in Myanmar is located in Yangon, whilst the Burmese diplomatic representation to the United States is based in Washington, D.C.

=== Major Officials of the US Embassy in Yangon ===
- Chargé d'Affaires – Douglas Sonnek
