= 93rd Regiment =

93rd Regiment may refer to:

- 93rd Regiment of Foot (disambiguation), British Army regiments
- 93rd Infantry Regiment (PA)
- 93rd Burma Infantry
- 93rd Engineer General Service Regiment
- 93rd Searchlight Regiment
- 93rd Light Anti-Aircraft Regiment, Royal Artillery
- 93rd Heavy Anti-Aircraft Regiment, Royal Artillery
- 93rd Reserve Infantry Regiment

== American Civil War regiments ==
- 93rd Illinois Infantry Regiment
- 93rd Indiana Infantry Regiment
- 93rd New York Infantry Regiment
- 93rd Ohio Infantry Regiment
- 93rd Pennsylvania Infantry Regiment

== See also ==
- 93rd Highland Regiment F.C., a football club
- 93rd Brigade (disambiguation)
- 93rd Division (disambiguation)
