= 93rd Rifle Division =

93rd Rifle Division may refer to the following units of the Soviet Union:

- 93rd Guards Rifle Division, later the 93rd Guards Motor Rifle Division
- 93rd Motor Rifle Division
- 93rd Rifle Division (1936–1942)
- 93rd Rifle Division (1942–1946)

== See also ==
- 93rd Division (disambiguation)
