= 93rd =

93rd is the ordinal form of the number 93. 93rd or Ninety-third may also refer to:

- A fraction, 1/93, equal to one of 93 equal parts

== Geography ==
- 93rd meridian east, a line of longitude
- 93rd meridian west, a line of longitude
- 93rd Street

== Military ==
- 93rd Brigade (disambiguation)
- 93rd Division (disambiguation)
- 93rd Regiment (disambiguation)

== Other ==
- 93rd century
- 93rd century BC

== See also ==
- 93 (disambiguation)
- April 3, 93rd day of the year in a standard year
