= Border Campaign =

Border Campaign may refer to:

- Pancho Villa Expedition, a 1916–17 U.S. operation in Mexico
- Border campaign (Irish Republican Army) or Operation Harvest, a 1956–62 guerrilla war in Northern Ireland
- 1960–61 campaign at the China–Burma border, after the Chinese Civil War
