= Vorya =

Vorya may refer to:

- Vorya (Klyazma), a river in Russia, tributary of the Klyazma
- Vorya (Ugra), a river in Russia, tributary of the Ugra
