= Republic of China in the Vietnam War =

The Republic of China (ROC), commonly known as Nationalist China or Taiwan, supported the Republic of Vietnam (RVN; South Vietnam) during the Vietnam War. Both were anti-communist Asian nations fighting against rival communist regimes, the People's Republic of China (PRC; mainland China) and Democratic Republic of Vietnam (DRV; North Vietnam).

== History ==
ROC military involvement in South Vietnam began on 8 October 1964 with the arrival of political warfare advisors, forming the Republic of China Military Assistance Advisory Group (ROC MAAG) Vietnam. The mission also included technical and medical personnel. In 1966, the Republic of China Navy provided two Landing Ship Tanks (LST) and crews to assist South Vietnam, which operated under the American flag. Also during that year, there was a suggestion by General Westmoreland and the U.S. Military Assistance Command, Vietnam, that a Republic of China Marine Corps brigade be deployed as combat troops, but this was not accepted for political reasons.

From November 1967, the ROC secretly operated a cargo transport detachment to assist the US and the RVN. It was based on existing formation of the 34th squadron of ROC Air force. The unit's strength included two cargo aircraft, seven flight officers and two mechanics, even though a higher number of military personnel was involved through rotation. It was tasked with air transportation, airdrop and electronic reconnaissance. Some 25 members of the unit were killed, among them 17 pilots and co-pilots, and three aircraft were lost. Other ROC involvement in Vietnam included a secret listening station, special reconnaissance and raiding squads, military advisers and civilian airline operations (which cost a further two aircraft due to Vietnamese individually operated AA missiles).

The ROC also provided military training units for the South Vietnamese diving units. The ROC trained units would eventually become the Lien Doi Nguoi Nhai (LDMN) or Frogman unit in English. In addition to the diving trainers there were several hundred military personnel. Military commandos from the ROC were captured by communist forces three times, on 16 July 1961, July 1963 and again on 23 October 1963, trying to infiltrate North Vietnam.17 commandos were made prisoners during this time.

== R&R ==
The island of Taiwan was a popular R&R location for US military service members.

== See also ==
- Chinese occupation of northern Vietnam, 1945–1946
- Taiwanese Army on Phú Quốc Island
- Kuomintang in Burma
- Taiwan–Vietnam relations#Relationship with South Vietnam
- Communist China in the Vietnam War

== Bibliography ==
- Conboy, Ken & Morrison, James (November–December 1999). "Plausible Deniability: US-Taiwanese Covert Insertions into North Vietnam". Air Enthusiast (84): 29–34. ISSN 0143-5450.
- Larsen, Stanley Robert; Collins Jr., James Lawton (1985) [1975]. "The Republic of China". Allied Participation in Vietnam. Washington, D.C.: Department of the Army. LCCN 74-28217.
- Moïse, Edwin E. (1996). Tonkin Gulf and the Escalation of the Vietnam War. Chapel Hill: University of North Carolina Press. ISBN 0-8078-2300-7.
