= Southwestern China =

Geographical region of China

- Region
- Government-defined region of Southwest China. Red: controlled by China; light red: disputed territory
- Country: China
- Largest city: Chongqing

Area
  - Total: 2,365,900 km^{2} (913,500 sq mi)

Population
  - Total: 192,979,243
  - Density: 82/km^{2} (210/sq mi)
- GDP: 2022
- Total: ¥13.713 trillion $2.039 trillion
- Per Capita: ¥71,060 $10,565

Southwestern China (Chinese: 西南; pinyin: Xīnán) is a region in the People's Republic of China. It consists of five provincial administrative regions, namely Chongqing, Sichuan, Guizhou, Yunnan, and Tibet.

== Geography ==
Southwestern China is a rugged and mountainous region, transitioning between the Tibetan Plateau to the west and the Chinese coastal hills (东南丘陵) and plains to the east. Key geographic features in the region include the Hengduan Mountains in the west, the Sichuan Basin in the northeast, and the karstic Yungui Plateau in the east. The majority of the region is drained by the Yangtze River, which forms the Three Gorges in the northeast of the region.

The narrowest concept of Southwestern China consists of Sichuan, Chongqing, Yunnan, and Guizhou, while wider definitions often include Guangxi and western portions of Hunan. The official government definition of Southwestern China includes the core provinces of Sichuan, Chongqing, Yunnan, and Guizhou, in addition to the Tibet Autonomous Region.

== History ==
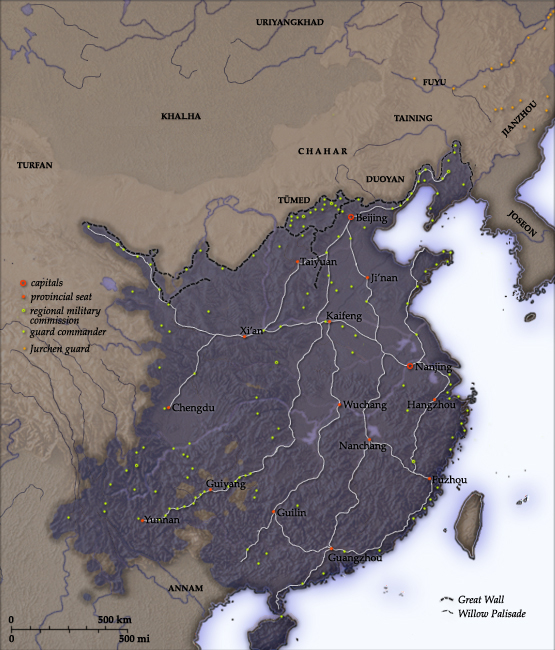
Map of Ming Dynasty China in 1580. Ming Southwestern China was anchored by the cities of Chengdu, Kunming, and Guiyang (bottom left).

Portions of Southwestern China, including the land that is modern day Yunnan, Guizhou, and Sichuan, were incorporated into China in 230 BCE by Qin dynasty emperor Shi Huangdi. Independent states would continue to exert influence within the region, with notable examples being the Nanzhao Kingdom in the 8th and 9th centuries CE and the Dali Kingdom in 10th and 11th centuries CE. The region was largely pacified and incorporated into the Ming domain. In the 13th century CE, the Mongol led Yuan dynasty expanded its frontiers to include the Tibetan Plateau, which now defines China's current southwest frontier.

In the 18th century CE, control of the Tibetan Plateau area was important in the Great Game confrontations between the imperial powers of Russia, Britain, and China.

After the warlord governments of China's Republican era replaced the Manchu led Qing dynasty, government policy towards the southwest largely became one of inaction.

The Second Sino-Japanese War prompted the Nationalist government to focus increasingly on state-building tasks in the southwest. The city of Chongqing served as the capital of Chinese resistance to imperial Japanese expansion.

After their defeat in the Chinese Civil War, parts of the Nationalist army retreated south and crossed the border into Burma as the People's Liberation Army entered Yunnan. The United States supported these Nationalist forces because the United States hoped they would harass the People's Republic of China from the southwest, thereby diverting Chinese resources from the Korean War. The Burmese government protested and international pressure increased. Beginning in 1953, several rounds of withdrawals of the Nationalist forces and their families were carried out. In 1960, joint military action by China and Burma expelled the remaining Nationalist forces from Burma, although some went on to settle in the Burma-Thailand borderlands.

Western strategies to contain China in the 20th century CE included intervention in the Tibetan Plateau until almost the mid-1970s. Tibet became an increased area of concern in China's southwest after the Sino-Soviet split when Soviet soldiers on the border of Mongolia and China threatened to close the Gansu corridor, which would have left Tibet as the only reliable Chinese route to Xinjiang.

During the reform and opening up era, China began to look more seriously towards integrating its southwest regions. China's increased focus on trade-led development and its transition to a socialist market economy helped trigger a reorientation to the southwest as its lagging development became increasingly seen as an impediment to growth. China's southwest development initiatives reflect an awareness that economic engagement is the most cost-effective way to decrease political unrest and remedy underdevelopment along this frontier.

== Demographics ==
The diverse areas of Southwestern China carry strong regional identities and have been historically considered more rural than the more developed eastern regions of China. Rapid development since the late 1970s has helped transform many parts of the region with modern advancements. In the early 21st century, Southwestern China contained 50% of the country's ethnic minority population which, in turn, formed 37% of the region's population. Han Chinese migration has been largely concentrated in the urban centres, while the rural areas are still predominantly made up of minority populations, including the Zhuang, Miao, Yi, and others.

Inhabitants of Southwestern China primarily speak a dialect of Mandarin Chinese known as Southwestern Mandarin. This variant uses the same written language as Mandarin but is only approximately 50% mutually intelligible with Standard Chinese. As of 2012, there were approximately 260 million speakers of Southwestern Mandarin.

== Industry ==
In the first half of the 20th century, industrial development in China's southwest was state-led.

== Administrative divisions ==
GB	ISO No.	Province	Chinese Name	Capital	Population	Density	Area	Abbreviation/Symbol	
Yú	50	Chongqing Municipality	重庆市; Chóngqìng Shì	Chongqing	28,846,170	350.50	82,300	CQ	渝
Chuān (Shǔ)	51	Sichuan Province	四川省; Sìchuān Shěng	Chengdu	80,418,200	165.81	485,000	SC	川(蜀)
Guì (Qián)	52	Guizhou Province	贵州省; Gùizhōu Shěng	Guiyang	34,746,468	197.42	176,000	GZ	贵(黔)
Yún (Diān)	53	Yunnan Province	云南省; Yúnnán Shěng	Kunming	45,966,239	116.67	394,000	YN	云(滇)
Zàng	54	Tibet Autonomous Region	西藏自治区; Xīzàng Zìzhìqū	Lhasa	3,002,166	2.44	1,228,400	XZ	藏

== Cities with urban area over one million in population ==
#	City	Urban area	District area	City proper	Prov.	Census date
1	Chongqing (Note: Chongqing core area only, satellite urban area separated from Chongqing core area is not included.)	8,894,757	12,084,385	16,044,027	CQ	2010-11-01
2	Chengdu	6,316,922	7,415,590	14,047,625	SC	2010-11-01
3	Kunming (Note: Dongchuan is a satellite urban area separated from Kunming and it is not included.)	3,140,777	3,272,586	6,432,209	YN	2010-11-01
4	Guiyang	2,520,061	3,034,750	4,322,611	GZ	2010-11-01
