= 93 =

93 may refer to:

- 93 (number), the natural number following 92 and preceding 94
- one of the years 93 BC, AD 93, 1993, 2093, etc.
- 93 Seine-Saint-Denis, French department, Paris, Île-de-France
- Atomic number 93: neptunium
- Ninety-Three, English title of Quatrevingt-treize (same meaning), a novel by the French writer Victor Hugo
- Ninety-three (horse), a racehorse
- Saab 93, a small family car
- United Airlines Flight 93, hijacked on September 11, 2001
- "93", a song by 6ix9ine from Day69
- 93 Minerva, a main-belt asteroid
- Tatra 93, a 6x6 version of the Tatra 92

== See also ==
- 93rd (disambiguation)
- List of highways numbered 93
