= 93rd Regiment of Foot (disambiguation) =

Four regiments of the British Army have been numbered the 93rd Regiment of Foot:

- 93rd Regiment of Foot (1760), raised in 1760
- 93rd Regiment of Foot (1780), raised in 1780
- 93rd Regiment of Foot (1793), raised in 1793
- 93rd (Sutherland Highlanders) Regiment of Foot, raised in 1799
