= 93rd Regiment of Foot (1780) =

- Active: 1780–1783
- Country: Kingdom of Great Britain (1707–1800)
- Branch: British Army
- Type: Infantry

Commanders
- Colonel of the Regiment: Col. William McCormick

The 93rd Regiment of Foot was a short-lived infantry regiment in the British Army which was raised in 1780 to provide garrison troops for the West Indies during the American Revolutionary War.

The colonel-commandant of the regiment was Colonel William McCormick.

After several years stationed in Jamaica the regiment was disbanded in England after the Treaty of Paris in 1783.
