= Kuomintang in Burma =

Chinese Nationalist troops that fled to Burma in 1950

Yunnan Anti-Communist National Salvation Army
- 雲南反共救國軍
- Flag of the National Revolutionary Army and later the Republic of China Army
- Active: 1949–1961
- Disbanded: 30 May 1954 (officially)
- Countries: Republic of China Burma Thailand
- Allegiance: Republic of China; Kuomintang
- Branch: Republic of China Army (until 1954)
- Type: Infantry
- Role: Irregular guerilla warfare
- Size: Roughly 12,000-26,000 (peak)
- Garrison/HQ: Kengtung (1949–1950); Mong Hsat (1950–1961); Chiang Rai (1961)
- Nicknames: Thailand-Burma orphaned army Northern Thailand orphaned army
- Engagements: 1960–1961 campaign at the China–Burma border, Communist insurgency in Thailand

Commanders
- Lt. General: Li Mi
- M. General: Liu Kuo-chuan
- M. General: Mah Chaw Yu

Insignia
- Emblem of the Republic of China Army

- Identification symbol

Kuomintang in Burma
- Traditional Chinese: 泰緬孤軍
- Literal meaning: Thailand–Burma orphaned army
Transcriptions
Standard Mandarin
- Hanyu Pinyin: Tàimiǎn gū jūn
- Wade–Giles: Tʻai4-Mien3 Ku1-chün1

Alternative Chinese name
- Traditional Chinese: 泰北孤軍
- Literal meaning: Northern Thailand orphaned army
Transcriptions
Standard Mandarin
- Hanyu Pinyin: Tàiběi gū jūn
- Wade–Giles: Tʻai4-pei3 Ku1-chün1

Second alternative Chinese name
- Traditional Chinese: 雲南反共救國軍
- Literal meaning: Yunnan Anti-Communist National Salvation Army
Transcriptions
Standard Mandarin
- Hanyu Pinyin: Yúnnán fǎngòng jiùguó jūn
- Wade–Giles: Yün2-nan3 Fan3-kung4 Chiu4-kuo2 Chün1

The Kuomintang in Burma, also known as the Thai-Burmese Lone Army (Chinese: 泰緬孤軍; pinyin: Tàimiǎn gū jūn; Wade–Giles: T‘ai^{4}-mien^{3} ku^{1} chün^{1}) or Kuomintang in the Golden Triangle, which was officially known as the Yunnan Anti-Communist National Salvation Army (Chinese: 雲南反共救國軍; pinyin: Yúnnán fǎngòng jiùguó jūn; Wade–Giles: Yün^{2}-nan^{3} Fan^{3}-kung^{4} Chiu^{4}-kuo^{2} Chün^{1}) were troops of the Republic of China Army loyal to the Kuomintang (KMT) that fled from China to Burma in 1950 after their defeat by the Chinese communists in the Chinese Civil War. They were commanded by Lieutenant-General Li Mi and, over the course of their existence, attempted several incursions into Yunnan in the early 1950s, only to be pushed back into Burma each time by the People's Liberation Army.

The entire campaign, with logistical support from the Republic of China which had retreated to Taiwan, the United States, and Thailand, was controversial from the start, as it weakened Burmese sovereignty and introduced the KMT's involvement in the region's lucrative opium trade. In 1953, the frustrated Burmese government appealed to the United Nations and put international pressure on the Republic of China to withdraw its troops to Taiwan the following year. As a result, the United States initiated a Four-Nation Military Commission (Burma, the United States, the Republic of China, and Thailand) to negotiate the KMT withdrawal. On 30 May 1954, General Li Mi announced the dissolution of the Yunnan Province Anti-Communist National Rescue Army. However, 6,000 irregular KMT troops remained in Burma. Fighting continued sporadically from the irregular troops until coordinated military operations from 1960 to 1961 between the PRC and Burmese governments expelled the remaining irregular KMT troops from Burma. Though most were evacuated to Taiwan, some remained in Burma or formed communities in Thailand.

== Before KMT invasion ==
Various internal conflicts broke out in Burma after the country gained independence from British colonial rule in 1948; as noted by historian Martin Smith, "the dilemmas of national unity and traditions of armed struggle date back to the colonial era, and they have found new expression in every political era since independence." After Burma fell under colonial rule as a consequence of the Anglo-Burmese Wars, Britain administered the region as a province of British India as opposed to an independent entity. While the Burman majority in Central Burma were under direct British control, ethnic minorities in the border regions were placed under indirect rule by Britain.

The 1947 Burma Constitution retained the colonial federal arrangement between the central government and the peripheral states: Shan and Karenni sawbwas were granted a status similar to that of the rulers of the princely Indian states, with autonomy over administration and law enforcement. On top of that, the Shan and Karenni States also had the extraordinary right of secession after ten years in the Union. In contrast, the Kachin, Chin and Karen remained under central administration, while the Mon and Arakanese did not even have any separate political representation.

The ethnic Burman majority in the central plains were also split by political ideology. Like the Communist parties in Vietnam and Malaya, the Communist Party of Burma (CPB) acquired a high degree of organizational strength and popularity from its anti-Japanese efforts. Furthermore, the People's Volunteer Organization (PVO), the former private army of the nationalist leader Aung San, split between socialist and communist sympathizers, and the latter went underground to join the Communists. This was followed by a series of mutinies in the Union Military Police and the Burmese army. With the inner circle of competent leaders murdered, and army units mutinied along ethnic and ideological lines, the civil war started within a year of independence as the ethnic insurgents (the Karen, Mon and Karenni) as well as the Communists resorted to arms against the government.

Gradually, the Burmese Army (Tatmadaw) strengthened and managed to eliminate almost all pockets of resistance. By 1950, many insurgents surrendered to the government during periods of amnesty. The success of the Burmese Army was due largely to its advantage over the rebels in arms and discipline. While the insurgents had superiority in numbers, they were unable to coordinate their activities because of their divergent goals and ideologies. Just when the Burmese government thought it had achieved some measure of political stability and could focus on the urgent task of nation building, the KMT threat arrived on its northeastern borders.

== KMT offensive ==
Map of the Kuomintang incursion in Burma, 1950 – 1953

When the Communist People's Liberation Army (PLA) entered Yunnan Province in December 1949, the KMT troops and their dependents began crossing into Burma in late December 1949 and early January 1950. Those KMT troops were members of the Eighth Army commanded by Lieutenant-General Li Mi, the 26th Army under Major-General Liu Kuo-chuan and the 93rd Division under Major-General Mah Chaw Yu. They settled in Kengtung—one of the Shan states near the Thai-Burma border—at the village of Tachilek. [see Young; Taylor; McCoy] General Li Mi took command of the KMT army in Burma and it grew steadily over the next few years as more stragglers made their way across the border and the army recruited from the local population. By March 1950, there were around 1,500 KMT troops occupying territory between Kengtung City and Tachilek. By April 1951 that number grew to more than 4,000 and by year-end it rose to 6,000. It would then double in 1952.

In June 1950, the Burmese government demanded that the KMT either surrender or leave Burma immediately. The KMT field commander who received the Burmese request not only refused to comply but declared that the KMT troops had no intention of either surrendering or leaving the area, and would retaliate with force if the Burmese Army initiated military action. In response, the Burmese Army launched a drive from Kengtung City and captured Tachilek within weeks. Forced out of Tachilek, the KMT established a new base camp at Mong Hsat in July 1950. Mong Hsat was the second largest town in the state of Kengtung and was ideally situated for the KMT. It was centrally located in a fertile basin endowed with approximately sixty square miles of rice cultivation area, and it was surrounded by hilly terrain on all sides that acted as natural defense barriers. The town was only eighty miles from the Thailand border and hence supplies could be easily obtained from outside Burma through Thailand. The Burmese Army made several attempts over the next two years but were unsuccessful in ousting the KMT from Mong Hsat.

The main reason for KMT's intransigence was its intention to use Burma as a refuge to reorganize, train, and equip themselves for the purpose of launching an invasion to retake mainland China. Under the command of General Li Mi, an offensive was launched into Yunnan Province in May 1951 involving around 20,000 men. KMT troops moved northward and captured Kengma and its airfield some sixty miles inside China without resistance. However, as they advanced further north, the 40,000-strong People's Liberation Army counterattacked. Li Mi's army suffered huge losses and retreated back to Burma, after less than a month in China. The KMT made two more abortive attempts in July 1951 and August 1952 that took heavy casualties, after which they never invaded Yunnan again and instead "settled along the border to gather intelligence and monitor signs of a possible Communist Chinese advance into Southeast Asia."

== CIA assistance and opium trade ==
The United States supported the KMT army, which strained the Burma-United States relationship and raised protests from the Burmese government. The United States was motivated by fears of Southeast Asia's fall to communism, a disastrous possibility that would entail the endangerment of the Pacific perimeter and alleviate the People's Republic's food insecurity. The United States thus hoped that the KMT forces would harass southwest China and divert Chinese resources from the Korean War.

The KMT army in Burma could not have expanded as it did without the logistical support from the United States, Thailand and Taiwan, as well as the financial support derived from the KMT's involvement in the region's opium trade. The United States Central Intelligence Agency (CIA) was the primary agency in charge of the covert program called "Operation Paper" that transported weapons and supplies to the KMT from Taiwan via Thailand. The plan received President Truman's approval and support from Thailand's Prime Minister Plaek Phibunsongkhram, but it notably excluded the US State Department who actively worked to defuse a situation it was unaware that elements of its government had created. American involvement in Operation Paper was revealed in late 1951 due to a miscommunication between the Thai and British governments, the former having believed the British had been privy to the operation. This diplomatic entanglement culminated in US Ambassador to Burma, David McKey's resignation.

The CIA put together a secret air supply network that shipped weapons and supplies to General Li Mi's forces in Mong Hsat from Thailand. The first shipments started in early 1951, when unmarked C-46 and C-47 aircraft were making at least five parachute drops a week. By late 1951, the KMT repaired the old airstrip at Mong Hsat constructed by the Allied forces during World War II. The enlarged airstrip could handle large four-engine aircraft and allowed the KMT troops to obtain newly manufactured American weapons from Taiwan. CIA advisers also accompanied the KMT army in the Yunnan invasion in May 1951, and some of them were killed during the offensive.

When KMT guerillas retreated into Kokang, the Burmese government obtained the assistance of Olive Yang and the Kokang Kakweye to force the Kuomintang forces out of Kokang. Yang and the Kokang Kakweye succeeded in 1953, but then collaborated with the Kuomintang in trafficking opium to Thailand throughout the 1950s; the Kuomintang continued to use these opium routes for decades.

== KMT entrenchment and attempted colonization ==
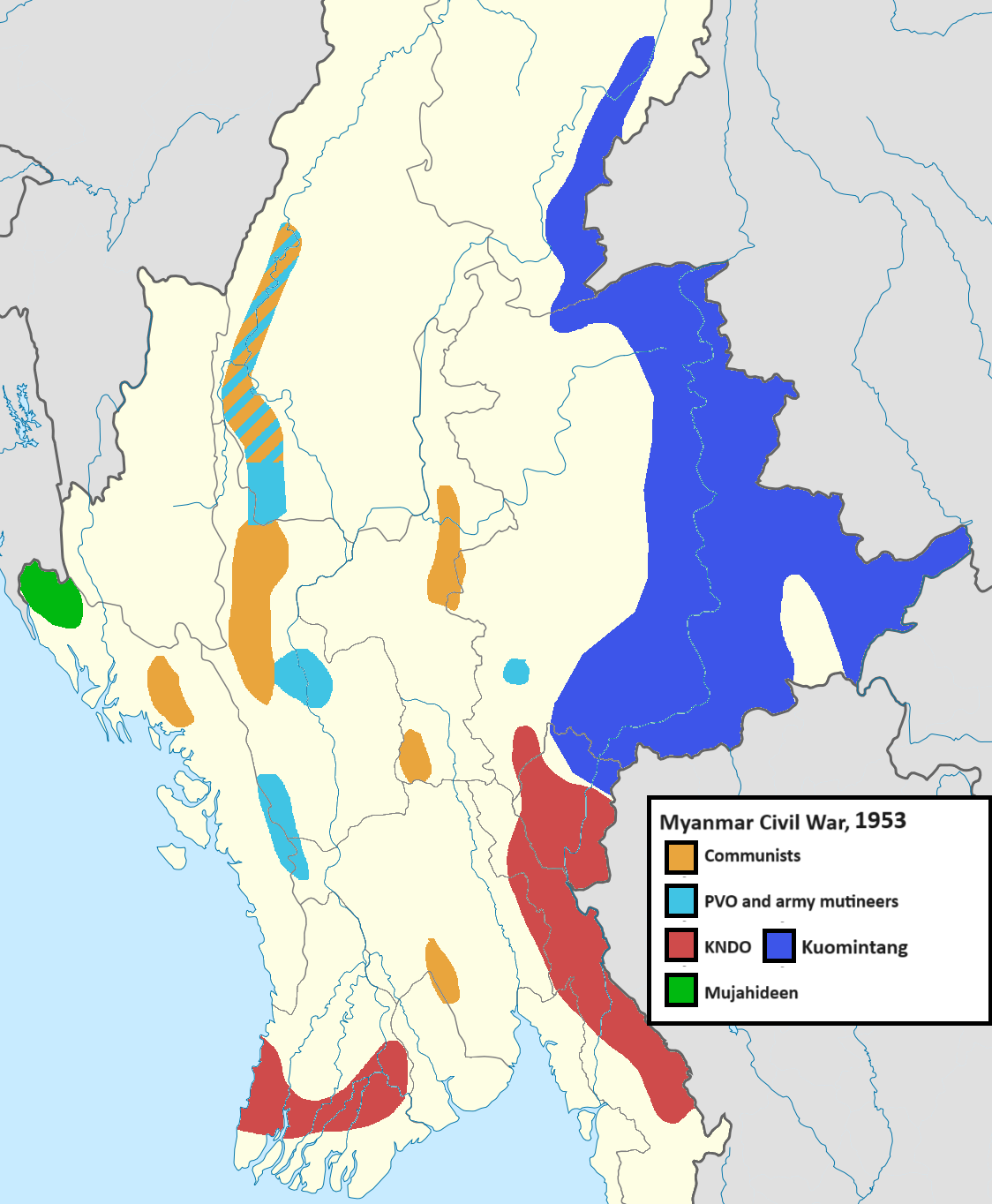
Map of civil war in Burma in 1953

Following their failed attempt to re-enter China in August 1952, the KMT appeared to change its policy of using Burma as a base of operations for the invasion of Communist China to permanent entrenchment in the Shan area. The KMT stopped concentrating their forces near the China border in late 1952 and spread out across the Shan states as well as parts of the Kachin State. Eventually it gained control over the Shan territories between the Salween River on the west, the China border on the east, and Thailand on the south. The KMT army removed all Burmese government officials and became the only effective yet harsh government that ruled over the population of one million. It began a policy of press-ganging local Shan, Wa, and Lahu villagers, growing 12,000 strong.

The KMT-controlled territories made up Burma's major opium-producing region, and the shift in KMT policy allowed them to expand their control over the region's opium trade. Furthermore, Communist China's forced eradication of illicit opium cultivation in Yunnan by the early 1950s effectively handed the opium monopoly to the KMT army in the Shan states. Prior to the arrival of the KMT, the opium trade had already developed as a component of the local economy during the British colonial era. The main consumers of the drug were the local ethnic Chinese and those across the border in Yunnan and the rest of Southeast Asia. The KMT coerced the local villagers for recruits, food and money, and exacted a heavy tax on the opium farmers. This forced the farmers to increase their production to make ends meet. One American missionary to the Lahu tribesmen of Kengtung State even testifies to the torture the KMT committed to the Lahu for failing to comply with their regulations. The annual production increased twenty-fold from 30 tons at the time of Burmese independence to 600 tons in the mid-1950s.

The KMT troops were, in effect, the forebears of the private narcotic armies operating in the Golden Triangle. Almost all the KMT opium was sent south to Thailand. The trade between the KMT and their Thai allies worked such that weapons and military supplies were brought in to Mong Hsat on the incoming trip (either by mule train or aircraft) and KMT opium transported south to Chiang Mai on the outgoing trip. The KMT usually dealt with a powerful Thai police commander and client of the CIA, General Phao Sriyanond, who shipped the opium from Chiang Mai to Bangkok for both local consumption and export.

== Burmese anxieties ==
The intrusion of KMT troops into Burma posed serious problems of internal and external security for the newly independent country. Internally, the KMT's overtures to the local insurgents exacerbated the existing civil conflict between the Burmese government and the ethnic and Communist insurgents. Starting in late 1951, the KMT made contacts and formed a loose alliance with the Karen National Defense Organization (KNDO), the largest of the still active indigenous insurgent groups. A combination of factors made the KMT-KNDO alliance useful for both groups. Both were aligned in their disagreement with the neutralist foreign policy of Burma and both looked to the West for aid. While the KMT had modern weapons and other military supplies, the KNDO had contacts, local knowledge, and easier access to food supplies. To make matters worse for the government, some of the American-manufactured weapons also made their way (apparently through KNDO) into the hands of the Burmese communist rebels. The net effect of KMT's intrusion into the Burmese civil conflict was that it distracted the Burmese Army from its counter-insurgency efforts and increased the quantity of weapons available to the anti-government rebels.

Externally, the existence of anti-communist KMT troops on its borders with China compromised Burma's neutralist foreign policy. As different groups within Burma desired to support one or the other bloc in the Cold War, it was in the government's interests to follow a neutralist policy in order to avoid antagonizing either the pro-Western minorities or the pro-Soviet or pro-Chinese communists. On the other hand, Burma was located between neutral India to the west, Communist China to the north, and war-torn Laos and pro-West Thailand to the east. Situated in the middle of these states with differing ideologies and deep antagonisms, this made it necessary for Burma to maintain friendly terms with all of them.

The Burmese government feared that the presence of the anti-communist KMT troops on its borders would antagonize Communist China and provide it with an excuse to invade Burma. Indeed, at a time when the Korean War that involved the United States and China was ongoing, such a fear was not unfounded. On its part, Communist China was concerned that the United States might open a second front in its southern provinces by using Burma as a base of operations and the KMT troops as a nucleus for an invasion army. Indeed, China's policies in the early 1950s justified Burma's anxieties. First, Communist China's promulgation and subsequent creation of an autonomous state for the Chinese Shans was an apparent attempt to foster separatist tendencies of the Burmese Shans and attract them to China. Second, since its victory in the Chinese civil war, Communist China had been giving advice and supplies to the Burmese Communists and allowed them to use Chinese territory as a military and political training center. Third, China displayed its belligerence in Yunnan Province by amassing an estimated 200,000 troops, as well as building and repairing roads that led to Burma. Finally, Communist China made claims on territories on the 1,500 mile Sino-Burmese border that both sides had yet to officially demarcate. Estimating that Communist China would need mere weeks and only 50,000 troops to occupy Northern Burma, the United States soon began seeking ways to de-escalate the situation. Fortunately, despite China's militancy, Burma's fears did not materialize as Beijing acted with restraint toward Burma during the entire KMT crisis period. In turn, Rangoon was careful to keep Beijing informed of the KMT issue.

== International pressure and KMT withdrawal ==
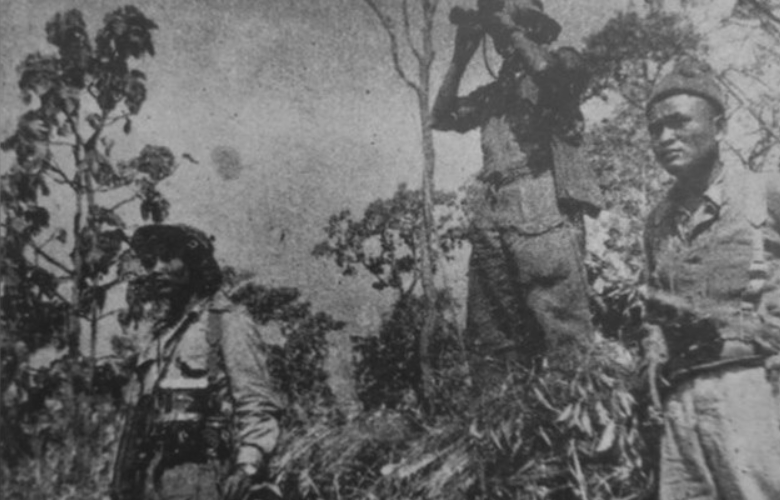
Burmese troops on the lookout for Kuomintang troops near the Sino–Burmese border, c. April 1954

After its military efforts and appeal to the United States failed to resolve the KMT problem, Burma submitted a formal complaint to the United Nations in March 1953, producing reams of photos, captured documents, and testimony convincing enough to win a vote of censure for China. By then the KMT issue had become "such a source of international embarrassment for the United States" that it initiated a Four-Nation Military Commission (Burma, the United States, the Republic of China, and Thailand) in Bangkok on 22 May to negotiate the KMT withdrawal.

After months of negotiations and recalcitrance from the KMT, the three-phase withdrawal finally took place on 7 November and continued into December 1953. The second and third phases were conducted the following year during the periods 14–28 February and 1–7 May, respectively. The KMT troops and their dependents crossed the Thai-Burmese border and were flown out from Chiang Rai to Taiwan. It was obvious that the KMT carried out its evacuation halfheartedly; Burmese observers at the staging areas frequently protested that the supposedly Chinese evacuees looked more like Shans or Lahus, and the weapons they carried were "rusting museum pieces" instead of the recently acquired American manufactures. On 30 May 1954, General Li Mi announced the dissolution of the Yunnan Province Anticommunist National Rescue Army. However, 6,000 irregular KMT troops remained in Burma. Fighting began again a month later, and continued sporadically for the next seven years.

With the assistance of PLA troops, the Burmese Army conducted a series of successful military operations in 1960–1961 that finally "broke the back" of the KMT irregulars. Furthermore, on 15 February 1961, the Burmese Army managed to down and capture a patrol plane that attempted to drop supplies on the KMT. That incident provided the Burmese government concrete evidence that Taiwan had been supplying the KMT guerillas with military supplies of American origin. The diplomatic crisis that ensued prompted the United States to exert strong pressure on Taiwan to evacuate its remaining troops from Burma. Between 31 March and 17 April 1961, Taiwan evacuated around 4,400 KMT guerillas and dependents. The rest, a handful about 450 to 700, either remained in Burma or fled to Thailand and Laos.

== Aftermath ==
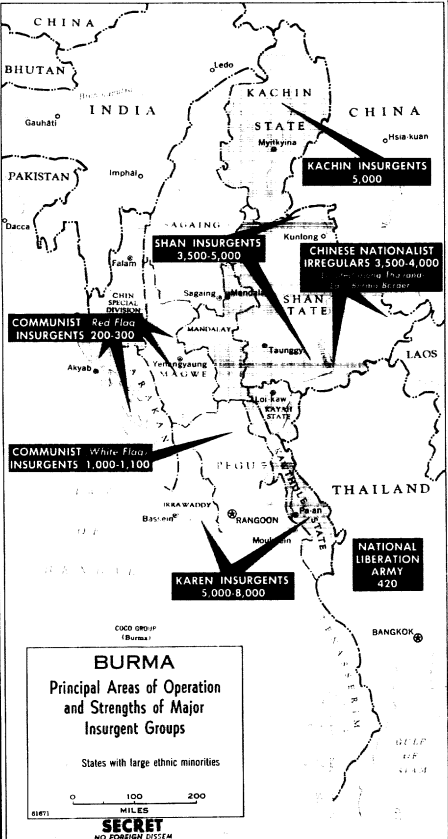
CIA map of insurgent activity in Burma in 1966, marking the continued presence of Kuomintang loyalists in the east

In general, scholars agree that the KMT crisis was an event of significant impact on Burma's history. The KMT intrusion into Burma had the unintended consequence of precipitating the nationalist sentiments into several ethnic insurrections led by the Shan, Wa and other ethnic groups. Initially the Shans were largely loyal to the newly independent Burmese government throughout the KMT crisis as they were a signatory to the historic Panglong Agreement that granted them secession rights. As such, Shan Elders (Sawbwas) refused KMT overtures for an alliance due to the active forces conscription of Shan men, the burning of Shan villages, and KMT monopolization of the opium trade. However, as the Burmese Army was increasingly deployed into Shan State to suppress the KMT presence, the Shans grew increasingly disaffected with Burmese rule. When it came to time for the Shans to deliberate on their status within the Union in 1958, the negative experience of the Army's repressive actions was an additional argument for greater autonomy. As a result, the Burmese Army led by Ne Win, determined to maintain the integrity of the Union, mounted a coup against the government and abrogated both the 1947 Constitution and the rights of the Shan and Karenni states to secede.

According to Mary Callahan (2003), the KMT crisis presented a formidable threat to Burma's sovereignty and proved to be a catalyst that forced the Burmese Army's institutionalization, turning it from a band of guerilla fighters into a professional army. Callahan argues that the Burmese Army's transformation gave it enormous autonomy and authority to define who were citizens and enemies in the ethnically diverse state. This transformation laid the foundation for its eventual consolidation of authority in the 1950s that culminated in its takeover of the government. Robert Taylor (1973) makes a similar argument about the significant consequences KMT intervention had on Burma's political, economic and ethnic problems. From 1952 to 1954, ~40% of the Burmese State's budget was consumed by the Burmese Army, leading to the failure of the government's ambitious economic development plans. The KMT army's involvement with the local rebels not only contributed to the Burmese state's failure to deal with the insurgencies, but also stunted Burmese efforts in national integration and economic construction.

Other scholars have been critical about the manner in which the United States handled the KMT issue. Kenneth Young's (1970) thesis highlights the Cold War context of the concurrent Korean War as well as the complicated foreign relations between Burma, Thailand, China (both Nationalist and Communist), and the United States. He argues that Operation Paper, the covert CIA program devised to aid the KMT troops in Burma, was a complete failure for the United States. Not only had the United States failed to contain Sino-Burmese relations, it had alienated Burma through its handling of the KMT issue and its failure to restrain the Chinese Nationalists. Furthermore, Alfred McCoy (1991) questions CIA's complicity in KMT's involvement in the opium trade, considering the CIA's role in facilitating the supply network for KMT and the alliance between the KMT and high-ranking Thai officials. After the joint Sino-Burmese military campaign evicted the KMT remnant guerrillas from the Shan states in 1961, the guerrillas retreated across the border to Thailand and dominated the opium trade in the "Golden Triangle" region until the 1980s. Remnant members of the 93rd Division and their descendants have since formed several communities in Thailand, most notably Santikhiri in Chiang Rai Province.

== In popular culture ==
The escape of the KMT and their dependents from Yunnan Province to Burma has been given a sympathetic portrayal in A Home Too Far, a 1990 Taiwanese war drama film directed by Kevin Chu starring Andy Lau and Tou Chung-hua. It is based on a novel by Bo Yang, which is based on the true story of the KMT's experience in Burma's border and invasion attempts in Yunnan Province.

== See also ==
- Kuomintang Islamic insurgency
- Republic of China in the Vietnam War
- Taiwanese Army on Phu Quoc Island
