= 93rd Rifle Division (1936–1942) =

Infantry division of the Red Army that fought in World War II

- Active: 1936–1942
- Country: Soviet Union
- Branch: Red Army
- Type: Infantry
- Engagements: Battle of Moscow
- Battle honours: East Siberian

Commanders
- Notable commanders: Konstantin Erastov

The 93rd Rifle Division (Russian: 93-я стрелковая дивизия) was an infantry division of the Red Army that fought in World War II. Formed in 1936, the division served in the Transbaikal region before the war began. In October 1941, it was transferred west to fight in the Battle of Moscow. For its actions in the Soviet counteroffensive during the battle, the division became the 26th Guards Rifle Division in April 1942.

== History ==
The 93rd Rifle Division was formed in May 1936 in the military garrison of Antipikha near Chita with cadre from the 106th Rifle Regiment of the 36th Rifle Division of the Transbaikal Military District. The division included the 277th, 278th and 279th Rifle Regiments. 35th Rifle Division assistant commander Kombrig Aleksey Meshkov was appointed division commander. The division received the East Siberian honorific on 31 October 1936. Meshkov was relieved of command in October 1937, arrested during the Great Purge, and died in prison. His successor, Kombrig Nikolay Ivanovich Nikitin, shot himself on 14 July 1938 to avoid arrest. Other division officers repressed included assistant commander Colonel Tikhon Davydov, imprisoned, and chief of artillery Colonel Sergey Figurin, dismissed from the army for political reasons. All three regimental commanders were arrested and two of them later released.

The division was mobilized from conscripts and transferred to Dauriya to defend against a possible Japanese attack from Manchuria during May and June 1939. The mobilization ended in June 1939, and the division historical form considered this event the beginning of the division. Colonel Konstantin Erastov, who was promoted to the rank of kombrig on 4 November 1939 and became a major general on 4 June 1940, was appointed division commander on 14 August 1939. During the Battles of Khalkhin Gol, the division sent nine march battalions of replacements to the front. After the end of the fighting, the 93rd returned to winter quarters at Antipikha in October. The division formed a ski battalion selected from its best personnel for the Winter War that went to the front in November. The battalion returned to the division after the war ended, with 77 of its soldiers having been decorated.

After the end of the Battles of Khalkin Gol and the mid-1940 reorganization of the command arrangements in the Transbaikal, the 93rd came under the direct control of the Transbaikal Military District. When Operation Barbarossa began, the 93rd included the following units:

- 51st Rifle Regiment
- 129th Rifle Regiment
- 266th Rifle Regiment
- 100th Artillery Regiment
- 128th Howitzer Artillery Regiment (before 1 April 1942)
- 55th Reconnaissance Battalion
- 144th Separate Anti-Tank Battalion
- 105th Separate Anti-Aircraft Artillery Battalion
- 107th Sapper Battalion
- 117th Separate Signals Battalion
- 31st Auto Transport Battalion
- 82nd Medical-Sanitary Battalion
- 33rd Separate Chemical Defense Company
- 63rd Field Bakery

After Operation Barbarossa began on 22 June 1941, the division was moved forward to the Dauriya steppes where it spent two months digging border defenses in the stony soil along a 56-kilometer line. The relocation of the 93rd from the Transbaikal to the Eastern Front began on 7 October, and on arrival it was concentrated in the Podolsk area. It was ordered to eliminate the German breakthrough of the front of the 43rd Army in the area of Kamenka on 20 October, entering battle on 26 October. The division stopped the German advance and pushed the German troops back to the line of the Nara river. During October and November the division fought in defensive battles as part of the 43rd Army on the Maloyaroslavets and Naro-Fominsk axis. From mid-December, the division fought in the Soviet winter counteroffensive during the Battle of Moscow. Initially remaining part of the 43rd Army for this operation, it was shifted to the 33rd Army on 26 December. The division advanced up to 150 kilometers during the counteroffensive, fighting its way to the Vorya river near Vyazma by the end of the counteroffensive in late March. The division went on the defensive on the line of the Vorya when the counteroffensive came to a halt.

The division took up defensive positions southwest of Podolsk on 24 October, assigned to the 43rd Army of the Western Front, and entered battle on 26 October, stopping the German advance on the Nara river line. The 93rd fought its way to the Vorya river by the end of the counteroffensive. Erastov, who received the Order of the Red Banner for his leadership of the division, was transferred to command another division. The division's chief of staff, Colonel Nikolay Korzhenevsky, succeeded him as its commander on 31 March. In recognition of its performance during the counteroffensive, the division was reorganized as an elite Guards unit, the 26th Guards Rifle Division, on 20 April 1942.

== Commanders ==
The following officers commanded the division:

- Kombrig Aleksey Meshkov (June 1935 – October 1937)
- Colonel Nikolay Ivanovich Nikitin (October 1937 – committed suicide 14 July 1938)
- Colonel Konstantin Erastov (14 August 1939 – 30 March 1942, promoted kombrig 4 November 1939, general-mayor 4 June 1940)
- Colonel Nikolay Korzhenevsky (31 March – 20 April 1942)
