= 1960–1961 campaign at the China–Burma border =

Campaign at the China–Burma border
- Part of the cross-strait conflict, the Myanmar conflict, and the Cold War in Asia
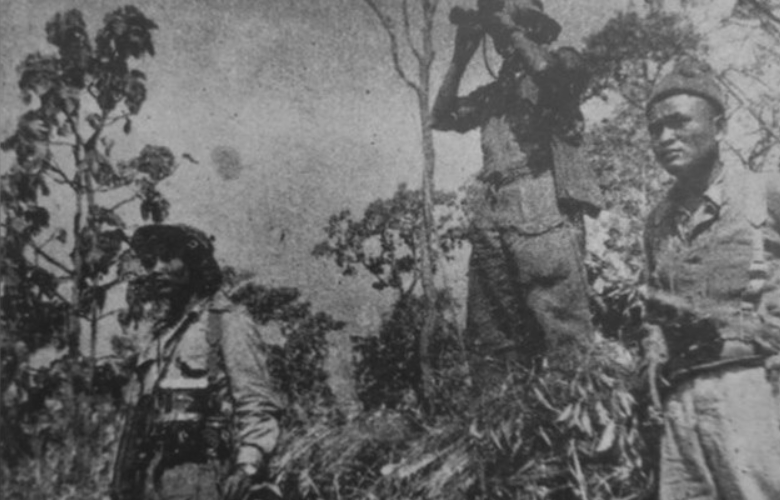
- Burmese troops on the lookout for Kuomintang troops near the China–Burma border, c. April 1954.
Date	14 November 1960 – 9 February 1961
Location	China–Burma border
Result	Withdrawal of Chinese nationalist forces from Burma

Belligerents
People's Republic of China Union of Burma	Republic of China

Commanders and leaders
Zhou Enlai; Li Xifu; Ding Rongchang; Cui Jiangong; U Nu; Ne Win	Li Mi; Liu Yuanlin; Wu Yunnuan; Wu Zubo; Li Wenhuan; Zhang Weicheng; Duan Xiwen

Units involved
People's Liberation Army; Burma Army	Republic of China Army (in Burma)

Strength
6,700	10,000

Casualties and losses
258 casualties	741 casualties

The campaign at the China–Burma border (simplified Chinese: 中缅边境作战; traditional Chinese: 中緬邊境作戰) was a series of battles fought along the China–Burma border after the Chinese Civil War, with the Communist People's Republic of China (PRC) and the Union of Burma on one side and the Nationalist forces of the Republic of China (ROC) on the other. The Chinese government refers to the campaign as the China–Burma border demarcation and security operation (中缅边境勘界警卫作战; 中緬邊境勘界警衛作戰).

== Background ==
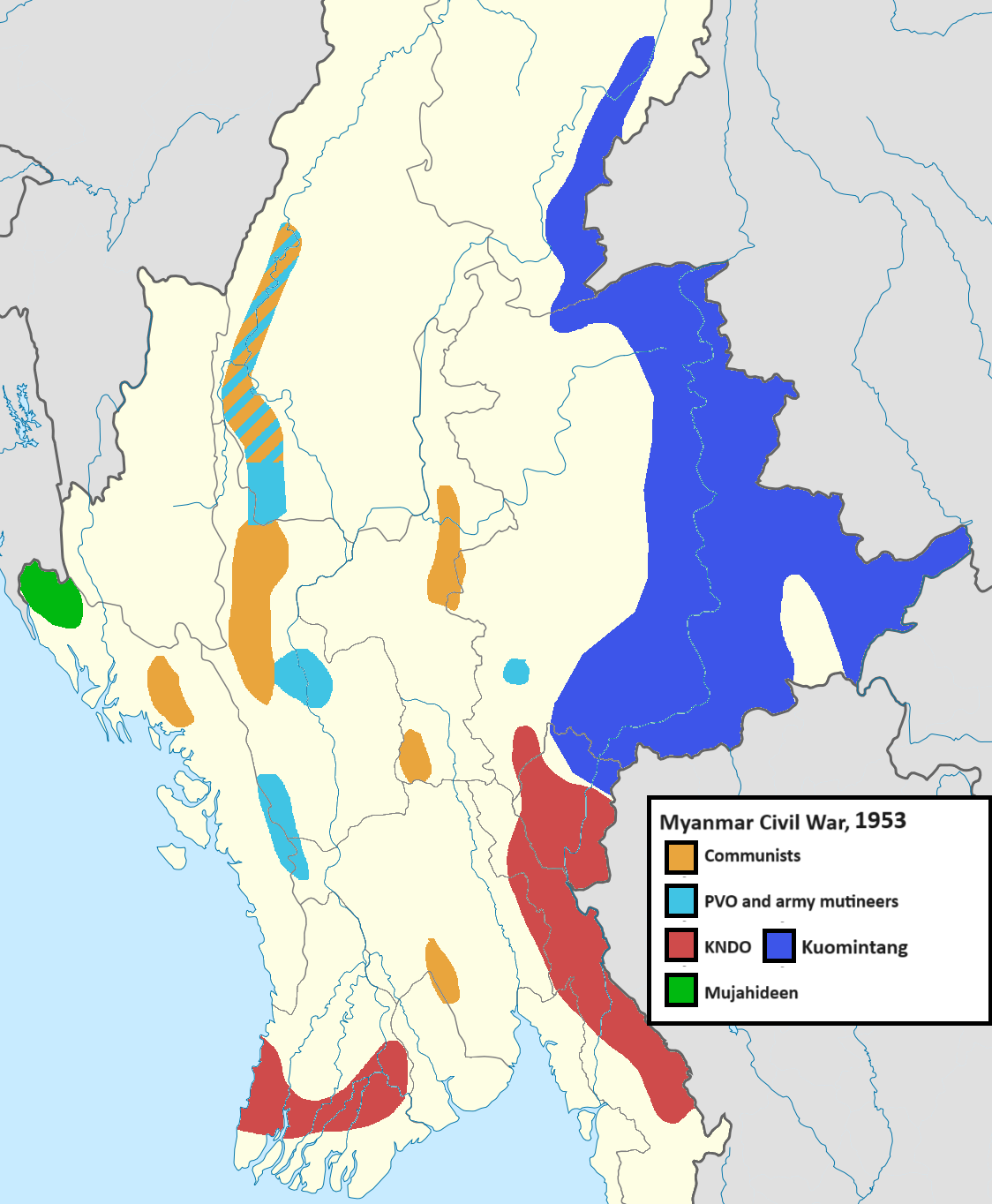
Map of civil war in Burma in 1953. The Kuomintang renmants controlled much of the eastern border.

After being defeated in the Chinese Civil War, parts of the Nationalist Army retreated south and crossed the border into Burma. The United States supported the Nationalist forces in the hope that they would harass the People's Republic of China from Southwestern China, thereby diverting Chinese resources from the Korean War.

To lead those troops better, the Nationalist government sent the original deputy commander-in-chief, Liu Yuanlin (柳元麟), back to Burma to form the Yunnan People's Anti-communist Volunteer Army in June 1954. By the early 1960s, the Nationalist forces in northern Burma had reached their peak and totaled nearly 10,000 troops. Because there was a much higher proportion of officers among the Nationalist forces in the China–Burma border, the structure of the Nationalist forces in northern Burma differed from the ordinary military structure: the Yunnan People's Anti-communist Volunteer Army was organised into five armies, each consisting of two to three divisions. Each division consisted of two to three regiments, and the brigade-level structure was eliminated. The size of each regiment of Yunnan People's Anti-communist Volunteer Army varied greatly in size from two dozen troops to over 1000 troops. The Nationalist force controlled an area along the China–Burma border that was 300 km long and 100 km deep, which was typically mountainous jungle regions in which the rainy season lasted six months, and the area was covered by fog for the majority of the year. Because there were few roads and trails, and the natural environment was very harsh, it was extremely difficult to navigate in the region.

On 28 January 1960, Burmese Premier Ne Win visited China and signed a deal aimed at solving the historical territorial disputes between China and Burma (specifically Jiangxinpo and Namwan). In October 1960, Burmese Prime Minister U Nu and Burmese Chief-of-Staff Ne Win visited China once again. On 1 October 1960, they signed a new border treaty with Chinese Premier Zhou Enlai. Before the border treaty was signed, both sides agreed in May 1960 on jointly eradicating the Chinese Nationalists from the border region. The treaty's requirement to survey of the China–Burma border for demarcation provided a reason for the later military actions.

== Prelude ==
In October 1960, the Communist high command ordered the Kunming Military Region to prepare for the campaign. In early November 1960, the Communists and the Burmese government held a joint conference on the matter of the Communist forces fighting in Burma. The Burmese representatives were headed by Brigadier Generals Aung Gyi and San Yu, and the Chinese communist representatives were headed by Ding Rongchang (丁荣昌), the deputy commander-in-chief of the communist Yunnan Provincial Military Region, and Cheng Xueyu (成学渝), the director of the Border Defense Directorate of the War Department of the General Staff Ministry of the People's Liberation Army. By 4 November 1960, a deal was signed in which communist forces were allowed to fight in Burma in a region that was 20 km deep and 300 km long along the border.

On 14 November 1960, the Communist central military committee formally issued the order to cross the border to destroy the Nationalist troops in Burma, according to the personal direction of Zhou Enlai. The political implication of the campaign was especially emphasized, with failure not an option. Most Communist forces would be deployed in the Mengma (孟马; 孟馬), Mengwa (孟瓦), and Sandao (三岛; 三島) regions. The Communists intended to avoid scattering the enemy and instead wanted to annihilate the enemy completely by first cutting off the Nationalists' route of retreat by a surprise attack.

There were also restrictions placed on the Communists' actions: for example, if the nationalists were to retreat towards the Burma–Laos–Thailand border, the Communist forces could not give chase on their own but would have to co-ordinate with the Burmese government first, just as in any other unexpected situation. Local civilian casualties were to be avoided at all costs. After receiving the order, the Communist Kunming Military Region decided to mobilize five infantry regiments and militias, totaling over 6,500, for the campaign, including a regiment from the 39th Division of the 13th Army, a regiment of the 40th Division of the 14th Army, and three border defense regiments.

For better coordinating of their actions in Burma, the Communist forces formed a frontline command at Fohai (佛海) in early November 1960. Li Xifu (黎锡福), the commander-in-chief of the Communist Yunnan Provincial Military Region, was named the commander-in-chief of the new frontline command. Ding Rongchang (丁荣昌) and Cui Jiangong (崔建功), the deputy commander of the Communist 13th Army, were named as the deputy commanders-in-chief of the new frontline command.

== Order of battle ==
The surviving Nationalist force at the China–Burma border peaked in the early 1960s and totaled almost 10,000 troops, excluding their noncombatant family members. The Nationalist force was divided into five armies, each of which was responsible for an area. In addition to the five areas of responsibility of the five armies, there were also the Ximeng (西盟) Military Region and the Mengbailiao (孟白了) Garrison Region. The Communists mobilized 6,500 troops, 4,500 of whom were deployed during the campaign.

=== Nationalist order of battle ===
Yunnan People's Anticommunist Volunteer Army (commander-in-chief: Liu Yuanlin, (柳元麟))

- 1st Army headquartered at Mengwa (孟瓦), commanded by Wu Yunnuan (吳運暖)
- 2nd Army headquartered at Suoyong (索永), commanded by Wu Zubo (吳祖柏)
- 3rd Army headquartered at Laidong (萊東), commanded by Li Wenhuan (李文煥)
- 4th Army headquartered at Mengma (孟馬), commanded by Zhang Weicheng (張偉成)
- 5th Army headquartered at Menglong (孟隆), commanded by Duan Xiwen (段希文)

=== Communist order of battle ===
- 117th Regiment of the 39th Division of the 13th Army
- 118th Regiment of the 40th Division of the 14th Army
- 116th Regiment
- 9th Border Defense Regiment of Yunnan Simao Military Sub-region
- 10th Border Defense Regiment of Yunnan Simao Military Sub-region
- 11th Border Defense Regiment of Yunnan Simao Military Sub-region
- Militia units

== Strategies ==
Both sides were limited by various factors. Their low numbers caused the Nationalists to adopt the strategy of avoiding fighting any large-scale battles and of instead concentrating on preserving their own strength. In the event of a Communist offensive, they would quickly withdraw away from the China–Burma border. The Communists, however, were limited by the red line that restricted their actions, which eventually resulted in the successful escape of most of the Nationalist forces to the Laos–Thailand border.

=== Nationalist strategy ===
The Nationalist frontline bordering China was 300 km long and 20 km deep and was the main target of the Communist offensive. There was a total of 22 Nationalist strongholds in the region, which comprised the headquarters of the nationalist 1st and 4th Armies, 2nd Division, 3rd Division, 5th Division, 6th Division, eight regimental headquarters, and eight guerrilla strike teams. The Nationalist force in the region totaled more than 800 troops and was divided into three lines of defense.

The first line of defense was manned by the 1st Army and its 3rd Division, totaled over 150 troops, and was stationed in various Nationalist strongholds, including Mengwa (孟瓦), Mengyu (孟育), Mengjing (孟景), and Jingkang (景康). With the exception of Jingkang (景康), all of the Nationalist strongholds in the first line of defense faced the Southern Luo (洛) River and had hilly forest to their rear. All of the roads and trails to and from China in the region were heavily mined. The Nationalist 4th Army was deployed to the south and the east of Mengyong (孟勇) and was the backbone of the Nationalist' second line of defense, and its 35th Regimentm totaling over 200 soldiers, was stationed at the critical peak 1404. The Mengbailiao (孟白了) and Jiangle (江拉) regions were the Nationalist third line of defense; the general headquarters of Nationalist Commander-in-Chief Liu Yuanlin (柳元麟) were set up in Mengbailiao (孟白了), with the training group, garrison regiment, and communication battalion totaling over 450 troops. The Jiangle (江拉) region was the Nationalist logistic headquarters and totaled over 200 troops, including the 1st Training Group.

=== Communist strategy ===
The Communists divided the combat zone into smaller individual areas and planned to cut off the Nationalists' retreating routes. The 117th Regiment and a portion of the 116th Regiment of the 39th Division of the Communist 13th Army were tasked with destroying the headquarters of the Nationalist 4th Army at Mengma (孟马), the Nationalist 6th Division, 2nd Division, 5th Regiment, 17th Regiment and four guerrilla strike teams, totaling 439 troops. In reality, the Communists overestimated the Nationalist strength, which totaled only 334 troops. The 118th Regiment of the 40th Division of the Communist 14th Army was tasked with destroying the headquarters of the Nationalist 1st Army at Mengwa (孟瓦), the garrison battalion, the headquarters of the Nationalist 3rd Division, the 8th Regiment, the 9th Regiment, and a guerrilla strike team totaling 265 troops. Once again, the Communists overestimated the Nationalist strength, which totaled only 156 troops.

The 11th Border Defense Regiment of the Communist Yunnan Simao Military Sub-region was tasked with destroying the Nationalist 7th Regiment and a guerrilla strike team totaling 59 troops, but the Communist intelligence had underestimated the nationalist strength, which totaled 81 troops. The 9th and 10th Border Defense Regiments of the Communist Yunnan Simao Military Sub-region were tasked with destroying the headquarters of the Nationalist 5th Division at Barbarians' Nest (Manwo, 蛮窝; 蠻窩), the 14th Regiment, the 1st Regiment and two guerrilla strike teams totaling 159 troops. The Communist intelligence had again underestimated the nationalist strength, which actually totaled 171 troops. The Communists mobilized a total of 6,639 troops of their own though not all of them had crossed the border. They divided their forces into 22 routes and would cross the border to attack in the early morning of 22 November 1960.

== First stage ==
The communist 2nd Company of the 9th Regiment of Border Defense and the 2nd Company of the 10th Regiment of Border Defense, who were tasked to attack Nationalist strongholds at Man'enai (曼俄乃), reached their target by 5:00 a.m. on 22 November 1960. However, the numerically inferior Nationalist troops had just learned of the upcoming attack and retreated and abandoned the stronghold. The Communists' main force immediately sent out four companies to chase the retreating nationalists and caught up with them around ten kilometres south of the stronghold. After the ensuing battles (including mopping-up operations), thirty-three nationalist troops, including Li Tai (李泰), the commander of the nationalist 5th Division, were killed, which destroyed the Nationalist garrison of the Man'enai (曼俄乃) stronghold.

Meanwhile, the Communist forces consisting of the 117th infantry regiment under the command of Yan Shouqing (阎守庆), the deputy commander of the 39th Division, the 118th infantry regiment under the command of Zhao Shiying (赵世英), the commander of the 40th Division, and the 1st Battalion of the 116th infantry regiment, attacked nationalist positions in Mengwa (孟瓦) and Mengma (孟马). The outnumbered Nationalist forces at those positions were no match with an enemy that enjoyed overwhelmingly-superior numbers and firepower. The Communist 117th infantry regiment succeeded in completely wiping out a 60-strong Nationalist battalion at the Tabanmai (踏板卖) stronghold and the 62-strong Nationalist battalion of the 7th Regiment at the Mengxie (孟歇) stronghold. Major General Meng Baoye (蒙宝业; 蒙寶業) and Colonel Meng Xian (蒙显; 蒙顯), the commander and deputy commander of the Nationalist 2nd Division, were both killed in action. Meanwhile, the Communist 118th infantry regiment attacked Nationalist positions at Mengwa (孟瓦), Jingkang (景康), Mengyu (孟育), and Mengjing (孟景) and succeeded in killing over 100 Nationalist troops and capturing Colonel Ye Wenqiang (叶文强), the deputy commander of the Nationalist 3rd Division.

After several hours of fierce battle, some Nationalist headquarters were destroyed. However, the Communits' complete lack of experience in jungle warfare in the mountainous region caused half of the six communist task forces that had been assigned to outflank the targets to fail to reach their destination on time. As a result, the Communists managed to annihilate Nationalist forces at only six out of the original 16 targets; the rest of the Nationalist forces slipped away. The subsequent mopping-up operation ended on 20 December 1960, which marked the end of the first stage of the campaign. A total of 467 Nationalist troops were killed in the region bounded by the red line, or only 53.4% of the original target set by the Communists. After the operation, the Burmese government asked the Communist force to stay in Burma to guard the local region against possible Nationalist counterattacks. Chinese Premier Zhou Enlai agreed and ordered the Communist troops to stay until the demarcation was completed.

== Second stage ==
After the first stage of the campaign had concluded, the surviving Nationalists decided that their strength was no match for the superior Communist force and that it was best to avoid confrontation with the enemy to conserve their strength. Instead, to make up for territory lost to the Communists in the first stage of the campaign, the Nationalists would gain control over territory from the Burmese government by attacking Burmese troops, who could not check the Nationalist advance. On the evening of 18 January 1961, Burmese liaison officers asked Chinese Communists for help on behalf of the Burmese government. The Communists decided to mobilize over 5,800 troops to launch the second stage of the campaign in late January to attack Nationalists beyond the red line. The Communists and the Burmese government reached a deal, allowing the Communist force to operate another 50 km beyond the red line to engage the 300,000 Nationalist troops in the Suoyong (索永) and Mengbailiao (孟白了) regions. To co-ordinate their actions better, the Communists established their frontline headquarters in Fohai (佛海), with Deputy Commander Cui Jiangong (崔建功) of the 13th Army as the commander and Chief-of-Staff Liang Zhongyu (梁中玉) of the 14th Army and Deputy Director of the Political Directorate Duan Siying (段思英) as deputy commanders.

The Communist 117th Regiment, leading the 2,966-strong attacking force, was tasked with attacking the surviving units of the Nationalists' 4th Army, 2nd Division, 9th Division, 10th Division, 11th Division, 7th Group of the Training Column, and Heavy Weaponry Group, totaling over 1,200 troops. Another Communist force, consisting of the 10th Regiment and the 11th Regiment of the Border Defense of the Simao Military Sub-region, totaling 1,420, was tasked with attacking the surviving Nationalist forces, totaling more than 680, including the surviving forces of the Nationalist general headquarters in Suoyong (索永), the headquarters of the 2nd Army in Baka (八卡), the headquarters of 1st Army at the Daling (大棱) River crossing point, the 3rd Division, the 8th Division, and the Zhongka (中卡) Squadron. The largest Communist force, totaling 3,012 and headed by the 118th Regiment, was tasked to attack the surviving units of over 1,200 Nationalists, including those from the southern frontline command headquarters, garrison regiment, training column (without its 7th Group), 2nd Group of the Training Column, 35th Regiment of the 3rd Army, and Officer Training Regiment.

On 25 January 1961, all of the Communist units began their assault by crossing the red line and attacking the regions north and west of the Mekong River. Nationalist Commander-in-Chief Liu Yuanlin (柳元麟) realised the Communist objective and immediately ordered a general retreat toward the Burma–Laos border under the cover of darkness the very same night and abandoned the base that they had controlled for more than a decade. By the next day, Nationalist strongholds including Baxili, (巴西里), Suoyong (索永), and Mengbailiao (孟白了) had fallen into Communist hands, and the Nationalist rear guards in charge of covering the retreat of the main force were destroyed.

The communists subsequently performed search-and-destroy operations to eradicate the surviving Nationalists in the newly-taken region and succeeded in killing the Nationalist director of the Political Directorate, Colonel Li Zixiong (李自雄), and a regimental commander, Colonel Bai Xianglin (白湘麟). However, except for the Communist force of the Simao Military Sub-region, which reached its destination of Baxili (巴西里) on time, numerous problems caused all of the other Communist forces to fail to reach their planned destination on time, which resulted in the killing of only 274 Nationalist troops. In addition to escaping to their new destination several hundred kilometres away in the border region of Burma–Laos–Thailand, the retreating Nationalists had also successfully managed to transport most of their equipment, supplies, and wounded with them in their escape. On 9 February 1961, the second stage concluded when all Communist units withdrew back to China, which marked the end of the campaign.

== Outcome ==
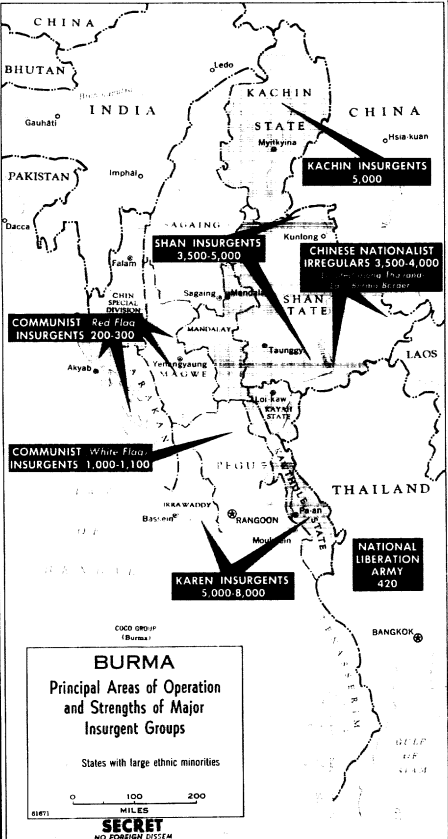
CIA map of insurgent activity in Burma in 1966, marking the continued presence of Kuomintang loyalists in the east.

The Communists succeeded in driving the Nationalists from their base after more than a decade. Control was returned of an area over 30,000 square kilometres with a population of over 100,000 to the Burmese government. However, the campaign also revealed serious and huge shortcomings of the Communist troop in jungle warfare, and the problems revealed later in the communist post-war analysis since most of the retreating Nationalists had successfully escaped to the Laos–Thailand border, several hundred kilometres away and formed a new base that survived until the second stage. The Nationalists, despite losing their 30,000-square-kilometre base, had nonetheless managed to retain most of their troops (around 90 per cent) and equipment to escape and to establish new bases in the new area. However, the new area was far less fertile than the land in their original base, which increasingly forced the Nationalists to depend on opium production and trade. Most of their area of control eventually became part of the infamous Golden Triangle.

== Aftermath ==
The opportunity to fight a campaign in an unfamiliar area exposed many Communist problems, which were nearly impossible to detect during peacetime. The Communists concluded that the fighting capability of their troops had significantly decreased merely a decade after the Nationalists had been driven from Mainland China. Furthermore, the previous experience, which had helped them to secure the victory over the Nationalists in Mainland China, was completely ill-suited for modern jungle warfare, and many problems urgently needed to be addressed such as the following:

- The complete lack of understanding of the local environment: there were numerous rivers, valleys, steep slopes, high mountain peaks in the rugged terrain, and roads were nearly nonexistent. The jungle was dense and the local area was rife with disease. Those factors were overlooked during the Communists' planning, which was based on the much more navigable mountainous terrain in China. As a result, none of the Communist units had been able to reach their destination on time during the first stage, and during the second stage, the average speed the Communist force achieved in the jungle had been only 300 metres per hour.
- The inability to cross rivers rapidly: the hastily prepared river training had consisted of only some swimming lessons for the troops, which proved to be totally inadequate. The slow speed of river crossings was a major factor that stopped Communist sieges, which were supposed to encircle the Nationalists but could not form in time and thus allowed the retreating nationalist troops to escape.
- The application of outdated experience: the officers of the World War II and the Chinese Civil War applied their past guerrilla experience to modern conventional jungle warfare, which prevented the Communists from achieving their goals. For example, the Communist forces lacked local maps of the region, and many commanders did not know how to read modern maps when they were available. As a result, troops were often completely lost in the jungle after they had traveled only a short distance from the border. The earlier battle experience of a decade ago was not applicable to fill the experience gaps in jungle warfare.
- The disorganised formation: many officers had been hastily sent to units they had never seen and did not know the true strength and weakness of the units that they commanded in the campaign. As a result, some orders were simply beyond a unit's ability to achieve, and other orders restricted the full combat potential of the units.
- The lack of necessary equipment needed for jungle warfare: the standard Soviet-type gear was completely ill-suited for jungle warfare and so there was a need to deploy new equipment, including river-crossing, road-building, and medical gear, but such equipment did not exist. That was the primary reason that non-combat casualties were several times higher than combat casualties.
- Poor tactics: most tactics devised by the staff officers were derived from mountainous warfare tactics, which were developed in the arid region in China and proved to be inadequate in the humid jungle warfare. Combined with the lack of equipment, the knowledge of the enemy was poor if existent, which resulted in miscommunications such as overestimation of enemy strength.
- Inability to take initiatives: the relative peacetime after the war had caused some officers to lose their original tenacity and ability to take initiatives. When encountering the enemy force, those officers took much more prudent approach of securing their own position first and waiting for reinforcements, instead of promptly attacking the enemy. However, most of the supposed formidable enemy strength turned out to be exaggerated because of miscommunications, the lack of equipment, and the poor tactics mentioned above. In fact, there were occasions in which commanders refused to follow the order to pursue the retreating enemy after it had been given twice since they believed the erroneous intelligence, which greatly exaggerated the enemy strength.

The Communists were shocked by the shortcomings exposed in the campaign. The deputy chief-of-staff and future 1980s Chinese Defense Minister, Zhang Aiping, and the commander-in-chief of Kunming Military Region and future 1990s Chinese Defense Minister, Qin Jiwei (秦基伟), were sent to lead a team to establish new training and tactics based on the experience gained in the campaign to correct the problems. As a result, the militaries of both the Kunming Military Region and the Guangzhou Military Region were drastically upgraded and improved very quickly after massive efforts. The improvements later proved to be vital when Chinese troops were deployed to North Vietnam and Laos as part of Chinese involvement in the Vietnam War.

== See also ==
- Kuomintang in Burma
- Kuomintang Chinese in Thailand
- Kuomintang Islamic insurgency (1950–1958)
- 1967 Opium War
