= 93rd Division =

In military terms, 93rd Division or 93rd Infantry Division may refer to:

- 93rd Division of the Chinese Revolutionary Army, part of the Kuomintang in Burma
- 93rd Division (People's Republic of China)
- 93rd Infantry Division (German Empire)
- 93rd Infantry Division (Wehrmacht), Germany
- 93rd Division (Imperial Japanese Army)
- 93rd Guards Rifle Division, Soviet Union, later the 93rd Guards Motor Rifle Division
- 93rd Motor Rifle Division, Soviet Union
- 93rd Rifle Division (1936–1942), Soviet Union
- 93rd Rifle Division (1942–1946), Soviet Union
- 93rd Mechanised Division, Ukraine, the former 93rd Guards Rifle Division
- 93rd Infantry Division (United States)

== See also ==
- List of military divisions by number
- 93rd Brigade (disambiguation)
- 93rd Regiment (disambiguation)
