= 93rd Brigade =

93rd Brigade may refer to:

== Russia ==
- 93rd Motor Rifle Brigade

== Ukraine ==
- 93rd Mechanized Brigade

== United Kingdom ==
- 93rd Brigade (United Kingdom)
- 93rd Brigade, Royal Field Artillery, a British Army unit during World War I
- 93rd (East Lancashire) Field Brigade, Royal Artillery, a British Army unit after World War I
- 93rd (Westmorland and Cumberland Yeomanry) Brigade, Royal Field Artillery, a British Army unit after World War I

== United States ==
- 93rd Infantry Brigade (United States)
- 93rd Theater Signal Brigade

== See also ==
- 93rd Division (disambiguation)
- 93rd Regiment (disambiguation)
- 93: Battle for Ukraine, a 2018 documentary film about the 93rd Mechanized Brigade (Ukraine)
