= China in the Vietnam War =

The Vietnam War was a major event that shaped the course of the world in the second half of the 20th century. Although it was a regional conflict that occurred on the Indochinese Peninsula, it profoundly affected the strategic interests of the People's Republic of China, the Soviet Union, and the United States as well as the relations between these great powers. China, in particular, also played an important role in the Vietnam wars starting from the First Indochina War. China militarily supported North Vietnam by providing extensive logistical, training, and material aid.

== Historical background ==
In October 1949, the People's Republic of China (PRC) was established in mainland China. In August 1949, Ho Chi Minh, leader of the Viet Minh, wrote to Mao Zedong requesting Chinese assistance in all forms. He subsequently made a secret visit to Beijing in January 1950. The PRC officially recognized the Democratic Republic of Vietnam (DRV), significantly changing the situation in the First Indochina War and influencing the Vietnam War later on. In April 1950, the PRC formed the Chinese Military Advisory Group (CMAG) to assist the Viet Minh, led by General Wei Guoqing, along with Senior General Chen Geng. The Viet Minh began receiving military aid, including equipment, advisers, and training from China.

== Reasons for China's involvement ==
=== Geopolitical realities ===
Throughout the 1950s and most of the 1960s, Mao considered the United States the primary threat to China's security and revolution. Indochina constituted one of the three fronts (the others being Korea and Taiwan) that Mao perceived as vulnerable to an invasion by imperialist countries. Thus, Mao's support for Ho Chi Minh started with the security concern. In the late 1960s and early 1970s, with the deteriorating relations between China and the Soviet Union, especially after the Sino-Soviet border conflict in March 1969, Mao further clarified that the Soviet Union was the primary threat to China's national security. Then he began to adjust his policies to America and encouraged the North Vietnamese to conclude a peace settlement.

=== International obligations ===
The sense of an international responsibility to help brotherly comrades and promote anti-imperialist revolution was another crucial factor in Beijing's Indochina policy. During Mao's December 1949 visit to the Soviet Union, Stalin sought Mao's assistance in supporting the Vietnamese Communists against France in the First Indochina War. Mao accepted Stalin's view of a "worldwide communist revolution" and agreed to share "the international responsibility" and support the Vietnamese communists. After Mao's return to China, the country began sending military advisors and military aid to the Vietnamese.

"In believing that China had a special role to play in the reshaping of a future revolutionary order in the world," Mao aimed at transforming not only the old China but also the old world order. In the late 1950s and early 1960s, Beijing's propaganda expressed it to be "a natural ally of the oppressed peoples of the world in their struggle for national liberation," justifying efforts to help North Vietnam.

=== Personality ===
The personalities of the leaders were also a factor in rallying PRC support for North Vietnam. Of special significance were Ho Chi Minh's personal interactions with Mao, Zhou Enlai, Liu Shaoqi, and other CCP leaders. Ho became familiar with them when he worked for the French Communist Party in Paris and later served as a Comintern agent in Canton assisting the labor and peasant movements there. "In deciding to assist the Viet Minh in 1950, Mao stressed the importance of reciprocating friendship."

=== Domestic political consideration ===
"The intention to use international struggle to promote domestic political agendas often figured prominently in Mao's deliberations on Vietnam." In his opinion, perception of China facing serious external threats would be an effective instrument to help strengthen the dynamics of revolutionary mobilization at home, as well as his authority and controlling position in China's political life. Thus, aiding Vietnam served Mao's purpose of getting support to reshape the Chinese state and society.

== The process of China's involvement ==
=== During the First Indochina War ===
The Chinese communist guerrilla leader Chu Chia-pi from Yunnan joined the Viet Minh in their fight against the French in 1948.

In January 1950, the People's Republic of China was the first state to establish diplomatic relations with the Democratic Republic of Vietnam, and the basis of relations changed from party-to-party to state-to-state. In the early 1950s, the Vietnamese communists confronted formidable enemies and Ho Chi Minh avidly sought advice and weapons from China. The PRC began to send their advisors and later form the Chinese Military Advisory Group (CMAG) to assist the Viet Minh forces led by Wei Guoqing and Chen Geng. CMAG and Viet Minh began training for their first campaign. In September 1950, the Border Campaigns were launched. And between April and September 1950, China sent to the Viet Minh 14,000 rifles and pistols, 1,700 machine guns and recoilless rifles, 150 mortars, 60 artillery pieces and 300 bazookas, as well as ammunition, medicine, communications materials, clothes and 2,800 tons of food.

In addition, a "political advisory group" was also sent from China to northern Vietnam in 1950, led by Luo Guibo. Luo went to Tonkin to "pass on China's experience in financial and economic work, the rectification of cadres' ideology and working style, government work and mobilization of the masses." Between 1951 and 1954, the Chinese helped the Vietnamese in training their military commanders; reorganizing their defense and financial systems. They also helped the Vietnamese to mobilize the peasants to support the war through land reform campaigns. China trained Vietnamese at an officer academy, communication, mechanic, and technology schools in Guangxi and Yunnan. Overall, there was a massive transfer of the Chinese experience of making a revolution to the Vietnamese.

Viet Minh newspaper, February 1954, featuring portraits of Chinese leaders and the editorial "Gratitude to China, Follow China's path"

China equipped and trained a Vietnamese rocket battalion and 75mm recoilless gun battalion which were deployed for the Battle of Điện Biên Phủ . It also provided war supplies and helped prepare the Việt Minh for field medical care and campaign hospital readiness.

From August 1950 to March 1954, the Chinese government provided US$43.2 billion worth of aid to Vietnam in the form of war material, medicine, and fuel.

=== Geneva Conference ===
In the years following the conclusion of the 1954 Geneva Conference, China desired a peaceful international environment in order to focus on domestic reconstruction. The Communist Party of Vietnam (CPV) faced two fundamental tasks: to reconstruct the north and to unify the south.

Ho Chi Minh did not attend the Geneva Conference and Zhou Enlai met with Ho in Liuzhou. China urged Ho to accept a partition of Vietnam and to replace military struggle with political struggle. This approach was criticized by some Vietnamese leaders including Le Duan, who later stated that "it was precisely Zhou Enlai who divided our country into two." Mao ultimately told Pham Van Dong that the Chinese approach had been a mistake:

I did say that we had made a mistake when we went to the Geneva Conference in 1954. At that time, President Ho Chi Minh wasn't totally satisfied. It was difficult for President Ho to give up the South, and now, when I think twice, I see that he was right.

In July 1954, the Indochina Settlement was signed at Geneva by the Viet Minh, France, China, and the Soviet Union. The most salient aspect of the accords was the division of Vietnam at the 17th parallel, with the Communist-led Democratic Republic of Vietnam in the north and the State of Vietnam under Bao Dai in the south.

=== After the Geneva Conference ===
To rebuild the north, the CPV immediately got assistance from China after the Geneva Conference. To help the DRV "relieve famine, rebuild the transportation systems, revive agriculture, reconstruct the urban economy, and improve the armed forces," Beijing agreed to provide rice, sent a team of economic advisers and experts to North Vietnam. In December 1954, China sent more than 2000 railroad workers to the DRV to repair railway lines, roads, and bridges. During Ho Chi Minh's official visit to China in 1955, Beijing agreed to provide a grant of $200 million to be used to build various projects. After that, they also established a manpower exchange program. Between 1955 and 1957, in addition to assistance from China, the Soviet Union also played an important role in helping DRV reconstruct and develop its economy.

When the 15th Plenum of the VWP Central Committee in 1959 authorized the use of armed struggle in the south, Hanoi kept asking Beijing for military aid. Under these circumstances and in response to Hanoi's requests, China offered substantial military aid to Vietnam before 1963. According to Chinese sources, "during the 1956–63 period, China military aid to Vietnam totaled 320 million yuan. China's arms shipments to Vietnam included 270,000 guns, over 10,000 pieces of artillery, 200 million bullets of different types, 2.02 million artillery shells, 15,000 wire transmitters, 5,000 radio transmitters, over 1,000 trucks, 15 planes, 28 naval vessels, and 1.18 million sets of military uniforms." It was China's aid to North Vietnam from 1955 to 1963 that effectively gave the North the resources needed to begin the insurgency in the South.

In the early 1960s, Chinese state-owned enterprise Anshan Iron and Steel Works (Angang) supported the construction of Vietnam's first modern steel enterprise, Thai Nguyen Iron and Steel Company. It sent experts to the steelworks and trained hundreds of Vietnamese workers. When American attacks later damaged the facilities, Angang worked on the restoration, including through manufacturing essential equipment.

=== Confronting U.S. escalation ===
The catalyst for the Vietnam War was the controversial Gulf of Tonkin incident in August 1964. "To confront the increasing U.S. pressure in Indochina, Beijing stepped up its coordination with the Vietnamese and Laotian parties." People's Liberation Army units in areas bordering Vietnam increased their numbers and China began providing military assistance to North Vietnam.

In response to U.S. bombing of North Vietnam, China launched the Resist America, Aid Vietnam campaign. The campaign themes denounced U.S. imperialism and promoted Vietnamese resistance. Local communist party cadre organized mass meetings and street demonstrations, and millions of people across the country marched in support of the campaign between February 9 and February 11, 1965. The communist party expanded the campaign into cultural media such as film and photography exhibitions, singing contests, and street performances.

In April 1965, the U.S. Operation Rolling Thunder prompted the communist party to accelerate war preparations in major cities, particularly air defense and citizen militia drills. The party began emphasizing that, in addition to preparing for the risk of U.S. bombing of China, the Chinese people should be prepared to handle the worst-case scenario of having to fight on Chinese soil.

To counter U.S. airstrikes, Ho requested Chinese Anti-Aircraft Artillery (AAA) units in a meeting with Mao in May 1965. In response, People's Liberation Army (PLA) forces began flowing into North Vietnam in July 1965 to help defend Hanoi and its major transportation systems. The total number of Chinese troops in North Vietnam between June 1965 and March 1968 amounted to over 320,000. "The peak year was 1967 when 170,000 Chinese soldiers were present." In the same year the PLA and People's Army of Vietnam (PAVN) & Viet Cong (VC) made an agreement under which the PLA provided the PAVN/VC with 5,670 sets of uniforms, 5,670 pairs of shoes, 567 tons of rice, 20.7 tons of salt, 55.2 tons of meat, 20.7 tons of fish, 20.7 tons of sesame and peanuts, 20.7 tons of beans, 20.7 tons of lard, 6.9 tons of soy sauce, 20,7 tons of white sugar, 8,000 toothbrushes, 11,100 tubes of toothpaste, 35,300 bars of soap, and 109,000 cases of cigarettes. In total, the agreement included 687 different items, covering such goods as table tennis balls, volleyballs, harmonicas, playing cards, pins, fountain pen ink, sewing needle, and vegetable seeds.

China began sending its troops to North Vietnam in July 1965. These forces operated air defenses, built and repaired infrastructure like roads, railroads, and bridges, and built factories.

Such allowed Hanoi to use its own manpower for participating in battles in the South and maintaining the transport and communication lines between the North and the South and played a role in deterring further American expansion of the war into the North.

=== The end of China's assistance ===
Military aid given to North Vietnam by China
Year	Guns	Artillery pieces	Bullets	Artillery shells	Radio transmitters	Telephones	Tanks	Planes	Automobiles
1964	80,500	1,205	25,240,000	335,000	426	2,941	16	18	25
1965	220,767	4,439	114,010,000	1,800,000	2,779	9,502	?	2	114
1966	141,531	3,362	178,120,000	1,066,000	1,568	2,235	?	?	96
1967	146,600	3,984	147,000,000	1,363,000	2,464	2,289	26	70	435
1968	219,899	7,087	247,920,000	2,082,000	1,854	3,313	18	?	454
1969	139,900	3,906	119,117,000	1,357,000	2,210	3,453	?	?	162
1970	101,800	2,212	29,010,000	397,000	950	1,600	?	?	?
1971	143,100	7,898	57,190,000	1,899,000	2,464	4,424	80	4	4,011
1972	189,000	9,238	40,000,000	2,210,000	4,370	5,905	220	14	8,758
1973	233,500	9,912	40,000,000	2,210,000	4,335	6,447	120	36	1,210
1974	164,500	6,406	30,000,000	1,390,000	5,148	4,663	80	?	506
1975	141,800	4,880	20,600,000	965,000	2,240	2,150	?	20	?
Total	1,922,897	64,529	1,048,207,000	17,074,000	30,808	48,922	560	164	15,771

China's supply of weapons and other military equipment to Vietnam sharply increased in 1965 compared with 1964. The amount of China's military supply fluctuated between 1965 and 1968, although the total value of material supplies remained at roughly the same level. The presence of Chinese soldiers in North Vietnam peaked in 1967, with 170,000. But then in 1969–70, a sharp drop occurred, at the same time that all China's troops were pulled back. Not until 1972 would there be another significant increase in China's military delivery to Vietnam. Another figure shows that "When the last Chinese troops withdrew from Vietnam in August 1973, 1,100 soldiers had lost their lives and 4,200 had been wounded."

In 1968, China's strategic environment changed as Sino-Soviet relations took a decisive turn for the worse. When China was seeking rapprochement with America, "North Vietnam was still locked in a desperate struggle with the Americans," which created serious implications for Sino-DRV relations. Relations between China and North Vietnam, and China's assistance to North Vietnam, declined over 1969–1970.

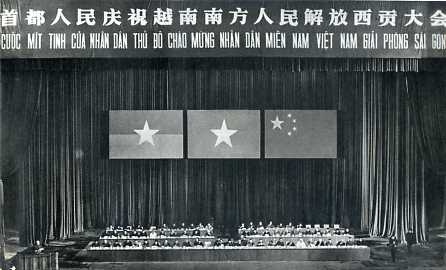
Rally in Beijing celebrating the 'liberation of Saigon', May 1975

== International concerns about China's involvement ==
The Vietnam War affected the strategic interests of the People's Republic of China, the United States, and the Soviet Union as well as the relations between those great powers. Thus, different perspectives can give different ideas about China's involvement in the Vietnam wars, especially from outsiders' point of view, and may argue that there were ambitions behind China's engagement.

=== Chinese considerations ===
Jian Chen argues that China, as a beneficiary of the agreement following the Geneva Conference, desired to tackle domestic problems, rather than get involved in another direct Sino-American confrontation after the Korean War. China's intention can also be proved directly by Zhou Enlai's talk with Ho Chi Minh and Pham Van Dong in November 1956. Zhou repeatedly emphasized that "the unification should be regarded as a long-term struggle" and that "only when the North had been consolidated with extensive efforts, would it become possible to talk about how to win over the South and how to unify the country." Thus, he concluded the leaders in Beijing never encouraged Hanoi to liberate the South militarily.

Qiang Zhai had the same ideas in his book and pointed out Chinese gave Ho Chi Minh and his movement much support, but Ho was his own master and set his own agenda. The clearest example occurred after the Geneva Conference of 1954 when the French withdrew from North Vietnam. Ho Chi Minh dreamed to expand his success from north to south and unify his country, which worried the Chinese, who feared the triggering of American intervention. After all, China had just fought the Korean War against the Americans, which had placed enormous stress on the domestic economy. When the French withdrew from North Vietnam in 1954, the Chinese greatly wanted a relaxation of tensions in Southeast Asia since they did not want to fight another Korean War in Vietnam.

=== American considerations ===
Zhang Xiaoming suggests that although Mao Zedong's theory of world revolution determined China's response in using military force to aid North Vietnam and to resist the United States, Beijing may have wished only to deter, not to confront, Washington. However, American policymakers had a different interpretation, they perceived the battles in South Vietnam and other parts of Southeast Asia as a crucial signal of further Communist expansion. Thus, America increased its military involvement, and the Vietnam War intensified.

From an ideological perspective, Anthony Short believes there are various reasons for the US to intervene in the Vietnam War. He admitted American policy was based on European, rather than Asian, considerations. However, he also stated that the third-party action was essential, and there was a deep need for US moral leadership. He emphasized the global purposes of US policy stating that all Americans wanted was "to resist communism, to encourage free peoples throughout the world, and to strengthen democratic nations against aggression." There was a belief that China was the original domino and without help from the third party, Asian countries would not be able to resist communist pressure for long.

Moreover, Lin, M. stated that for both China and the United States, involvement in the war was based not only on Vietnam but also on China–United States relations. Lin mentioned that during the Johnson administration, the Vietnam War escalated, a major reason being the sense of threat brought by China's "wars of national liberation" in Vietnam. However, from the American perspective, such "aid" was a bigger plot, and Johnson feared Communist expansionism in Asia during his administration. The perspective of his article and its interpretation of American policymakers are different from former works based on Chinese historical sources. To a large extent, the interaction between China and the United States determined each other's participation during the Vietnam War. China worried about the response of the United States, which feared that China was a more radical and militant communist power in Asia.

=== Soviet considerations ===
Zhai also tried to put China-Vietnam relations in the framework of Sino-Soviet relations and noted an international division of labor between the two major Communist powers: the Soviet Union and China. In the late 1940s and early 1950s, Stalin paid attention to supporting the Communist parties in Eastern Europe, and Mao was expected to encourage the Communist movements in Southeast Asia. Thus, in the early 1950s, the Soviet Union's role in the Vietnamese struggle was minimal. Meanwhile, the Soviet Union sought western understanding of its policy and greatly tried to avoid getting involved in the war. China's influence in Vietnam grew, and the Soviet Union's interest in the Indochina region weakened accordingly. When Nikita Khrushchev was removed from power in 1964, the new leaders of the Soviet Union increased military and economic aid to North Vietnam, apparently to compete with China to win North Vietnam's support for the Soviet Union in the socialist camp. In 1965, China increased its aid to Vietnam, as part of competence with the Soviet Union over Vietnam. Thus, the Soviets regarded the purpose of China's aid to Vietnam as not only to carry forward the spirit of internationalism and to support the world revolution but also to expand their influence in Indochina.

Gaiduk argues that although the Soviet Union subsequently provided much-needed economic assistance to North Vietnam, it deliberately chose to let China play a central role in supplying such aid, which made Soviet actions increasingly dependent on Chinese co-operation and goodwill. In addition, he also rectify the faulty impression promoted in Chinese literature on that topic and states that from the Chinese perspective, Moscow was merely an appendix to Beijing's Vietnam policy. Actually, the consideration of the Soviet influence also attaches great importance, which is potential and critical and could not be underestimated. Thus, Gaiduk emphasized that it was the central role Moscow and Beijing played in the unfolding Vietnam War, especially in the context of great power politics.

Moreover, Olsen mentioned that by early 1962, Soviet eyes viewed China to have become the most complicating factor within the Soviet–Vietnamese relationship. According to Soviet numbers, Chinese economic assistance to North Vietnam from 1955 to 1962 even exceeded Soviet assistance during the same period. Thus, all of those factors contributed to a closer relationship and increased the popularity of China in Vietnam. When the leaders in Hanoi, shortly after such a strong declaration of alliance with the Chinese, turned away from Beijing and towards Moscow, he suggests the most important reason to be the deteriorating security situation in Vietnam. From the Vietnamese perspective, the threat of escalating US intervention made the only possible and reliable ally by the Soviet Union. Although China had the manpower, it lacked the sophisticated weapons necessary to fight the Americans. Also, leaders in Hanoi were afraid of sole dependence on the Chinese, and Beijing completely refused even to consider any form of a negotiated solution. However, the Soviet Union expressed its willingness to negotiate. "Thus, it might have been Moscow's more positive attitude towards future negotiations, combined with a growing willingness to provide the Vietnamese with supplies for the war, that turned the tide from Beijing to Moscow."

=== Vietnamese considerations ===
Nguyen, L. H. T. mentioned the Vietnamese memory of the 1954 Geneva Conference and, more importantly, the need to maintain Soviet aid, which meant that Hanoi had to keep Beijing at a distance. However, bilateral relations between the two Asian allies on the eve of the Tet Offensive were strained. By 1968, the foundation that Sino-Vietnamese relations began to crack under the weight of the Soviet factor. She also argued that "it was Hanoi's decision to enter into negotiations with Washington as a result of the military stalemate in the wake of Tet that dealt the first major blow to Sino-Vietnamese relations during the Second Indochina War. In a sense, if the 1968 offensive planted a seed of doubt in Chinese thinking regarding Soviet influence in North Vietnam, the initiation of negotiations in Paris sprouted paranoia."

Zhang mentioned something of Vietnam's voice about China's assistance and that although Beijing's commitment to Hanoi was limited because of China's weak economy and lack of military modernization, the Vietnamese national pride and its sensitivity about self-sufficiency and self-reliance made Zhang notice Hanoi's attempt to deny China's role in the War. Zhai emphasized that according to Vietnamese 1979 White Paper, Hanoi criticized Beijing of providing North Vietnam with only "light weapons, want an early end to the Vietnam war, because they wanted not only to weaken the Vietnamese revolutionary forces, but also to avail of the publicity obtained by 'aiding Vietnam' to muster forces in Asia, Africa, and Latin America and to intensify their anti-Soviet campaign."

== Significance of China's involvement ==
According to historian Christopher Goscha, the Vietnamese were greatly relieved to have Chinese support. The military aid and training China provided were vital to the Vietnamese defeat of the French. "They also sent political advisors to remold the Vietnamese state, economy, and agricultural system in Communist ways. Then relations changed in the late 1960s, as the Cultural Revolution and Maoist visions of permanent revolutionary struggle ran up against important and geostrategic differences in Vietnam in the war against the US. Nonetheless, the Chinese continued to supply massive amounts of military and economic aid, as well as sending over 300,000 military support troops into North Vietnam. Internationalism suffered a serious blow. Additionally, the Sino-Soviet split damaged relations between China, the Soviet Union, and Vietnam.

== Military combats with Chinese forces ==
- Operation Rolling Thunder (1965–1968)
- Battle of the Paracel Islands (1974)

== See also ==
- Sino-Vietnamese War
- China–Vietnam relations
