= Vorya (Ugra) =

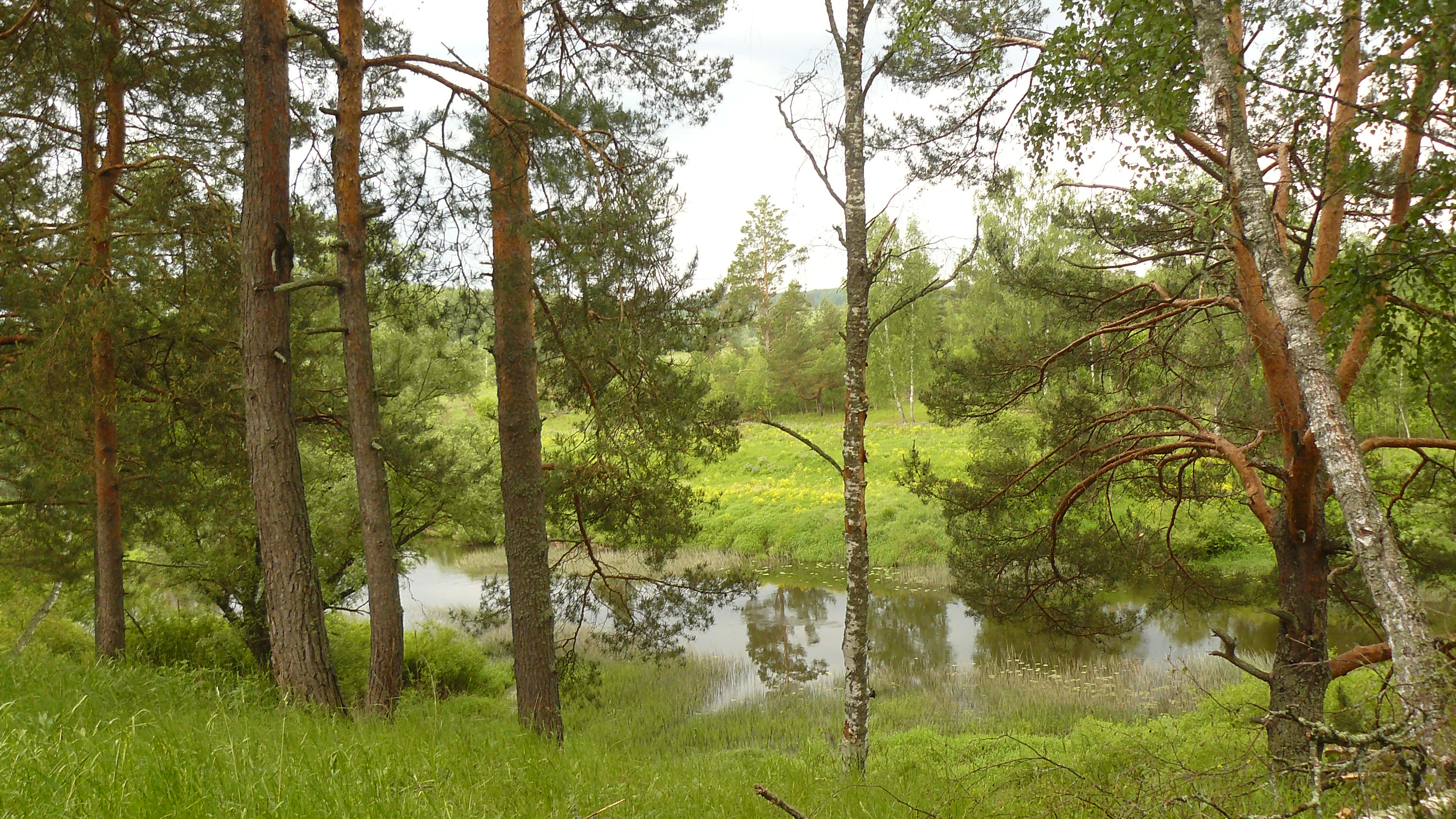
- The Vorya near Ivanovskoye, Iznoskovsky District
- Native name: Воря (Russian)

Location
- Country: Russia

Physical characteristics
- Source
  - location: Nekrasovo, Moscow Oblast
  - coordinates: 55°28′28″N 35°22′04″E
- Mouth: Ugra
  - coordinates: 54°53′50″N 34°59′41″E
- Length: 153 km (95 mi)
- Basin size: 1,530 km^{2} (590 sq mi)

Basin features
- Progression: Ugra→ Oka→ Volga→ Caspian Sea

The Vorya (Russian: Воря) is a river that flows through the Moscow and Smolensk Oblasts in Russia. The river is a left tributary of the Ugra, and its total length is 153 kilometers (95 mi) with a drainage basin of 1,530 square kilometers (590 mi^{2}).
