= Kuomintang Chinese in Thailand =

Ethnic group in Thailand

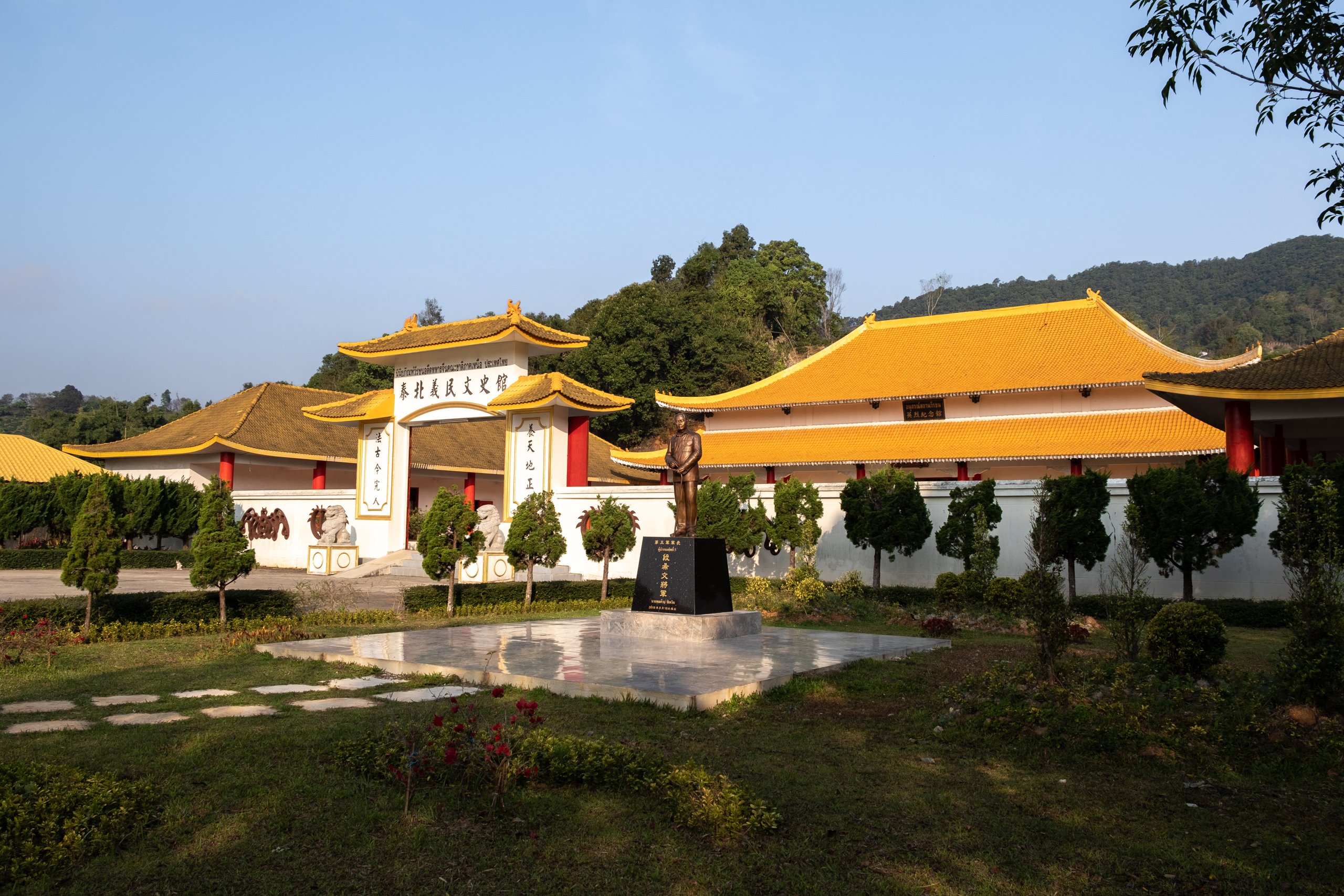
The Martyrs' Memorial Hall in Mae Salong serves as a museum to the KMT Chinese history in Thailand

The Kuomintang Chinese in Thailand are mainly Yunnanese Chinese descendants of Chinese Nationalist (Kuomintang, KMT) soldiers who settled in the mountainous border region of Northern Thailand in the 1960s, having been pushed out of Southern China following the KMT's defeat in the Chinese Civil War in 1949 and later from northern Burma, where they were based in the 1950s.

== History ==
After their defeat in the Chinese Civil War, parts of the Nationalist army retreated south and crossed the border into Burma as the People's Liberation Army entered Yunnan. The United States supported these Nationalist forces because the United States hoped they would harass the People's Republic of China from the southwest, thereby diverting Chinese resources from the Korean War. The Burmese government protested and international pressure increased. Beginning in 1953, several rounds of withdrawals of the Nationalist forces and their families were carried out. In 1960, joint military action by China and Burma expelled the remaining Nationalist forces from Burma, although some went on to settle in the Burma-Thailand borderlands.

The Thai government tolerated their presence in exchange for their assistance fighting against the communist insurgency in Thailand, but their role in the Golden Triangle's opium trade presented a major issue. By the 1980s, when the risk of insurgency had subsided, the government pursued a policy of assimilation, granting them Thai citizenship and encouraging them to abandon opium cultivation through crop substitution and other development programmes.

These Yunnanese Chinese in Thailand generally held strong anti-communist views and closely associated with the Republic of China on Taiwan. Thailand and the People's Republic of China established diplomatic relations in 1975, and many overseas Chinese communities in Thailand began reconnecting with communities in mainland China. The KMT Yunnanese communities were slower to re-connect with mainland China.

In the 1980s, the ROC's Chinese Association for Relief and Ensuing Services (zonghua jiuzhu zonghui) provided these communities with assistance in Chinese language education, including textbooks, teachers, and teacher training, as well as economic assistance. Students from ROC-supported schools in these communities were qualified for university admission on Taiwan if they passed the Overseas Examination (haiwai lianzhao). ROC officials also periodically visited these communities. These use of teaching materials and training from Taiwan reinforced the use of Traditional rather than Simplified Chinese characters.

However, ties with Taiwan have decreased, and the rise of mainland Chinese influence has led to controversy in some communities. Consistent with their desires to de-Sinicize Taiwan, the ROC's Democratic Progressive Party (DPP) governments began gradually decreasing funding support for the Yunnanese communities in the early 2000s.

The PRC began seeking to obtain the support of these communities and in June 2006, the Chinese Consul-General in Chiang Mai visited two Yunnanese communities and made donations to local schools. In 2011, the PRC government supported the establishment of Jiaolian High School in Chiang Mai. It was the first high school in the area to use the PRC curriculum. Hanban and the Yunnan Overseas Chinese Affairs Office donated textbooks and computers for the school. A number of other schools in these communities subsequently switched to a PRC-style curriculum. In 2019, universities in the PRC helped establish the Jiaolian Teachers College to further develop Chinese education in northern Thailand.

In early 2020, support from Taiwan further decreased when the DPP government concluded that the Chinese Association for Relief and Ensuing Services was a KMT party asset and froze its finances.

As of 2022, the KMT Chinese and other Yunnanese groups in Thailand, collectively known in Thai as Chin Haw, number around 200,000, inhabiting 108 villages in Mae Hong Son, Chiang Mai and Chiang Rai provinces. (KMT villages alone numbered 64 in 2014, according to Taiwan government statistics.) Among the best-known settlements are Mae Salong in Chiang Rai, Ban Rak Thai in Mae Hong Son, and Arunothai in Chiang Mai. Several villages have become known as tourist destinations for their distinct culture and architecture.

== See also ==
- Khun Sa, a Shan–Chinese warlord and major rival of the Kuomintang in the drug trade
- 1967 Opium War
