= Mae Fa Luang =

Mae Fa Luang may refer to:

- Mae Fa Luang District
- Mae Fa Luang Subdistrict
