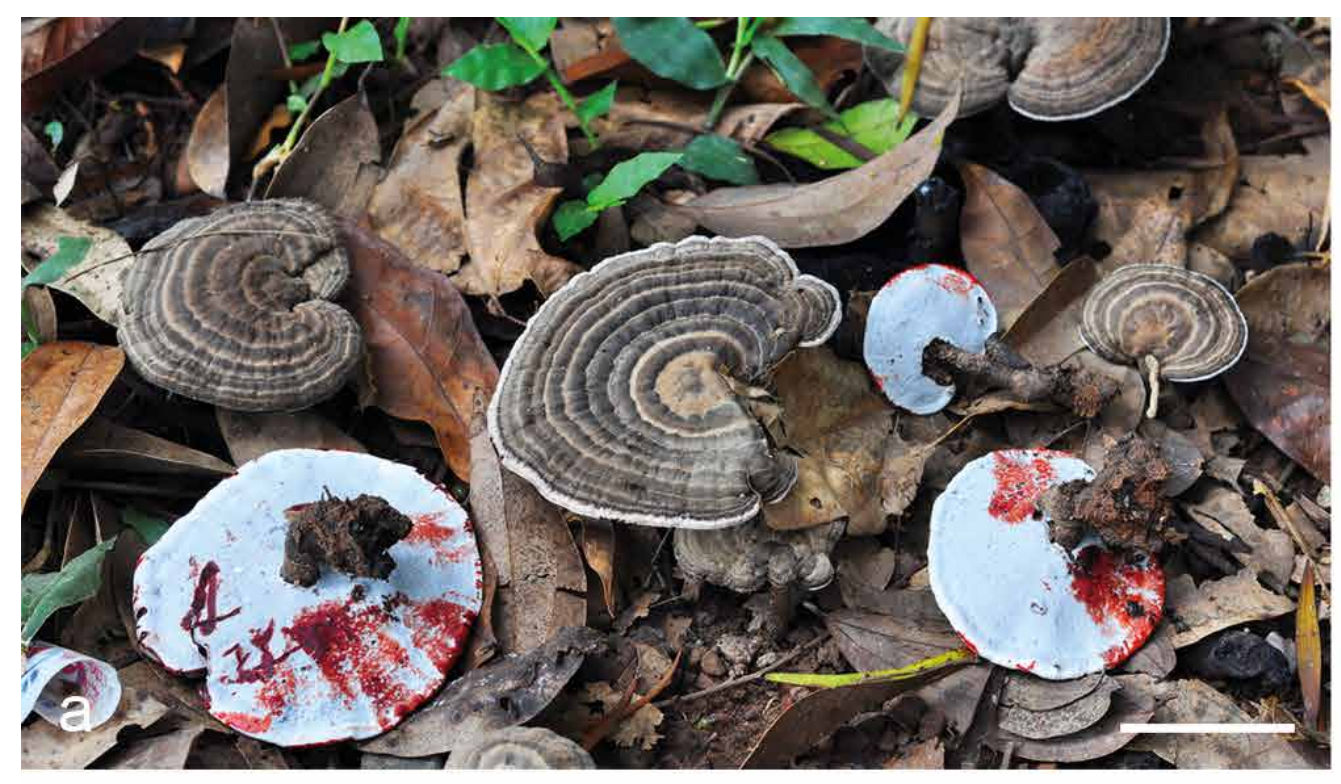
- Sanguinoderma rugosum

Scientific classification
- Kingdom: Fungi
- Division: Basidiomycota
- Class: Agaricomycetes
- Order: Polyporales
- Family: Ganodermataceae
- Genus: Sanguinoderma; Y.F.Sun, D.H.Costa & B.K.Cui (2020)

Type species
- Sanguinoderma rude

= Sanguinoderma =

Genus of fungi

Sanguinoderma is a genus of polypore fungi within the family Ganodermataceae and order Polyporales. It is identified by its characteristic of changing to a blood-red colour when its pore surfaces are bruised or damaged.

Macrofungi play a crucial and essential role in forest ecosystem processes, contributing significantly to ecological balance and energy flow. They display a wide variety of morphological forms and features in their basidiomata and basidiospores, and include groups such as polypores, corticioid fungi and hydnoid fungi within the wider category of aphyllophoroid fungi. The Sanguinoderma genus is considered a part of this macrofungal group.

== Taxonomy ==
The genus Sanguinoderma was established in 2020 and its type species Sanguinoderma rude described in the same publication.

Many species under Sanguinoderma were previously classified under the genus Amauroderma, which was established by Murrill under the family Ganodermataceae in 1905. Originally, taxonomy of the genus was largely dependent upon morphological and physical features. Phylogenetic analyses conducted by Costa-Rezende et al. (2016, 2017) using multiple gene regions identified two different and unrelated clades within Amauroderma sensu lato: the Amauroderma sensu stricto clade and the Amauroderma rude clade. As no clear morphological differences between the two clades were observed or identified at that time, no taxonomic revision was proposed. However, through phylogenetic analysis, morphological studies and taxonomic revisions by Yi-Fei Sun, D. H. Costa and Bao Kai Cui (2020), Sanguinoderma presently forms its own genus through the identification of its colour-changing characteristic. This could be due to the presence of tyrosine, an amino acid, that is enzymatically oxidised into a red intermediate compound before being converted into melanin. During this process, substances with antimicrobial and protective properties against harmful agents are also produced, giving rise to its medicinal properties.

Apart from its key feature of turning a deep red colour when pressed or damaged, Sanguinoderma is defined by having tough, woody fruiting bodies with dark caps rather than soft mushrooms. Its basidiospores have two layers and are not smooth, with the outer layer having rough, patterned textures, and the inner layer having microscopic spike-like structures.

List of species under genus Sanguinoderma
Species name	Locality	Basionym (if any)
Sanguinoderma bataanense (comb. nov)	CHINA, Hainan Province, Danzhou; Guangxi Autonomous Region, Baise, Jinzhongshan Nature Reserve	Amauroderma bataanense (Murrill 1908) Ganoderma bataanense (Murrill, 1912) Polystictus bataanensis (Murrill, 1912)
Sanguinoderma elmerianum (comb. nov)	CHINA, Yunnan Province, Xishuangbanna, Baka Xiao Zhai Nature Reserve; Guangdong Province, Zhaoqing, Dinghushan Nature Reserve	Amauroderma elmerianum (Murrill 1907) Ganoderma elmerianum (Murrill, 1912)
Sanguinoderma flavovirens (sp. nov)	ZAMBIA, Ndola, Ngosa Village	NIL
Sanguinoderma laceratumm (sp. nov)	CHINA, Yunnan Province, Baoshan, Gaoligongshan Nature Reserve	NIL
Sanguinoderma microporum (sp. nov)	CHINA, Hainan Province, Qiongzhong County, Limushan National Forest Park; Guangdong Province, Zhaoqing, Dinghushan Nature Reserve; Guangxi Autonomous Region, Fangchenggang, Shiwandashan Nature Reserve; Nanning, Qingxiushan Park	NIL
Sanguinoderma perplexum (comb. nov)	CHINA, Hainan Province, Changjiang County, Bawangling Nature Reserve	Amauroderma perplexum (Corner 1983)
Sanguinoderma reniforme (sp. nov)	ZAMBIA, Ndola, Ngosa Village	NIL
Sanguinoderma rude (comb. nov)	AUSTRALIA, Victoria State, Eastern Highlands; East Gippsland; Eastern Highlands; Gippsland Plain; Fairfield; Valley Reserve; Tasmania	Polyporus rudis (Berkeley, 1839) Amauroderma rude (Berkeley, 1920)
Sanguioderma rugosum (comb. nov)	CHINA, Guangdong Province, Shaoguan, Chebaling Nature Reserve; Zhaoqing, Heishiding Nature Reserve; Guangxi Autonomous Region, Nanning, Liangfengjiang National Forest Park; INDONESIA, West Java, Banten	Polyporus rugosus (Blume & T. Nees 1826) Amauroderma rugosum (Blume & T. Nees 1920)
Sanguinoderma sinuosum (sp. nov)	AUSTRALIA, Queensland State, Sunshine Coast	NIL
Sanguinoderma guangdongense (sp. nov)	CHINA, Guangdong, Huizhou; Guangdong, Shaoguan, Danxiashan Nature Reserve; THAILAND, Chiang Mai, Doi Saket	NIL
Sanguinoderma infundibulare (sp. nov)	CHINA, Guangdong, Shaoguan, Danxiashan Nature Reserve; Guangdong, Shaoguan, Danxiashan Nature Reserve	NIL
Sanguinoderma longistipitum (sp. nov)	CHINA, Yunnan, Honghe, Huanglianshan Forest Park; Yunnan, Jinghong, Xishuangbanna Botanical Garden; Hainan, Ledong County, Jianfengling Nature Reserve; THAILAND, Chiang Rai, Doi Mae Salong	NIL
Sanguinoderma melanocarpum (sp. nov)	MALAYSIA, Selangor, Kota Damansara, Community Forest Reserve; Selangor, Taman Bottani Negara Shah Alam	NIL
Sanguinoderma microsporum (sp. nov)	THAILAND, Chiang Mai, Doi Saket; CHINA, Hainan, Ledong County, Jianfengling Nature Reserve	NIL
Sanguinoderma tricolor (sp. nov)	MALAYSIA, Selangor, Kota Damansara, National Forest Reserve	NIL
Sanguinoderma leucomarginatum (sp. nov)	CHINA, Yunnan Province, Pu’er City, Laiyanghe Nature Reserve; Yunnan Province, Pu’er City, Laiyanghe Nature Reserve; Jinghong City, Xishuangbanna Nature Reserve	NIL
Sanguinoderma preussii (comb. nov)	THAILAND, Chiang Rai, Mae Salong Nok; CHINA, Yunnan Province, Pu’er City, Pu’er Forestry Park; Mengla County, Shangyong Nature Reserve; Bakaxiaozhai Nature Reserve	Ganoderma preussii (Henn, 1891) Amauroderma preussii (Henn, 1972) Fomes preussi (Henn, 1895) Polyporus preussi (Henn, 1912)
Sanguinoderma conjunctum (comb. nov)	ZIMBABWE, Manicaland, Chimanimani	Polyporus conjunctus (Lloyed, 1918)
Sanguinoderma fasciculatum (comb. nov)	CONGO	Ganoderma fasciculatum (Pat, 1895) Fomes fasciculatus (Pat, 1896) Scindalma fasciculatum (Pat, 1898) Amauroderma fasciculatum (Pat, 1920)
Sanguinoderma fuscoporium (comb. nov)	ZIMBABWE, Manicaland, Nyanga National Park, Rhodes Dam; Chimanimani National Park	Amauroderma fuscoporium (Wakef, 1948)
Sangunoderma concentricum (sp. nov)	CHINA, Yunnan Province, Dehong Prefecture	NIL
Sanguinoderma dehongense (sp. nov)	CHINA, Yunnan Province, Dehong Prefecture	NIL
Sanguinoderma ovisporum (sp. nov)	CHINA, Yunnan Province, Dehong Prefecture	NIL
Sanguinoderma aurantiacus (sp. nov)	CHINA, Yunnan Province, Dehong Prefecture	NIL
Sanguinoderma bambusae (sp. nov)	CHINA, Yunnan Province, Dehong Prefecture	NIL
Sanguinoderma niger (sp. nov)	CHINA, Guizhou Province, Anshun City	NIL

== Phylogeny ==
In the study done by Yi-Fei Sun, D. H. Costa and Bao Kai Cui (2020), taxonomic and phylogenetic analyses on Amauroderma sensu lato were conducted using different specimens, incorporating multiple genetic markers. The phylogenetic analyses based on multiple genetic markers support the polyphyletic nature of Amauroderma. Consistent with earlier findings, species formerly classified within Amauroderma sensu lato are resolved into four distinct clades that correspond to four genera: Amauroderma sensu stricto, Foraminispora, Furtadoa, and the newly established Sanguinoderma.

== Etymology ==
In Latin, Sanguino- means “blood” or “bloody”, while -derma means “skin”. Hence, Sanguinoderma is a Latin-derived compound term that is used to describe the tendency of the fungi pore surface to change colour, specifically into blood-red colour, when it is bruised.

== Distribution ==
In general, the family Ganodermataceae has a widespread distribution across saprotropic environments and is commonly found as a parasite in areas with living, rotting or dead woods and trees. Sanguinoderma has a widespread distribution across tropical and subtropical regions (mainly in the Paleotropical region), across Africa, Asia, Oceania and South America, and is found to inhabit different environments, particularly soily, saprotropic environments such as forest floors, fallen angiosperm wood, or humus or decomposing tree trunks. In rare cases, specific species may occasionally be found in more atypical habitats: for example, Sanguinoderma sinuosum has been reported to be found growing on sandy substrates in Australia. Another example is Sanguinoderma bambusae being reported from humus in forests that are dominated by the Dendrocalamus species, representing newly documented habitats for the genus.

A large proportion of the species in the genus were discovered and examined in China, specifically in Yunnan Province with the most abundant species distribution likely due to its tropical and subtropical monsoon climates and abundant vegetation types, followed by Thailand. Additionally, the type species Sanguinoderma rude is the most widely reported and distributed species, having been reported in a large variety of eight countries (America, Australia, Brazil, China, Laos, Malaysia, South Africa and Thailand).

According to the Global Biodiversity Information Facility (GBIF), there have been a total of 3,589 known occurrences of Sanguinoderma, with a vast majority (2,338 occurrences out of 3,589) being Sanguinoderma rude, followed by Sanguinoderma rugosum (362 occurrences out of 3,589). The map below shows how these occurrences are distributed globally.

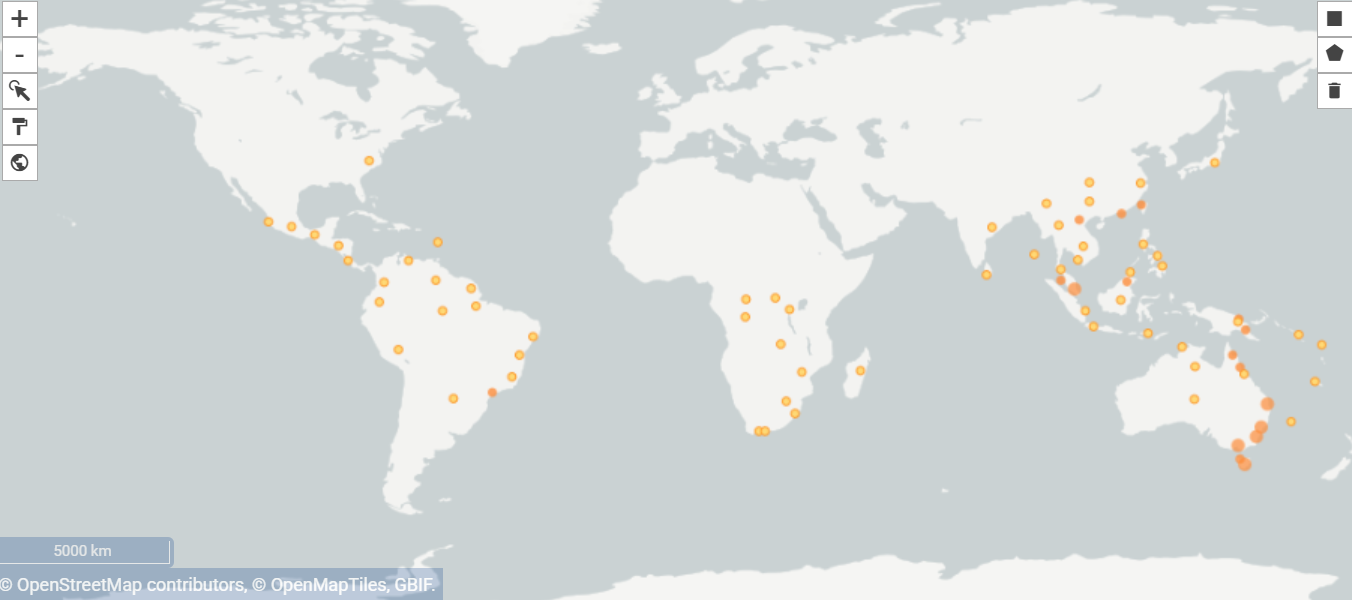
Global distribution of Sanguinoderma occurrences, contributed to by various authors on Global Biodiversity Information Facility (GBIF)
