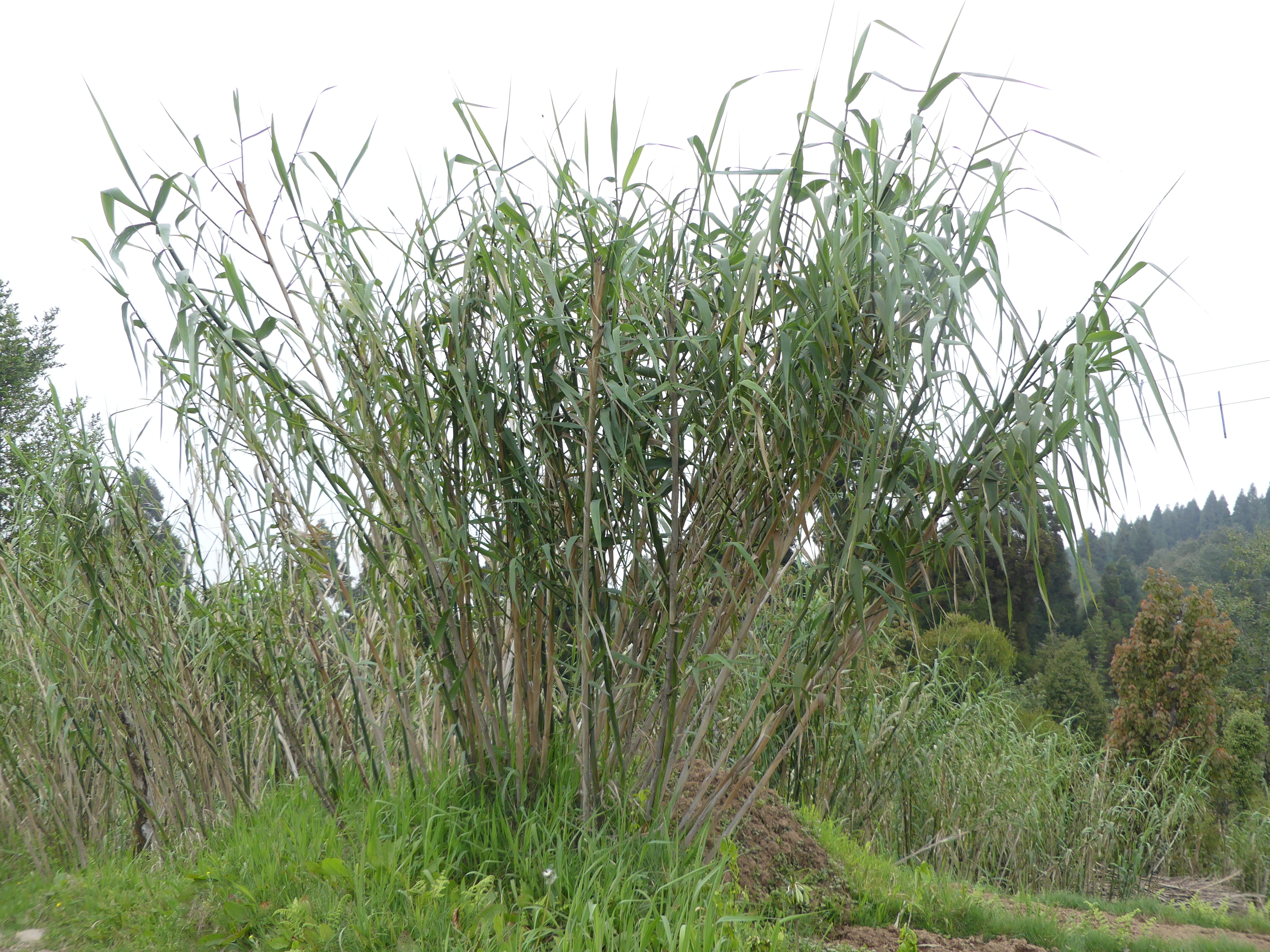
- Neyraudia reynaudiana

Scientific classification
- Kingdom: Plantae
- Clade: Tracheophytes
- Clade: Angiosperms
- Clade: Monocots
- Clade: Commelinids
- Order: Poales
- Family: Poaceae
- Subfamily: Chloridoideae
- Tribe: Triraphideae
- Genus: Neyraudia; Hook.f.

Type species
- Neyraudia madagascariensis (syn of N. arundinacea) (Kunth) Hook.f.

= Neyraudia =

Genus of grasses

Neyraudia is a genus of Asian and African plants in the grass family.

Species

- Neyraudia arundinacea (L.) Henrard - Zaire, Tanzania, Malawi, Madagascar, India, Nepal, Pakistan, Tajikistan, Indochina, Hainan, Java, Malaysia, Sumatra, Lesser Sunda Islands
- Neyraudia curvipes Ohwi - Sabah, Bhutan
- Neyraudia montana Keng - Anhui, Fujian, Hubei, Jiangxi, Zhejiang
- Neyraudia reynaudiana (Kunth) Keng ex Hitchc. - Anhui, Fujian, Gansu, Guangdong, Guangxi, Guizhou, Hainan, Hubei, Hunan, Jiangsu, Jiangxi, Sichuan, Taiwan, Tibet, Yunnan, Zhejiang, Bhutan, Cambodia, Assam, Java, Sulawesi, Lesser Sunda Islands, Japan, Laos, Malaysia, Myanmar, Nepal, Thailand, Vietnam; naturalized in Florida, Veracruz, Bahamas

formerly included

see Thysanolaena

- Neyraudia acarifera - Thysanolaena latifolia
