= Doi Mae Salong =

Hill in Chiang Rai province, Thailand

- ดอยแม่สลอง
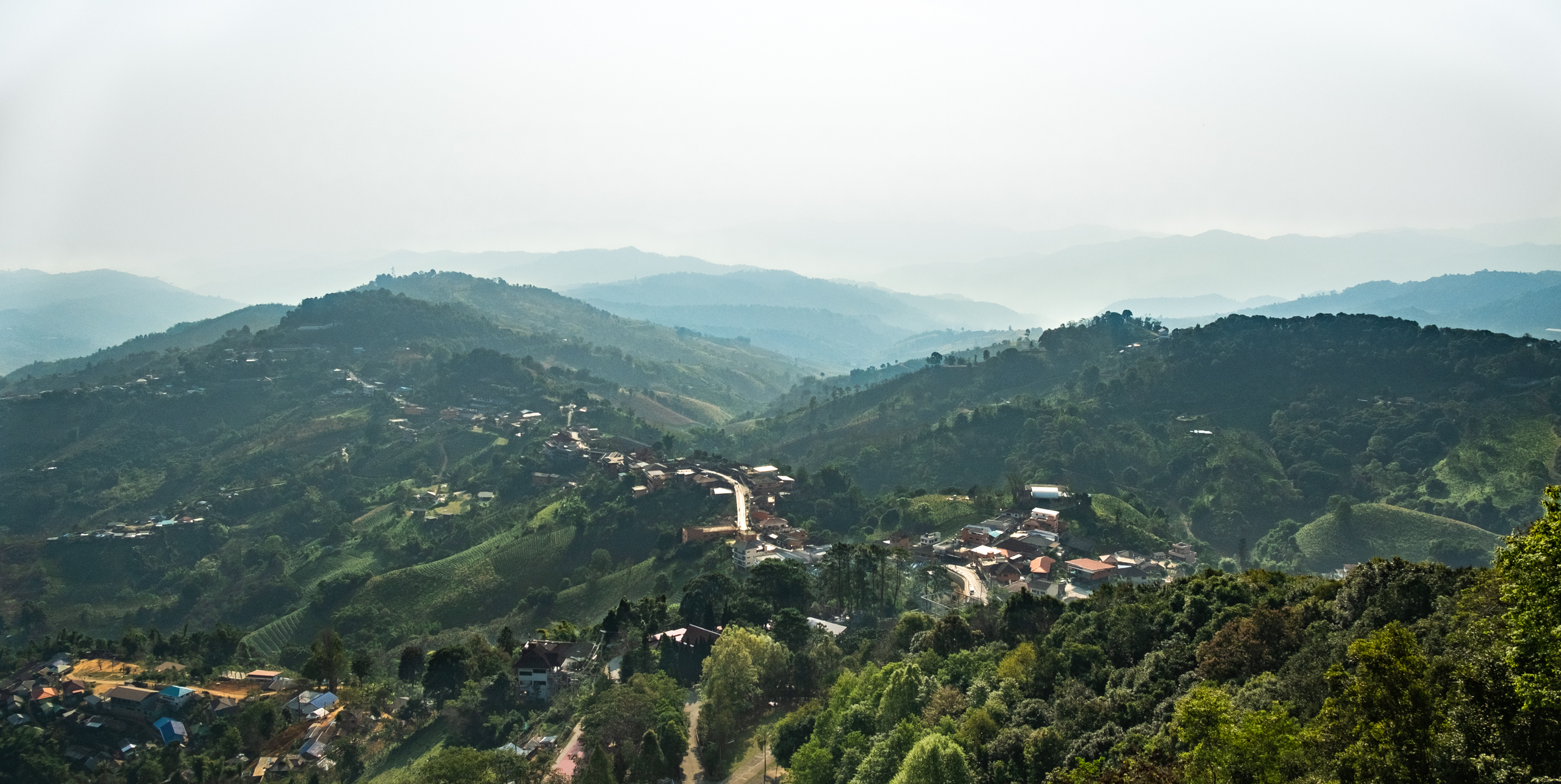
- Doi Mae Salong and Santikhiri town on the ridge

Highest point
- Elevation: 1,367 m (4,485 ft)
- Listing: List of mountains in Thailand
- Coordinates: 20°10′06″N 99°37′10″E

Geography
- Location within Thailand
- Location: Thailand, Chiang Rai Province
- Parent range: Daen Lao Range

Geology
- Mountain type: granite batholith

Climbing
- First ascent: unknown
- Easiest route: Hike or drive from Santikhiri

Doi Mae Salong (Thai: ดอยแม่สลอง) is a hill of the Dan Lao range in Chiang Rai province, Thailand, 6 km from the border with Burma. This mountain rises in Mae Fa Luang district. Its summit is near the town of Santikhiri, which is built on the ridge. The town is largely inhabited by ethnic Chinese originating from settlement by the paramilitary remnants of the Kuomintang army who were expelled from Burma in 1961.

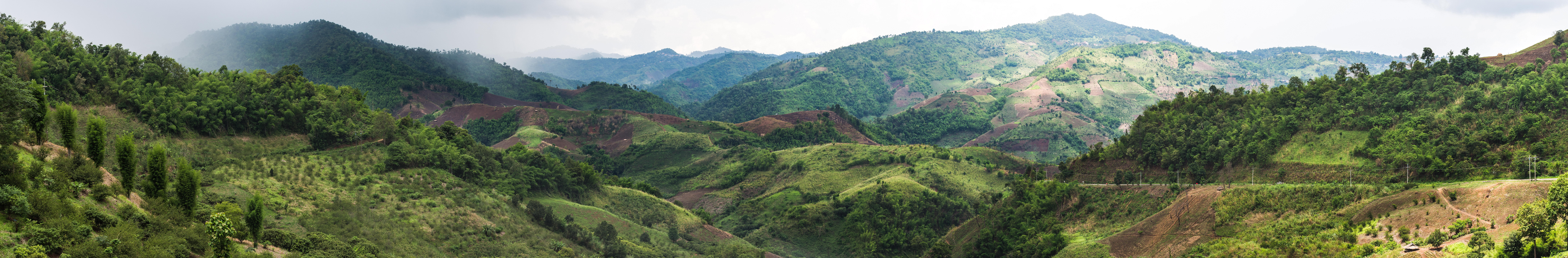
The mountain in the sunlight on the right is Doi Mae Salong; clouds release a downpour over the mountain on the left, rainy season, June 2014

== History ==
The Kuomintang army from China relocated to settle in Santikhiri in 1961 with approximately 15,000 soldiers. By 1969, they were formally integrated into the Thai military as the CIF (Chinese Irregular Forces) and fought for the Thai government against communist insurgents in Thailand, ultimately achieving victory. In recognition of their contributions, in 1982, the Thai government granted them the right to reside in Doi Mae Salong and extended Thai citizenship to them.

In 1971, Doi Mae Salong gained notoriety as a hub for heroin production stemming from opium cultivation. However, in response to changing circumstances, the community transitioned to alternative sources of income, focusing on fruit cultivation as a sustainable economic activity.

Kriangsak Chamanan, the prime minister at that time supported and did a project to plant tea and three-needled pine for reforesting at Doi Mae Salong. Doi Mae Salong became a tourist attraction in the name of "Santi Khiri village" (Thai: หมู่บ้านสันติครีรี, RTGS: muban santi khiri) which means peaceful place. The name of Doi Mae Salong in Chinese, Mei Si Le (美斯乐) is a homonym of the word "Mei Shi Le" (Chinese: 沒事了) that means peaceful place. Doi Mae Salong is known for growing tea, cherries, plums, lychee, and peaches.

== Nationalities ==
There are seven nationalities, and they can be classified into three large groups. The nationalities present include Chinese, Thai Yai, Akha, Lahu, Mien, Lishu, and Lawa. To classify people into three large groups, there are the Chinese people, Akha people, and Mien or Yao people. Most Chinese people live in Santi Khiri village. The other two groups live in Mae Chan Luang, Mea Dee, and Lao sib. Most of them originate from China or have a Chinese sub-nationality.

== Town ==
Doi Mae Salong is a small town situated atop a mountain, predominantly inhabited by native Chinese, and it serves as a tourist destination known for its tea, coffee, and fruit plantations. The town has a morning market where local villagers sell agricultural products and other goods. The majority of restaurants in the village are run by native Chinese residents who specialize in preparing Chinese or Yunnan cuisine. Accommodations in the village primarily consist of homestays, which are managed by local villagers, while some hotels are on larger properties in natural settings.

== Tourist attractions ==
The most famous activity at Doi Mae Salong is 'Oolong tea tasting', and also other agriculture such as coffee and fruit.

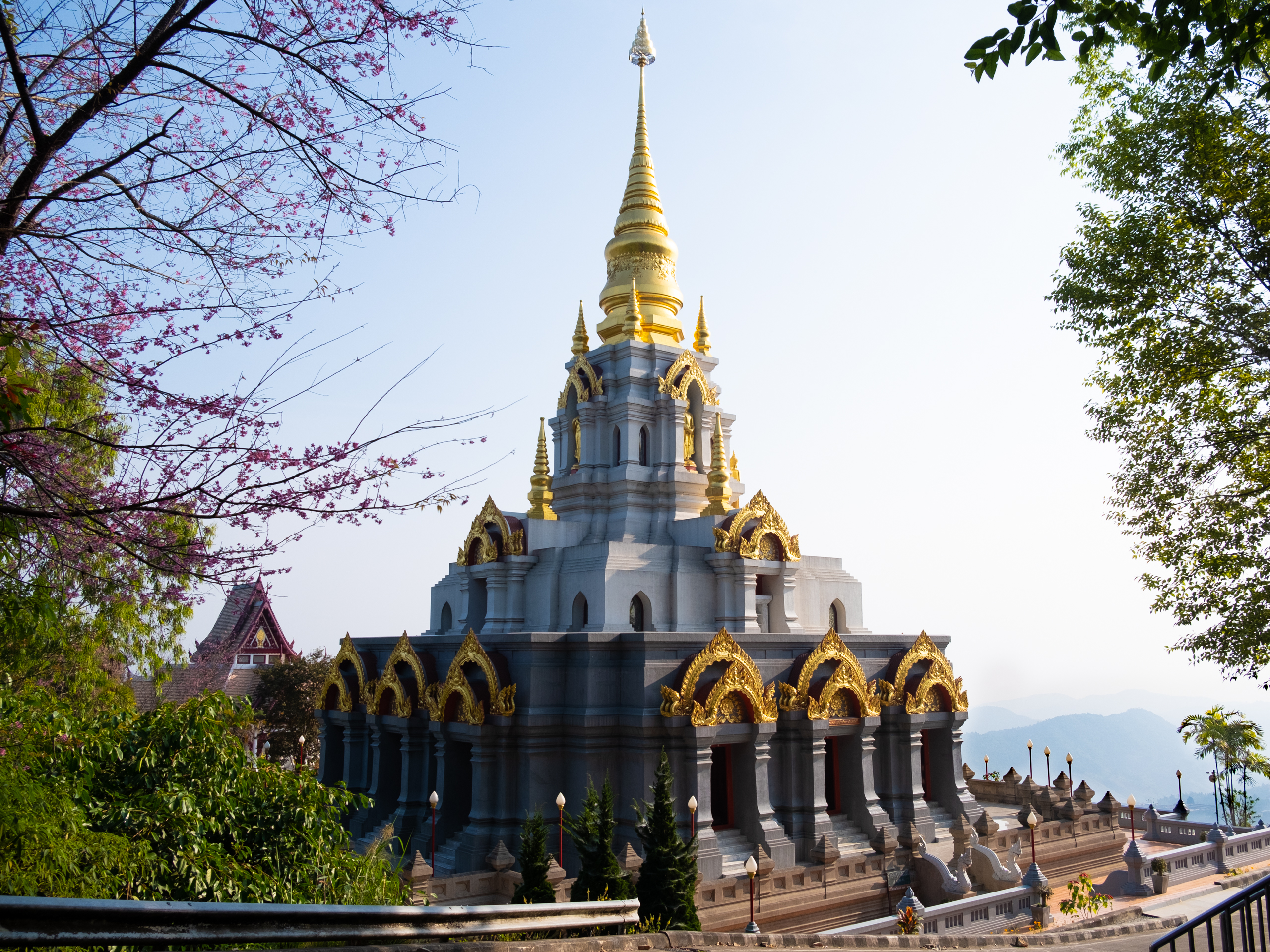
Phra That Srimahapo Mongkol Boonchum

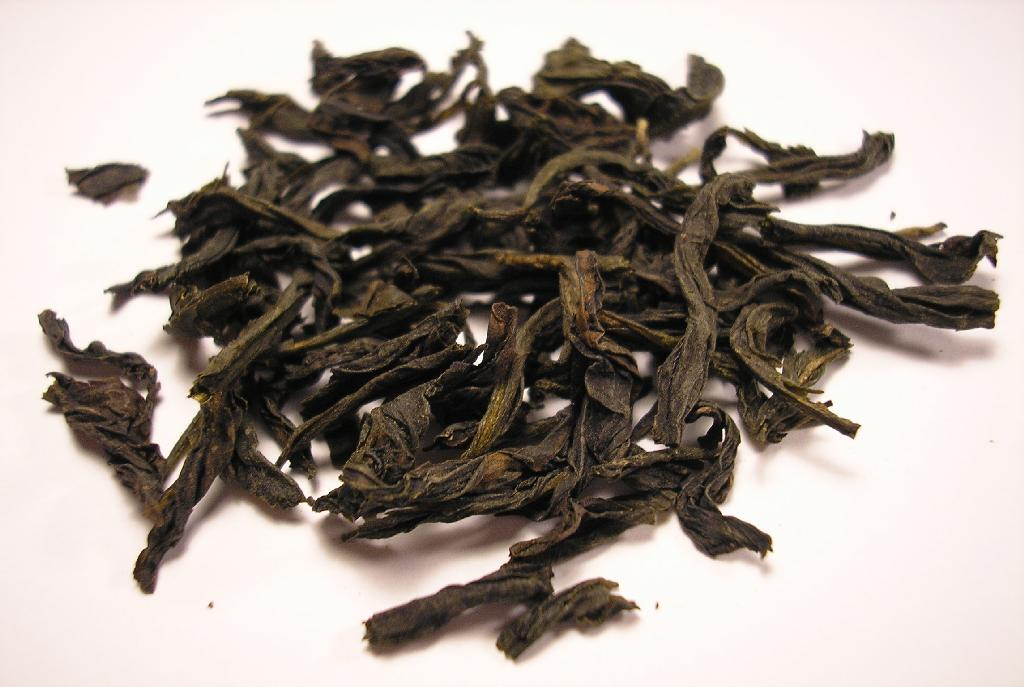
Oolong Tea

=== Temples ===
Prabaromathat Chedi Srinakarindra Satismahasantikiri is located on the top of the highest mountain of Mae Salong at an altitude of 1,500 m. It is an applied Lanna pagoda on a rectangular base, 30 meters high and 15 meters wide on each side with decorative gray tile. There are three arches on each side. The bell is decorated with gold leaf and a carved pattern. It was completed in 1996 to offer royal merit to Princess Srinagarindra. It is the highest point of Doi Mae Salong mountain.

Phra That Srimahapo Mongkol Boonchum is a Thai-Chinese temple that was created by people in Doi Mae Salong with Phra Kru Boonchum on the 60th anniversary of King Bhumibol Adulyadej's reign and 80th birthday that was consecrated on November 5, 2006. Inside the main hall of the temple, there is a Buddha image and Chinese architecture with sculptures inside. It is an applied Lanna pagoda on a rectangular base, approximately 30 meters high and about 15 meters wide on each side. Outside the decorative gray tile, there are three arches on each side. It is decorated with four standing Buddha images, and the bell is decorated with a gold leaf carved pattern.

=== Monuments ===
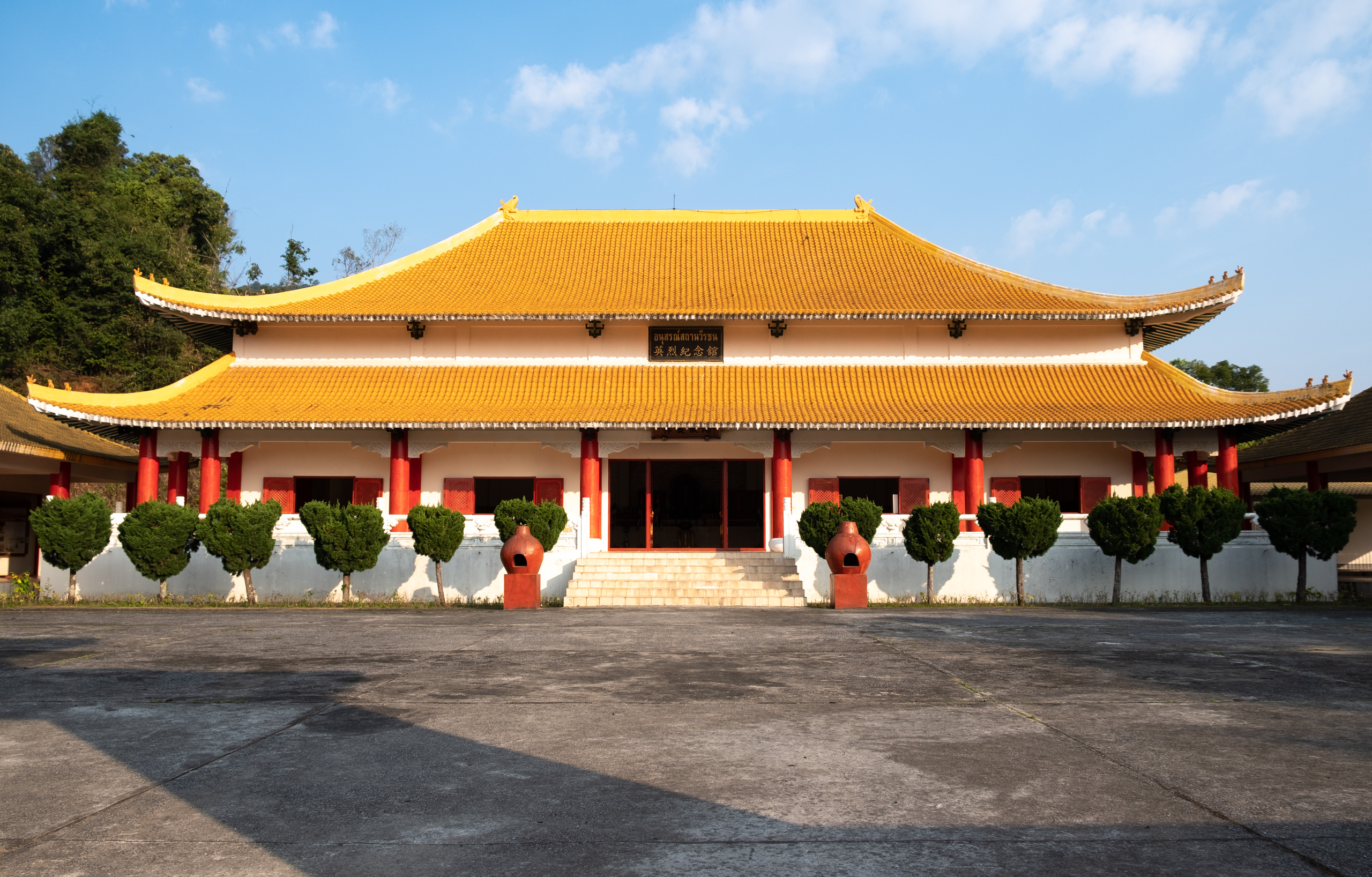
The memorial of Thai-Chinese descent

The memorial of Thai-Chinese descent is built for the Chinese army that helped the Thai government fight and suppress communism in Doi Luang, Doi Khao, and Doi Pha Mon areas, Chiang Rai province in 1971–1985, and Khao Ya area, Phetchabun province in 1981. As a result of the fighting, The Thai government imposed a status on the former Chinese soldiers as a person who made a contribution to Thailand, and they were able to convert to Thai nationality. It is decorated in Chinese architecture. Inside, there are exhibits showing historical photographs depicting the challenges of settling in Thailand, along with a library that houses a collection of pertinent historical information.

Sala Kriangsak and Ban Kriangsak is the place of the administrative division for former tree-needled pine projects. Starting in 1973, General Kringsak initiated a tea planting project by importing tea from Taiwan. Subsequently, efforts were made to cultivate pine trees, and a Chinese pavilion was constructed within a pine forest to serve as the administrative center for the pine planting project, completed in 1975. In 1979, a residence was built to accommodate government officials, and a religious ceremony was held the same year, during which pine trees were planted around the pavilion and the residence. Consequently, the pavilion and the residence were officially named "Sala Kriangsak and Ban Kriangsak" and have been known by these names ever since.

Tuan Cemetery was built in 1980. It is located on the hill above the village at an altitude of approximately 1,300 m. It was built to commemorate the history of the former Chinese soldiers who helped the Thai government to fight and suppress communism in the Doi Luang, Doi Khoa and Doi Pha Mon. Descendants of the Chinese always worship and go to this place every year. This cemetery is located behind Khum Nai Phol resort which can see the view of the village.

=== Natural places ===
- Mae Salong Flower Hill is the garden hill of flowers that people decorate with the word Doi Mae Salong in Thai. It is one of the biggest colorful flower gardens at Doi Mae Salong. It is located in the Doi Mok Dok Mai Resort (Mae Salong Flower Hill Resort). There are souvenir shops and tea shops from the villagers and also Yunnan restaurants.
- Wang Put Tan is a tea plantation and it also has a café that serves tea and cake. It also contains a Yunnan restaurant and a hotel. The Wang Put Tan Tea plantation has three of the world's largest teapots and a gold lion and silver lion. Visitors can see the view of the mountain with tea plantations. This is one of the tea plantations completed.
- Tea Plantation 101 is the most famous tea plantation at Doi Mae Salong and received the Best Tea of the World award. Then fine tea was produced and exported to be distributed around the world. They plant two types of Oolong tea which are three young leaves of No.12 tea and Four Seasons tea.
- The Nang Phaya Sua Krong trees were planted at Doi Mae Salong in 1982, and it is a vernacular tree. Its flower has a light pink color. When it blooms it is like a sakura in Japan; most people call it Sakura Thailand. On the road leading to Doi Mae Salong, the trees are along a distance of more than 4 kilometers and will shed leaves then bloom in early January or winter of every year.

=== Food ===
Doi Mae Salong has many dishes for tourists to try, and the most recommended dishes are part of Yunnan cuisine.

- Mae Salong Market is the biggest market in Doi Mae Salong. It organizes all agricultural products, local tea, local products, and souvenirs.
- Doi Mae Salong Morning Market is a local market that opens in the morning from about 6 am. to 8 am. It has an area of about 300 square meters located against the road. Most sellers and customers are villagers.
- Im Pochana Restaurant is one of the well-known restaurants which serves Yunnan food. The signature dish is pork knuckle in brown sauce with Mantou (Chinese Bun). It is one of the oldest restaurants at Doi Mae Salong.

== Geography ==
Doi Mae Salong is located in the Daen Lao Range, in Chiang Rai province, north of Thailand. It is a high mountain with complex mountain ranges and a plain between the foothills. In the middle, there is a hill and a channel. The height of this hill is about 950–1200 meters from the mean sea level. The area of Mae Salong Nok Subdistrict is around 115.26 square kilometers.

== Climate ==
The weather in Doi Mae Salong is cool all year round. The average temperature is between 15 and 20 degrees Celsius, and the temperature will drop between 4 and 6 degrees Celsius during December–January, which is the coldest in Doi Mae Salong. During April, the hottest season, the temperatures at night are between 25 and 32 degrees Celsius. In the daytime, not too hot or cold during June–November, the temperature is between 15 and 20 degrees Celsius.

== See also ==
- Thai highlands
- List of mountains in Thailand
