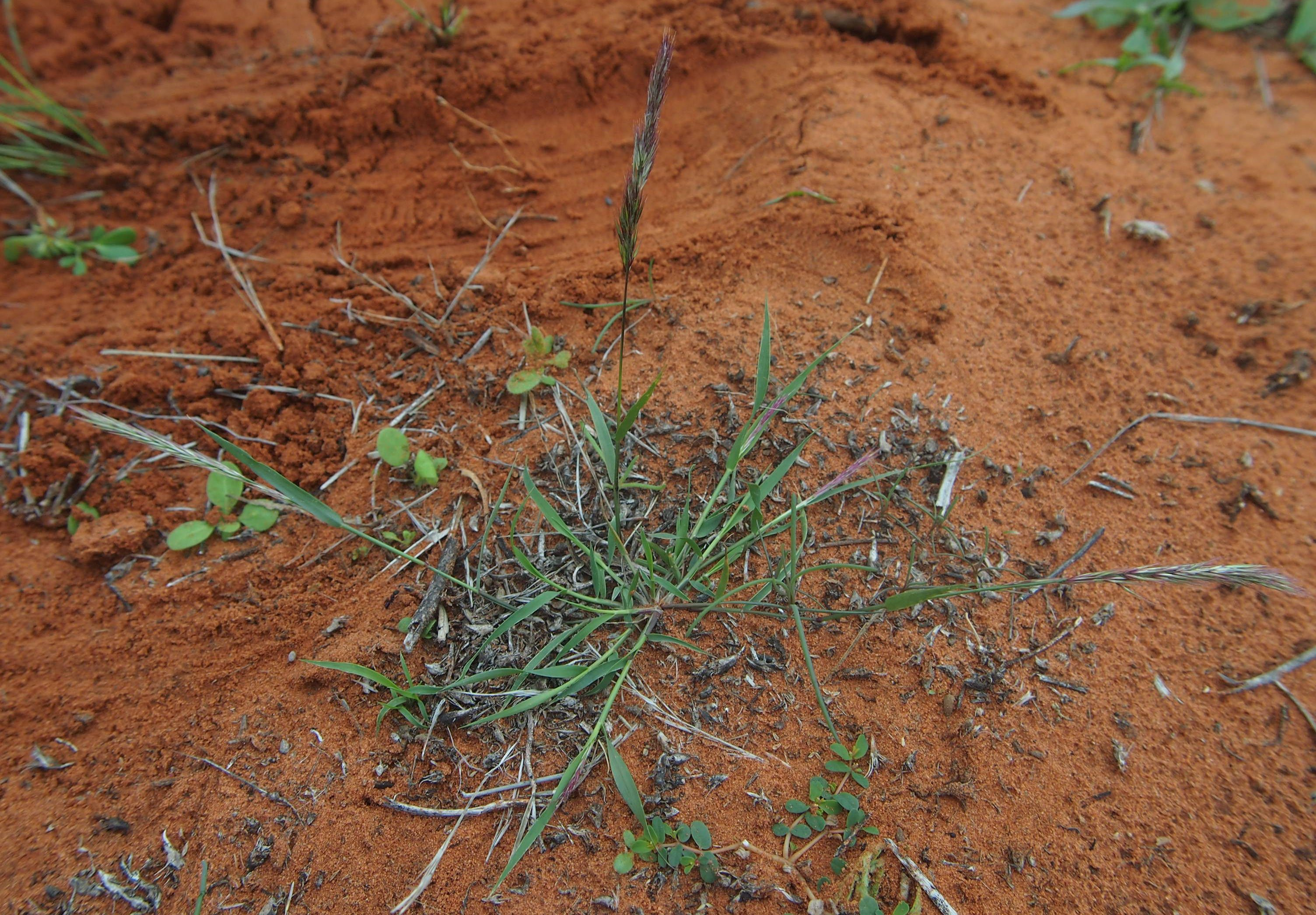
- Triraphis mollis

Scientific classification
- Kingdom: Plantae
- Clade: Tracheophytes
- Clade: Angiosperms
- Clade: Monocots
- Clade: Commelinids
- Order: Poales
- Family: Poaceae
- Subfamily: Chloridoideae
- Tribe: Triraphideae
- Genus: Triraphis; R.Br.

Type species
- Triraphis pungens R.Br.

= Triraphis =

Genus of grasses

Triraphis is a genus of African, Arabian, Australian, and Brazilian plants in the grass family. Needlegrass is a common name for plants in this genus.

Species

- Triraphis andropogonoides (Steud.) E.Phillips, - South Africa, Botswana, Namibia, Lesotho
- Triraphis compacta Cope, - Ethiopia
- Triraphis devia Filg. & Zuloaga, - State of Goiás in Brazil
- Triraphis mollis R.Br., - Australia (Northern Territory plus all states except Tasmania); naturalized in Britain, Belgium, Texas
- Triraphis pumilio R.Br., - Angola, Namibia, Sahara, Arabian Pen
- Triraphis purpurea Hack., - Angola, Namibia, South Africa, Botswana
- Triraphis ramosissima Hack., - Angola, Namibia, South Africa
- Triraphis schinzii Hack., Tanzania, Mozambique, Zambia, Zimbabwe, Angola, Botswana, South Africa, Namibia

formerly included

see Cortaderia Crinipes Eriachne Nematopoa Pentameris Triodia

- Triraphis abyssinica - Crinipes abyssinicus
- Triraphis bromoides - Triodia bromoides
- Triraphis capensis - Pentameris capensis
- Triraphis danthonioides - Triodia danthonioides
- Triraphis diantha - Eriachne triseta
- Triraphis hieronymi - Cortaderia hieronymi
- Triraphis rigidissima - Triodia rigidissima
