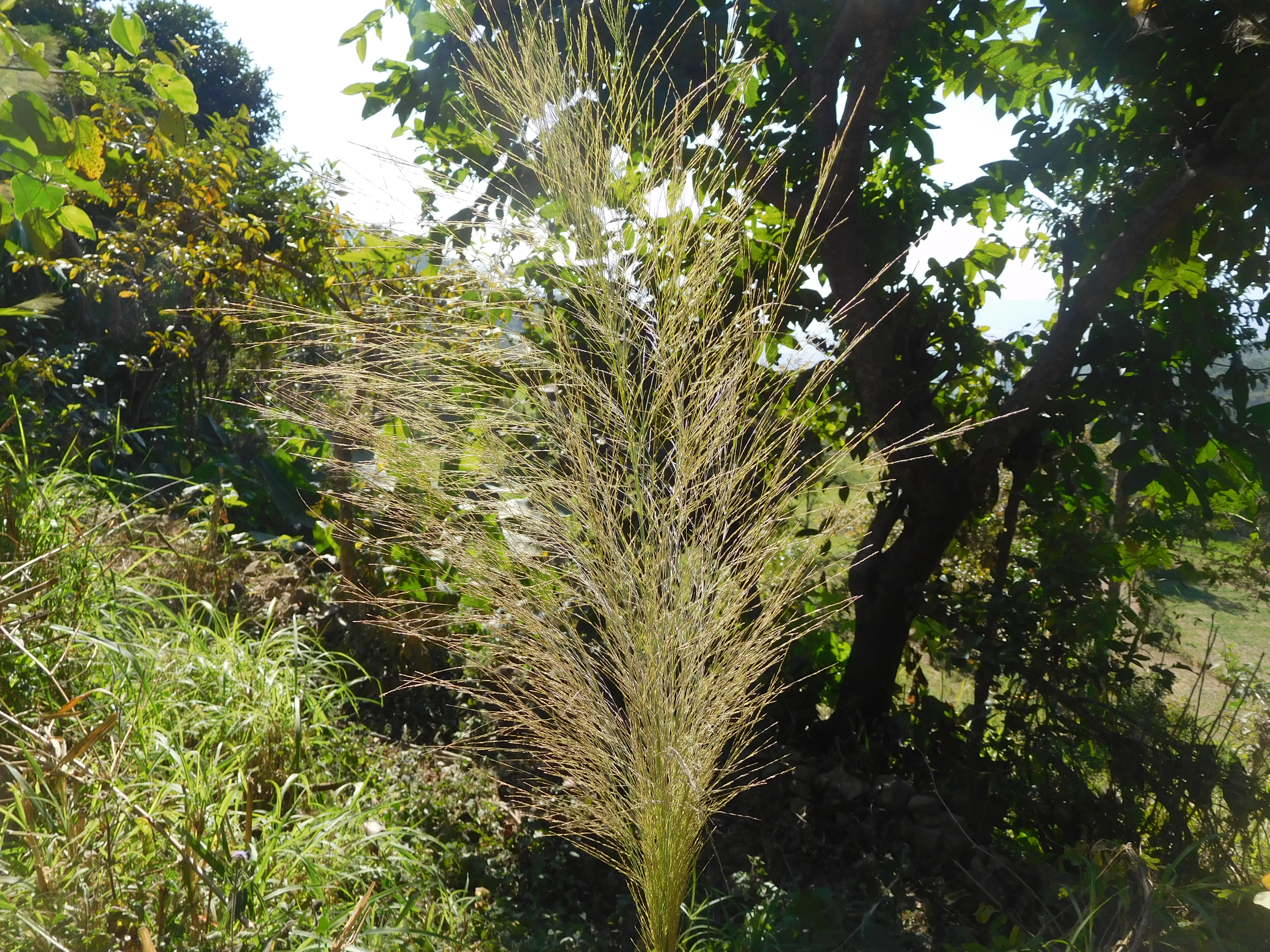
- Amriso plant with flower

Scientific classification
- Kingdom: Plantae
- Clade: Tracheophytes
- Clade: Angiosperms
- Clade: Monocots
- Clade: Commelinids
- Order: Poales
- Family: Poaceae
- Clade: PACMAD clade
- Subfamily: Panicoideae
- Tribe: Thysanolaeneae; C.E.Hubb.
- Genus: Thysanolaena; Nees
- Species: T. latifolia

Binomial name
- Thysanolaena latifolia (Roxb. ex Hornem.) Honda

Synonyms
- Thysano-laena Nees, alternate spelling; Myriachaeta Moritzi; Thysanochlaena Gand.; Thysanolaena acarifera (Trin.) Arn. & Nees; Thysanolaena agrostis Nees; Thysanolaena assamensis Gand.; Thysanolaena birmanica Gand.; Thysanolaena malaccensis Gand.; Thysanolaena maxima (Roxb.) Kuntze; Thysanolaena sikkimensis Gand.; Melica latifolia Roxb. ex Hornem.; Panicum acariferum Trin.; Thysanolaena acarifera Arn. & Nees; Neyraudia acarifera (Roxb. ex Hornem.) Conert; Agrostis maxima Roxb.; Arundo minutiflora Brongn.; Sporobolus scoparius J.Presl; Vilfa scoparia (J.Presl) Steud.; Myriachaeta arundinacea Zoll. & Moritzi; Myriachaeta glauca Moritzi ex Steud.; Vilfa gigas Steud.; Sporobolus gigas (Steud.) Miq.

= Thysanolaena =

Genus of grasses

Thysanolaena is a monotypic genus of the grass family, in the tribe Thysanolaeneae. Its only recognized species is Thysanolaena latifolia (formerly Thysanolaena maxima), native to the Indian subcontinent, Southeast Asia, China (Guangdong, Guangxi, Guizhou, Hainan, Yunnan) and Taiwan. It is also naturalized in Mauritius, Seychelles, Gambia, Tanzania, Hawaii, California, the West Indies and Brazil.

Tiger grass, Nepalese broom grass, broom grass, broom stick are common names for this plant, in Nepali amriso and jhadu in Assamese . The flowers of this plant are used as cleaning tool or broom, which is known as kuchcho in Nepali and jhadu (phool jhadu) in Hindi.

== Habitat ==
It is found growing along steep hills, sandy banks of rivers and damp steep banks along ravines. It is widely distributed throughout Nepal but only up to an altitude of 2000 metres. The grass can be grown on severely degraded and marginal lands. Broom grass tends to grow in tussocks, with 4-5 tussocks in a 100-metre radius and is harvested during the winter seasons between January and March.

== Horticultural use ==
Tiger grass is another common name for this plant throughout the tropics where it is grown as an ornamental. It may be used to create the effect of bamboo, which it resembles. Although both are grasses (Family Poaceae), bamboos are in the subfamily Bambusoideae, while T. latifolia is in the subfamily Panicoideae.

== Growing techniques ==
In order to grow broom grass the slips in the planting site must be clear of weeds and debris. Planting the broom grass slips in fertile soil ensures the best yield. It is usually planted at the beginning of monsoon season during the months of May to June as the soil has the best moisture for plant genesis. One month before planting pits of 30m cubed are dug up and left for weathering. On hilly land the pits should be placed about 1.5 x 2m apart along the contour lines or trace bunds, while on fertile land the best spacing is 2.5m x 2.5m. Farm yard manure and 10% BHC fertilizer at 10 grams per pit are mixed into the pits before planting the seeds. The plant becomes rather low maintenance after planting. The plant requires to be weeded 3-4 times in the first year and annually in the following years. Manure can be applied to the soil during the second weeding to provide the best yields in the first year. The pits need to be fenced off to protect the plants from grazing.

== Harvesting ==
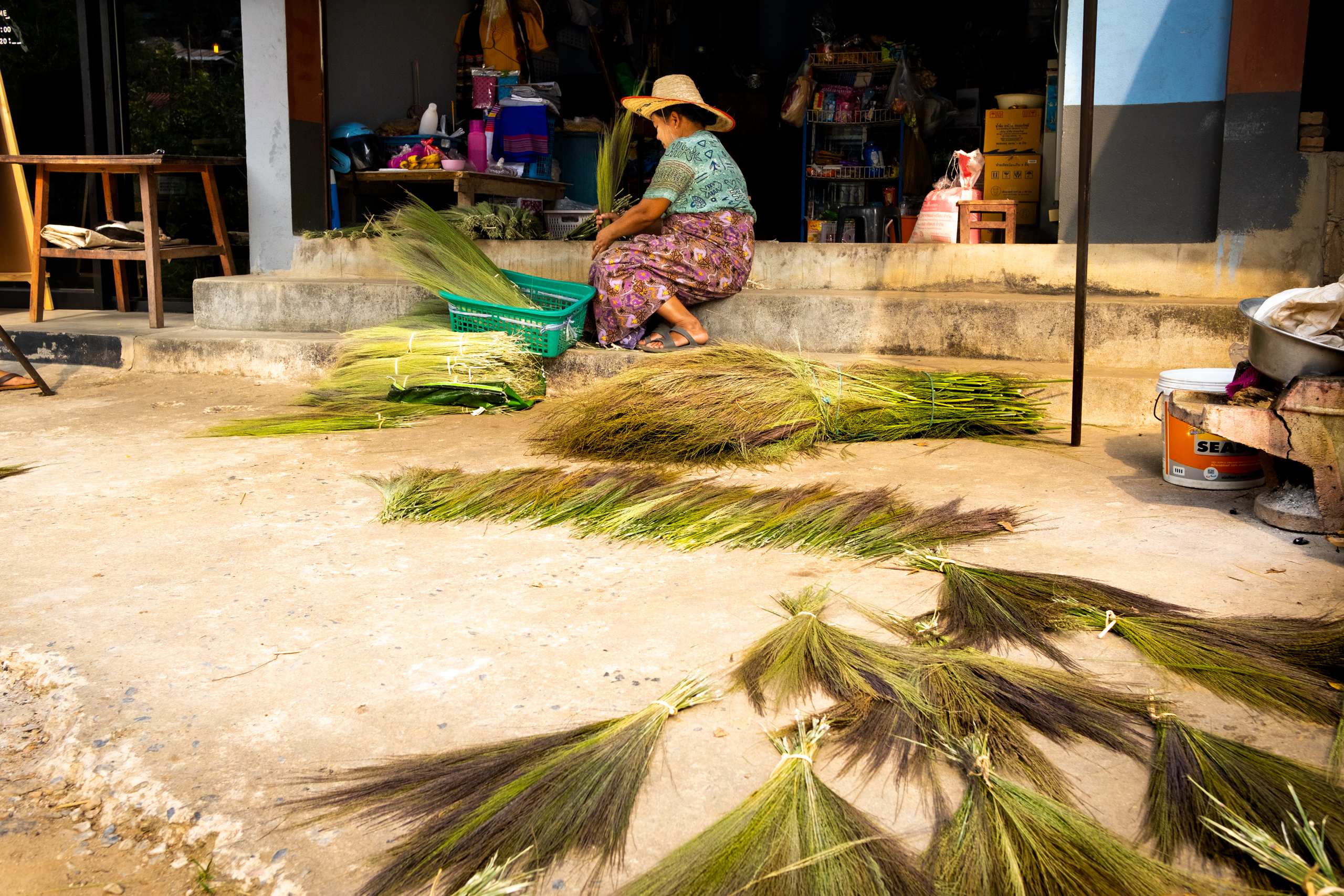
A Shan lady in Thoet Thai, northern Thailand, prepares the dried flowers of the broom grass for making brooms

The mature panicles which turn light green or red are harvested in the winter season from January to March. The timing of the harvest is essential as if the plant is harvested prematurely (5–7 days) their production declines, while if it harvested late it will begin to wilt. The panicles are either harvested by cutting above the soil separating the panicle for stem or pulling the panicles out by hand. It is important to make sure the young sprouts are not damaged or the plants uprooted during harvest. The yield will be the lowest in the first and fifth year with the highest in the third.

== Benefits for Nepal ==
Broom grass is a significant source of income for subsistence communities, primarily for the women who collect it to manufacture and sell them as brooms across Nepal. In addition to providing cash income when sold as brooms the plant provides a variety of uses to the farmers such as, the leaves provide green forage for livestock, the roots promote soil conservation, and the dried up stems can be used as stakes to support growing vegetables. Broom grass has had a direct impact in preventing frequent landslides, helping retain ground moisture and fertility, and improving soil quality by reducing soil erosion. Broom grass has the ability to crowd out invasive species when intercropped and is beneficial in retaining soil nutrients to regrow vegetation. The grass also possesses numerous medicinal properties that are essential in subsistence communities.

== Environmental sustainability ==
The planting of Nepalese broom grass has a direct impact on preventing surface soil erosion on steep hillsides. Broom grass grows in clumps and has many tangled up roots that grow to about one metre below the ground. This makes it highly effective in preventing soil erosion on hillsides as the grass is less likely to fall compared to other plants and trees that would have been planted there. The roots and leaves of the plant slow down water drops and the flow of water after heavy rain by absorbing the water in the soil. Growing broom grass on degraded land has been proven to help rehabilitate it as it helps retain ground moisture and promote fertility. There is no irrigation required to grow the grass and it does not produce any wastewater. No external inputs or energy is needed to grow the plant as it only requires human labour, which can be extensive in the first year of growing. Broom grass farming is highly recommended in new shifting cultivation systems on marginal lands to repair the damage from previous slash and burn methods.

== Impact on promoting local biodiversity ==
The start of Nepalese farmers growing broom grass has increased the local biodiversity in the communities. Now that the farmers have to tie up their livestock since they feed on the broom grass, other plant species in the area can successfully regrow and multiply. Broom grass that have been planted in areas where slash and burn cultivation took place has caused tree stumps to grow branches and other vegetation to grow back. Endangered animals such as the barking deer and monkey are now reappearing in the infertile slash and burn areas where they once lived, as the broom grass used to rehabilitate the soil helps promote the growth of other vegetation the animals use for food. Broom grass does not compete for land with cereal crops so they can be grown simultaneously.

== Gender impacts ==
The farming of broom grass has had a sincere impact on the women in the communities. It has helped women become more empowered by raising their financial status and lessening the burden of other tasks. Females in the communities perform 70 percent of the labour required for the cultivation and manufacturing of the brooms. Women’s efforts to promote broom grass farming has been very important as they have started pressuring males of the family to grow the plant after seeing the income potential it has. Women carry the responsibility of the tedious tasks of collecting firewood for cooking and fodder for animals, which can be eliminated with broom grass as the plants stocks provide firewood and the leaves provide fodder. Even though women have the added task of harvesting broom grass, it is much preferred over searching for firewood and fodder.

== See also ==
- Neyraudia reynaudiana, formerly Thysanolaena mezii
- Eriochloa procera, formerly Thysanolaena procera
