= Mae Fah Luang =

Mae Fa(h) Luang (Thai: แม่ฟ้าหลวง, English : Royal Mother from the sky) may refer to:

- Chiang Rai International Airport, Chiang Rai, Thailand
- Mae Fah Luang University, Chiang Rai Province, Thailand
- Amphoe Mae Fa Luang, Chiang Rai Province, Thailand
- Srinagarindra (1900 – 1995), a member of the Thai Royal Family
