= Triraphis devia =

Scientific classification
- Kingdom: Plantae
- Clade: Tracheophytes
- Clade: Angiosperms
- Clade: Monocots
- Clade: Commelinids
- Order: Poales
- Family: Poaceae
- Subfamily: Chloridoideae
- Genus: Triraphis
- Species: T. devia

Binomial name
- Triraphis devia Filg. & Zuloaga

Species of grass

Triraphis devia is a species of grass endemic to Brazil, the only member of its genus native to the Western Hemisphere. Of the 7 other recognized species, 6 are from Africa,1 from Australia.

Three populations of Triraphis devia has been reported, all from the State of Goiás. One of these lies inside Chapada dos Veadeiros National Park.

Triraphis devia is a perennial herb with an unbranched flowering stalk bearing a panicle less than 8 cm long. These characters alone are enough to distinguish the species from others in the genus. Internal anatomy is consistent with the likelihood that the plant has Krantz anatomy. In other words, this is probably a C_{4} plant, having a photosynthetic metabolism improving efficiency in hot, sunlit environments.
