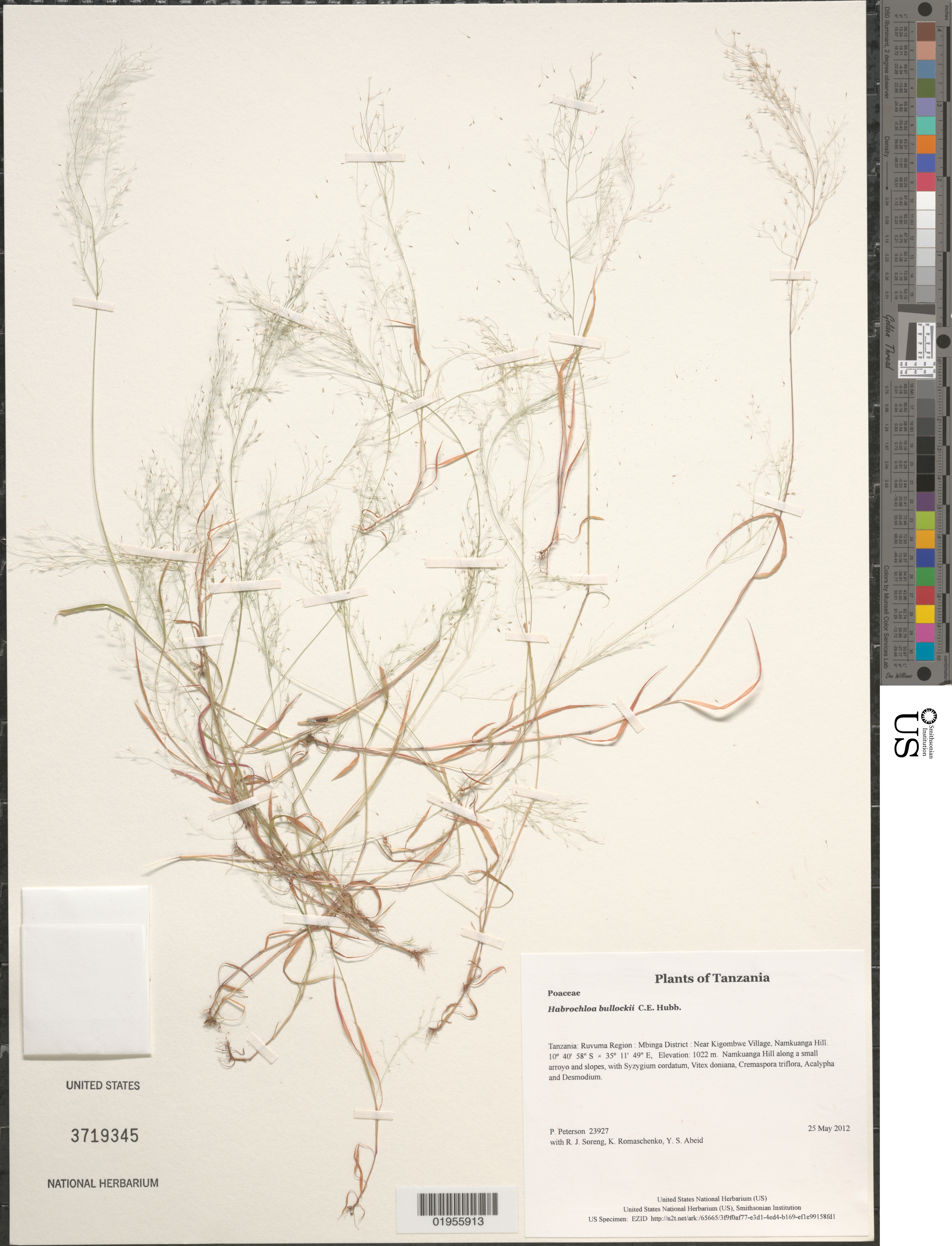

Scientific classification
- Kingdom: Plantae
- Clade: Embryophytes
- Clade: Tracheophytes
- Clade: Spermatophytes
- Clade: Angiosperms
- Clade: Monocots
- Clade: Commelinids
- Order: Poales
- Family: Poaceae
- Subfamily: Chloridoideae
- Tribe: Triraphideae
- Genus: Habrochloa; C.E.Hubb.
- Species: H. bullockii

Binomial name
- Habrochloa bullockii C.E.Hubb.

= Habrochloa =

Genus of grasses

Habrochloa is a genus of African plants in the grass family. The only known species is Habrochloa bullockii native to Cameroon, Tanzania, Malawi, Zambia, and Zimbabwe.
