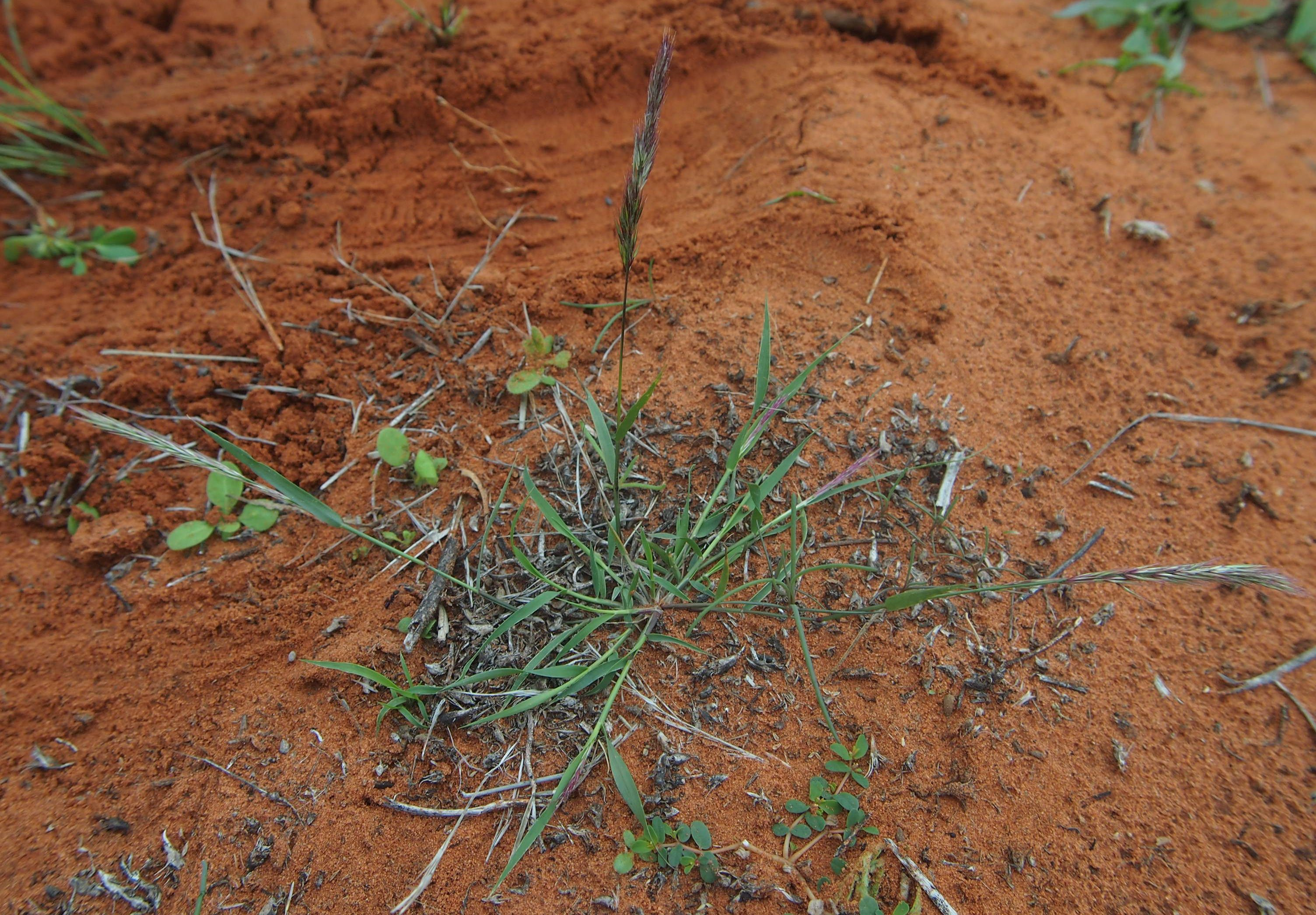
- Triraphis mollis

Scientific classification
- Kingdom: Plantae
- Clade: Tracheophytes
- Clade: Angiosperms
- Clade: Monocots
- Clade: Commelinids
- Order: Poales
- Family: Poaceae
- Clade: PACMAD clade
- Subfamily: Chloridoideae
- Tribe: Triraphideae; P.M. Peterson (2010)

Genera
- See text.

Synonyms
- Triraphidinae Stapf (1917)

= Triraphideae =

Tribe of grasses

Triraphideae is a small tribe of tropical grasses, containing about 15 species in three or four genera. Like most of the subfamily Chloridoideae, species in the tribe use the C_{4} photosynthetic pathway.

== Genera ==
Three genera were included in a 2015 classification of the Poaceae:

- Habrochloa C.E.Hubb.
- Neyraudia Hook.f.
- Triraphis R.Br.

As of April 2024, GRIN Taxonomy included a fourth genus:

- Nematopoa C.E.Hubb.
