= Mae Salong =

Village in Chiang Rai province, Thailand

Coordinates: 20°09′56″N 99°37′35″E

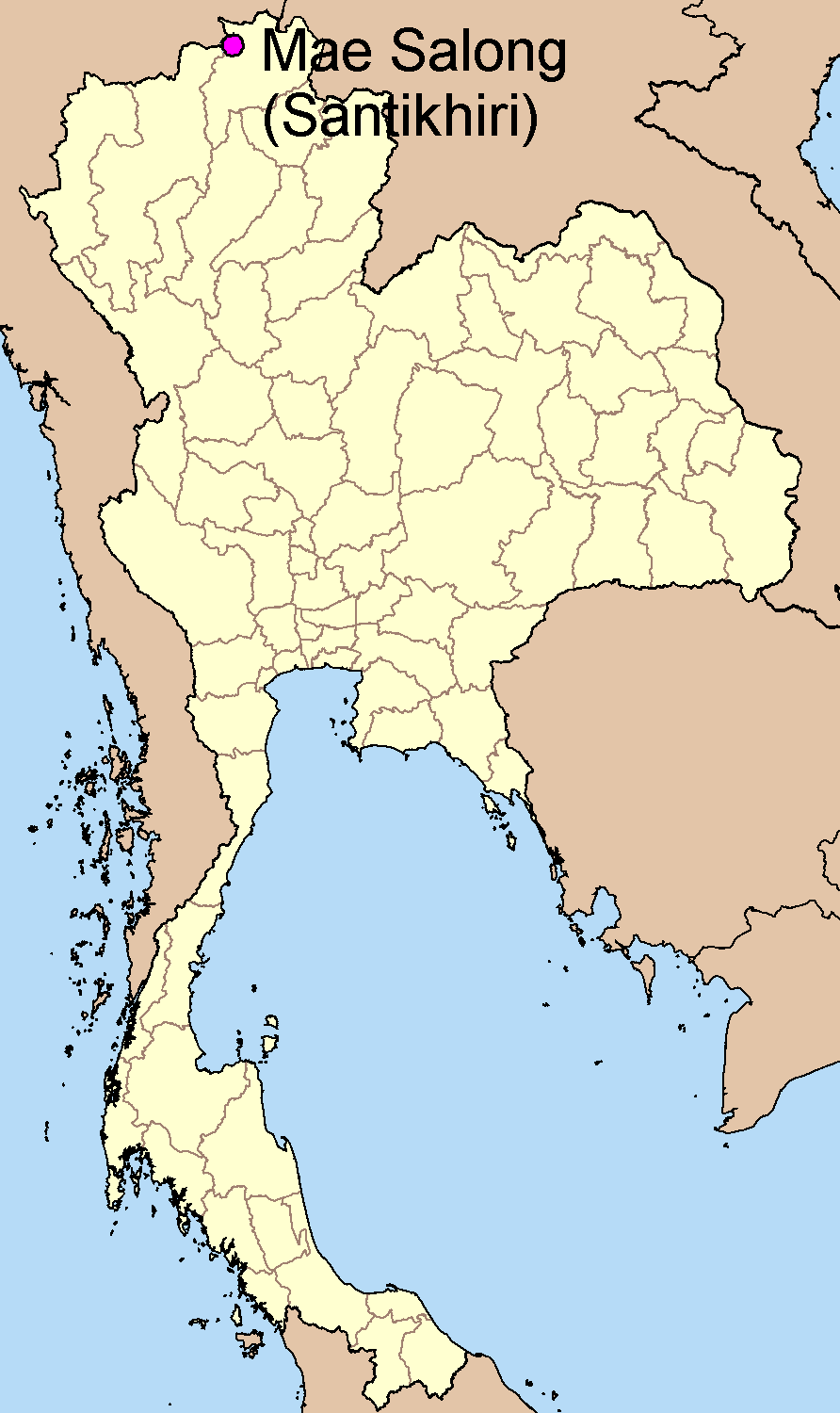
Location of Mae Salong, straddling the border between Myanmar and Thailand

Mae Salong (Thai: แม่สลอง, simplified Chinese: 美斯乐; traditional Chinese: 美斯樂; pinyin: Měisīlè), officially known as Santikhiri (Thai: สันติคีรี), is a village in the Thai highlands on Doi Mae Salong mountain of the Daen Lao Range, in Mae Fa Luang District, Chiang Rai Province, the northernmost province of Thailand. The area has an alpine-like landscape and climate, and is known for its hill tribe villages, tea plantations, and cherry blossoms.

Mae Salong's early history centered on the Golden Triangle's opium trade, in which its distinctive population – the "lost army" of the Republic of China Army's 93rd Division – became involved. At the conclusion of the Chinese Civil War in 1949, some remnants of the anti-communist Kuomintang (KMT) forces refused to surrender, including the 278th Regiment of the 93rd Division and the 709th Regiment of the 237th Division (led by General Li Kuo-hui). The troops fought their way out of Yunnan in south-western China, and its soldiers lived in Burma's (now Myanmar) jungles. The army grew and part of it returned to Taiwan under international pressure. The remaining troops moved to the Thai border area and eventually established several communities in Thailand. Those led by Gen Tuan Shi-wen (also known as Chiwan Khamlue) settled in Mae Salong. The Thai government allowed their presence in exchange for their help fighting the communist insurgency on the Thai frontier. In reward, the Thai government granted citizenship to most of the KMT soldiers and their families.

Cash crops, especially tea, have now replaced the growing of opium poppies, and Mae Salong today is a tourist attraction known as "Little Switzerland".

== History ==
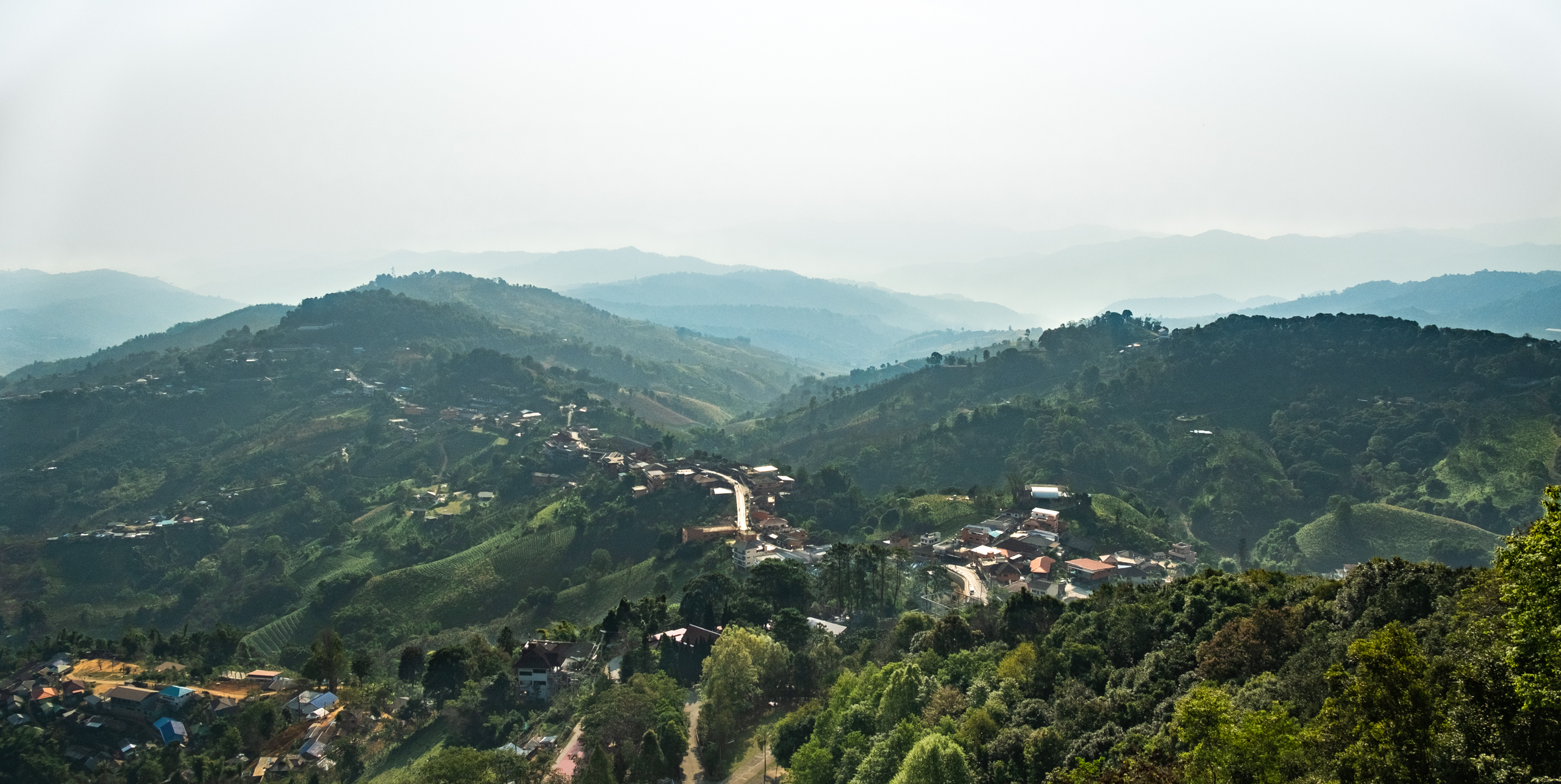
The hilltop village of Santikhiri on the mountain of Doi Mae Salong, January 2019

The origins of the Mae Salong community go back to the end of the Chinese Civil War. In October 1949, after Mao Zedong's communist party victory in China, the defeated Kuomintang (KMT) armies led by Generalissimo Chiang Kai-shek retreated to Taiwan, except for the 3rd and 5th Regiments of the 93rd Division, which refused to surrender. Fighting between the communist and KMT troops continued in some remote parts of China, including Yunnan in the south-west. When the communists marched into the provincial capital of Kunming in January 1950, 12,000 troops from the 3rd and 5th Regiments, commanded respectively by Generals Lee Wen-huan (Li Wenhuan) and Tuan Shi-wen, fought their way out of Yunnan and escaped into Burma's jungles.

The soldiers' war did not end after their own "long march" from Yunnan to Möng Hsat in Burma's Shan State. The Burmese soon discovered that a foreign army was camped on their soil, and launched an offensive. The fighting continued for 12 years, and several thousand KMT soldiers were eventually evacuated to Taiwan. When China entered the Korean War, the Central Intelligence Agency (CIA) had a desperate need for intelligence on China. The agency turned to the two KMT generals, who agreed to slip some soldiers back into China for intelligence-gathering missions. In return, the agency offered arms to equip the generals to retake China from their bases in the Shan State. The KMT army tried no fewer than seven times between 1950 and 1952 to invade Yunnan, but was repeatedly driven back into the Shan State. The ending of the Korean War in 1953 was not the end of the KMT's fight against the communist Chinese and Burmese armies, which continued for many years, supported by Washington and Taiwan and subsequently funded by the KMT's involvement in the Golden Triangle's drug trade.

=== Refuge in Thailand ===
In 1961, Tuan led some 4,000 battle-weary KMT troops out of Burma to a mountainous sanctuary in Mae Salong in Thailand. The Thai government allowed them to stay on the understanding that they would assist in policing the area against communist infiltration. As a result, most of the village's inhabitants today are ethnic Chinese and direct descendants of those KMT soldiers. At the same time, General Lee of the 3rd Regiment established his headquarters at Tham Ngob, north-west of Chiang Mai. The KMT army was renamed "Chinese Irregular Forces" (CIF) and was placed directly under the control of a special task force, code-named "04", commanded by Bangkok.

After the soldiers reached Mae Salong, China and Thailand struck an agreement to transfer the administration of the group to the Thai government. The provincial governor of southern Thailand, Pryath Samanmit, was reassigned as the governor of Chiang Rai, to oversee the KMT division, but upon taking up his position, Samanmit was killed by communist insurgents. Soon afterwards, the KMT division was ordered to assist the Thai government in countering the advancing armies on Thailand's northern borders and the internal threat from the Communist Party of Thailand. Fierce battles were fought in the mountains of Doi Laung, Doi Yaw, Doi Phamon, and Mae Aabb, and the communist uprising was successfully countered. The bloodiest operation was launched on 10 December 1970, a five-year-long campaign that claimed over 1,000 lives, many from landmines. It was not until 1982 that the soldiers were able to give up their arms and were discharged to settle down to a normal life at Mae Salong. As a reward for their service, the Thai government gave citizenship to most of the KMT soldiers and their families.

Despite the Thai government's attempts to integrate the KMT division and their families into the Thai nation, the inhabitants of Mae Salong preferred for many years to engage in the illegal opium trade, alongside the drug warlord Khun Sa of the Shan United Army. In 1967, Tuan said in an interview with a British journalist:

We have to continue to fight the evil of communism, and to fight you must have an army, and an army must have guns, and to buy guns you must have money. In these mountains, the only money is opium.

— Gen Tuan Shi-wen, Weekend Telegraph (London), 10 March 1967

According to a CIA report in 1971, Mae Salong was then one of the largest heroin refineries in south-east Asia. Only in the late 1980s, after Khun Sa's army was finally routed and pushed over the border into Myanmar by the Thai military, was the Thai government able to make any headway in taming the region – part of which involved crop substitution plans and giving the area a new name. Santikhiri meaning "hill of peace" was introduced by the Thai government in an effort to disassociate the area from its former image as an established opium zone. King Bhumibol Adulyadej and other members of the royal family made regular visits as a sign of their support for the old soldiers who had fought against their own country for Thailand.

=== Mae Salong today ===
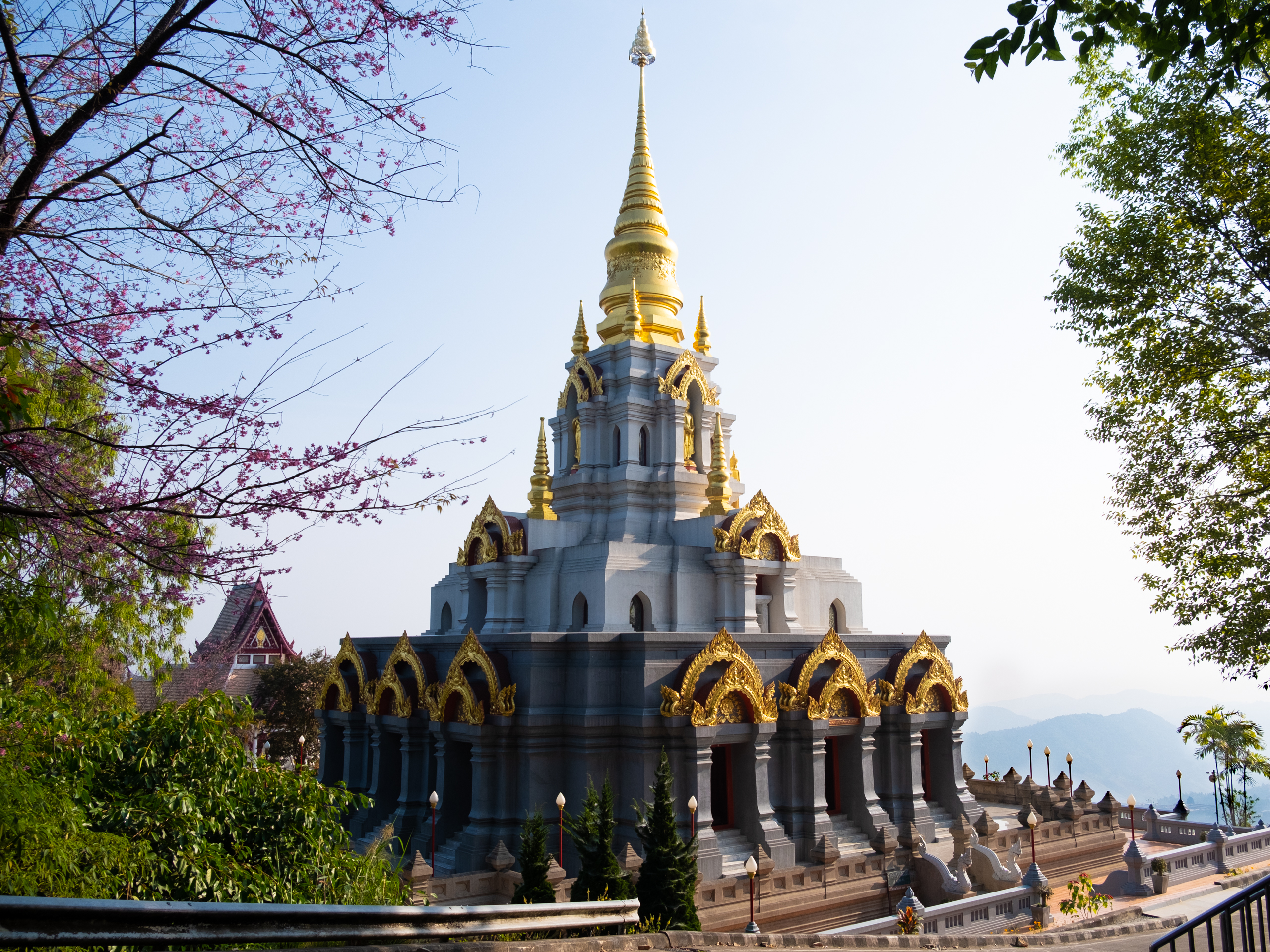
The Phra Boromathat Chedi

As late as the mid-1970s, Doi Mae Salong was strictly off-limits to outsiders. Since 1994, Mae Salong has capitalised on its unique history and has developed into a tourist attraction, with its narrow winding streets lined with inns, noodle shops and teashops. As a result, Mae Salong has become one of Thailand's top ten destinations among backpackers today. The former soldiers had settled down, some of them having married ethnic Chinese brides who crossed the border after the fighting stopped, and others having married local Thais. The old soldiers carry on their normal lives peacefully now, but still retain their Chinese identity; the main language spoken remains Yunnanese. Among their local-born descendants, some have adopted a Thai identity and no longer identify with their Chinese ancestry. As of 2007, General Lue Ye-tien, aged 90 and Tuan's former right-hand man, is the leader of the group, after taking over the leadership on Tuan's death in 1980.

The crop substitution programs successfully encouraged the cultivation of tea, coffee, corn, and fruit trees, replacing the opium poppies that had previously been grown. New fruit orchards and tea factories were also set up, followed by production facilities for fruit wines and Chinese herbs, which are particularly popular among Thais and tourists from China, Taiwan, and other ethnic Chinese communities in south-east Asia.

Mae Salong was chosen as the filming location for the subplot The Fortitude of the Buddha in the 2005 film 3 Needles. Although the narrative is supposed to be set in the rural southern province of Yunnan, director Thom Fitzergald stated that difficulties in obtaining permission from the Censorship Authority resulted in the decision to shoot the segment in Mae Salong instead. The segment, which stars Lucy Liu as a heavily pregnant blood merchant, depicts the blood-selling scandals in China from the 1980s-2000s in which hundreds of thousands of people, mostly rural poor, contracted HIV through government sponsored campaigns to increase blood supplies. The traditional costume of the Akha people features heavily in the segment, however the blood selling scandals mostly impacted rural villagers in Henan province.

== Geography and climate ==
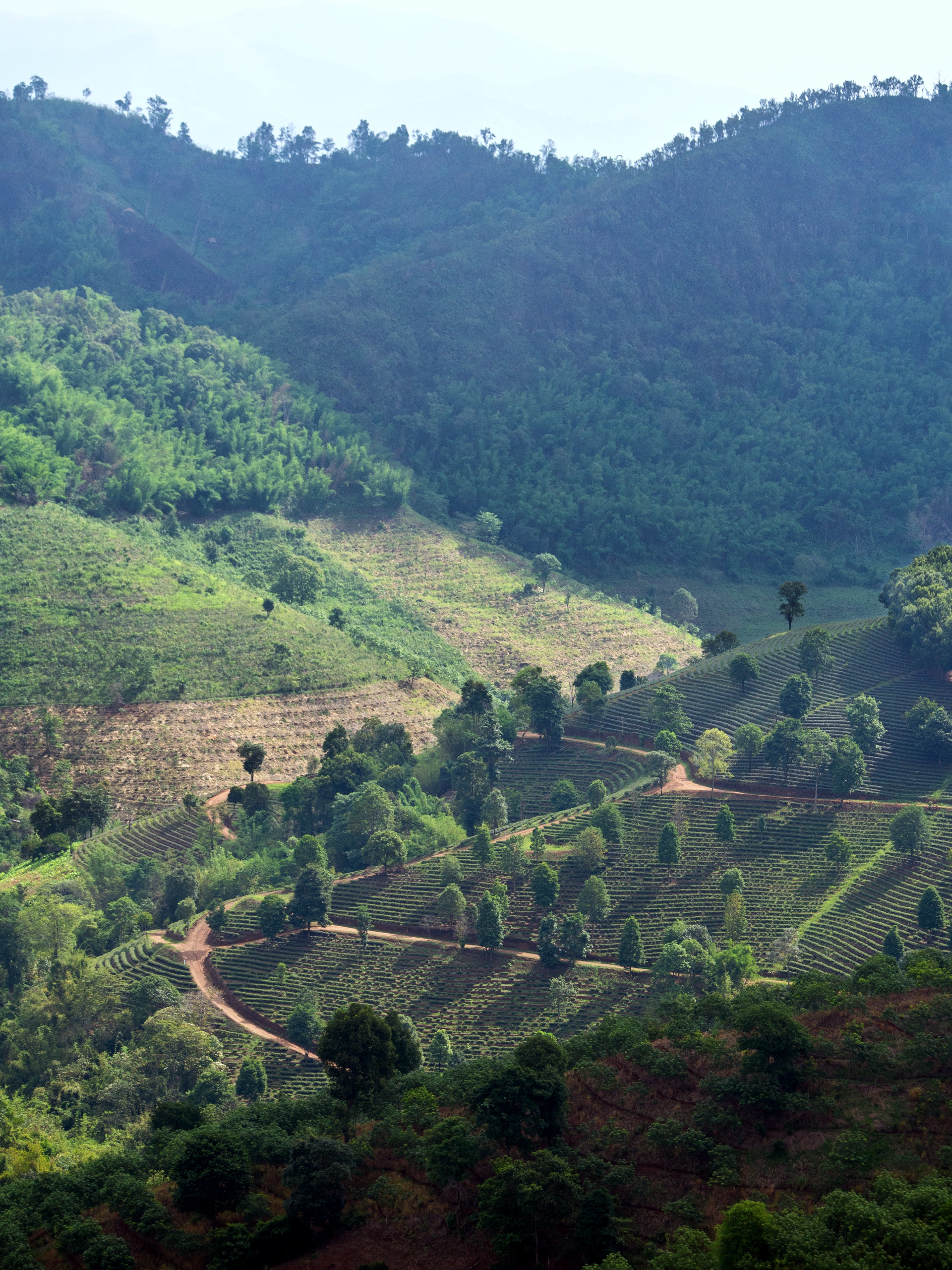
Tea plantations surround the village.

Mae Salong is a hilltop village in the Mae Fa Luang district of Thailand's Chiang Rai Province, about 80 kilometres (50 mi) from Chiang Rai. Mae Salong is on the highest peak of the Doi Mae Salong range of mountains, at an elevation of 1,134 metres (3,722 ft) above sea level. It has an alpine-like climate, with crisp cool air all year round and chilly in the winter months of November through February. Mae Salong is accessible via two routes – Route 1130 from Ban Basang and Route 1234 from the south, which until being paved were only accessible by pack horses. Now regular minibus services, running from 06:00–13:00, are available from Chiang Rai to Mae Salong.

Mae Salong has long been the home of many hill tribes such as the Akha, Yao, Karen, and Hmong that originated from southern China and Myanmar. Each tribe has its own language, and follows animist customs and practices. Living among the native inhabitants are the ethnic Chinese, who form the majority of Mae Salong's estimated population of 20,000.

== Landmarks and attractions ==
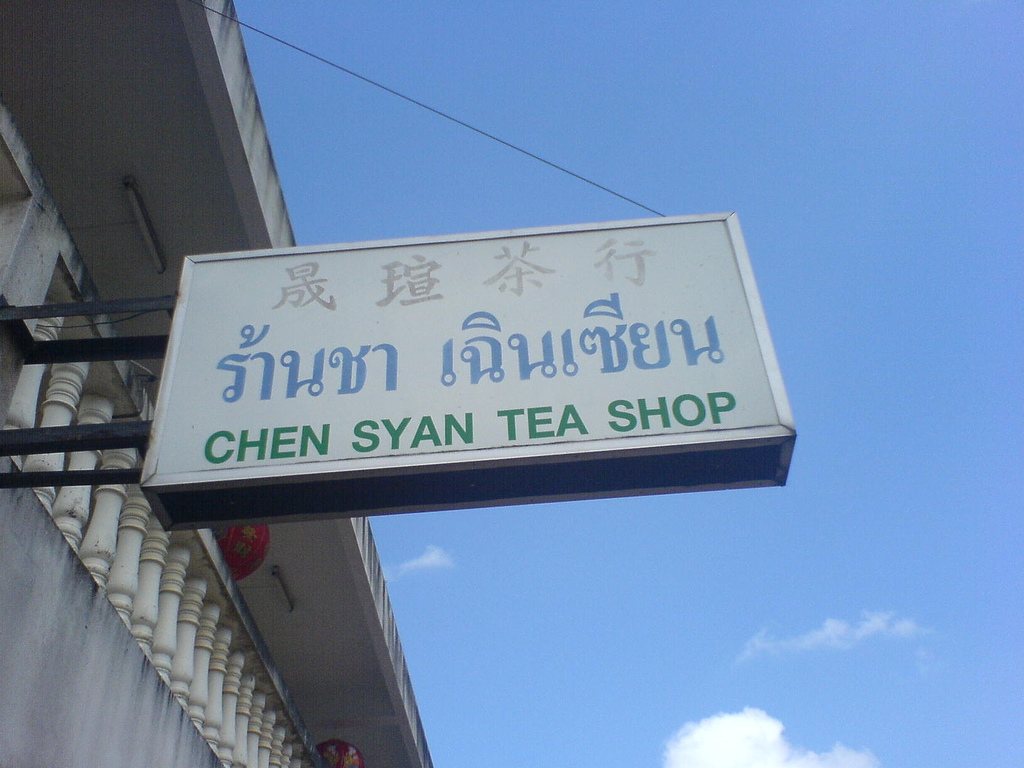
Tea shops like this are commonly found in Mae Salong

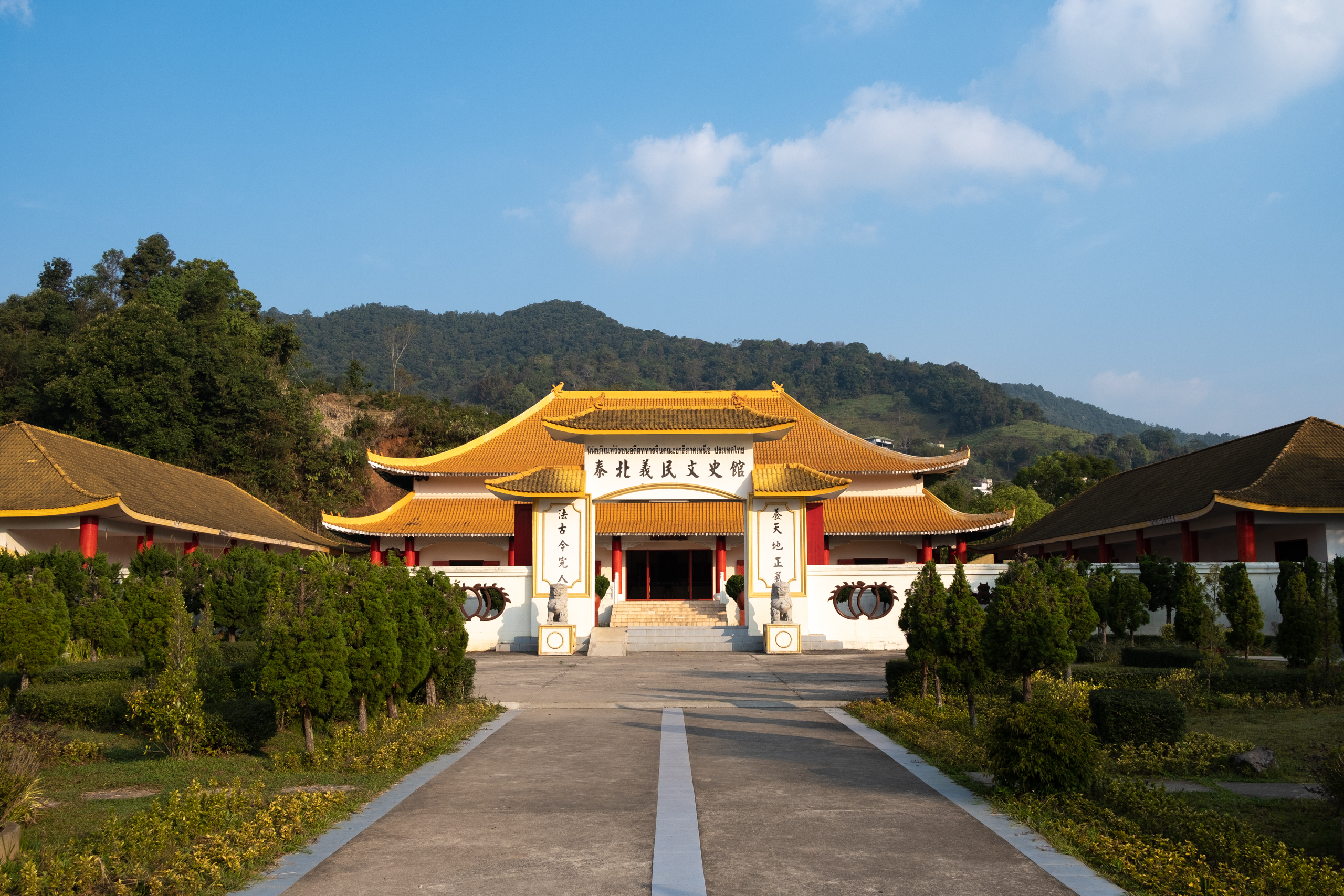
The Martyrs' Memorial Hall

Mae Salong is noted for its high mountain oolong, a high-grade traditional Chinese tea, which makes up about 80% of all tea production in Chiang Rai. The province produces about 200 tonnes (200 long tons; 220 short tons) of tea a year. The combination of climate and soil conditions at Mae Salong is ideal for growing high quality oolongs ("black dragon" in Chinese). Such teas are cultivated at elevations ranging from 1,200 to 1,400 metres (3,960–4,620 ft). In 2005, Mae Salong was selected by the Tourism and Sports Ministry as an OTOP ("One Tambon One Product") tourism village in recognition of its fine oolong tea. The goals are to stimulate the grassroots economy, increase the number of tourists, and develop Thailand's products and services. Taiwanese experts work alongside local farmers in tea processing plants which produce top-quality tea for both the local and export markets. The number of tea plantations in the village has increased significantly since the mid-1990s, and includes Choke Chamroen Tea, Wang Put Tan, and 101 Tea.

From 28 December to 2 January each year, Mae Salong hosts the annual cherry blossoms festival, which is organised by Mae Salong Nok Tambon Administration Organisation in association with Mae Fa Luang District. The festival celebrates the culture of the hill tribe people from the Chiang Rai area, and includes a handicraft sale, a light and sound show, a parade by the tribespeople, and a beauty contest.

General Tuan Shi-wen died in 1980, and was buried in a pagoda-like tomb on a hilltop reached via a 300-metre (984 ft) climb. From the top, there is a panoramic view of the village. There is also a memorial to the KMT soldiers who died in their fight against communism, The Martyrs' Memorial, a museum whose wooden panels bear the names of the dead, set on an altar in the main building. It was constructed in the style of a large Chinese shrine like the National Revolutionary Martyrs' Shrine in Taipei. The museum also features exhibits describing the struggles of the KMT soldiers and the development of the Doi Mae Salong valley.

Phra Boromathat Chedi is a chedi built on a hill near the village, in honour of the late Princess Mother, Srinagarindra. There is an excellent view of the Myanmar frontier from the top, an area that was off-limits when it was under the control of the warlord Khun Sa.

== See also ==
- Kuomintang in Burma
- Mae Sai
