= Mae Fa Luang subdistrict =

Mae Fa Luang แม่ฟ้าหลวง
- Tambon
- Interactive map of Mae Fa Luang
- Coordinates: 20°16′10″N 99°48′16″E
- Country: Thailand
- Province: Chiang Rai
- Amphoe: Mae Fa Luang

Population (2020)
  - Total: 12,828
- Time zone: UTC+7 (TST)
- Postal code: 57240
- TIS 1099: 571504

Mae Fa Luang (Thai: แม่ฟ้าหลวง) is a tambon (subdistrict) of Mae Fa Luang District, in Chiang Rai Province, Thailand. In 2020 it had a total population of 12,828 people.

== History ==
The subdistrict was created effective November 16, 1995 by splitting off 12 administrative villages from Thoet Thai.

== Administration ==
=== Central administration ===
The tambon is subdivided into 19 administrative villages (muban).

No.	Name	Thai
1.	Ban Huai Nam Khun	บ้านห้วยน้ำขุ่น
2.	Ban Huai Rai Samakkhi	บ้านห้วยไร่สามัคคี
3.	Ban Pa Kha	บ้านป่าคา
4.	Ban Si Lang	บ้านสี่หลัง
5.	Ban Kha Yaeng Phatthana	บ้านขาแหย่งพัฒนา
6.	Ban Musoe Pa Khluai	บ้านมูเซอป่ากล้วย
7.	Ban Akha Pa Khluai	บ้านอาข่าป่ากล้วย
8.	Ban La Ba	บ้านลาบา
9.	Ban Liche	บ้านลิเช
10.	Ban Chalo	บ้านจะลอ
11.	Ban Samakkhi Kao	บ้านสามัคคีเก่า
12.	Ban Pa Sang Na Ngoen	บ้านป่าซางนาเงิน
13.	Ban Samakkhi Mai	บ้านสามัคคีใหม่
14.	Ban Suan Pa	บ้านสวนป่า
15.	Ban Pang Phra Ratchathan	บ้านปางพระราชทาน
16.	Ban Pa Yang Musoe	บ้านป่ายางมูเซอ
17.	Ban Huai Nam Khun	บ้านห้วยน้ำขุ่น
18.	Ban Huai Nam Khun	บ้านห้วยน้ำขุ่น
19.	Ban Pa Sang Saen Suk Daen	บ้านป่าซางแสนสุดแดน

=== Local administration ===
The whole area of the subdistrict is covered by the subdistrict administrative organization (SAO) Mae Fa Luang (องค์การบริหารส่วนตำบลแม่ฟ้าหลวง).
