= Nematopoa =

Scientific classification
- Kingdom: Plantae
- Clade: Tracheophytes
- Clade: Angiosperms
- Clade: Monocots
- Clade: Commelinids
- Order: Poales
- Family: Poaceae
- Subfamily: Chloridoideae
- Tribe: Triraphideae
- Genus: Nematopoa; C.E.Hubb.
- Species: N. longipes

Binomial name
- Nematopoa longipes (Stapf & C.E.Hubb.) C.E.Hubb.

Synonyms
- Triraphis longipes Stapf & C.E.Hubb.; Crinipes longipes (Stapf & C.E.Hubb.) C.E.Hubb.

Genus of grasses

Nematopoa is a genus of African plants in the grass family. The only known species is Nematopoa longipes, native to Zambia and Zimbabwe.
