= Thoet Thai =

Thoet Thai เทอดไทย
- Tambon
- Interactive map of Thoet Thai
- Coordinates: 20°18′30″N 99°38′40″E
- Country: Thailand
- Province: Chiang Rai
- Amphoe: Mae Fa Luang

Population (2020)
  - Total: 23,392
- Time zone: UTC+7 (TST)
- Postal code: 57240
- TIS 1099: 571501

Thoet Thai (Thai: เทอดไทย) is a tambon (subdistrict) of Mae Fa Luang District, in Chiang Rai Province, Thailand. In 2020 it had a total population of 23,392 people.

== History ==
The subdistrict was created effective May 29, 1991 by splitting off 15 administrative villages from Mae Rai, Mae Kham.

== Administration ==
=== Central administration ===
The tambon is subdivided into 19 administrative villages (muban).

No.	Name	Thai
1.	Ban Thoet Thai	บ้านเทอดไทย
2.	Ban Saen Mueang Ko	บ้านแสนเมืองโก
3.	Ban Aku Ahai	บ้านอากู่อาไฮ
4.	Ban Pu Na	บ้านปูนะ
5.	Ban Phaya Phrai Lao Na	บ้านพญาไพรเล่ามา
6.	Ban Phaya Phrai Lao Cho	บ้านพญาไพรเล่าจอ
7.	Ban Mae Mo	บ้านแม่หม้อ
8.	Ban Pang Ma Hin	บ้านปางมะหัน
9.	Ban Mong Kao Lang	บ้านม้งเก้าหลัง
10.	Ban Huai Uen	บ้านห้วยอื้น
11.	Ban Phaya Phrai Li Thu	บ้านพญาไพรลิทู่
12.	Ban Mong Paet Lang	บ้านม้งแปดหลัง
13.	Ban Thoet Thai Nueng	บ้านเทอดไทยหนึ่ง
14.	Ban Huai Mo	บ้านห้วยหม้อ
15.	Ban Pha Chi	บ้านผาจี
16.	Ban Cha Ti	บ้านจะตี
17.	Ban Thu Mo Ame	บ้านทูหมออาเน
18.	Ban Mae Kham Noi	บ้านแม่คำน้อย
19.	Ban Cha Pa	บ้านจะป่า

=== Local administration ===
The whole area of the subdistrict is covered by the subdistrict administrative organization (SAO) Thoet Thai (องค์การบริหารส่วนตำบลเทอดไทย).
