= Ban Hin Taek =

Village in Chiang Rai province, Thailand

Coordinates: 20.2471°N 99.6590°E

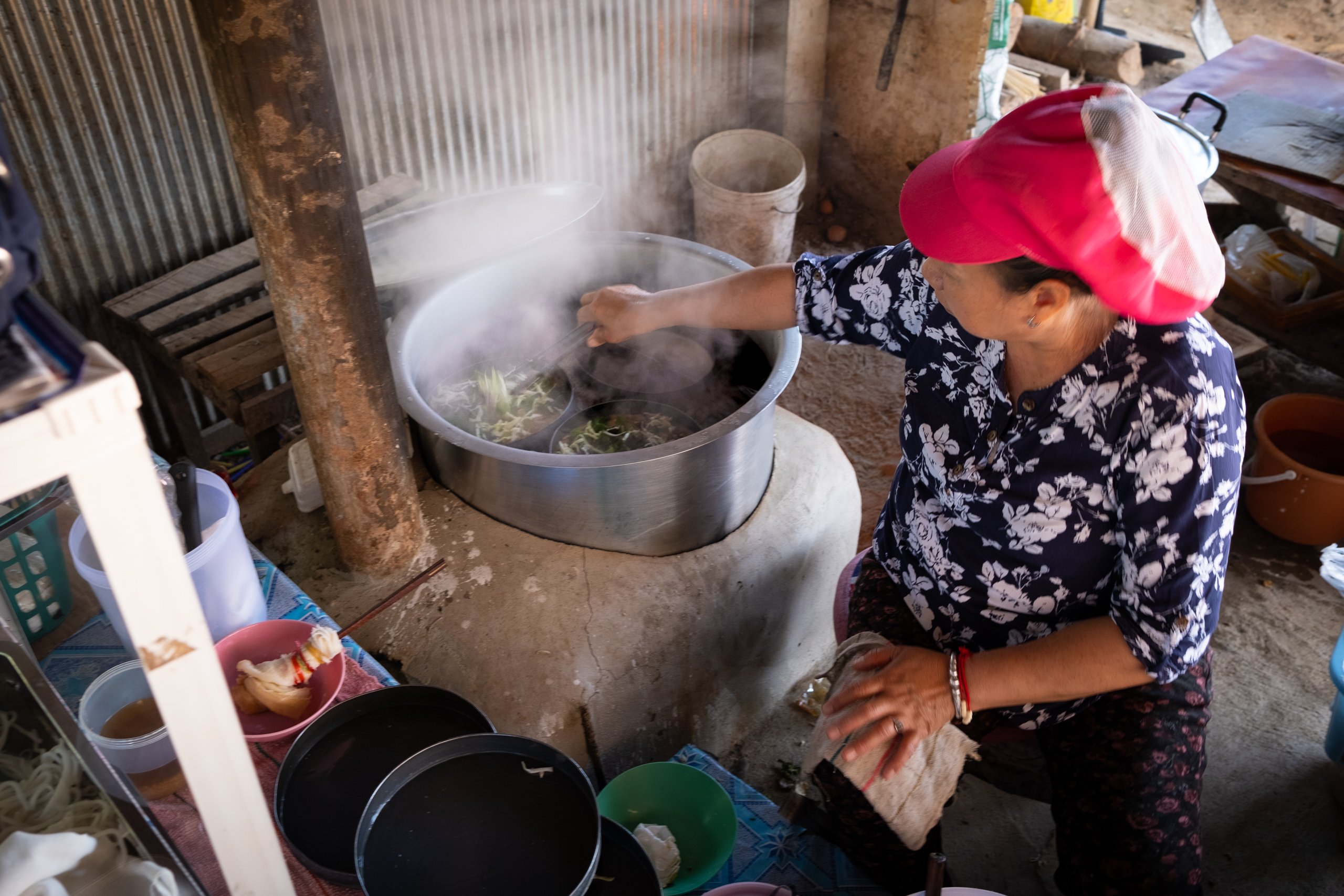
A cook preparing Tai Yai dish khao soi noi songkhrueang in Ban Therd Thai

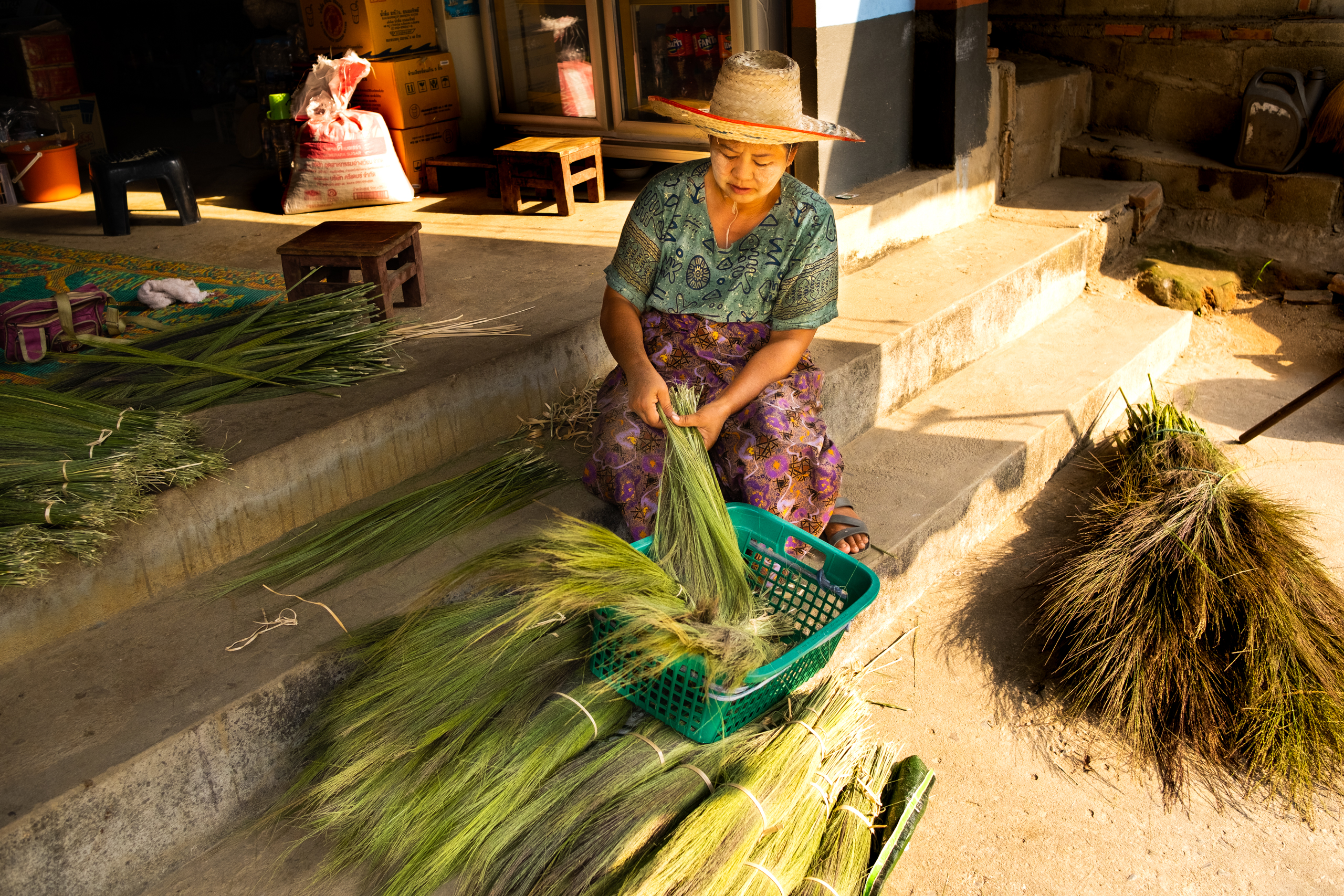
A Tai Yai lady crafting brooms in Ban Therd Thai

Ban Hin Taek or Baan Hin Taek (Thai: บ้านหินแตก; RTGS: Ban Hin Taek, lit. "The Village of Broken Stone") now renamed Ban Therd Thai (Thai: บ้านเทอดไทย; RTGS: Ban Thoet Thai, lit. “Village to Honour Thailand”), is a village found in the Chiang Rai area in the northern part of Thailand. This village, composed mainly of Akha people, has had a very vivid history involving the drug leader known as Khun Sa. Despite being called Ban Therd Thai, the village will be referred to as Ban Hin Taek which is the name the villagers refer to when talking about their village.

== Origins and location ==
Ban Hin Taek is located beyond Doi Mae Salong in Northern Thailand. It is just south of the Thai-Burma border located in the Golden Triangle. In order to reach Ban Hin Taek, one must take the road which starts at Bap Basang on Route 110 between Chiang Rai and Mae Sai. Route 1130 goes west into the mountains where its final destination is Doi Mae Salong. The road eventually becomes Route 1234, a surfaced road. If going further along this road, one will come across a dirt road going north towards the Burmese border. This is the road to Ban Hin Taek.

Ban Hin Taek is a village in a valley which is “like a finger pointing” into the Shan State. It is surrounded by hills that have been scarred by slash-and-burn agriculture. From Ban Hin Taek it is possible to see the summit of Doi Tung, a mountain approximately 1322 metres high.

Ban Hin Taek is not a small village. Its inhabitants have expanded the village along a road for more than 3 kilometres towards the Burmese border. Its prosperity is influenced by the agricultural trade, but also because of the drug trade that existed for some time in Ban Hin Taek.

== History ==
It is believed that Ban Hin Taek was the first Akha village in Thailand. It was founded in 1903 when the Akha entered Thailand from the easternmost Shan states of Burma. From that point onward we know very little of the happenings in Ban Hin Taek. Once Khun Sa appeared in Ban Hin Taek, we have an inflow of articles concerning Ban Hin Taek and his involvement with it.

“Ban Hin Taek's village headman Duangdee Khemmawongse recalls, ‘Khun Sa came to live at Ban Hin Taek in late 1964, when he was around 30 and left a year later. In 1976, he came back again with his wife and children.’” In 1974, Khun Sa was released from Burmese prison he set up his base 2 years later in Ban Hin Taek. As long as the Thai generals were getting some of the drug revenues, Khun Sa could keep operating in Ban Hin Taek. Khun Sa was also beneficial to the Thai because they hoped to topple the Kuomintang (KMT) and Rangoon’s hold on north-eastern Burma so that Thailand could become more influential in that area. At this point in time, Khun Sa appointed himself as liberator of the Shan people advocating for a separate Shan state within Burma. He also agreed to “suppress the Beijing-backed Burmese Communist and Thai Communist Parties” which at the time were very active in that area.

Khun Sa ended up becoming a successful drug warlord in the years 1974-1982. Once the communists came to power in both Laos and South Vietnam in 1975, Khun Sa was able to get a much stronger hold over the drug trade as the KMT’s smuggling routes in the area were now disrupted. With all this newfound wealth came newfound power, and Khun Sa needed a way to secure and protect his power. Thus he set up the Shan United Army (SUA) which at its peak had 20,000 soldiers. Khun Sa’s drug empire continued to grow until the early 1980s when the US Drug Enforcement Administration (DEA) estimated that “70% of heroin consumed in the USA came from his organization.” Thus, the DEA decided to take action.

Before we look at the DEA’s involvement with Khun Sa, let us look at the benefits Ban Hin Taek got from Khun Sa. While he used the village as a base, it did not mean that he didn’t give back to the community. In fact, Khun Sa built health centers, schools and was the major benefactor of the Da Tong Chinese school which the KMT had set up. According to Apinan Apinanderthai, the kamnan of tambon Therd Thai, the villagers “called Khun Sa chao oo, or father.”

However, Khun Sa’s generosity came to an end when the Thai government suddenly changed hands from General Kriangsak Chomanan to General Prem Tinsulanonda. The new general, along with pressure from the DEA who were trying to stop the flow of heroin into the United States (US), decided to kick Khun Sa out of Thailand. Thus, in January 1982, the Thai army, in conjunction with the Border Patrol Police, launched an offensive against Khun Sa’s base in Ban Hin Taek. Many days of violent fighting ensued and eventually the Thai forces used tanks and planes to get the SUA forces to retreat into Burma. Khun Sa managed to escape beforehand to the town of Hua Muang across the Burmese border. This signaled the end of Khun Sa’s drug regime in Ban Hin Taek.

This was not the end of Ban Hin Taek’s involvement in drug trafficking. In recent years, the heroin trade has been replaced with methamphetamines. Ban Hin Taek recently has fallen prey to drug traffickers who operate from across the Burmese border. It has been reported that the traffickers bribed local authorities and that four local residents have been killed by the gangs – “Two were eliminated because they tried to turn their backs on the drug trade, and two others because they were being uncooperative.”

Burma decided to take action against this new development and started shelling the border in February 2001. Soon after they also shelled the outskirts of Ban Hin Taek. This wasn’t the end of the new Burmese offensive. In March 2001 Burma prepared more troops and set up for further artillery strikes. As a result, Thai officials were ready to evacuate the villages along the Burmese border to Ban Therd Thai in order to secure their safety. However, there is no evidence that the Burmese military took any further action at this time.

The latest news coming out of Ban Hin Taek since 2001 was, when on October 26, 2007, Khun Sa died. A funeral was arranged for Khun Sa in order to commemorate his death, but to also attract tourism to the village. From this point on, investors have approached the village trying to develop it and attract tourists to the area.

== Economy ==
Ban Hin Taek has a long custom of an agriculture industry outside of the drug trade. This is the local’s main source of income unless they directly worked for Khun Sa. Produce such as tomatoes, maize, onions, garlic and potatoes are grown and then sold in other places in Chiang Rai. There is also a tea factory in the village.

Ban Hin Taek also has a cross-border trade. Most of this trade is legal, but the villagers who dally in the drug trade always have to be careful of their illegal actions. As mentioned above, the drug trade allowed Khun Sa to build schools and other public facilities which helped the economic situation of the village.

Since Khun Sa was expelled from Ban Hin Taek, the village slowly started building a tourist industry. The plan was to turn Khun Sa’s old house into a museum and create new jobs for the locals. “However, local authorities are still reluctant to agree to the idea, fearing the village’s history will be distorted by investors, who may focus only on their own benefits.” Nevertheless, the village now hosts a resort where people can go mountain biking in the mountains around Ban Hin Taek. The renovation of Khun Sa’s house was completed and has become a museum.

In 2007 the village committee set up a development plan for the village. Resort hotels were to be built in order to accommodate tourists. The committee still fears that investors will abuse Ban Hin Taek, forgoing all of its cultural diversity and customs in favour of profits.

== Culture ==
Ban Hin Taek population of approximately 3000 people is ethnically diverse consisting of Shan, Yunnanese, Akha, Lisu, Lahu, and other tribespeople. The Akha, who were the founders of Ban Hin Taek as stated earlier, are the predominant tribe.

The Akha women wear much silver and often wear striped leggings in order to carry firewood and dry goods up to their homes. The houses in Ban Hin Taek are not built in an Akha style, but instead show signs of Yunnanese influence. They are built of wattle and mud on solid ground instead of the commonly found houses built on stilts.

The abundant religions practiced by the villagers are probably the best example to highlight the cultural diversity of Ban Hin Taek. There is a Thai Buddhist wat on the north-eastern edge of the village, a mosque on the western front and a little ways out of Ban Hin Taek, a large Chinese temple resides. Thus, there are many religious places of worship to satisfy most of Ban Hin Taek’s villagers.

Every year Ban Hin Taek celebrates the Songkran Festival. This is less of a cultural tradition than a national tradition, but a tradition nonetheless.
