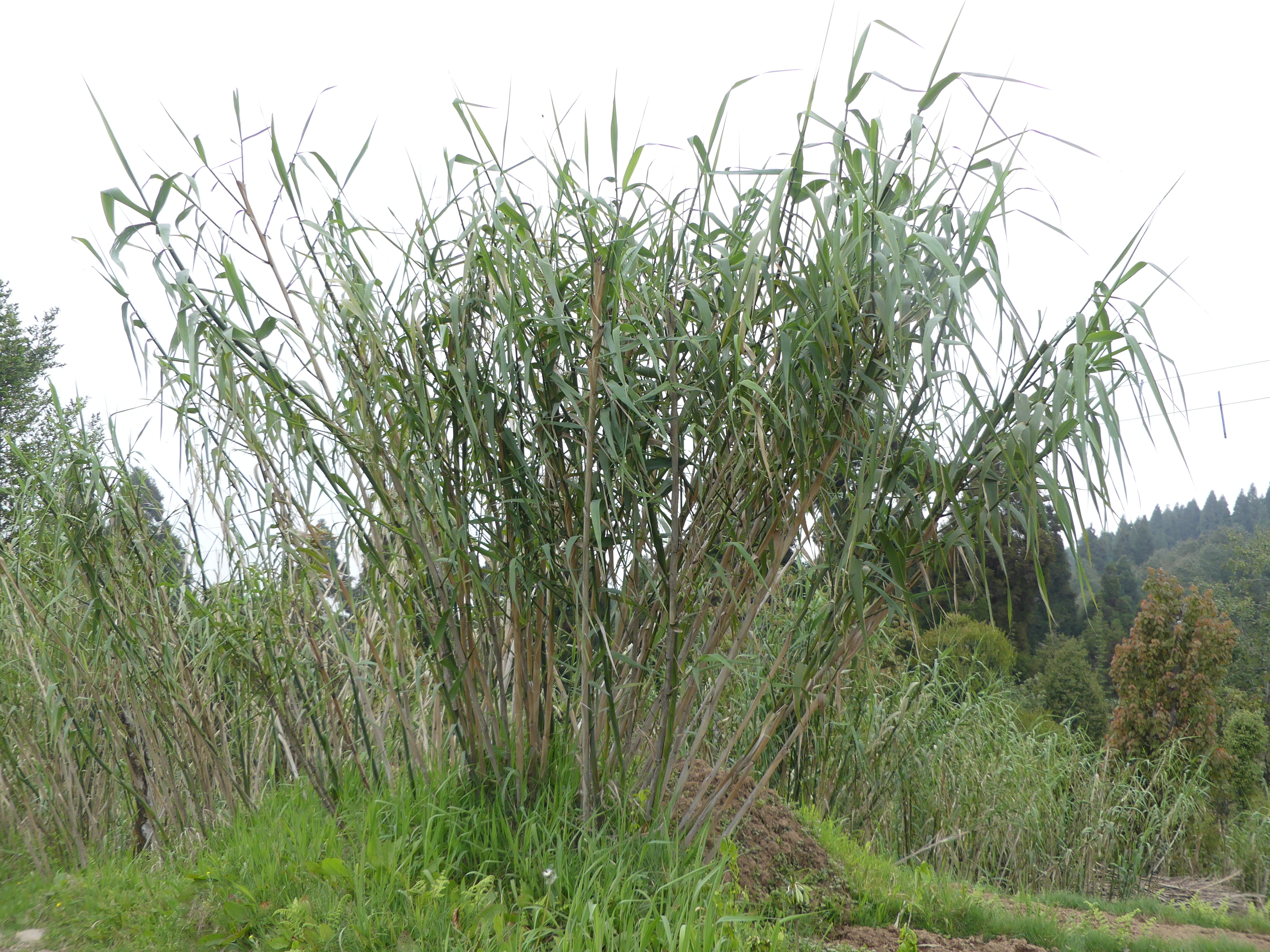

Scientific classification
- Kingdom: Plantae
- Clade: Tracheophytes
- Clade: Angiosperms
- Clade: Monocots
- Clade: Commelinids
- Order: Poales
- Family: Poaceae
- Subfamily: Chloridoideae
- Genus: Neyraudia
- Species: N. reynaudiana

Binomial name
- Neyraudia reynaudiana (Kunth) Keng ex A.S.Hitchc.

= Neyraudia reynaudiana =

Species of grass

Neyraudia reynaudiana, commonly known as Burma reed, silk reed, cane grass, or false reed, is a tall, perennial, large-plumed grass native to subtropical Asia, but invasive in southern Florida in the United States.

== Description ==
The stems of Burma reed, with flower stalks, are from 3 to 15 feet (0.91 to 4.57 m) tall, depending on soil and moisture conditions. The leaves are 8 to 10 inches (20 to 25 cm) long and hairless, except for a single line of horizontal hairs at the juncture of the upper and lower portions of the leaf. Stems are approximately 0.5 inches (1.3 cm) wide, round, solid, and have nodes (stem-leaf junctures) every 3 to 5 inches (7.6 to 12.7 cm) along the stem. The flower plumes, which can be up to 3 feet (0.91 m) long, are composed of many hundreds of tiny flowers and have a shimmery, silky appearance. Flowering occurs in April and October in south Florida, each clump producing an average of forty stalks and twelve to twenty flowering plumes. Burma reed resembles several other tall grasses, including common reed (Phragmites communis), giant reed (Arundo donax), pampas grass (Cortaderia selloana) and sugar cane (Saccharum officinarum).

== Biology and spread ==
Burma reed reproduces by seed and through underground stems called rhizomes. Burma reed plants flower twice each year, producing hundreds of thousands of tiny seeds that are dispersed by the wind. New clumps of Burma reed emerge from rhizomes that may be embedded in sand, soil, or rubble.

== Native range ==
Burma reed is widely distributed in warm, subtropical habitats in Southeast Asia and Indomalaya, including portions of Japan, southern China, Vietnam, Laos, Cambodia, Thailand, Malaya, Myanmar (Burma), Bhutan, Nepal, and eastern India. It occurs in bogs, in open savannahs, on upland cliffs, and along forest and road edges, and from sea level to altitudes of 6,500 feet (2,000 m).

== Range in the United States ==
Neyraudia reynaudiana was first introduced into the United States 11 January 1915 (Plant Introduction # 39690 as N. madagascariensis, presented by Mr. C.C. Calder, Royal Botanic Garden) by the U.S. Department of Agriculture South of Miami. There were also later introductions, including one on 17 April 1916 (Plant Introduction # 42529 as N. madagascariensis, presented by Maj. A.T. Gage, Superintendent, Royal Botanic Garden). According to a cryptic annotation on the label, the latter introduction is apparently also the source of sheet 899975 at the U.S. National Herbarium (Smithsonian National Museum of Natural History, Herbarium code:US) dated Nov. 1916 from Chico, California. Both introductions were originally from Sidpur near Calcutta, India. A letter attached to (U.S.) sheet 1385256, a collection of the species by Paul Weatherwax on 18 April 1927 from along Bay Shore Drive SE of Miami, explains that he had seen it a Chapman Field in 1925. He also states that Mr. Bissett showed him several plants of this at the bamboo farm near Savannah (another USDA facility in Georgia). Sheet 1259803 (U.S.) is his collection from Chapman Field, 2 Nov. 1925, inscribed "Not in cultivation". Another sheet at the Herbarium has a letter from noted horticulturalist Liberty Hyde Bailey to noted agrostologist Albert Spears Hitchcock on 23 January 1926 attached. In the letter he explains that he took the plant into cultivation at Chapman Field and speculates that it had been released in Coconut Grove where he found it near residences, through dumping of garden waste. Another collection at the Herbarium, sheet 899980, is a collection by N.M. Bolander from San Francisco, California in 1861 with the inscription: "Collected in front of a Chinese workhouse".

Although the species has been documented in past cultivation in both Highlands and Alachua Counties in FL, and as stated above, in Georgia and California, those plants have apparently not persisted and it is now found throughout southern Florida in Miami-Dade, Broward, Palm Beach, Lee, Collier, Monroe and Hendry counties.

It initially colonizes the margins of roadways, fields, and forests, from which it can spread to undisturbed areas. The ability of Burma reed to survive at high altitudes in its native range indicates a tolerance to cold and the potential for it to spread further north in the U.S. Seeds and rhizomes are also transported inadvertently in limestone rock from infested quarries that is carried by train from Miami-Dade County to concrete manufacturers throughout the southeastern United States. This unintentional movement of Burma reed material may allow it to invade new sites in Florida and adjacent states near limestone distribution centers.

Reports of the related species, Neyraudia arundinacea, in both California and Florida are traceable to mis-identified specimens of Neyraudia reynaudiana. There are no credible records in the U.S. of N. arundinacea.

== Ecological threat ==
Burma reed damages native Florida ecosystems by crowding and shading out understory plant species and by creating conditions for extremely hot and destructive wildfires. In southern Florida, in Miami-Dade County, including Everglades National Park, it is a serious threat to the globally imperiled pine rocklands community whose pine canopy was largely destroyed in 1992 by Hurricane Andrew. Burma reed is a highly combustible fuel source because of its high overall plant mass, its large feathery flower plumes, and its production of dense, hay-like leaf litter. This litter enhances fire movement along the ground, while the flower plumes carry the flames high into the air. With the aid of winds, these plumes often detach and fly through the air like torches, providing the potential for additional spread. Photographs of its ignition during a wildfire show flames leaping over 30 feet (9.1 m) high, threatening nearby tree canopies.

== Management options ==
Restoration of sites infested with Burma reed requires a long term commitment to ensure effective control and to allow native vegetation to become established. Burma reed's deep roots make mechanical removal an extremely labor-intensive and costly undertaking and causes extensive disturbance to the soil. A more effective management approach involves a combination of cutting or prescribed burning, followed by application of herbicides. After cutting, mowing or burning Burma reed plants down to the ground, a systemic herbicide like glyphosate, mixed with an acidic surfactant, can be applied to prevent new growth. Repeat treatment is likely to be necessary for a couple of years, until seed and rhizome stores are exhausted.

A successful burn of Burma reed reduces the plant's massive stalks to ash, eliminating the cost of vegetation removal. Conveniently, because Burma reed is the first plant to resprout following a fire, it can be sprayed freely with little concern about non-target kills. Burning by itself, whether through prescribed or natural wildfires, may enhance the growth and spread of Burma reed if not followed up with chemical or mechanical control.

In areas where Burma reed is dispersed among desirable native vegetation, individual plants can be cut at the base using a steel blade or string trimmer and the remaining portions sprayed with herbicide to prevent new growth. Resprouts should be treated with a second herbicide application to the new growth. This method requires highly qualified applicators who can target the herbicide to avoid damage to native plants, and may not be cost effective for extensive infestations.
