= Mae Salong Nok =

Coordinates: 20°09′47″N 99°37′21″E

Mae Salong Nok แม่สลองนอก
- Tambon
- Interactive map of Mae Salong Nok
- Country: Thailand
- Province: Chiang Rai
- District: Mae Fa Luang

Population (2005)
  - Total: 15,028
- Time zone: UTC+7 (ICT)

Mae Salong Nok (Thai: แม่สลองนอก) is a village and tambon (subdistrict) of Mae Fa Luang District, in Chiang Rai Province, Thailand. In 2005 it had a population of 15,028 people. The tambon contains 13 villages.
