= Mae Fa Luang district =

District of Thailand

Mae Fa Luang แม่ฟ้าหลวง
- District
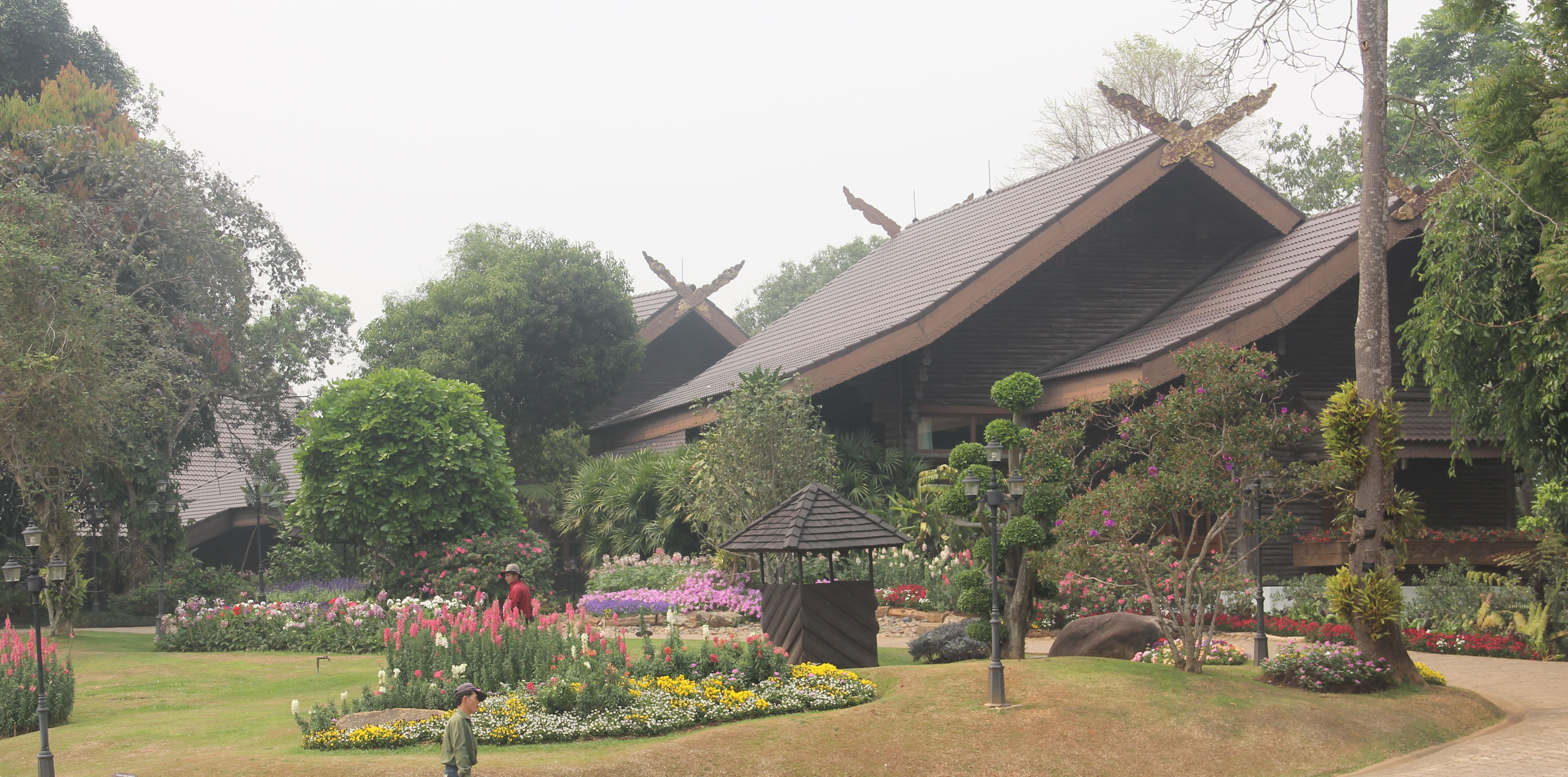
- Doi Tung Royal Villa

- District location in Chiang Rai province
- Coordinates: 20°16′2″N 99°48′5″E
- Country: Thailand
- Province: Chiang Rai
- Seat: Mae Fa Luang
- Subdistricts: 4
- Mubans: 77

Area
  - Total: 641.404 km^{2} (247.647 sq mi)

Population (2015)
  - Total: 76,301
  - Density: 119.4/km^{2} (309/sq mi)
- Time zone: UTC+7 (ICT)
- Postal code: 57110
- Geocode: 5715

Mae Fa Luang (Thai: แม่ฟ้าหลวง, pronounced [mɛ̂ː fáː lǔa̯ŋ]) is a district (amphoe) in the northern part of Chiang Rai province, northern Thailand.

== History ==
The area of Mae Fa Luang was separated from Mae Chan district and created as a minor district (king amphoe) on 1 April 1992. Originally it was composed of the three tambons, Thoet Thai, Mae Salong Nai, and Mae Salong Nok. A fourth sub-district, Mae Fa Luang, was created in 1996. The minor district was upgraded to a full district on 5 December 1996.

== Etymology ==
The name Mae Fa Luang was given by Princess Mother Srinagarindra, who was commonly known as "Mae Fa Luang" (lit. 'royal mother from the sky') by the hill tribespeople of the area.

== Geography ==
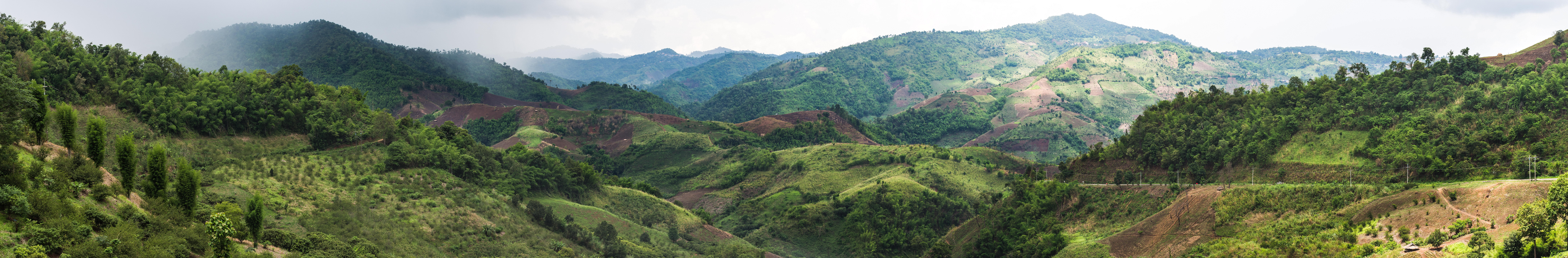
Mountainous countryside south of the village of Santikhiri/Mae Salong Nok, one month into the 2014 wet season

Neighboring districts are (from the east clockwise): Mae Sai, Mae Chan, and Mueang Chiang Rai of Chiang Rai Province and Mae Ai of Chiang Mai province. To the northwest is the Shan State of Myanmar.

== Administration ==
=== Central administration ===
Mae Fa Luang is divided into four subdistricts (tambons), which are further subdivided into 77 administrative villages (mubans).

No.	Name	Thai	Villages	Pop.
1.	Thoet Thai	เทอดไทย	18	22,472
2.	Mae Salong Nai	แม่สลองใน	27	25,539
3.	Mae Salong Nok	แม่สลองนอก	13	15,877
4.	Mae Fa Luang	แม่ฟ้าหลวง	19	12,412

=== Local administration ===
There are four subdistrict administrative organizations (SAO) in the district:

- Thoet Thai (Thai: องค์การบริหารส่วนตำบลเทอดไทย) consisting of subdistrict Thoet Thai.
- Mae Salong Nai (Thai: องค์การบริหารส่วนตำบลแม่สลองใน) consisting of subdistrict Mae Salong Nai.
- Mae Salong Nok (Thai: องค์การบริหารส่วนตำบลแม่สลองนอก) consisting of subdistrict Mae Salong Nok.
- Mae Fa Luang (Thai: องค์การบริหารส่วนตำบลแม่ฟ้าหลวง) consisting of subdistrict Mae Fa Luang.
