= Sao Sanda =

Last princess of Yawnghwe (born 1928)

Princess Sao Sanda
- Princess of Yawnghwe
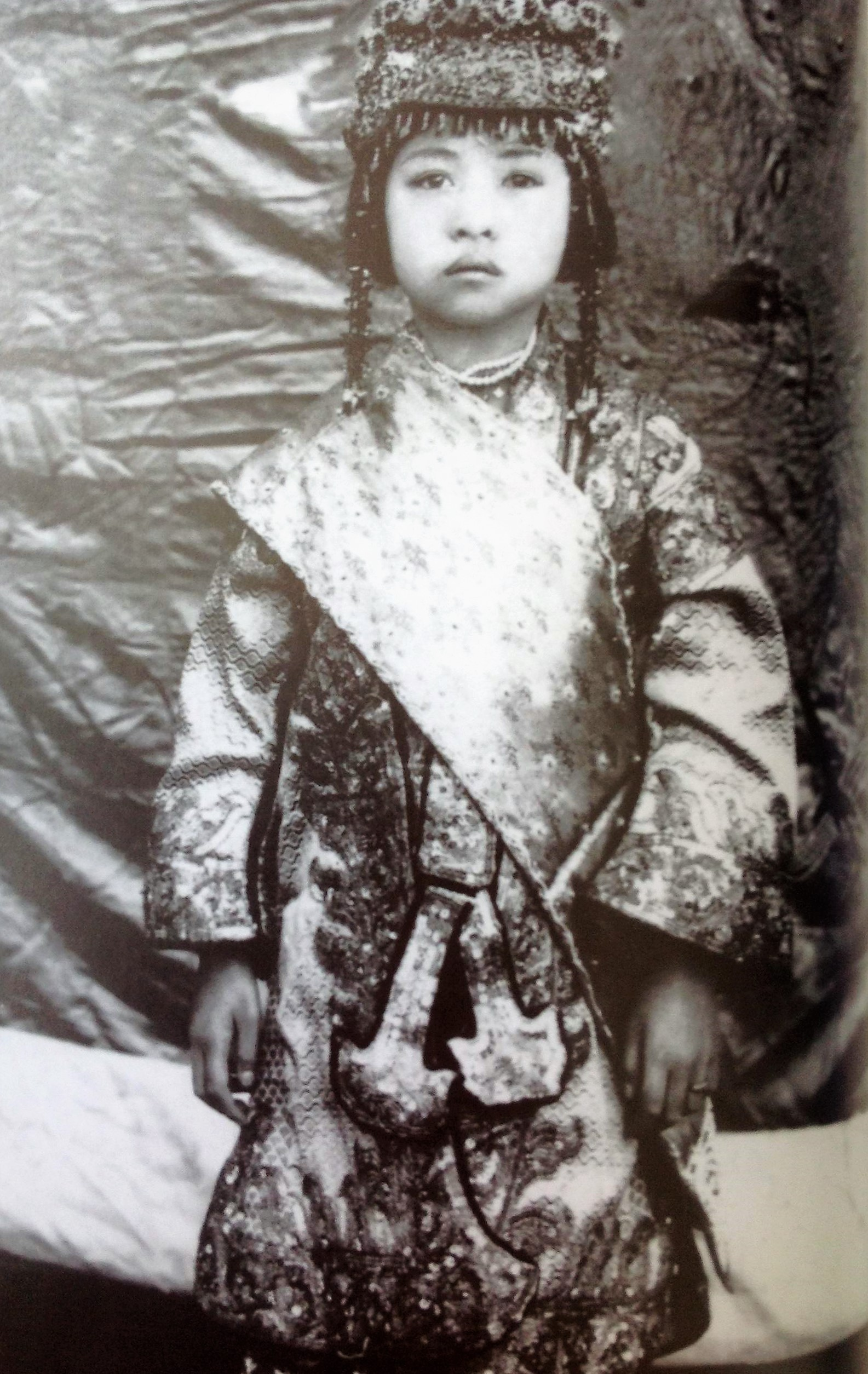
- Sanda, c. 1934
- Born: 20 October 1928 (age 97); Yawnghwe
- Spouse: Peter Simms
Names
- Sao Nang Mya Sanda
- House: Yawnghwe
- Father: Sao Shwe Thaik
- Mother: Sao Nang Mya Sanda
- Religion: Theravada Buddhism
- Education: Girton College, Cambridge (MA, BA)

Princess Sao Sanda (Burmese: စဝ်စန္ဒာ, also known as Sao Nang Mya Sanda, (စောနန်းမြစန္ဒာ) and Sanda Simms; born 20 October 1928) is the last princess of Yawnghwe, a now disestablished Shan state in present-day Myanmar. She is the eldest daughter of the last Saopha of Yawnghwe Sao Shwe Thaik by his consort Sao Nang Sanda. A journalist at Reuters, she coauthored several books with her husband Peter Simms. Her 2008 book The Moon Princess: Memories of the Shan States chronicles a turbulent period in Burma's history, providing both her life story and a chronicle of her father, the first president of the Union of Burma after its independence.

== Life ==
Sao Sanda was born on 20 October 1928 into the royal family of Yawnghwe. She was the firstborn daughter of Sao Shwe Thaik and his mistress Sao Nang Sanda. She studied at the American Methodist School in Kalaw. In 1947, she accompanied her father to the Panglong Conference. Still in 1947, she alongside her father and stepmother Sao Nang Hearn Kham attended the wedding of Crown Princess Elizabeth. She continued her education in the UK, and earned her B.A. (Hons) in 1953 and M.A. (Hons) in 1956 from Girton College, Cambridge.

Sanda was married to Peter Simms, a journalist, in Bangkok. In 1956, after returning to Burma, she worked as a newsreader and commentator for the Burma Broadcasting Service for four years, while her husband Peter Simms worked at Rangoon University. The couple fled the country after the 1962 Burmese coup d'état. Her father was arrested by the Union Revolutionary Council headed by General Ne Win. Her brother, who was 17 at the time, was killed in the military coup, apparently the only casualty on the day of the disturbances. After moving to Laos, they worked as journalists in several countries, including Thailand, Singapore, Hong Kong, Canada and Oman. After relocating to France and the United Kingdom in 1987, they began writing books. After the death of her husband in 2002, she began writing her memoirs, The Moon Princess: Memories of the Shan States, which was published in 2008. Her book was translated into Burmese by historian Maung Than Swe under the title The Kanbawza Princess Sao Sanda (ကမ္ဘောဇ မင်းသမီးလေး စဝ်စန္ဒာ); this translated edition was first published in 2014.

As of 2022, Sao Sanda and Saw Nwam Oo (a princess of Lawksawk State) were the only living attendees of the 1947 Panglong Conference. Sao Sanda's Panglong experience is described in The Moon Princess while Saw Nwam Oo described her own experience of the event in her own autobiography, My Lost World.

== Works ==
- The Moon Princess: Memories of the Shan States
- Great Lords Of The Sky: Burma's Shan Aristocracy Open access download: https://archive.org/details/Volume48GreatLordsOfTheSkyBurmasShanAristocracyBySaoSandaSimms>
- Laos, Then: Travels in the Kingdom (co-authored with Peter Simms)
- The Kingdoms of Laos (co-authored with Peter Simms)
- The Wines of Corbières & Fitou (co-authored with Peter Simms)
