= Hso Khan Pha =

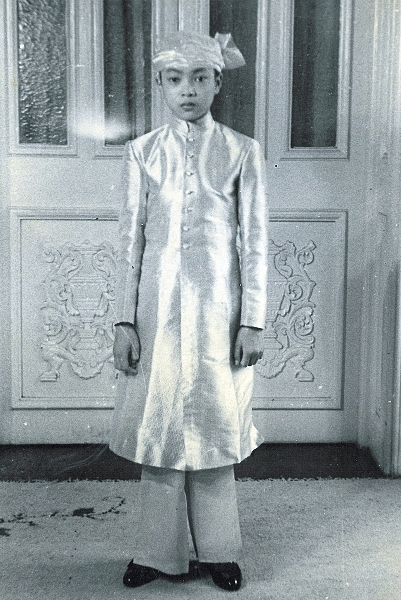
- Hso Khan Pha at age 14

Head of the royal house of Yawnghwe
- Tenure: 21 November 1962 – 4 October 2016
- Predecessor: Sao Shwe Thaik
- Successor: Haŏ Shwe-Thaike
- Born: 15 April 1938; Yawnghwe State, British Burma
- Died: 4 October 2016 (aged 78); Innisfail, Alberta, Canada
- Spouse: Rosemary Catherine Otte
- Issue: Rebecca Sanda-Devi; Haŏ Shwe-Thaike; Jessica Ying Sita; Hsŏ Kham-Serk
- Father: Sao Shwe Thaik
- Mother: Sao Nang Hearn Kham

Prince Hso Khan Pha of Yawnghwe (Burmese: စဝ်ခမ်းဖ, a.k.a. Tiger; 15 April 1938 – 4 October 2016) was a prince of Yawnghwe. He was a son of Sao Shwe Thaik, the last Saopha of Yawnghwe and Sao Nang Hearn Kham, the Mahadevi (consort). He was a consulting geologist based in Canada.

== Education ==
His education was first started at a local school in Yawnghwe (Nyaung Shwe) at convents run by Roman Catholic Church nuns at Kalaw and Hsenwi (Theinni) in the Shan State. Later in 1949, he attended The Doon School at Dehra Dun (Dehradun) in India, graduating in 1954; studied for two years at Rangoon University; attended the Bell School of Languages at Cambridge, England, and the Cambridgeshire Technical College; graduated in 1964 from the University of Keele, England, with a BA (Hons) in Geology and Political Institutions.

== Life ==
His mother fled with her family to Thailand in October 1963 after Sao Shwe Thaik had been deposed in the March 1962 Burmese coup d'état and died in prison in November 1962. Upon crossing the Thai border, the Provincial governor called on the Mahadevi with a message of protection from the king. During her time in Thailand she organized and founded the Shan State War Council (SSWC) and Shan State Army (of resistance to Ne Win’s dictatorship) in 1964. She became its leader and commander-in-chief and her second son Chao Tzang served as her right-hand man. At the time of his father’s death, he was studying in England. While in exile he participated in the independence struggle of the Shan State. Hso Khan Pha was politically active in many groups, pressuring the government of Burma. He also worked with Shan exiles abroad to help provide schooling for displaced Shan children whose parents were unable to send them to school. He tried to make the Shan State an independent country. The case has been presented to many heads of state in western countries as well as to the United Nations. He was proclaimed Head of State and President of the Federated Shan States, declared Shan State independence, by Shan State exiles and sympathizers in 2005.

Hso Khan Pha worked with exiled Prince Shwebomin of Burma to promote the protection of the Shan People's religious, traditional, culture, and indigenous land rights in Burma. In 2007, he attended an international peace conference in Los Angeles to speak out against the government of Burma.

Upon graduating he was hired as a geologist in England, and went to prospect for diamonds in the Ivory Coast. West Africa, for the DeBeers, Diamond Corporation Limited; in 1966 transferred to Hudson Bay Mining and Smelting Company Limited, starting first in Flin Flon, Manitoba, and on to exploration projects in Ontario and Quebec; joined Mattagami Lake Mines as a Senior Exploration Geologist in 1970; in 1972 became Senior Project Geologist in charge of all explorations in western Canada; opened the Western Exploration Office for Mattagami Lake Mines in Edmonton, 1975; became an independent geological consultant in 1976, working briefly in 1977 for Alberta Environment; in 1978 started consulting in the oil-patch; sought the Liberal nomination in the federal riding of Elk Island in April 1993.

== Death ==
He died in his sleep of a heart attack on 4 October 2016.

== Associations ==
- APEGGA (Association of Professional Engineers, Geologists, and Geophysicists of Alberta); Association of Exploration Geochemists; Fellow, Geological Association of Canada and former member, Association of Alberta Petroleum Geologists.
- Founding member and past President of the human rights society - Burma Watch International.
- Royal Alberta United Services Institute; Associate of the Garrison Officers Club, Mewata Armouries, Calgary.

== Family ==
Tiger married Rosemary Catherine Otte in 1976 and had four children, including: Rebecca Sanda-Devi, Haŏ Shwe-Thaike, Jessica Ying Sita, and Hsŏ Kham-Serk.

== Genealogy ==
The Yawnghwe royal family is descended from King Beingyayett (who ruled in 661–600 BC). The family ruled in what is now northern Burma and southwestern China. In 1358, the Saopha (King/Ruler) Si Hseng Hpa, a direct ancestor of this family formed his capital at Yawnghwe.

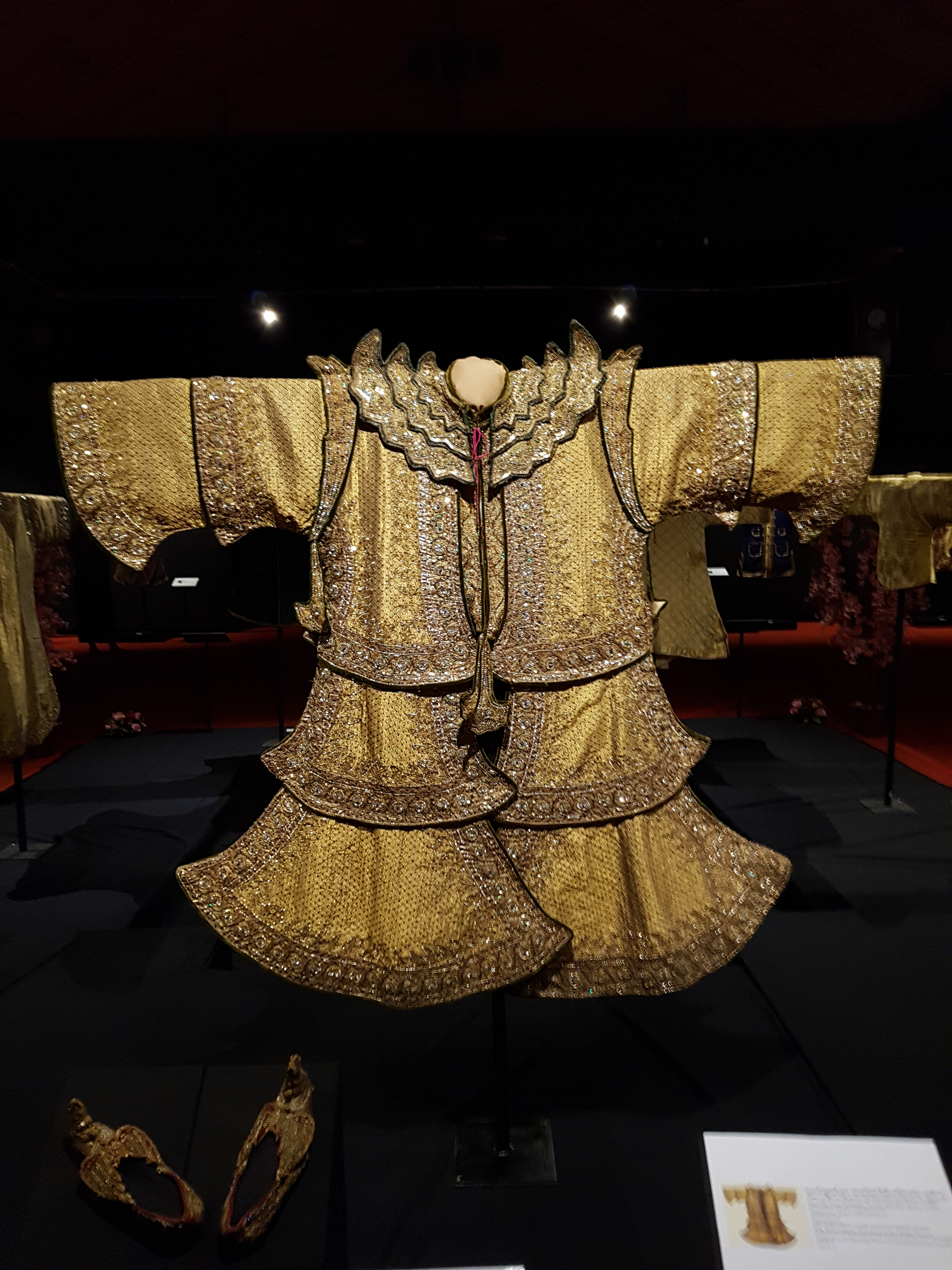
Ceremonial Tribute Robe of Saopha Sao Maung created in 1867

In 1850, Sao Suu Deva, Crown Prince of Yawnghwe, was assassinated by a rival claimant. King Mindon of Burma helped Prince Deva's son Sao Maung (a.k.a. Sir Sao Maung - knighted by George V of the United Kingdom) regain the crown of Yawnghwe. In 1927, Sao Shwe Thaike ascended the throne of Yangwhe, succeeding his uncle Sao Maung.

Sao Shwe Thaike (b. October 1896) was instrumental in laying the foundation in 1945 for what was to become the Union of Burma in 1948. Thaike served as President of the Constitutional Assembly and was elected by Parliament to serve as the first President of the Union in 1948. On 4 January 1948 Louis Mountbatten, 1st Earl Mountbatten of Burma, handed the Union of Burma its independence.

The Mahadevi Sao Nang Hearn Kham (b. May 1916), Tiger’s mother, is sister to Saopha of Hsenwi, another ancient House. It is said by some Thai scholars that King Ramakhamheng of Sukhothai (the 13th Century precursor of modern Thailand ) was a scion of the House of Hsenwi.

== Quote ==
- "I support all ethnic groups' rights to have their own federal states, probably in US style or Canadian style. I understand that Quebec Province in Canada is an autonomic federal state. Shan state can be like that?".

== See also ==
- Burmese invasion of Assam
