= Than Swe =

Than Swe may refer to:

- Than Swe (diplomat), Minister of Foreign Affairs for Myanmar since 2023
- Than Swe (historian), Deputy Minister of Culture for Myanmar from 2012 to 2015
- Than Shwe, former military ruler of Myanmar.
