= Shan people =

Southeast Asian ethnic group

Tai Shan; တႆး; Tai Yai
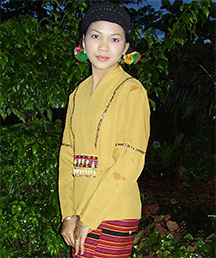
- Shan woman from Lai-Hka, Shan State

Total population
- c. 5 million + (est.)

Regions with significant populations
- Myanmar (mainly Shan State): 5 million (Note: According to the CIA Factbook, the Shan make up 9% of the total population of Myanmar (55 million) or approximately 5 million people.)

Languages
- Shan, Burmese, Northern Thai, Thai, Chinese

Religion
- Majority: Theravada Buddhism, Tai folk religion

Related ethnic groups
- Zhuang, Chinese Shan, Tai Lao, Nung, Bouyei, Dong, Tai Thai, Tai Ahom,

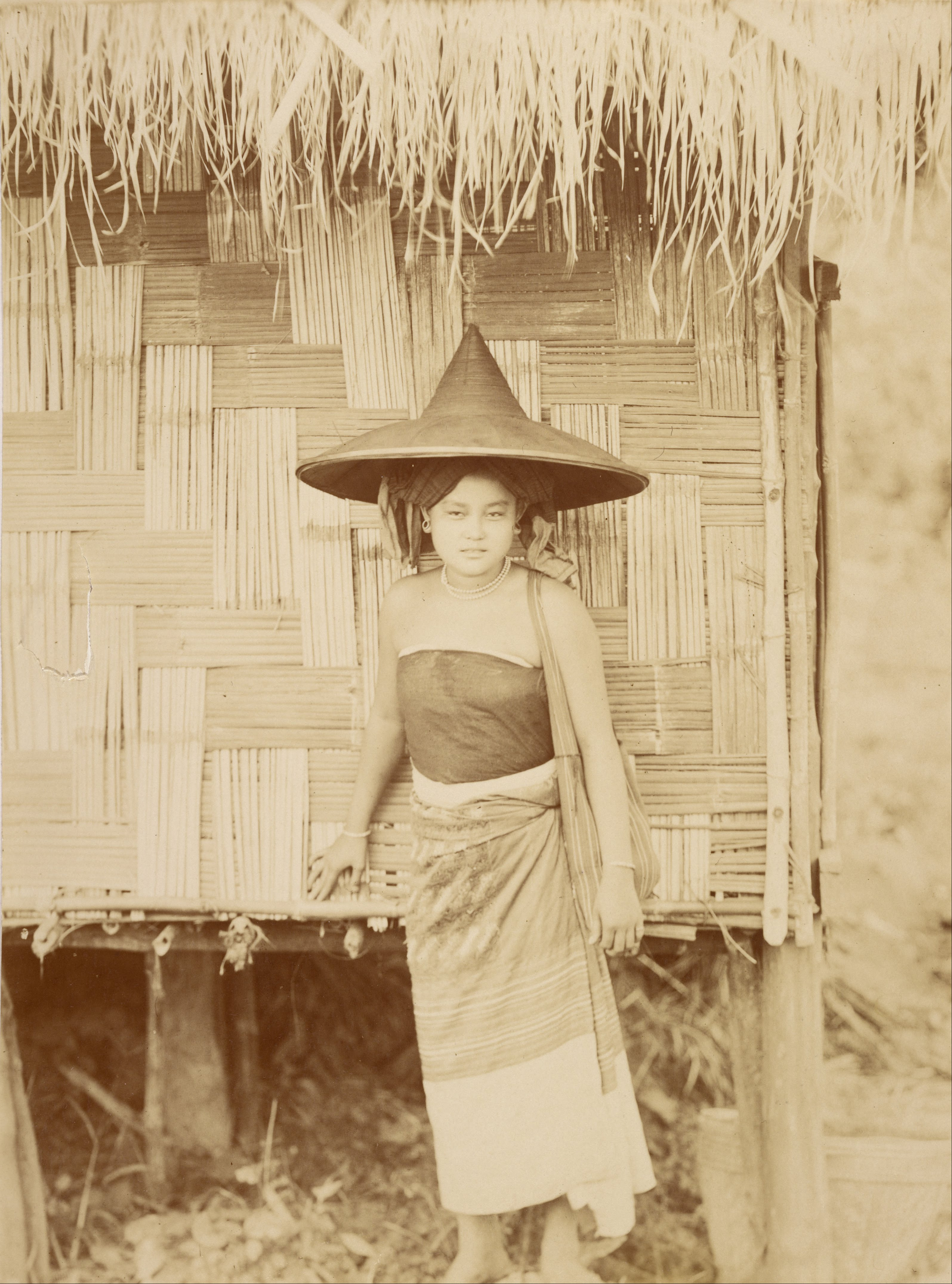
1889 photograph of a Shan woman

The Shan people (Shan: တႆး, pronounced [taj˥], Chinese: 掸族, pronounced [ʂän⁵¹ t͡su³⁵] or Burmese: ရှမ်းလူမျိုး, pronounced [ʃáɰ̃ lùmjó]) (also known as the Tai Long (တႆးလူင်) or Tai Yai) are a Tai ethnic group native to Southeast Asia. They are the largest minority ethnic group in Myanmar (Burma). The Burmese Shan have historically coexisted and integrated within the broader framework of the Burmese nation, remaining an integral part of the country's socio-political history and identity across successive historical eras.

In Myanmar, the term "Shan" serves as a generic umbrella designation for all Tai-speaking groups. Although no comprehensive nationwide census has been conducted since 1935, the Shan population is reasonably estimated to be at 5.5 million people. They represent around 10% of Myanmar's total population. The majority of Shan people are members of Theravada Buddhism.

== Geographic distribution ==
The Shan population is predominantly concentrated within the boundaries of modern Myanmar, though their historical settlements extend into adjacent territories across Southeast Asia and South Asia.

They primarily inhabit the Shan State, but significant communities also reside across adjoining administrative divisions, including the Mandalay Region, Kachin State, Kayah State, Sagaing Region, and Kayin State. Taunggyi serves as the capital of Shan State, functioning as the chief urban hub alongside other major regional cities such as Lashio, Kengtung, Tachileik, and Hsipaw. Beyond the borders of Myanmar, closely related Tai-speaking groups live in southwestern China (where they are officially designated as the Dai people), Laos, northern Thailand, northern Vietnam, and Cambodia (known historically as the Kula people). Furthermore, their ancestral diaspora extends into Northeast India, notably in Assam and Meghalaya, where they are represented by the Ahom people.

== Etymology ==
The Shan use the endonym Tai (တႆး) in reference to themselves, which is also used in Chinese (Chinese: 傣族; pinyin: Dǎizú), sometimes with a larger scope.

Shan (ရှမ်း) is an exonym from the Burmese language; the term itself was historically spelt သျှမ်း (MLCTS: hsyam:), and is cognate with the term "Siam," the former name of Thailand. The term is extant to Old Burmese, first attested to a Bagan era inscription from 1120, where it referred to Tai-speaking populations east of the kingdom. "Shan" has also been borrowed into Chinese (simplified Chinese: 掸族; traditional Chinese: 撣族; pinyin: Shànzú).

In Thai, the Shan are called Tai Yai (ไทใหญ่, lit. 'Great Tai') or Ngiao (Thai: เงี้ยว) in Tai yuan language. The Shan also have a number of exonyms in other minority languages, including Pa'O: ဖြဝ်ꩻ, Western Pwo Karen: ၥဲၫ့, and Mon သေံဇၞော် (seṃ jnok).

== Sub-ethnicity ==
=== Major subdivisions ===
The major groups of Shan people are:

1. Tai Yai (Shan: တႆးယႂ်ႇ) or Thai Yai (Thai: ไทใหญ่); the 'Shan Proper', by far the largest group, by which all Shan people are known in the Thai language.
2. Tai Lü or Tai Lue (Shan: တႆးလိုဝ်ႉ). Its traditional area is in Xishuangbanna (China) and the eastern states.
3. Tai Khuen or Tai Khün (Shan: တႆးၶိုၼ်), a subgroup of the Tai Yai making up the majority in the Keng Tung area. The former ruling family of Kengtung State belonged to this group.
4. Tai Nüa or Tai Neua, (Shan: တႆးၼိူဝ်). The 'upper' or 'northern Tai'. This group lives north of the Shweli River, mostly in the area of Dehong, China.

The speakers of Shan, Lue, Khun and Nua languages form the majority of Dai nationality in China.

=== Other Tai Shan groups ===
There are various ethnic groups designated as Tai throughout Shan State, Northern Sagaing Division and Kachin State. Some of these groups in fact speak Tibeto-Burman and Mon-Khmer and Assamese languages, although they are assimilated into Shan society.

- Tai Ahom people: The Tai Ahom people live in India's northeastern state of Assam and Arunachal Pradesh where tradition says that they established the Ahom kingdom, or Mueng Doon Soon Kham, and ruled for almost 600 years (1228–1826). They now speak the Assamese language with the Ahom language falling into disuse by the 19th century.
- Tai Mao, living in the area along the banks of the Shweli River (Nam Mao). Chinese Shan language is also known as (Tai) Mao, referring to the old Shan State of Mong Mao.
- Tai Khamti. The Tai Khamti an outlier group speaking the Khamti language. Traditionally they lived in the northernmost and westernmost edges of Shan-settled areas, such as Putao-O, Kachin State. Part of the Tai Khamti were once ruled by the Mongkawng Shan.
- Tai Laing, Tai Leng, or Shan-ni (lit. 'red Shan'), a Tai group living north of Myitkyina in the Kachin / Shan State border area.
- Tai Ting, a group living around the confluence of the Ting and Salween rivers, just to the west of Gengma County, Yunnan, China.
- Tai Taɯ: Taɯ means 'under' or 'south.' This group lives in southern Shan State.
- Tai Nui, a group living to the south and east of Kengtung town.
- Tai Phake. Related to the Tai Khamti, this group has a significant presence in Assam, India.
- Tai Saʔ. The Tai Saʔ speak a variety of Ngochang (Achang), but are part of mainstream Shan society.
- Tai Loi. The Tai Loi speak a Palaungic language resembling De'ang (especially the Bulei dialect of Yunnan) and Silver Palaung. They take part in mainstream Shan society.
- Tai Dam: Also known as the "Black Tai."
- Tai Dón: Also known as the "White Tai".
- Maingtha, a Shan group that speaks a Northern Burmish language

== Religion and culture ==
The majority of Shan are Theravada Buddhists, and Tai folk religion. The Shan constitute one of the four main Buddhist ethnic groups in Burma; the others are the Bamar, the Mon and the Rakhine. The Mon were the main source of early Shan Buddhism and Shan scripts. Among the Shan Buddhists in both Burma and Yunnan are the Zawti sect, an austere sect of Theravada Buddhism whose practitioners are distinguished by their use of palm leaf texts in home altars instead of Buddha images.

Most Shan speak the Shan language and are bilingual in Burmese. The Shan language, spoken by about 5 or 6 million, is closely related to Thai and Lao, and is part of the family of Tai languages. It is spoken in Shan State, some parts of Kachin State, some parts of Sagaing Division in Burma, parts of Yunnan, and in parts of northwestern Thailand, including Mae Hong Son Province and Chiang Mai Province. The two major dialects differ in number of tones: Hsenwi Shan has six tones, while Mongnai Shan has five. The Shan alphabet is an adaptation of the Mon–Burmese script via the Burmese alphabet. However, only a few Shan can read and write in their own language. Shan state is the most illiterate state with over a million illiterates in Myanmar due to lack of basic infrastructures and long ongoing civil war.

The Shan are traditionally wet-rice cultivators, shopkeepers, and artisans.

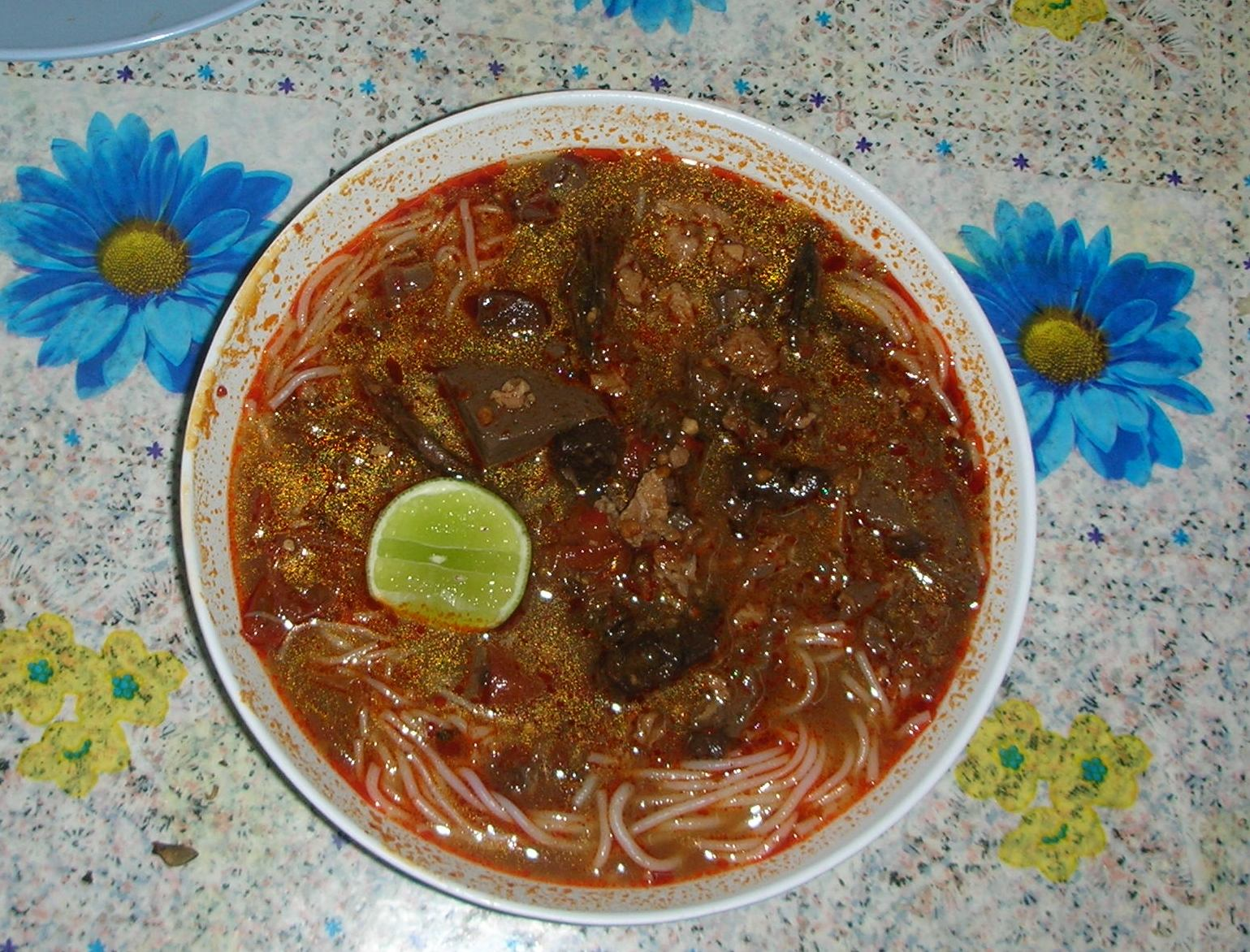
Nam ngiao, a Shan dish

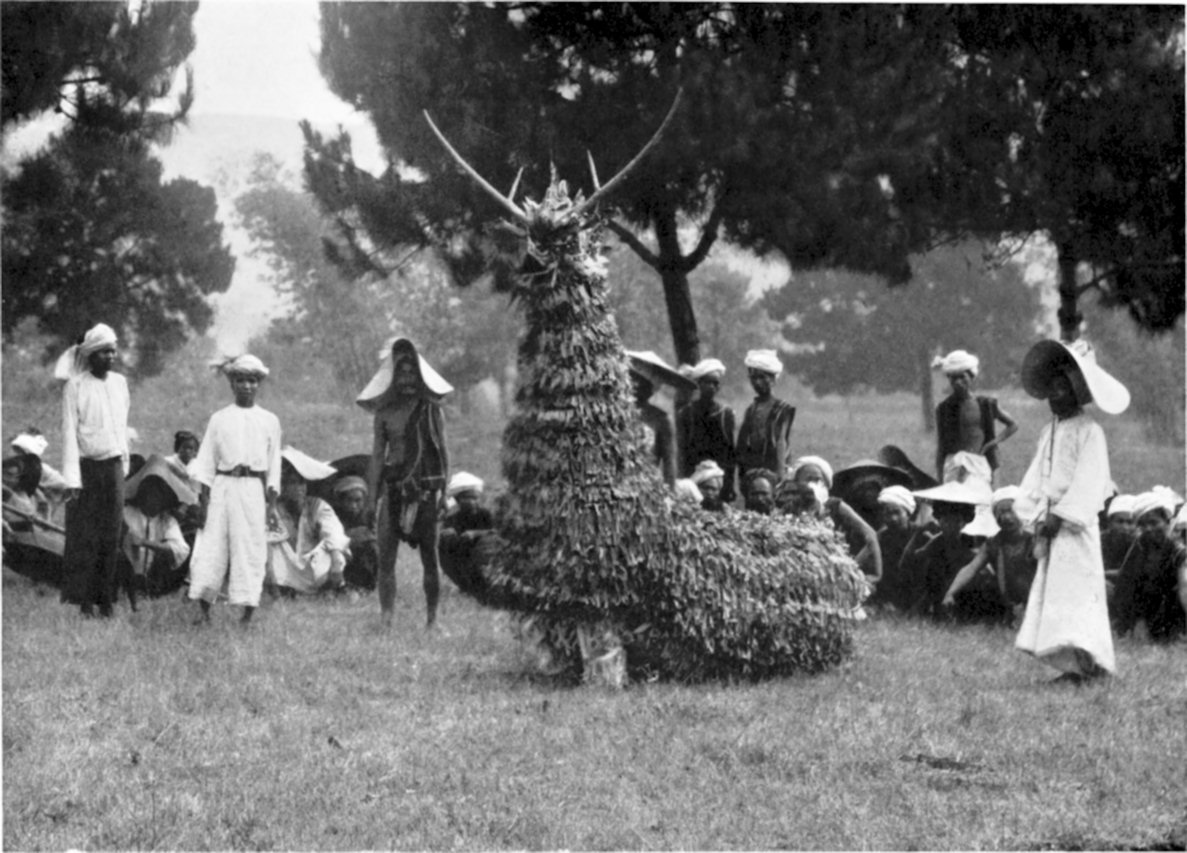
A Shan deer dance ceremony in the early 1900s

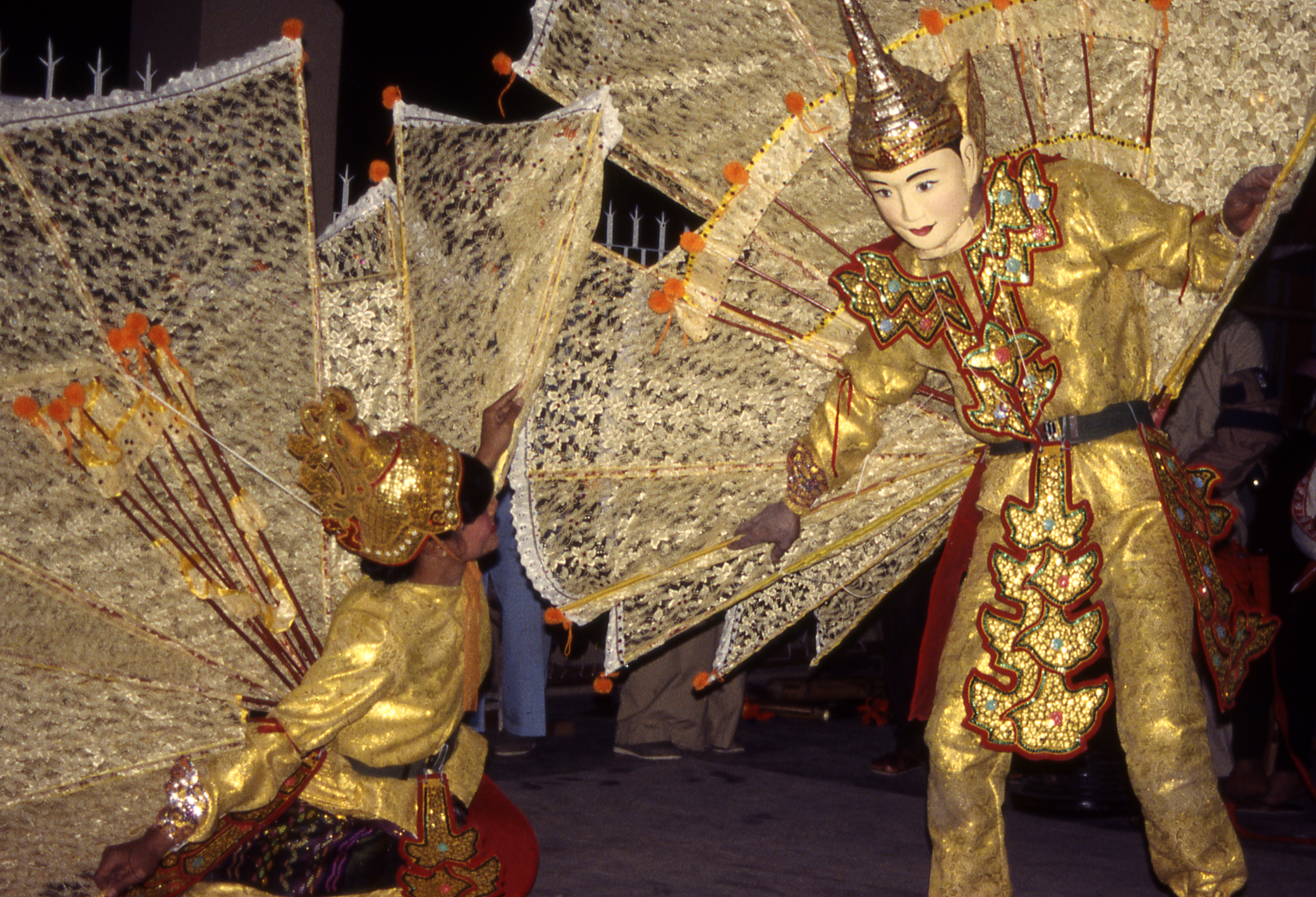
The Shan kinnara and kinnari dance

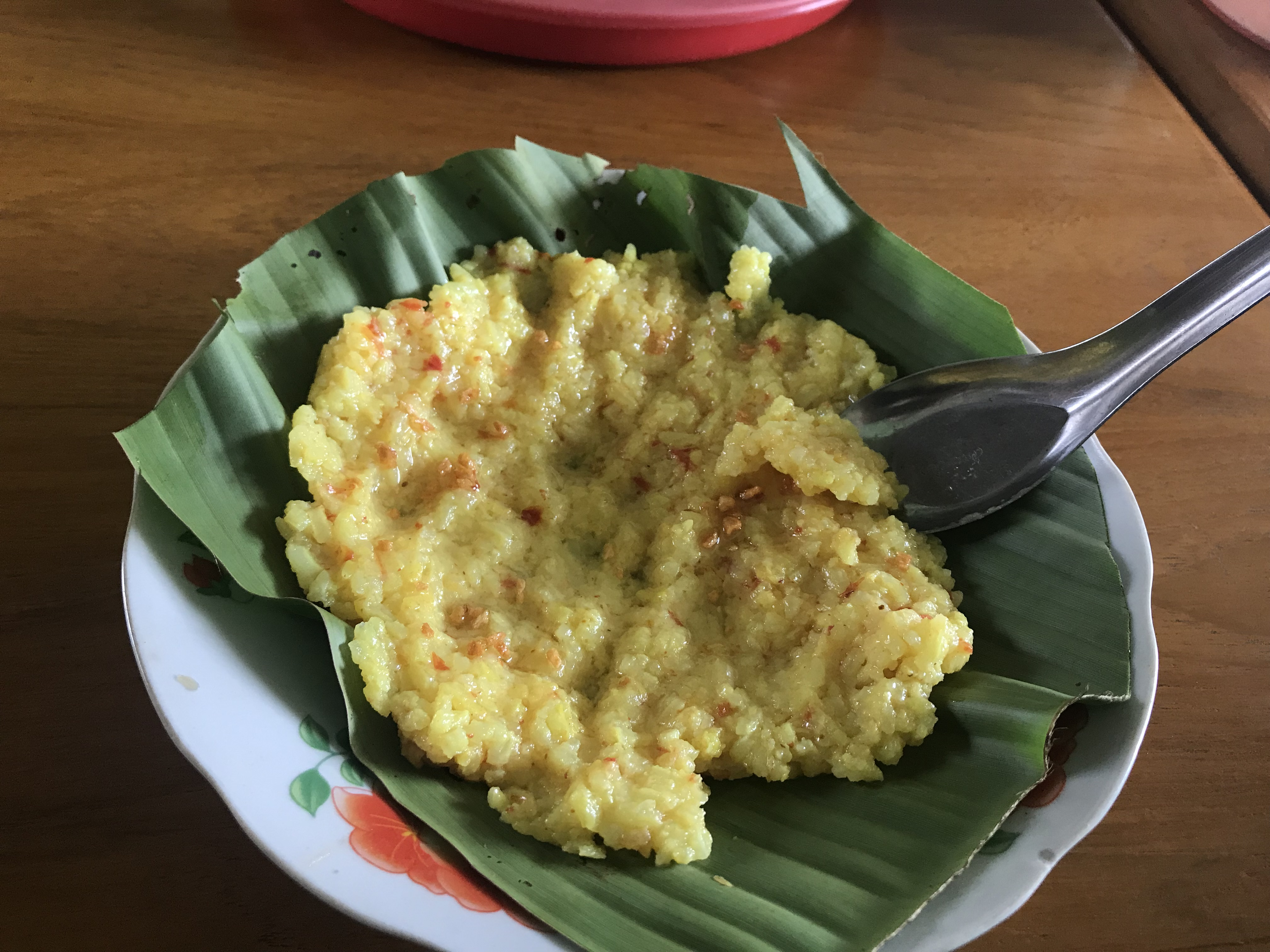
Shan style pounded oily rice served on a banana leaf with garlicky roots

== History ==
The Tai-Shan people are believed to have migrated from Yunnan in China. The Shan are descendants of the oldest branch of the Tai-Shan, known as Tai Luang ('Great Tai') or Tai Yai ('Big Tai'). The Tai-Shan who migrated to the south and now inhabit modern-day Laos and Thailand are known as Tai Noi (or Tai Nyai), while those in parts of northern Thailand and Laos are commonly known as Tai Noi ('Little Tai' – Lao spoken) The Shan have inhabited the Shan Plateau and other parts of modern-day Burma since the 10th century CE. The Shan kingdom of Mong Mao (Muang Mao) existed since the 10th century CE but became a Burmese vassal state during the reign of King Anawrahta of Pagan (1044–1077).

After the Pagan Kingdom fell to the Mongols in 1287, the Shan chiefs rapidly gained control over central Burma. The units that they founded are:

State	Peak territory	Duration	Notes
Myinsaing–Pinya Kingdom (1297–1364)	Central Burma	1297–1364	Founded by three Shan brothers named Athinkhaya, Yazathingyan and Thihathu, and the minor kingdom was a predecessor to Ava Kingdom
Sagaing Kingdom	Central Burma	1315–1364	Thihathu was a co-founder of the Myinsaing Kingdom and the founder of the Pinya Kingdom, and the minor kingdom was a predecessor to Ava Kingdom.
Confederation of Shan States	Upper Burma	1527–1555	A group of Shan States led by Sawlon, Saopha of Mohnyin conquered the Ava Kingdom in 1527 and ruled Upper Burma until 1555
Shan States (Princely states)	Shan States	1215–1885, 1948–1959	Princely Shan States
British Shan States / Federated Shan States	Shan States	1885–1922, 1922–1948	Princely Shan States of British Burma were nominally sovereign princely states, but they were subject to British Crown.

Many Ava and Pegu kings of Burmese history between the 13th–16th centuries were of (partial) Shan descent. The kings of Ava fought kings of Pegu for control of the Irrawaddy valley. A number of Shan states fought Ava for the control of the region of Upper Burma. The states of Monyhin (Mong Yang) and Mogaung were the most capable of the Shan States of the time. The Monhyin-led Confederation of Shan States defeated Ava in 1527, and administered all of Upper Burma from 1527 to 1555.

The Burmese king Bayinnaung conquered the Shan states in 1557. The Shan states became a tributary to Irrawaddy valley based Burmese kingdoms for a while. The Shan Saophas somehow managed to retain a considerable degree of autonomy. Throughout the Burmese feudal era, Shan states supplied much manpower to the Burmese state's objectives. Without Shan manpower, it would have been harder for the Burmans alone to achieve their victories in Lower Burma, Siam, and elsewhere. Shans were a major part of Burmese forces in the First Anglo-Burmese War of 1824–1826, and fought valiantly—a fact the British commanders of the time observed.

In the latter half of the 19th century, the Shan people migrated into Northern Thailand reaching Phrae Province. The Shan population in Thailand is concentrated mainly in Chiang Rai, Chiang Mai, Mae Hong Son, Mae Sariang, Mae Sai and Lampang, where there are groups which settled a long time ago and built Shan communal units and temples. Shan people are known to the North Thai as "Tai Yai", who very seldom use the word Shan to refer to them.

After the Third Anglo-Burmese War in 1885, the British gained control of the Shan states. Under the British colonial administration, the Shan principalities were administered separately as British protectorates with limited monarchical powers invested in the Shan Saophas.

After World War II, the Shan and other ethnic minority leaders negotiated with the majority Bamar leadership at the Panglong Conference, and agreed to gain independence from Britain as part of Union of Burma. The Shan states were given the option to secede after 10 years of independence. The Shan states became Shan State in 1948 as part of the newly independent Burma.

General Ne Win's coup d'état overthrew the democratically elected government in 1962, and abolished the old Shan saopha system.

== Conflict in Shan State ==
Shan conflict
- Part of the Myanmar conflict
Date	21 May 1958 – present
Location	Shan State, Myanmar
Status	ongoing

Belligerents
Myanmar; Tatmadaw; Myanmar Police Force; UWSA (from 1989)	SSA (1964–1975); SURA (1960–1966); MTA (1985–1996); SSNA (1995–2005); Shan State Army – South; PNA; PNLA; LDU; MRDA (1985–2000)	Northern Alliance; AA; KIA; MNDAA; TNLA; SSA-N; WNA; NDAA; KDA (1961–2010); UWSA (until 1989); NDA-K (1989–2009)

Commanders and leaders
(Myanmar) Min Aung Hlaing; (Myanmar) Myint Swe; (Myanmar) Soe Win; (Myanmar) Henry Van Thio; Bao Youxiang	Sao Nang Hearn Kham; Mo Heng; Khun Sa; Kan Yod; Yawd Serk; Khun Okka	Twan Mrat Naing; N'Ban La; Pheung Kya-shin; Tar Aik Bong; Tar Bone Kyaw; U Sai Leun

A Shan independence movement has been active and engaged in armed struggle, leading to intermittent civil war within Burma for decades. Currently two main Shan armed insurgent forces operate within Shan State: the Shan State Army/Special Region 3 and Shan State Army/Restoration Council of Shan State. In 2005 the Shan State National Army (SSNA) was effectively abolished after its surrender to the Burmese government. Some SSNA units joined the SSA/RCSS, which has yet to sign any agreements, and is still engaged in guerrilla warfare against the Burmese Army.

During conflicts, Shan civilians are often burned out of their villages and forced to flee into Thailand. Some of the worst fighting in recent times occurred in 2002 when the Burmese army shelled the Thai border town of Mae Sai, south of Tachileik, in an attempt to capture members of the SSA's Southern Faction who had fled across the Nam Ruak. While in July of that same year, in the Shan Township of Mong Yawng, the killing of a member of an NGO by the Burmese Tatmadaw, and the subsequent closure of the border to Thailand, caused an evacuation of the surviving members across the Mekong River to Laos. This evacuation was aided by members of the Shan State Army, and in turn brought tighter measures restricting foreign aid in the area as violence increased.

Due to the civil war, males typically find low-paid work in construction, while many Shan females fall in the hands of human trafficking gangs and end up in the prostitution business or bride trafficking. Despite the hardships, Shan people in Thailand are conscious of their culture and seek occasions to gather in cultural events.

A major Shan militia called the Mong Tai Army had fought the Tatmadaw as well as the United Wa State Army (UWSA) for a separate state up until their surrender in 1996. Since then, the UWSA has given support to Shan State Army – South and Shan State Army – North out of hope that the two serve as buffers against Tatmadaw encroachment on Wa territory.

=== Communities in exile ===
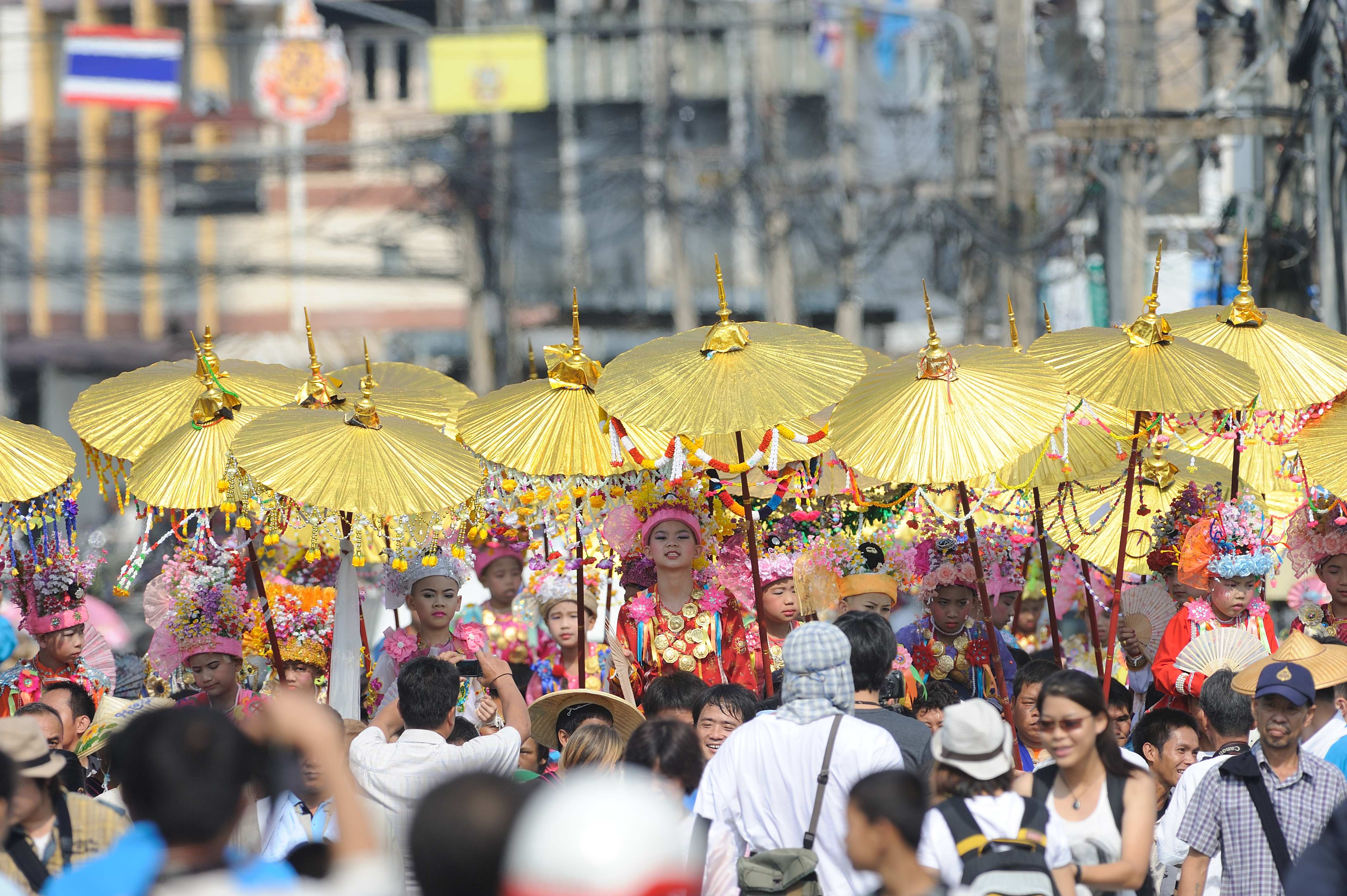
Traditional Poi Sang Long novice ordination festival celebrated by one of the Shan communities in exile in Thailand

Following the arrest of Sao Shwe Thaik of Yawnghwe in the Burmese coup d'état in March 1962 by the Revolutionary Council headed by General Ne Win, his wife Sao Nang Hearn Kham fled with her family to Thailand in April 1962 and Sao Shwe Thaik died in prison in November the same year. In exile, his wife took up the cause of the independence struggle of the Shan State. In 1964 Sao Nang Hearn Kham with her son Chao-Tzang Yawnghwe helped to form the Shan State War Council (SSWC) and the Shan State Army (SSA), becoming chair of the SSWC, and taking the Shan rebellion that started in 1958 to a new phase. Sao Nang Hearn Kham died on 17 January 2003 in exile in Canada at the age of 86.

The declaration of independence was rejected by most other ethnic minority groups, many Shan living inside Burma, and the country's leading opposition party, Aung San Suu Kyi's National League for Democracy. Despite the domestic opposition to the declaration, the Burmese Army is rumoured to have used it as a reason to crack down on Shan civilians. Shan people have reported an increase in restrictions on their movements and an escalation in Burmese Army raids on Shan villages. The October 2015 Burmese military offensive in Central Shan State has displaced thousands of Shan people, as well as Palaung, Lisu and Lahu people, causing a new humanitarian crisis. Shan civil society organisations are concerned about the lack of international response on the recent conflict.

== Notable people ==
- Sao Shwe Thaik, first president of Myanmar
- Sai Wan Leng Kham, Shan politician
- Sao Kya Seng, Shan engineer and politician
- Wutt Hmone Shwe Yi, Burmese actress

== See also ==
- Poy Sang Long
- Tai peoples
- Shan Horse
- Shan Hills
- Saharat Thai Doem
- The Story of a Fairy and a Prince (Shan folktale)
