= Wa National Organisation =

- Abbreviation: WNO
- Formation: 29 July 1974
- Type: Political organisation
- Purpose: Autonomy for the Wa people of Myanmar (Burma)
- Official languages: Wa; Thai; Burmese
- General Secretary: Maj Ta Aik Nyunt
- Vice Chairman: Ta Ma Ha (until 2016)
- Former chairman: Mahasang
- Affiliations: Wa National Army; Wa National Council

The Wa National Organisation (Burmese: ဝအမျိုးသားအစည်းအရုံး; WNO) is a political organisation in Shan State, Myanmar. It has an armed wing, the Wa National Army (WNA), that operates near Myanmar's border with Thailand.

== History ==
The WNO was founded along with the WNA on 29 July 1974, after the original group, the Ka Kwe Ye, joined forces with the Shan State Army (SSA) and Lo Hsing Han. The group was led by Mahasang, the son of the last sawbwa of Vingngun.

In 1977, the WNO broke ties with the SSA and allied themselves with the 3rd Kuomintang battalion operating near the Myanmar-China border, led by General Li Wenhuan. In 1983, the WNO officially joined the National Democratic Front (NDF).

The group signed a peace agreement with the SLORC government in August 1997.

== See also ==
- Internal conflict in Myanmar
- List of insurgent groups in Myanmar
