= Panglong Conference =

1947 meeting in Burma (later Myanmar)

The Panglong Conference (Burmese: ပင်လုံညီလာခံ), held in February 1947, was a historic meeting that took place at Panglong in the Shan States in Burma between the Shan, Kachin and Chin ethnic minority leaders and Aung San, head of the interim Burmese government. Aung Zan Wai, Pe Khin, Bo Hmu Aung, Sir Maung Gyi, Dr. Sein Mya Maung and Myoma U Than Kywe were among the negotiators of the historical Panglong Conference who negotiated with Bamar representative General Aung San and other ethnic leaders in 1947. All these leaders unanimously decided to join the Union of Burma. On the agenda was the united struggle for independence from Britain and the future of Burma after independence as a unified independent republic.

== History ==
Burma has been called an anthropologist's paradise. Various groups of people migrated south into the Irrawaddy–Chindwin, Sittang and Salween valleys from the China–Tibet region in the latter part of the first millennium, the Mon followed by the Tibeto-Burman and Tai-Shan races. The main groups were the Mon, Bamar, Shan and Rakhine, establishing their own kingdoms, and the first three groups vying for supremacy. The Bamar under Anawrahta in the 11th century, Bayinnaung in the 16th century, and Alaungpaya in the 18th century unified and expanded their kingdoms establishing the first, second and third Burmese Empires respectively, whilst the Shan were ascendent during the 14th and the 15th centuries. The ancient Mon kingdom in the south was finally overwhelmed by the Bamar into submission only in the mid-18th century, and the Arakan annexed subsequently, establishing a Bamar-dominant nation state approximately within its current boundaries. Although the Arakan and Monlands were under Bamar administration, the Shanlands and the Trans-Salween states of the Karen and Karenni were never under direct control but only under Burmese suzerainty.

The British fought three wars with Burma in 1824, 1852 and 1885, culminating in the loss of Burmese sovereignty and independence. They established a colonial administration 'at least possible cost' according to Lord Dufferin. A distinction between the hills and the plains also developed that evolved during the arduous annexation process and became formalised into Ministerial Burma, formerly Burma Proper, and the Frontier Areas. During the annexation process there was armed resistance not just from the Bamar but from the Shan, Chin and Kachin. The Shan and Karreni Saophas or Sawbwas, and Kachin Duwas were left to continue their feudatory rule in their areas; the Karenni states were never even included within the borders of British Burma. In parliament, seats were reserved for the Karen, immigrant Chinese, Indian and Anglo-Burmese minorities, an arrangement bitterly opposed by many Burmese politicians. The Mon of Lower Burma and the Rakhine included in Ministerial Burma had no representation at all even though the plains Karen (the majority of the Karen population) and the Mon shared the Irrawaddy Delta of Lower Burma.

The draining of the marshes for rice cultivation drew Burman migration into British Burma even before the final annexation of Upper Burma. The Bamar however were virtually excluded from military service, and even as late as 1939 there were only 432 Burmans in the army compared with 1448 Karens, 886 Chins and 881 Kachins. Karen villagers had acted as guides for the British during the Anglo-Burmese Wars, and Karen troops had played a major part in the suppression of rebellions in Lower Burma in 1886 and again in the Saya San rebellion of 1930-32.

American, British and other European missionaries had also succeeded in converting the hills peoples to Christianity, the Karen in particular, and also the Kachin and Chin, whereas they made very little headway among the Buddhist Bamar, Mon, Rakhine, Shan and the plains Karen. Once they had benefited from a Christian education, Karen migration to towns in Lower Burma and the Tenasserim also increased. Burman leaders would blame the 'divide and rule' policy of Western imperialists and the 'servile streak' in the ethnic minorities who would look up to them; U Nu, the first prime minister of independent Burma, was later to accuse certain missionaries and writers of 'having deliberately sown the seeds of racial and religious conflict'. The ethnic minorities would, in turn, point the finger at Burman 'chauvinism' and 'oppression'.

The Frontier Areas or Scheduled Areas were divided into Part I or Excluded Areas such as the Kachin state with no right of election to parliament, and Part II or Partially Excluded Areas subdivided into two groups, one with electoral representation such as Myitkyina and Bhamo with Kachin minority and Shan/Burman majorities, and the other group with no electoral representation. A Federal Council of Shan Chiefs was formed in 1922 which gave the Shan and their Sawbwas an important channel for representation. The Burma Frontier Service boasted just 40 members employed in the administration of the entire Scheduled Areas at the outbreak of the World War II.

When the Japanese invaded Burma in 1942, the Karen remained loyal to and fought with the British, and consequently suffered at the hands of the Burma Independence Army (BIA) under Gen. Aung San and the Imperial Japanese Army. Villages were destroyed and massacres committed in their areas, and among the victims were Saw Pe Tha, a pre-war cabinet minister, and his family.

== First Panglong conference ==
In March 1946, the Saophas or Chaofa (Sawbwa in Burmese) of the Shan states sponsored a conference at Panglong in order to discuss the future of the Shan states after independence. It was led by the Saopha of Yawnghwe Sao Shwe Thaik, and the Kachin, Chin and Karen representatives were also invited. They realised that Burma would soon gain independence from the British, and that the Frontier Areas faced a real risk of remaining a British dominion since the hill tracts were deemed backward and not yet ready for self-determination. The pre-war prime minister U Saw and Thakin Nu from the Anti-Fascist People's Freedom League (AFPFL) gave speeches as the Burman majority representatives, and a message from the British Governor of Burma was read out which reiterated the White Paper policy that no decisions would be made on the Frontier Areas and their peoples without their full consent.

The Chin delegates expressed their sense of insecurity stemming from their heavy economic dependence on Burma Proper, hence their weak bargaining position. The Kachins were critical of U Nu's diatribe against the British and sceptical of Burman sincerity as regards equal rights. The Karens wanted a separate state that included the Tenasserim seaboard. The one positive outcome was the formation of a United Burma Cultural Society with Sao Shwe Thaik as chairman and U Saw as secretary.

Relations later improved between the hill peoples and the AFPFL through contacts such as the Sama Duwa Sinwa Nawng, a Buddhist Kachin whose father was killed in the fight against British annexation at the turn of the century, and who himself raised Kachin levies and fought with the Burma National Army (BNA) in World War II, also the Chin leader Vamthu Mawng, and the Sawbwa of the Pa-O substate of Hsihseng (Hsahtung or Thaton) Sao Khun Kyi. In November 1946, a Supreme Council of the United Hills Peoples was formed at the instigation of the AFPFL, and Sao Shwe Thaik was elected as president.

The minority leaders however continued to lobby London and the Frontier Areas Administration (FAA) directly at the same time the AFPFL was in almost continuous consultation with the British authorities for independence. The Karen National Associations (KNA), founded in 1881, had argued at the 1917 Montagu–Chelmsford hearings in India that Burma was not "yet in a fit state for self-government" to the dismay of Burmese nationalists, but 3 years later, after submitting a criticism of the 1920 Craddock Reforms, won for themselves 5 (later 12) seats in the Legislative Council of 130 (later 132) members. Sao Shwe Thaik and Sawbwa of Mong Mit Sao Khin Maung travelled to London to argue for an independent Shan state at the Burma Round Table hearings in 1931, despite the British Governor's disapproval. The Karen Goodwill Mission to London in August 1946 likewise failed to receive any encouragement for their separatist demands from the British government.

H. N. C. Stevenson, the director of the FAA, criticised by both the Burma Office and the AFPFL, lamented the lost opportunities, and the lack of economic data or coordination between the Frontier Areas and Ministerial Burma. He stated,"I believe that the multiplication of and strengthening of the economic relations between the hills and the plains will be the shortest and most inexpensive route to a unified Burma."

In Blueprint for a Free Burma, composed by the Japanese military but wrongfully attributed to Aung San, the question of minorities is addressed in similar vein:

the essential prerequisite is the building of one unified nation. In concrete terms it means we must now bridge all gulfs now existing through British machinations between the major Burmese race and the hill peoples, the Arakanese, the Shans and unite all these peoples into one nation with equal treatment unlike the present system which divides our people into "backward" and "administered" sections. All the natural barriers that make mutual associations and contacts shall be overcome, for instance, by construction of effective modern communications such as railways and roads.

== Panglong Agreement ==
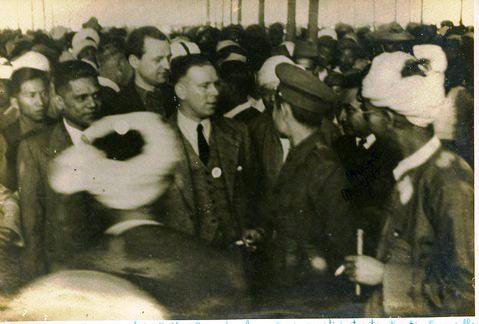
Aung San and Arthur Bottomley at Panglong Conference

A significant breakthrough came when an agreement was signed between the Shan, Kachin and Chin leaders, and Aung San as leader of the Governor's Executive Council at the second Panglong Conference on February 12, 1947. The Karens sent only four observers; also absent were the Mon and Arakanese representatives as they were not considered separately, but within Ministerial Burma. There were 23 signatories in all expressing their willingness to work with the 'interim Burmese government' in order to achieve independence speedily, and agreeing in principle the formation of a 'Union of Burma'.

- The Agreement proposed a Counsellor to the Governor to be appointed and co-opted as a member of the Executive Council, on recommendation by the Supreme Council of United Hills Peoples, in order to deal with the Frontier Areas, thus bringing the subject 'within the purview of the Executive Council', and the Counsellor to be assisted by two deputies who should also be allowed to attend relevant meetings of the EC.
- Full autonomy in internal administration of the Frontier Areas was to be accepted in principle.
- A separate Kachin state was agreed to be desirable, subject to discussion in the Constituent Assembly.
- Citizens of the Frontier Areas were to enjoy the rights and privileges regarded as fundamental in democratic countries.
- The financial autonomy of the Federated Shan States was not to be affected.
- Financial assistance to the Kachin and Chin Hills likewise was not to be affected, and the feasibility of the same arrangement for them as existed with the Shan states to be considered.

The British were left in no doubt that Aung San and the Burman dominated AFPFL were able to mediate with the leaders of the hills peoples. Sao Shwe Thaik was appointed Counsellor to the Governor, with Sinwa Nawng and Vumthu Mawng as his deputies. Aung San's assurance on the day, "If Burma receives one kyat, you will also get one kyat", has often been quoted by ethnic nationalists since.

== Legacy ==
Thanks to the Panglong Agreement, the Union of Burma came into being after independence on January 4, 1948, and February 12 has been celebrated since as 'Union Day'. The spirit of Panglong is often invoked, although many today feel that another Panglong is long overdue. The debate certainly needs to move on from the old black-and-white caricatures of 'imperialist stooges' and 'chauvinist oppressors' for any progress to be made.

Even at the time, there was no representation from the Karen and Karenni, no consideration regarding the Mon and Rakhine as they fell within Ministerial Burma, and the Pa-O, Palaung and Wa were subsumed under the Shan states, although the Saopha of Tawngpeng Palaung substate was among the signatories. The Frontier Areas Commission of Enquiry (FACE) was set up in April/May 1947 as a condition of the Aung San-Attlee Agreement of January 27, 1947, and although the Burmese independence movement was represented by just one united front, the AFPFL, there were 50 often conflicting groups from the hill tracts; the Delta Karen, Mon and Rakhine were still excluded.

The shortcomings of the conference which resurfaced in the Constituent Assembly, and the consequent inadequacies of the Constitution promulgated on September 24, 1947, were to emerge soon after independence, and in fact in the Arakan the veteran monk U Seinda had already started a rebellion in May 1947. The Karen had isolated themselves further by boycotting both the EC and the elections to the Constituent Assembly, notwithstanding seats reserved for them, though persistent in their demand for an independent state similar to the kind their cousins, the Karenni, had enjoyed under their own Sawbwas; their future was as a result left unsettled, deferred till after independence. The Kachin had to make concessions in their representation in parliament in exchange for the inclusion of Myitkyina and Bhamo, towns with Shan and Burman majorities, in the new state, although in the hills the Duwas would continue their rule. The Chin ended up with no state, only a special division. The Mon and Rakhine again were not even considered separately. One Mon group contested unsuccessfully at the elections which they claimed were rigged, but another boycotted; the Mon after independence threw in their lot with the Karen and joined the rebellion.

== Rebellion ==
The Regional Autonomy Enquiry Commission in October 1948, though now expanded to include six Karens, six Mons, five Arakanese, seven Burmans and four others, did not report until February 1949, by which time the Karen rebellion had already broken out. The Karen had repeated their controversial demand to include Karen majority areas of the Irrawaddy Delta in the independent Karen state as well as a joint Mon–Karen independent state in the areas of the Tenasserim where they could not stake an exclusive claim.

Communal relations turned sour when the AFPFL government deployed Karen and Kachin troops, which proved to be ruthlessly efficient, in suppressing the Burmese Communist rebellion that started in March 1948 centred on their stronghold of Pyinmana. The situation went from bad to worse when U Nu raised the Sitwundan auxiliary troops in order to reduce the government's heavy dependence on ethnic troops, and not least in anticipation of a Karen insurrection. They were put under the command of Maj. Gen. Ne Win and not the Army Chief of Staff Gen. Smith Dun, a Karen who was later removed and replaced by Ne Win on January 31, 1949. They soon outnumbered the Karen Rifles and Union Military Police (UMP), and were subsequently used against the Karen National Defence Organisation (KNDO), a paramilitary force formed in July 1947 by the Karen National Union (KNU), and the Karen UMP units.

History repeated itself when the KNU was judged to be a separatist movement as an 'imperialist plot' at the Left Unity talks in July/August 1948 between the AFPFL and the PVO (Pyithu yèbaw or People's Volunteer Organisation, a paramilitary force formed earlier by Aung San from BIA veterans) and their allies the Communists. A gun-running plot had been uncovered involving an Anglo-Burmese officer, Capt. Vivian, who was convicted and jailed but later escaped with the Karen; he was linked to U Saw who was in the frame for the assassination of Aung San and six other cabinet members in July 1947. Another plot led by Col. Cromarty-Tulloch, an ex-Force 136 adventurer, and a few other Britons and Anglo-Burmese officers, in the early days of the Karen insurrection, was also uncovered shortly after it started. Naw Seng, a commander of the Kachin Rifles, after being dispatched to suppress the Karen revolt, joined the KNDO whose ranks now swelled from the defection of the Karen Rifles; he then went on to lead the Pawng Yawng rebellion before going into exile to China in 1950, only to make a comeback in 1968 as a Communist commander.

It was not just the Karen and Mon that rose up in rebellion, soon after independence in early 1949. The Rakhine led by the veteran monk U Seinda started an insurrection as early as 1946 followed by the Rakhine Mujahid in December 1947 in northern Arakan along the border of modern Bangladesh, migrants and their descendants from East Bengal. The Karenni revolt however was precipitated by a Baptist-Catholic split in its leadership in August 1948, when the veteran leader Bee Tu Re was brutally murdered, and as a result the Kyebogyi Sawbwa Sao Shwe took up arms against the AFPFL-backed Kantarawaddy Sawbwa Sao Wunna, both ex-Force 136 and erstwhile comrades-in-arms, and Sao Shwe was later aided by Tulloch.

But it was not until 1949 when the Karen attacked Rangoon, triggered by the broken promise of independence. and after a brief battle both sides agreed to a cease fire and after receiving promises that the Burmese government would reconsider their requests, returned home. Nothing was done to implement these promises under Ne Win's interim Government. Then in the early 1960s the Kachin rebelled, triggered by the former Marxist U Nu's declaration of Buddhism as state religion, and the Shan rebellion, triggered by Gen. Ne Win's coup d'etat of March 1962, took off. In fact it was the Shan Federal Movement, led by Sao Shwe Thaik and aspiring to a 'loose' federation with Burma, but seen by army hardliners as a separatist movement insisting on the government honouring the right to secession after 10 years provided for by the 1947 Constitution of Burma to both the Shan and the Karenni, which precipitated the coup. Ne Win had already stripped the Sawbwas of their feudal powers in exchange for comfortable pensions for life in 1959 during his caretaker government. His 1962 coup put paid to the 1947 Constitution and what little remained of the Panglong spirit. The Chin launched a rebellion also in the 1960s. The Kayan insurgency in the Shan substate of Mong Pai was triggered by the first 'demonetization' declaring the 100 and 50 kyat notes illegal in 1964 which wiped out the savings of hill farmers as well as the rest of the country. The Shan rebellion was partially caused by the CIA who armed them in cooperation with the Chinese Kuomintang forces that fought with General Stilwell in the War against Japan and remained in the region. The latter were removed by the USA after being ordered by the UN and flew some of the Kuomintang to Formosa.

== Personal journeys ==
Aung San was assassinated with several members of his cabinet, including Sao Sarm Htun, the Saopha of Mong Pawng and a signatory of the Agreement, and a Karen member Mahn Ba Khaing, on July 19, 1947, just months after Panglong and before independence; July 19 has been commemorated since as 'Martyrs' Day'. U Saw was convicted and hanged in May 1948 for his role in the crime. The Socialist leader Thakin Nu became the first Prime Minister of independent Burma as a direct consequence of Aung San's untimely death and the earlier expulsion of the Burmese Communists from the AFPFL. Sao Shwe Thaik was elected the first President of independent Burma (1948–52), arrested at the time of the 1962 coup when his youngest son was the one fatality, shot dead, in what was generally described as a 'bloodless' coup, and he himself died shortly afterwards in custody. His wife Mahadevi Sao Nang Hearn Kham and son Chao-Tzang Yawnghwe formed the Shan State Army (SSA) in 1964 taking the Shan rebellion that started in 1958 to a new phase.

Sinwa Nawng and Vamthu Mawng both became cabinet ministers in the first AFPFL government. Brang Seng, the late Chairman of the Kachin Independence Organisation (KIO) and former headmaster of Myitkyina Baptist Mission High School, was the nephew of one of the Kachin signatories Lawdan ''Duwa'' Zau La. Khun Kya Nu, a leader of the SSA and former Rangoon University student, is the son of one of the Shan delegates at Panglong, Kya Bu.
