= Wa National Army =

Insurgent group in Myanmar

- ဝအမျိုးသားတပ်မတော်
- Leaders: Mahasang; Lu Mong
- Dates active: 29 July 1974 – present
- Active regions: Shan State; Myanmar–Thailand border
- Ideology: Wa nationalism Separatism
- Size: 200
- Part of: Wa National Organisation
- Wars: the Internal conflict in Myanmar

The Wa National Army (Burmese: ဝအမျိုးသားတပ်မတော်; abbreviated WNA) is an insurgent group that operates in Shan State, Myanmar (Burma), near Myanmar's border with Thailand. It is the armed wing of the Wa National Organisation (WNO).

== History ==
The WNA was founded along with the WNO on 29 July 1974, after the original group, a Ka Kwe Ye, joined forces with the Shan State Army (SSA) and Lo Hsing Han. The group was led by Mahasang, the son of the last sawbwa of Vingngun.

In 1977, the WNA broke ties with the SSA and allied themselves with the 3rd Kuomintang battalion operating near the Myanmar-China border, led by General Li Wenhuan. In 1983, the WNA's political wing, the Wa National Organisation, officially joined the National Democratic Front (NDF).

In the 1980s, the WNA operated in northern Shan State, near the Myanmar-Thailand border, but not in the mountainous areas of the region, which were under the control of the Communist Party of Burma until 1989.

In August 1997, the WNA signed a peace agreement with the military junta government.

After Maha Sang died in 2007, the WNA came under the control of the United Wa State Army. Colonel Lu Mong stated to the Australian Broadcasting Corporation in 2024 that the UWSA and WNA "are the same group."

== See also ==
- Shan State Army
- United Wa State Army
