= Aung Zan Wai =

Arakanese politician

- အောင်ဇံဝေ

Minister for Social Services

Personal details
- Born: 19 November 1893 Kyauktaw, Mrauk-U District, British Burma (Now Myanmar)
- Died: 29 December 1984 (aged 91) Yangon
- Citizenship: Myanmar
- Party: Anti-Fascist People's Freedom League
- Spouse(s): Sabai Phyu; San Thar Nu
- Education: St. Paul's High School, Rangoon; Mahabodhi College, Colombo
- Occupation: Politician
- Known for: Panglong Agreement negotiator

Aung Zan Wai (Burmese: အောင်ဇံဝေ; 19 November 1893 – 29 December 1984) was an Arakanese politician and one of the most important negotiators and leaders of the historical Panglong Conference in 1947. The signing of Panglong Agreement is now celebrated as a national holiday, Union Day, in Myanmar.

== Early life ==
He was born in Kyauktaw, Mrauk-U District, British Burma in 19 November 1893. He was an ethnic Rakhine.

== Politics ==
He joined an Arakanese Team called Rakhapura in 1918 as he started getting involved in politics, and worked as a Team Secretary. He used to be the member of General Council of Burmese Associations (GCBA) as well. Later he founded the English-Burmese middle school in Kyauktaw and worked as a Headmaster.

In 1936, he was chosen as a Lower House Senator from Sittwe. Also he worked as a secretary at the Ministry of Law and Justice. In 1945, he joined Anti-Fascist People's Freedom League. He also worked as an adviser for the establishment of Panglong Conference in 1947. Then he participated as a minister in the Ministry of Health and Social Service which was part of the Council of Governor Sir Hubert Rance where General Aung San was the Chairman.

He participated in Panglong Conference together with other leaders and Myanmar Representatives who were the leader, General Aung San, Sir Maung Kyi, Dr. Sein Mya Maung, Myoma U Than Kywe, Tin Tut, Bo Khin Maung Kalay, Thakin Watin, Bo Aung, Bo Min Lwin, Ko Ko Lay, Bo Thein Swe, Tin Nyunt and Maung Maung.

== After the war ==
After Myanmar was independent, he was assigned as a minister of the Ministry of Social Work and Health when he was chosen as a member of Chamber of Deputies represented for Sittwe. Then he performed as a minister of Ethnic Affairs in 1949. In 1970, he was a member in a committee formed to celebrate the Golden Jubilee of National Day of Myanmar.

== Assassination ==
He survived from the attack when General Aung San and other ministers were assassinated on 19 July 1947.

== Death ==
He died on 29 December 1984 in Rangoon and left his second wife, San Thar Nu, three daughters and a son.
