= Than Swe (historian) =

Burmese historian

His Excellency Than Swe
- မောင်သန်းဆွေ

Deputy Minister of Culture of Myanmar
- In office 2012–2015

Vice-chairman of the Myanmar History Commission
- In office ?–?

Personal details
- Born: 28 November 1941 (age 84) Tavoy, Tenasserim Division, Japanese Burma (now Dawei, Myanmar)
- Parent(s): U Su (father); Shwe Shwe (mother)
- Education: University of Rangoon
- Occupation: Historian, writer, minister

Than Swe (Burmese: သန်းဆွေ; born 28 November 1941) is a Burmese historian, writer, and a former deputy Minister of Culture of Myanmar. He writes under the pen name Maung Than Swe (Dawei) (မောင်သန်းဆွေ (ထားဝယ်)). He is known for his writings on Burmese history, specializing on the Konbaung period. His well-known works include Konbaung Shindan (Discourse on the Konbaung Period) and Konbaung Alun (Beyond Konbaung). He has published over 50 books during his career. He has also served as vice-chairman of the Myanmar History Commission. In 2013, he won the Thuta Swezon Literature Award for history with the book Hti Thadin, Nan Thadin.

== Works ==
Over 50 books including:

- Ratnagiri Khayi-the (Ratnagiri Traveller)
- The Royal Audiences
- Konbaung Alun (Beyond Konbaung)
- Konbaung Shindan (Discourse on the Konbaung Period)
- Nanmadaw Me Nu Shindan (Discourse on Queen Nanmadaw Me Nu)
- The Moon Princess Sao Sanda (ကမ္ဘောဇ မင်းသမီးလေး စဝ်စန္ဒာ)
- Hna-lon-tha San-Ein (The Love Story of Katya & the Prince of Siam)
- Hti Thadin, Nan Thadin ("Palace News")
