= Sai Wan Leng Kham =

Burmese Politician

Member of the Amyotha Hluttaw
- Incumbent
- Assumed office 1 February 2016
- Constituency: Shan State No.3

Personal details
- Born: 5 August 1981 (age 44) Theinni, Shan State, Burma (Myanmar)
- Party: Shan Nationalities League for Democracy
- Spouse: Nan Khan San
- Parent(s): Ywut Kham (father); Nan Hnin Sein (mother)
- Education: Second Year History

Sai Wan Leng Kham (Burmese: စိုင်းဝမ်းလှိုင်းခမ်း, born 5 August 1981) is a Burmese politician who currently serves as a House of Nationalities member of parliament for Shan State № 3 constituency.

== Early life and education ==
He was born on 5 August 1981 in Theinni, Shan State, Burma (Myanmar).

== Political career ==
He is a member of the Shan Nationalities League for Democracy. In the 2015 Myanmar general election, he was elected as an Amyotha Hluttaw MP and elected representative from Shan State № 3 parliamentary constituency.
