= Sao Nang Hearn Kham =

Mahadevi Sao Nang Hearn Kham စောဝ်နန်းဟိန်ခမ်
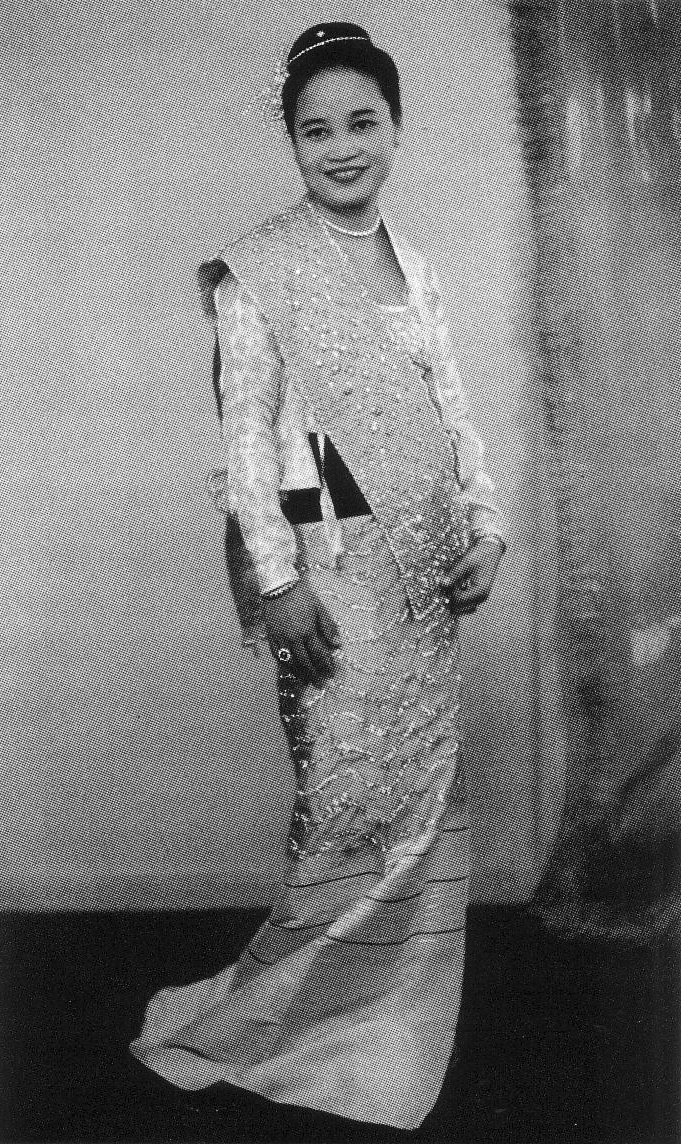
- Mahadevi Sao Nang Hearn Kham in London at the wedding of Princess Elizabeth in 1947

Queen consort of Yawnghwe
- Reign: September 1936 – 2 March 1962
- Born: 26 May 1916; Hsenwi, North Hsenwi
- Died: 17 January 2003 (aged 86); Canada
- Spouse: Sao Shwe Thaik
- Issue: Hso Khan Pha; Hso Lern Fa
- Dynasty: North Hsenwi
- Father: Hkun Hsang Ton Hong

First Lady of Myanmar
- In office January 4, 1948 – March 12, 1952
- Appointed by: President of Myanmar
- President: Sao Shwe Thaik
- Prime Minister: U Nu
- Preceded by: Office Started
- Succeeded by: Mya May

Sao Nang Hearn Kham (Burmese: စောဝ်နန်းဟိန်ခမ်; 26 May 1916 – 17 January 2003) was the Mahadevi of Yawnghwe one of the most important Shan States. Her husband Sao Shwe Thaik was the 23rd and last Saopha of Yawnghwe and became the first President of Burma and she became the first First Lady of Myanmar.

She is an important figure in Shan history and was known as the "Rebel Queen" being the leader of the Shan State War Council. Sao Nang Hearn Kham was the only woman in the history of Burma to have held both the position of queen consort and first lady.

== Life ==
She was born as Hearn Kham on 26 May 1916 at Hsenwi Palace in Hsenwi, Northern Shan State, as the daughter of 65th Saopha Khun Hsang Ton Hong of North Hsenwi. Her brother would be the 66th and last Saopha of the state.

Sao Nang Hearn Kham was the fourth wife of the last ruler of Yawhghwe Saopha Sao Shwe Thaik, who became the first President of Burma and with whom she had six children. Together with her husband, she participated in the 1946–1947 Pang Long Agreement. In post-independence Burma, she became an MP for the constituency of Hsenwi between 1956 and 1960 and became known for her active role in parliament under the administration of the prime minister U Nu. She presented to the parliament the proposal for the Shan rulers to relinquish power.

Her husband was arrested in the Burmese coup d'état in March 1962 by the Revolutionary Council headed by General Ne Win, and one of her sons, who was 17 at that time, was killed in the military coup, apparently the only casualty on the day of the disturbances. She fled with her family to Thailand in October 1963 after her husband had died in prison in November 1962. While in exile, she participated in the independence struggle of the Shan State. In 1964, Sao Nang Hearn Kham, together with her son Chao-Tzang Yawnghwe, helped to form the Shan State War Council (SSWC) and the Shan State Army (SSA), becoming Chairwoman of the SSWC.

Sao Nang Hearn Kham died on 17 January 2003 in exile in Canada at the age of 86.

== See also ==
- North Hsenwi, whose royal family Hearn Kham belonged to.
- Internal conflict in Burma (section Shan State)
