= Shan State Army =

1964–1975 insurgent group in Myanmar

- ရှမ်းပြည်တပ်မတော်
- Flag of the Shan State Army
- Leader: Sao Nang Hearn Kham
- Dates active: 1964–1975
- Split to: Shan State Army (RCSS); Shan State Army (SSPP)
- Headquarters: Shan State, Myanmar
- Ideology: Shan nationalism Separatism; Shan independence
- Wars: the internal conflict in Myanmar

Emblem based on the flag used later in uniforms of different Shan groups.

The Shan State Army (Burmese: ရှမ်းပြည်တပ်မတော်; abbreviated SSA) was one of the largest insurgent groups that fought government forces in Shan State, Myanmar (Burma). The SSA was founded in 1964 after the merging of two existing insurgent groups.

The SSA recruited and trained thousands of local Shan people to join their ranks. Although their initial purpose was to fight for autonomy in Shan State, their battle had extended to fighting against the Communist Party of Burma (CPB), Kuomintang soldiers sponsored by the CIA in Myanmar, and opium smugglers in Shan State. The SSA however, could not fulfill its goals, and in 1976 it dissolved. It would later become the basis for the Shan State Army - North and the Shan State Army - South, but the SSA was not directly linked to either group.

== History ==
Resistance by the Shan State can be traced back to the pre-colonial period, when the Shan kingdoms, once largely independent, fell under the power of a Burmese conqueror, Bayinnaung in 1555. Since then, Shan had tributary relations with Burman rulers; however, it was never directly ruled by them.

Since the British rule in 1886, Shan rulers were placed under the direct rule of the Governor of British India as separate sovereignty. As Shan rulers had full control of its internal matters, many recall the period of British rule as a “Golden Age”. However, when the Government of Burma Act 1921 was passed, the question as to where Shan principalities and other peripheral areas would belong arose. The British decided to transfer these areas to the Governor of Burma and grouped the principalities together to form the Federated Shan States in 1922. Their status was largely degraded from an almost sovereignty to a tax-paying sub-province of Burma.

In 1941, Aung San left Burma for Japan with his colleagues, and received military training by the Imperial Japanese Army to fight against the British. He returned in 1942 with the Japanese Army and successfully pushed the British away to India. In 1945, he went against the Japanese under the Anti-Fascist People's Freedom League (AFPFL). After the war ended, the Burmese insisted on the amalgamation of the ethnic groups and independence, and engaged on strikes. Devastated by the war themselves, the British signed an agreement in 1947, promising its independence within a year. Shan State's political status was further degraded from a sub-province to a “tribal area under direct bureaucratic rule”.

Burma's independence was accepted by the London Agreement, which Aung San signed in 1947. In terms of the borderland states, clause 8 was provided for the “early unification of the Frontier Areas with Ministerial Burma” and a Frontier Areas Commission of Enquiry (FACE) was to be set up to hear the wishes of the non-Burmese ethnic groups. On 12 February, Aung San invited the ethnic groups and held a Panglong Conference to agree on their equal rights, which was only signed by Shan, Kachin, Chin and Karenni. The agreement was that the right of self-government and full autonomy was recognized for Shan and Karenni and autonomous status for Kachin and Chin area. Regarding this conference, Chao Tzang Yawnghwe, a former SSA soldier, writes in his memoir that “it was a rubber-stamp providing Britain with an opportunity to abdicate all responsibilities with respect to the Frontier Areas”. Although the ethnic groups that signed the agreement trusted in Aung San, they were not satisfied with it. The trust did not last long, as Aung San was assassinated on 19 July, the same year.

On 4 January 1948, Burma became independent and was ruled by a civilian government led by U Nu. After almost 60 years of British rule, however, it was not in peace, as uprisings by ethnic groups as well as communists erupted. Ethnic groups demanded for succession and independence, as well as autonomy, equal rights and federal democracy within the Union of Burma. Until the late 1950s, the signatories of the Panglong Agreement- Shan, Kachin, Karenni and Chin- cooperated with U Nu. However, uprisings among ethnic groups continued. Within Shan State, there was the Pa-O of southern Shan state who began as a group supporting the Karen, but later by early 1950s became a movement against the Shan princes. Meanwhile, Chinese Nationalists (KMT) forces encamped on eastern Shan after being retreated from China. They built up strong forces with the assistance of the United States, which alerted the Burma Army units to be sent into the Shan State.

AFPFL was breaking up internally in the late 1950s and the military started to show its growing power. In 1958, the head of Burma Army, General Ne Win, took power and started a military rule to restore order to the continuous uprisings. During this time, the first Shan resistance organization, Noom Suk Harn, attracted several Shan student activists from Rangoon University. The first fight between these Shan rebels and the Burma Army was in 1959, when Shan resistance groups captured the town Tangyan, and after a week of fierce battle, the rebels scattered into small armed bands all over Shan State. Former university students broke away from Noom Suk Harn and established Shan State Independence Army (SSIA) in 1961, together with Shan National United Front (SNUF).

Elections were held in 1960 and Prime Minister U Nu came back in power. However, this was short-lived, as on 2 March 1962, General Ne Win came back in power by a coup d’état and continued his military rule. Before the coup d’état, U Nu called ethnic leaders for a meeting to discuss federalism and ethnic rights; however, the next day of the coup, U Nu and other ethnic leaders, including Shan leaders, were arrested. Ne Win thought that federalism would break the union, therefore, did not allow it to happen. Nevertheless, Ne Win called for peace talks with the Shan state rulers in 1963. However, opposition groups did not agree with the military rule which had no plurality in politics and united all groups under Burmese government, therefore, the fight continued.

== Formation of SSA ==
=== Process ===
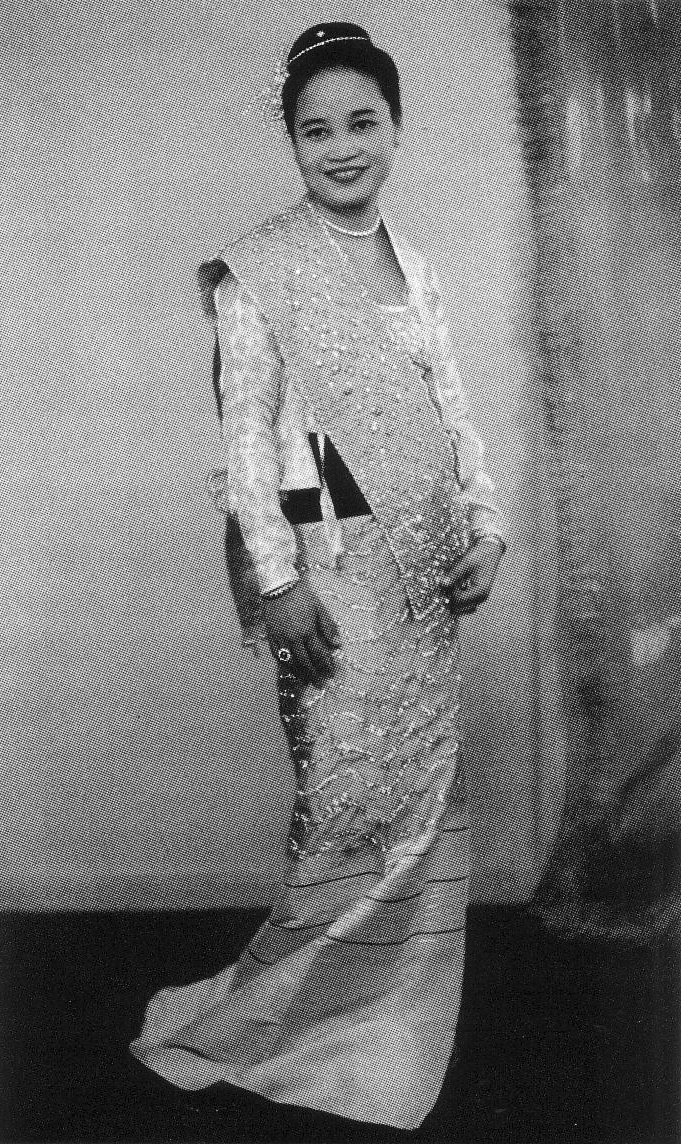
Sao Nang Hearn Kham in 1947

By 1964, there were four major Shan State rebel groups:

- Noom Suk Harn: established in 1958, as the first Shan resistance organization.
- Shan State Independence Army (SSIA): established in 1961.
- Shan National United Front (SNUF): established jointly with SSIA.
- Thailand National Army (TNA): established in 1963 by a faction which broke away from SSIA.

Following the arrest of Sao Shwe Thaik of Yawnghwe in the Burmese coup d'état in March 1962 by the Revolutionary Council headed by General Ne Win, his wife, Sao Nang Hearn Kham (Mahadevi of Yawnghwe) fled with her family to Thailand in April 1962. Sao Shwe Thaik died in prison in November the same year and while in exile his wife participated in the independence struggle of the Shan State. In 1964, Sao Nang Hearn Kham became the leader of SSIA and tried to unify the four rebel factions. However, she could not make Noom Suk Harn and TNA agree for unification, therefore, SNUF merged with SSIA and formed Shan State Army (SSA). The formation took place at the headquarters of SSIA in the mountains near the Thai border. It aimed to expand its forces to a statewide organization by incorporating other rebel groups.

Since its formation, SSA had attracted widespread intellectual and rural support. In 1961, there were no more than 1,500 Shan rebels in total, which by 1969 grew to 7,000 to 9,000. The battles were so fierce that in 1978 20 to 30 casualties were suffered daily by the group in Shan State alone. SSA eventually established four large base areas across Shan state, north to south and on the west to the bank of Salween River.

=== Organisation ===
The highest organ of SSA was the Shan State War Council (SSWC), which composed of:

- Chairman: Sao Nang Hearn Kham, Mahadevi of Yawnghwe
- Vice-chairman and Chief of staff: Moherng of Laikha and Muang Kung area (Former commander of Noom Suk Harn and broke away to form SNUF)
- Vice chief of staff: Sai Pan, Khun Thawa and Jimmy Yang (or Chao Ladd, who joined in 1966)
- Other members: Sai Myint Aung

As fighters, local Shan people were recruited. A leadership school was set up in 1969 and taught basic geography and history, basic government, the fundamentals of military organization and operations, intelligence gathering and reporting, political system and theories, and an introduction to international politics.

In 1971, the Army’s political wing, Shan State Progress Party (SSPP) was formed to tackle the problems the SSA faced. The Shan Unity Preparatory Committee (SUPC) was also formed to unite other Shan rebel groups. It planned to merge SSA with SSA/East, which TNA renamed itself, and the Shan National Independence Army (SNIA), which Noom Suk Harn renamed itself. However, it did not work out, as SNIA collapsed, and its leader set up a new organization to fight against communism.

=== Non-Shan Formations ===
- 5th and 6th Battalions of the 1st Brigade (Palaung National Front)
- 5th Brigade (Kokang Revolutionary Force)

== Other fights ==
=== Against communists ===
Communist Party of Burma (CPB) have been active along the borders of Kachin and Shan with China since 1967. They became a threat to the SSA from the early 1970s, as they operated exclusively in the lowlands and delta regions and by the mid-1970s, it had occupied the town on Shan-Chinese border, Kiu-khok or Wanting, and other places, in total 15,000 square miles of the Shan State. As holding a position of anti-communist and pro-West, SSA leaders saw the expanding forces of CPB as a problem.

As the Burma Army was also fighting against CPB, it came up with a policy in 1963 to combat them by using forces of the ethnic groups on the borders, which was called Ka-kew-ye (KKY) policy. This was to call local rebels to join the KKY forces to fight off CPB, and in return, would be permitted to engage in cross-border trade with Thailand and Laos. Many units of SSA defected to this policy, which led to an internal division in the beginning of the 1970s. By August 1968, 1,500 insurgents shifted to KKY forces and eventually over 20 KKY units were formed. As the policy boosted drug trade along the borders and increased international criticism against it, KKY policy was abandoned in 1973.

Although most Shan rebels were anti-communists, smaller rebel groups, such as Shan Nationalities People's Liberation Organisation (SNPLO), trained with the CPB and adopted communist ideologies.

=== Relationship with ex-KMT merchant-warlords and armies ===
After Mao Zedong took power in 1949, KMT troops fled to northern Burma and started to establish bases in Shan state with the support of the United States, without permission by the Burmese government. These bases served various purposes, such as “listening posts for Taiwanese and American intelligence from which agents were sent into China; opium storage and refining centres; opium buying stations; storage and distribution points for contraband goods; and private fiefdoms of local commanders”. They occupied about one-third or around 20,000 square miles of Shan state. Many Shan rebels worked with them, and in return obtained arms and ammunition and funds. The business by ex-KMT merchants has still left its legacy in Shan State, as Burma is the number two opium producer in the world. Armed forces, such as the Burma Army and Shan resistance groups, as well as local villagers, are engaged in production and trafficking of narcotics.

=== Opium trade ===
Shan State has a vast share of opium production and in 1974, it produced a third of illegal opium in the world. With concerns towards the growing opium in the black market and increasing addiction among local villagers, SSA announced proposals to tackle opium trade in Shan State.

The first was "The 1973 Proposals by the Shan State Army (SSA) with Lo Hsing Han". Here, it proposed that illegal opium trade should be terminated under international supervision, for example inviting the United States Narcotics Bureau. Shan State sought to find different agro-economic methods to replace opium production under democracy, therefore, asked international support for its resistance against the military regime.

Another proposal was "The 1975 Proposals by the Shan State Army jointly with the Shan United Army (SUA) and Shan State Army (East)". It showed concerns to the widespread addiction among Shan people as well as throughout the world. It stressed that opium trade flourishes under anarchism, which explained the situation in Shan State during the time, and proposes that illegal opium trade will end under a democratic government.

In addition, SSA cooperated with Adrian Cowell's film, "The Warlords of the Golden Triangle" & "The Opium War" for its purpose to expose the situation of the opium trade in Shan State and call for end to military government, which SSA believed will also end illegal opium trade.

Despite these efforts by SSA, nothing effective had been done. Chao Tzang Yawnghwe deplores in his memoir, "I cannot but feel that very few people are genuinely interested in seeking a solution especially when governments and international agencies have shown very little willingness to tackle the problem at its source, that is, in Shan State." He also explains the situation as "a goose that lays golden eggs-- enriching, on the one hand, the drug syndicates and traffickers and on the other providing multi-national and international bureaucracies with more jobs, funds and good living."

== Dissolution ==
As the struggle became fierce in the Shan State, SSA units in the north approached CPB for support, which CPB responded with military training and arms provision. On the other hand, the SSA in southern Shan opposed to the alliance with CPB, therefore, led to an internal split in SSA- the north and the south. There were further internal divisions, such as in 1966 two units breaking away and setting up their own nationalist front, and external pressures for not being able to unite Shan rebels as more fights intensified with the Burma Army, CPB, other rebels and drug trade. As a result, SSA collapsed in the mid-1976. About 4,000 soldiers switched loyalty to the CPB and others joined other rebel forces. Later, SSPP reformed a pro-communist army known as Shan State Army-North (SSA-N) and continued its fight, until the fall of CPB in 1989, when it signed the ceasefire agreement with the Burmese government. In opposition to ceasefire, a faction that broke away formed Shan State Army-South (SSA-S), or Restoration Council of Shan State/ Shan State Army in 1996. However, in 2011 SSA-S signed a ceasefire agreement with the Burmese government. Although the Burmese government accomplished in signing a ceasefire with two of the largest armed rebel forces in the Shan State, there still has been reports of clashes. According to the Shan Human Rights Foundation, in October 2014, shells were fired in villages of Shan State, which caused over 180 villagers to evacuate. Between 1996 and 2001, there have been reports of 173 sexual assaults in Shan state by Burmese troops and between 1996 and 1998, 300,000 villagers had relocated.

== See also ==
- Shan people
- Independence struggle of the Shan State
- Internal conflict in Burma (section Shan State)
- Panglong Conference
- Communist Party of Burma
- List of ethnic groups in Burma
