= Sao Shwe Thaik =

First president of Myanmar from 1948 to 1952

Agga Maha Thray Sithu Agga Maha Thiri Thudhamma Sao Shwe Thaik Saopha of Yawnghwe
- စဝ်ရွှေသိုက်
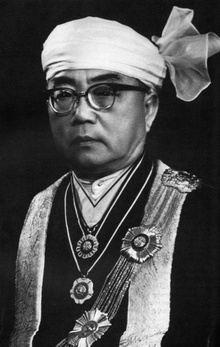
- Shwe Thaik in 1948

Speaker of the Chamber of Nationalities
- In office 1952–1960

1st President of Burma
- In office 4 January 1948 – 16 March 1952 titled "Provisional President"
- Preceded by: George VI (as the King of British Burma); Hubert Rance (as Governor of British Burma)
- Succeeded by: Ba U

Saopha of Yawnghwe
- Reign: 8 March 1929–2 March 1962
- Predecessor: Sao Maung
- Successor: None (abolished)

Personal details
- Born: 16 October 1895 Yawnghwe, British Raj
- Died: 21 November 1962 (aged 67) Rangoon, Burma
- Party: AFPFL
- Spouse(s): Sao Nang Yi; Sao Nang Sanda; Sao Nyunt May; Sao Nang Hearn Kham; Sao Mya Win
- Children: Hso Khan Pha; Sao Sanda
- Parent: Sir Sao Maung
- Education: Shan Chiefs School, Taunggyi

Sao Shwe Thaik (Shan: ၸဝ်ႈၶမ်းသိူၵ်ႈ, Tsaw³ Kham⁴soek³; Burmese: စဝ်ရွှေသိုက်, Burmese pronunciation: [saʔ ʃwè θaiʔ]; 16 October 1895 – 21 November 1962) was a Burmese politician who served as the first president of the Union of Burma and the last Saopha of Yawnghwe.

== Early life ==
Born on 16 October 1895 in the British Raj, (Note: His birth year is reported as either 1894 or 1896. (Seekins 2006: 410–411) gives 1894. (Sarpay Beikman 1952) says that he was born on 16 October 1896 in the Burmese year of 1257. But both cannot be true since 1257 ME lasted between 15 April 1895 and 14 April 1896, and 16 October 1896 fell in 1258 ME; thus, he was born either on 16 October 1895 (14th waning of Thadingyut 1257 ME), or a year later on 16 October 1896 (10th waxing of Thadingyut 1258 ME). His name Shwe Thaik, assuming he was named according to traditional Burmese naming customs, suggests he was born on a Wednesday. Since 16 October 1895 was a Wednesday and 16 October 1896 was a Friday, he was probably born on Wednesday, 16 October 1895.) Shwe Thaik was educated at the Shan Chiefs School in Taunggyi. He then entered British military service during World War I, and also served in the Northeast Frontier Service from 1920–1923. In September 1927, he was chosen as successor to his uncle as saopha of Yawnghwe by the Federated Shan States' Council of Ministers. He officially assumed office on 8 March 1929.

== President ==
Having been elected by the Constituent Assembly of Burma, Sao Shwe Thaik became the Provisional President of the Union of Burma on 4 January 1948 at its independence, served as the head of state until 16 March 1952. The following is his first presidential address to the nation on the day of independence, 4 January 1948.

== Speaker of the Chamber of Nationalities ==
After this term as president, he was the speaker of the Chamber of Nationalities, the upper house, from 1950 to 1962. In the military coup of March 1962, he was arrested by the Revolutionary Council of the Union of Burma headed by General Ne Win and died in prison in November 1962. One of his sons, 17 at that time, was killed in the March 1962 military coup, apparently the only casualty on the day of the coup. The military allowed a funeral to be held for Thaik.

== Personal life ==
Sao Nang Hearn Kham was one of Thaik's wives and fled to Thailand in October 1963. Sao Nang Hearn Kham, who served a member of parliament for Hsenwi from 1956 to 1960, was Thaik's consort.

== Works cited ==
=== Books ===
- Aldrich, Robert; McCreery, Cindy, eds. (2020). Monarchies and decolonisation in Asia. Manchester University Press. ISBN 9781526142696.

=== Journals ===
- Seidel, Max (2007). "Burma, September 2007 Contemporary Art and Political Iconography". Mitteilungen des Kunsthistorischen Institutes in Florenz. 51 (4). Kunsthistorisches Institut in Florenz: 503–538. doi:10.32350/41310697. JSTOR 41310697.

== Bibliography ==
- "Sao Shwe Thaik's Brief Biography". Mawk Ngao Ngoon. 2013.
- "Sao Shwe Thaik". Sarpay Beikman Magazine. Vol. 1, no. 1. Sarpay Beikman. 1952. pp. 153–165.
- Donald M. Seekins (2006). Historical Dictionary of Burma (Myanmar). Rowman & Littlefield. pp. 410–411. ISBN 9780810854765.

Political offices
Preceded by Hubert Rance (Governor of Burma)	President of Burma; 1948–1952	Succeeded by Ba U
