= Kyaw Zaw =

Burmese political and military leader (1919–2012)

Brigadier General Thray Sithu Kyaw Zaw BC-3504
- ‌ကျော်ဇော
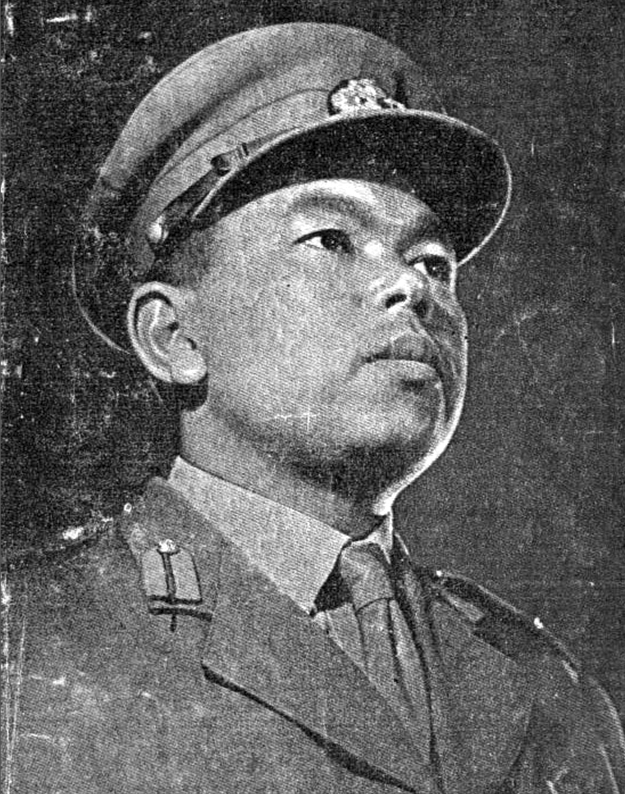
- Born: Shwe; 3 December 1919; Hsaisu, Thonze Tharrawaddy District, British Burma
- Died: 10 October 2012 (aged 92); Kunming, Yunnan, China
- Other name: Thakin Shwe
- Known for: Member of the Thirty Comrades
- Spouse: Than Sein
- Children: Hla Kyaw Zaw; San Kyaw Zaw; Aung Kyaw Zaw; Kyaw Zaw Oo (deceased); Tun Aye Kyaw Zaw (deceased)
- Awards: Independence Mawgunwin (First Class); Thray Sithu

Kyaw Zaw (Burmese: ‌ကျော်ဇော, [tɕɔ̀ zɔ́]; 3 December 1919 – 10 October 2012) was one of the founders of the Tatmadaw (the modern Burmese Army) and a member of the Thirty Comrades who trained in Japan in the struggle for independence from Britain. He was also one of the leaders of the Communist Party of Burma (CPB), and had lived in exile in Yunnan Province, China, since 1989 after retiring from politics.

== Student activist ==
Born Maung Shwe in a village called Hsaisu near Thonze in Tharrawaddy District, British Burma, Kyaw Zaw was educated in the traditional manner, mainly in monastic schools often becoming a novice monk during the Buddhist lent, until the final year when he went to the Pazundaung Municipal High School in Rangoon. There he met teachers who were members of the nationalist Dobama Asiayone (We Burmans Association) who made him become politically aware and soon joined the Yè tat (The Braves - Dobama militia). As he was educated only in the vernacular and had no knowledge of the English language required for university, he went on to the Highergrade Teachers Training School where English was not required.

The Great General Strike of 1938, known as Htaung thoun ya byei Ayeidawbon (the "Revolution of 1300" named after the Burmese calendar year), saw him as one of the student protesters successfully picketing the Secretariat, the seat of the colonial government, on 20 December. As the students left in triumphant procession, they were confronted by the British mounted police who charged into the students from Rangoon University at the head of the procession beating them with their batons and killing one of their number called Aung Kyaw. Kyaw Zaw saw this and was himself slightly injured trampled by a horse.

== Freedom fighter ==
When the strike came to an end, a disappointed Kyaw Zaw joined the Dobama Asiayone and became Thakin Shwe before he returned to Thonze to become a schoolteacher but still active in the political struggle for independence and involved in organising and training the local militia. Here he met his future wife Ma Than Sein, but he still had his mind set on learning English, and so at the beginning of 1941 Kyaw Zaw found himself back in Rangoon. He was however soon to be recruited by the Thakin leaders for military training as the struggle for national liberation gathered momentum, and in April 1941 Kyaw Zaw, aged 21, joined a group of young men who would go down in history as the Thirty Comrades and left Burma secretly smuggled aboard a ship bound for Yokohama, Japan. They were then flown to Hainan Island, China where they received military training before they returned to Burma as the Burma Independence Army (BIA) led by Aung San with the invading Japanese Army in December 1941. Thakin Shwe was now known by a nom de guerre Bo Kyaw Zaw (Commander Fame).

== Army career ==
After Burma gained independence in 1948, Kyaw Zaw became famous as the commander who fought and defeated the Kuomintang who had fled China after the Communist victory in 1949 and had established bases in Burmese territory in the early 1950s. The Kuomintang were supported by the United States and remained in Burma for a few years in the early 1950s making occasional forays into China to fight the Chinese communists. During the period of 1953 to 1955, under Brigadier General Kyaw Zaw's command the Burmese Army fought the Kuomintang and drove them out of Burmese territory into Thailand. Between 1954 and 1955, Brig.Gen. Kyaw Zaw also successfully led a campaign against the insurgent Karen National Union (KNU) and established central government control in the Karen State. The Prime Minister at the time was U Nu and the Commander in Chief of the Army General Ne Win. Kyaw Zaw was wounded by a shrapnel in his thigh in 1949 during the Battle of Insein when the Karen National Defence Organisation (KNDO) laid siege to the capital Rangoon. He was commissioned by Ne Win during the crisis as the commanding officer and Zaw rated this battle as the bitterest with the greatest loss of life in his military career.

Brig. Gen. Kyaw Zaw was forced to retire from the Army in April 1957 when papers recovered from raids of the Burmese Communist rebel strongholds located in central Burma indicated that Kyaw Zaw might have contacted and informed the Communists of the Army's movements. A Commission established to investigate "In Re the matter of Brig.Gen.Kyaw Zaw" (in Burmese Bohmu Gyoke Kyaw Zaw Keik-sa) found that a preponderance of the evidence showed that Brig.Gen. Zaw's role was suspect and recommended his discharge from the Army. He had joined the Communist Party in 1944 and was elected to the Central Committee the following year. He had however decided not to join the Army rebellion led by Communist commanders soon after independence in 1948; he was convalescing from tuberculosis.

== Civilian interlude ==
After his discharge from the Army, Kyaw Zaw contested as an independent candidate for Parliament in the multiparty general election of February 1960 but was unsuccessful. In April 1963 the Revolutionary Council (RC) led by General Ne Win invited the various armed rebel groups for negotiation in peace talks to be held in Rangoon. During "the peace parley" Kyaw Zaw became an active supporter of the People's Peace Committee along with another veteran leader, the venerated elder politician and writer Thakin Kodaw Hmaing (1876–1964). Many armed groups came to Rangoon, under the promise of a safe passage by the RC which it did honor, for the negotiations. The Communist Party of Burma (CPB), also known as the "White Flag" Communists, which went underground on 28 March 1948 and had since been active as a clandestine party led by Thakin Than Tun, sent a delegation though Than Tun himself remained in the jungle. The "Red Flag" Communists, a Trotskyist group that went underground in October 1946 even before independence from Britain was declared on 4 January 1948, and led by Thakin Soe, also joined the peace talks headed by the flamboyant Soe himself. The peace parley with the various armed groups, with the exception of the Karen National Defence Organisation (KNDO, the military wing of the KNU) with whom the RC did sign a cease-fire and an armistice agreement, broke down in June 1963, and the representatives of these rebel groups were allowed a safe passage back to their jungle strongholds.

Though Kyaw Zaw was not arrested after the breakdown of the peace talks, in June 1963 dozens of Burmese politicians and writers who were suspected of having "Communist sympathies" were arrested and jailed without any charge or trial by the RC for several years. Among the detainees in the immediate aftermath of the failed peace parley were Aung Than, older brother of Aung San and a leader of the above-ground political party National United Front (NUF), and the writer Dagon Taya (real name U Htay Myaing, b. 9 May 1919).

== Communist leader ==
In late July 1976, the Socialist Burmese government announced in newspapers and on state radio that Kyaw Zaw's, son Aung Kyaw Zaw and daughter Dr. Hla Kyaw Zaw had disappeared from their homes and requested the public's assistance in finding them. Within several days on 10 August 1976 the clandestine Communist Party of Burma (CPB) radio station based at that time in Kunming, China, announced that "former Brigadier Kyaw Zaw has arrived in the liberated area" i.e. the areas under the control of the CPB. The same day Kyaw Zaw broadcast an appeal on CPB radio to the people and especially requested the Burmese Army personnel to join the CPB and "the mainstream of the People's Democratic Forces". Among others, in his appeal to the Burmese Army personnel, Kyaw Zaw stated that he was one of the founding members of the Burmese Army. He rhetorically asked the troops what would have happened to the Army and the country if he had, like Ne Win, then President and long-time dictator of Burma, "acted and cavorted like a feudal play-boy prince". He also revealed for the first time that Aung San and others among the Thirty Comrades had once seriously considered removing Ne Win from the military as he had shown "fascist" tendencies under the Japanese. Kyaw Zaw stated that the plan of Aung San and other leaders to remove Ne Win from the military was unsuccessful due to Ne Win's "cunning" (kauk-kyit hmu), pleasing both sides (hna-phet myet hnar loke-hmu) and the conditions pertaining at that time i.e. during the war and immediate post-war years. Kyaw Zaw claimed that the unsuccessful and ostensible attempts to remove Ne Win from commanding the Burmese military was a "historical lesson". He exhorted the government troops not to continue as assassins and murderers in the service of the "power-mad and evil king ( min-hsoe min-nyit) Ne Win". Kyaw Zaw stated that the "most important aspects of the Army's history such as the Resistance against the Japanese March to May 1945 and the immediate post-war years were co-terminous with my personal life". Giving the examples of China and "what had happened only very recently in Indochina (i.e the Communist victories in Kampuchea, Vietnam and Laos in April and December 1975)" he requested the Army personnel not to be hesitant to "join the armed revolution led by the Communist Party of Burma".

Very few, if any, Burmese military personnel of any import heeded the call of Kyaw Zaw to join forces with the CPB. Instead, mainly due to internal rebellions by the Wa and Kokang ethnic groups which constituted the CPB's "People's Army", the CPB virtually collapsed in 1989. Even though the CPB now had a web site (CPB)and occasionally issues announcements regarding the political situation in Burma, it is now a pale shadow of its former self when it used to have, under its command, an Army or armed resistance groups in the thousands if not in the tens of thousands.

In May 1980 Ne Win's Burma Socialist Programme Party (BSPP) government announced an Amnesty, and even though many exiled opponents of Ne Win's regime such as former Prime Minister U Nu and Bo Yan Naing, another famous member of the Thirty Comrades, returned to Burma under the Amnesty, Kyaw Zaw did not. In a speech given to the Burma War Veterans Association on 29 July 1982 Ne Win briefly "reminisced" about the Thirty Comrades days and made a brief reference to "Bo Kyaw Zaw- the one that left or ran away". ( A translation of Ne Win's speech can be read in the 30 July 1982 issues of the Rangoon Guardian and the Working People's Daily)

During the 8888 Uprising in 1988 the Military Intelligence (MI) claimed that both Kyaw Zaw and Thakin Ba Thein Tin had written to Daw Khin Kyi, the mother of Aung San Suu Kyi, and after her death, Aung San Suu Kyi was encouraged to enter politics by Communist sympathisers including Kyaw Zaw's other daughter San Kyaw Zaw. Implicit in the emphasis on this "guilt by association" is to establish the "Communist lineage" from the fact that Aung San Suu Kyi is the niece of Thakin Than Tun, the late CPB Chairman (1945–1967). Kyaw Zaw's son-in-law Thet Khaing was also accused of being a leader of the Communist Underground (UG) responsible for organising the General Strike Committees in both Rangoon and Mandalay and infiltrating the student unions.

== Unfinished business ==
Kyaw Zaw, after nearly ten years in exile in 1998, now aged 78, called for a meaningful political dialogue between the ruling junta — the State Peace and Development Council (SPDC) — and Burmese opposition groups, including the National League for Democracy (NLD) led by Aung San Suu Kyi. He believed the Burmese people's struggle for a government they deserved had not finished yet and that they would have to "struggle for themselves courageously, ceaselessly and collectively". The military regime's move to Pyinmana as the capital of the country, he commented, indicated not so much the fear of invasion by the United States as the fear of another popular uprising in future.

Kyaw Zaw was then only one of two surviving Thirty Comrades. The Thirty Comrades were a group of Burmese men who secretly left Burma in 1941, and were trained by the Japanese on Hainan Island and returned to Burma with the invading Japanese Army in early to mid-1942. In a house in Bangkok on 26 December 1941, most of the Thirty Comrades had their blood drawn (in syringes) and poured into a silver bowl from which each of them drank (thway thauk in time-honoured tradition) and pledged "eternal loyalty" to each other and to the cause of Burmese independence. Among the Thirty Comrades were Thakin Aung San who took the nom de guerre Bo Tayza, Thakin Shu Maung who became Bo Ne Win and Thakin Shwe who became Bo Kyaw Zaw. Kyaw Zaw was one of the youngest of the Thirty Comrades. The sole surviving member of the Thirty Comrades today is Bo Yè Htut who is believed to be living in Pyinmana. Bo Ye Htut, like Bo Zeya (killed in action in 1968) and Bo Yan Aung (killed in the CPB purge of 1967), was one of the Communist members of the Thirty Comrades who led the Army rebellion in 1948 when Bo Kyaw Zaw decided to remain in the Army. Kyaw Zaw had also stated that he always believed the British were behind the assassination of Aung San one way or another.

The memoirs of Kyaw Zaw written in Burmese can be accessed at the CPB web site. It was published outside Burma in 2007 titled "From Hsaisu to Menghai". He was regarded by some as one of only three military leaders in Burma's history that enjoyed the status of teacher in the heart of ordinary soldiers; the other two were Aung San and Tin Oo.

== Death ==
Kyaw Zaw died on 10 October 2012 at a hospital in Kunming, the capital of Yunnan, China. He was 92, and survived by his two daughters, one son and seven grandchildren. His last dying wish was to pay a final visit to the Shwedagon pagoda in Yangon.
