= 1947 Burmese general election =

- 9 April 1947

210 seats in the Constituent Assembly 106 seats needed for a majority
- Turnout: 49.8%
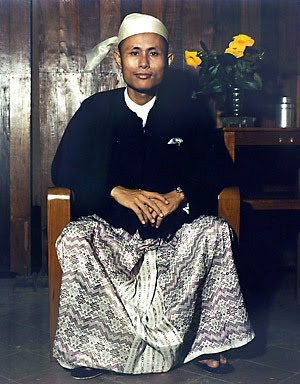

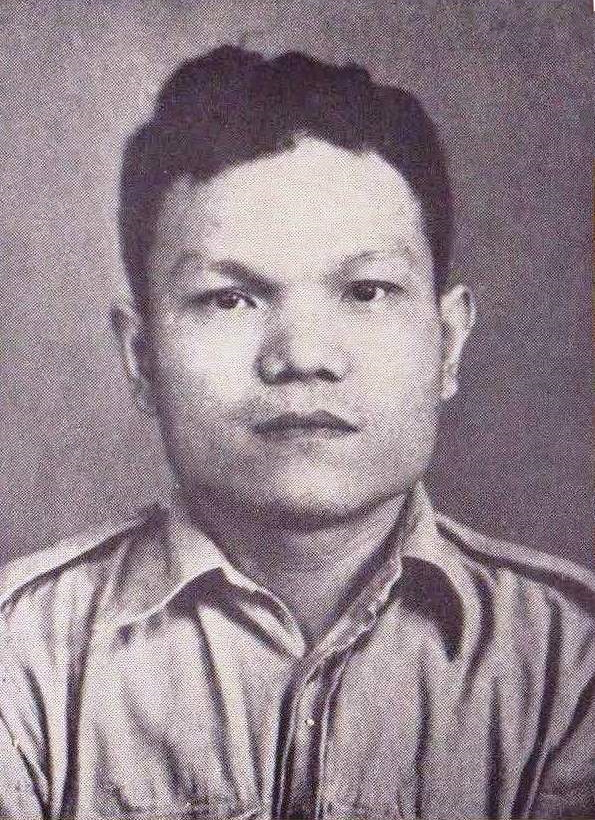

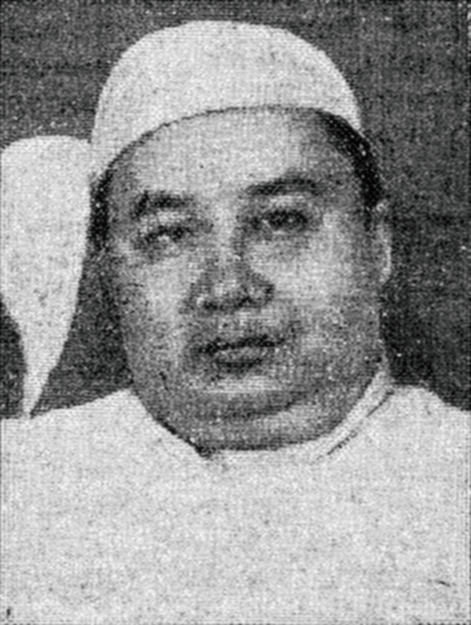
	First party	Second party	Third party
Leader	Aung San	Thakin Than Tun	Win Maung
Party	AFPFL	CPB	KYO
Seats won	173	7	19
Popular vote	1,755,000	126,000	109,000
Premier before election
Aung San
AFPFL
Prime Minister-elect
U Nu
AFPFL

General elections were held in Burma on 9 April 1947 to form the basis of a constituent assembly that would design a constitution once independence from the United Kingdom had been achieved. They were the first elections in Burma since its separation from India under the British Raj. Voter turnout was 49.8%. However, Aung San was assassinated three months later, resulting in U Nu becoming the first Prime Minister of Burma.

== Background ==
The elections were among a number of provisions agreed on 27 January 1947 between Burmese nationalist Aung San on a visit to London and British Prime Minister Clement Attlee guaranteeing Burma's independence from the UK within a year.

== Campaign ==
In 56 non-communal constituencies, candidates from the Anti-Fascist People's Freedom League (AFPFL) ran unopposed. U Saw, leader of the Patriot's Party, accused the AFPFL of intimidation and corruption during the election campaign and boycotted the election, as did Ba Hein and his party, accusing the AFPFL of being a "stooges" of British imperialism. Reasons given for the low turnout included the instability left by the Japanese occupation of Burma and the struggle for independence. Other candidates in the election included a few independents and communists. The election was certified as free and fair. On the other hand, the nationalists Ba Maw and U Saw and the radical marxist Thakin Ba Hein formed an alliance to boycott the elections.

== Results ==
Turnout was generally low, around 50% in contested constituencies.

Party	Votes	%	Seats
Anti-Fascist People's Freedom League	1,755,000		173
Communist Party of Burma	126,000		7
Karen Youth Organisation	109,000		19
Independent Karen			5
Anglo-Burmese			4
Independents			2
Total			210
Registered voters/turnout		49.8	
Source: Nohlen et al.

== Aftermath ==
On 19 July 1947 Aung San was assassinated along with six other members of the party, after which the leadership of the AFPFL was taken over by U Nu. Several major radical opposition figures such as Ba Maw, Thakin Ba Hein, Bo Yan Naing and others were arrested for their ties to Aung's assassin. Although most of them were released after a short time as no evidence was found of their involvement, U Saw was hanged. A constitution was approved on 24 September 1947 and independence granted on 4 January 1948.

== See also ==
- British rule in Burma
- Panglong Conference
