= All Burma Trade Union Congress =

The All Burma Trade Union Congress was a central trade union organisation in Burma. ABTUC was founded on January 30, 1940. ABTUC had its origins in the All Burma Labour Conference, which had been assembled by the Thakins in July 1939. In August 1940 ABTUC publicly stated the goals of the organisation; racial and gender equality, social welfare, minimum wage, standardisation of working hours, better working conditions and establishing a socialist state with socialisation of production, distribution and exchange. Ba Swe was the main figure behind the ABTUC in its early stage.

ABTUC suspended its activities when Japan occupied Burma.

ABTUC was re-constituted on June 1, 1945, with Thakin Ba Hein (a prominent leader of the Communist Party of Burma) as its president. At this point, ABTUC counted with fourteen affiliated trade unions with a combined membership of 11,500. On July 9, 1945, ABTUC requested affiliation to the World Federation of Trade Unions. After the death of Thakin Ba Hein in 1946, the leadership of ABTUC was taken over by H. N. Goshal.

In November 1945 socialists set up the Trade Union Congress (Burma) to counter the influence of the ABTUC.

In July and September 1946 the ABTUC, under the leadership of Thakin Than Tun, organised a series of strikes against the "repressive measures" of the AFPFL government. In September, ABTUC organised a general strike. Employees in all government department took part in the general strike. Apart for calling for democratic rights, the general strike also expressed anti-imperialist positions and calls for solidarity with the struggles of the peasantry.

In March 1948, ABTUC mobilised a general strike amongst the workers of British-owned industries, refineries, workshops, dockyards, etc. Military forces were mobilised to crush the strike. Striking workers were attacked, and over 100 persons were injured. Soon after this incident, the Communist Party of Burma initiated its campaign of armed struggle. In the wake of the crack-down on the Communist Party of Burma, ABTUC was banned.
