= Anti-Fascist Organisation =

WWII-era Burmese resistance movement

- Abbreviation: AFO
- Leader: Thakin Soe
- Founded: August 1944
- Dissolved: 1–3 March 1945
- Merger of: CPB; BNA; PRP
- Succeeded by: AFPFL
- Ideology: Anti-fascism; Burmese nationalism Factions: Communism; Socialism
- Political position: Left-wing

The Anti-Fascist Organisation (AFO) was a resistance movement against the Japanese occupation of Burma and independence of Burma during World War II. It was the forerunner of the Anti-Fascist People's Freedom League.

== History ==
The AFO was formed at a meeting in Pegu in August 1944 held by the leaders of the Communist Party of Burma (CPB), the Burma National Army (BNA) led by General Aung San, and the People's Revolutionary Party (PRP), later renamed the Burma Socialist Party.

Whilst in Insein prison in July 1941, CPB leaders Thakin Than Tun and Thakin Soe had co-authored the Insein Manifesto, which, against the prevailing opinion in the Burmese nationalist movement led by the Dobama Asiayone, identified world fascism as the main enemy in the coming war and called for temporary cooperation with the British in a broad allied coalition that included the Soviet Union. Soe had already gone underground to organise resistance against the Japanese occupation, and Than Tun as Minister of Land and Agriculture was able to pass on Japanese intelligence to Soe, while other Communist leaders Thakin Thein Pe and Thakin Tin Shwe made contact with the exiled colonial government in Simla, India. Aung San was War Minister in the puppet administration set up on 1 August 1943 which also included the Socialist leaders Thakin Nu and Thakin Mya.

At a meeting held between 1 and 3 March 1945, the AFO was reorganised as a multi-party front named the Anti-Fascist People's Freedom League.
