= Wa Gyi =

Burmese communist leader

Wa Gyi was a Burmese communist leader.

In 1956 he joined the Burmese Communist Party (Red Flag) and went underground. In 1959 he became leader in a Party District Committee. In 1967 he was promoted to Central Committee member.

Wa Gyi surrendered on December 9, 1970, after having lost his entire family (wife, sister, 4 children) in the struggle. In 1973 he was a witness during the trial of Red Flag leader Thakin Soe.
