= Kommyunit Nezin =

Kommyunit Nezin (Burmese: ကွန်မြူနစ်နေ့စဉ်, pronounced [kʊ̀ɰ̃mjùnɪʔ nḛ zɪ̀ɰ̃], literally "Communist Daily") was a daily newspaper in Burma, published by the Communist Party of Burma from Rangoon in the latter half of the 1940s.
