= Thakin Ba Thein Tin =

Burmese communist (1914–1995)

- ဗသိန်းတင်

Chairman of Communist Party of Burma
- In office 1975–1989
- Preceded by: Thakin Zin
- Succeeded by: Yebaw Kyin Maung (secretary)

Personal details
- Born: 1914 Tavoy, British Burma
- Died: 1995 (aged 80–81) Changsha, China
- Party: Communist Party of Burma
- Education: Rangoon University
- Occupation: politician

Thakin Ba Thein Tin (Burmese: သခင်ဗသိန်းတင်, 1914–1995) was a Burmese communist and the chairman of Communist Party of Burma (CPB) from 1975 to 1989.

Born in Tavoy, his father was a Chinese petty trader, his mother was a Burmese. In 1931, he passed the matriculation exam and attended Rangoon University. However, he was unable to further his studies because his debt-ridden father could not afford university fees.

Ba Thein Tin became a worker for the Dohbama Asiayone in 1938, and joined the CPB in the next year, he was one of the earliest CPB members. As the district party committee organizer in Tavoy, he fought against Japanese in 1945. He became a politburo member of CPB in the next year. In March 1948, he went underground with Thakin Than Tun. He was selected the vice chairman in 1950. In 1953, he left for China and resided there. Since mid-1960s he became the de facto leader of CPB. After the assassination of Thakin Zin, Ba Thein Tin was selected the chairman in May 1975, and continued fighting against Burma government. However, he did not return from China until 1978.

In April 1989, a group of CPB mutineers raided the party headquarters in the border town of Panghsang. Ba Thein Tin and many senior party members were deported to China. He died in Changsha, Hunan, in 1995.

Party political offices
Preceded by Thakin Zin	chairman of Communist Party of Burma; 1975–1989	Succeeded by Yebaw Kyin Maung as secretary
