= Communist Party of Burma =

Underground political party in Myanmar

Communist Party of Burma ဗမာပြည်ကွန်မြူနစ်ပါတီ
- Abbreviation: CPB
- General Secretary: Htun Set
- Spokesperson: Po Than Gyaung
- Founders: Aung San; Thakin Ba Hein; Thakin Bo; Thakin Hla Pe; Thakin Soe; Yèbaw Ba Tin; Yèbaw Tun Maung
- Founded: 15 August 1939
- Banned: October 1953
- Headquarters: Panghsang (until 1989)
- Newspaper: People's Power
- Youth wing: Red Guards
- Armed wing: People's Liberation Army
- Ideology: Communism; Marxism–Leninism; Maoism; Federalism
- Political position: Far-left
- National affiliation: AFPFL (1945–1946)

Website
- www.cp-burma.org

The Communist Party of Burma (CPB), (Note: Burmese: ဗမာပြည်ကွန်မြူနစ်ပါတီ) also known as the Burma Communist Party (BCP), (Note: "Burma Communist Party" was the English name commonly used by the Burmese government and local English language press before 1989.) is an underground communist party in Myanmar (formerly Burma). The party adheres to Marxism–Leninism and Maoism (officially Mao Zedong Thought). Founded in 1939, it is the oldest existing political party in the country.

The CPB initially fought against British colonial forces in Myanmar before joining them in a temporary alliance to expel the invading Imperial Japanese Army during World War II. In the final years of the war, the CPB helped establish a leftist political and military coalition called the Anti-Fascist People's Freedom League (AFPFL). However, the CPB fell out of favour with the more moderate socialists within the AFPFL due to differing views on how an independent Myanmar should be governed. After independence in 1948, the moderate faction became the dominant political force in the AFPFL-led government and began cracking down on the CPB. The CPB's leaders were forced out of the capital Rangoon (present-day Yangon) and into the countryside, and the party consequently began an armed insurrection in Paukkongyi, Pegu Region (present-day Bago Region). The four-decade-long insurgency by the CPB ended with an internal mutiny and the party's leadership fleeing to China.

Following the 2021 Myanmar coup d'état, the CPB's cadres rearmed themselves and reentered Myanmar. The CPB announced it had begun a "people's war" against the State Administration Council, the military junta established after the coup. The CPB maintains cordial relations with the National Unity Government and the People's Defence Force.

== History ==
=== Founding ===
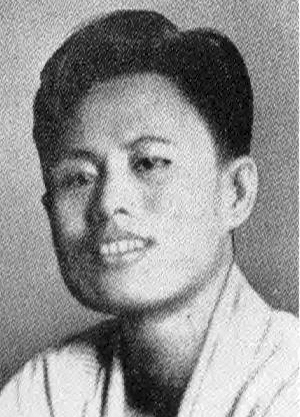
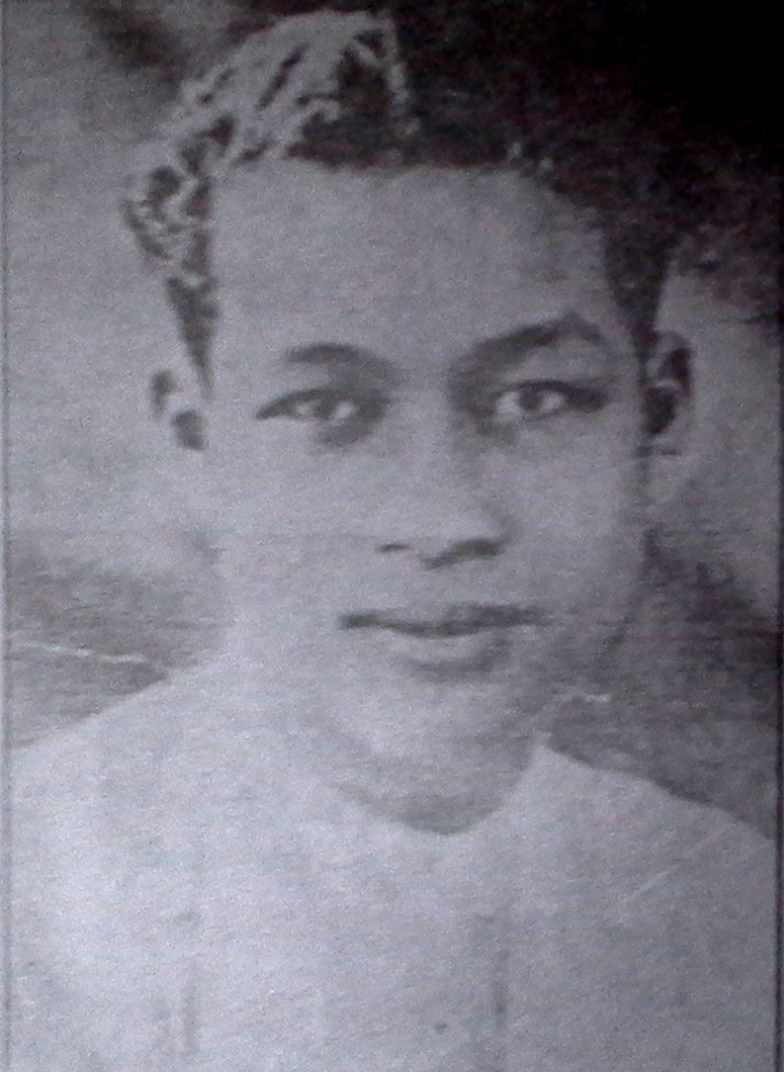
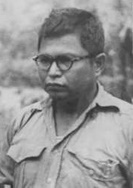
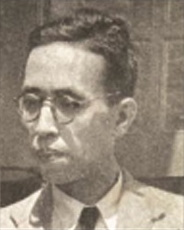
Four of the seven founders of the CPB. Clockwise from the top left: Thakin Aung San, Thakin Ba Hein, Thakin Hla Pe, and Thakin Soe.

First flag of the CPB (1939–1946)

The CPB was established in a secret meeting attended by seven men in a small room in Barr Street, Rangoon, on 15 August 1939. The attendees were Thakin Aung San, Thakin Ba Hein, Thakin Bo, Thakin Hla Pe (Bo Let Ya), Thakin Soe, Yèbaw Ba Tin (H. N. Goshal), and Yèbaw Tun Maung (Amar Nag). (Note: Thakin means "master" in Burmese, while Yèbaw means "comrade". Members of the nationalist We Burmans Association (Dobama Asiayone) were the first to put Thakin in front of their names, to symbolise that they were the "true masters" of Burma, not the British.) An armed wing was formed shortly afterwards which fought against British colonial rule and then the invading Imperial Japanese Army upon the start of the Burma campaign of World War II.

=== World War II (1941–1945) ===
While in Insein Prison in July 1941, Thakin Soe and Thakin Than Tun coauthored the Insein Manifesto, which declared fascism "the major enemy in the coming war" and called for temporary cooperation with the British and the establishment of a broad alliance that would include the Soviet Union. It followed the popular front line advocated by Bulgarian communist leader Georgi Dimitrov at the seventh congress of the Comintern in 1935.

This was against the prevailing opinion of the nationalist We Burmans Association (Dobama Asiayone or the "Thakins"), including Aung San, who had secretly left Burma in 1940 with a group of young intellectuals, later known as the Thirty Comrades, to receive military training from the Japanese. Aung San and the Thirty Comrades returned to Burma in 1941 and established the Burma Independence Army (BIA) to fight against the Allies. After capturing Rangoon in 1942, the Japanese established a puppet state, the State of Burma, and later installed Aung San as its Deputy Prime Minister in August 1943. The BIA was reorganised as the puppet state's armed forces, the Burma National Army (BNA).

Thakin Soe had gone underground in the Irrawaddy Delta to organise armed resistance soon after the invasion, and Thakin Than Tun, as Minister of Land and Agriculture, was able to pass on intelligence to Thakin Soe. Thakin Thein Pe and Tin Shwe made contact in July 1942 with the exiled colonial government in Simla, India. In January 1944, at a secret meeting near Dedaye in the Delta, the CPB successfully held its first congress, chaired by Thakin Soe.

Aung San became increasingly sceptical of Japan's ability to win the war as time progressed, and in mid-1944, he decided to switch sides, reaching out to his former comrades in the CPB. The CPB, together with the BNA and the People's Revolutionary Party (PSP), formed the Anti-Fascist Organisation (AFO) at a secret meeting in Pegu in August 1944. The AFO was later renamed the Anti-Fascist People's Freedom League (AFPFL) on 3 March 1945. Five days later, on 8 March 1945, the communist commander Ba Htoo of the northwest command based in Mandalay started a rebellion against the Japanese. The rebellion escalated into a national uprising on 27 March 1945, led by the BNA under the command of Aung San. Japanese forces capitulated by July 1945, and the AFPFL became Burma's most influential political party in the post-war years leading up to independence and for several years after independence was achieved.

During the war years, the CPB served as the most effective part of the AFPFL, being behind many of the key political and organisational decisions taken by the organisation, such as organising British support and training for resistance fighters, and holding a pivotal role in the anti-Japanese uprising. Soviet scholars estimated that units under CPB control were behind 50% of Japanese casualties in Burma inflicted by the AFPFL and ended the war with 40,000 guerrillas to their name.

=== Post-World War II developments (1945–1948) ===
Thakin Soe and Ba Tin travelled to India in September 1945 to talk to the Communist Party of India, and Thakin Soe came back convinced that armed struggle was the only way forward. Amidst widespread strikes starting with the Rangoon Police and mass rallies, the new British governor Hubert Rance offered Aung San and the others seats in the Executive Council. Aung San initially refused the offer but eventually accepted it in September 1946.

Second flag of the CPB (1946–1969)

In February 1946, Thakin Soe denounced the CPB's leadership, particularly Thakin Thein Pe, accusing them of "Browderism" (after Earl Browder, the former leader of the Communist Party of the United States). Browder argued that armed revolution would no longer be necessary to establish a dictatorship of the proletariat, as world fascism and imperialism had been weakened, making constitutional methods a real option to achieve "national liberation". Thakin Thein Pe, who had replaced Thakin Soe as secretary general, was the leader responsible for the policy paper on strategy entitled Toward Better Mutual Understanding and Greater Cooperation written in India and adopted at the party's second congress at Bagaya Road, Rangoon in July 1945. Thakin Soe broke away from the CPB to form a splinter group called the Communist Party (Burma) or CP(B) for short. The CP(B) was popularly nicknamed the "red flag communists" as they continued to use the CPB's original red-coloured flag. The majority remained with Thakin Than Tun and Thakin Thein Pe and continued to cooperate with the AFPFL; they were nicknamed the "Thein-Than communists" by the Rangoon press and were popularly known as the "white flag communists" for their use of new white-coloured party flags. During negotiations, the British noticed that Thakin Than Tun was the thinker behind Aung San, as Aung San often referred to his brother-in-law for his opinion.

The CPB had abandoned its Browderist line by mid-1946, and a rift that had opened up between the party and Aung San with the socialists culminated in Thakin Than Tun being forced to resign as general secretary of the AFPFL in July, a position he had held since the AFPFL's inception. The CPB was finally expelled from the AFPFL on 2 November 1946 after the communists accused Aung San and the socialists of "kneeling before imperialism", selling out by joining the Executive Council, and calling off the general strike. In the end, the CPB failed to achieve "leftist unity" with Aung San and the socialists led by U Nu and Kyaw Nyein within the AFPFL.

In February 1947, Ba Thein Tin and communist student leader Aung Gyi attended the British Empire Conference of Communist Parties in London, the first time the CPB took part in an international communist forum. After denouncing the elections to the Constituent Assembly that took place the following April, the party fielded 25 junior candidates but won just 7 seats. The assassination of Aung San and his cabinet members on 19 July stunned the CPB as much as the rest of the country, but the party was still anxious to build a united front with the AFPFL to drive the British out of Burma, convinced that the assassination was an imperialist plot to stop Aung San from achieving leftist unity.

U Nu concluded negotiations that Aung San had started with the British premier Clement Attlee in London, and the Nu-Attlee Treaty of October 1947 was condemned as a sham by the communists, the bone of contention in particular being the Let Ya-Freeman Defence Agreement, appended as an annex to the treaty. It provided for an initial period of three years for a British military training mission to remain in the country and a possible future military alliance with Britain. This was to the CPB proof of British intention to subvert Burma's sovereignty and U Nu's capitulation.

U Nu called for a new coalition between communists and socialists on 8 November 1947, urging negotiations between the CPB, the PSP, and the People's Volunteer Organisation (PVO), an association of World War II veterans which served as Aung San's private army. When the attempted coalition failed, U Nu accused the communists of gathering arms for an insurrection. The impact of communist campaigning against the treaty left its mark in Burma's decision not to join the British Commonwealth. Yèbaw Ba Tin, the CPB's Burma-born Bengali theoretician, released a thesis in December 1947 titled, On the Present Political Situation and Our Tasks which set out a revolutionary strategy reviving the slogan "final seizure of power" from the previous January, and called for a "national rising to tear up the treaty of slavery", nationalisation of all British and foreign assets, the abolition of all forms of landlordism and debt, the dismantling of the state bureaucracy and its replacement with a people's government, and alliances and trade agreements with "democratic China, fighting Vietnam and Indonesia" and other democratic countries resisting "Anglo-American imperialist domination". A twofold strategy would be followed: an escalating campaign of strikes by workers and government employees in Rangoon and other cities, and the establishment of "liberated" areas in the countryside to be defended by Red Guards consisting of PVOs trained in guerrilla warfare.

February 1948 saw a wave of strikes in Rangoon by the All Burma Trade Union Congress (ABTUC) backed by the CPB, and in March 1948 a 75,000-strong mass rally by the All Burma Peasants Organisation (ABPO) took place in Pyinmana. U Nu ordered the arrest of the CPB's leaders, convinced that they were planning an uprising on Resistance Day, 27 March, only to find the CPB headquarters at Bagaya empty on the morning of. The party leadership had flown to their stronghold in Pyinmana to start an armed revolution.

=== Insurgency against the AFPFL (1948–1962) ===
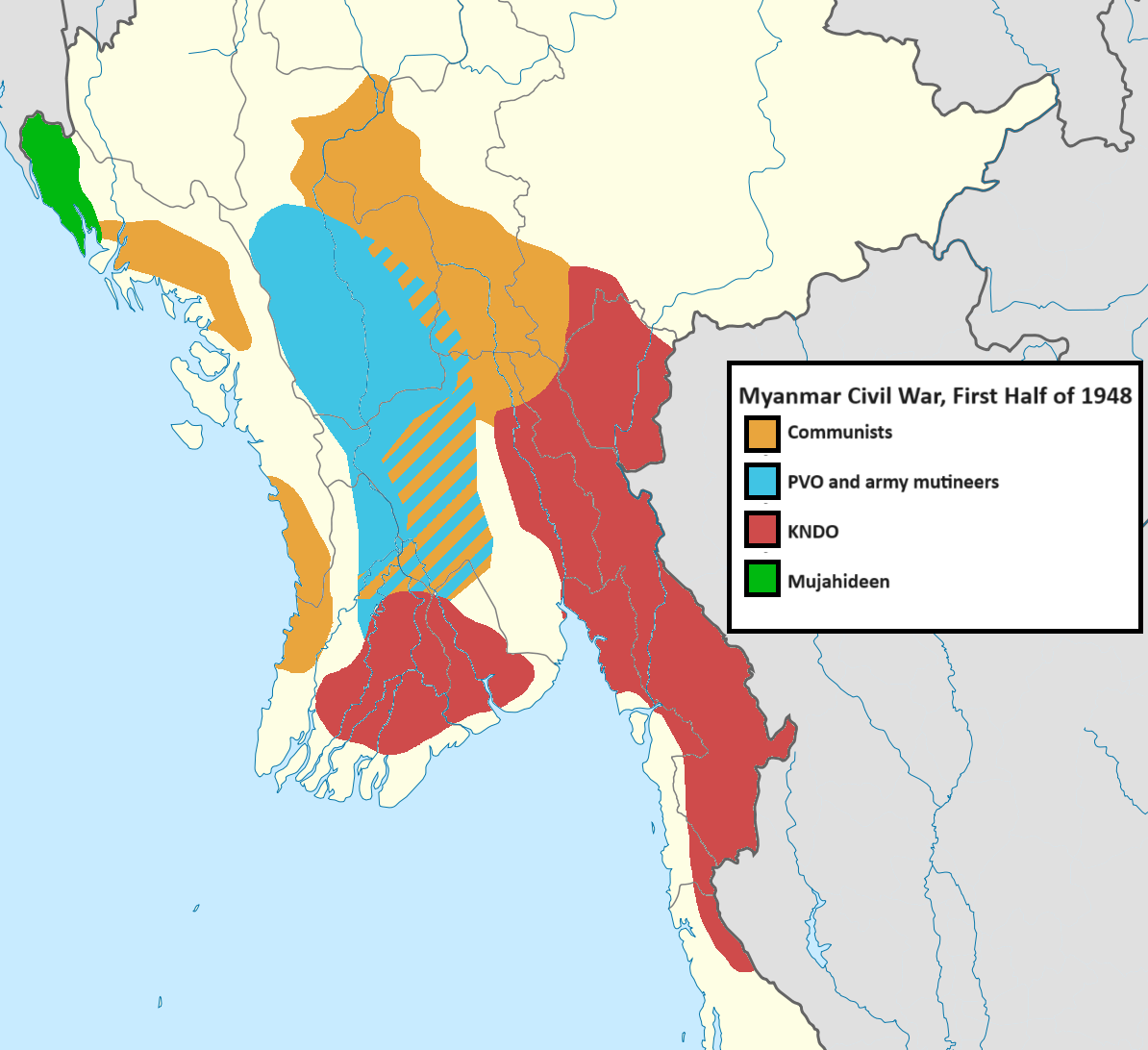
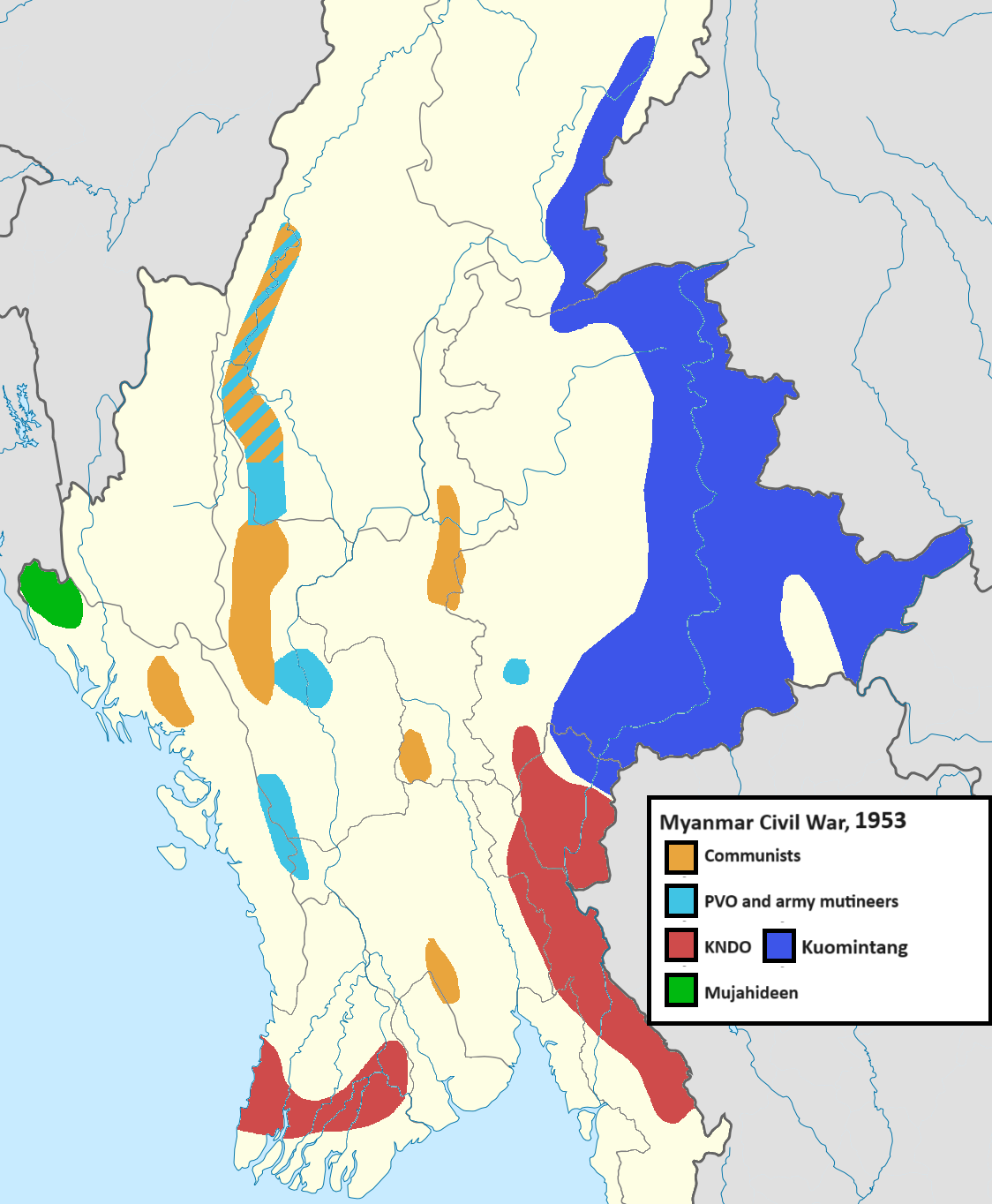
Map of insurgent activity in Burma in 1948 (top) and 1953 (bottom)

The CPB fired the first shots of their post-independence insurgency in Paukkongyi, Pegu Region, on 2 April 1948. Thakin Soe's red flag communists had already started a rebellion, as had the Arakanese nationalists led by the veteran monk U Seinda and the Muslim mujahideen in Arakan. The PVO had split into "white-band" and "yellow-band" factions; the majority white-band PVO, led by Bo La Yaung (a member of the Thirty Comrades) and Bo Po Kun, joined the insurrection in July 1948. U Nu's government deployed the Karen and Kachin Rifles to suppress the communist uprising, and took Pyay, Thayetmyo, and Pyinmana during the latter half of 1948. The Karen National Union (KNU) rebelled at the end of January 1949 when Army Chief of Staff Smith Dun, an ethnic Karen, was replaced by Ne Win, a socialist commander and senior member of the Thirty Comrades after Aung San and Bo Let Ya. The Mon joined the Karen shortly afterwards, as did the Pa-O in Shan State. Three regiments of the Burma Rifles also went underground and formed the Revolutionary Burma Army (RBA), led by communist commanders Bo Zeya, Bo Yan Aung, and Bo Ye Htut, all members of the Thirty Comrades. The CPB had 4,000 to 15,000 armed troops and 25,000 party members in 1949.

The CPB's appraisal of Burma as a "semi-colonial and semi-feudal" state led to the Maoist line of establishing guerrilla bases among the peasants in the countryside as opposed to mobilising the urban proletariat, although it continued to support above-ground leftist opposition parties such as the Burma Workers and Peasants Party (BWPP) led by trade union leaders Thakins Lwin and Chit Maung, and dubbed "crypto-communists" or "red socialists" by the Rangoon press. They tried unsuccessfully to bring the communists back into mainstream politics, and in 1956 formed an alliance called the National United Front to contest the election on a "peace ticket" winning 35 per cent of the vote though only a small number of seats.

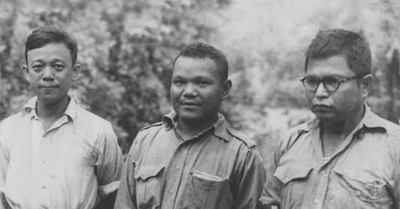
From left to right: Bo Htun Lwin, Commander of the People's Liberation Army; Thakin Than Tun, Chairman of the Communist Party of Burma; and Thakin Soe, General Secretary of the Communist Party (Burma)

The politburo's decision to fight "for the very existence of our party" at a clandestine central committee meeting in April 1948 in Rangoon was confirmed the following month by the full plenum of the central committee at Hpyu 120 miles north of the capital. The headquarters of the CPB remained on the move mostly in the forests and hills along the Sittang River valley, Pyinmana – Yamethin area in central Burma, sometimes north into the "Three M triangle" (Mandalay–Meiktila–Myingyan). Debt was abolished, and farming and trading cooperatives established in areas under their control.

One year into the insurrection, the CPB's forces were reorganised along Maoist lines and divided into a main force, mobile guerrilla forces, and local people's militias, with the command of each being shared between military and political commissars. The main force was called the People's Liberation Army (PLA), homonymous with the People's Liberation Army of the People's Republic of China founded around the same time. In September 1950, the PLA merged with the RBA regiments under Bo Zeya's command and formed the People's Army. Its regular forces consisted of four main divisions, each with a thousand armed troops.

Although its chairman, Thakin Than Tun, expressed support for the Karen people's right to self-determination, the CPB regarded the Karen National Union (KNU) as reactionaries employed by the British to destabilise Burma. The civil war was thus waged from three sides: the AFPFL, the communist PVOs, and the ethnic minority nationalists, with the KNU threatening Rangoon itself in early 1949. U Nu estimated government casualties alone at 3,424 dead, including 1,352 army personnel from 1950 to 1952. He also estimated that 22,000 civilians had been killed in the violence during the same period, but Western analysts argued it was an intentional underestimation and gave a much larger figure of 60,000 dead and 2 million displaced.

==== United fronts ====
The first united front against the AFPFL, the People's Democratic Front (PDF), was established in Pyay in March 1949, after the town was captured by a joint CPB, RBA, and PVO force. The Tripartite Alliance Pact was the next, signed by Thakin Than Tun, Thakin Soe, and Bo Po Kun at the village of Alaungdaw Kathapa near Monywa on 1 October 1952. Apart from the CPB-RBA merger of September 1950, which formed the People's Army, the agreements mainly involved the demarcation of territory and terms of cooperation.

In November 1952, a ceasefire agreement was reached between the CPB and the KNU, but a military alliance did not materialise until May 1959 in the form of the National Democratic United Front (NDUF). The surrender of smaller ethnic insurgent groups hastened the creation of the Democratic Nationalities United Front (DNUF), established in April 1956 by the KNU, which by then had become dominated by the Maoist Karen National United Party (KNUP) led by Mahn Ba Zan. The leftist turn of the KNU left it isolated from other ethnic insurgent groups, and it moved closer to the CPB despite the many staunch anti-communists in the veteran Christian leadership.

The NDUF also included the fledgling New Mon State Party (NMSP) led by Nai Shwe Kyin and formed after the surrender of the Mon People's Front (MPF), the Chin National Vanguard Party (CNVP) formed in March 1956, and the Karenni National Progressive Party (KNPP) led by Saw Maw Reh and formed in July 1957. Both the NMSP and the KNPP were founded with the help of the KNU. It was the most successful united front among the ethnic insurgent groups and lasted until 1976, when the KNU broke away from the NDUF to form the National Democratic Front (NDF).

However, political differences remained unresolved as no compromise was possible between the CPB's position of regional autonomy for Burma's ethnic minorities within a unitary state (modelled after the autonomous regions of China) and the ethnic minorities' demands for self-determination. Thakin Soe's red flag communists, meanwhile, advocated the establishment of "independent people's republics" for each ethnic group within a federal union (modelled after the Soviet Union) and, more importantly, the right of each ethnic group to secede from such a union. During the 1950s and 1960s, Thakin Soe and his red flag communists succeeded in creating amicable relations with various ethnic minority communities in the border regions of Burma, leading to the establishment of such groups as the Communist Party of Arakan and the Karen New Land Party. However, the red flags' numbers were relatively low in comparison to the CPB's, and by the early 1970s, most of the red flags' cadres had been crushed by other ethnic insurgent groups such as the KNU.

==== "Peace and unity" vs. "arms for democracy" ====
The communist military offensive began to lose traction in the early 1950s; Burmese authorities outlawed the party in October 1953, and the CPB put forward the "peace and unity" proposal in 1955. The CPB combined a strong peace movement consisting of its above-ground supporters and sympathizers with proposals by Thakin Than Tun to the AFPFL government in 1956. War-weariness had led to a desire for peace, and the move was welcomed by both the leftist opposition and conservative groups in Rangoon. Thakin Kodaw Hmaing, the revered veteran nationalist leader, formed an internal peace committee, which in 1958 was allowed by the government to speak on the CPB's behalf. The results of the 1956 election, where the National United Front did very well on a peace ticket, had also given the AFPFL a jolt.

On the international front, U.S. support of the Kuomintang (KMT) forces, which had crossed over from Yunnan province into northeastern Burma after Mao's victory in China, had resulted in Burma's refusal to join the Southeast Asia Treaty Organisation (SEATO). Zhou Enlai visited Rangoon on his return from the Geneva Conference on Indochina to meet U Nu, and issued a joint communique reaffirming the "five principles of peaceful coexistence" and the right of people "to choose their own state system"; U Nu repaid the visit the same year receiving the assurance that Chinese leaders had no contact with the CPB. Ne Win also led a military delegation to Beijing in 1957 and met Chairman Mao Zedong. A week-long visit in December 1955 by Nikolai Bulganin and Nikita Khrushchev appeared to endorse Burma as a model non-aligned, socialist Third World country developing at its own pace; Burma was a strong supporter of the 1955 Bandung Conference. Joseph Stalin's death and the shift in Soviet policy under Khrushchev contributed to the mood of national reconciliation.

U Nu then turned the communist peace offensive to his advantage and came up with a very successful "arms for democracy" offer. Tatmadaw (Burma Armed Forces) offensives in early 1956, Operation Aung Thura ("Valiant Victory") in Pakokku area and Operation Aung Tayza ("Glorious Victory") in Pathein area, had been partly successful. The year 1958 saw mass surrenders of first the Arakanese nationalists led by U Seinda, next the Pa-O, Mon, and Shan communists, but most importantly the PVO led by Bo Po Kun. The official figure was 5,500 armed insurgents that "entered the light", of which about 800 were white flag communists mainly in Sittwe, northern Rakhine State. The one crucial exception was the KNU.

=== 1962 coup d'état and peace parley ===
Ne Win's caretaker government presided over a general election in February 1960, which saw the return of U Nu to office after his faction of the Clean AFPFL, renamed the Union Party, won a landslide majority over the Stable AFPFL. Parliamentary democracy this time, however, lasted just two years before Ne Win staged a coup d'état on 2 March 1962. A major crackdown on the above-ground opposition followed, with most of the remaining leaders of the AFPFL and ethnic community leaders being rounded up and imprisoned. A peaceful student-led protest at Rangoon University on 7 July 1962 was brutally suppressed by the Tatmadaw, ending in a massacre of over 300 students by the students' accounts.

In the mid-1960s, the United States State Department estimated the CPB's membership to be approximately 5,000.

=== 1963 peace talks ===
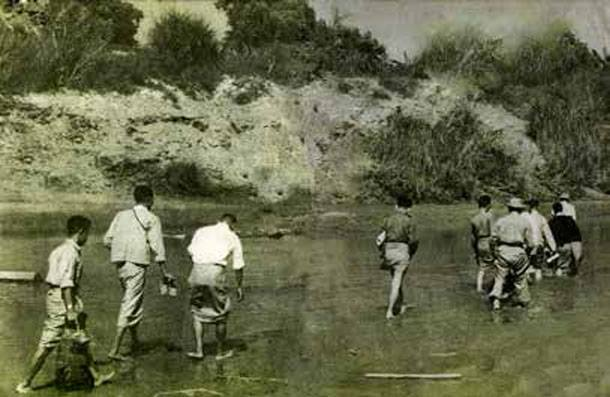
"They have gone back": Members of the CPB's delegation return to their bases after failed peace talks, c. November 1963.

As head of the Union Revolutionary Council (URC) government, Ne Win launched a peace offensive starting with a general amnesty on 1 April 1963. Bo Ye Htut, a member of the Thirty Comrades and the central military committee of the CPB who had been to Rangoon on a secret peace mission before the 1958 AFPFL split, took the offer together with Bo Ye Maung and Bo Sein Tin. The KNU split in the same month between the Karen National Unity Party (KNUP) and the Karen Revolutionary Council (KRC) led by Saw Hunter Tha Hmwe. The red flag communists' delegation was the first to arrive in Rangoon in June, later joined by the red flag leader Thakin Soe himself from Arakan in August. After just three meetings, the talks were abruptly ended by the URC on 20 August and the red flag communists were flown back to the Arakanese capital Sittwe.

Three CPB teams led by Bo Zeya, Yebaw Aung Gyi, Thakins Pu, and Ba Thein Tin arrived in July and September by air from China. These "Beijing returnees" were allowed to travel to the party's jungle headquarters in the Pegu Yoma near Paukkaung, where the leadership, reunited after 15 years, held a historic meeting of the central committee. Talks began on 2 September after the CPB delegation headed by the general secretary Yebaw Htay and the People's Army's chief of staff Bo Zeya arrived on 28 August. A second team, headed by Thakin Zin, politburo member and secretary of the NDUF, which agreed to negotiate as one team, arrived on 20 September. Meetings with the CPB and NDUF overshadowed those with other nationalities such as the Shan and Kachin delegations.

Talks broke down on 14 November, when the URC presented the CPB with the following demands:

1. All troops must be concentrated in a designated area.
2. No one can leave without permission.
3. All organisational work must stop.
4. All fundraising must stop.

Expectations had been running high, and the People's Peace Committee, set up by the NUF and supported by Thakin Kodaw Hmaing and former brigadier Kyaw Zaw, staged a Six-District Peace March in early November from Minhla to Rangoon. The marchers were cheered and applauded along the entire route by large crowds chanting anti-government slogans, and given food parcels collected by the Rangoon University Students Union (RUSU) and the All Burma Federation of Student Unions (ABFSU). When they reached Rangoon at a mass rally of 200,000 in front of city hall, speakers openly supported the NDUF's demand to keep its weapons and territory. Although at first the CPB and NDUF had misinterpreted Ne Win's peace offensive as a sign of weakness desperate for a solution, once they arrived in Rangoon they realised it was going to be a mainly cosmetic exercise. They therefore took the opportunity to re-establish contacts and meet family and friends.

Over 900 people, mostly BWPP and NUF activists, were arrested in the immediate aftermath. Thaton Hla Pe, leader of the Union Pa-O National Organisation (UPNO), former leader of the Pa-O National Organisation (PNO), and one of the main organisers of the peace march, was among the arrested, as was Nai Non Lar, the former leader of the Mon People's Front (MPF). By the end of the year over 2,000 were believed to have been imprisoned. Almost the entire executive committees of the RUSU and the ABFSU fled to join the CPB.

=== The CPB's "Cultural Revolution" (1964–1968) ===
Frustrated with the failure of the 1963 peace talks and inspired by Cultural Revolution in China, Thakin Than Tun ordered the party to begin its own "Cultural Revolution". The party abandoned its previous position of "peace and unity" and returned to a revolutionary Maoist line. A mass campaign of purges and summary executions immediately followed, characterised by the Rangoon press as a policy of "purge, dismiss, and eliminate". Much of the party's old guard, as well as several student leaders who had joined the CPB after the failed 1963 peace talks, were killed under the orders of Thakin Than Tun.

==== Internal ideological struggles ====
The CPB's leadership conducted a review of its "peace and unity" line in 1964. They did so for several reasons, including the failure of the 1963 peace talks, the government's intensification of its campaign of political repression and military offensives, and most importantly Ne Win's founding of the Burma Socialist Programme Party (BSPP) with the help of former communists. The CPB's willingness to carry out an armed struggle was the main difference between it and the above-ground leftist opposition parties such as the BWPP and NUF. Thakin Ba Tin, Yèbaw Htay, and Bo Yan Aung led the minority faction that questioned the need to continue the armed struggle, while Thakin Than Tun, Thakin Zin, Thakin Chit, and Bo Zeya formed the majority faction which argued for a return to a Maoist revolutionary line. The majority faction was reinforced by the Beijing returnees led by Yèbaw Aung Gyi, a former Rangoon University Student Union (RUSU) leader whose detailed analysis of the party's history up until that point was adopted as the "1964 line" at a central committee meeting near Nattalin, Bago Region, from 9 September to 14 October 1964. The 1964 line maintained that the CPB upheld a development of Marxism–Leninism which was independent from that of other countries and based on the concrete situation in Burma.

At this important meeting, which 11 out of the 20 central committee members were able to attend, a unanimous agreement was reached by the attendees to reaffirm Burma's status as "semi-colonial" after her "pseudo-independence" from the United Kingdom, and the primacy of the armed struggle against Ne Win's "armed counter-revolution". The party would establish a broad united front between the country's ethnic minorities and peasants, with the key task being party building.

==== Relations with China and the CCP ====
The CPB sided with the Chinese Communist Party (CCP) from the onset of the Sino-Soviet split, rejecting the 1955 "revisionist" line of the Communist Party of the Soviet Union (CPSU). On the 50th anniversary of the Bolshevik Revolution, the CPB denounced the CPSU for supporting Ne Win's "pseudo-socialism".

Burma's insurgent groups, communist and ethnonationalist alike, became increasingly receptive to the Maoist concept of a "people's war". The CPB began identifying so closely with the CCP that it became the CCP's most important ally among the communist parties in the region, more so after the start of China's Cultural Revolution, which the CPB replicated. The CPB's Cultural Revolution was perceived by many Burmese as an attempt by China to intrude into Burmese affairs, a sentiment which led to the violent 1967 anti-Chinese riots in Burma. By the time the riots were quelled, 31 Chinese civilians had been killed and several Chinese-owned businesses had been burned down. The riots in turn were a catalyst for further Chinese support of the CPB.

Recommitting itself to Mao Zedong Thought, in 1965 the CPB began constructing rural bases called "Red Power areas", managed by "hardcore" activists who would encircle the cities from the countryside and eventually launch a "final seizure of power" when conditions permitted. A central party school for political training in Mao Zedong Thought was established and its first course was taught on 25 March 1965. These efforts by the CPB were openly supported by the CCP, which provided the CPB with arms and funding during the 1960s and 1970s.

However, growing dissension within the party prompted Thakin Than Tun, Thakin Chit, and the Beijing returnees to meet on 16 August 1966 to decide on a strategy to remedy this "issue". Drawing on the practices of China's Red Guards, they established youth teams and handpicked the university and high school students who would lead the party's majority faction in purging their opponents.

==== Purges ====
Several senior party officials were labelled "revisionists" and purged during the CPB's Cultural Revolution. Thakin Ba Tin and Yèbaw Htay were suspended from the politburo on 27 April 1967, while a number of other senior members, such as Yèbaw Ba Khet, left the party, sensing the impending danger. Thakin Ba Tin was summarily tried and executed on 18 June 1967, followed by Yèbaw Htay, whose own son formed part of the execution squad. They were dubbed "Burma's Deng Xiaoping and Liu Shaochi", respectively. Thakin Than Tun and the remaining politburo passed a resolution on 15 December 1967 to adopt the "intraparty revolutionary line" and ordered party cadres across the country to carry out their own purges. Bo Yan Aung, who accompanied Aung San to Xiamen in search of military training abroad and was the first of the Thirty Comrades, was the next major victim of the purges on 26 December 1967. In August 1968, Bo Tun Nyein, who had led the executions of Thakin Ba Tin, Yèbaw Htay and Bo Yan Aung, was himself executed after being charged with "trying to set up a rival party headquarters". Former leaders of the RUSU, such as Aung Thein Naing (nephew of Bo Yan Aung) and Soe Win (son of Ludu U Hla and Ludu Daw Amar), met the same fate the next month.

==== Aftermath of the purges ====
Ne Win's government took advantage of the chaos and confusion within the CPB and launched a massive military offensive against the party in 1968, which resulted in the deaths of several more senior CPB officials. Bo Zeya, by that time the chief of staff of the People's Army, was killed in action on 16 April 1968, in a battle on the city borders of Pyay and Tharrawaddy. Yèbaw Tun Maung (Dr. Nath), the other Bengali founding member of the CPB besides Yèbaw Htay, was killed in action later the same year, near Hpyu in the Pegu Yoma. On 24 September 1968, while on the run from government troops, Thakin Than Tun was shot dead by one of his own bodyguards, who later surrendered to Ne Win's government. The assassin had joined the CPB just two years prior as an army deserter.

In the late 1960s, the CPB arrived in the Wa hills of northern Burma and forged alliances with several Wa insurgent leaders. At the time, the region experienced little internecine warfare, and there were few attacks by the Tatmadaw.

==== The North East Command ====
China's support for the CPB resulted in its North-Eastern Command, headed by the vice-chairman of the party, Thakin Ba Thein Tin, ballooning in strength and becoming the largest force in the country with 20,000 soldiers under its command. Within the first five years of its existence, it seized control over thousands of square miles of rugged terrain, but was unable to link up with the CPB's central command in central Burma, which prevented a potential communist victory in Burma. The strategy of the CPB in the North-East was to establish base areas on the border which would then link up with the central command of the party, and this was to be done though gaining the support of the minorities of the border areas. This involved recruiting veteran minorities, some of whom like Naw Seng of the Kachin Rifles, had fought against the CPB before, into positions to advance in the north-east. Naw Seng's recruitment boosted minority support for the CPB, however their approach to the Kachin areas in North-West Burma fell into some significant pitfalls. Primarily, by prompting the defection of several Kachin notables to the party, they entered into a long war with the local Kachin ethnic armies which prevented a linakge with CPB forces in the west of the country.

However, the North-East Command enjoyed successes elsewhere. For instance, when entering the Kokang areas in January 1968, the CPB enlisted the support of Pheung Kya-Shin who defected to the CPB and gave the party control over the Kokang substate. However, it would be Kya-Shin who in 1989 would begin the mutinies that would dissolve the North East Command.

As part of its campaign, the NEC also fought the junta of Ne Win at the Shan state in a series of extremely bloody battles where the junta lost 1,105 troops and a fighter jet, while the CPB lost 500 people over 100+ battles. This pushed the CPB to adapt by filtering its troops through secret roads in the forests. By 1973, over 500,000 minority villagers were under the CPB, with tens of thousands between them taking part in unions and CPB militias. However, the rapid advance of the CPB in the North East declined after 1975.

=== 1970s ===
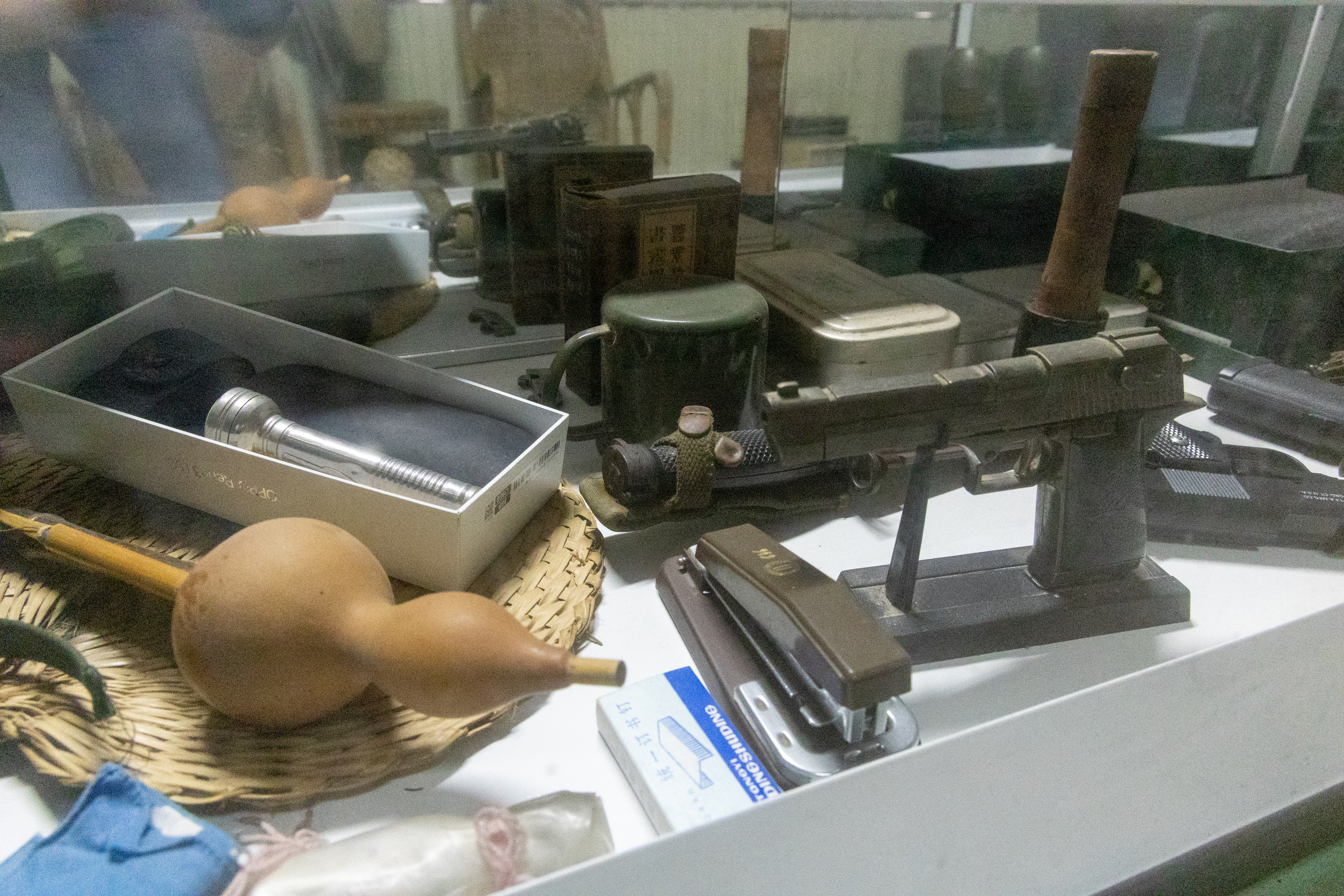
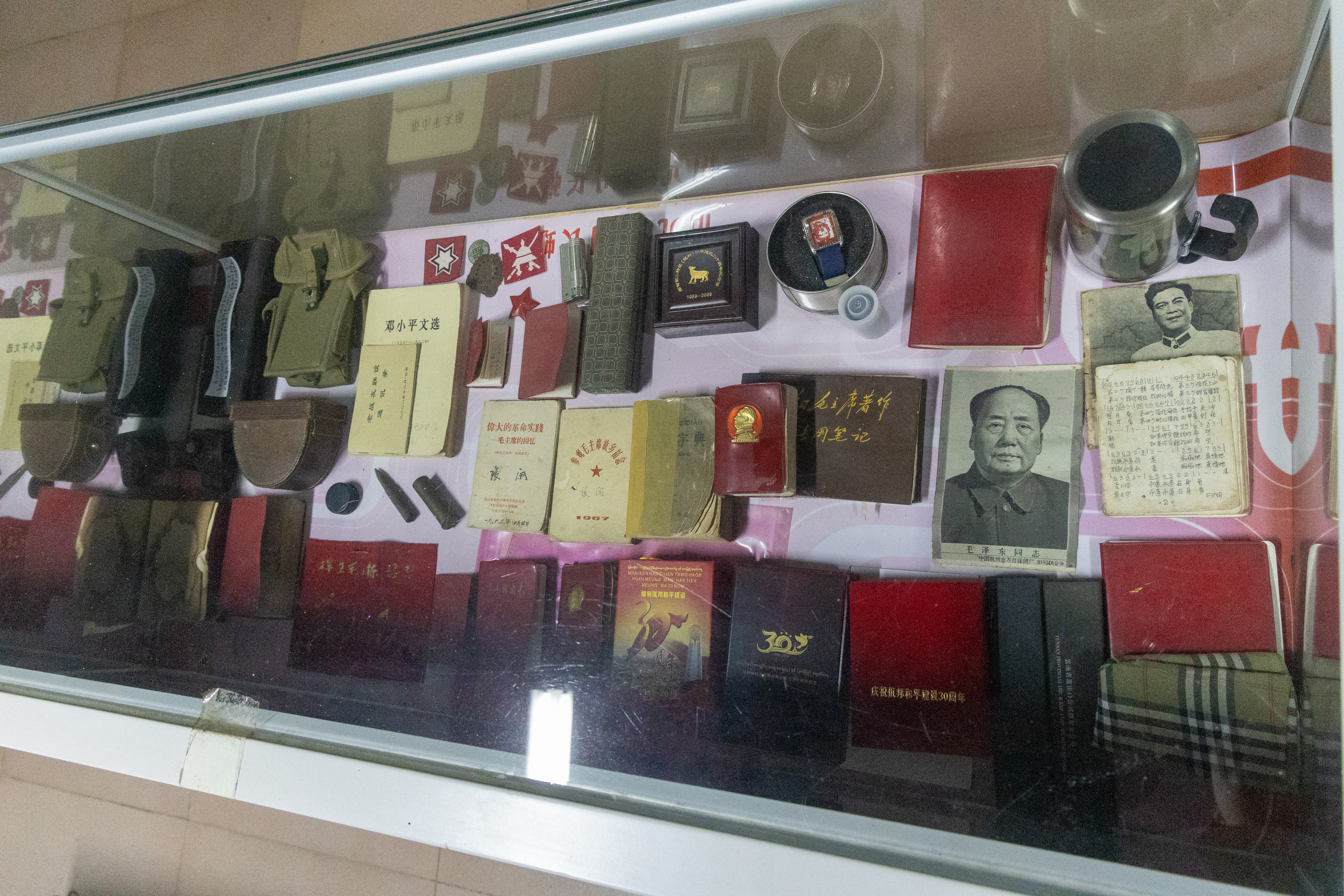
Items used by CPB soldiers in the 1970s, collected by former soldier Zhang Jianzhang

The ethnic makeup of the CPB radically changed in the early 1970s, and the party "essentially [became] an ethnic minority organisation". Before the 1970s, the party was predominantly Bamar with a Bamar-majority leadership and headquarters in the Bamar heartland. It had minimal contact with the ethnic armies of the border areas; arrangements were made with a few Karen groups, but the party had virtually no contact with the Kachin or Shan groups, which had been active since the 1950s. The CPB's dwindling membership was eventually replenished by Kachin, Shan, and Wa cadres in the early 1970s. Anticipating a major Tatmadaw offensive, the leaders of the three ethnic minorities sought to unite under one organisation; the CPB was a favourable target for co-opting due to the then recent demise of its Bamar leadership. The CPB moved its activities to Burma's border with China, and by 1973, the party's membership had become predominantly Wa. Most of the CPB's new leaders had no previous contact with the party's pre-Cultural Revolution leadership, leading analysts at the time to regard the pre- and post-Cultural Revolution parties as "two different organisations".

In the late 1970s, the CPB began a series of offensives into central Burma to try and re-establish a central command there. The CPB had claimed to have a casualty-ratio against the junta of 4–1 in its favour. Subsequently, the CPB established a presence in Mogok, Mong Hsu, Kehsi Mansam, Kunhing, Laikha and Loilem, Kokang, Kengtung and Mong Yang, However, these successes were limited because the CPB's supply lines were stretched by these offensives and could not establish a firm base there. The junta responded in November 1979 in a counter-attack under Operation King Conqueror, however casualties were high and they were unable to dent their defeneses.

The CPB had 10,000 to 14,000 troops during the 1970s. Its base in the Pegu Yoma was destroyed in a 1975 Tatmadaw offensive.

In this period, the CPB though initially being against poppy cultivation and warlordism, began to liberalise its crackdown on poppy cultivation. However, this would be reversed yet again in 1985 by prohibiting party members from taking part in the trade, and the death-penalty on large-scale traffickers.

=== 1980–1981 peace parley ===
Shortly after Burma resigned from the Non-Aligned Movement in protest against Soviet and Vietnamese "manipulation" at the September 1979 Havana Conference, the Chinese Foreign Minister Huang Hua paid a visit to Rangoon. Ne Win announced an amnesty in 1980, which saw the return of U Nu and others from Thailand. The CPB responded with an attack on Mong Yawng, but proposed talks in September after letting the amnesty expire. The first meeting took place in Beijing in October between the teams led by Ba Thein Tin and Ne Win, who paid a surprise visit to China leaving the Kachin delegation in the middle of the talks in Rangoon. At the second meeting, headed by Thakin Pe Tint of the CPB and Maj. Gen. Aye Ko of the BSPP, the following May in Lashio, three new conditions were put on the table by Aye Ko:

1. The abolition of the CPB.
2. The abolition of the People's Army under the command of the CPB.
3. The abolition of all the "liberated areas".

The CPB was told that, according to Article 11 of the 1974 Constitution, which had established Burma as a one-party state, there was no place for another political party. Ne Win ended the peace talks on 14 May and let the ceasefire deadline of 31 May with the KIO pass without replying to the Kachin position. There had been no ceasefire agreement with the CPB.

Across the border in China, the CPB-sympathetic "Voice of the People of Burma" (VOPB) began to broadcast appeals for ending the insurgency in Burma, developing democracy in the country, and building national unity in a new multi-party system. The CPB still commanded 15,000 troops in the northeast, and the Tatmadaw, after resuming the Operation King Conqueror belatedly in 1982 and having suffered losses amounting to several hundred in the Kengtung-Tangyang area from CPB counter-attacks, finally retreated. Both sides now faced another challenge in the rising strength of the NDF formed in 1976, pointedly excluding the Bamar, by the ethnic insurgencies uniting the Karen, Mon, Kachin, Shan, Pa-O, Karenni, Kayan, Wa, and Lahu, particularly with the return of the KIO in 1983 after its separate peace talks with the BSPP failed. This finally led to the CPB reaching an agreement with the NDF in 1986.

=== 1985 rectification ===
Third flag of the CPB, introduced at the party's third congress in 1985

In November 1978, Thakin Ba Thein Tin presented a "political report" at a historic meeting of the politburo held in Panghsang, unanimously approved at the central committee meeting in early 1979. It formed the basis of the resolutions passed in September 1985 at the CPB's third congress, 40 years since the last one in Rangoon, attended by just 170 of the party's estimated 5,000 members.

- The party's past errors of the 1955 "revisionist" line and the 1964 "intra-party revolutionary line" were now admitted.
- Ne Win's regime was characterised as representing "imperialism, feudal-landlordism and bureaucratic capitalism".
- The primacy of the armed struggle, Mao Zedong Thought, and China's example were reaffirmed.
- Soviet "socialism-imperialism" and Vietnam's "hegemonism" were to be resisted as much as "US imperialism". The CPB had supported the Khmer Rouge and written to both the Vietnamese and Cambodian parties, urging them to settle their dispute peacefully. Ne Win, for his part in playing the China card, also happened to be the first head of state to pay a visit to Phnom Penh after the Khmer Rouge came to power.

The party's general programme was revised in light of "the experiences of the last 30 years of the armed struggle".

- It warned against "sectarianism" and "leftist" and "rightist deviationism".
- The party's constitution was revised to "suit the changing conditions" of the world.
- New "party building", "military" and "agricultural" lines were adopted.
  - Party membership had failed to fulfill the 1964 directive of recruiting at least one member from every village.
  - The new military line would be "strategic defence" at a time when the party was weak and the enemy strong.
  - Because Burma was still a "backward semi-colonial, semi-feudal, agrarian country with uneven political and economic development", "agrarian revolution" with the slogan "land to the tillers" was still the basis of a "people's war" waged by building up Red Power areas and encircling the cities. In insisting on not "copying the October Revolution of Russia" by calling a "general strike and uprising" (in Burmese, thabeikson thabonhta), it appeared to have ignored the recent upheavals of 1974–1976 in the cities.

In 1986, a proper alliance had formed between all ethnic armed organisations and the CPB against the junta.

=== 8888 Uprising ===
By 1987, the isolationist policies of Ne Win's "Burmese Way to Socialism" had decimated Burma's economy, and the United Nations designated the country as one of the world's least developed. Simmering discontent among the Burmese populace over the years was compounded by yet another round of demonetisation in late 1987. Protests and marches against the government began earnestly on 12 March 1988 and culminated in a nationwide uprising on 8 August 1988. The protesters succeeded in pressuring Ne Win and most BSPP officials to resign from their offices, but the Tatmadaw, after accusing the protesters of being communist agitators, seized power in a coup d'état on 18 September 1988 and violently suppressed the demonstrations.

CPB politburo member Kyin Maung was forthright in admitting the presence of party cadres in the cities during demonstrations, but he asserted that the Military Intelligence Service (MIS) had greatly exaggerated the party's role in the uprising. The CPB had begun advocating a multiparty system after 1981, and on 28 March 1988 it called for a provisional government composed of various opposition groups and figures. The students' calls for the military to create an interim government and to hold multiparty elections fell on deaf ears, and the failure of U Nu and Aung San Suu Kyi to achieve a united opposition sealed the fate of the uprising.

During the uprising, communists and moderate leftists were active organisers and supporters of the democracy movement and strike committees in the cities. Kyin Maung stated, "We had never said that we initiated the upheavals. Nor did we say that our cadres comprised the leading core. On the contrary, we firmly believe that the upheavals had so much impact only because all the forces for democracy took part. Marxism holds that it is the people who make history." Neither the CPB nor the NDF was able to take advantage of the crisis that the government found itself in, as the former was evidently unprepared for an urban uprising as opposed to a peasant war, and many ethnic armed groups regarded the uprising as an internal Bamar issue. The CPB attempted to establish a new armed wing, the Democratic Patriotic Army (DPA), but it failed to gain traction.

Before the mutinies, the Communist Party of Burma reported quickening success in other parts of Burma after the suppression of the protests. In Tenasserim and Arakan, local CPB cadres were being welcomed by villagers as they advanced, and underground urban cells noted growing success in Mandalay, Monywa and several other towns in the north.

=== 1989 mutiny ===
Fighting broke out between the CPB and the new military junta in Burma after the crushing of the 8888 Uprising, involving brutal fighting in the countryside. While the CPB gained a stunning victory at Kongsa, near Kutkai, wiping out a column of the 3rd Infantry Battalion of the Tatmadaw, this did not end the war-weariness of many of the ethnic forces in the CPB's armies who began to see the CPB as a Bamar organisation using non-Bamars as cannon fodder. The defections thereby began on 12 March 1989 among the Kokang and spread from there. For example, mutineers among the Wa people clarified they believed the CPB's approach to the minorities up until 1979 was the correct one, but now no longer did and thus they would break away.

On 16 April 1989, a group of mutineers stormed the party headquarters in Panghsang and destroyed portraits of communist leaders and copies of communist literature. Many party members, including the senior leadership, were forced into exile and fled across the border into China. The party's ethnic Wa leaders in Panghsang, including Bao Youxiang and Zhao Nyi Lai, founded the Burma Nationalities Democratic Solidarity Party and Burma Nationalities Democratic United Army – and later the United Wa State Army. Splinter groups led by Pheung Kya-shin and Sai Leun broke away and formed the Myanmar National Democratic Alliance Army and National Democratic Alliance Army, respectively. For many, the mutinies were presented as breaks with the CPB, but not communism as a whole. For example, the Wa mutineers sought support from China, emphasising they were not against communist nations.

The mutinies and collapse of the CPB in 1989 also helped the junta, as it was able to turn its attention on the NLD insurgency that had arisen against its repression of the 8888 Uprising.

=== Post-1989 ===
Before the start of the civil war in 2021, the CPB began pursuing a policy of rearmament and reconstruction in Myanmar. Youth leaders of the All Burma Federation of Student Unions from Shwebo District, Sagaing Region, declared their commitment to communism and prepared to re-establish an armed resistance in early 2017. These individuals would go on to lead the re-establishment of the CPB's PLA. The PLA then received training from the Kachin Independence Army in 2018.

=== Post-2021 coup ===
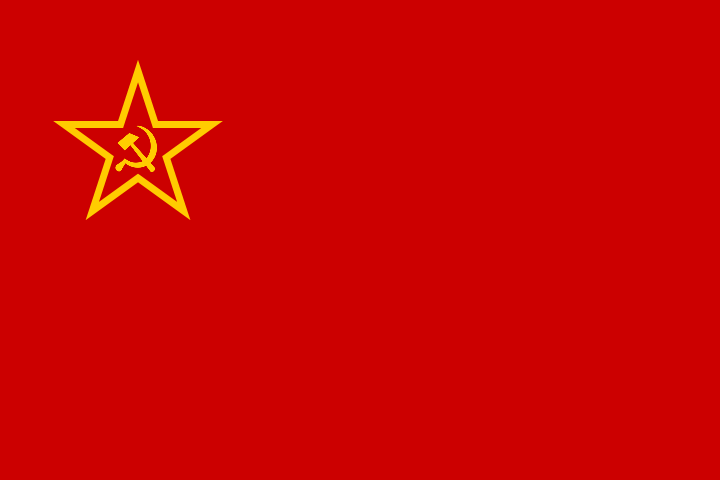
Flag of the People's Liberation Army

The Tatmadaw overthrew Myanmar's civilian government in a coup d'état on 1 February 2021 and installed a junta named the State Administration Council (SAC) in its place. The CPB subsequently released a statement on the same day, condemning the coup and calling for a united front against the Tatmadaw.

Party cadres reentered Myanmar through the country's border with China on 15 March 2021. Five months later in August 2021, the CPB announced that it had rearmed itself and established a new armed wing, the People's Liberation Army (PLA), to wage a people's war against the SAC. In a 2025 interview with the Democratic Voice of Burma, PLA general secretary Ni Ni Kyaw stated that the PLA was reconstituted to "eliminate fascists [and the] military dictatorship, and to liberate all groups of Myanmar people from oppression". She noted that the PLA was fighting in numerous areas, including northern Shan State and the Mandalay, Sagaing, Magway and Tanintharyi regions.

The PLA has remained independent of the People's Defence Force (PDF) but has associated and maintained friendly relations with them. The National Unity Government, which the PDF is allegiant to, also has cordial ties with the PLA, allowing people to send it donations through NUG Pay, an NUG-devised payment app.

== Ideology ==
The CPB is a communist party that subscribes to Marxism–Leninism and Maoism (officially called Mao Zedong Thought). The party is against ethnonationalism and separatism, arguing that Myanmar should be united as a federal state with autonomous regions reserved for the country's ethnic minorities.

== Leadership ==
=== Historical ===
==== Chairpersons ====
1. Thakin Than Tun
2. Thakin Zin
3. Thakin Ba Thein Tin

==== General secretaries ====
1. Thakin Aung San
2. Thakin Soe
3. Thakin Thein Pe (Thein Pe Myint)
4. Yèbaw Htay
5. Yèbaw Kyin Maung

=== Current ===
==== General secretary ====
1. Htun Set

==== Spokespersons ====
1. Po Than Gyaung

== Election results ==
Constituent Assembly
Election	Leader	Seats	Votes
1947	Thakin Than Tun	7 / 210	126,000
