= People's Liberation Army (Myanmar) =

Armed wing of the CPB in Myanmar

- ပြည်သူ့လွတ်မြောက်ရေးတပ်မတော်
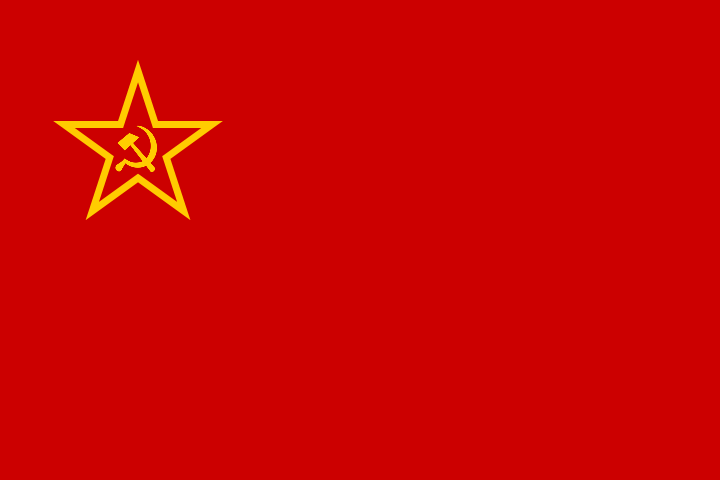
- Other name: PLA
- Leader: Ni Ni Kyaw (General Secretary)
- Founded: 15 March 2021
- Country: Myanmar (Burma)
- Allegiance: Communist Party of Burma
- Active regions: 1 state, 4 regions: Magway Region; Mandalay Region; Naypyidaw Union Territory; Sagaing Region; Shan State; Tanintharyi Region; China–Myanmar border
- Ideology: Communism; Marxism–Leninism; Maoism; Federalism
- Political position: Far-left
- Size: 1,000 troops (2023); 3,000 troops (2025)

The People's Liberation Army (abbr. PLA; Burmese: ပြည်သူ့လွတ်မြောက်ရေးတပ်မတော်) is a communist rebel group in Myanmar that adheres to Marxism–Leninism and Maoism (officially Mao Zedong Thought). It is the armed wing of the underground Communist Party of Burma, whose cadres rearmed themselves after the Tatmadaw (Myanmar military) overthrew the civilian government in 2021.

"People's Liberation Army" was also the name of the Communist Party of Burma's first militant arm, which was named after the People's Liberation Army of China.

== History ==
=== Predecessors ===
The Communist Party of Burma (CPB) waged an insurgency, primarily in Shan State, from 1948 to 1989. At the beginning, the party's armed wing was named the People's Liberation Army (PLA), homonymous with the People's Liberation Army of China founded around the same time. In September 1950, the PLA merged with regiments of the Revolutionary Burma Army commanded by the communist Bo Zeya, and formed the People's Army. The People's Army was disbanded after a 1989 mutiny which forced the CPB's leaders into exile in China. The MNDAA and United Wa State Army formed from these splits.

=== 2021 refoundation ===
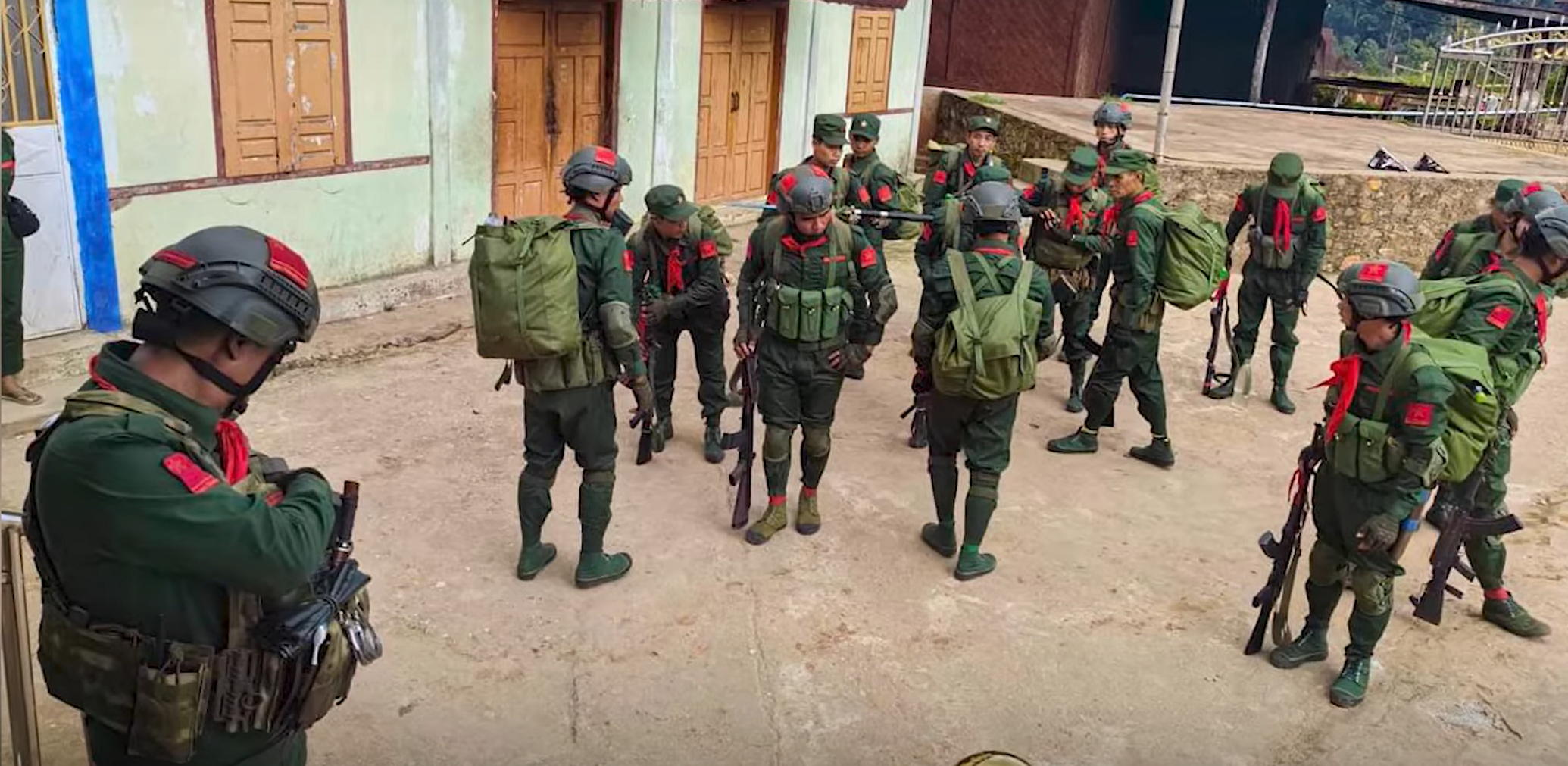
PLA troops in 2024

The roots of the PLA's refoundation came from before the civil war. In 2017, youth leaders of the All Burma Federation of Student Unions from Shwebo District, Sagaing Region, declared their commitment to Communism and began aiming to rebuild Marxist armed resistance in Myanmar. They contacted the Kachin Independence Army (KIA) in 2018 and received training in Laiza. Underground members of the CPB also continued militant activity, with most of the underground members being from before the 1989 party split.

The Tatmadaw deposed the democratically elected members of Myanmar's civilian government in a coup d'état on 1 February 2021, and established a junta named the State Administration Council (SAC). The CPB subsequently released a statement on the same day, condemning the coup and calling for a united front against the Tatmadaw.

CPB cadres reentered Myanmar through the country's border with China in March 2021. Five months later, in August 2021, the CPB announced that it had rearmed itself and established a new armed wing to wage a people's war against the SAC. The party chose the PLA name as a call back to their previous armed resistance. The KIA provided the PLA troops with their initial supply of weapons and equipment.

The PLA claimed in 2023 to have an active force of 1,000 troops. At that time, it was fighting alongside the People's Defence Force in Tanintharyi Region. On 27 October 2023, the PLA participated in the Three Brotherhood Alliance's 'Operation 1027' in northern Shan State and with the MNDAA and TNLA in the capture of Lashio and Mongmit.

From July to September 2024, the PLA allowed 138 elephants and their human handlers to take refuge in its camp near Mandalay. The handlers had fled from junta-run timber camps, where the elephants were used to transport logs through dense jungle. The PLA stated that it intended to protect the elephants from traffickers and the handlers from the Tatmadaw until the junta is overthrown.

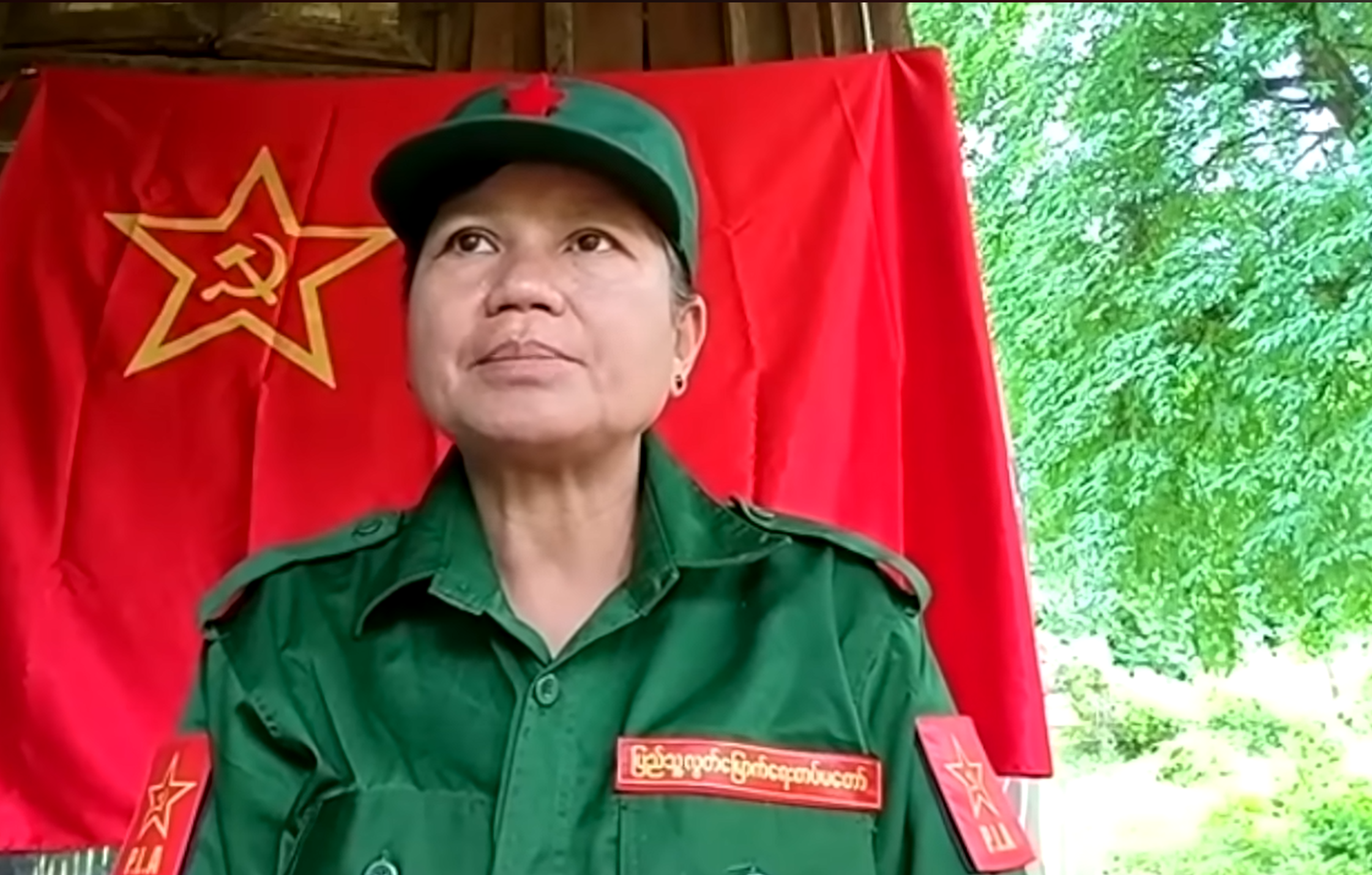
PLA General Secretary Ni Ni Kyaw

In a 2025 interview with the Democratic Voice of Burma, PLA general secretary Ni Ni Kyaw stated that the PLA was reconstituted to "eliminate fascists [and the] military dictatorship, and to liberate all groups of Myanmar people from oppression". She noted that the PLA was fighting in numerous areas, including northern Shan State and the Mandalay, Sagaing, Magway and Tanintharyi regions.

On 10 June 2025, the PLA shot down a junta fighter jet during the battle for Kan Dauk police station in Pale Township, Sagaing Region, the tenth such shoot down since 2021. Kan Duak was heavily bombed during the PLA's campaign in the area, with 200 air strikes and 500 bombs dropped, alongside the use of Jet fighter, Y12 bombers, MI35 attack helicopters and paratroopers. By 19 June, the PLA had taken the village and pushed out junta forces. The station is located on the central ASEAN highway and is the second largest police station in the Pale Township, acting as a highly militarised and fortified compound with minefields and trenches before its capture. The PLA was assisted in the takeover of Kan Dauk by the All Burma Students' Democratic Front, People's United Front, Burma Liberation Democratic Front, Thapyataw People's Defense Force (PDF), the People's Revolutionary Armed Forces and the Anyar Strategic Battalion.

By August 2025, the PLA announced that it was capable of actively fighting throughout all parts of the country.

On 22 June 2026, PLA camps were raided by People's Defence Force units under the National Unity Government (NUG's) Myingyan District Command. The raids happened after the family of Than Htay Aung reported his capture by the PLA to NUG's Public Security Bureau on 26 May. According to the PLA, Than Htay Aung served as an informant to the Tatmadaw. Although 3 PDF fighters were reportedly hit by mines, no shots were fired. Than Htay Aung was subsequently released. NUG officials claimed that the PLA threatened harm against him if a 2000 lakh kyat ransom was not paid. The CPB condemned NUG for starting infighting among anti-Tatmadaw groups.

== Ideology ==
Like its mother party, the PLA adheres to Marxism–Leninism and Maoism. The PLA opposes ethnonationalism and separatism, arguing that Myanmar should be united as a federal state with autonomous regions reserved for the country's ethnic minorities.
