= Browderism =

American variant of Marxism–Leninism

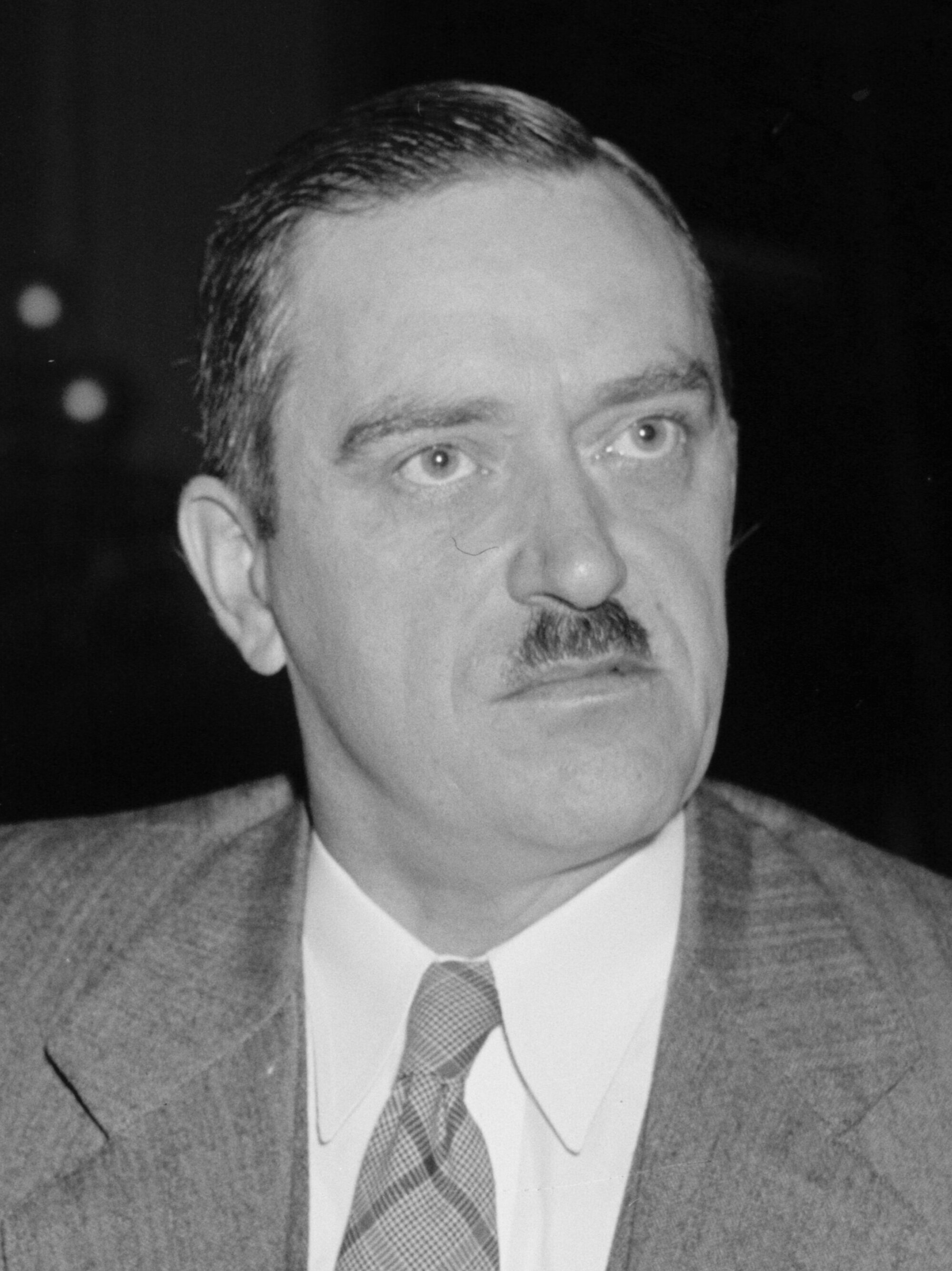
Earl Browder, after whom Browderism is named

Browderism refers to the variant of Marxism–Leninism developed in the 1940s by American communist politician Earl Browder, who led the Communist Party USA (CPUSA) from 1930 to 1945. It was characterized by its deviations from traditional Marxist–Leninist positions on class conflict and the role of the communist party. Browderism aligned the CPUSA with mainstream American politics and contemporary events; this involved incorporating Americanism and its nationalist values into the party's message and strategies.

During the 1940s, the CPUSA was liquidated into the Communist Political Association (CPA) and supported peaceful coexistence towards the beginning of the Cold War. In the communist world, particularly Latin America, parties also began pursuing class collaboration and internal reorganization. However, in 1945, the French communist magazine Les Cahiers du communisme published the 'Duclos letter' (attributed to Jacques Duclos), which attacked the party's policies and liquidation as revisionist. Browder was then expelled from the party, leading to a snap election in July, where Stalinist member William Z. Foster was re-elected as party leader and reverted back to traditional policies. Since the 1940s, Browderism has remained scrutinized in the communist world by anti-revisionists (including within the CPUSA) as indicative of American exceptionalism, and accusing Browder's leadership of betraying the American labor movement.

== History ==
=== Beginning of Browder's leadership ===
Earl Russell Browder became General Secretary of the Communist Party USA in 1930, and served as the party's unilateral leader and public face throughout his leadership—coinciding with the Great Depression and presidency of Franklin D. Roosevelt. The CPUSA's initial hostility to the New Deal resembled the theory of social fascism, attacking Roosevelt's policies in their 1934 manifesto while claiming Roosevelt's program to be "in political essence and direction [...] the same" as that of Adolf Hitler. Browder clarified in a 1933 pamphlet on social fascism that fascism in general was "the dictatorship of finance capital", and therefore Roosevelt and Hitler were the same in how "both are executives of finance capital". Browder also attacked the Socialist Party of America (SPA) and its 1932 presidential nominee Norman Thomas, accusing him of "cover[ing] up the class character of democracy by contrasting it with fascist dictatorship as if capitalist rule were not the essence of both", as well as "absolv[ing] the capitalist class of its fascist terror and mak[ing] it appear as a measure of self-defense against Communist provocation." Yet in 1935, coinciding with the 7th World Congress of the Comintern endorsing the popular front strategy, Browder in turn endorsed the New Deal, and described the political situation as between democracy and fascism, rather than socialism and capitalism.

While Browder continued to serve as the Communist nominee for the 1936 and 1940 presidential elections, he gave a public speech on January 6, 1935, outlining an alliance with the SPA. Browder formally proposed a large-scale united front between the two parties, recognizing how Thomas acknowledged specific issues for cooperation. Within the American Left, such an alliance was endorsed by The New Republic, arguing that a broad anti-fascist platform meant "agree[ing] with Mr. Browder that common action is imperative and that the way to unite is to unite; and with Mr. Thomas that the way to begin is on specific issues." Browder also sought to form new mass organizations to unite communists with other progressive forces, including the American League Against War and Fascism in 1933, and the Psychologists League and League of American Writers, both in 1935.

=== Americanism and World War II ===
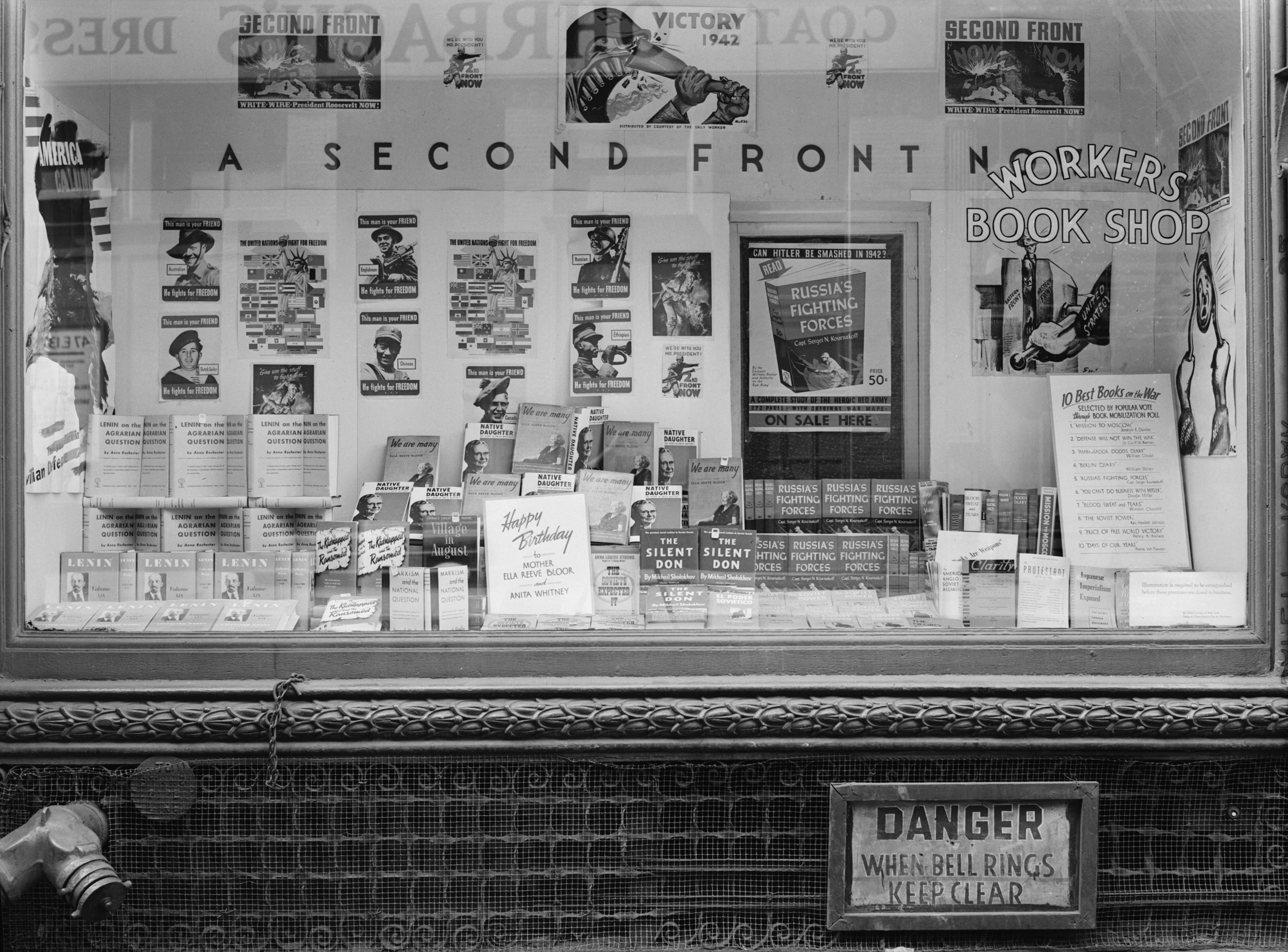
The CPUSA's "Workers' Bookshop" in New York City in 1942, with posters advocating for the U.S. to open a "second front" in Nazi-occupied Europe.

As this popular front strategy progressed leading up to World War II, Browder further de-emphasized Marxist rhetoric by utilizing American patriotism to appeal to a broader audience in U.S. politics. This coincided with Comintern policy under Joseph Stalin, which still supported the popular front strategy worldwide up until the Molotov–Ribbentrop Pact and the beginning of World War II. Due to the undermining of the Soviet Union's anti-fascist reputation, the CPUSA's ranks and recruitment numbers diminished. Browder was imprisoned in 1941; following his early release a year later, he returned to the general secretary position strongly in support of the American war effort, contrasted by the accusations of "imperialist war" the party had previously made. This led to the brief end of class conflict and beginning of class collaboration in Browder prioritizing the popular front in the party's appeal above all else. These tendencies of Browderism, emphasizing an uncompromising popular front and aim to popularize the party with Americans culminated in 1944, when the CPUSA was officially dissolved for a short time and was restructured into the Communist Political Association (CPA). This decision from Browder, though receiving unanimous support from the National Committee as a constitutional convention for the new organization was planned for May 1944, there was bitter opposition to this change in the form of the Foster-Darcy letter, co-signed by CPUSA factional rival William Z. Foster and Philadelphia District Organizer Samuel Adams Darcy. Limited circulation of the letter was tolerated within the party leadership, but it would later lead to Darcy's expulsion by a CPA committee headed by Foster, who submitted to party discipline as emphasized by Browder.

=== Fallout and decline ===
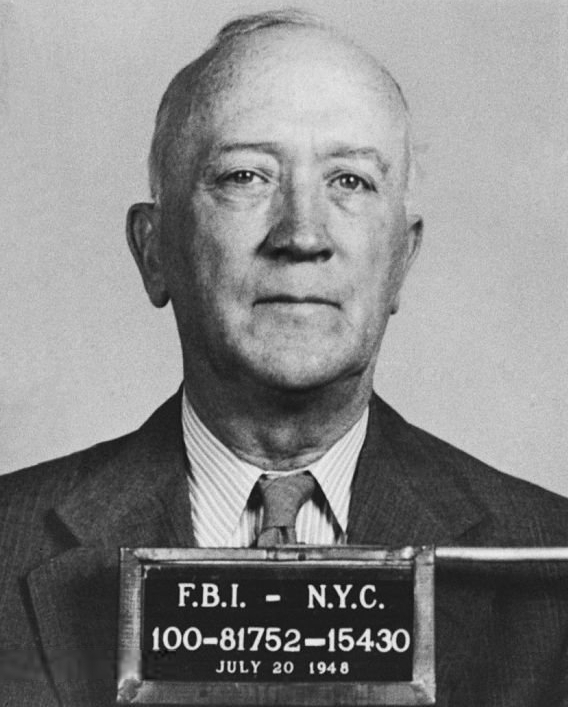
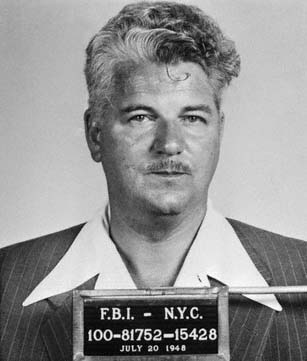
CPUSA chairman William Z. Foster (left) and general secretary Eugene Dennis (both pictured in 1948), Browder's successors who reversed his policies following the party's re-establishment.

Following the Tehran Conference in 1943, Browder hoped for the alliance between the Allied powers to continue after the war in peaceful coexistence, yet with the beginning of the Cold War and McCarthyism, Browderism became open to scrutiny. Jacques Duclos, Comintern member and leader of the French Communist Party (PCF) published an article in the party's theoretical magazine, Les Cahiers du communisme, attacking Browder's positions in what became known as the "Duclos letter". Quoting the Foster-Darcy letter, Duclos criticized Browder's beliefs about a harmonious post-war world as "erroneous conclusions in no wise flowing from a Marxist analysis of the situation", and that liquidating the CPUSA constituted a "notorious revision of Marxism". In retrospect, the article was found by historians Harvey Klehr, John Earl Haynes and Kyrill M. Anderson to have already been written in Russian and initiated by Moscow, after they determined post-war relations would become hostile. With the end of the Pacific War, Duclos was instructed to publish the article under his own name.

The article had major consequences for Browderism (sealing Browder's fate within the party) and the American communist movement, as the article had circulated worldwide among Comintern officials. The Communist Party USA was re-established at a snap election in July 1945, and Browder was removed from his position as general secretary, with Foster, who led the effort against Browderism, appointed as chairman and Eugene Dennis appointed as general secretary. Browder remained in the party, continuing to espouse Browderism in the form of Distributors Guide: Economic Analysis: A Service for Policy Makers, a weekly newsletter outlining his own vision for Soviet–American relations in contrast to the unfolding Cold War. This was considered to breach party discipline, and Browder was formally expelled from the CPUSA on February 5, 1946.

=== Legacy within the CPUSA ===
Browder died in June 1973. At this point, the Communist Party USA was under the leadership of Gus Hall, Browderism was fully removed from the party platform, as the party remained committed to traditional Marxism–Leninism. However, within Hall's policies, there were similarities with Browderism. This included a brief attempt to forge a "broad people's political movement", aligning the CPUSA in a new popular front with the civil rights movement and anti-Vietnam War movement to amass support among baby boomers. This would've tied the CPUSA, a by-product of the Old Left, with the New Left, yet was unsuccessful. Hall also coined the term "Bill of Rights socialism", advocating for socialist ideals to be incorporated into the U.S. Constitution. However, Hall did not cite Browderism as inspiration for these policies, as there are notable differences which reflect a different era, particularly as Hall was more restrained when deviating from tradition, being a committed Soviet ally. Joseph C. Mouledous noted how Hall advocated in 1961 for a united front policy, allying with different groups around certain political issues. Moreover, Hall stressed elsewhere the party's necessity not to take over such organizations, which Mouledous attributed to how "[t]he dangers of the united-front policy were made manifest during the Browder period, when the Party dissolved itself."

== Components ==
=== Popular front ===
Browderism supported the organization of a popular front, attracting middle-class forces towards socialism amidst the influence of reactionaries and fascism. This strategy was adopted by the Comintern from 1934 until the signing of the Molotov–Ribbentrop Pact in 1939, with examples of popular front governments briefly holding power in the 1930s including Spain, France and Chile. Browder's push for such a broad anti-fascist coalition was due to the rise of fascism in Europe and the popularity of the New Deal, which Browder was initially hostile to, but then came to seek an alliance with the New Dealers, despite orders from Moscow in September 1939 to oppose Roosevelt, leading to conflict within the CPUSA.

==== Class conflict and collaboration ====
Under Browderism, the need for class conflict against the bourgeoisie by the proletariat was de-prioritized and downplayed by the necessity for as broad a popular front as possible. This evolved into class collaboration, where distinctions between socioeconomic classes were put aside in favor of cooperation for an underlying goal, feeding into the need to resist fascism during World War II, as Browder justified in his 1942 book Victory and After. Browder's leadership made use of softer rhetoric more in line with terms used by the Roosevelt administration, such as "economic royalism".

=== Americanism ===
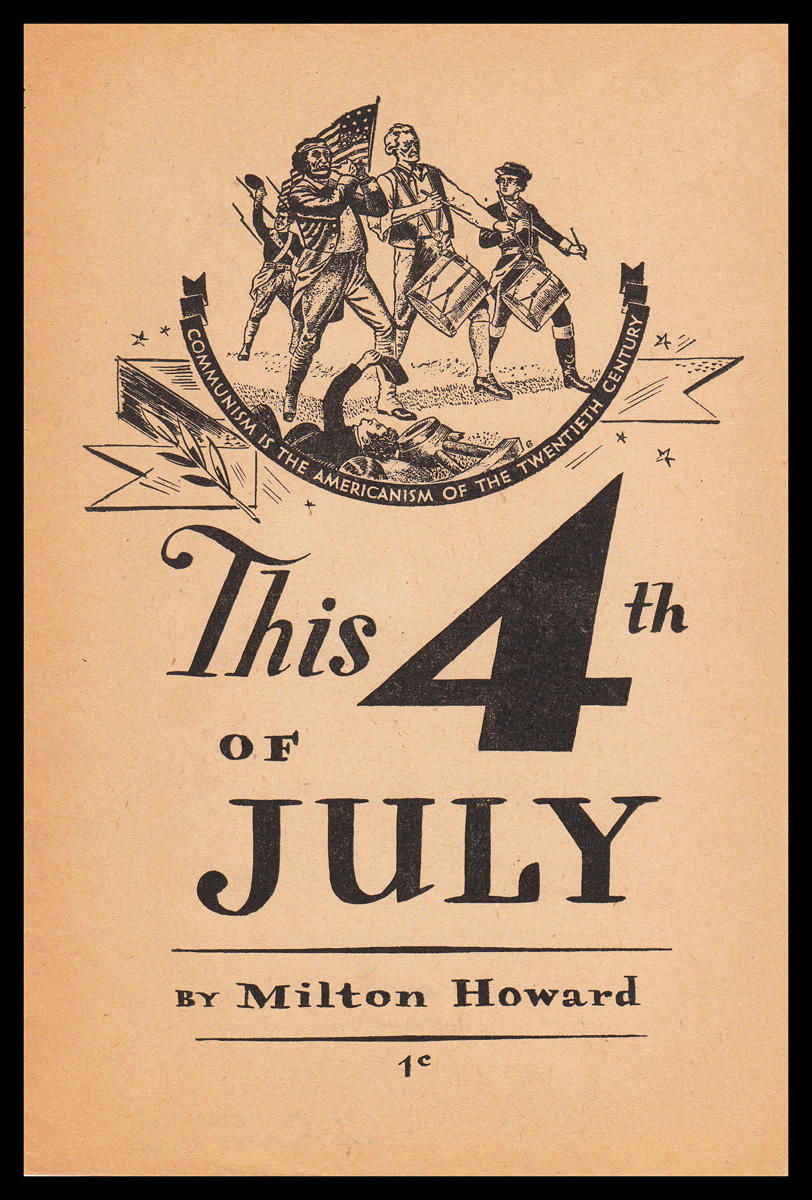
A "penny pamphlet" published by the CPUSA in the late 1930s appealing to American patriotism and synthesizing it with communism.

Browder utilized Americanism to promote the CPUSA's platform in accordance with traditional values of liberty and republicanism. In a New Masses article in June 1935, Browder positioned communism as part of the American revolutionary tradition:

We Communists claim the revolutionary traditions of Americanism. We are the only ones who continue those traditions and apply them to the problems of today. We are the Americans and Communism is the Americanism of the twentieth century.

— Earl Browder, What Is Communism? 8. Americanism—Who Are the Americans?, 1935

During the recession of 1937–1938, Browder re-affirmed his "full and complete support" of Roosevelt as an anti-fascist who could be relied on to prevent World War II, despite Roosevelt's reputational damage within the American Left. This caused tensions with Foster, who judged it as ill-timed with the recession. The CPUSA's liquidation into the CPA further exemplified the notion of a uniquely American approach to communism, disregarding the relevance of vanguardism and prioritizing electoral politics going forward.

=== Racial integration ===
The Browderist approach to race relations was unique within the CPUSA's history of strong relations with African Americans. According to Mouledous, the CPA diverged from the Leninist principle of self-determination for African Americans, instead advocating for social integration; Browder cited World War II as the opportunity, writing in 1944 for the Communist that "[t]he immediate achievement in this period, under the present American system, of complete equality for the Negroes, has been made possible by the war as a peoples' war of national liberation." Mouledous argues this approach amounted to class collaboration based on progressive tendencies.

== International influence ==
Browderism achieved a brief layer of international support, particularly in Latin America. Communist parties in Colombia, Cuba and Venezuela "most openly accepted the ideas of Earl Browder [and] quoted him by name" according to historian Manuel Caballero; this included class collaboration. In addition to Colombia and Cuba, communist parties in Jamaica, Puerto Rico and Greece reorganized under the CPA's model.

=== Colombia ===
Under the leadership of Augusto Durán, the Colombian Communist Party (PCC) was renamed as the 'Socialist Democratic Party' and committed itself to a popular front. The United States Department of State—recognizing the similar approach of the CPA—speculated that the 1943 dissolution of the Comintern would have led to the party being absorbed into that front. Similarly to the CPUSA's support for Roosevelt under Browder, Durán led the PCC's support of liberal Colombian president Alfonso López Pumarejo, and would later be criticized at the Communist Unity Congress in July 1946 following the Duclos letter.

=== Cuba ===
The Popular Socialist Party (PSP) adopted its own Browderist position on class collaboration with the publication of Colaboración entre Obreros y Patronos by Lázaro Peña, PSP executive member and general secretary of the Confederación de Trabajadores de Cuba (CTC). Based on a speech he gave to the National Association of Industrialists (ANIC), Peña argued that such collaboration between employees and employers was in Cuba's national economic interests following WWII. Soon after the CPA's formation in the U.S., PSP general secretary Blas Roca Calderio announced that he would begin cooperating with British and American investors, citing Browder as inspiration. When the Duclos letter was published, the PSP—along with the PCC—censured it in the Venezuelan communist newspaper ¡Aquí Está!. The PSP claimed that unlike in the U.S., their class collaboration was necessary as an "anti-imperialist alliance" due to Latin America's underdeveloped conditions. However, during Foster's address to the PSP's 3rd National Assembly in January 1946, Browderism was formally repudiated by the party.

=== Mexico ===
In his analysis of the Mexican Communist Party (PCM), historian Barry Carr stated that the extent to which Browderism had penetrated the party was limited and "built on developments that were already well in place", compared to other cases like the PSP in Cuba. The PCM maintained a policy of 'unity at all costs' following Browder's intervention in their withdrawal from the Confederación de Trabajadores de México (CTM) in 1937. The reunification process had resulted in the PCM's reduced influence in the CTM, and exemplified Browder's authority in the communist world. In 1944, under the leadership of Dionisio Encina, the PCM followed the model of the CPA in supporting the foundation of the Mexican Socialist League. The PCM leadership also made the controversial decision to dissolve its 'factory cells', whilst debating abandoning the term 'cell' altogether and changing its name to Partido Socialista (Socialist Party).

Carlos Sánchez Cárdenas, a high-ranking PCM member, informed the party about the situation covered by the Duclos letter based on his visits to France and the U.S., and denounced the party's reliance on advice from the CPA at the National Committee meeting on July 3, 1945. The following month, Sánchez Cárdenas prepared the 'Victory Resolution' on Browderism, in which he described Browder's influence in Mexico as "decisive". However, Encina criticized the resolution's "exaggerated tone", and the revised document accepted in May 1946 claimed the PCM had always rejected Browderism. This corresponded with the Duclos letter's assertion that Browder had exaggerated his independent authority.

=== United Kingdom ===
Outside of Latin America, Browderist influence in the Communist Party of Great Britain (CPGB) was partly a grassroots effort by the CPUSA, with Browder sending New Masses editor Joseph North to London to attend a World Federation of Trade Unions founding conference in February 1945 to advocate for its policies. A statement from the CPGB's leadership claimed that "advocates for the Browder line for Britain, including some enthusiastic adherents from the United States and other countries" supported the party's liquidation, akin to that of the CPUSA in 1944. Additionally, the party's response to the Duclos letter caused similar debate in Latin America as to whether its condemnation of Browderism was applicable to them.

During its 18th Congress in November 1945, the CPGB criticized Browderism, yet similarly to the PCM's handling of the issue, denied any notion that the ideology had significantly infiltrated party ranks. General secretary Harry Pollitt—a Stalinist—argued in his political report to the congress that Browder's proposals "assumed a basic change in the character of imperialism, denied its reactionary role, and held out a long-term perspective of harmonious capitalist development and class peace after the war, both for the United States and the world." Furthermore, Pollitt justified the CPGB's favorable portrayal of the CPUSA during the Browderist period as informed by camaraderie amid anti-communist political attacks, and that:

The line of Browder did exercise a limited influence in our Party, although in view of the statements of some comrades in our pre-Congress discussion that the Executive Committee of our Party succumbed to "Browderism", it is necessary to state publicly that we resisted definite attempts to import Browder's basic ideas into our Party by some of our own comrades.

— Harry Pollitt, Communist Policy for Britain, 1945

Historian Neil Redfern challenges Pollitt's portrayal of events by noting how his "theses had not been essentially significantly different from Browder's ideas", pointing to Pollitt's revisionist position on war as an example. Furthermore, trade unionist Arthur Horner claimed in 1960 that, in retrospect, certain party members sympathized with de-prioritizing class conflict.

=== Venezuela ===
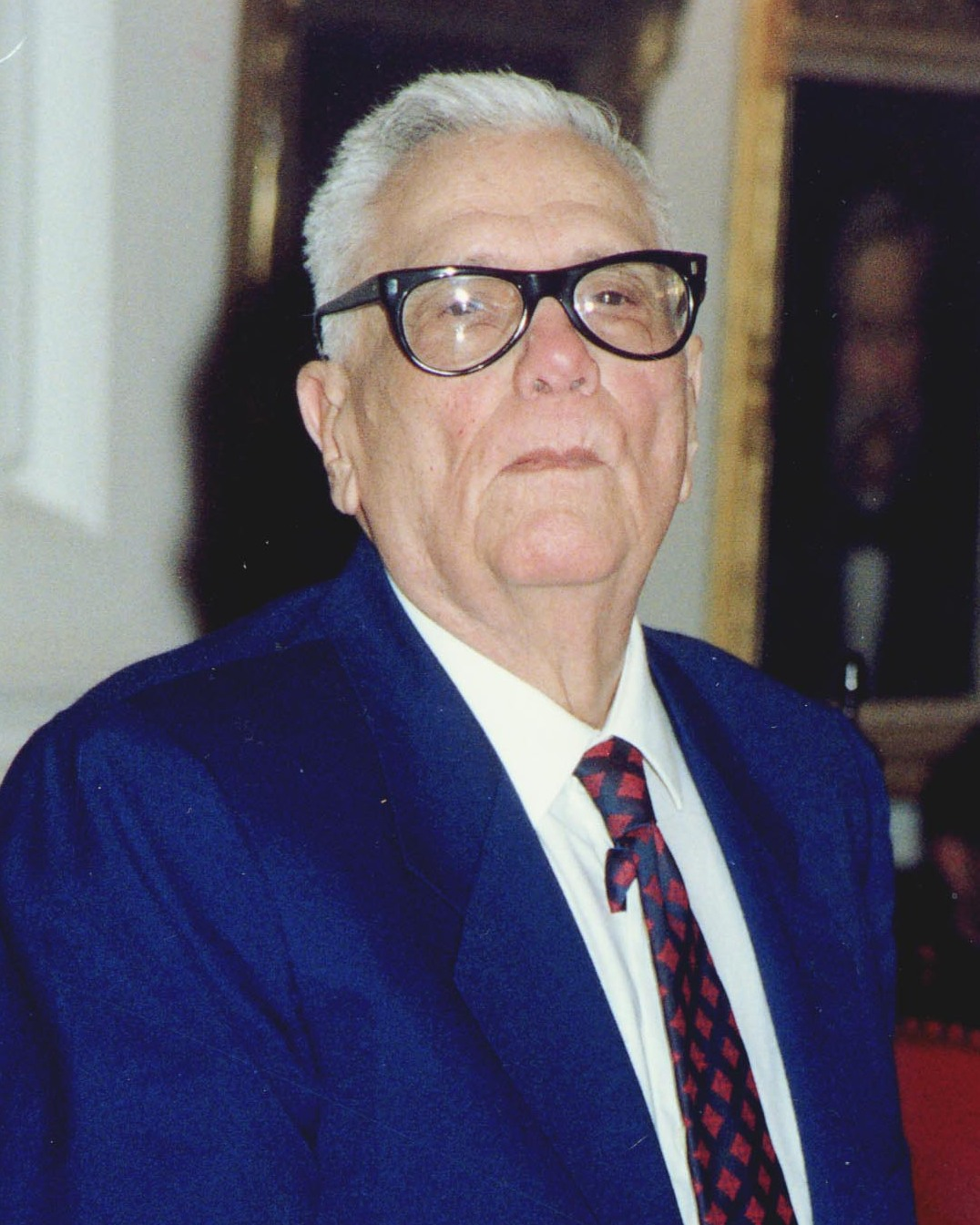
Juan Bautista Fuenmayor (pictured in 1991) led the PCV from 1937 to 1946.

According to Steve Ellner, Juan Bautista Fuenmayor—elected general secretary of the Communist Party of Venezuela (PCV) at the 1st National Conference in August 1937—pursued a similar position to the CPUSA's liquidation into the CPA. In 1945, his pamphlet The Role of the Working Class and Communists in the Current Era argued for a "party of a new type" to form, uniting progressives around the then-clandestine party. Fuenmayor justified this course of action by alluding to "demagogic organizations" opportunistically appealing to the socialist identity themselves; this likely referred to Democratic Action, whose reformist politics Fuenmayor sought to confront during his tenure.

While publishing the Colombian and Cuban censures of the Duclos letter in ¡Aquí Está!, the PCV debated whether they should likewise publicly denounce it, with concerns that Browder was hindered in adequately responding against Duclos' charges. During the Communist Unity Congress, dissidents from the United Venezuelan Communist Party (PCVU) attacked the party's close association with Browderist policies, including Pompeyo Márquez. Rodolfo Quintero opposed the re-entry of former Browderists from the former PCV leadership, declaring that "[w]e have been fed the excrement of Browderism from Cuba."

== Criticism ==
Unlike other variants of Marxism–Leninism like Maoism and Hoxhaism, Browderism has not retained relevance within American communist politics, and its international influence was predominantly confined to the 1940s. It has, in retrospect, been criticized by anti-revisionists, a position within Marxism–Leninism which remains ideologically committed to Stalinism. Anti-revisionists argued that Browderism was indicative of American exceptionalism, insinuating that the circumstances of class conflict didn't apply to the U.S. Furthermore, they argued that the broad popular front Browderism envisioned subordinated the CPUSA to the interests of the bourgeoisie via the Democratic Party, and that the threat of fascism used as justification was non-existent. During the Sino-Soviet split, the editorial departments of the People's Daily and Red Flag claimed the revisionism of Nikita Khrushchev can be traced back to Browderism, even calling Khrushchev "a disciple of Browder".

Within the CPUSA, John Gates attacked the ideology along with Titoism and Trotskyism in a 1951 pamphlet, declaring it to be "a valuable instrument in the hands of U.S. imperialism in its plans for world war and counter-revolution." Claudia Jones was critical of the Browderist political line on race relations as "strengthening [...] bourgeois nationalism among the Negro people and [...] undue reliance on the Negro reformist leadership." In a 2020 article, the CPUSA criticized Browderism as "opportunistic", accusing it of confusing and abandoning the party's principles and constituencies.

== See also ==
- American Left
- Anti-Americanism
- Anti-Stalinist left
- Communism in Colombia
- Communism in Cuba
- Deviationism
- Eurocommunism
- Far-left politics in the United Kingdom
- Fifth Party System
- Fraternal party
- Liquidationism
- Lovestoneites
- Joe Sims (politician)
- National communism
- Political opportunism
- Socialist patriotism
- Titoism
