= Lázaro Peña =

Cuban labor leader (1911–1974)

- Peña in 1944
- Born: Lázaro Peña González; 1911; Havana, Cuba
- Died: 11 March 1974 (aged 62–63); Cuba
- Occupation: Trade unionist

Lázaro Peña González (1911 – 11 March 1974) was a Cuban labor leader and trade unionist. He was an active member of the Communist Party of Cuba (PCC) and faced retaliation and arrest for his labor organizing and political activity prior to the Cuban Revolution.

== Biography ==
Lázaro Peña was born in 1911 in Los Sitios, a neighborhood in Havana, Cuba. His father never finished school and took on different jobs as a carpenter and on a tobacco farm, stripping leaves from tobacco plants. Peña also started working at a young age.

He joined the Communist Party of Cuba (PCC) when he was 18 years old and was elected to the Central Committee of the party several years later. In 1934, he was elected general secretary of the Tobacco Workers' Union.

As a member of the National Confederation of Cuban Workers (CNOC), Peña participated in the August 1933 strike, while led to the downfall of the Machado dictatorship. In March 1935, he joined another strike; this time, strikers faced violent reprisal from the government and Fulgencio Batista, who was head of the army at that time. Peña was arrested and tortured. He was released from prison in August 1936.

Peña continued to organize the Cuban labor movement and criticized US policies and involvement in Latin America. In the 1940s, he served as secretary general of the Confederation of Cuban Workers. He was arrested in July 1952 amidst government crackdowns and then in September 1953 for "subversive activity". After attending the congress of the World Federation of Trade Unions (WFTU) in Vienna in 1953, he was blocked by the Batista dictatorship from returning to Cuba. He lived in exile in Mexico and was only able to return after the Cuban Revolution in 1959.

In 1965, he was elected to the Central Committee of the PCC. In 1973, he was appointed head of the Department of Mass Organizations in the PCC. He died the following year.
