= Thakin Ba Hein =

Burmese Marxist theorist (1917–1946)

- ဗဟိန်း
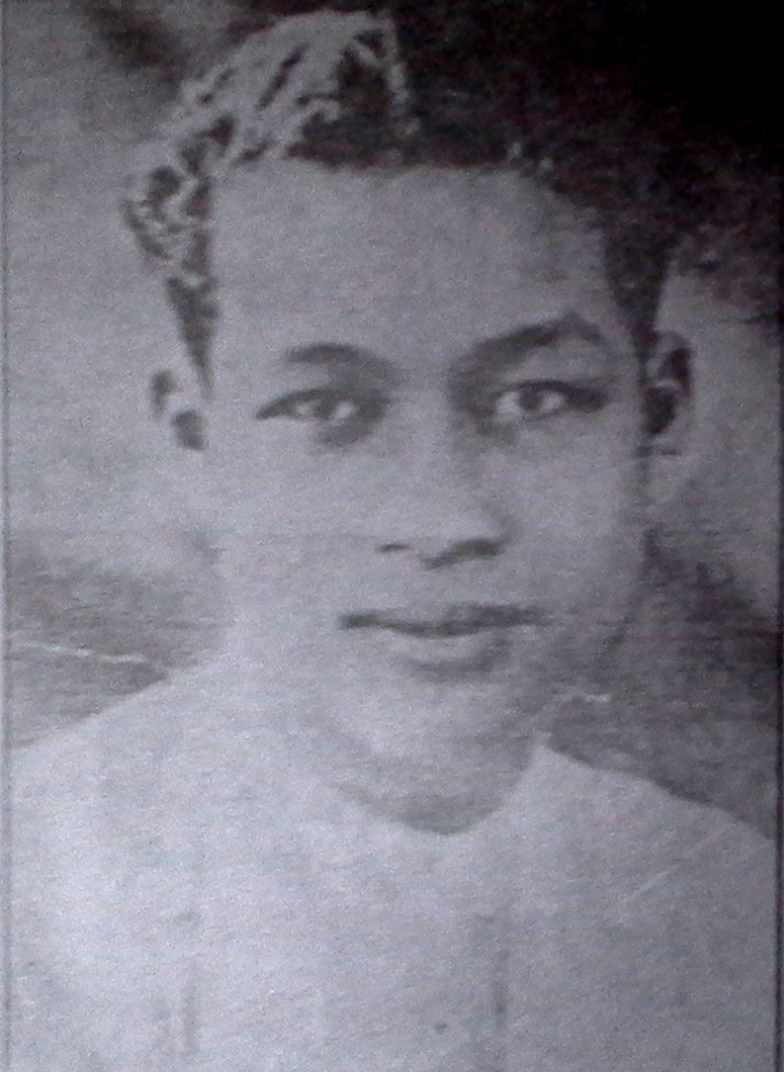

Personal details
- Born: 1917 Mandalay
- Died: 20 November 1946 (aged 28–29)
- Spouse: Daw Khin Gyi
- Occupation: Revolutionary; Politician, soldier
- Known for: Member of Dobama Asiayone One of the Founders of the Communist Party of Burma; Founder of All Burma Workers' Union (ABWU); Chairperson of The All Burma Students' Union (ABSU), and All Burma Federation of Students' Union (ABFSU); Key leader of Anti-Fascist Organisation (AFO), and Anti-Fascist People's Freedom League Leader of [[Anti-Fascist Resistance Movement

Thakin Ba Hein (June 1917 – 20 November 1946) was one of the founding members of the Communist Party of Burma, formed in 1939. He was considered the father of "true communism" in Burma by the Communist Party of Burma (CPB).

== Early life ==
Ba Hein was the second youngest son among seven child of his father U Mhin and mother Daw Oo. He was born in the city of Inwa. He completed his study from Mandalay College and University of Yangon.

== Politics ==
He played an important role in the Burma's struggle for independence. Ba Hien was the President of the All-Burma Students' Union in 1935. Ba Hien translated Marxist literature for the Nagani Book Club in Rangoon. He was a leader of the Dobama Asiayone and the leftist Freedom Bloc. He organized the oil workers in Yenengyaung. One of the first thakin to join the CPB in 1939. He was imprisoned by the British in Mandalay from 1940 to 1942. He served in the wartime government of Ba Maw. He went underground in 1945 as a resistance leader in the Toungoo area. He became member of the Central Committee at the Second Congress in 1945.

After the re-constitution of All Burma Trade Union Congress on 1 June 1945, Thakin Ba Hien became the president of the organisation. He was also an active and senior member of the Communist Party of Burma.

== Death ==
He died on 20 November 1946 at the People's Hospital of Mandalay from Malaria.
