= Thakin Soe =

Burmese Marxist-Leninist leader (1906–1989)

- စိုး
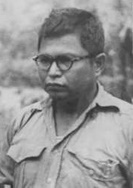
- Soe in 1952

Personal details
- Born: 1906 Moulmein, British Burma
- Died: 6 May 1989 (aged 82–83)
- Occupation: Politician, soldier
- Known for: One of the Founders of the Communist Party of Burma

Thakin Soe (Burmese: သခင်စိုး, pronounced [θəkʰiɰ̃ só]; 1906 – 6 May 1989) was a founding member of the Communist Party of Burma and a leader of the Anti-Fascist Organisation. He is regarded as one of Burma's most prominent communist leaders.

== Early life ==
Soe was an ethnic Mon and was born in Moulmein (present-day Mawlamyine). He worked for the Burmah Oil Company.

== Movement ==
=== Before independence ===
Soe joined the nationalist Dobama Asiayone ("Our Burma" Association) in 1930s. Soe together with Thakin Ba Tin and other nationalists founded the Communist Party of Burma in 1939.

Communist leaders Thakin Than Tun and Thakin Soe, and Socialist leaders Ba Swe and Kyaw Nyein and the Burma National Army (BNA) led by General Aung San founded the Anti-Fascist Organisation (AFO) in August 1944 at a secret meeting of the CPB, the PRP and the BNA in Pegu. The AFO was later renamed the Anti-Fascist People's Freedom League(AFPFL).

Thakin Than Tun and Thakin Soe, while in Insein prison in July 1941, had co-authored the Insein Manifesto which, against the prevailing opinion in the Dobama movement, identified world fascism as the main enemy in the coming war and called for temporary co-operation with the British in a broad allied coalition which should include the Soviet Union. Soe had already gone underground to organise resistance against the Japanese occupation, and Than Tun was able to pass on Japanese intelligence to Soe, while other communist leaders Thakin Thein Pe and Tin Shwe made contact with the exiled colonial government in Simla, India.

=== Post-independence ===
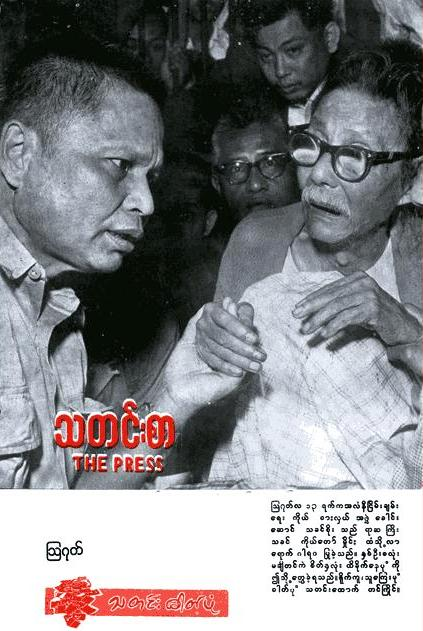
Thakin Soe with Thakin Kodaw Hmaing in September 1963.

Thakin Soe spent most of his life underground and for a time led the Red Flag Communist Party. He was captured by government forces in November 1970 near the Arakan Yoma but released in a 1980 amnesty by the socialist government. After nationwide demonstrations against Ne Win's government in 1988, Soe re-entered the politics in August 1988 and became the patron of the Unity and Peace Party in September 1988, which he hoped would contest in the 1990 elections.
