= Thakin Than Tun =

Burmese communist leader (1911–1968)

- ‌သန်းထွန်း
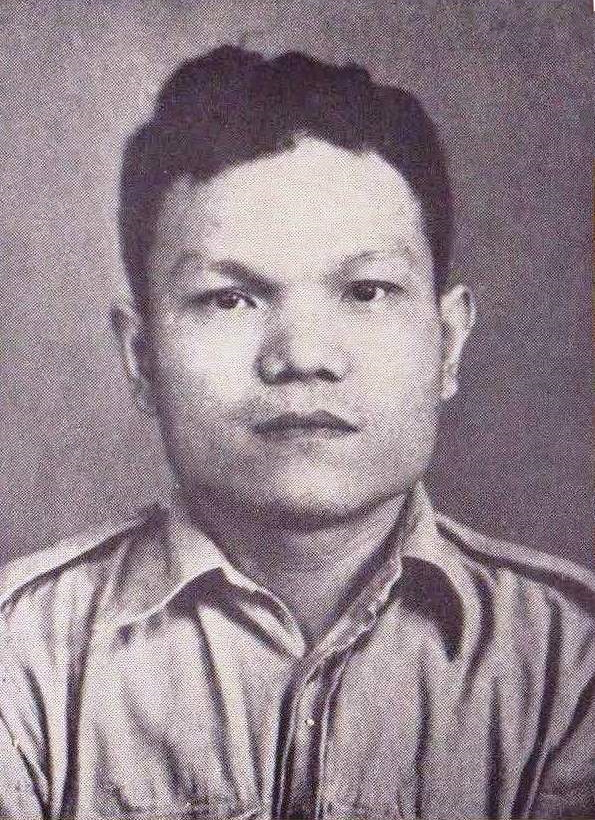

Minister of Land and Agriculture
- In office 1942–1943
- Preceded by: Position established

Personal details
- Born: 1911 Kanyutkwin, Taungoo District, British Burma
- Died: 24 September 1968 (aged 56–57) Burma
- Cause of death: Gunshot wounds
- Party: Communist Party of Burma
- Spouse: Khin Gyi
- Relations: Pho Maung (father); Aung San (brother-in-law); Aung San Suu Kyi (niece)
- Education: Teachers' Training School

Thakin Than Tun (Burmese: သခင်သန်းထွန်း; 1911 – 24 September 1968) was a Burmese politician and leader of the Communist Party of Burma (CPB) from 1945 until his assassination in 1968. He was the brother-in-law of Myanmar's independence leader Aung San and the uncle of the former State Counsellor of Myanmar Aung San Suu Kyi.

== Early life ==
Than Tun was born in 1911 in Kanyutkwin, British Burma. He married Khin Khin Gyi, the elder sister of Aung San Suu Kyi's mother Khin Kyi.

== Struggle for independence ==
Than Tun worked as a school teacher after qualifying from the Teachers' Training School, Rangoon, and was influenced by Marxist writings. He joined in 1936 the nationalist Dobama Asiayone ("Our Burma" Association) and helped forge an alliance with Dr Ba Maw's Poor Man's Party to form the Freedom Bloc. He co-founded the Nagani (Red Dragon) Book Club with Thakin Nu in 1937, which for the first time widely circulated Burmese-language translations of the Marxist classics. He was imprisoned by the British in 1940 along with Thakin Nu, Thakin Soe, Dr. Ba Maw, and Kyaw Nyein.

While in Insein prison in July 1941, he co-authored with Thakin Soe the "Insein Manifesto" which identified world fascism as the major enemy in the coming war and called for temporary cooperation with the British and the establishment of a broad coalition alliance that should include the Soviet Union. The struggle for national liberation against imperialism would be resumed after the defeat of fascism. This was against the prevailing opinion of the Dobama movement including Thakin Aung San who had secretly left Burma with a group of young men subsequently known as the Thirty Comrades in order to receive military training from the Japanese and founded the Burma Independence Army (BIA).

When Ba Maw's pro-Japanese government was established in 1942, Than Tun served as Minister of Land and Agriculture, and he met and married Khin Gyi, sister of Aung San Suu Kyi's mother Khin Kyi. Aung San married Khin Kyi about the same time shortly after he became Minister of War; the BIA was renamed the Burma Defence Army (BDA). Than Tun could pass on Japanese intelligence to Thakin Soe who had gone underground in the Delta region in order to organise resistance against the Japanese Occupation. Thakins Thein Pe and Tin Shwe were sent to India to make contact with the British colonial government in exile at Simla. At the end of World War II, after the Japanese had been defeated and the British had returned, Than Tun became general secretary of the Anti-Fascist People's Freedom League (AFPFL) formed by the CPB, the People's Revolutionary Party (PRP, later renamed the Socialist Party) and the BDA, now renamed the Burma National Army (BNA) and led by his brother-in-law Aung San. Than Tun, unlike Aung San, was not among the six men who founded the CPB on 15 August 1939; Aung San was its first secretary general, with Thakin Soe in charge of mass organisation.

== Civil war ==
When Thakin Soe's Red Flag Communist Party ("Alan Ni Party") split from the Communist Party of Burma in early 1946, accusing it of revisionism—"Browderism", named after Earl Browder, leader of the Communist Party of the United States of America—and went underground, Than Tun and the majority of Communists continued to cooperate with the AFPFL. However, the rift over strategy, whether to negotiate with the postwar colonial administration or to continue with the threat of general strikes and armed rebellion till full independence was achieved, came to a head after Aung San and others accepted seats in the Executive Council. In July 1946, Than Tun was forced to resign as general secretary, and the CPB, now dubbed the "White Flag" faction, expelled from the AFPFL the following October, after the CPB had accused Aung San and others of selling out to the British and settling for a "sham" independence.

Independence was declared on 4 January 1948, with the AFPFL, now dominated by the Socialist Party, in power, and U Nu became prime minister, now that Aung San had been assassinated along with most of his cabinet on 19 July 1947, commemorated since as Martyrs' Day. The CPB was charged with inciting revolt after organising a series of strikes and mass rallies, and orders were issued to arrest the leadership on 28 March 1948. Than Tun escaped and led his party underground in order to organize armed revolution, and established guerrilla bases in central Burma from the CPB stronghold at Pyinmana. Than Tun, now Chairman of the CPB, sent a number of party members to China to be trained by Chinese revolutionaries. Some of them returned for the peace parley of 1963 when the CPB sent a delegation to Rangoon to negotiate with the Revolutionary Council government headed by General Ne Win. Than Tun himself remained in the jungle and was reunited with the so-called "Peking returnees" after the peace talks broke down.

== Demise ==
In 1967 he carried out his own cultural revolution, purging the party of "revisionists", and as in China things went out of control before he could finally pull the reins back. Great damage nonetheless had already been done to the CPB's image, particularly the killing of young student leaders who had joined the CPB after the failed peace parley. The country had experienced this kind of treatment of its young only recently at the hands of Ne Win's army in the 7 July 1962 massacre of Rangoon University students during a peaceful protest on campus shortly after the coup d'etat of 2 March 1962. The next year, on 24 September 1968, whilst on the run from government troops, Than Tun was assassinated by a subordinate who later surrendered to General Ne Win's government. The assassin had joined the Communists just two years before as an "army deserter".

== Legacy ==
Than Tun was the only politician that nearly matched Aung San in status among his contemporaries and even the British noticed early on that he was the thinker behind Aung San. He first made his name as the schoolteacher who wrote powerful speeches in both Burmese and English. As a political organiser his skills were unequalled and he had played a pre-eminent role at every stage of Burma's struggle for independence. He was no mere ideologue but a man of extraordinary achievement and energy. Than Tun has come to be regarded as a fallen idol in the modern history of Burma.

Party political offices
Preceded by None	General Secretary of the Anti-Fascist People's Freedom League; 1945 – 1947	Succeeded by Kyaw Nyein
Preceded by Thein Pe Myint	Chairman of the Communist Party of Burma; 1952 – 1968	Succeeded by Thakin Zin
