= Voiceless alveolo-palatal fricative =

Consonantal sound represented by ⟨ɕ⟩ in IPA

ɕ
- IPA number: 182

Audio sample
- source · help

Encoding
- Entity (decimal): &#597;
- Unicode (hex): U+0255
- X-SAMPA: s\
- Braille: ⠦ (braille pattern dots-236) ⠉ (braille pattern dots-14)
Image

A voiceless alveolo-palatal sibilant fricative is a type of consonantal sound, used in some spoken languages. The symbol in the International Phonetic Alphabet that represents this sound is ⟨ɕ⟩ (⟨c⟩, plus the curl also found in its voiced counterpart ⟨ʑ⟩). Some Americanists may distinguish ⟨ɕ⟩ as an affricate, typically transcribed in IPA with ⟨t͡ɕ⟩, and instead use the symbol ⟨𝼞⟩ to represent the fricative that is referenced on this page. There is also a superscript ⟨ᶝ⟩ / ⟨𐞺⟩. It is the sibilant equivalent of the voiceless palatal fricative.

== Features ==
Sagittal section of a voiceless alveolo-palatal fricative

Features of a voiceless alveolo-palatal fricative:

- Its manner of articulation is sibilant (a subclass of fricatives and affricates), which means it is generally produced with a higher-frequency turbulence. Sibilants may be articulated with various tongue shapes and degrees of palatalization, depending on their place of articulation.
- Its place of articulation is alveolo-palatal. This means that:
  - The articulation is postalveolar and laminal, meaning that the tongue blade contacts the roof of the mouth in the area behind the alveolar ridge (the gum line). Some phoneticians instead argue that the articulation is pre-palatal and dorsal, meaning that the back of the tongue (the dorsum) is raised toward the front of the hard palate.
  - It is heavily palatalized, meaning that the middle of the tongue is bowed and raised towards the hard palate.
- Its phonation is voiceless, which means it is produced without vibrations of the vocal cords.
- It is an oral consonant, which means that air is not allowed to escape through the nose.
- It is a median consonant, which means it is produced by directing the airstream down the midline of the tongue, rather than to the sides.
- Its airstream mechanism is pulmonic, which means it is articulated by pushing air only with the intercostal muscles and abdominal muscles, as in most speech sounds.

== In English ==
In British Received Pronunciation, /j/ after syllable-initial /p, t, k/ (as in Tuesday) is realized as a devoiced palatal fricative. The amount of devoicing is variable, but the fully voiceless variant tends to be alveolo-palatal [ɕ] in the /tj/ sequence: [ˈt̺ʲɕʉːzdeɪ]. It is a fricative, rather than a fricative element of an affricate because the preceding plosive remains alveolar, rather than becoming alveolo-palatal, as in Dutch.

The corresponding affricate can be written with ⟨t̠ʲ͡ɕ⟩ or ⟨c̟͡ɕ⟩ in narrow IPA, though ⟨tɕ⟩ is normally used in both cases. In the case of English, the sequence can be specified as ⟨t̺ɕ⟩ as /t/ is normally apical (although somewhat palatalized in that sequence), whereas alveolo-palatal consonants are laminal by definition.

An increasing number of British speakers merge this sequence with the voiceless palato-alveolar affricate /tʃ/: [ˈtʃʉːzdeɪ] (see yod-coalescence), mirroring Cockney, Australian English and New Zealand English. On the other hand, there is an opposite tendency in Canadian accents that have preserved /tj/, where the sequence tends to merge with the plain /t/ instead: [ˈt̺ʰʉːzdeɪ] (see yod-dropping), mirroring General American which does not allow /j/ to follow alveolar consonants in stressed syllables.

== Occurrence ==
Language		Word	IPA	Meaning	Notes
Adyghe		щы / śy / ش‍ہ‍	[ɕɘ]	'three'	
Assamese		ব্ৰিটিছ / British	[bɹitiɕ]	'British'	
Asturian		xarda	[ˈɕäɾðɐ]	'mackerel'	May be realised as [ʃj], [ɕj], [ɕ] or [ʃ], depending on context and speaker.
Burmese		ရှ / hyạ	[ɕa̰]	'to abrade; to cut superficially'	See Burmese phonology.
Catalan	Most dialects	reixa	[ˈre(j)ɕə]	'grille'	See Catalan phonology.
Chinese	Some Hokkien dialects	心 / sim	[ɕím]	'heart'	Allophone of /s/ before /i/.
Chinese	Mandarin	西安 / Xī'ān	[ɕí.án]	'Xi'an'	Complementary distribution allophone of /ʂ/ in front of high front vowels and palatal glides. See Mandarin phonology.
Chuvash		çиçĕм / cicĕm / شيشَم	[ˈɕiɕ̬əm]	'lightning'	Contrasts with /ʂ/ and /s/. Lenis when intervocalic.
Czech		široký	[ɕɪrokiː]	'wide'	See Czech phonology
Danish		sjæl	[ˈɕeːˀl]	'soul'	See Danish phonology.
Dutch	Some speakers	sjabloon	[ɕäˈbloːn]	'template'	May be [ʃ] or [sʲ] instead. See Dutch phonology.
English	Cardiff	human	[ˈɕumːən]	'human'	Phonetic realization of /hj/. More front and more strongly fricated than RP [ç]. Broad varieties drop the /h/: [ˈjumːən]. See English phonology.
English	Conservative Received Pronunciation	tuesday	[ˈt̺ʲɕuːzdeɪ]	'Tuesday'	Allophone of /j/ after syllable-initial /t/ (which is alveolar in this sequence), may be only partially devoiced. /tj/ is often realized as an affricate [tʃ] in British English. Mute in General American: [ˈt̺ʰuːzdeɪ]. Typically transcribed with ⟨j⟩ in broad IPA. See English phonology, yod-coalescence and yod-dropping.
English	Some Canadian English	tuesday	[ˈt̺ʲɕuːzdeɪ]	'Tuesday'	Allophone of /j/ after syllable-initial /t/ (which is alveolar in this sequence), may be only partially devoiced. /tj/ is often realized as an affricate [tʃ] in British English. Mute in General American: [ˈt̺ʰuːzdeɪ]. Typically transcribed with ⟨j⟩ in broad IPA. See English phonology, yod-coalescence and yod-dropping.
English	Ghanaian	ship	[ɕip]	'ship'	Educated speakers may use [ʃ], to which this phone corresponds in other dialects.
English	Some speakers	sure	[ɕɔː]	'sure'	
Frainc-Comtou		çhoûeçhaie	[ɕuːₔˈɕɛː]	'to blow'	
Guarani	Paraguayan	che	[ɕɛ]	'I'	
Japanese		塩 / shio	[ɕi.o]	'salt'	See Japanese phonology.
Kabardian		щэ / śə / صە	[ɕɐ]	'hundred'	
Karen	Eastern Pwo	ယှး	[ɕá]	'star'	
Karen	Western Pwo	ၡၪ	[ɕà]	'star'	
Kazakh		шіркін / şırkın / شىركىن	[ɕɘ̆r̥kʰɘ́n]	'wretch'	Often transcribed as /ʃ/. See Kazakh phonology.
Korean	South	시 / si	[ɕʰi]	'poem'	Allophone of /sʰ/ before /i/ and /j/. See Korean phonology.
Kyrgyz		шайтан / shaitan / شايتان	[ɕɑ̀ɪ̯t̪ʰɑn]	'Satan'	Often transcribed as /ʃ/. See Kyrgyz phonology.
Lower Sorbian		pśijaśel	[ˈpɕijäɕɛl]	'friend'	
Luxembourgish		liicht	[liːɕt]	'light'	Allophone of /χ/ after phonologically front vowels; some speakers merge it with [ʃ]. See Luxembourgish phonology.
Marathi		शेतकरी / śetakrī	[ɕe̞t̪ːkəɾi]	'farmer'	Contrasts with /ʂ/. Allophone of /ʃ/. See Marathi phonology.
Malayalam		കുരിശ് / kuriśŭ	[kuriɕɨ]	'Cross'	See Malayalam phonology.
Norwegian	Urban East	kjekk	[ɕe̞kː]	'handsome'	Typically transcribed in IPA with ⟨ç⟩; less often realized as palatal [ç]. Younger speakers in Bergen, Stavanger and Oslo merge it with /ʂ/. See Norwegian phonology.
Polish		śruba	[ˈɕrubä]	'screw'	Contrasts with /ʂ/ and /s/. See Polish phonology.
Romani	Kalderash	ćhavo	[ɕaˈvo]	'Romani boy; son'	Realized as [t͡ʃʰ] in conservative dialects.
Romanian	Transylvanian dialects	ce	[ɕɛ]	'what'	Realized as [t͡ʃ] in standard Romanian. See Romanian phonology.
Russian		счастье / sčastje	[ˈɕːæsʲtʲjə]	'happiness'	Also represented by ⟨щ⟩. Contrasts with /ʂ/, /s/, and /sʲ/. See Russian phonology.
Sema		ashi	[à̠ɕì]	'meat'	Possible allophone of /ʃ/ before /i, e/.
Slovak	Eastern slovak dialects	seno	[ɕeno]	'hay'	Sometimes it is considered only as allophone of the phoneme /s/ before front vowels (i, e). See Slovak phonology.
Serbo-Croatian	Croatian	miš će	[mîɕ t͡ɕe̞]	'the mouse will'	Allophone of /ʃ/ before alveolo-palatal affricates. See Serbo-Croatian phonology.
Serbo-Croatian	Some speakers of Montenegrin	с́утра / śutra	[ɕût̪ra̠]	'tomorrow'	Phonemically /sj/ or, in some cases, /s/.
Swedish	Finland	sjok	[ɕuːk]	'chunk'	Allophone of /ɧ/.
Swedish	Sweden	kjol	[ɕuːl]	'skirt'	See Swedish phonology.
Tibetan	Lhasa dialect	བཞི་ / bzhi	[ɕi˨˧]	'four'	Contrasts with /ʂ/.
Tatar		өчпочмак / öçpoçmaq / ئۇچپۇچماق	[ˌø̞̆ɕpɤ̹̆ɕˈmɑq]	'triangle'	
Uzbek		yoʻldosh / йўлдош‍ / یۉلداش	[jɵlˈd̪ɒ̽ɕ]	'satellite'	Typically transcribed as /ʃ/. See Uzbek phonology.
Xumi	Lower	[d͡ʑi ɕɐ˦]		'one hundred'	
Xumi	Upper	[d͡ʑi ɕɐ˦]		'one hundred'	
Yámana (Yahgan)		šúša	[ɕúɕa]	'penguin'	
Yi		ꑟ / xi	[ɕi˧]	'thread'	
Zhuang		cib	[ɕǐp]	'ten'	

== See also ==
- Index of phonetics articles
- Voiceless palato-alveolar sibilant

== Sources ==
- Boretzky, Nobert; Igla, Birgit (1994), Wörterbuch Romani-Deutsch-Englisch für den südosteuropäischen Raum: mit einer Grammatik der Dialektvarianten, Wiesbaden, DE: Harrassowitz Verlag, ISBN 3-447-03459-9
- Chirkova, Katia; Chen, Yiya (2013), "Xumi, Part 1: Lower Xumi, the variety of the lower and middle reaches of the Shuiluo River" (PDF), Journal of the International Phonetic Association, 43 (3): 363–379, doi:10.1017/S0025100313000157
- Chirkova, Katia; Chen, Yiya; Kocjančič Antolík, Tanja (2013), "Xumi, Part 2: Upper Xumi, the variety of the upper reaches of the Shuiluo River" (PDF), Journal of the International Phonetic Association, 43 (3): 381–396, doi:10.1017/S0025100313000169
- Collins, Beverley; Mees, Inger M. (1990), "The phonetics of Cardiff English", in Coupland, Nikolas; Thomas, Alan Richard (eds.), English in Wales: Diversity, conflict, and change, Multilingual Matters Ltd., pp. 87–103, ISBN 1-85359-032-0
- Collins, Beverley; Mees, Inger M. (2003) [1981], The Phonetics of English and Dutch (5th ed.), Leiden, NL: Brill Publishers, ISBN 9004103406
- Cruz-Ferreira, Madalena (1995), "European Portuguese", Journal of the International Phonetic Association, 25 (2): 90–94, doi:10.1017/S0025100300005223, S2CID 249414876
- Esling, John (2010), "Phonetic notation", in Hardcastle, William J.; Laver, John; Gibbon, Fiona E. (eds.), The Handbook of Phonetic Sciences (2nd ed.), John Wiley & Sons, ISBN 9781405145909
- Gilles, Peter; Trouvain, Jürgen (2013), "Luxembourgish", Journal of the International Phonetic Association, 43 (1): 67–74, doi:10.1017/S0025100312000278
- Huber, Magnus (2004), "Ghanaian English: phonology", in Schneider, Edgar W.; Burridge, Kate; Kortmann, Bernd; Mesthrie, Rajend; Upton, Clive (eds.), A handbook of varieties of English, vol. 1: Phonology, Mouton de Gruyter, pp. 842–865, ISBN 3-11-017532-0
- Jassem, Wiktor (2003), "Polish", Journal of the International Phonetic Association, 33 (1): 103–107, doi:10.1017/S0025100303001191
- Kristoffersen, Gjert (2000), The Phonology of Norwegian, Oxford University Press, ISBN 978-0-19-823765-5
- Landau, Ernestina; Lončarić, Mijo; Horga, Damir; Škarić, Ivo (1999), "Croatian", Handbook of the International Phonetic Association: A guide to the use of the International Phonetic Alphabet, Cambridge, UK: Cambridge University Press, pp. 66–69, ISBN 0-521-65236-7
- Okada, Hideo (1999), "Japanese", in International Phonetic Association (ed.), Handbook of the International Phonetic Association: A Guide to the Use of the International Phonetic Alphabet, Cambridge University Press, pp. 117–119, ISBN 978-0-52163751-0
- Pop, Sever (1938), Micul Atlas Linguistic Român, Muzeul Limbii Române Cluj
- Recasens, Daniel; Espinosa, Aina (2007), "An electropalatographic and acoustic study of affricates and fricatives in two Catalan dialects" (PDF), Journal of the International Phonetic Association, 37 (2): 143–172, doi:10.1017/S0025100306002829, S2CID 14275190, archived from the original (PDF) on 2020-11-22
- Sjoberg, Andrée F. (1963), Uzbek Structural Grammar, Uralic and Altaic Series, vol. 18, Bloomington, IN: Indiana University
- Teo, Amos B. (2012), "Sumi (Sema)", Journal of the International Phonetic Association, 42 (3): 365–373, doi:10.1017/S0025100312000254
- Zygis, Marzena (2003), "Phonetic and phonological aspects of Slavic sibilant fricatives" (PDF), ZAS Papers in Linguistics, 3: 175–213, doi:10.21248/zaspil.32.2003.191

Place →	Labial					Coronal										Dorsal					Laryngeal			
Manner ↓	Bilabial		Labiodental		Linguolabial		Dental		Alveolar		Postalveolar		Retroflex		(Alveolo-)palatal		Velar		Uvular		Pharyngeal/epiglottal		Glottal	
Nasal	m̥	m	ɱ̊	ɱ		n̼	n̪̊	n̪	n̥	n	n̠̊	n̠	ɳ̊	ɳ	ɲ̊	ɲ	ŋ̊	ŋ	ɴ̥	ɴ				
Plosive	p	b	p̪	b̪	t̼	d̼	t̪	d̪	t	d			ʈ	ɖ	c	ɟ	k	ɡ	q	ɢ	ʡ		ʔ	
Sibilant affricate							t̪s̪	d̪z̪	ts	dz	t̠ʃ	d̠ʒ	tʂ	dʐ	tɕ	dʑ								
Non-sibilant affricate	pɸ	bβ	p̪f	b̪v			t̪θ	d̪ð	tɹ̝̊	dɹ̝	t̠ɹ̠̊˔	d̠ɹ̠˔			cç	ɟʝ	kx	ɡɣ	qχ	ɢʁ	ʡʜ	ʡʢ	ʔh	
Sibilant fricative							s̪	z̪	s	z	ʃ	ʒ	ʂ	ʐ	ɕ	ʑ								
Non-sibilant fricative	ɸ	β	f	v	θ̼	ð̼	θ	ð	θ̠	ð̠	ɹ̠̊˔	ɹ̠˔	ɻ̊˔	ɻ˔	ç	ʝ	x	ɣ	χ	ʁ	ħ	ʕ	h	ɦ
Approximant		β̞		ʋ				ð̞		ɹ		ɹ̠		ɻ		j		ɰ						˷
Tap/flap		ⱱ̟		ⱱ					ɾ̥	ɾ			ɽ̊	ɽ						ɢ̆		ʡ̆		
Trill	ʙ̥	ʙ							r̥	r		r̠	ɽ̊r̥	ɽr					ʀ̥	ʀ	ʜ	ʢ		
Lateral affricate									tɬ	dɮ			tꞎ	d𝼅	c𝼆	ɟʎ̝	k𝼄	ɡʟ̝						
Lateral fricative							ɬ̪		ɬ	ɮ			ꞎ	𝼅	𝼆	ʎ̝	𝼄	ʟ̝						
Lateral approximant								l̪	l̥	l		l̠	ɭ̊	ɭ	ʎ̥	ʎ	ʟ̥	ʟ		ʟ̠				
Lateral tap/flap									ɺ̥	ɺ			𝼈̊	𝼈		ʎ̆		ʟ̆						

		BL	LD	D	A	PA	RF	P	V	U
Implosive	Voiced	ɓ			ɗ		ᶑ	ʄ	ɠ	ʛ
Implosive	Voiceless	ɓ̥			ɗ̥		ᶑ̊	ʄ̊	ɠ̊	ʛ̥
Ejective	Stop	pʼ			tʼ		ʈʼ	cʼ	kʼ	qʼ
Ejective	Affricate		p̪fʼ	tθʼ	tsʼ	tʃʼ	tʂʼ	tɕʼ	kxʼ	qχʼ
Ejective	Fricative	ɸʼ	fʼ	θʼ	sʼ	ʃʼ	ʂʼ	ɕʼ	xʼ	χʼ
Ejective	Lateral affricate				tɬʼ			c𝼆ʼ	k𝼄ʼ	q𝼄ʼ
Ejective	Lateral fricative				ɬʼ					
Click (top: velar; bottom: uvular)	Tenuis	kʘ qʘ		kǀ qǀ	kǃ qǃ		k𝼊 q𝼊	kǂ qǂ		
Click (top: velar; bottom: uvular)	Voiced	ɡʘ ɢʘ		ɡǀ ɢǀ	ɡǃ ɢǃ		ɡ𝼊 ɢ𝼊	ɡǂ ɢǂ		
Click (top: velar; bottom: uvular)	Nasal	ŋʘ ɴʘ		ŋǀ ɴǀ	ŋǃ ɴǃ		ŋ𝼊 ɴ𝼊	ŋǂ ɴǂ	ʞ	
Click (top: velar; bottom: uvular)	Tenuis lateral				kǁ qǁ					
Click (top: velar; bottom: uvular)	Voiced lateral				ɡǁ ɢǁ					
Click (top: velar; bottom: uvular)	Nasal lateral				ŋǁ ɴǁ					
