= Kaba Ma Kyei =

National anthem of Myanmar

ပြည်ထောင်စုသမ္မတမြန်မာနိုင်ငံတော် နိုင်ငံတော်သီချင်း
English: National Anthem of the Republic of the Union of Myanmar
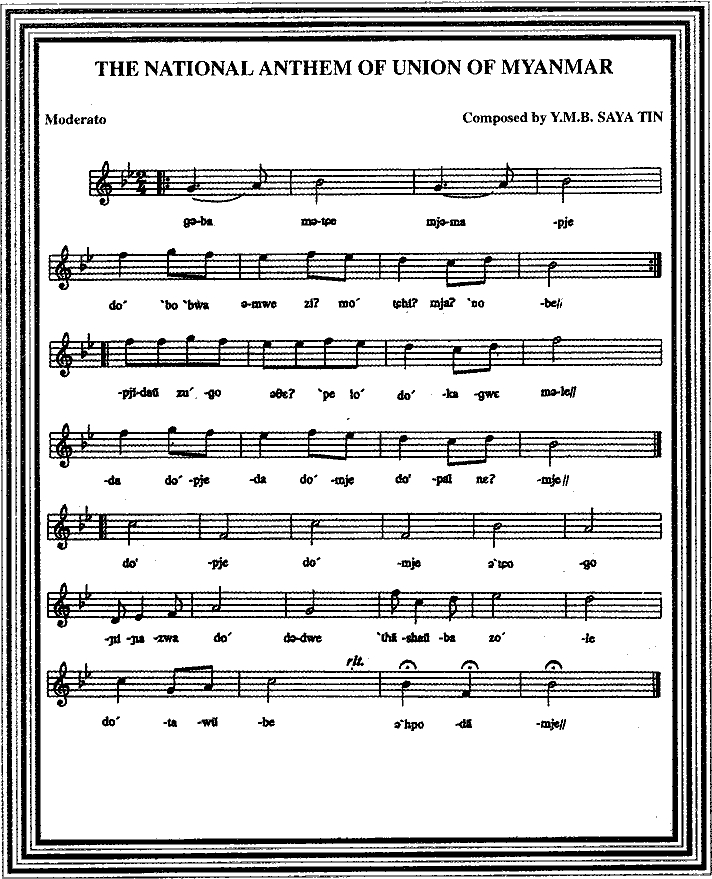
- A music sheet for second verse
- National anthem of Myanmar
- Lyrics: YMB Saya Tin and Thakins (Note: Including Thakin Ba Thaung, Thakin Thein Maung, Thakin Hla Baw, Thakin Tha Do, Thakin On Pe, Thakin Kyaw Tun Sein and Thakin Po Ni) (1930); U Sein Mya Maung (1947)
- Music: YMB Saya Tin, 1930
- Published: 1930 (as “Dobama Song”); 1947 (as “National Anthem”)
- Adopted: 27 June 1936 (by the second conference of Dobama Asiayon); 1 August 1943 (by the State of Burma); 22 September 1947 (by the Constituent Assembly of the Union of Burma)

Audio sample
- Instrumental rendition of the second verse by the U.S. Navy Band: file; help

The national anthem (Note: Burmese: နိုင်ငံတော်သီချင်း, MLCTS: Nuingngamtausihkyang:; Burmese pronunciation: [nàɪɴŋàɴtɔ̀θìtɕʰɪ́ɴ]; lit. 'State Song') of Myanmar consists of two parts; the first half is a traditional Burmese style section, before transitioning into the second half, a Western-style orchestra. Because of the second half, both the "State Song" and its predecessor "Dobama Song" are popularly known as "Kaba Ma Kyei" (Burmese: ကမ္ဘာမကျေ [gəbà mə tɕè]; lit. 'Till the End of the World').

Schools start with the students saluting to the State Flag and the Martyrs, followed by singing the National Anthem and saluting the Anthem. At offices, this procedure is done at a designated time in the afternoon. A long-standing tradition is that those who sing the national anthem bow to salute at the end, as a show of respect for the nation. At schools, offices and formal gatherings, the command "နေမြဲ" (As you were!) is shouted to conclude the salute.

== History ==
Pre-colonial Burma did not have a proper national anthem, but had compositions glorifying the king, which served as royal anthems. After the annexation of Burma by the British Raj in 1886, "God Save the King" became the national anthem of British Burma.

In 1930, a musician from Mandalay named Saya Tin went to Yangon and contacted the Thakins to write a new national anthem together. They set four criteria for the anthem: it must include the background of Burmese history; the current situation of Burma with regrets, lessons, and then encouraging words; it must agitate Burmese habits to build a new age; and the anthem must agitate national pride of any Burmese who listens to it. For these criteria to be met, many Thakins including Thakin Ba Thaung, Thakin Thein Maung, Thakin Hla Baw, Thakin Tha Do, Thakin On Pe, Thakin Kyaw Tun Sein, and Thakin Po Ni helped find words, and YMB Saya Tin wrote the lyrics originally titled "Dobama Song" (တို့ဗမာသီချင်း [do̰ bəmà θətʃʰɪ́ɴ]; lit. 'We Burmans Song'). Besides being the leader of the Thakins, Thakin Ba Thaung was working as a teacher of translation at Rangoon University. He had a discussion with U Tun Sein, a tutor of mathematics; U Nyunt, a tutor of Burmese; and Ko Nu, a student. On 19 July 1930, the Dobama Song was sung for the first time in a reading room of Thaton Hostel. Written in Burmese and English, it was published in the University Magazine. On 20 July 1930, it was sung with a ceremony with a huge public crowd inside U San Tun Hall at the Rahu corner of Shwedagon Pagoda. After that the Dobama Asiayone received a lot of invitations to come and sing the song. The Thakins tried to establish a tradition of singing Dobama Song in every meeting and ceremony.

On 27 June 1936, the Dobama Song was declared as the national anthem of Burma at the second conference of Dobama Asiayon held in Myingyan. Since then, Burmese nationalists sang the Dobama Song instead of God Save the King.

The State of Burma, a Japanese puppet state, officially adopted the Dobama Song as its state anthem in 1943.

In the lead up to Burma's independence, U Nu asked U Sein Mya Maung to write a national anthem for their soon-to-be independent country. U Sein Mya Maung used the Dobama Song as a template, keeping the song's melody but slightly modifying the lyrics. The National Anthem was adopted as Burma's national anthem on 22 September 1947.

On 18 June 1989, the State Law and Order Restoration Council (the ruling military junta at the time) ordered to change the word "Burma" (ဗမာ Băma) to "Myanmar" (မြန်မာ Myănma) in the lyrics of the national anthem, insisting that the former refers only to the Bamar people, while the latter represents all peoples regardless of ethnicity. Both words refer to either "Burma" (the country Myanmar) or "Burman" (the Bamar people). In fact, the Burmese word Băma is derived from Myănma through vowel reduction in the first syllable then later dissimilation of initial /m/.

According to the 2008 Constitution of Myanmar, the complete version of the national anthem is specified as consisting of both the traditional Burmese style and Western-style sections.

== Official lyrics ==
=== Current text since 1989 ===
Burmese script

တရားမျှတ လွတ်လပ်ခြင်းနဲ့ မသွေ၊
တို့ပြည်၊ တို့မြေ၊
များလူခပ်သိမ်း၊ ငြိမ်းချမ်းစေဖို့၊
ခွင့်တူညီမျှ၊ ဝါဒဖြူစင်တဲ့ပြည်၊
တို့ပြည်၊ တို့မြေ၊
ပြည်ထောင်စုအမွေ၊ အမြဲတည်တံ့စေ၊
အဓိဋ္ဌာန်ပြုပေ၊ ထိန်းသိမ်းစို့လေ။

𝄆 ကမ္ဘာမကျေ၊ မြန်မာပြည်၊ (Note: Changed words are bolded)
တို့ဘိုးဘွား အမွေစစ်မို့ ချစ်မြတ်နိုးပေ။ 𝄇
ပြည်ထောင်စုကို အသက်ပေးလို့ တို့ကာကွယ်မလေ၊
ဒါတို့ပြည် ဒါတို့မြေ တို့ပိုင်နက်မြေ။
တို့ပြည် တို့မြေ အကျိုးကို ညီညာစွာတို့တစ်တွေ
ထမ်းဆောင်ပါစို့လေ တို့တာဝန်ပေ အဖိုးတန်မြေ။

Romanization of Burmese

Tăyā hmyạtạ lutlap hkyīng nẹ mă thwei,
Dọ pyei, dọ myei.
Myā lu hkapthēim nyēimgyām zei bọ,
Khwịng tunyi hmyạ wadạ hpyusing dẹi pyei.
Dọ pyei, dọ myei.
Pyidaungzụ ămwei ămyē tidạm zei
Ădeithtan pyụ bei, htēinthēim zọ lei.

𝄆 Găba mă kyei, Myănma pyei,
Dọ bōbwā ămwei sit mọ hkyit myat nō bei. 𝄇
Pyidaungzụ go ăthek pēi lọ dọ ka gwe mălei,
Da dọ pyei da dọ myei dọ paingnek myei,
Dọ pyei, dọ myei, ăkyō go, nyinya zwa dọ dădwei,
Htām hsaung ba zọ lei, dọ tawun bei ăhpōtan myei!

MLC Transcription System

Ta.ra: hmya. ta. lwat lap hkrang: nai. ma. swe /
Tui. prany / tui. mre //
Mya: lu hkap sim: ngrim: hkyam: ce hpo. /
Hkwang. tu nyi hmya. wada. hpyu cang tai. prany //
Tui. prany / tui. mre //
Prany htaung cu. a mwi a.mrai: tany tam. ce
A.dhithtan pru. pe / htin: sim: cui. le //

𝄆 Kambha ma. kye / Mranma prany /
Tui. bhui: bwa: a.mwe cac mui. hkyac mrat nui: pe // 𝄇
Prany htaung cu. kui a.sak pe: lui. tui. ka kwai ma.le /
Da tui. prany da tui. mre tui. puing nak mre //
Tui. prany / tui. mre / a.kyui: kui / nyi nya cwa tui. ta.twe /
Htam: hcaung pa sui. le / tui. ta wan pe a. hpui: tan mre //

IPA transcription as sung (Note: See Help:IPA/Burmese and Burmese phonology.)

[tə.já m̥ja̰.ta̰ lʊʔ.laʔ cʰɪ́ɴ nɛ̰ mə θwè |]
[do̰ pjè | do̰ mjè ǁ]
[mjá lù kʰaʔ.θéɪɴ ɲéɪɴ.ɟán zè bo̰ |]
[kʰwɪ̰ɴ tù.ɲì m̥ja̰ | wà.da̰ (|) pʰjù.sɪ̀ɴ dḛ pjè |]
[do̰ pjè | do̰ mjè ǁ]
[pjì.dàʊɴ.zṵ ʔə.mwè ʔə.mjɛ́ tì.da̰ɴ zè]
[ʔə.deɪʔ.tʰàɴ pjṵ bè | tʰéɪɴ.θéɪɴ zo̰ lè ǁ]

𝄆 [ɡə.bà mə cè | mjəɴ.mà pjè |]
[do̰ bó.bwá ʔə.mwè sɪʔ mo̰ cʰɪʔ mjaʔ nó bè ǁ] 𝄇
[pjì.dàʊɴ.zṵ ɡò ʔə.θɛʔ pé lo̰ do̰ kà ɡwɛ̀ mə.lè |]
[dà do̰ pjè dà do̰ mjè do̰ pàɪɴ.nɛʔ mjè |]
[do̰ pjè | do̰ mjè | ʔə.có ɡò | ɲì.ɲà zwà do̰ də.dwè |]
[tʰáɴ sʰàʊɴ bà zo̰ lè | do̰ tà.wʊ̀ɴ bè ʔə.pʰó.tàn mjè ǁ]

Official English translation

Accompanied with justice and freedom;
our nation, our motherland.
To bring peace to all people;
the nation having equal right and pure policy,
our nation, our motherland.
Let us preserve with vow
for perpetuity of our heritage of the Union.

𝄆 As long as the world exists, we love Myanmar,
the true heritage of our ancestors. 𝄇
We shall safeguard the Union by sacrificing our lives.
This is our nation, our motherland and our own land.
Let us serve unitedly for the interest of our nation, our motherland.
That is our duty for the precious land.

Literal English translation

Where justice and independence prevail,
Our country, our homeland.
Where equal rights and fair policies prevail;
For all people to live in peace,
Our country, our homeland.
Let us preserve earnestly
The Union's heritage for perpetuity.

𝄆 Till the end of the world, long live Myanmar,
We love our forefathers for they are our true heritage. 𝄇
We will sacrifice our lives to protect our country,
This is our nation, our homeland and she belongs to us.
Let us serve in unison our nation for her prosperity,
That is our duty for our precious land.

=== First draft (1947) ===
Burmese script

အမျိုးသားရေး ကြိုးပမ်းစို့လေ၊
ဒို့ပြေ ဒို့မြေ၊
အရှေ့က နေဝန်းထွန်းသစ်စပုံသို့
ဒို့ဆောင်သမျှအောင်ရမည်မှာ မလွဲပေ။
ဒို့ပြေ-ဟေ့ဒိုမြေ၊
ဒို့ပြည်ထောင်စုပေ၊ ဒို့တတွေ ရဲ့ပြေ၊
ဒို့တတွေရဲ့မြေ၊ တိုင်းရင်းသားအမွေ။

𝄆 ကမ္ဘာမကြေ၊ ဗမာပြည်၊
တို့ဘိုးဘွား အမွေစစ်မို့ ချစ်မြတ်နိုးပေ။ 𝄇
ဒါဒို့ပြေ ဒါဒို့မြေ ဒို့ကိုယ်ပိုင်မြေ၊
ဒို့ဘိုးဘွားအမွေစစ်မို့ ချစ်မြတ်နိုးပေ၊
ဒို့ပြေဒို့မြေ အကျိုးကို ကာကွယ် သယ်ပိုးမလေ၊
ဒို့ပြည်ထောင်စုအမွေ အဖိုးတန် ဤမြေ ဒို့တာဝန်ပေ။

BGN/PCGN romanization of Burmese

Amyothaye kyobanzole,
Dobye domye,
Azhega newandunthitsabôntho
Dozaungthamyha-aungyamihma malwèpe.
Dobye-hedomye,
Dobyidaungzube, Dodadwe yèpye,
Dodadweyèmye, taingyintha-amwe.

𝄆 Kambamagye, bamabyi,
Tobobwa amwezitmo chitmyatnobe. 𝄇
Dadobye dadomye dogoypaingmye,
Dobobwa-amwezitmo chitmyatnobe,
Dobyedomye agyogo kagwè thèpomale,
Dobyidaungzu-amwe abodan imye dodawanbe.

=== Final draft (1948–1989) ===
Burmese script

တရားမျှတ လွတ်လပ်ခြင်းနဲ့ မသွေ၊
တို့ပြည်၊ တို့မြေ၊
များလူခပ်သိမ်း၊ ငြိမ်းချမ်းစေဖို့၊
ခွင့်တူညီမျှ၊ ဝါဒဖြူစင်တဲ့ပြည်၊
တို့ပြည်၊ တို့မြေ၊
ပြည်ထောင်စုအမွေ၊ အမြဲတည်တံ့စေ၊
အဓိဋ္ဌာန်ပြုပေ၊ ထိန်းသိမ်းစို့လေ။

𝄆 ကမ္ဘာမကြေ၊ ဗမာပြည်၊ (Note: Bolded words were changed in 1989.)
တို့ဘိုးဘွား အမွေစစ်မို့ ချစ်မြတ်နိုးပေ။ 𝄇
ပြည်ထောင်စုကို အသက်ပေးလို့ တို့ကာကွယ်မလေ၊
ဒါတို့ပြည် ဒါတို့မြေ တို့ပိုင်နက်မြေ။
တို့ပြည် တို့မြေ အကျိုးကို ညီညာစွာတို့တတွေ
ထမ်းဆောင်ပါစို့လေ တို့တာဝန်ပေ အဖိုးတန်မြေ။

BGN/PCGN romanization of Burmese

Tayamyhada lutlatchinnè mathwe,
Tobyi, tomye,
Myalugatthein, ngyein-gyanzebo,
Kwangadunyimyha, wadabyuzindèpyi,
Tobyi, tomye,
Pyidaungzu-amwe, amyètidanze,
Adittanbyube, teintheinzole.

𝄆 Kambamagye, bamabyi,
Tobobwa amwezitmo chitmyatnobe. 𝄇
Pyidaungzugo athetpelo togagwèmale,
Dadobyi dadomye tobaingnetmye.
Tobyi tomye agyogo nyinyazwadodadwe
Tanzaungbazole todawanbe abodanmye.

== Lyrics to "Dobama Song" ==
=== Original version (1930) ===
တကောင်းအဘိရာဇာ၊ တို့ဗမာ သာကီမျိုးဟာမို့ မညှိုး ဂုဏ်တေဇာ၊
ယိုးဒယားနှင့် ကုလား (Note: derogatory terms for Thai, Europeans and Indians, later replaced by the general term for nations)ကိုပါ၊ တိုက်ခိုက်ကာ အောင်ခဲ့တာ တို့ဗမာ၊
စိန်မှန်ကင်းအစစ်၊ အဖြစ်ကြီးဖြစ်လျက်၊ ထင်းတလှည့် ကြုံရ၊
ထုံးနှင့်မသွေ၊ လောကဓမ္မတာပေ၊ ငါတို့ ကံခေ ဖြစ်ရပြန်သလေ၊
သို့သော် အရင်းကိုစစ်လျှင် ဗမာပြည် ငါတို့ ငါတို့ပြေ။
နောင်ဥဒါန်း ဘယ်မကြေစရာ၊ ရာဇဝင်တင်ထား မျိုးရိုးနွယ်လာ၊
ကမ္ဘာတခွင်မှာဖြင့် ဗမာအထင်အရှား တို့ခေတ်တွင်မှ ညံ့ကြတော့မှာလား
တို့ဗမာ၊ တို့ဗမာ မဟုတ်လေသလား
𝄆 တို့ဗမာ ငါတို့ဗမာ 𝄇 𝄆 ဒါ ငါတို့ဗမာ 𝄇
အားလုံး ညီညီ ယောက်ျားဘသား တို့ဗမာ
နောင်လာနောက်သား ကောင်းစားဖို့ရာ
တို့ကိုယ်ကျိုး လုံးလုံးမပါ၊
ရဲရဲဗမာပီပီ ဗမာပြေ တို့ဗမာဖို့ပါ၊
သခင်ကျင့်ကို ကျင့်ကြပါ၊ သခင်မျိုးဟေ့ တို့ဗမာ၊
မိုးအောက်မြေပြင်မှာ အထက်တန်းစိတ်နဲ့ စာမရီသွေး တို့ဗမာ။

𝄆 ကမ္ဘာမကြေ ဗမာတွေ ဒါတို့ပြေ ဒါတို့မြေ ဒါငါတို့ပြေ 𝄇
𝄆 ဒါတို့ပြေ ဒါတို့မြေ ဒါငါတို့ပြေ 𝄇
𝄆 တို့ဗမာ 𝄇 ပြေကို တိုင်းရင်းသား အကုန်အစင်၊
တို့ပြေလို့ မှတ်ထင်၊
တို့ဝတ္တရားပင် တို့ဗမာသခင်။

အမျိုးသားရေး ကြိုးပမ်းကြပါ တို့ဗမာ ဟေ့ တို့ဗမာ၊
ဪ အမျိုးသားရေး ကြိုးပမ်းကြပါ၊ တို့ဗမာ ဟေ့ တို့ဗမာ၊
အရှေ့ကနေဝန်း ထွက်သည့်ပမာပ၊
တို့ခေတ်ကိုတော့ ရောက်ရမည်မှာ မလွဲပါ၊ တို့ဗမာ ဟေ့တို့ဗမာ၊
ဗမာပြည်တဝှမ်း အကုန်၊ တို့အိမ်မှတ်ပါ၊ တို့ယာမှတ်ပါ၊ အဲဒါ တို့ဗမာ။

𝄆 ကမ္ဘာမကြေ ဗမာတွေ ဒါတို့ပြေ ဒါတို့မြေ ဒါငါတို့ပြေ 𝄇
𝄆 ဒါတို့ပြေ ဒါတို့မြေ ဒါငါတို့ပြေ 𝄇
𝄆 တို့ဗမာ 𝄇 ပြေကို တိုင်းရင်းသား အကုန်အစင်၊
တို့ပြေလို့ မှတ်ထင်၊
တို့ဝတ္တရားပင် တို့ဗမာသခင်။

=== Modified version ===
တကောင်းအဘိရာဇာ၊ တို့ဗမာ သာကီမျိုးဟာမို့ မညှိုး ဂုဏ်တေဇာ၊
များစွာပတိုင်းများကိုပါကိုပါ၊ တိုက်ခိုက်ကာ အောင်ခဲ့တာ တို့ဗမာ၊
စိန်မှန်ကင်းအစစ်၊ အဖြစ်ကြီးဖြစ်လျက်၊ ထင်းတလှည့် ကြုံရ၊
ထုံးနှင့်မသွေ၊ လောကဓမ္မတာပေ၊ ငါတို့ ကံခေ ဖြစ်ရပြန်သလေ၊
သို့သော် အရင်းကိုစစ်လျှင် ဗမာပြည် ငါတို့ ငါတို့ပြေ။
နောင်ဥဒါန်း ဘယ်မကြေစရာ၊ ရာဇဝင်တင်ထား မျိုးရိုးနွယ်လာ၊
ကမ္ဘာတခွင်မှာဖြင့် ဗမာအထင်အရှား တို့ခေတ်တွင်မှ ညံ့ကြတော့မှာလား
တို့ဗမာ၊ တို့ဗမာ မဟုတ်လေသလား
𝄆 တို့ဗမာ ငါတို့ဗမာ 𝄇 𝄆 ဒါ ငါတို့ဗမာ 𝄇
အားလုံး ညီညီ ယောက်ျားဘသား တို့ဗမာ
နောင်လာနောက်သား ကောင်းစားဖို့ရာ
တို့ကိုယ်ကျိုး လုံးလုံးမပါ၊
ရဲရဲဗမာပီပီ ဗမာပြေ တို့ဗမာဖို့ပါ၊
သခင်ကျင့်ကို ကျင့်ကြပါ၊ သခင်မျိုးဟေ့ တို့ဗမာ၊
မိုးအောက်မြေပြင်မှာ အထက်တန်းစိတ်နဲ့ စာမရီသွေး တို့ဗမာ။

𝄆 ကမ္ဘာမကြေ ဗမာတွေ ဒါတို့ပြေ ဒါတို့မြေ ဒါငါတို့ပြေ 𝄇
𝄆 ဒါတို့ပြေ ဒါတို့မြေ ဒါငါတို့ပြေ 𝄇
𝄆 တို့ဗမာ 𝄇 ပြေကို တိုင်းရင်းသား အကုန်အစင်၊
တို့ပြေလို့ မှတ်ထင်၊
တို့ဝတ္တရားပင် တို့ဗမာသခင်။

အမျိုးသားရေး ကြိုးပမ်းကြပါ တို့ဗမာ ဟေ့ တို့ဗမာ၊
ဪ အမျိုးသားရေး ကြိုးပမ်းကြပါ၊ တို့ဗမာ ဟေ့ တို့ဗမာ၊
အရှေ့ကနေဝန်း ထွက်သည့်ပမာပ၊
တို့ခေတ်ကိုတော့ ရောက်ရမည်မှာ မလွဲပါ၊ တို့ဗမာ ဟေ့တို့ဗမာ၊
ဗမာပြည်တဝှမ်း အကုန်၊ တို့အိမ်မှတ်ပါ၊ တို့ယာမှတ်ပါ၊ အဲဒါ တို့ဗမာ။

𝄆 ကမ္ဘာမကြေ ဗမာတွေ ဒါတို့ပြေ ဒါတို့မြေ ဒါငါတို့ပြေ 𝄇
𝄆 ဒါတို့ပြေ ဒါတို့မြေ ဒါငါတို့ပြေ 𝄇
𝄆 တို့ဗမာ 𝄇 ပြေကို တိုင်းရင်းသား အကုန်အစင်၊
တို့ပြေလို့ မှတ်ထင်၊
တို့ဝတ္တရားပင် တို့ဗမာသခင်။
