= Marathi phonology =

Sounds and pronunciation of the Marathi language

The phoneme inventory of the Marathi language is similar to that of many other Indo-Aryan languages. An IPA chart of all contrastive sounds in Marathi is provided below.

== Vowels ==
Vowels in native words are:

Vowels
	Front	Central	Back
High	i		u
Mid	e	ə	o
Low	(æ)	a	(ɔ)

There is almost no phonemic length distinction, even though it is indicated in the script. Nevertheless /ə/, /i/, and /u/ are generally realized as [ɤ̞ː], [iː], and [uː], respectively, in monosyllabic words. Furthermore, /i/ and /u/ may be realized as either short or long in word-final positions, while /a/, /e/, and /o/ may be realized as either short or long in any position. For instance, monosyllabic कळ (kaḷa), विष (viṣa), and सुख (sukha) are generally pronounced as [kɤ̞ː𝼈 ], [ʋiːʂ], and [suːkʰ], respectively, despite having a short vowel in the orthography. On the other hand, polysyllabic कळलं (kaḷalaṁ), विषारी (viṣārī), सुखी (sukhī), and तूपामध्ये (tūpāmadhye), are pronounced as [kə𝼈lə], [ʋiʂä(ː)ɾi(ː)], [sukʰi(ː)], and [t̪upä(ː)məd̪ʱʲe(ː)], respectively, despite the latter having an initial long vowel in the orthography. Some educated speakers further try to maintain a length distinction corresponding to the orthography in learned borrowings (tatsamas) from Sanskrit.

Unlike Konkani or Hindustani, there are no phonemic nasal vowels in Marathi.

Marathi only has four phonemic diphthongs: /əi, əu, ai, au/.

The vowels /æ/ and /ɔ/ only appear in loanwords, and are represented in writing by the letters ⟨अ‍ॅ⟩ and ⟨ऑ⟩ respectively.

Marathi retains several features of Sanskrit that have been lost in other Indo-Aryan languages such as Hindi and Bengali, especially in terms of pronunciation of vowels and consonants. For instance, Marathi retains the original diphthong qualities of ⟨ऐ⟩ [əi], and ⟨औ⟩ [əu] which became monophthongs in Hindi. However, similar to speakers of Western Indo-Aryan languages and Dravidian languages, Marathi speakers tend to pronounce syllabic consonant ⟨ऋ⟩ as [ru], unlike Northern Indo-Aryan languages which changed it to [ri] (e.g. the original Sanskrit pronunciation of the language's name-root saṃskṛta was [sɐ̃skr̩t̪ɐ], while in Marathi it is [səw̃.skrut̪]; in the aforementioned Northern Indo-Aryan languages, it is [sən.skrɪt̪]). While Marathi has also undegone schwa deletion like other Indo-Aryan languages in word-final positions, it has conserved the schwas after consonant clusters in words like शब्द (śabda, ‘word’) and also reintroduced it for certain words.

== Consonants ==
Consonants
		Labial	Dental	Alveolar	Retroflex	(Alveolo-) palatal	Velar	Glottal
Nasal	plain	m	n		ɳ	(ɲ)	(ŋ)	
Nasal	murmured	mʱ	nʱ		ɳʱ			
Plosive/ Affricate	voiceless	p	t̪	t͡s	ʈ	t͡ɕ~t͡ʃ	k	
Plosive/ Affricate	aspirated	pʰ~f	t̪ʰ		ʈʰ	t͡ɕʰ~t͡ʃʰ	kʰ	
Plosive/ Affricate	voiced	b	d̪	d͡z~z	ɖ~ɽ	d͡ʑ~d͡ʒ	ɡ	
Plosive/ Affricate	murmured	bʱ	d̪ʱ	d͡zʱ~zʱ	ɖʱ~ɽʱ	d͡ʑʱ~d͡ʒʱ	ɡʱ	
Fricative			s		ʂ	ɕ~ʃ		h~ɦ
Approximant	plain	ʋ		l	(ɭ)	j		
Approximant	murmured	ʋʱ		lʱ		(jʱ)		
Flap/Trill	plain			ɾ~r	𝼈			
Flap/Trill	murmured			ɾʱ~rʱ				

Notes

- Marathi used to have a /t͡sʰ/ but it merged with /s/.
- Some speakers pronounce /d͡z, d͡zʱ/ as fricatives but the aspiration is maintained in /zʱ/.
- Spoken Marathi in Marathwada-Vidarbha regions frequently simplifies the retroflexes /ɳ/, and /ʂ/ to /n/ and /s/; for example, आणि (āṇi, 'and') will be pronounced as [aːn] instead of [aːɳi].
- Unlike in Hindustani, Marathi does not contrast /ɖ/ and /ɽ/ or /ɖʱ/ and /ɽʱ/. Instead, the pairs are conditional allophones, being realized as stops in word-initial or post-nasal positions and as flaps in all other positions.

In Marathi, the Indo-Aryan /l/ split into a retroflex lateral flap ḷ when singular and alveolar l when doubled. It shares this feature with Odia, Punjabi, Gujarati, and other Western Indo-Aryan languages. For example, Sanskrit kulam, 'clan' becomes kuḷa and Sanskrit kamalam, 'lotus' becomes kamaḷa, Sanskrit tila, velli, cullī, bhalla, lulla, Marathi tīḷ, vel, ċūl, bhalā, lulā. Another source is from sporadic ḍ, e.g. Sanskrit dāḍima, ṣṓḍaśa, 'pomegranate', '16', Marathi ḍāḷimba, soḷā. Marathi may have gotten ḷ due to the areal influence of the neighbouring Dravidian languages; there are some ḷ words loaned from Kannada like ṭhaḷak from taḷaku but most of the words are native. Vedic Sanskrit also had /𝼈, 𝼈ʱ/, but they merged with /ɖ, ɖʱ/ by the time of classical Sanskrit, these are unrelated to modern IA ḷ.

Palatalization is phonemic for some consonants, but it has not been well studied. Furthermore, palatalization is only denoted for र (r) in writing through the usage of the eyelash reph/raphar, further complicating analysis. The following table gives two minimal pairs (in Standard Marathi) as examples:

Consonant Cluster	IPA	Palatalized	IPA
तुल्य (tulya, 'equal')	[t̪ul.jə]	बाहुल्या (bahulyā, 'dolls')	[baːɦulʲaː]
दर्या (dar'yā, 'ocean')	[d̪əɾ.jaː]	दऱ्या (daryā, 'valleys')	[d̪əɾʲaː]

Additionally, an anusvara may be pronounced as a nasalized approximant in certain locations. When preceding श (ś), ष (ṣ), स (s), ह (h), or र (r), it is rendered as w̃. For example, the words संशय (saṁśaya, 'doubt') and संरक्षण (saṁrakṣaṇa, 'protection') are pronounced as [səw̃.ɕəj] and [səw̃rəkʂəɳ] respectively. Before य (y), the anusvara is rendered as j̃: for example, संयुक्त (saṁyukta, 'joint') is pronounced as [səj̃jukt̪ə].

Some dialects tend to simplify consonant clusters that are otherwise plentiful in standard Marathi. This might be an adaptation to a faster speaking pace. For example, in the region surrounding Satara, "त्यांच्यासाठी" is often pronounced as "त्यांसनी", eliminating the "ñchy" cluster.
