= Thakins =

We Burmans Association တို့ဗမာအစည်းအရုံး
- Abbreviation: DAA
- Founder: Ba Thaung
- Founded: 30 May 1930
- Dissolved: 1940s
- Succeeded by: Anti-Fascist People's Freedom League (de facto)
- Headquarters: Rangoon
- Armed wing: Letyon Tat
- Ideology: Burman Nationalism; Communism; Socialism
- Slogan: "Burma is our country; Burmese literature is our literature; Burmese language is our language. Love our country, raise the standards of our literature, respect our language."
- Anthem: "We Burmans" (တို့ဗမာ, Do Bama)

Flag
- Other Flags:

Dobama Asiayone (Burmese: တို့ဗမာအစည်းအရုံး Dobăma Ăsiăyon, pronounced [do̰.bəmà ʔəsíʔəjóʊɴ]; lit. 'We Burmans Association'), better known as Thakins (Burmese: သခင် thăhking, IPA: [θəkʰɪ̀ɰ̃]; lit. 'Master'), was a Burmese nationalist group formed around the 1930s and composed of young, disgruntled intellectuals. Drawing their name from the way in which the British were addressed during colonial times, the party was established by Ba Thaung in May 1930, bringing together traditionalist Buddhist nationalist elements and fresh leftist political ideals. It was significant in stirring up political consciousness in Burma, and drew most of its support base from students.

The party's song, Myanmar Kaba Ma Kyei ("Till The End of the World, Burma") also became the country's first national song and eventually its national anthem. Composed by Saya Tin (later known as "Thakhin Tin"), the song was a national symbol during the Japanese occupation of Burma and was adopted in 1948 upon the achievement of independence.

== History ==
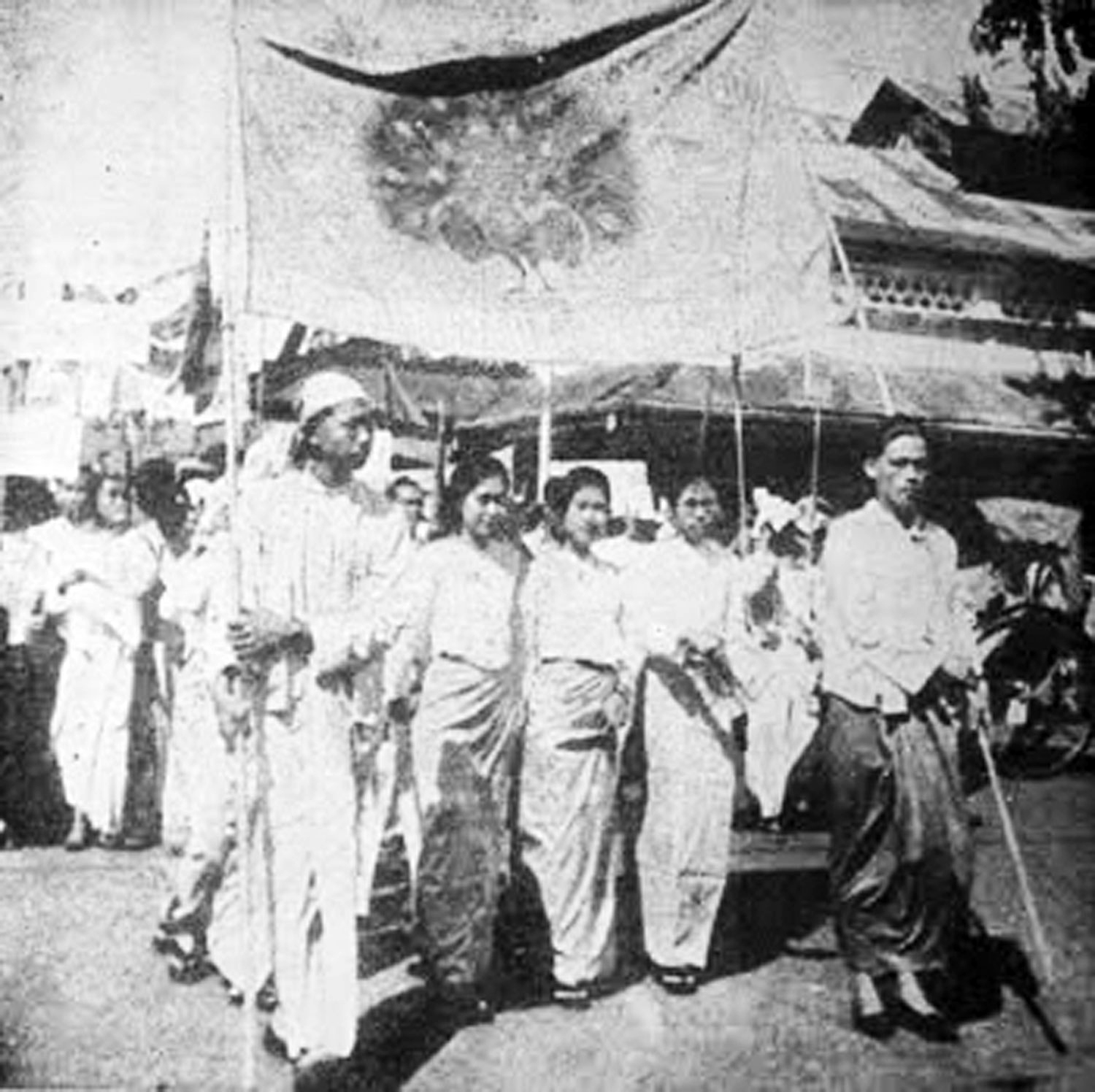
A Dobama protest

The DAA was established in 1930 in Rangoon after Burmese Indian dock workers and their families were murdered by Bamars who believed that the Indians had taken jobs that rightfully belonged to them. The Dobama organisation was nationalist in nature, and supported Bamar supremacy. Its members used the Burmese word Thakhin ("master") as their honorific title rather than the standard U or Maung, as Thakhin was the word traditionally used to address the British. The slogan of the organisation was "Burma (Myanmar) is our country; Burmese literature is our literature; Burmese language is our language. Love our country, raise the standards of our literature, respect our language." Dobama Asiayone was keen assimilating ethnic minorities into Burman culture, and most of its activities stemmed from Rangoon University. Unlike former parties in Burma, the DAA was not reliant on support from foreign interests or Buddhist monks, and its establishment was a significant change in Burmese political history. Its founders rejected compromise with the British authorities, and formed its own paramilitary group, the Letyon Tat.

In 1935 the closely affiliated All-Burma Youth League merged into the DAA and its first conference was held in Shwebo. Following the second conference in Myingyan in 1936, the Thakhins decided to contest the 1936 elections under the name Komin Kochin Aphwe (One's own King, One's own Kind Party). It put forward 28 candidates three of which were elected; Thakhin Mya in Tharrawaddy South, Thakhin Hla Tin in Henzada East and Thakhin Ant Gyi in Pakokku South.

Despite winning three seats, the Thakhin group temporarily became inactive until being resurrected in 1937 under the leadership of participants in the 1936 student strike, including Aung San and U Nu. This led to a split, with the older leaders being opposed to the left-wing leanings of the new leadership.

By the late 1930s, the Thakhins had risen through the ranks to emerge as a prominent nationalist group. To achieve its objectives, the group committed itself to the use violent means, such as strikes and force. In 1937, a Thakhin leader had surfaced: a young lawyer by the name of Aung San. In 1939, the Thakhins took over the Dobama Asiayone and brought about the collapse of the government of Ba Maw, then the premier of the country. In 1940 the Thakhins and Ba Maw's Poor Man's Party merged to form the Freedom Bloc, although the DAA founded the People's Revolutionary Party in secret.

In 1946 a new DAA was established by founding members Ba Sein and Tun Oke. Although it failed to achieve widespread support, Ba Sein and Tun Oke were both included in the Governor Reginald Dorman-Smith's Executive Council in 1946. The party continued to exist into the 1950s, but was not successful in elections.

== Achievements ==
The Thakhins were credited for the formation of the Burma Independence Army. In 1940, a Japanese army officer, Colonel Suzuki Keiji, took thirty Thakhins including Aung San and Ne Win for military training at Japanese schools in Formosa (Taiwan) and Hainan. These thirty Thakhins, known as the Thirty Comrades, were the founding members of the Burma Independence Army, which would later number around 8000 men. When the Japanese invaded Burma in late 1941 and early 1942, the BIA marched with the Japanese to expel the British. On 1 August 1943, the Japanese granted Burma a kind of independence. The BIA was renamed the Burma National Army (BNA). Recognising that the Japanese had merely replaced the British rather than providing the independence they sought, in March 1945, the Burma National Army turned on the Japanese as the British Fourteenth Army advanced on Rangoon.

== See also ==
- Patriotic Association of Myanmar
- Thakins and the Struggle for National Independence (1930–1948)
