= Voiceless alveolo-palatal affricate =

Consonantal sound

tɕ

ʨ

cɕ
- IPA number: 215

Audio sample
- source · help

Encoding
- Entity (decimal): &#680;
- Unicode (hex): U+02A8
- X-SAMPA: t_s\
Image

A voiceless alveolo-palatal sibilant affricate is a type of consonantal sound, used in some spoken languages. The symbols in the International Phonetic Alphabet that represent this sound are ⟨t͡ɕ⟩, ⟨t͜ɕ⟩. The tie bar may be omitted, yielding ⟨tɕ⟩. There is also a ligature ⟨ʨ⟩, which has been retired by the International Phonetic Association but is still used. Occasionally the stop component is transcribed ⟨c⟩. An older transcription that indicated approximately the same sound was ⟨tʆ⟩.

⟨t⟩ is a broad transcription of the stop component, which can be narrowly transcribed as ⟨t̠ʲ⟩ (retracted and palatalized [t]). There is also a para-IPA letter ⟨ȶ⟩. Therefore, narrow transcriptions include ⟨t̠ʲɕ⟩ and ⟨ȶɕ⟩. However, this is not normally done because the stop component is by default assumed to be homorganic with the fricative component of the consonant.

[tɕ] occurs in languages such as Mandarin Chinese, Japanese, Polish, Serbo-Croatian or Russian, and is the sibilant equivalent of the voiceless palatal affricate. U+107AB 𐞫 MODIFIER LETTER SMALL TC DIGRAPH WITH CURL is a superscript IPA letter.

== Features ==
Features of a voiceless alveolo-palatal affricate:

- Its manner of articulation is sibilant affricate, which means it is produced by first stopping the air flow entirely, then directing it with the tongue to the sharp edge of the teeth, causing high-frequency turbulence.
- Its place of articulation is alveolo-palatal. This means that:
  - The articulation is postalveolar and laminal, meaning that the tongue blade contacts the roof of the mouth in the area behind the alveolar ridge (the gum line). Some phoneticians instead argue that the articulation is pre-palatal and dorsal, meaning that the back of the tongue (the dorsum) is raised toward the front of the hard palate.
  - It is heavily palatalized, meaning that the middle of the tongue is bowed and raised towards the hard palate.
- Its phonation is voiceless, which means it is produced without vibrations of the vocal cords. In some languages the vocal cords are actively separated, so it is always voiceless; in others the cords are lax, so that it may take on the voicing of adjacent sounds.
- It is an oral consonant, which means that air is not allowed to escape through the nose.
- It is a median consonant, which means it is produced by directing the airstream down the midline of the tongue, rather than to the sides.
- Its airstream mechanism is pulmonic, which means it is articulated by pushing air only with the intercostal muscles and abdominal muscles, as in most speech sounds.

== Occurrence ==
Language		Word	IPA	Meaning	Notes
Bengali		চিতল / citol	[ˈtɕit̪ol]	'Chitala chitala'	Contrasts with aspirated forms. See Bengali phonology
Burmese		ကျ / kyạ	[t͡ɕä̰ʔ]	'to fall'	See Burmese phonology
Catalan	Most dialects	cotxe	[ˈko(t)t͡ɕə]	'car'	See Catalan phonology
Catalan	Valencian	xec	[ˈt͡ɕek]	'cheque'	Usual initial and post-consonantal affrication found in Standard Valencian. See Catalan phonology
Catalan	Central Valencian	mitjà	[mi̞ˈt͡ɕa]	'means'	Devoiced allophone of /d͡ʒ/ [d͡ʑ] in parts of Central Valencian and Eastern Aragon. See Catalan phonology
Catalan	Central Valencian	joc	[ˈt͡ɕɒ̝k]	'game'	Devoiced allophone of /d͡ʒ/ [d͡ʑ] (i.e., /ʒ/ [ʑ] in Eastern Catalan) in parts of Central Valencian and Eastern Aragon. See Catalan phonology
Catalan	Some dialects	tots	[ˈt̪ot͡ɕ]	'all', 'everyone'	Coda allophone of /t͡s/ found in some cases in some dialects. See Catalan phonology
Chinese	Cantonese	豬 / Yale: jyū / Jyutping: zyu¹	[t͡ɕyː˥]	'pig'	Contrasts with aspirated form. Allophone of /t͡s/, usually in front of the front high vowels /iː/, /ɪ/, /yː/. See Cantonese phonology
Chinese	Mandarin	北京 / Běijīng	[peɪ̯˨˩.t͡ɕiŋ˥]	'Beijing'	Contrasts with aspirated form. Pronounced by some speakers as a palatalized dental. In complementary distribution with [t͡s], [k], and [ʈ͡ʂ] series. See Standard Chinese phonology
Chuvash		чипер / çiper	[t͡ɕʲi̞ˈp̬ʲɛ̝r]	'cute'	
Danish		tjener	[ˈt͡ɕeːnɐ]	'servant'	Normal realization of the sequence /tj/. See Danish phonology
Dutch		gaatjes	[ˈɣaːt͡ɕəs]	'little holes'	
Dzongkha		ཆུ / chu	[t͡ɕʰu˥]	'water'	
Frainc-Comtou		cïntçhe	[sĩt͡ɕ]	'five'	
Irish	Some dialects	tír	[t͡ɕiːɾʲ]	'country'	Realization of the palatalized alveolar stop /tʲ/ in dialects such as Erris, Teelin and Tourmakeady. See Irish phonology
Japanese		知人 / chijin	[t͡ɕi(d)ʑĩ́ɴ]	'acquaintance'	See Japanese phonology
Kalmyk		чееҗ / cheej	[t͡ɕeːd͡ʑə̟́]	'chest'	
Karen	S'gaw Karen	ကၠိ	[t͡ɕó]	'school'	
Karen	Eastern Pwo	ကျုင်း	[t͡ɕə́ɯ̯̃ɴ]	'to be lazy'	
Karen	Western Pwo	ကၠုၪ့	[t͡ɕə̀]	'to be lazy'	
Korean	South	제비 / jebi	[t͡ɕebi]	'swallow'	See Korean phonology
Kyrgyz	Kizilsu dialects	чоң / chong	[t͡ɕʰoŋ]	'big'	Corresponds to postalveolar [tʃ] in standard Kyrgyz. See Kyrgyz phonology
Marathi		चिंच / ciñca	[t͡ɕint̪͡sə]	'tamarind'	Contrasts with aspirated form. Allophone of [tʃ]. See Marathi phonology
Mochica		c̓harke	[t͡ɕarke]	'parrot'	
Mongolian	Khalkha	жил / jil	[t͡ɕiɬ]	'year'	See Mongolian phonology
Okinawan		'ucinaaguci	[ʔut͡ɕinaːɡut͡ɕi]	'Okinawan language'	Merged with [ts].
Polish		ćma	[t͡ɕmä]	'moth'	See Polish phonology
Romanian	Banat dialect	frate	[ˈfrat͡ɕe]	'brother'	Allophone of /t/ before front vowels. Corresponds to [t] in standard Romanian. See Romanian phonology
Russian		чуть / čutj	[t͡ɕʉtʲ]	'barely'	See Russian phonology
Sema		akichi	[à̠kìt͡ɕì]	'mouth'	Possible allophone of /t͡ʃ/ before /i, e/; can be realized as [t͡ʃ] instead.
Serbo-Croatian		лећа / leća	[lět͡ɕä]	'lentils'	Merges into /t͡ʃ/ in dialects that do not distinguish /ʈ͡ʂ/ from /t͡ɕ/.
Slovene	Dialects with tʼ–č distinction (such as Resian)	teči	[ˈt̪ɛ̀ːt͡ɕì]	'con artist'	In Standard Slovene obsolete. See Slovene phonology
Sorbian	Lower	šćit	[ɕt͡ɕit̪]	'protection'	
Swedish	Finland	kjol	[t͡ɕuːl]	'skirt'	See Swedish phonology
Thai		จาน / cān	[t͡ɕaːn]	'dish'	Contrasts with aspirated form.
Tuvan		чон / chon	[t͡ɕʰɔ̝n]	'people'	
Udmurt		чорыг	[t͡ɕoˈrɯ̈k]	'fish'	
Urarina		katsa	[kat͡ɕá]	'man'	
Uyghur		چوڭ / chong / чоң	[t͡ɕʰoŋ]	'big'	
Uzbek		çumoli / чумоли	[t͡ɕʊ̟mɒ̽ˈlɪ̞]	'ant'	Often transcribed as /tʃ/. See Uzbek phonology
Vietnamese		cha	[t͡ɕa]	'father'	See Vietnamese phonology
Xumi		[t͡ɕɐ˦]		'star'	
Yi		ꏢ / ji	[t͡ɕi˧]	'sour'	Contrasts aspirated and unaspirated forms

== See also ==
- Index of phonetics articles

== Notes ==
Place →	Labial					Coronal										Dorsal					Laryngeal			
Manner ↓	Bilabial		Labiodental		Linguolabial		Dental		Alveolar		Postalveolar		Retroflex		(Alveolo-)palatal		Velar		Uvular		Pharyngeal/epiglottal		Glottal	
Nasal	m̥	m	ɱ̊	ɱ		n̼	n̪̊	n̪	n̥	n	n̠̊	n̠	ɳ̊	ɳ	ɲ̊	ɲ	ŋ̊	ŋ	ɴ̥	ɴ				
Plosive	p	b	p̪	b̪	t̼	d̼	t̪	d̪	t	d			ʈ	ɖ	c	ɟ	k	ɡ	q	ɢ	ʡ		ʔ	
Sibilant affricate							t̪s̪	d̪z̪	ts	dz	t̠ʃ	d̠ʒ	tʂ	dʐ	tɕ	dʑ								
Non-sibilant affricate	pɸ	bβ	p̪f	b̪v			t̪θ	d̪ð	tɹ̝̊	dɹ̝	t̠ɹ̠̊˔	d̠ɹ̠˔			cç	ɟʝ	kx	ɡɣ	qχ	ɢʁ	ʡʜ	ʡʢ	ʔh	
Sibilant fricative							s̪	z̪	s	z	ʃ	ʒ	ʂ	ʐ	ɕ	ʑ								
Non-sibilant fricative	ɸ	β	f	v	θ̼	ð̼	θ	ð	θ̠	ð̠	ɹ̠̊˔	ɹ̠˔	ɻ̊˔	ɻ˔	ç	ʝ	x	ɣ	χ	ʁ	ħ	ʕ	h	ɦ
Approximant		β̞		ʋ				ð̞		ɹ		ɹ̠		ɻ		j		ɰ						˷
Tap/flap		ⱱ̟		ⱱ					ɾ̥	ɾ			ɽ̊	ɽ						ɢ̆		ʡ̆		
Trill	ʙ̥	ʙ							r̥	r		r̠	ɽ̊r̥	ɽr					ʀ̥	ʀ	ʜ	ʢ		
Lateral affricate									tɬ	dɮ			tꞎ	d𝼅	c𝼆	ɟʎ̝	k𝼄	ɡʟ̝						
Lateral fricative							ɬ̪		ɬ	ɮ			ꞎ	𝼅	𝼆	ʎ̝	𝼄	ʟ̝						
Lateral approximant								l̪	l̥	l		l̠	ɭ̊	ɭ	ʎ̥	ʎ	ʟ̥	ʟ		ʟ̠				
Lateral tap/flap									ɺ̥	ɺ			𝼈̊	𝼈		ʎ̆		ʟ̆						

		BL	LD	D	A	PA	RF	P	V	U
Implosive	Voiced	ɓ			ɗ		ᶑ	ʄ	ɠ	ʛ
Implosive	Voiceless	ɓ̥			ɗ̥		ᶑ̊	ʄ̊	ɠ̊	ʛ̥
Ejective	Stop	pʼ			tʼ		ʈʼ	cʼ	kʼ	qʼ
Ejective	Affricate		p̪fʼ	tθʼ	tsʼ	tʃʼ	tʂʼ	tɕʼ	kxʼ	qχʼ
Ejective	Fricative	ɸʼ	fʼ	θʼ	sʼ	ʃʼ	ʂʼ	ɕʼ	xʼ	χʼ
Ejective	Lateral affricate				tɬʼ			c𝼆ʼ	k𝼄ʼ	q𝼄ʼ
Ejective	Lateral fricative				ɬʼ					
Click (top: velar; bottom: uvular)	Tenuis	kʘ qʘ		kǀ qǀ	kǃ qǃ		k𝼊 q𝼊	kǂ qǂ		
Click (top: velar; bottom: uvular)	Voiced	ɡʘ ɢʘ		ɡǀ ɢǀ	ɡǃ ɢǃ		ɡ𝼊 ɢ𝼊	ɡǂ ɢǂ		
Click (top: velar; bottom: uvular)	Nasal	ŋʘ ɴʘ		ŋǀ ɴǀ	ŋǃ ɴǃ		ŋ𝼊 ɴ𝼊	ŋǂ ɴǂ	ʞ	
Click (top: velar; bottom: uvular)	Tenuis lateral				kǁ qǁ					
Click (top: velar; bottom: uvular)	Voiced lateral				ɡǁ ɢǁ					
Click (top: velar; bottom: uvular)	Nasal lateral				ŋǁ ɴǁ					
