= YMB Saya Tin =

Burmese composer (1894–1950)

YMB Sayar Tin YMB ဆရာတင်
- Born: 11 February 1894 (Note: In Burmese: Sunday, 7th waxing of Tabodwe 1255 ME.)
- Origin: Mandalay
- Died: 8 August 1950 (aged 56) (Note: In Burmese: Tuesday, 10th waning of 2nd Waso 1312 ME.)
- Genres: Traditional Burmese music
- Occupations: Musician, composer, teacher
- Years active: 1918–1950

YMB Saya Tin (Burmese: ဝိုင်အမ်ဘီဆရာတင်, pronounced [wàɪ.àɰ̃.bì sʰəjà tɪ̀ɰ̃]; 11 February 1894 – 8 August 1950) was a Burmese composer. He was one of three well known pre-war composers with the name Sayar Tin. The others were Nandawshay Saya Tin and Thahaya Sayar Tin. He is best known for composing "Kaba Ma Kyei", the national anthem of Myanmar.

== Early life ==
Tin was born in Mandalay on 11 February 1894 (7th waxing of Tabodwe 1255 ME) to Daw Thein and her husband U Yan Aung, a former official in the service of the last Burmese king Thibaw. He had one elder sister and one younger sister.

After finishing high school at the age of 17, Tin worked as a schoolteacher in a private school for the next three years. During his leisure time, Tin took up playing his concertina, exploring its sounds, and studying traditional Burmese music.

== Musical career ==
In 1918, Tin founded his own private school, the Young Men's Buddhist School in Mandalay, and came to be known as YMB Saya Tin (săya meaning 'teacher' in Burmese). His school's musical troupe performed free of charge at charity events and weddings.

In 1930, Tin shut down his school and moved to Yangon, where his songs had been recorded and used in films. Tin met up with an old classmate of his, Tha Khin Ba Thaung, and joined his political movement known as Dobama Asiayone (lit. 'We Burmese Association').

== National anthem of Myanmar ==
In 1930, Tin composed Dobama Song (တို့ဗမာသီချင်း – lit. 'We Burmans Song'), in 1930, with Ba Thaung supplying the lyrics. Tin himself gave the first ceremonial rendition of the song on the flat ground of Shwedagon Pagoda at 5:00 pm on 20 July 1930. After the ceremony, Tin was imprisoned by British officers, who accused him of inciting insurgents. He was later released in 1946. In 1942, the song was adopted as the national anthem of the State of Burma. In 1947, it was used as a template for the national anthem of the Union of Burma, for which Tin was awarded Rs.1,000/-. The Burmese government awarded him the title Wunna Kyawhtin (lit. 'The Beautiful-Famous One') on Independence Day, 4 January 1948.

== Death ==
Tin died of tuberculosis on 8 August 1950, aged 56, and was buried in Yangon. Tin had composed over 4,000 songs.
