= Thakins and the Struggle for National Independence (1930–1948) =

2009 book by Tekkatho Sein Tin

Thakins and the Struggle for National Independence သခင်များနှင့် အမျိုးသား လွတ်လပ်ရေး ကြိုးပမ်းမှုကြီး (၁၉၃၀-၁၉၄၈)
- Author: Tekkatho Sein Tin
- Cover artist: Bagyi Ant Bwe Zin
- Language: Burmese
- Subject: Biographical
- Genre: History
- Publication date: October 2009
- Publication place: Myanmar
- Media type: hardcover
- Pages: 472 (first edition)

Thakins and the Struggle for National Independence (1930–1948) (Burmese: သခင်များနှင့် အမျိုးသား လွတ်လပ်ရေး ကြိုးပမ်းမှုကြီး (၁၉၃၀–၁၉၄၈) is a book by Tekkatho Sein Tin, first published in 2009. This book includes biographies of several key leaders of Dobama Asiayone, a 1930s Burmese nationalist organization dedicated to overturn the British rule in Burma.

== Publication ==
According to the author, he wrote book at the urging Thakin Khin Nyunt, founder of Sarpay Lawka Book Center. A few surviving members of Dobama Asiayone including Thakin San Hlaing, Thakin Chit Maung (Widura), Thakin Khin Aung, Thakin Chit (Daydaye), Thakin Thein Pe (Wakema).

== Contents ==
The book contains biographies of the following:

=== Elders of Dobama Asiayone ===
1. Thakin Kodaw Hmaing
2. Thakin Maung Gyi
3. Thakin Soe Thein

=== Presidents ===
1. Thakin Ba Thaung
2. Thakin Ba Sein
3. Thakin Lay Maung
4. Thakin Thein Maung Gyi
5. Thakin Tun Oke
6. Thakin Mya

=== Secretary ===
1. Thakin Aung San
