= Voiceless retroflex fricative =

Consonantal sound represented by ⟨ʂ⟩ in IPA

ʂ
- IPA number: 136

Audio sample
- source · help

Encoding
- Entity (decimal): &#642;
- Unicode (hex): U+0282
- X-SAMPA: s`
- Braille: ⠲ (braille pattern dots-256) ⠎ (braille pattern dots-234)
Image

A voiceless retroflex sibilant fricative is a type of consonantal sound used in some spoken languages. The symbol in the International Phonetic Alphabet that represents this sound is ⟨ʂ⟩ which is a Latin letter s combined with a retroflex hook. Like all the retroflex consonants, the IPA letter is formed by adding a rightward-pointing hook to the bottom of ⟨s⟩ (the letter used for the corresponding alveolar consonant). A distinction can be made between laminal, apical, and subapical articulations.

== Features ==
Sagittal section of a voiceless retroflex fricative

Features of a voiceless retroflex fricative:

- Its manner of articulation is sibilant (a subclass of fricatives and affricates), which means it is generally produced with a higher-frequency turbulence. Sibilants may be articulated with various tongue shapes and degrees of palatalization, depending on their place of articulation.
- Its place of articulation is retroflex, which prototypically means it is articulated subapical (with the tip of the tongue curled up), but more generally, it means that it is postalveolar without being palatalized. That is, besides the prototypical subapical articulation, the tongue can be apical (pointed) or, in some fricatives, laminal (flat).
- Its phonation is voiceless, which means it is produced without vibrations of the vocal cords. In some languages the vocal cords are actively separated, so it is always voiceless; in others the cords are lax, so that it may take on the voicing of adjacent sounds.
- It is an oral consonant, which means that air is not allowed to escape through the nose.
- It is a median consonant, which means it is produced by directing the airstream down the midline of the tongue, rather than to the sides.
- Its airstream mechanism is pulmonic, which means it is articulated by pushing air only with the intercostal muscles and abdominal muscles, as in most speech sounds.

== Occurrence ==
In the following transcriptions, diacritics may be used to distinguish between apical [ʂ̺] and laminal [ʂ̻].

The commonality of [ʂ] cross-linguistically is 6% in a phonological analysis of 2155 languages.

Language		Word	IPA	Meaning	Notes
Abkhaz		амш / amš	[ɑmʂ]	'day'	See Abkhaz phonology
Adyghe		пшъашъэ / پصاصە / pŝaŝə	[pʂ̻aːʂ̻a]	'girl'	Laminal.
Chinese	Mandarin	石 / shí	[ʂ̺ɻ̩˧˥]	'stone'	Apical. See Mandarin phonology
Emilian-Romagnol	Romagnol	sé	[ˈʂĕ]	'yes'	Apical; may be [s̺ʲ] or [ʃ] instead.
English	General American	worship	[wəɹʂɪp]	'worship'	Allophone of [ʃ] after [ɹ].
Faroese		fýrs	[fʊʂ]	'eighty'	
Hindustani	Hindi	कष्ट / kaṣṭ	[ˈkəʂʈ]	'trouble'	See Hindi phonology
Hmong		𖬤𖬵 / sau	[ʂau˧]	'to write'	
Kannada		ಕಷ್ಟ / kaṣṭa	[kɐʂʈɐ]	'difficult'	Only in loanwords. See Kannada phonology.
Khanty	Most northern dialects	шаш / šaš	[ʂɑʂ]	'knee'	Corresponds to a voiceless retroflex affricate /ʈ͡ʂ/ in the southern and eastern dialects.
Kyrgyz		Ош / Oş	[o̞ʂ]	'Osh'	Allophone of /ʃ/. See Kyrgyz phonology
Lower Sorbian		glažk	[ˈɡläʂk]	'glass'	
Malayalam		കഷ്ടം / kaṣṭaṁ	[kɐʂʈɐm]	'difficult'	Only occurs in loanwords. See Malayalam phonology
Mapudungun		trukur	[ʈ͡ʂʊ̝ˈkʊʂ]	'fog'	Possible allophone of /ʐ/ in post-nuclear position.
Marathi		ऋषी / reṣī	[r̩ʂiː]	'sage'	See Marathi phonology
Nepali		षष्ठी / ṣaṣṭhī	[sʌʂʈʰi]	'Shashthi (day)'	Allophone of /s/ in neighbourhood of retroflex consonants. See Nepali phonology
Norwegian		karsk	[kaʂk]	'healthy'	Allophone of the sequence /ɾs/ in many dialects, including Urban East Norwegian. See Norwegian phonology
Oʼodham		Cuk Ṣon	[t͡ʃʊk ʂ̺ɔn]	'Tucson'	Apical.
Pashto	Southern dialect	ښودل / šodël	[ʂodəl]	'to show'	
Polish	Standard	szum	[ʂ̻um]	'rustle'	After voiceless consonants it is also represented by ⟨rz⟩. When written so, it can be instead pronounced as the voiceless raised alveolar non-sonorant trill by few speakers. Transcribed /ʃ/ by most Polish scholars. See Polish phonology
Polish	Southeastern Cuyavian dialects	schowali	[ʂxɔˈväli]	'they hid'	Some speakers. It's a result of hypercorrecting the more popular merger of /ʂ/ and /s/ into [s] (see szadzenie).
Polish	Suwałki dialect	schowali	[ʂxɔˈväli]	'they hid'	Some speakers. It's a result of hypercorrecting the more popular merger of /ʂ/ and /s/ into [s] (see szadzenie).
Romanian	Moldavian dialects	șură	['ʂurə]	'barn'	Apical. See Romanian phonology
Romanian	Transylvanian dialects	șură	['ʂurə]	'barn'	Apical. See Romanian phonology
Russian		шут / šut	[ʂut̪]	'jester'	See Russian phonology
Scottish Gaelic	Lewis	ceart	[kʲʰäʂʈ]	'right'	Representation of the phoneme combination /rˠs̪/.
Scottish Gaelic	Harris	ceart	[kʲʰäʂt̪]	'right'	Representation of the phoneme combination /rˠs̪/.
Scottish Gaelic	North Uist and Benbecula	ceart	[kʲʰæʂt̪]	'right'	Representation of the phoneme combination /rˠs̪/.
Scottish Gaelic	Skye	ceart	[kʲʰæʂt̪]	'right'	Representation of the phoneme combination /rˠs̪/.
Serbo-Croatian		šal / шал	[ʂâ̠ːl]	'scarf'	Typically transcribed as /ʃ/. See Serbo-Croatian phonology
Slovak		šatka	[ˈʂätkä]	'kerchief'	
Swedish		fors	[ˈfɔʂː]	'rapids'	Allophone of the sequence /rs/ in many dialects, including Central Standard Swedish. See Swedish phonology
Tamil		கஷ்டம் / kaṣṭam	[kɐʂʈɐm]	'difficult'	Only occurs in loanwords, often replaced with /s/. See Tamil phonology
Telugu		కష్టం / kaṣṭam	[kɐʂʈɐm]	'difficult'	Only occurs in loanwords. See Telugu phonology
Toda		[pɔʂ]		'(clan name)'	Subapical, contrasts /θ s̪ s̠ ʃ ʒ ʂ ʐ/.
Torwali		ݜیݜ / šeš	[ʂeʂ]	'thin rope'	
Ubykh			[ʂ̺a]	'head'	See Ubykh phonology
Ukrainian		шахи / šahy	[ˈʂɑxɪ]	'chess'	See Ukrainian phonology
Upper Sorbian	Some dialects		—	—	Used in dialects spoken in villages north of Hoyerswerda; corresponds to [ʃ] in standard language.
Vietnamese	Southern dialects	sữa	[ʂɨə˧ˀ˥]	'milk'	See Vietnamese phonology
Yi		ꏂ / shy	[ʂ̺ɹ̩˧]	'gold'	
Yurok		segep	[ʂɛɣep]	'coyote'	
Zapotec	Tilquiapan		—	—	Allophone of /ʃ/ before [a] and [u].

== Voiceless retroflex non-sibilant fricative ==
Voiceless retroflex non-sibilant fricative

ɻ̊˔

ʈ˕
- IPA number: 152 402B 429

Audio sample
- source · help

Encoding
- X-SAMPA: r\`_0_r

=== Features ===
Features of a voiceless retroflex non-sibilant fricative:

- Its manner of articulation is fricative, which means it is produced by constricting air flow through a narrow channel at the place of articulation, causing turbulence.
- Its place of articulation is retroflex, which prototypically means it is articulated subapical (with the tip of the tongue curled up), but more generally, it means that it is postalveolar without being palatalized. That is, besides the prototypical subapical articulation, the tongue can be apical (pointed) or, in some fricatives, laminal (flat).
- Its phonation is voiceless, which means it is produced without vibrations of the vocal cords. In some languages the vocal cords are actively separated, so it is always voiceless; in others the cords are lax, so that it may take on the voicing of adjacent sounds.
- It is an oral consonant, which means that air is not allowed to escape through the nose.
- It is a median consonant, which means it is produced by directing the airstream down the midline of the tongue, rather than to the sides.
- Its airstream mechanism is pulmonic, which means it is articulated by pushing air only with the intercostal muscles and abdominal muscles, as in most speech sounds.

=== Occurrence ===
Language		Word	IPA	Meaning	Notes
Ormuri	Kaniguram dialect	suř	[suɻ̝̊]	'red'	Usually corresponds to /ʃ/ in the Logar dialect.

=== Voiceless retroflex approximant ===
Voiceless retroflex approximant

ɻ̊
- IPA number: 152 402A

Encoding
- X-SAMPA: r\`_0

Some scholars also posit the voiceless retroflex approximant distinct from the fricative. The approximant may be represented in the IPA as ⟨ɻ̊⟩.

Language	Word	IPA	Meaning	Notes
Angami	ɻ̥ə³	[ɻ̥ə˨]	'to plan'	Contrasts with /ɻ/
Chokri	[təɻ̥ɨ˥˧]		'sew'	In free variation with /χ/; contrasts with /ɻ/
Faroese	bert	[pɛɻ̊ʈ]	'only'	Devoiced approximant allophone of /r/. See Faroese phonology

== See also ==
- Index of phonetics articles
- Voiced retroflex fricative

== Notes ==
Place →	Labial					Coronal										Dorsal					Laryngeal			
Manner ↓	Bilabial		Labiodental		Linguolabial		Dental		Alveolar		Postalveolar		Retroflex		(Alveolo-)palatal		Velar		Uvular		Pharyngeal/epiglottal		Glottal	
Nasal	m̥	m	ɱ̊	ɱ		n̼	n̪̊	n̪	n̥	n	n̠̊	n̠	ɳ̊	ɳ	ɲ̊	ɲ	ŋ̊	ŋ	ɴ̥	ɴ				
Plosive	p	b	p̪	b̪	t̼	d̼	t̪	d̪	t	d			ʈ	ɖ	c	ɟ	k	ɡ	q	ɢ	ʡ		ʔ	
Sibilant affricate							t̪s̪	d̪z̪	ts	dz	t̠ʃ	d̠ʒ	tʂ	dʐ	tɕ	dʑ								
Non-sibilant affricate	pɸ	bβ	p̪f	b̪v			t̪θ	d̪ð	tɹ̝̊	dɹ̝	t̠ɹ̠̊˔	d̠ɹ̠˔			cç	ɟʝ	kx	ɡɣ	qχ	ɢʁ	ʡʜ	ʡʢ	ʔh	
Sibilant fricative							s̪	z̪	s	z	ʃ	ʒ	ʂ	ʐ	ɕ	ʑ								
Non-sibilant fricative	ɸ	β	f	v	θ̼	ð̼	θ	ð	θ̠	ð̠	ɹ̠̊˔	ɹ̠˔	ɻ̊˔	ɻ˔	ç	ʝ	x	ɣ	χ	ʁ	ħ	ʕ	h	ɦ
Approximant		β̞		ʋ				ð̞		ɹ		ɹ̠		ɻ		j		ɰ						˷
Tap/flap		ⱱ̟		ⱱ					ɾ̥	ɾ			ɽ̊	ɽ						ɢ̆		ʡ̆		
Trill	ʙ̥	ʙ							r̥	r		r̠	ɽ̊r̥	ɽr					ʀ̥	ʀ	ʜ	ʢ		
Lateral affricate									tɬ	dɮ			tꞎ	d𝼅	c𝼆	ɟʎ̝	k𝼄	ɡʟ̝						
Lateral fricative							ɬ̪		ɬ	ɮ			ꞎ	𝼅	𝼆	ʎ̝	𝼄	ʟ̝						
Lateral approximant								l̪	l̥	l		l̠	ɭ̊	ɭ	ʎ̥	ʎ	ʟ̥	ʟ		ʟ̠				
Lateral tap/flap									ɺ̥	ɺ			𝼈̊	𝼈		ʎ̆		ʟ̆						

		BL	LD	D	A	PA	RF	P	V	U
Implosive	Voiced	ɓ			ɗ		ᶑ	ʄ	ɠ	ʛ
Implosive	Voiceless	ɓ̥			ɗ̥		ᶑ̊	ʄ̊	ɠ̊	ʛ̥
Ejective	Stop	pʼ			tʼ		ʈʼ	cʼ	kʼ	qʼ
Ejective	Affricate		p̪fʼ	tθʼ	tsʼ	tʃʼ	tʂʼ	tɕʼ	kxʼ	qχʼ
Ejective	Fricative	ɸʼ	fʼ	θʼ	sʼ	ʃʼ	ʂʼ	ɕʼ	xʼ	χʼ
Ejective	Lateral affricate				tɬʼ			c𝼆ʼ	k𝼄ʼ	q𝼄ʼ
Ejective	Lateral fricative				ɬʼ					
Click (top: velar; bottom: uvular)	Tenuis	kʘ qʘ		kǀ qǀ	kǃ qǃ		k𝼊 q𝼊	kǂ qǂ		
Click (top: velar; bottom: uvular)	Voiced	ɡʘ ɢʘ		ɡǀ ɢǀ	ɡǃ ɢǃ		ɡ𝼊 ɢ𝼊	ɡǂ ɢǂ		
Click (top: velar; bottom: uvular)	Nasal	ŋʘ ɴʘ		ŋǀ ɴǀ	ŋǃ ɴǃ		ŋ𝼊 ɴ𝼊	ŋǂ ɴǂ	ʞ	
Click (top: velar; bottom: uvular)	Tenuis lateral				kǁ qǁ					
Click (top: velar; bottom: uvular)	Voiced lateral				ɡǁ ɢǁ					
Click (top: velar; bottom: uvular)	Nasal lateral				ŋǁ ɴǁ					
