= Kyrgyz phonology =

This article is about the phonology and phonetics of the Kyrgyz language.

== Vowels ==
A formant chart showing the stem vowel space of Kyrgyz. From Washington (2007:10).

Kyrgyz vowel phonemes
	Front		Back	
	unrounded	rounded	unrounded	rounded
Close	i	y yː	ɯ	u uː
Open	e eː (a)	ø øː	ɑ ɑː	o oː

- Notes on vowel quality:
  - Kyrgyz vowel space is different in affixes and stems. Washington (2007) describes the former as more typical and more condensed.
  - In stem vowel space, the main difference between /e/ and /i/ is that the latter is more back. In affix vowel space, they can have the same backness, and differ by height.
- /a/ appears only in borrowings from Persian and is excluded from normal vowel harmony rules. In most dialects, its status as a vowel distinct from /ɑ/ is questionable. There is also a phonetic [a] which appears as a result of regressive assimilation of /ɑ/ before syllables with phonological front vowels, e.g. aydöş [àjd̪ø̞ʃ] 'sloping'.
- /i, y, u, e, ø, o/ are sometimes transcribed /ɪ, ʏ, ʊ, ɛ, œ, ɔ/.
- The sequence of any vowel and the consonant /z/ is pronounced as a long vowel with falling pitch.
- In colloquial speech, word-final vowels are dropped when the next word begins with a vowel.
- All vowels but /i/ and /ɯ/ may be both short and long. Long vowels are the result of historical elisions (e.g. compensatory lengthening) and contractions. For example, jaa 'rain' < *yağ; bee 'mare' (cf. Kazakh bie); too 'mountain' < *tağ; döölöt 'wealth' < Arabic dawlat; uluu 'great' < *uluğ; elüü 'fifty' < *ellig.

== Consonants ==
Kyrgyz consonant phonemes
		Labial	Dental/ alveolar	Post- alveolar	Dorsal
Nasal		m	n		ŋ
Plosive	voiceless	p	t		k
Plosive	voiced	b	d		ɡ
Affricate	voiceless		(t͡s)	t͡ʃ	
Affricate	voiced			d͡ʒ	
Fricative	voiceless	(f)	s	ʃ	(x)
Fricative	voiced	(v)	z		
Approximant			l		j
Trill			r		

- /n, l, r/ are alveolar, whereas /t, d, t͡s, s, z/ are dental.
  - the liquid /l/ is velarized [ɫ] in back vowel contexts.
- /ŋ, k, ɡ, x/ are velar, whereas /j/ is palatal.
  - /k, ɡ/ are palatal [c, ɟ] in words with front vowels, and uvular [q, ʁ] in words with back vowels.
    - Word-initial /k/ is often voiced to [g].
    - In loanwords from Persian and Arabic, palatal [c, ɟ] are always followed by front vowels, whereas velar [k, ɡ] are always followed by back vowels, regardless of the vowel harmony.
    - Word-final and word-initial /k/ is voiced to [ɡ] when it is surrounded by vowels or the consonants /m, n, ŋ, l, r, j/.
- /f, v, t͡s, x/ occur only in foreign borrowings, mostly from Indo-European and Afroasiatic languages.
- Syllable-initial voiceless stops /p, t, tʃ, k/ is usually aspirated.
- In colloquial speech:
  - /b/ is lenited to [w] after /l, r, j/ or between vowels.
  - /t͡ʃ/ sometimes is deaffricated to [ʃ] before voiceless consonants.
  - Intervocalic /s/ can be voiced to [z].
  - Word-final /z/ is often devoiced to [s].

== Stress ==
Stress is usually always put on the last vowel, although some morphemes don't take stress, resulting in non-final stress in some conjugations. Recent loanwords often retain their original stress.

== Desonorisation and devoicing ==
In Kyrgyz, suffixes beginning with /n/ show desonorisation of /n/ to [d] after consonants (including /j/), and devoicing to [t] after voiceless consonants; e.g. the definite accusative suffix -NI patterns like this: kemeñi ('the boat'), aydı ('the month'), tordu ('the net'), koldu ('the hand'), tañdı ('the dawn'), közdü ('the eye'), baştı ('the head').

Suffixes beginning with /l/ also show desonorisation and devoicing, though only after consonants of equal or lower sonority than /l/, e.g. the plural suffix -LAr patterns like this: kemeler ('boats'), aylar ('months'), torlor ('nets'), koldor ('hands'), tañdar ('dawns'), közdör ('eyes'), baştar ('heads'). Other /l/-initial suffixes, such as -LA, a denominal verbal suffix, and -LÚ, a denominal adjectival suffix, may surface either with /l/ or /d/ after /r/; e.g. tordo-/torlo- ('to net/weave'), türdüü/türlüü ('various').

See Kyrgyz language#Case for more examples.

== Bibliography ==
- Kara, Dávid Somfai (2003), Kyrgyz, Lincom Europa, ISBN 3895868434
- Washington, Jonathan North (2006a), An Investigation of Kyrgyz Rounding Harmony (PDF)
- Washington, Jonathan North (2006b), Root Vowels and Affix Vowels: Height Effects in Kyrgyz Vowel Harmony (PDF), archived from the original (PDF) on 2007-01-13
- Washington, Jonathan North (2006c), Where Turkic stress falls: Challenging final-stress analyses in Kazakh and Kyrgyz (PDF)
- Washington, Jonathan North (2007), Phonetic and Phonological Problems in Kyrgyz: A Fulbrighter's plans for gathering data in the field (PDF), archived from the original (PDF) on 2016-01-13
