= BGN/PCGN romanization of Burmese =

The BGN/PCGN romanization of Burmese is based on the 1907 version of the Tables for the Transliteration of Burmese into English, published in 1908 by the Office of the Superintendent, Government Printing, Rangoon, Burma. This system was adopted by the British government during colonial rule, to transcribe place names in Burma. The system does not distinguish aspirated and unaspirated consonants.

== Consonant characters ==
№	IPA	Burmese	Romanization
1	/k/, /kʰ/	က၊ ခ	k-
2	/g/	ဂ၊ ဃ	g-
3	/ŋ/	င	ng-
4	/s/, /sʰ/	စ၊ ဆ	s-
5	/z/	ဇ၊ ဈ	z-
6	/ɲ/	ည	ny-
7	/t/, /tʰ/	ဋ၊ တ၊ ဌ၊ ထ	t-
8	/d/	ဍ၊ ဎ၊ ဒ၊ ဓ	d-
9	/n/	ဏ၊ န	n-
10	/p/, /pʰ/	ပ၊ ဖ	p-
11	/b/	ဗ၊ ဘ	b-
12	/m/	မ	m-
13	/j/	ယ၊ ရ	y-
14	/l/	လ၊ ဠ	l-
15	/w/	ဝ	w-
16	/θ/, /ð/	သ	th-
17	/h/	ဟ	h-
18	/a/	အ	a-

== Consonant character combinations ==
№	Burmese	Romanization
1	မြ၊ မျ	My-
2	မွ	Mw-
3	မြွ၊ မျွ	Myw-
4	မှ	hM-
5	ခြ၊ ချ	ch-
6	ရှ၊ သျှ၊ လျှ	sh-

== Vowel characters ==
№	Independent	Romanization	Dependent	Romanization
1			အာ	a
2	ဧ	e	အေ	e
3			အဲ အယ်	è
4	ဣ ဤ	i	အိ အီ	i
5			အို	o
6	ဥ ဦ	u	အု အူ	u
7	ဩ ဪ	aw	အော အော်	aw
