= Burmese phonology =

Sounds and pronunciation of the Burmese language

The phonology of Burmese is fairly typical of a Southeast Asian language, involving phonemic tone or register, a contrast between major and minor syllables, and strict limitations on consonant clusters.

== Consonants ==
Burmese has 34 consonant phonemes. Stops and affricates make a three-way contrast with voiced, voiceless, and voiceless aspirated. A two-way voicing contrast is also present with nasals and all approximants except for /j/.

Consonant phonemes
		Bilabial	Dental	Alveolar	Post-al. /Palatal	Velar	Laryngeal
Nasal	voiced	m		n	ɲ	ŋ	
Nasal	voiceless^{1}	m̥		n̥	ɲ̊	ŋ̊	
Plosive/ Affricate	voiced	b		d	dʒ	ɡ	
Plosive/ Affricate	voiceless	p		t	tʃ	k	ʔ
Plosive/ Affricate	aspirated	pʰ		tʰ	tʃʰ	kʰ	
Fricative	voiced		ð	z			
Fricative	voiceless		θ^{2}	s	ʃ		
Fricative	aspirated			sʰ^{3}			h
Approximant	voiced			l	j^{4}	w	
Approximant	voiceless^{1}			l̥		ʍ^{5}	

Phonetic notes:

^1The voicelessness of sonorants is not always perceptible.
^2⟨သ⟩, which was */s/ in Pali and OB, but was shifted forward by the shift of ⟨စ⟩ */ts/→/s/, is often transliterated as ⟨s⟩ and transcribed /θ/ in MSB but its actual pronunciation is closer to [ɾ̪ʰ~ɾ̪θ~tθ̆], a dental flap, often accompanied by aspiration or a slight dental fricative, although it can also be voiced. It has a short release generated by moving the tongue back sharply from an interdental position, and will sound to English speakers like a short dental fricative combined with elements of a tap or stop. [ð] is the voiced allophone of ⟨သ⟩ and is not itself a phoneme. These are also pronounced as dental /t̪/, [d̪], and thus prone to merger with alveolar /t, d/.
^3/sʰ/ is a complex phoneme to define. It is a reflex of the earlier /tʃʰ/ and then /tsʰ/ consonants. It is still distinguished from /s/, although it is not so much aspirated as pronounced breathy, and imparts a slight breathy quality to the following vowel making [s̤] a more accurate transcription. Nonetheless, it is prone to merger with /s/.
^4/j/ is often realised as [ʝ], particularly word initially.
^5/ʍ/ is rare, having disappeared from modern Burmese, except in transcriptions of foreign names and a handful of native words.

An additional rare /ɹ/ occurs, but this only appears in toponyms and personal names that have retained Sanskrit or Pali pronunciations (such as Amarapura, pronounced [əməɹa̰pùɹa̰]) and in English-derived words. Historically, /ɹ/ became /j/ in Burmese, and is usually replaced by /j/ in Pāli loanwords, e.g. ရဟန္တာ ra.hanta [jəhàndà] ('monk'), ရာဇ raja. [jàza̰] ('king'). Occasionally it is replaced with /l/ (e.g., တိရစ္ဆာန် ti.rac hcan 'animal'), pronounced [təɹeɪʔ sʰã̀] or [təleɪʔ sʰã̀].

=== Medials and palatalisation ===
Burmese permits the palatalisation of certain consonants. Besides [u̯], which is often erroneously treated as a medial [w] (see vowels), Burmese only permits the palatal medial. This is derived from Old Burmese */-j-/ */-l-/ and */-ɹ-/, and is, therefore, reflected in various ways in different dialects. In MSB orthography, two spellings exist for the medial (demonstrated on the consonant ⟨က⟩ /k/), one reflecting an original /-j-/ (⟨ကျ⟩ - /kj/), and one an original /-ɹ-/ (⟨ကြ⟩ - /kɹ/). Official government romanisation still reflects this fact, as Myanmar, in official romanisation is rendered mran-ma.

The letter ⟨လ⟩ represents /l/ in initial position, but as a medial, it has completely merged with /j/ and /ɹ/. In OB inscriptions, this medial could be rendered with a subscript or "stacked" ⟨လ⟩ as in ⟨က္လ⟩, a practice still used in some dialects, such as Tavoyan/Dawei where medial /l/ is still pronounced distinctly. Although the palatalisation of the labials is simple /m pʰ p b/ → [mʲ pç pʲ bʲ], and the velar nasal predictably palatalises into a palatal nasal /ŋ/ → [n̠ʲ]. The palatalisation of /l/ leads, ostensibly to [lʲ]; however, it often causes vowel raising or breaking, and may remain unchanged before /i/. The velar stops /kʰ k ɡ/ palatalise into [tʃʰ tʃ dʒ].

The alveolars /n tʰ t d/ and historical palatals /ɲ̊ sʰ s z/ cannot be followed by medials except in loan words, but even this is rare. Indeed, the letter *jʰ ⟨ဈ⟩ [z, sʰ] is almost indistinguishable from the s+y sequence ⟨စျ⟩ and many combinations of alveolar+medial will render poorly in certain font sets which were not designed to handle non-native combined graphs.

=== The homorganic nasal and glottal stop ===
Only two consonants can occur word finally in native vocabulary: the homorganic or placeless nasal, and the homorganic or glottal stop. These bear some similarities to the Japanese moraic nasal ん and moraic obstruent sokuon っ.

The glottal stop /ʔ/ is the realisation of all four possible final consonants: ⟨ပ်⟩ /p/, ⟨တ်⟩ /t/, ⟨စ်⟩ /s/, ⟨က်⟩ /k/, and the retroflex ⟨ဋ်⟩ /ʈ/ found in loan words. It has the effect of shortening the vowel and precluding it from bearing tone. This itself is often referred to as the "checked" or "entering" tone, following Chinese nomenclature. It can be realised as a geminate of a following stop, although this is purely allophonic and optional as the difference between the sequence /VʔtV/ and /VtːV/ is only in the catch, and thus barely audible. The primary indicator of this final is the impact on the vowel.

The final nasal /ɰ̃/ is the value of the four native final nasals: ⟨မ်⟩ /m/, ⟨န်⟩ /n/, ⟨ဉ်⟩ /ɲ/, ⟨င်⟩ /ŋ/, as well as the retroflex ⟨ဏ⟩ /ɳ/ (used in Pali loans) and nasalisation mark anusvara demonstrated here above ka (က → ကံ) which most often stands in for a homorganic nasal word medially as in တံခါး tankhá ('door', and တံတား tantá ('bridge') or else replaces final -m ⟨မ်⟩ in both Pali and native vocabulary, especially after the OB vowel *u e.g. ငံ ngam ('salty'), သုံး thóum ('three; use'), and ဆုံး sóum ('end'). It does not, however, apply to ⟨ည်⟩ which is never realised as a nasal, but rather as an open front vowel [iː] [eː] or [ɛː]. The final nasal is usually realised as nasalisation of the vowel. It may also allophonically appear as a homorganic nasal before stops. For example, in /mòʊɰ̃dáɪɰ̃/ ('storm'), which is pronounced [mõ̀ũndã́ĩ].

=== Series of stops ===
Burmese orthography follows similar conventions to that of other Brahmic scripts and can perfectly transcribe words from Pali, an Indic language. As a result, the Burmese script uses far more symbols than Burmese needs for its phonemic inventory.

Besides the set of retroflex consonants ⟨ဌ⟩ /ʈʰ/, ⟨ဋ⟩ /ʈ/, ⟨ဍ⟩ /ɖ/, ⟨ဎ⟩ /ɖʰ/, ⟨ဏ⟩ /ɳ/, and ⟨ဠ⟩ /ɭ/, which are pronounced as alveolar in Burmese, all stops come in sets of four: voiceless aspirated, voiceless, voiced, and voiced aspirated or murmured. The first set ⟨ဖ⟩ /pʰ/, ⟨ထ⟩ /tʰ/, ⟨ဆ⟩ /sʰ/, and ⟨ခ⟩ /kʰ/, as well as the second set ⟨ပ⟩ /p/, ⟨တ⟩ /t/, ⟨စ⟩ /s/, and ⟨က⟩ /k/ are commonly used in Burmese. The voiced set ⟨ဗ⟩ /b/, ⟨ဒ⟩ /d/, ⟨ဇ⟩ /z/, and ⟨ဂ⟩ /ɡ/ are used in Burmese, but sparingly. They are frequently seen in loans from Pali. It may be possible to say that they exist only in loans; however, some of the words they appear in are so old and deeply integrated into the language that the three-way voicing/aspiration distinction can still be said to be an important part of the language.

The final set ⟨ဘ⟩ /bʰ/, ⟨ဓ⟩ /dʰ/, ⟨ဈ⟩ /zʰ/, and ⟨ဃ⟩ /ɡʰ/ is exceedingly rare. They are generally pronounced as voiced [b d z ɡ] or, when following a syllable final stop, aspirated [pʰ tʰ sʰ kʰ]. The most common by far is ⟨ဘ⟩ used in the negative indicative verb particle ဘူး bhú [búː] or [pʰúː], and also in some common loans. Indeed, ⟨ဘ⟩ can be said to be the "default" spelling of /b/ in Burmese for loans while ⟨ဗ⟩ is restricted to older loans.

=== Burmese voicing sandhi ===
Burmese exhibits consonant mutation in the form of voicing sandhi. Speakers from Yangon and Upper Myanmar exhibit more consistent use of voicing sandhi and assimilation than speakers from peripheral regions, though local and individual variation exists. In Arakanese (Rakhine), voicing is limited to plain initials, while it is entirely absent in the Intha dialect. Traditionally, voiceless unaspirated stops became voiced stops, which at first, was allophonic. However, due to the influx of phonemic voiced stops from loan words, and owing to the extension of sandhi to voiceless aspirated stops as well – a feature which does not affect more conservative dialects – sandhi has become an important part of Burmese phonology and word building. In brief, the following shifts can occur in MSB:

Original consonant	1st stage of voicing	2nd stage of voicing
/kʰ, k/	/ɡ/	/Ø/
/tʃʰ, tʃ/	/dʒ/ → /j/	—
/sʰ, s/	/z/	—
/tʰ, t/	/d/	/ɾ/
/pʰ, p/	/b/ → /β/ → /m/	/Ø/
/θ/	/ð/	—
ŋ̊	/ŋʱ/	—
n̥	/nʱ/	—
m̥	/mʱ/	—
ɲ̊	/ɲʱ/	—

Third stages and onwards only affect morphemes and not lexical words, and null is distinct from the glottal stop (/θṵɡò/ [θṵò] 'him, her' vs. /θṵ ʔó/ 'his/her pot'). Additionally ⟨သ⟩ can become voiced under the same conditions, however this is purely allophonic since the voiced [ɾ̪~ð̆~d̪̆] phone does not exist in any other context. Voicing also occurs in the pronunciation of Burmese numerals and classifiers. Some commonly used grammatical markers like ⟨တယ်⟩ ([tɛ] → [dɛ] → [ɾɛ]) and ⟨ဘူး⟩ ([bù] → [ù]) also undergo the 2nd stage of voicing.

Sandhi can occur in two environments. In the first environment, consonants become voiced between vowels or after nasals. This is similar to rendaku in Japanese. This therefore, can affect any consonant except the first consonant of the phrase or a consonant preceded by a stop.

e.g. 'hot water': [jèbù] ရေပူ ← /jè/ + /pù/

The second environment occurs around reduced syllables (see reduction for more). When a syllable becomes reduced, the vowel and any final consonants are reduced to a short schwa [ə̆]. Reduction cannot occur in the final syllable of a word. When a syllable becomes reduced, if both the consonant preceding and following the schwa – i.e. the consonant of the reduced syllable and the consonant of the following syllable – are stops, then both will be voiced:

e.g. 'promise': [ɡədḭ] ကတိ ← /ka̰/ + /tḭ/

In some compound works, the phoneme /dʒ/, when following the nasalized final /ɰ̃/, can shift to a /j/ sound:

e.g. 'blouse' (အင်္ကျီ angkyi) - /èɪɰ̃dʒí/ → [èɪ̃jí].

The phonemes /p, pʰ, b, t, tʰ, d/, when following the nasalized final /ɰ̃/, can become /m/ in compound words:

e.g. 'to consult' တိုင်ပင် - /tàɪɰ̃ pɪ̀ɰ̃/ → [tàɪm mɪ̃̀]
e.g. 'to apologize' တောင်းပန် - /táʊɰ̃ pàɰ̃/ → [táʊm mã̀]
e.g. 'airplane' လေယာဉ်ပျံ - /lè jɪ̀ɰ̃ pjàɰ̃/ → [lèɪm mjã̀]

=== Aspiration and devoicing ===
Although Burmese natively contrasts unaspirated and aspirated stops, there is an additional devoicing/aspirating feature. In OB, h- or a syllable beginning with /h/ could be prefixed to roots, merging over time with the consonant of the following syllable. In the case of the unaspirated stops, these are replaced with the aspirated letter, however words beginning with ⟨မ⟩ /m/ ⟨န⟩ /n/ ⟨ည⟩ /ɲ/ ⟨င⟩ /ŋ/ ⟨လ⟩ /l/ ⟨ရ⟩ /j/ ⟨ယ⟩ /j/ ⟨ဝ⟩ /w/ use a subscript diacritic called ha-to to indicate devoicing: ⟨မှ နှ ညှ ငှ လှ ရှ ယှ ဝှ⟩ /m̥ n̥ ɲ̊ ŋ̊ l̥ ʃ ʃ ʍ/, although as noted above, /ʍ/ is incredibly rare. Devoicing in Burmese is not strong, particularly not on nasals. The sequence /n̥a/ is pronounced closer to [n̤a̤] than [n̥na] and is more noticeable in its tone raising effects.

In many Burmese verbs, pre-aspiration and post-aspiration distinguishes the causative and non-causative forms of verbs, where the aspirated initial consonant indicates active voice or a transitive verb, while an unaspirated initial consonant indicates passive voice or an intransitive verb:

e.g. 'to cook' [tʃʰɛʔ], ချက် vs. 'to be cooked' [tʃɛʔ], ကျက်
e.g. 'to loosen/answer' [pʰjè], ဖြေ vs. 'to be loosened' [pjè], ပြေ
e.g. 'to elevate' [m̥jɪ̰̃], မြှင့် vs. 'to be elevated' [mjɪ̰̃], မြင့်

== Vowels ==
The vowels of Burmese are:

Vowel phonemes
	Front		Central		Back	
	oral	nasal	oral	nasal	oral	nasal
Close	i	ĩ			u	ũ
Close-mid	e		ə		o	
Open-mid	ɛ		ə		ɔ	
Open			a	ã		

In addition to the above monophthongs, Burmese also has nasal and oral diphthongs: /ai/ /au/ /ei/ /ou/ /ãĩ/ /ãũ/ /ẽĩ/ /õũ/. There is debate on the phonemicity of some of the above vowels. For example, Chang (2003) argues that [ɛ] is an allophone of /e/ in closed syllables (those with a syllable coda) and [ə] is a reduced allophone of other vowels. The monophthongs /e/, /o/, /ə/, /ɛ/ and /ɔ/ occur only in open syllables (those without a syllable coda); the diphthongs /ai/, and /au/ occur only in closed syllables. [ə] only occurs in a minor syllable, and is the only vowel that is permitted in a minor syllable (see below).

The close vowels /i/ and /u/ and the close portions of the diphthongs are somewhat mid-centralized ([ɪ, ʊ]) in closed syllables, i.e. before /ɰ̃/ and /ʔ/. Thus နှစ် /n̥iʔ/ ('two') is phonetically [n̥ɪʔ] and ကြောင် /tʃàuɰ̃/ ('cat') is phonetically [tʃàʊɰ̃].

Although this analysis is (more or less) correct from a purely phonetic point of view, it hides the diachronic nature of Burmese vowel development and mergers, and obfuscates the reasoning behind Burmese orthography.

=== Vowels in open syllables ===
Synchronically, there can be said to be a total of ten vowels in Modern Standard Burmese (MSB) open syllables: /a u̯a ɛ u̯ɛ e u̯e i ɔ o u/. Although the vowels /u̯a/, /u̯ɛ/, and /u̯e/ are commonly treated as medial-vowel sequences, reducing the vowel inventory of MSB in open syllables from ten to seven, the behaviour of /u̯a/, /u̯ɛ/, and /u̯e/ is unlike that of glide-vowel combinations (See the section on glides below for a more complete explanation).

Diachronically, however, all of the MSB open syllable vowels are derived from Old Burmese (OB) open syllables or diphthongs. The four vowels of OB were */*a *i *o *u/. Early in the development of Burmese /*o/ broke to form /*u̯a/. Additionally, any vowel could be followed by either of two glides: */j/ and */w/. The diphthongs resulting from these glides were considered to be closed syllables in OB and as such, could not be followed by any other consonant. However, in MSB, all OB diphthongs have become monophthongs and are thus phonetically viewed as open syllables.

The following table shows the origins of MSB open vowels. The IPA is followed by the phoneme demonstrated in Burmese script on the consonant ⟨ပ⟩ /p/ showing (top to bottom) creaky tone, low tone, and high tone.

Outcomes of OB vowel + final combinations (Open Syllables)
OB final	OB vowel							
OB final	*a		*o		*i		*u	
*Ø	/a/	ပ	/u̯a/	ပွ	/i/	ပိ	/u/	ပု
*Ø	/a/	ပါ	/u̯a/	ပွါ	/i/	ပီ	/u/	ပူ
*Ø	/a/	ပါး	/u̯a/	ပွါး	/i/	ပီး	/u/	ပူး
*y	/ɛ/	ပဲ့	/u̯ɛ/	ပွဲ့	/e/	ပေ့	/u̯e/	ပွေ့
*y	/ɛ/	ပယ်	/u̯ɛ/	ပွယ်	/e/	ပေ	/u̯e/	ပွေ
*y	/ɛ/	ပဲ	/u̯ɛ/	ပွဲ	/e/	ပေး	/u̯e/	ပွေး
*w	/ɔ/	ပေါ့					/o/	ပို့
*w	/ɔ/	ပေါ်					/o/	ပို
*w	/ɔ/	ပေါ					/o/	ပိုး

From the table it is clear that the vowels /ɛ/, /u̯ɛ/, /e/, /u̯e/, /ɔ/, and /o/ can only exist in open syllables in MSB (with some rare exceptions) as they derive from vowel+glide combinations.

The /j/ offglide results in the e-class vowels */aj/→/ɛ/, */ij/→/e/, */u̯aj/→/u̯ɛ/, */uj/→/u̯e/ respectively. Note the symmetry with the base vowel system: The closed vowels */i/ and */u/ create the mid-closed vowels /e/ and /u̯e/ while */a/ and */o/ create the mid-open vowels /ɛ/ and /u̯ɛ/. Similarly, the rounded on-glide is a result of a rounded base vowel */u/ or */o/.

Currently, the /w/ offglide is only thought to have existed in */aw/ and */uw/ resulting in the MSB o-class vowels /ɔ/ and /o/ respectively. The absence of */iw/ and */ow/ in reconstructions is something of a mystery, however it is possible that, by analogy with the /j/ offglide, */aw/ */iw/ */ow/ */uw/ all existed, resulting in pairs with or without the rounded on-glide: /ɔ/ /o/ /u̯ɔ/ /u̯o/ which later merged. This may explain why the Burmese orthography indicates the vowel /o/ with both the diacritics for both the /i/ and /u/ vowels and, previously, a following consonantal /w/.

=== Finals ===
MSB recognises 8 finals in native vocabulary which are all distinguished from their initial forms with the c-shaped superscript diacritic asat ⟨ ် ⟩ which for ease of reading, is omitted here: the stops: ပ /p/ တ /t/ စ /c/ က /k/ and the nasals: မ /m/ န /n/ ည / ဉ /ɲ/ င /ŋ/. All of the stops in final position are realised as a glottal stop /ʔ/ (or, potentially, a geminate of a following stop) which shortens the vowel and precludes it from bearing any tone. All of the nasals on the other hand nasalise the vowel but are not pronounced as consonants unless there is a following nasal or stop. Syllables ending on nasals can bear any of the three tones, but rarely have tone 1 (short, high, creaky phonation).

Finals are broadly grouped into two sets: front and back finals. Front finals include the labial and alveolar finals -m -n and -p -t which are not distinguished in MSB, leading to mergers such as အိပ် (*/ip/ 'sleep') and အိတ် (*/it/ 'bag'), both pronounced [ĕɪʔ]. In Tavoyan dialects however, the labial finals -m and -p often cause vowel breaking (*/un/ -> /ũː/, */um/ -> /ãʊ/). The back finals include the palatal finals -c -ɲ and velar -k -ŋ, although their uses are even more complex.

Current reconstruction holds that the OB vowel-offglide sequences – which today are /ɛ/ /u̯ɛ/ /e/ /u̯e/ /ɔ/ /o/ in MSB – counted as a closed syllables and thus could not be followed by a final. As a result, most closed syllables in MSB are built around the 4 basic vowels /a/ /i/ /u̯a/ /u/.

=== Vowels before labial and coronal finals ===
The 4 basic vowels /a/ /i/ /u̯a/ /u/ can all occur before the labial and coronal finals. In MSB before the -p and -t finals they are pronounced /æʔ/ /eɪʔ/ /u̯æʔ~ʊʔ/ /ɔʊʔ/ respectively. Similarly, before the -m and -n finals, vowels use the same qualities except that they are nasalised and are pronounced long by default thus giving: /æ̃/ /ẽɪ/ /u̯æ̃~ʊ̃/ /ɔ̃ʊ/.

The variation between /ʊ̆ʔ/ /ʊ̃ː/ and /u̯æ̆ʔ/ /u̯æ̃ː/ is regional. North-central dialects in and around Mandalay tend to use the original opening diphthong while southern dialects in and around Yangon tend to use the monophthong. Both pronunciations are universally accepted and understood. In more conservative dialects /i/ /u/ and */o/ may not break, and thus remain /ĭʔ/ /ĩ/, /ŭʔ/ /ũ/, and /ɔ̆ʔ/ /ɔ̃/, additionally */an/ may move back, not forward, leaving /ɔ̃/ and not /æ̃/, but all of these features are considered non-standard.

Some exceptions do exist to this rule, however, as even in Yangon Burmese the word စွမ်း (*suám 'to be able to') is pronounced /su̯áːɰ̃/ while ဆွမ်း (*sʰuám 'religious offering of food; mostly cooked rice'), written with the same rime and tone, is pronounced /s(ʰ)ʊ́ːɰ̃/.

In Tavoyan dialects, labial finals are often distinguished from coronal finals by breaking and rounding vowels.

=== Vowels before dorsal finals ===
The velar finals ⟨က⟩ -k and ⟨င⟩ -ŋ can follow the vowels /a/ and /u̯a/ giving အက် /ɐʔ/ အွက် /u̯æʔ/ အင် /ɪ̃/ အွင် /u̯ɪ̃/. The pronunciation of -ak is becoming /æʔ/ in Yangon Burmese, merging with -ap and -at. Older speakers will pronounce the vowel higher and as a front-central vowel in the [ɛ~ɜ] range. The fronting of *a before *ŋ to /ɪ/ is a distinctive feature of MSB, not shared by other varieties of Burmese. Rakhine/Arakhanese dialects shift the /a/ back before both the stop and nasal to become /ɔ̆ʔ/ /ɔ̃ː/. Tavoyan/Dawei dialects merge both the -ap -at -ak rimes (as is becoming common in Yangon) and also merge the -am -an -aŋ rimes allegedly resulting in /ăʔ/ /ãː/, although it is unclear whether these are truly [a] or [æ] as in MSB.

The palatal finals ⟨စ⟩ and ⟨ည / ဉ⟩ occur only with the inherent vowel /a/ and derive from OB *ik and *iŋ. The spelling reflects the shifts of *ik > *ac and *iŋ > aɲ. The final ⟨စ⟩ today is /ɪʔ/. The palatal final, however, has two forms. The form ⟨ဉ⟩ represents /ĩ/ (or /ãɪ/ in Rakhine dialects) as would be expected. The far more common ⟨ည⟩ however has lost its nasal characteristic and is realised variously as /ɛ/ (မည် /mɛ̀/ literary future/irrealis marker, written မယ် in colloquial language), /i/ (ပြည် /pʲì/ 'country' pronounced as ပြီ 'end, finish'), and less often /e/ (ရည် /jè/'juice', pronounced identically to ရေ 'water' however, some people would pronounce ရည် as /jʲì/ which pronounced identically to ရီ). Tavoyan dialects restrict the pronunciation to /ɛ/ exclusively, while Rakhine dialects use /e/.

The rimes */aʊk/ (အောက်) */aʊŋ/ (အောင်) derive from OB *uk and *uŋ breaking to /aʊ/ before a velar final. The change in spelling reflects this sound shift and should not be taken to indicate an OB *awk *awŋ or *ɔk *ɔŋ sequence. In Tavoyan they are realised as /ɔ̆ʔ/ and /ɔ̃ː/ respectively.

The rimes (အိုက်) and (အိုင်) are somewhat problematic from a linguistic perspective. Written with the compound vowel diacritic for /o/ and pronounced /ăɪʔ/ and /ãɪ/ respectively, they are currently believed to represent either loans from foreign languages or from more conservative dialects of Burmese. They do not fit into the normal table of rimes and their shared orthography with the /o/ vowel is coincidental.

=== The closed syllable vowel inventory ===
Just as open syllables have ten vowels, so too do closed syllables: /æ/ /ɪ/ /ɛ~ɜ/ /u̯æ~ʊ/ /u̯ɛ/ /u̯ɪ/ /eɪ/ /oʊ/ /aɪ/ /aʊ/. It is worth noting that in Yangon MSB no vowel quality exists in both closed and open syllables, and that therefore nasalisation and the glottal stop cannot be said to be contrastive features in and of themselves. In fact, with the exception of tone (and its inherent length, intensity, and phonation) no suprasegmental features can really be said to be phonemic.

=== Finals in loans ===
Following the breaking of *u to /aʊ/ before velars and the palatalisation of velars after *i, new vocabulary entered the language with sequences of /i/ or /u/ followed by a velar. Such words are written with the vowel ⟨အိ⟩ or ⟨အု⟩ and followed by the velar final, and are pronounced as though they ended on a labial or coronal final. Thus, လိင် /lèɪɰ̃/ 'sex' is pronounced as လိမ် 'to twist, lie' and သုက် ('semen') is pronounced exactly as သုပ် ('salad') /ɾ̪ɔʊʔ/ (or /θɔʊʔ/ following conventional transcription).

In loan words, usually from Pali, လ /l/ ရ /ɹ~j/ ဝ /w/ သ /s/ are found but are silent and do not affect the vowel, which continues to behave as an open syllable vowel. Also from Pali are the retroflex finals ဋ /ʈ/ and ဏ /ɳ/ which merge with their alveolar counterparts.

The superscript diacritic ⟨ ံ ⟩ anusvara is a convention inherited from Pali. It is used across Brahmic scripts in homorganic nasal+plosive sequences as a shorthand for the nasal (which would otherwise have to carry an asat or form a ligature with the following stop). In Burmese it continues this function as it is found not only in loaned vocabulary but also in native words e.g. သုံး /ɾ̪óʊːɰ̃/ (or /θóʊːɰ̃/) 'three' or 'to use' which derives from proto-Sino-Tibetan *g-sum.

The consonant ⟨ယ⟩ is also seen with an asat diacritic, but this is the standard spelling for the vowel /ɛ/ with tone 2 and is not viewed in any way as a final (although, as noted above, this is an etymologically accurate rendering of /ɛ/ which originated from the *ay sequence).

Finally, loaned vocabulary can also, uniquely, add a final after the vowel /e/. An example of this is the common Pali word မေတ္တာ mettā (but native would most likely to pronounce it /mjɪttā/), from Sanskrit मैत्र maitra. This is exclusively used to transcribe an /e/ vowel in closed syllables in loans, but cannot occur in native vocabulary, although many such loans, particularly from Pali, may be centuries old.

=== Notes on glides ===
Note that, the vocalic onglide /u̯/ is usually transcribed both in phonetic transcription and in romanisation as /w/. This is due to the fact that, phonetically, it behaves as a medial, however, here the transcription /u̯/ is used to emphasise that it is a part of the vowel and not a true medial like /-j-/ (romanised -y-). /-j-/ is derived from OB */-j-/ */-l-/ and */-ɹ-/, and is, therefore, reflected in various ways in different dialects. In MSB orthography two spellings exist for the medial (demonstrated on the consonant က /k/), one reflecting an original /-j-/ (ကျ - ky), and one an original /-ɹ-/ (ကြ - kr) and official government romanisation still reflects this fact (Myanmar, in official romanisation is rendered mran-ma). However, in MSB, */ɹ/, for which there is also a unique initial letter ⟨ရ⟩, is pronounced /j/ in all instances (usually realised as [ʝ] initially) except in loan words for example, ရသ (ratha) however in spoken modern Burmese, most people would likely to pronounce it "jatha". The letter for /l/ ⟨လ⟩ is still pronounced as /l/ in initial position, but as a medial, it has completely merged with /-j-/ and /-ɹ-/. In OB inscriptions this medial could be rendered with a subscript or "stacked" လ as in ⟨က္လ⟩, a practice still used in the rare dialects, such as Tavoyan/Dawe where the /-l-/ medial is still pronounced distinctly. These medials behave differently than the /u̯/ onglide in the following ways:

- a medial */-j-/ */-l-/ */-ɹ-/ can be placed before the on-glide /u̯/, whereas two medials can never be used in the same syllable.
- the use of /u̯/ is restricted by the vowel nucleus (only used with /a/ /ɛ/ /e/) and may in some cases drastically change the pronunciation of the vowel e.g. in Yangon /wa/ before a final becomes [ʊ], while /a/ before a final becomes [æ]. However, it cannot affect the pronunciation of the initial.
- glides are restricted by the preceding initial, and often change its pronunciation. Bearing in mind that MSB does not reliably indicate the development of */-l-/, /m/ /pʰ/ /p/ /b/ can apparently be followed by any glide, in which case the glide becomes [ʲ]. Similarly /kʰ/ /k/ and /g/ can be followed by any glide, in which case the cluster becomes [tʃʰ] [tʃ] or [dʒ] respectively. /ŋ/ can be followed by /-ɹ-/ but not /-j-/ in which case the cluster becomes [ɲ], merging with the palatal nasal letter ⟨ည / ဉ⟩. And finally, /l/ can be followed by /-j-/ but not /-ɹ-/. This is rare and in Yangon MSB this represents the only case where the medial impacts the vowel, whereby the sequence လျာ */ljaː/ is realised [lea̯] and လျင် becomes *lyaŋ > lyiŋ becomes [lɪə̃]. Although there is a lot of variation in the pronunciation of these syllables. Tavoyan front vowels are frequently raised following /-j-/.

In Yangon, Mandalay, Bago MSB, initial /j/ /ɹ/ /w/ and a null initial with /-j-/ /-ɹ-/ /u̯/ are functionally the same; this extends to a /w/ initial followed by a /u̯/ onglide. Therefore, in Yangon (and likely much of MSB) /wa/, /Øu̯a/, and /wu̯a/ are pronounced identically. ကြ (ky) being (kr) is only in Rakhine dialect. For example, မြတ် (Myat) is pronounced as မရတ်(Mrat) in Rakhine dialect.

== Tones ==
Burmese is a tonal language, which means phonemic contrasts can be made on the basis of the tone of a vowel. In Burmese, these contrasts involve not only pitch, but also phonation, intensity (loudness), duration, and vowel quality. However, some linguists consider Burmese a pitch-register language like Shanghainese.

Like most East and South-East Asian languages (notably Chinese), the Burmese tone system developed in the following way:

Syllables ending on a stop (-p, -t, -k) developed a unique tone, called checked or entering tone following Chinese nomenclature (入 rù). Other syllables (i.e. those ending on a nasal, a glide, or no final) are believed to have been able to end on an additional glottal stop [ʔ] and/or be glottalised [ˀ] or alternatively they could end on a fricative, likely either /s/ or /h/. The loss of these final glottal and fricative created the Burmese creaky and high tones respectively. Low tone is the result of syllables which had neither a glottal nor fricative ending.

In this way, The Burmese low, creaky and high tones correspond to the Middle Chinese level (平 píng), rising (上 shǎng), and departing (去 qù) tones respectively, as well as the Vietnamese tone pairs of ngang & huyền, hỏi & ngã, and sắc & nặng respectively.

Creaky tone and high tone both have distinctive phonations—creaky and breathy respectively. They are also notably shorter and longer than low tone respectively.

In the following table, the four tones are shown marked on the vowel /a/ as an example.

Tone	Burmese	Symbol (shown on a)	Phonation	Duration	Intensity	Pitch
Low	နိမ့်သံ	à	normal	medium	low	low, often slightly rising
High	တက်သံ	á	sometimes slightly breathy	long	high	high, often with a fall before a pause
Creaky	သက်သံ	a̰	tense or creaky, sometimes with lax glottal stop	medium	high	high, often slightly falling
Checked	တိုင်သံ	aʔ	centralized vowel quality, final glottal stop	short	high	high (in citation; can vary in context)

For example, the following words are distinguished from each other only on the basis of tone:

- Low ခါ /kʰà/ 'shake'
- High ခါး /kʰá/ 'be bitter/waist'
- Creaky ခ /kʰa̰/ (not a word)
- Checked ခတ် /kʰæʔ/ 'to (wind/air) blow, to wave(hand fans)'

In syllables ending with /ɰ̃/, the checked tone is excluded:

- Low ခံ /kʰæ̀ɰ̃/ 'undergo, passive voice particle'
- High ခန်း /kʰǽɰ̃/ 'dry up'
- Creaky ခန့် /kʰæ̰ɰ̃/ 'appoint, handsome, good looking'

As with many East and South-East Asian languages, the phonation of the initial consonant can trigger a tone split - which explains why pairs of tones in Vietnamese correspond with single Burmese tones, and why languages like Thai, Lao, and Cantonese have significantly more than 4 tones. Although this feature has been historically absent from Burmese, a tone split is underway currently. Sonorants with a ha-to (devoicing mark - see section on consonants) raise the tone of the following vowel. Customarily, this distinction is transcribed with the letter h in romanisation and is explicitly marked on the consonant in Burmese script e.g. မ (ma 'female') vs မှ (hma 'from'). In earlier times this distinction was borne primarily on the consonant in the form of devoicing/murmuring, then later imparted a breathy quality to the vowel itself. More recently this has translated into a general tone raising, even in checked syllables (i.e. those ending on a stop -p -t -k) representing the first time tonal distinctions have occurred in such syllables e.g. မြောက် (*mruk /mʲaʊʔ/ 'north') vs မြှောက် (*hmruk /m̤ʲá̤ʊʔ/ 'to raise'). Consequently, Burmese can be described as having 8 tones. Note that this does not apply to devoiced r ရှ, y ယှ, or ly လျှ as this results in [ʃ] with no breathy phonation. In some dialects, for instance those around Inle Lake, devoiced l လှ results in a voiceless lateral fricative /ɬ/, making tone raising unlikely.

Reduced syllables have the rime [ə̀], which is short and low. This is not considered to be a distinct tone, but rather the absence of distinct tone or rime all together.

In spoken Burmese, some linguists classify two real tones (there are four nominal tones transcribed in written Burmese), "high" (applied to words that terminate with a stop or check, high-rising pitch) and "ordinary" (unchecked and non-glottal words, with falling or lower pitch), with those tones encompassing a variety of pitches. The "ordinary" tone consists of a range of pitches. Linguist L. F. Taylor concluded that "conversational rhythm and euphonic intonation possess importance" not found in related tonal languages and that "its tonal system is now in an advanced state of decay."

== Syllable structure ==
The syllable structure of Burmese is C(G)V((V)C), which is to say the onset consists of a consonant optionally followed by a glide, and the rime consists of a monophthong alone, a monophthong with a consonant, or a diphthong with a consonant. The only consonants that can stand in the coda are /ʔ/ and /ɴ/. Some representative words are:

- CV မယ် /mɛ̀/ 'miss'
- CVC မက် /mɛʔ/ 'crave'
- CGV မြေ /mjè/ 'earth'
- CGVC မျက် /mjɛʔ/ 'eye'
- CVVC မောင် /màʊɰ̃/ (term of address for young men)
- CGVVC မြောင်း /mjáʊɰ̃/ 'ditch'

A minor syllable has some restrictions:

- It contains /ə/ as its only vowel
- It must be an open syllable (no coda consonant)
- It cannot bear tone
- It has only a simple (C) onset (no glide after the consonant)
- It must not be the final syllable of the word

Some examples of words containing minor syllables:

- ခလုတ် /kʰə.loʊʔ/ 'knob/switch'
- ပလွေ /pə.lwè/ 'flute'
- သရော် /θə.jɔ̀/ 'mock'
- ကလက် /kə.lɛʔ/ 'be wanton/be frivolous'
- ထမင်းရည် /tʰə.mə.jè/ '(cooked)rice-water'

== Bibliography ==
- Bradley, David (May 2011). "Changes in Burmese Phonology and Orthography". SEALS Conference. Kasetsart University.
- Chang, Charles B. (2009). "English loanword adaptation in Burmese" (PDF). Journal of the Southeast Asian Linguistics Society. 1: 77–94.
- Cornyn, William Stewart (1944). Outline of Burmese grammar. Baltimore: Linguistic Society of America.
- Cornyn, William Stewart; D. Haigh Roop (1968). Beginning Burmese. New Haven: Yale University Press.
- Cooper, Lisa; Beau Cooper; and Sigrid Lew (2012). "A phonetic description of Burmese obstruents". 45th International Conference on Sino-Tibetan Languages and Linguistics. Nanyang Technological University, Singapore.
- Green, Antony D. (2005). "Word, foot, and syllable structure in Burmese". In J. Watkins (ed.). Studies in Burmese linguistics. Canberra: Pacific Linguistics. pp. 1–25. ISBN 0-85883-559-2.
- Hill, Nathan W. (2012). "Evolution of the Burmese Vowel System" (PDF). Transactions of the Philological Society. 110 (1): 64–79. doi:10.1111/j.1467-968x.2011.01282.x.
- Jenny, Mathias; San San Hnin Tun (2016). Burmese: A Comprehensive Grammar. London and New York: Routledge. ISBN 9781317309314.
- Okell, John (1969). A reference grammar of colloquial Burmese. London: Oxford University Press. ISBN 0-7007-1136-8.
- Okell, John (2002). Burmese By Ear or Essential Myanmar (PDF). London: The School of Oriental and African Studies, University of London. ISBN 978-1-86013-758-7. Archived from the original (PDF) on 2021-04-20.
- Watkins, Justin W. (2001). "Illustrations of the IPA: Burmese" (PDF). Journal of the International Phonetic Association. 31 (2): 291–295. doi:10.1017/S0025100301002122. S2CID 232344700.
