= Battle of Loikaw =

Battle of Loikaw may refer to:

- Battle of Loikaw (2021)
- Battle of Loikaw (2022)

== See also ==
- Operation 1111, an ongoing siege of Loikaw
