= Communist Party (Burma) =

Communist Party (Burma) ကွန်မြူနစ်ပါတီ (ဗမာပြည်)
- Chairman: Thakin Soe
- Founded: February 1946
- Split from: Communist Party of Burma
- Ideology: Communism; Marxism-Leninism
- Political position: Far-left

Party flag

The Communist Party (Burma) (Burmese: ကွန်မြူနစ်ပါတီ (ဗမာပြည်)), sometimes referred to as the Red Flag Communist Party (Burmese: အလံနီကွန်မြူနစ်ပါတီ; RFCP), was a Marxist-Leninist party in Burma. The party was formed after a more radical faction broke away from the Communist Party of Burma in 1946. In the same year, it began a protracted armed insurgency; first against British rule, then against the Burmese government. The party was led by Thakin Soe, a firebrand communist leader. In the 1970s, the party lost influence and was militarily defeated by 1978.

== Split ==
The party emerged from a split in the Communist Party of Burma in February 1946. Thakin Soe, a former guerrilla leader, had staked claims for the leadership of the party. He denounced Thakin Than Tun and Thakin Thein Pe as 'Browderists', charging that the two had taken a compromising stand towards imperialism and opportunistic elements.

The inner-party conflict had erupted after a speech by the AFPFL leader Ba Pe in January 1946. Ba Pe had denounced the political system in the Soviet Union. In response, Thakin Soe labelled Ba Pe 'a tool of the imperialists'. Wary of the risk of the unity of AFPFL, the party leadership initiated a disciplinary process against Thakin Soe. Thakin Soe demanded that control over the Central Committee be handed over to him and his associates. Thakin Than Tun and Thein Pe did commit self-criticism (and temporarily resigned from their posts), but did not agree to Soe's demand to make him the party leader. Soe himself was removed from the Central Committee. In response Soe broke with the Communist Party of Burma and formed the Communist Party (Burma). Thakin Tin Mya and six members of the Communist Party of Burma sided with Thakin Soe's new party.

== Red Flag vs. White Flag ==
The party was labelled the 'Red Flag Communist Party' (as opposed to the 'White Flag Communist Party', i.e. the main Communist Party of Burma) due to the colour of their armbands. Whilst the White Flag Communist Party employed a popular front line of working within the framework of the Anti-Fascist People's Freedom League, the Red Flag Communist Party denounced co-operation with non-communist forces. Instead the party called for direct armed confrontation with the British as a means to achieve independence. The Red Flag Communist Party was significantly smaller than the White Flag Communist Party. Thakin Than Tun described the positions of the Red Flag Communist Party as 'left adventurism'.

== Mass work, ban and insurgency ==
The party began building up Red Flag Cultivators Unions across Burma, a movement that called on peasants to stop paying rents and taxes. In July 1946, the governor of Burma Sir Henry Knight issued a ban on the Red Flag Cultivators Unions and the labour wing of the party, the Red Flag Labour Unions.

The government also declared the Communist Party (Burma) itself an unlawful association on 10 July 1946. The White Flag Communist Party protested that the ban was an infringement on civil liberties.

The party initiated an armed campaign against the British colonial rule and the 'right-wing' elements of the AFPFL in July 1946. Soe was also to recruit some elements from the army to take part in the rebellion.

U Aung San had objected to the ban on the Communist Party (Burma), and ensured that the ban on the party was lifted temporarily in October 1946. He had, however, not associated himself with any public protest against the ban.

In January 1947, the party was again banned. In response, the party went underground. The White Flag Communist Party had again protested against the ban on the Communist Party (Burma). In April 1947, the Communist Party (Burma) called for a boycott of the elections to the Constituent Assembly. By 1948, the armed operations of the party were concentrated in the Irrawaddy delta.

In 1949, the party expelled Thakin Tin Mya. Thakin Tin Mya later re-joined the Communist Party of Burma.

== Arakan insurgency ==
In the Arakan State, the Communist Party (Burma) made an alliance with Rakhine separatist rebels under the leadership of nationalist monk U Seinda. In 1958, U Seinda forces surrendered to the government.

In 1962, the party suffered a setback, as a group of members in Arakan State broke away and formed the Communist Party of Arakan. They were led by Kyaw Zan Rhee, a prominent Arakanese political leader, and Bo Maung Han. The Arakan Communist Party called for independence for Arakan.

== Decline ==
Following the 1956 parliamentary elections, the party, as well as other rebel groups, began to suffer from defections from its armed wing. The strong performance of the National United Front had convinced many left-wing sympathizers that armed rebellion was not the sole path of political struggles. When U Nu launched the 'Arms for Democracy' programme in 1958, several fighters of the party deserted to the government. Many might also have simply returned to their villages quietly. In 1961, the party was estimated to have around 500 fighters.

Thakin Soe participated in the 1963 peace talks with the government.

== Capture of Thakin Soe ==
The armed campaign of the party against both the AFPFL and Burma Socialist Programme Party governments would continue until the capture of Thakin Soe by government forces in 1970. In November 1970, army forces stormed Thakin Soe's hideout and the last stronghold of the party in the northern fringes of the Arakan Yoma mountain range. He was taken to Rangoon and imprisoned. The party almost disappeared after Soe's arrest.

== 1978 annihilation campaign in Arakan ==
In 1978, the forces of the Red Flag Communist Party in Arakan and the Communist Party of Arakan were targets of an annihilation campaign by the Burma Army in the rural areas of the region. The party was forced to retreat to the Bangladesh–Burma border.
