= Red Flag Cultivators Unions =

The Red Flag Cultivators Unions was a peasants movement in Burma, linked to the Red Flag Communist Party and formed after the Red Flag Communist Party had broken away from the Communist Party of Burma. The Red Flag Cultivators Unions called on peasants not to pay rent or taxes.

On 3 July 1946, the British governor of Burma Sir Henry Knight banned the Red Flag Cultivators Unions and the related Red Flag Labour Unions.
