= Bo Saw Aung =

Burmese military officer

Major General Bo Saw Aung ဗိုလ်စောအောင်

Member of the Anti-Fascist People's Freedom League

Personal details
- Born: Ko Ngwe; 28 April 1914 Shansu Village, Kamayut Township, Myanmar
- Died: 26 February 1942 (aged 27)
- Occupation: Politician
- Awards: Independence Mawgunwin (Third Class)
- Nickname: Thakhin Ngwe

Bo Saw Aung (born as Ko Ngwe, 28 April 1914 in Shan State) was a military officer and a member of the legendary "Thirty Comrades" who trained in Japan in the struggle for independence from Britain. He was the first of Thirty Comrades to be killed.

He served in the Burmese National Army (BIA) and participated to fought for the liberation of Burma from British rule.

== Early life and careers ==
On 28 April 1914, he was born in Shansu Village, Kamayut Township, Yangon . His birth name was Ko Ngwe. His younger brother was Bo Saw Naung, one of Thirty Comrades.

In 1934, he joined the Dobama Asiayone and became involved in politics. When he joined it, he took his name as Thakin Ngwe. In 1938, when the Dobama Asiayone split into two factions, he joined the Ba Sein – Tun Oke faction. He was selected to be sent to Japan for military training and received military training in Hainan and Taiwan.

Along with the Burmese Independence Army (BIA), which he included, he fought valiantly against British troops. At 26 February 1942, Saw Aung was killed during an attack on a British military base in Shwegyin.

== Death ==
Bo Saw Aung died in Shwegyin on February 26, 1942.
