= Japan–Myanmar relations =

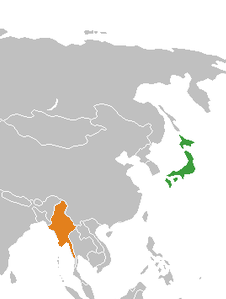
- Japan: Myanmar

Diplomatic mission
- Embassy of Myanmar in Tokyo: Embassy of Japan in Yangon

Japan–Myanmar relations (Note: Known as the Japan–Burma relations prior to 1989.) are the bilateral relations between Japan and the Republic of the Union of Myanmar. The two countries enjoyed good relations after the two country's 1954 peace treaty and World War II reparations agreement. Myanmar and Japan held some of the strongest ties among Asian countries, often called a "special relationship" throughout the socialist period. Japan's influence waned towards the 2000s as an ambivalent power stuck between sanctionists like the United States and new engagers like China. The relationship is charaterised by a measure of sentimental historical attachment, alongside some geopolitical consideration for Japan to counter China's influence in Myanmar. Japan today has retained significant political and economic influence over the Myanmar military in the wake of the 2021 Myanmar coup d'état. Japan has previously condemned the coup and the killing of peaceful protestors.

== History ==
Japan has had contact with Myanmar and other Southeast Asians countries for several centuries. In the 16th century, Japanese were present in nearby Ayutthaya and Manila at the time, including as slaves bought and sold by Portuguese traders. There is evidence of Japanese warriors (Samurai) playing active roles fighting for the Arakanese Kingdom of Mrauk U against the First Toungoo Empire in the early 17th century. According to the tradition of Shan people, many samurai fled from Ayutthaya Kingdom served local kings of Kengtung.

=== Japan and Burmese independence movements ===
U Ottama, one of the central figures in Burma's early independence movement, travelled to Japan in 1907, teaching Pali and Sanskrit at the Academy of Buddhist Science in Tokyo. The Russo-Japanese War in 1904 was a turning point in his life that later inspired his anti-colonial activities. The Japanese naval victory at the Battle of Tsushima in the war saw great attention and prestige in Burmese newspapers at the time.

From the life of U Ottama, many prominent Burmese figures in the anti-colonial and independence movements were involved with Japan. In 1935, Galon U Saw, a future Prime Minister of British Burma, and Nyi Pu, the first film actor in Burmese cinema, visited Japan. They studied the factories, military, film industry and education systems of Japan. U Saw and U Ottama came to believe that Myanmar could only gain independence with Japan's help.

=== Imperial Japan and World War II ===
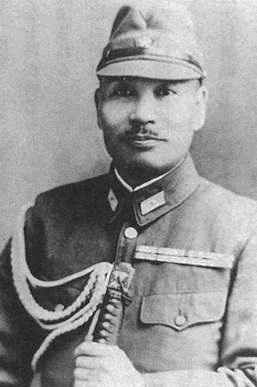
Suzuki Keiji, mentor of the Thirty Comrades

In April 1941, small groups of Burmese youth left Burma secretly to obtain military training to fight the British Colonists in the struggle for independence. They were sent by the Dobama Asiayone to get assistance from the Kuomintang in Guangzhou. However, they ran into the Japanese instead in Amoy and arrived in Japan later to be flown to occupied parts of Sanya, in order to receive military training by the Imperial Japanese Army. They were later moved to Formosa for security reasons and subsequently returned to Burma with the Japanese invasion in 1942. A Japanese officer called Suzuki Keiji, better known among the Burmese by his nom de guerre Bo Mogyo (Commander Thunderbolt) and head of a special intelligence unit called Minami Kikan (南機関) formed in order to support a national uprising in Burma, was the mentor and principal trainer of the Thirty Comrades. Japan's histroical involvement in training the Thirty Comrades is source of sentimental attachment that influenced the two countries' relations into the 21st century.

After the Japanese invasion of Burma, Japan declared the colony independent as the State of Burma on 17 May 1942 with a puppet government led by Ba Maw. However, the soon became apparent that Japanese promises of independence was a sham. As the war turned against the Japanese, a disillusioned Aung San began negotiating with communist and socialist leaders forming the Anti-Fascist People's Freedom League opposing Japanese fascism.

=== Post World War II ===
After World War II, Japan–Myanmar relations returned to having a stable relationship. On 9 November 1954, the treatment of Burma by the Japanese in WW2 was settled by the peace treaty and reparations agreement signed by Myanmar foreign minister Kyaw Nyein and Japanese foreign minister Okazaki Katsuo. The agreement was approved by the Japanese Parliament and pledged to give Myanmar US$200 million in reparations and $50 million to support economic cooperation over the next 10 years which would come to include the rebuilding of Yangon Port. Later, in 1966, Japan reviewed the agreement and provided and additional $140 million. Between 1962 and 1972, another $131.5 million in aid was paid. The aid was renewed in 1973 for another $1.87 billion by 1988. The Organisation for Economic Co-operation and Development estimated that two thirds of the aid Myanmar received in this period was from Japan.

Japan and Burma entered an Economic and Technical Cooperation Agreement in 1963, just after Ne Win's 1962 Burmese coup d'état. During the socialist period, Japan and Myanmar held some of the strongest ties among Asian countries with the relationship with Ne Win's government often being called "special relations." Ne Win himself was one of the Thirty Comrades trained by Suzuki Keiji.

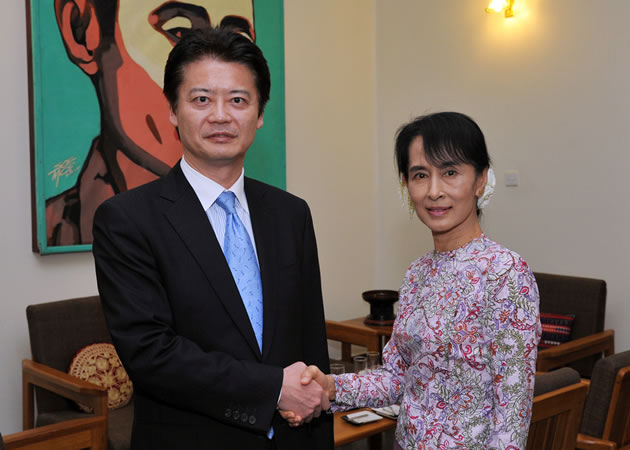
Foreign Minister Koichiro Gemba & Aung San Suu Kyi in Yangon, 2011

In the aftermath of the 8888 Uprising and the subsequent State Law and Order Restoration Council coup, Japan's support was significantly reduced until the 2011 transition to civilian rule. Japan's refusal to grant more aid without widespread economic reforms in 1987 may have influenced the controversial policies of the Ne Win government in 1987, that led to the uprising. Japan's decision to suspend the aid after the uprising also strained its 15 year investment into the country. Japan was one of few countries with meaningful influence to encourage national reconciliation but failed to exert its influence due to souring relations with the new military government. Japan, unlike Western countries, approved the name change to Myanmar in 1989. Japan's influence may have helped with some political reconciliation in Myanmar, such as its pressure for the Than Shwe junta to allowed a United Nations special rapporteur to enter the country and the release of Aung San Suu Kyi in 1995. In 2003, Khin Nyunt, the Prime Minister of Myanmar visited Japan to attend a regional summit a few months after Japan froze aid to Myanmar after the military took Aung San Suu Kyi back into custody. Japan's influence in this period was limited by the presence of a sizeable Japanese business lobbying group with interest in Myanmar that contradicts Japan's attempts to embargo or cut off aid.

In the wake of Myanmar's economic reforms in the 2010s, Japan increased its investment and political involvement in Myanmar. In 2013, Prime Minister of Japan Shinzo Abe visited Myanmar to discuss economic development in one of the first high-level official visits from Japan to Myanmar. Abe visited Myanmar just a few weeks after the first human rights dialogue between the two countries. Thein Sein would visit Japan multiple times in the 2010s for biannual Japan–Myanmar summits and his successor President Htin Kyaw would follow suit in 2017.

=== Recent relations ===
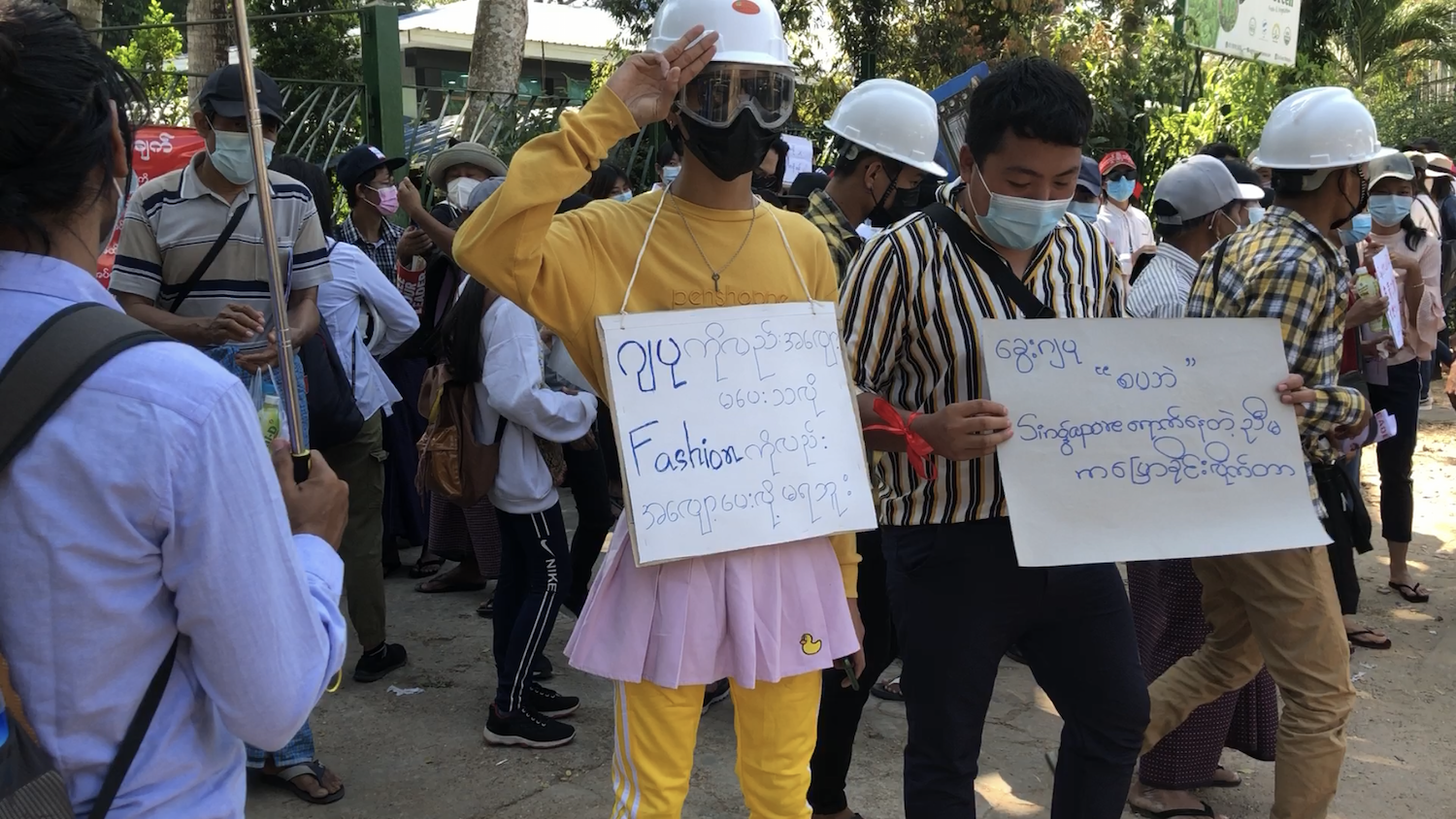
Protestors in cosplay in front of Japanese Embassy Yangon, 2021

After the 1 February 2021 Myanmar coup d'état, when Min Aung Hlaing ousted the NLD democratic government, thousands of demonstrators protested in Tokyo just 13 days after the coup. During the protests, Japanese journalist Yuki Kitazumi was charged on 4 May 2021 by the military junta for spreading false news, the first foreign journalist to be charged by the military junta since the coup.

Japan denounced the coup twice on 21 February and 28 February, strongly condemning the situation and the imprisonment of protestors. Japan's denouncement came slower than other G7 nations as Japanese Minister of Defence Yasuhide Nakayama believed that a cautious approach was necessary to keep Myanmar from growing further from the democratic community and joining the "League of China." Japan entered a dilemma in that if it sanctioned the military in the footsteps of many other Western countries, it could lose critical access and leverage over the Myanmar military. Furthermore, Japan's approach was also impacted by ASEAN's approach to the crisis. Japan had spent decades investing in the stability of Southeast Asia at large and could not undermine ASEAN's role or its own policy in the Indo-Pacific bridging repressive regimes with the wider community.

Japanese filmmaker Toru Kubota was sentenced to 10 years in jail on sedition charges after being detained in July 2022 for documenting anti-government demonstrations and reporting on the Rohingya minority previously. Kubota would be released in a mass amnesty on 17 November 2022 with Human Rights groups saying that the junta was engaging in hostage tactics to negotiate with foreign powers. Japan's chief cabinet secretary Hirokazu Matsuno maintained that they will continue to demand Myanmar take specific actions for the reinstatement of democracy.

Only 23 July 2022, the State Administration Council junta of Myanmar executed four political prisoners, marking the first time the death penalty had been carried out in Myanmar since the late 1980s. The G7 Nations, including Japan, issued a joint statement condemning the executions for its disregard of human rights and the rule of law. In the lead up to the 2020 Myanmar general election, Yōhei Sasakawa of the Nippon Foundation was appointed special envoy to Myanmar by Japan. He negotiated a ceasefire between the Arakan Army, an armed group in Rakhine State and the Myanmar Army in preparation to hold elections in the area. Later, during the course of the 2021-2022 Myanmar civil war, the Arakan Army would return to war. Sasakawa would broker yet another ceasefire by acting as an intermediary in November 2022 on humanitarian grounds. Junta spokespeople say that this is the first step towards a permanent ceasefire with the Arakan Army.

On 22 November 2025, amidst the China–Japan diplomatic crisis, Myanmar Deputy Minister of Information Zaw Min Tun told Xinhua News Agency Japanese Prime Minister Sanae Takaichi's remarks regarding a possible Taiwan contingency showed "no lessons learned from history” and "no remorse" for Japan’s wartime crimes across Asia, including Myanmar. He said that "Myanmar firmly condemns any possible resurgence of fascist tendencies in Japan", accusing Japan of supporting Taiwan independence and reaffirmed Myanmar's support for the One China policy.

== Economic relations ==
Japan has had a long history of economic development in and with Myanmar. Starting from the 1954 treaty providing reparation and economic cooperation. From 1954 until 1962, Japan's cooperation investments would finance the rebuilding of Yangon Port, the Lawpita Hydropower Project in Kayah State and textile factories. Japan further aided in rail transportation projects during this period.

The socialist period in Burmese period saw many bilateral treaties signed between the two countries including the Economic and Technical Cooperation Agreement of 1963 and the Airline Agreement of 1972. The Japanese company Fujimoto Co., Ltd based in Hiroshima Prefecture entered Myanmar in 1970 at the request of the Burmese Ministry of Agriculture and Forestry to mill teak and export to Japan.

Despite less friendly relations after the 8888 Uprising, Japan's Mitsui & Co. and Myanmar's Department of Urban and housing Development jointly developed Mingaladon Industrial Park, housing many company in textiles, food processing and electrical parts.

In 2011, the Japan External Trade Organization and the Union of Myanmar Federation of Chambers of Commerce and Industry (UMFCCI) announced the joint development of the Thilawa Special Economic Zone near Thilawa Port. The project was transferred to the Japan International Cooperation Agency and the newly formed Japan Thilawa SEZ Company consortium backed by Mitsubishi, Marubeni and Sumitomo in 2013 with construction on the project beginning in 2014.

The Japan Myanmar Association, a group to strengthen economic and diplomatic relations across various fields, was established under the initiative of President Thein Sein in 2013. The two countries later entered into a bilateral Investment treaty in 2014. The Japan International Cooperation Agency (JICA) became more involved in consulting for the newly democratic country in various areas. JICA developed a strategic urban development plan for Yangon and plans for the Yangon Urban Mass Rapid Transit system.

In the wake of the 2021 Myanmar coup d'état and subsequent 2021-2022 Myanmar civil war, Japanese companies' investment in Myanmar shrank. the Kirin Company withdrew its joint brewery ventures in Myanmar as part of terminating its partnership with Myanmar Economic Holdings, a company affiliated with the Myanmar Army. Mitsubishi Corporation divested its stake in Myanmar's Yetagun gas project after mounting pressure for international companies to divest from Myanmar's oil and gas industries in early 2022.

However, since June 2023, the Japanese government began to build schools in Myanmar in an effort to improve relations.

== Cultural relations ==
Japan and Burma developed not only political and economic ties, but also cultural ties, such as the Japanese literary work The Burmese Harp and its 1956 film adaptation.

Prior to independence, Kyaw Din a Burmese engineer and track and field athlete is credited for laying the groundwork for the technical and tactical traditions of Japanese football. He travelled around Japan teaching football in the aftermath of the Great Kanto Earthquake in 1923 and wrote instructional books about football. His student Shigemaru Takenokoshi would later play for the Japan national football team at the 1930 Far Eastern Championship Games. Kyaw Din was later elected to the Japan Football Hall of Fame in August 2007.

In 2014, the Ministry of Culture in Myanmar designed a commemorative coin to celebrate 60 years of diplomatic relations between the two countries. The coin featured the Bagan Archaeological Zone representing the preservation and restoration work undertaken by the two countries.

== Diplomatic missions ==
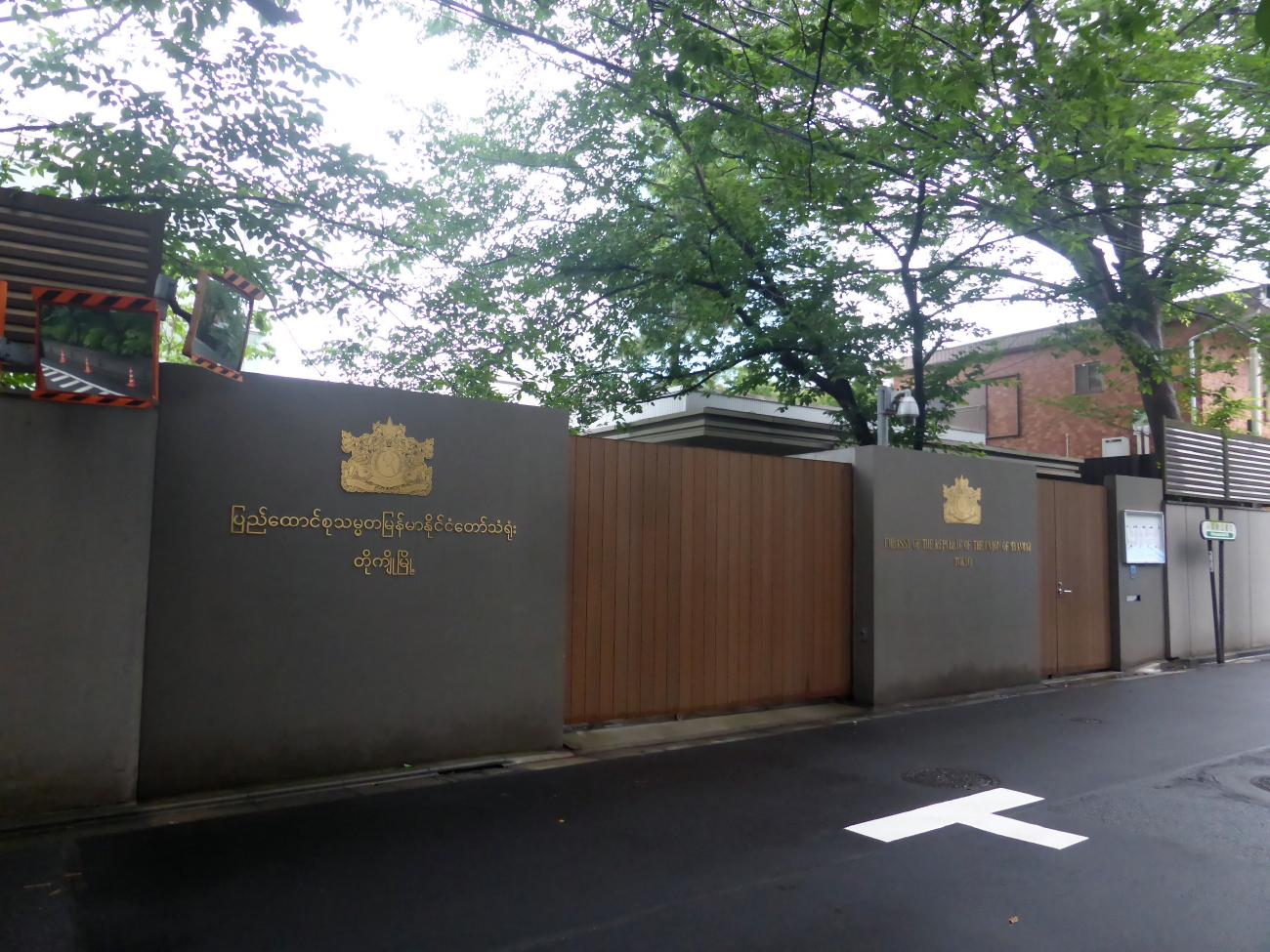
Myanmar embassy in Tokyo, Japan

The Myanmar embassy in Japan is located in Tokyo, whilst the Japanese embassy in Myanmar is located in Yangon. Myanmar also has an honorary consulate in Kobe, Japan.

The current ambassador of Japan in Myanmar is Ichirō Maruyama serving since 2018. The current ambassador of Myanmar in Japan is Soe Han, appointed in 2020. In 2022, the National Unity Government of Myanmar appointed a competing representative, Saw Ba Hla Thein.

== See also ==
- Foreign relations of Japan
- Foreign relations of Myanmar
