= Mobye Dam =

Dam in Shan State, Myanmar

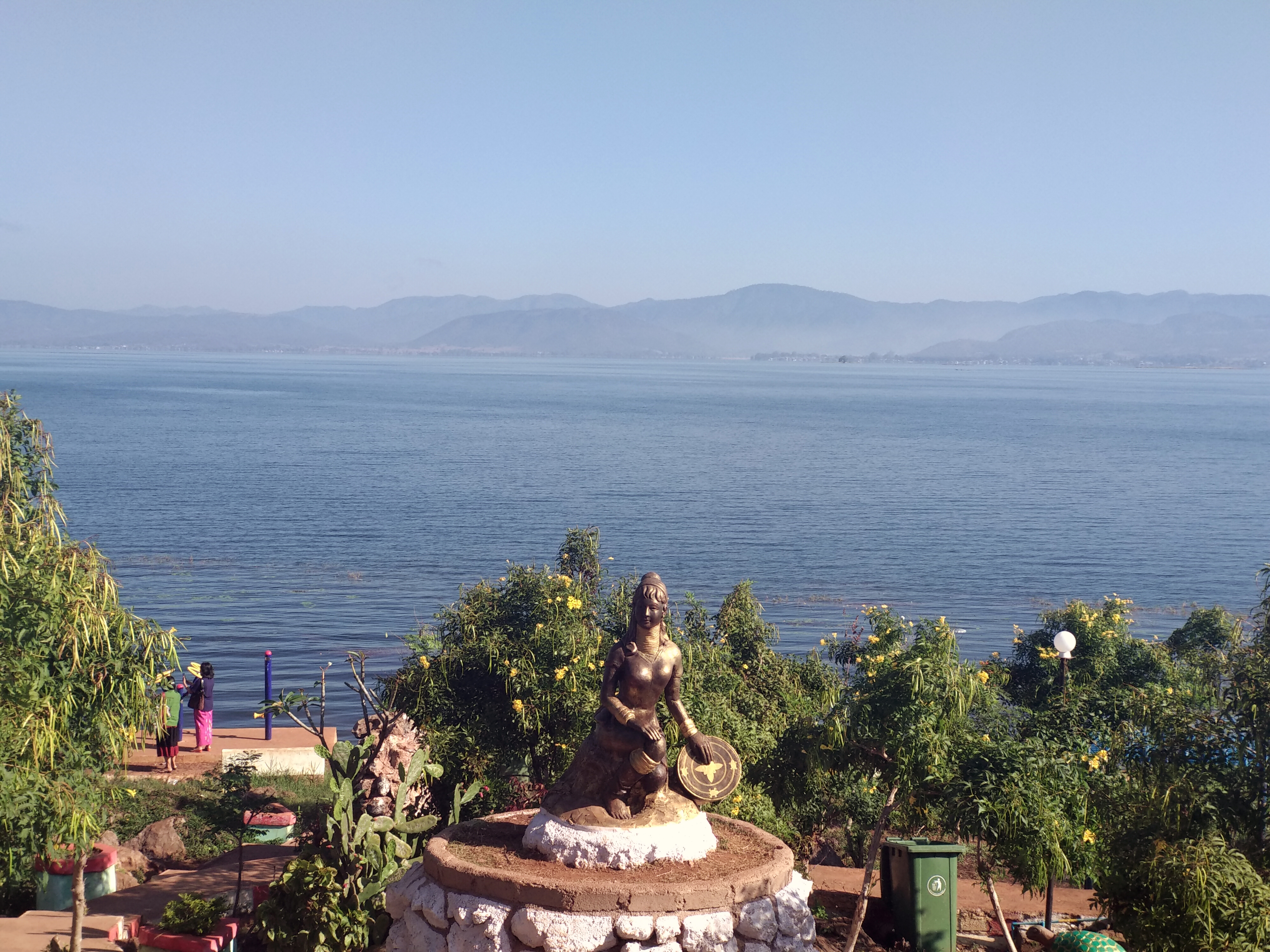
- Mobye Reservoir

- Location within Myanmar
- Country: Myanmar
- Location: Pekon Township, Shan State
- Coordinates: 19°46′57″N 97°05′23″E
- Purpose: Power, Irrigation
- Construction began: 1962
- Opening date: 1970

Dam and spillways
- Impounds: Pilu River
- Height (foundation): 11 metres (36 ft)

Reservoir
- Creates: Mobye Reservoir
- Surface area: 207 km^{2} (80 sq mi)

Lawpita Hydropower Plant No.1
- Installed capacity: 196MW (for the whole Lawpita Project)

Mobye Dam (also Moe Bye Dam or Mongpai Dam) is a dam near the village of Mobye in Shan State, Myanmar. The dam is part of the Lawpita hydropower project and is located in the valley of the Pilu River (also called the Baluchaung River), south of Inle lake.

== History ==
The Lawpita project was the first large scale hydropower project constructed in Myanmar, it was initiated following the Second World War with support from Japan as part of a war repatation agreement and was built by Kajima and Nippon Koei.

Construction of the two most important components (Mobye Dam and No.2 power station) began in 1960 and were completed in the 1970s and are still operational today.

The project has received a large amount of criticism, the construction of the dam resulted in the destruction of the local ecosystem as well as a farmland used by the local Karenni population. Over 12000 people have had to be displaced to make way for the project. The area was militarized to protect the infrastructure with over 18000 landmines placed along the route of the transmission lines and the military perpetrating a number of human rights abuses with the benefits of the dam being diverted away from the local region.

As the dam is the only drainage point for the water at Inle Lake, torrential rains have the potential to cause flooding both above the dam due to slow drainage as well as below the dam due to the abrupt releases of water by the military. During the Myanmar civil war the dam was breached by Tatmadaw forces during combat with the local People's Defence Force.
