= Bo Taya =

Burmese writer (?–1993)

Major General Bo Taya ဗိုလ်တာရာ

Member of the Anti-Fascist People's Freedom League

Personal details
- Born: Khin Maung Oo; 13 April 1913 Pyinmana, Myanmar
- Died: 6 February 1993 (aged 79)
- Education: Grade 10 English-Burmese
- Occupation: Writer, Politician

Bo Taya (born as Khin Maung Oo, 13 April 1919 in Pyinman) was a Burmese writer, military officer and a member of the Thirty Comrades. He served in the Burmese National Army (BIA) and Burmese Defense Force and participated in the Japanese Revolution.

== Biography and career ==
On 13 April 1919, he was born in Pyinmana. His birth name was Khin Maung Oo.

In 1936, he joined the Pyinmana District's Dobama Asiayone and was actively involved in the District Federation of Student Unions, District Burial Armed Forces and in the establishment of the Farmers' Union within the district.

From 1942 to 1945, he joined the Burmese National Army (BIA) and Burmese Defense Force and participated in the Japanese Revolution.

In 1959, he married Daw Saw Khin. In the 1960 Burmese general election, he was elected as a Pyithu Hluttaw MP. In 1961, he received a literature award for his novel Thirty Comrades's Back of Home.

== Published books ==
- Mi Pann Ma (Burmese: မိပန်းမ, Woman) 1957
- Maw Taw Yayyin (Burmese: မေတ္တာရေယာဉ်, Merchant Boat) 1959
- Mike Thamya Dan (Burmese: မိုက်သမျှဒဏ်, A Fool's Fool) 1960
- Chit Thamya Ko (Burmese: ချစ်သမျှကို, Love All) 1961
- Mone Chit Thanar (Burmese: မုန်းချစ်သနား) 1961
- Moe and Myae (Burmese: မိုးနှင့်မ, Rain and Ground) 1961

== Death ==
Bo Taya died in Yangon on February 6, 1993.
