= Burma Army =

Burma Army may refer to:

- Myanmar Army, the current armed forces of Burma (Myanmar), also its predecessors:
- Royal Burmese armed forces, army of Burma under native dynasties until 1885
- British Burma Army (1 Apr. 1937 – 7 Sept. 1945), army created when Burma was separated from the British Raj (India)
- Burma Independence Army (28 Dec. 1941 – 24 July 1942), army created by Japan to assist in its conquest of Burma
  - Burma Defence Army (26 Aug. 1942 – 1 Aug. 1943), re-organized Burma Independence Army
- Burma National Army (1 Aug. 1943 – 7 Sept. 1945), army of the Japanese-sponsored State of Burma, which later turned on the Japanese (27 Mar. 1945)
  - Patriotic Burmese Forces, Allied name (after 23 June 1945) for the Burma National Army after it turned on the Japanese
- Japanese Burma Area Army (27 Mar. 1943 – 15 Aug. 1945), a Japanese force during World War II
