= Red Flag Labour Unions =

The Red Flag Labour Unions was a trade union movement in Burma, linked to the Red Flag Communist Party. On 3 July 1946, the British governor of Burma Sir Henry Knight banned the Red Flag Labour Unions and the related Red Flag Cultivators Unions.
