= Thakin Tin Mya =

Burmese politician

- Born: 9 September 1924; Danuphyu, Ayeyarwady Division, British Burma
- Died: 28 February 2015 (aged 90)
- Spouses: Phyu Phyu; Than Than Nyunt
- Parent(s): Pho Nyein, Ohn Pwint

Thakin Tin Mya (9 September 1924 in Danubyu – 28 February 2015) was a Burmese politician who served as political commissar in the Seventh Military Region of the Burma National Army.

== Biography ==
Tin Mya was born on 9 September 1924 in Danuphyu, Ayeyarwady Division, British Burma to parents Pho Nyein and Ohn Pwint. He joined the anti-colonial movement Dobama Asiayone. In 1945, he served as political commissar in the Seventh Military Region of the Burma National Army. In the same year he was included in the Central Committee of the Communist Party of Burma as an alternate member. When the Communist Party was divided in early 1946, he joined Thakin Soe's break-away group (the Red Flag Communist Party).

Thakin Tin Mya was expelled from the Red Flag Communist Party in 1949. Subsequently, he returned to the Communist Party of Burma.He was arrested and jailed in 1957. He was released from prison in 1960, but was again jailed for a shorter period in 1962. He later joined the governing Burma Socialist Programme Party and was included in the Central Committee of the party.

Thakin Tin Mya voiced support for the 1988 pro-democracy protests, although he himself did not join the movement. He has written a five-volume work on the history of the struggle against Japanese occupation of Burma during the Second World War.

He died on 28 February 2015 at the age of 91 in Yangon. He was survived by his second wife, Than Than Nyunt. His first wife was Phyu Phyu.
