= Mobye =

Village in Shan State, Myanmar

Mobye Village Tract မိုးဗြဲအုပ်စု
- Village tract
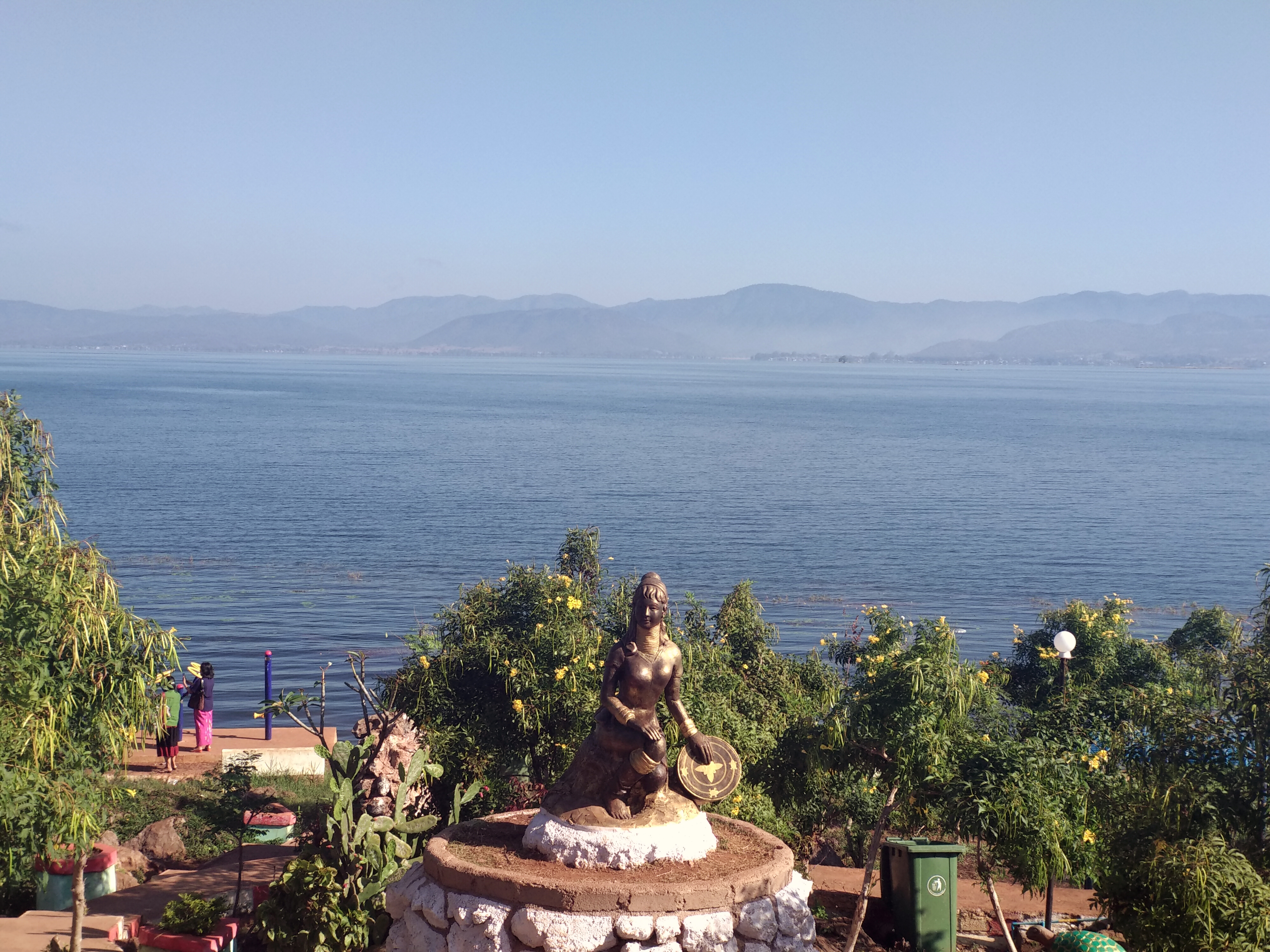

- Location within Myanmar
- Coordinates: 19°44′46″N 97°5′24″E
- Country: Myanmar
- State: Shan State
- District: Kalaw District
- Township: Pekon Township
- Elevation: 2,988 ft (910.7 m)

Population (2019)
  - Total: 28,287
- Time zone: UTC+6:30 (MST)

Mobye (Burmese: မိုးဗြဲ; also spelt Mobre or Moe Bye) is a village tract within Pekon Township, Shan State, Myanmar. It is located on the southern end of the Mobye Reservoir located south of Inle Lake and contains the lowest point within Pekon Township at 2,950 feet (900 m). The village of Mobye is located within the village tract along with 35 other villages in close proximity.

== Geography ==
Mobye is located on the border with Kayah State, 10 miles northwest of its the Kayah capital Loikaw. The village tract is connected to Pekon, the township's principal town, and Loikaw through waterways, railways and a roadway.

The Mobye Dam, located within the village, is built along the Pilu River (also called the Baluchaung River). Together with the Lawpita Dam, the dams power the Lawpita Power Plant system. The Mobye dam began construction in 1969 with the first of the two hydropower stations along the Pilu River completing in 1974. During this period, 8000 people were forced to relocate away from the reservoir area. The construction of the two dams in 1992 was conducted by the Myanmar Army and displaced over 12,000 people and created severe negative social and ecological impacts in the area.

== History ==
Mobye was formerly the capital of Mongpai, a Shan state. It belonged to the Central Division of the Southern Shan States.

During the 2021 Myanmar civil war, Mobye was the site of several battles. Due to its proximity to Loikaw, Mobye was the site of skirmishes during the 2021 Battle of Loikaw. Battles between junta troops and the Mobye PDF along roads and villages leading to Loikaw. Additionally, there were firefights in the village tract throughout the aftermath of the 2022 Battle of Loikaw. During the course of Operation 1111, the Karenni Nationalities Defense Force seized control of the town during spillover clashes from fighting in Loikaw.

On June 30, 2025, a large number of Junta forces, supported by air, drone and artillery support, recaptured Mobye. About 40 rebels were killed in the fighting.

== Demographics ==
Historical population
Year	Mobye Village Tract	±%
2018	27,798	—
2019	28,287	+1.8%

There are several ethnic groups within the area, including, Kayan, Shan, Bamar, Karenni and Intha people.
