= People's Volunteer Organisation =

Post-WWII Paramilitary Group in Burma

The People's Volunteer Organisation (Burmese: ပြည်သူ့ရဲဘော်တပ်; Pyithu Yèbaw Tat) was a 50,000-strong Burmese pro-independence paramilitary force founded by Aung San shortly after the August 1945 Japanese surrender. Disguised as a veterans' association, the PVO drilled and trained for a hypothetical revolution against the British authorities in Burma.

The PVO dissolved on 4 January 1948 when Burma was granted independence under the Burma Independence Act 1947.
