= Thirty Comrades =

Group of thirty Burmese revolutionaries responsible for creating the Burmese military

The Thirty Comrades (Burmese: ရဲဘော်သုံးကျိပ်) constituted the embryo of the modern Burmese army called the Burma Independence Army (BIA) which was formed to fight for independence from Britain. This was accomplished just before the majority of the Thirty Comrades returned with the invading Japanese Army initially through Southern Burma in December 1941.

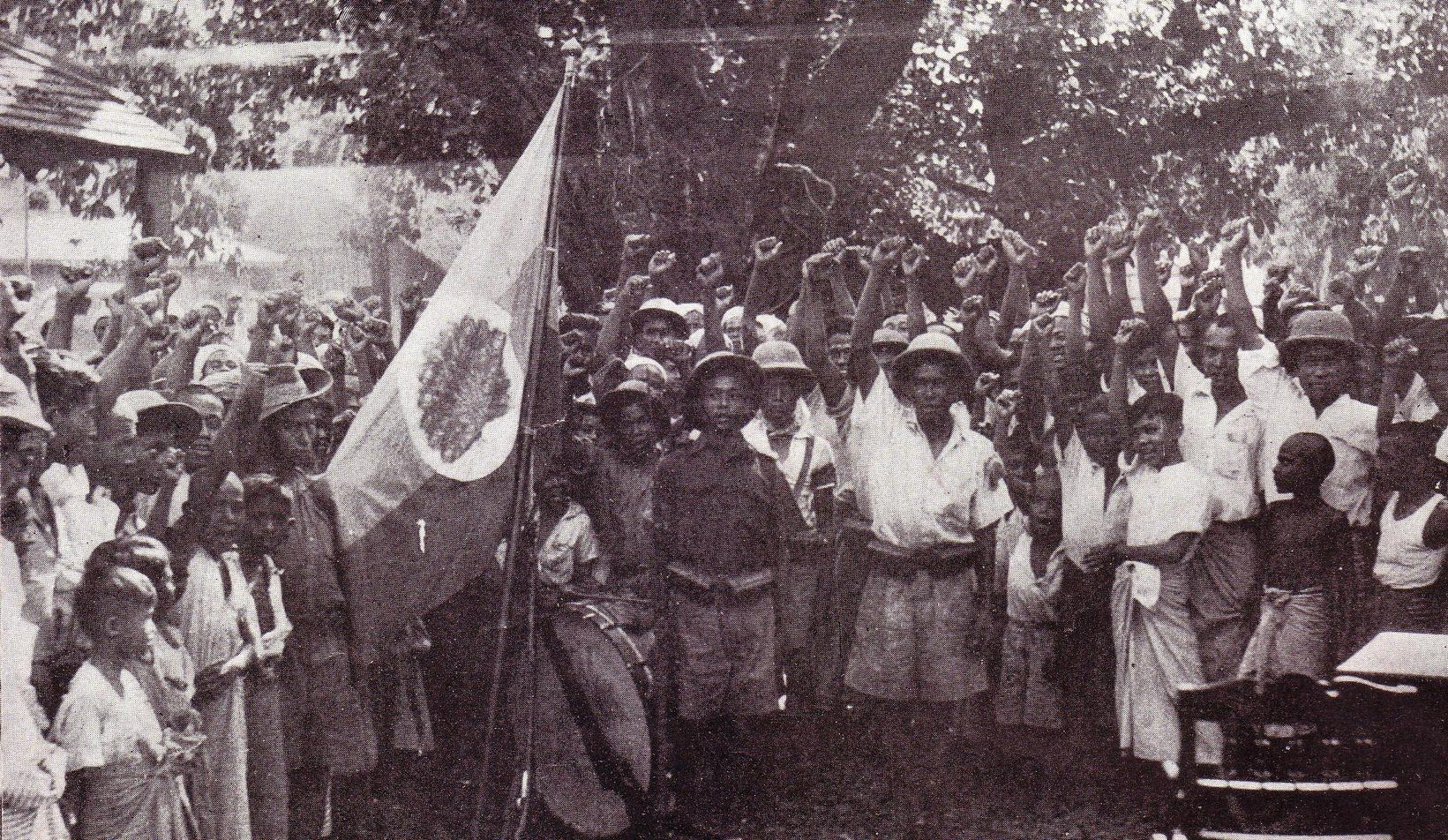
Members of the BIA pose with raised fists, 1942.

In April 1941, small groups of Burmese youth left Burma secretly to obtain military training to fight the British colonists in the struggle for independence. Their leader was Thakin Aung San and they were sent by the Dobama Asiayone ("We Burmans Association") with the intention to get assistance from Guangzhou. By a quirk of fate, however, they ran into the Japanese instead in Amoy and arrived in Japan later to be flown to occupied parts of Sanya, in order to receive military training from the Japanese Army. They were later moved to Formosa for security reasons and subsequently returned to Burma via Vietnam and Thailand with the Japanese. On 26 December 1941, in a house (owned by a Burmese doctor) in Bangkok, about 25 of the Thirty Comrades had their blood drawn from their arms in syringes, then poured into a silver bowl from which each of them drank – thway thauk in time-honoured Burmese military tradition – pledging "eternal loyalty" among themselves and to the cause of Burmese independence. Their average age was just 24 years. A Japanese officer called Suzuki Keiji, better known among the Burmese by his nom de guerre Bo Mogyo (Commander Thunderbolt) and head of a special intelligence unit called Minami Kikan (南機関) formed in order to support a national uprising in Burma, was the mentor and principal trainer of the Thirty Comrades. The British were driven out of Burma to India during World War II.

The Thirty Comrades, each taking a nom de guerre, were:

No.	Nom de guerre	Real name	Notes
1.	Bo Teza	Thakin Aung San	Senior Leader, founding member of the Communist Party of Burma (CPB) and leader of the group sent by Thakin Kodaw Hmaing, he was simply called Bogyoke Aung San by the rest, became War Minister in 1944 before he led the Burma National Army (BNA) in the Resistance against the Japanese, co-founded the Anti-Fascist People's Freedom League (AFPFL), and was assassinated along with most of his cabinet on 19 July 1947 at the age of 32 before Burma gained independence on 4 January 1948 (See also Martyrs' Day)
2.	Thakin Tun Oke	Thakin Tun Oke	Senior Leader, a leader of the "Ba Sein – Tun Oke faction" (Socialists) of the Dobama Asi-ayone who remained in Japan and never underwent military training in Hainan
3.	Bo Let Ya	Thakin Hla Pe	Senior Leader, founder member of the CPB, became Commander in Chief of the Burma Defence Army (BDA) under Gen. Aung San as War Minister during the Japanese Occupation in 1944, signed the Let Ya-Freeman Defence Agreement in 1947 as an annex to the main Nu-Attlee Treaty, served in Thakin Nu's AFPFL government as deputy prime minister till 1952, arrested after the breakdown of the 1963 peace parley, rejoined U Nu and his insurgent Parliamentary Democracy Party (PDP) in 1969, killed in action by the Karen National Union (KNU) on 29 November 1978
4.	Bo Setkya	Thakin Aung Than	Senior Leader, "Ba Sein – Tun Oke faction", joined the Socialist Party and served in the AFPFL government, went underground after Ne Win's 1962 coup d'état, died shortly before U Nu arrived in Thailand to form the PDP
5.	Bo Zeya	Thakin Hla Maung	Senior Leader, a Dobama student who became a Socialist leader of the Army rebellion in 1948, returned from China for the 1963 peace parley between Ne Win's Revolutionary Council government and various insurgent groups as head of the CPB delegation, killed in action on 16 April 1968
6.	Bo Ne Win	Thakin Shu Maung	Senior Leader, "Ba Sein – Tun Oke faction", became Commander in Chief of the Tatmadaw in 1949 following the Karen rebellion and removal of Gen. Smith Dun, took over from U Nu as caretaker government after the AFPFL split and escalating insurgency problem in 1958, staged a coup in 1962 and became military dictator of Burma
7.	Bo Yan Naing	Thakin Tun Shein	Leader, a Dobama student, organised Thanmani Tat in 1938, led 3rd Invasion Column, BIA, hero of the Battle of Shwedaung in 1942, Commander Rangoon Garrison, Military Secretary to Head of State from 1942, Chief of Operations between 1943-44, a leader of Mahabama Party from 1944. Arrested by Nu government in 1946, organised the armed resistance against Ne Win military regime after founding the National Liberation Council in 1960 and the Burmese National Liberation Army in 1965. He joined forces with Nu's insurgent Parliamentary Democracy Party in 1969, returned to Rangoon after the 1980 amnesty
8.	Bo La Yaung	Thakin Ba Gyan	Leader, led the white-band PVO (People's Volunteer Organisation – Aung San's militia formed after disbanding the BNA) or Yèbaw Hpyu underground in 1948, surrendered in 1958, appointed an official in the Trade Ministry by Ne Win's Burma Socialist Programme Party (BSPP) government
9.	Bo Hmu Aung	Thakin San Hlaing	Leader, led the yellow-band PVO (Yèbaw Wa), served as Defence Minister in U Nu's AFPFL government, attempted a pre-emptive putsch with Bo Min Gaung and arrested after the 1962 coup, released in 1967, joined U Nu's insurgent PDP in Thailand, returned to Rangoon after the 1980 amnesty, formed with U Nu the League for Democracy and Peace (LDP) during the 8888 Uprising
10.	Bo Yan Aung	Thakin Hla Myaing	Leader, he was the friend of Aung San's who left India with him to China in 1940. Him and Aung San were the first to accept Japanese support and to receive military and political training from the Japanese in the support of Burmese independence. He was the third Communist member of the Thirty Comrades and the leader of the 1948 Army rebellion. He participated in the 1963 peace parley, but was later killed in the CPB purge on 26 December 1967
11.	Bo Moe	Thakin Aye Maung	
12.	Bo Min Gaung	Thakin Saw Lwin	joined the Socialist Party, served in U Nu's AFPFL government, arrested after the failed 1963 peace parley
13.	Bo Mya Din	Thakin Than Tin	"Tharrawaddy" Thakin Than Tin to distinguish from no.29 Bo Than Tin
14.	Bo Kyaw Zaw	Thakin Shwe	became a leader of the CPB but decided not to join the Army rebellion in 1948, defeated the Karen National Defence Organisation (KNDO) in 1949 and drove the Kuomintang out of Burma in 1955, forced to retire from the Tatmadaw in 1957, unsuccessfully ran for parliament in 1960, peace activist with Thakin Kodaw Hmaing during the 1963 peace parley, went underground in 1976 to rejoin the CPB, exiled to Yunnan province, China in 1988
15.	Bo Ye Htut	Thakin Aung Thein	a Dobama student who became a Communist leader of the 1948 Army rebellion, surrendered in 1963, appointed instructor at the BSPP training school, arrested after the coup in 1988
16.	Bo Lin Yone	Thakin Tun Shwe	
17.	Bo Hpone Myint	Thakin Tin Aye	
18.	Bo Myint Aung	Thakin Soe	not the Red Flag Communist leader of the same name, beset with drink problem and shot himself in 1945
19.	Bo Tauk Htain	Thakin San Mya	arrested in 1963 after the failed peace parley
20.	Bo Taya	Thakin Khin Maung Oo	became a big game hunter and writer of his exploits
21.	Bo Zinyaw	Thakin Than Nyunt	a Dobama student
22.	Bo Nyana	Thakin Maung Maung	a Dobama student
23.	Bo Bala	Thakin Tun Lwin	arrested in 1963 after the failed peace parley
24.	Bo Min Yaung	Thakin Hla	a Dobama student
25.	Bo Myint Swe	Thakin Tun Khin	"Ba Sein – Tun Oke faction"
26.	Bo Saw Aung	Thakin Ngwe	"Ba Sein – Tun Oke faction" – Died in battle in 1942 in eastern Burma
27.	Bo Saw Naung	Thakin Thit	"Ba Sein – Tun Oke faction"
28.	Bo Moe Nyo	Thakin Kyaw Sein	"Ba Sein – Tun Oke faction"
29.	Bo Than Tin	Thakin Than Tin	"Ba Sein – Tun Oke faction", no training in Hainan, died in Formosa
30.	Bo Htein Win	Saung	a student who was studying weaving in Japan at the time, with no training in Hainan, died of malaria in Thailand

According to a historian of Burma Professor Gordon H Luce, who in the pre-war years taught at Rangoon University, the Thirty Comrades led by General Aung San helped establish the 4th Burmese State in history (the 1st by King Anawrahta (1044–1078), the 2nd by King Tabinshwehti (1530–1550), the 3rd by King Alaungpaya (1752–1760)).

Dr Ba Maw, who was the Head of State and "Supreme Leader' (in Burmese Adipadi Gyi) from August 1943 to about March 1945, during the administration established by the Japanese, had somewhat different opinions on the role of the Thirty Comrades. (See Ba Maw, Breakthrough in Burma: Memoirs of a Revolution 1939–1946, Yale University Press, 1968).

Bo Ye Htut (no. 15), the last of the Thirty Comrades, died at the age of 92 on 28 November 2013, after Bo Kyaw Zaw (No. 14) died in Kunming on 10 October 2012, Among the prominent leaders of the Thirty Comrades who had died over the last decade were Bo Ne Win (No. 6) who died on 5 December 2002, and who from March 1962 to about ten years beyond his "retirement" in late July 1988 was the ruler, and in later years the "puppet master", of Burma, and Bo Hmu Aung (No. 9) who died in 2004.
