= Suzuki Keiji =

Japanese army intelligence officer

- 鈴木敬司
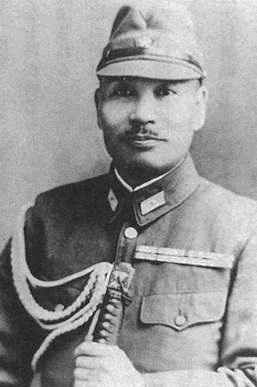
- Born: 1897; Shizuoka Prefecture, Japan
- Died: 1967 (aged 69–70)
- Military career
- Allegiance: Empire of Japan
- Branch: Imperial Japanese Army
- Service years: 1918–1945
- Rank: Major General
- Nicknames: Bo Mogyo ("Thunderbolt Commander") "Japanese Lawrence of Arabia" "Thunderbolt Commander"
- Unit: Taiwan Army of Japan
- Commands: Southern Spy Agency
- Conflicts: World War II

Suzuki Keiji (鈴木敬司, Keiji Suzuki; February 6, 1897 – September 20, 1967) was a Japanese army intelligence officer during the Second World War. Operating primarily in Burma, he helped form the Burma Independence Army and was an advocate for Burmese independence, described as a "Japanese Lawrence of Arabia". The Burmese refererred to him by the nom de guerre Bo Mogyo, meaning "Thunderbolt Commander".

== Training ==
Suzuki was trained at the Imperial Japanese Army Academy and graduated as an infantry officer in 1918. He subsequently attended the General Staff College and in 1929 began clandestine operations in the Philippines. His main focus, in both his studies and early career, was Anglo-American affairs. Suzuki's official military position was the Head of the General Staff Headquarters' Shipping Section. However, he was trained at the Rikugun Nakano Gakkō and was secretly an intelligence agent charged with disrupting Allied activities in Asia by shutting down supply lines to China through the Burma Road.

== Operations ==
In the 1930s, Suzuki, operating out of Bangkok, recruited a number of Burmese dissidents. His network of associates would later become the nucleus of the Minami Kikan (南機関) underground spy organisation. He was closely connected with the Thakins, a nationalist group of students and labourers. In 1940, he secretly entered Rangoon with assistance from his network of contacts, posing as a reporter named Minami Masuyo.

Suzuki worked on Hainan Island for six months in 1941, training the Thirty Comrades in preparation for the Japanese invasion of Burma.

In 1941, Japanese Imperial general Headquarters authorised Suzuki to create a Burmese military force under Japanese authority. He drew together the Thirty Comrades, a group of independence fighters which included Aung San, Ne Win and Bo Let Ya. Suzuki's work eventually led to the creation of the Burmese Independence Army. However, in 1942 a Japanese Army commander, Lieutenant-General Shijiro Iida, became concerned over Suzuki's pro-independence stance and authority over the Burmese Independence Army. He orchestrated Suzuki's recall to Japan, and the Burmese Independence Army was subsequently reorganised and placed under the direction of Aung San (himself under the control of the Japanese). Suzuki returned to Tokyo, and for the rest of the war fulfilled the duties of his official role as Head of Shipping by overseeing transport and logistics.

Suzuki had a flair for the dramatic. His chosen Burmese name, Bo Mogyo, was a reference to the thunderbolt which Burmese folk tradition held would destroy the "umbrella" (a symbol of British colonial rule). He engaged in a blood-drinking ceremony of comradeship with his companions.

During the Japanese occupation of Burma, the BIA tried to persuade the Burmese populace by saying that Suzuki was a long-lost descendant of Prince Myingun, an older half-brother of the last Burmese king who had escaped to British-controlled Burma following a failed coup attempt against his father, who many Burmese people saw as the legitimate heir to the last Burmese kingdom.

After his death in 1967, Suzuki was posthumously honoured by the Burmese leader Ne Win.
