= Battle of Loikaw (2022) =

Battle in Myanmar civil war (2021-present)

- Part of the Karenni theater in the Myanmar civil war
Date	6 January – 8 February 2022 (1 month and 2 days)
Location	Loikaw, Kayah State, Myanmar 19.63648°N 97.207488°E
Result	Return to status quo: KNDF and PDF fail to fully capture Loikaw

Belligerents
State Administration Council; Tatmadaw; Myanmar Army; 66th Division; 530th Battalion; 55th Division; 422nd Battalion; Myanmar Police Force	People's Defence Force; Loikaw PDF; Demoso PDF; Battalion A; Battalion F; Mobye PDF; Phruso PDF; Karenni Nationalities Defence Force; 2nd Battalion; 3rd Battalion; Karenni National Progressive Party; Karenni Army; Karenni People's Defense Forces: Karenni Democratic Front; Generation-Z 2021 army; Loikaw Division

Commanders and leaders
Soe Win; Zaw Myo Tin; Thant Zin Oo †	Khu Daniel †

Strength
Unknown	6,200 (KNDF)

Casualties and losses
86+ killed 30+ wounded	2000+ killed 1500+ wounded
- 38+ civilians killed 13+ civilians injured 75% of Loikaw's population flees 90,000 refugees from Loikaw and surrounding villages

The 2022 Battle of Loikaw was a battle for the city of Loikaw, in Myanmar's Kayah State, between January and July 2022. The State Administration Council's Tatmadaw forces attacked the city at the beginning of 2022, which was being held by the Karenni Nationalities Defence Force and local People's Defence Force groups. The fighting caused over 90,000 people in Loikaw Township to flee.

== Prelude ==
Since 1949, ethnic Karenni militias have waged a low-level insurgency in Myanmar's Kayah State, where they make up the majority of the population. While intense clashes broke out between 2010 and 2012, they died down for the most part after democratic leader Aung San Suu Kyi was elected. Tensions rose higher than ever after the 2021 Myanmar coup d'état, where Karenni militias and local PDF groups (anti-junta civilian militias) fought against the Tatmadaw for control of Kayah State.

An initial battle for Loikaw began on 19 May 2021, and ended by mid-June of that year with a ceasefire. Fighting still continued in nearby villages throughout July, and in August, Karenni militias and local PDF allied together in favor of the National Unity Government of Myanmar.

On 3 December, junta troops blocked off the road between Loikaw, Demoso, and Bawlakhe, in anticipation of a battle with the KNDF-PDF. A KNDF official corroborated the reports about an imminent battle, claiming the KNDF-PDF were using forest roads and the junta was using the main road. The official also claimed that the junta was preparing for an offensive, and part of the reason the roads were blocked was to root out possible KNDF fighters or supporters. Fighting began in the village of Konna on 13 December, and restarted in Demoso township again on 16 December. On 18 December, Konna was burnt down during a battle between the KNDF and junta, and parts of the village of Naunglong were set ablaze as well. Fleeing residents claimed that junta troops guarded the fire so as to prevent its extinguishment. On 1 January 2022, rebel forces claimed several Loikaw PDF and KNDF forces were killed in the battles, along with 50 junta troops. In Pankan, junta troops massacred 23 people, and the bodies were not discovered until later.

== Battle ==
On 6 January, the junta launched an offensive all across Kayah State. Fighting broke out in Loikaw, Demoso, and Phruso townships, and in Loikaw city, battles occurred at the intersection of Kayentharya road. The 2nd Battalion of the KNDF claimed that in the Kayentharya road skirmish, 15 junta troops were killed, and there were no losses for the KNDF or PDF. At the same time, Karenni Democratic Front and GZ-21 fighters ambushed junta troops at Loikaw University's school of Technology, injuring ten junta troops with no KDF-GZ losses. Junta troops shot and injured two civilians in response. Armored junta vehicles were also seen heading towards Demoso township to aid the junta's offensive. The clashes in Loikaw continued into the next morning, particularly in Myung Ward and the village of Pankan. In Myung Ward, two people were killed and four were injured in the crossfire of the battle, and near the headquarters of the KNPP, seven people were injured. The junta also reportedly bombed the city with planes, a rare occurrence in Kayah State. Six civilians were killed in the fighting on 7 January, according to the KNDF. After the battle began, Loikaw shut down entirely. All administrative and government offices were vacated, and the Loikaw hospital, along with its patients and workers, moved to Taunggyi.

Residents of Loikaw claimed that "there was nowhere to flee", and the offensive caused half of Kayah State to become internally displaced. In Pankan, fierce battles between the KNDF and junta troops caused the deaths of two civilians who couldn't be evacuated in time. On 8 January, the junta continued airstrikes on Loikaw, and urban fighting continued in Minelon Ward and Pankan. Some PDF were injured and killed in the attacks. In the fighting on 8 January, the KNDF claimed 30 junta soldiers were killed, including a major, and one tank and one helicopter was damaged. After the clashes on 8 January, the junta retreated back into villages closer to Shan state and Demoso township.

Refugees fleeing Loikaw and heading to Shan State stated that traffic jams were prevalent, and the junta-controlled roads demanded money for vehicle inspections in order to pass. A skirmish on 11 January injured one KDF soldier and an unknown amount of junta troops. While there were no air raids over Loikaw on 11 January, tensions between KDF, KNDF, and PDF against the 250-man garrison of junta troops was high. Evacuation routes also opened up. The KNDF warned that civilians should not go near long rows of villages due to the chance of fighting breaking out. That same day, a battle in Loikaw destroyed the church in Doukhu ward. Fighting in Doukhu ward continued into the evening, along with the fighting in Minelon and My Lo wards. A deputy battalion commander in the Loikaw PDF claimed that the junta suffered casualties during the battle.

On 12 January, Burmese junta planes attacked KNDF-PDF positions near Loikaw, but the KNDF alleged the attacks missed. The militia also claimed that around 20 junta troops were killed during the battle on 12 January, which occurred in the mines and village line. Much of these areas were empty of civilians. By mid-January, 75% of Loikaw's population had fled, mainly towards Shan State. The KNDF claimed on 13 January that during a battle at Minelon Technical University, several junta soldiers were killed and there was nobody to pick up the casualties. Three PDF were killed by land mines in a separate incident, and one civilian was shot dead.

Fighting paused between 14 and 15 January, and restarted again in Myung Ward on 16 January. The KNDF estimated 20 junta soldiers were injured in the fighting. Clashes restarted on 19 January in Doukhu ward, where the KNDF claimed to kill 15 junta soldiers. Junta general Zaw Min Tun (not to be confused with Zaw Myo Tin) claimed that while PDF and KNDF were attacking junta bases and offices in Loikaw, the junta did not suffer any casualties. On 21 January, residents of Loikaw discovered thirteen bodies in Myung ward. The NGO that discovered them stated that intense fighting was taking place in Myung Ward and in the six-mile village near Loikaw. A junta air attack on 24 January killed at least two people in Loikaw as well.

Throughout Loikaw township, a family of six and one man were killed in two separate villages on 29 January, and in Loikaw city, two bodies were discovered in a junta-controlled part of the city. Many of the bodies were found tied up and killed, some in toilets. A Loikaw resident claimed that during his time under junta occupation, junta troops said "neighborhoods would be cleared", and suggested there were more missing bodies.

Fighting had cooled down by 3 February, and residents described the situation as quiet in the day and fighting taking place at night. On 1 February, Lieutenant General Soe Win visited Kayah State and sacked the leader of Kayah State, replacing him with Zaw Myo Tin. The sacking occurred because the KNDF controlled 90% of Kayah State, with the exception of major cities like Bawlakhe, Hpruso, and parts of Loikaw and Demoso and the major roads. Soe Win visited Loikaw on 4 February, meeting with religious leaders. He also visited the Loikaw prison, where the Karenni Army attacked in January, and spoke with police officers. Security was tightened, and residents claimed to have seen fighter jets during the visit. The KNDF criticized the visit.

On 7 February, a KNDF ambush killed seven junta troops in Kayeng Thayar, in eastern Loikaw township. While there was still fighting in Loikaw City, much of it had died down by February to the point refugees began to return. Most battles fought were ambushes, and took place on the city limits and in villages in the township. On 9 February, three children were killed in a junta bombing in the village of Le Thu.

== Aftermath ==
On 28 May, junta troops shot and killed a Karenni youth in Loikaw after the youth had broken mirrors at the bus station with his friends. An ambush also occurred on 8 June, and rebels and junta forces got into a firefight near Mobye, Pekon Township.
