= Battle of Loikaw (2021) =

Battle in Myanmar civil war (2021-present)

- Part of the Karenni theater in the Myanmar civil war
Date	21 May – 12 June 2021 (3 weeks and 1 day)
Location	Loikaw, Kayah State, Myanmar 19.63648°N 97.207488°E
Result	Ceasefire: Myanmar Military control the City and KNDF and PDF troops withdrew.; Clashes continue in the northwest areas of the township; 2022 Battle of Loikaw after SAC offensive early that year

Belligerents
State Administration Council; Tatmadaw; Myanmar Army; 66th Division; 530th Battalion; 55th Division; 422nd Battalion; Myanmar Police Force	People's Defence Force; Loikaw PDF; Demoso PDF; Mobre PDF; East Phegunin PDF; Karenni Nationalities Defence Force: 2nd Battalion; 3rd Battalion; Karenni National Progressive Party: Karenni Army; Karen National Liberation Army; Karenni Democratic Front; Generation-Z 2021 army

Commanders and leaders
Zaw Myo Tin; Thant Zin Oo	Unknown

Casualties and losses
50+ killed (per KNDF-PDF)	17+ killed (per KNDF)
- 4+ killed, 28+ injured

The 2021 Battle of Loikaw was an engagement between the Tatmadaw against ethnic Karenni militias and local PDF civilian guerrillas. The battle began on 21 May 2021, and was one of the first engagements of the current Myanmar Civil War in Kayah State.

== Prelude ==
Since 1949, ethnic Karenni militias have waged a low-level insurgency in Myanmar's Kayah State, where they make up the majority of the population. While intense clashes broke out between 2010 and 2012, they died down for the most part after democratic leader Aung San Suu Kyi was elected in 2015. The largest Karenni insurgent group, the Karenni Army agreed to a ceasefire deal with central government in 2012 while other main Karenni armed groups such as Karenni National People's Liberation Front and Kayan New Land Party as well as other smaller splinter groups signed ceasefire deals much earlier.

In the city of Loikaw, the capital of Kayah State, massive protests broke out on 8 February 2021, during the initial pushback to the coup. Most of the protests ended peacefully, although over twenty people were injured during some protests and strikes. Many of the initial protests ended on 12 March, after several professors at Loikaw University were detained and tortured, although some strikes continued into April. On 5 May, the Loikaw PDF along with the Demoso PDF were created, and this spread into five PDF groups under the National Unity Government of Myanmar, including the towns of Phruso and Nam Maeng. On 12 May, major protests broke out again, and the threat of disappearance and detainment by junta authorities was more present. A strike on 19 May increased tensions, and caused junta soldiers to be on alert and Loikaw and other formations to arrive in Demoso.

== Battle ==
=== Initial clashes and protests ===
The protests escalated into skirmishes on 20 May, with KNPP fighters and junta troops clashing near Bawlakhe Township. Burmese junta soldiers began arresting civilians en masse, storming churches and monasteries. Civilian guerrillas in the PDF attacked on 21 May, on the road between Loikaw and Demoso. Three junta vehicles were burned, and around thirty soldiers were killed, with only a handful escaping. Throughout the rest of the day, nothing happened, until a bomb went off at the Loikaw Township Hall. No one was injured or killed.

Battles between junta troops and the PDF then occurred in Loikaw city, the road between Loikaw and Demoso, and villages near Mobye. Pekon Township, Shan State. Some battles involved the Karenni National Progressive Party. Battles continued on 22 May, with Loikaw having been bombed throughout the night. In an attack on Hloinko church on 22 May, four people were killed and eight injured. Despite threats from junta soldiers stationed in the area, protests occurred and fizzled out in downtown Loikaw.

=== Fighting intensifies ===
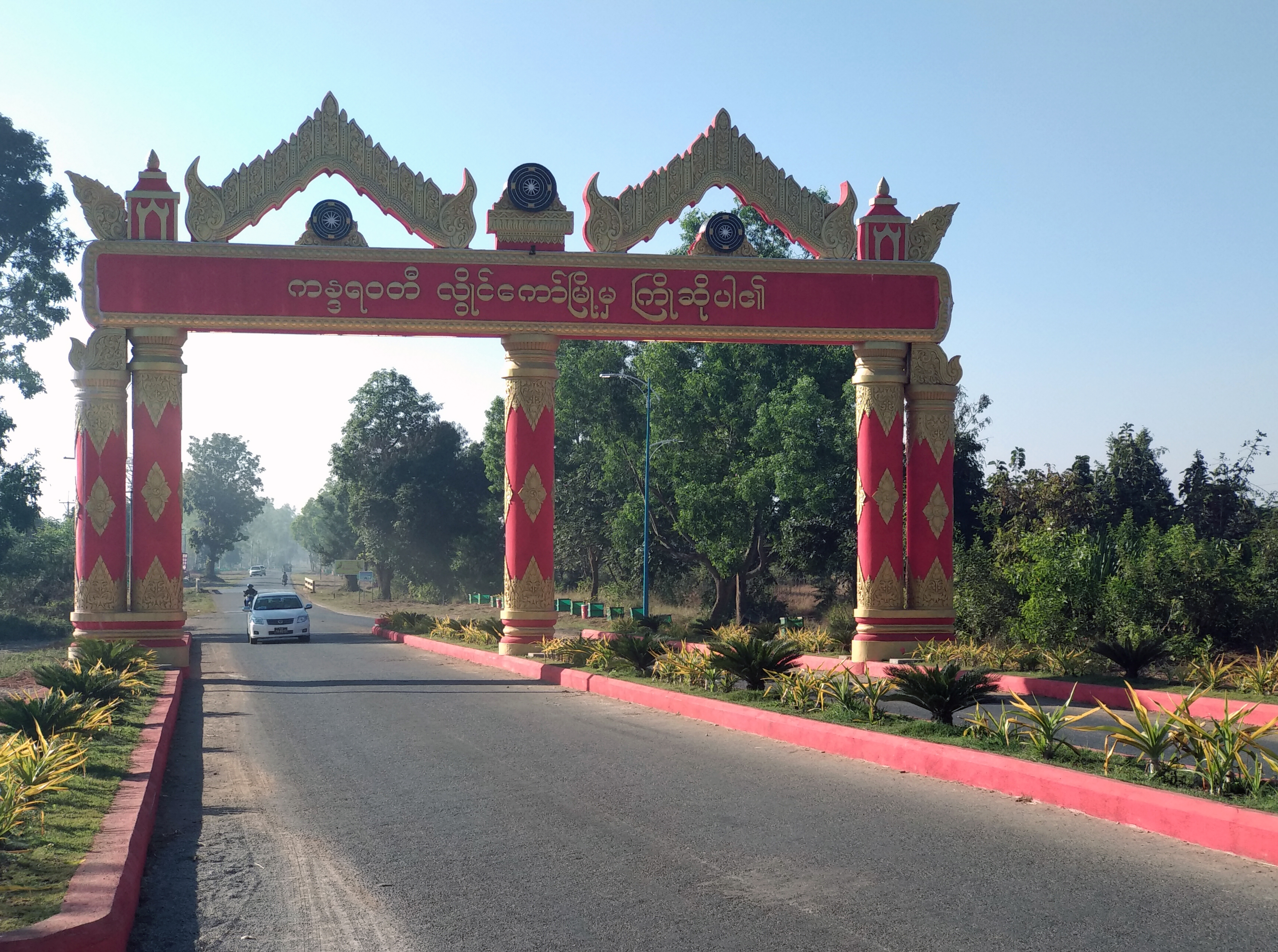
Loikaw city gate

Fighting for Loikaw intensified on 23 May and 25 May, around noon. A group of PDF attacked a gate guarded by junta soldiers near Loikaw, in the village of Pankan. Sixty to seventy junta soldiers were present, along with a helicopter. Much of the villages population either fled or hid in monasteries and churches, some of which were destroyed. According to a humanitarian aid worker, around 1,000 to 2,000 refugees fled Loikaw and Pankan during the first battle. In downtown Loikaw, civilians raided a police station guarded by junta forces. Junta troops then began patrolling other key sites throughout the city. The next day, the Tatmadaw arrested six civilians in Minelon Ward of Loikaw. Nearly every village surrounding Loikaw was a ghost town by 25 May. Fighting subsided on 24 May. The fighting on 21 May killed over fifty junta soldiers by 29 May, and twenty-three civilians were killed during the torching of villages. The KNDF claimed eight PDF and KNDF were killed.

=== Junta secures cities and negotiates ceasefire ===
By late May, around 30,000 people were fleeing Loikaw and Demoso townships. While the route wasn't clear for supply at the time, the Burmese Red Cross announced its plan to send supplies into the two townships to aid the refugees. The junta army blocked traffic into and out of Loikaw on the main roads at 11am on 29 May, along with the road from Loikaw into neighboring Shan State. Local PDF in Loikaw began attacking municipal outposts in the city, preparing to launch an urban guerrilla campaign. By 31 May, most of the PDF had integrated into the Karenni Nationalities Defence Force or army of the Karenni National Progressive Party. Meanwhile, in July and August, junta forces mobilized and added 1,500 soldiers to the 66th and 55th divisions of the Tatmadaw.

In early June, residents of Loikaw stated that there was a shortage of fuel in the city, and that a curfew had been imposed on shopping between 5am and 9am. Most residents of Demoso, Phruso, Mobre, and nearby villages also came to the city to buy goods, as it was impossible for daily life to exist in theirs. A ceasefire was put into effect on 12 June, but some shelling by junta forces occurred in the days after. The ceasefire was still holding up by July, although relations were tense and the junta controlled parts of Loikaw. Fighting briefly resumed on 12 July, after junta troops refused to leave a village under KNPP control. However, by late July, the ceasefire resumed.

== Aftermath ==
=== Clashes resurge and junta offensive ===
Clashes broke out in August, after the KNDF ambushed dozens of junta soldiers in Loikaw. The KNDF claimed to have killed seven junta soldiers and injured ten more, with only one injury sustained on the KNDF side. The junta rejected claims of this attack occurring. Fighting resumed again in the villages outside Loikaw on 28 and 29 August, with 5,000 refugees fleeing and 11 houses being torched. By September, the villages surrounding Loikaw were all ghost towns. On 17 September, the junta launched an offensive into Loikaw from Pekon, in Shan State, and declared the suspension of the ceasefire. Around 300 soldiers in 40 vehicles participated, and fighting broke out in the village of Kon Tha on 29 September. In the battle of Kon Tha, six KNDF troops were killed, along with a number of junta troops. Of the 4,000-5,000 people in Kon Tha, nearly all fled. Junta forces retreated back to Pekon on 30 September.

=== Resecuring of Loikaw ===
By September, no administrative sectors of Loikaw were functioning, although there were some attempts by Karreni groups to restore the hospital. On 6 October, junta forces targeted an ambulance heading towards the Loikaw hospital, killing one person and injuring seven others. A small clash in the village of Nam Bowan also torched ten houses. On 12 October, three civilians were injured from a landmine near Loikaw.

In late October, the National Unity Government of Myanmar was evidenced to be supporting the KNDF financially, according to the KNDF and NUG Minister of Defense Naing Htoo Aung. This came at a time when the KNDF and local PDFs were in dire need of ammunition. Between 2 and 6 November, eighteen junta troops and one Karenni Army soldier was killed in clashes near the village of Sedaw.Around this time, fighting had shifted from the center of Loikaw Township into the border between Shan's Pekon Township and the northwestern border of Loikaw township. Karenni militias and PDF groups had all consolidated under allegiance to the NUG as well.

On 6 November, a junta medic "conducted civil disobedience" in the center of Loikaw with a gun. The KNDF-PDF congratulated the medic, and claimed he had later defected to the KNDF. Small acts of civil disobedience were prevalent around this time, with people throwing grenades at junta-controlled administrative centers. The junta attempted to crack down on this, by banning multiple people riding on motorcycles. On the morning of 22 November, junta forces raided a Catholic church's makeshift hospital in Loikaw, arresting 20 nurses. Loikaw residents objected to the arrests, stating that the care clinic was the only place for medical care in the town, as the Loikaw hospital's services had degraded severely. The arrests were part of a wider campaign from junta troops against Christian churches in Kayah State.

On 3 December, junta troops blocked off the road between Loikaw, Demoso, and Bawlakhe, in anticipation of a battle with the KNDF-PDF. A KNDF official corroborated the reports about an imminent battle, claiming the KNDF-PDF were using forest roads and the junta was using the main road. The official also claimed that the junta was preparing for an offensive, and part of the reason the roads were blocked was to root out possible KNDF fighters or supporters. Fighting began in the village of Konna on 13 December, and restarted in Demoso township again on 16 December. On 18 December, Konna was burnt down during a battle between the KNDF and junta, and parts of the village of Naunglong were set ablaze as well. Fleeing residents claimed that junta troops guarded the fire so as to prevent its extinguishment. On 1 January 2022, rebel forces claimed several Loikaw PDF and KNDF forces were killed in the battles, along with 50 junta troops.

=== Second battle of Loikaw ===
On 6 January 2022, junta forces launched an offensive into Loikaw, although they were unable to push out KNDF and PDF that were embedded in the city's population. Much of the city's population fled after the battle.
