= Burma Independence Army =

Revolutionary army formed in 1941

- ဗမာ့လွတ်လပ်ရေးတပ်မတော်
- First flag of the Burma Independence Army
- Active: 28 December 1941 – September 1945
- Country: State of Burma (until 19 August 1945)
- Allegiance: Empire of Japan (until 27 March 1945); British Empire (after 27 March 1945)
- Role: Regular army (until 19 August 1945), partisan army
- Size: ~11,000–15,000 soldiers
- Engagements: World War II: Burma campaign

Commanders
- Head of State: Ba Maw
- Minister of Defence: Aung San

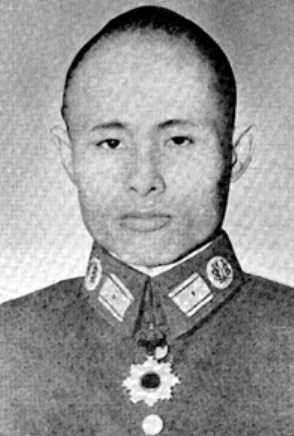
Major General Aung San as Minister of Defence, 1943

The Burma Independence Army (BIA) (Note: Burmese: ဗမာ့အမျိုးသားတပ်မတော်, Burmese pronunciation: [bəma̰ əmjó ðá taʔ mədɔ̀]) was a pro-Japanese and revolutionary army that fought for the end of British rule in Burma by assisting the Japanese in their conquest of the country in 1942 during World War II. It was the first post-colonial army in Burmese history. The BIA was formed from a group known as the Thirty Comrades under the auspices of the Imperial Japanese Army after training the Burmese nationalists in 1941. The BIA's attempts at establishing a government during the invasion led to it being dissolved by the Japanese and the smaller Burma Defence Army (BDA) formed in its place. As Japan guided Burma towards nominal independence, the BDA was expanded into the Burma National Army (BNA) of the State of Burma, a puppet state under Ba Maw, in 1943.

After secret contact with the British during 1944, on 27 March 1945, the BNA revolted against the Japanese. The army received recognition as an ally from Supreme Allied Commander, Lord Mountbatten, who needed their assistance against retreating Japanese forces and to ease the strain between the army's leadership and the British. As part of the Anti-Fascist People's Freedom League, the BNA was re-labelled the Patriotic Burmese Forces (PBF) during a joint Allied–Burmese victory parade in Rangoon on 23 June 1945. Following the war, after tense negotiations, it was decided that the PBF would be integrated into a new Burma Army under British control, but many veterans would continue under old leadership in the paramilitary People's Volunteer Organisation (PVO) in the unstable situation of post-war Burma.

== Background of Burma ==
British rule in Burma began in 1824 after which the British steadily tightened its grip on the country and implemented significant changes to Burmese government and economy compared to Burma under the Konbaung dynasty before. The British removed and exiled King Thibaw Min and separated government from the Buddhist Sangha, with large consequences in the dynamics of Burmese society and was particularly devastating to Buddhist monks who were dependent on the sponsorship of the monarchy. British control increased over time, for example, in 1885 under the Colonial Village Act, all Burmese, except for Buddhist monks, were required to Shikko (a greeting hitherto used only for important elders, monks and the Buddha) to British officials. These greetings would demonstrate Burmese submission and respect to British rule. In addition, the act stated that villages would provide lodging and food upon the arrival of colonial military or civil officials. Lastly, against mounting rebellions, the British adopted a "strategic hamlet" strategy, whereby villages were burned and uprooted families who had supplied villages with Headmen, sending them to lower Burma and replacing them with British approved appointees.

Future changes to Burma included the establishment of land titles, payment of taxes to the British, records of births and deaths and the introduction of census that included personal information, including information pertaining to jobs and religion. The census was especially hard on Burmese identity due to the variation of names and the habit of villagers to move between various families. These traditions were very different from Western culture and not compatible with the British imposed census. British insistence upon western medicine and inoculation was particularly distasteful to native residents of Burma. These changes led to a greater distrust of the British and in turn harsher mandates as they became aware of Burmese resistance.

A major issue in the early 1900s was land alienation by Indian Chettiar moneylenders who were taking advantage of the economic situation in the villages. At the same time, thousands of Indian labourers migrated to Burma and, because of their willingness to work for less money, quickly displaced Burmese farmers, who instead began to take part in crime. All this, combined with Burma's exclusion from British proposals for limited self-government in Indian provinces (of which Burma was part of at the time), led to one of the earliest political nationalist groups, the General Council of Burmese Associations, who had split off from the apolitical Young Men's Buddhist Association. Foreign goods were boycotted and the association set up village courts and rejected the British courts of law claiming that a fair trial had a better chance under the control of Burmese people. Student protests, backed by the Buddhist clergy, also led to "National schools" being created in protest against the colonial education system. As a result, the British to imposed restrictions on free speech and an increase of the police force.

=== Hsaya Rebellion ===
The first major organised armed rebellion occurred between 1930 and 1932 and was called The Hsaya Rebellion. The former monk Hsaya San sparked a rebellion by mobilising peasants in rural Burma after protests against taxes and British disrespect towards Buddhism. The Burmese colonial army under British rule included only minorities such as the Karen, Chin and Kachin and isolated the majority Bamar population. As more people joined the rebellion it evolved into a nationwide revolt which only ended after Hsaya San was captured after two years of insurrection. He and many other rebel leaders were executed and imprisoned after the rebellion was put down. The Hsaya rebellion sparked a large emergence of organised anti-colonial politics in Burma during the 1930s.

== Aung San and Japan ==
Aung San was a nationalist student activist working for the cause of an independent Burma. While at university, he became an influential political leader and created a new platform for educated nationalistic students who were intent upon a Burmese Independent state. In 1938 he joined the radical, anti-colonial Dohbama Asiayone party (known as the Thakins). After the outbreak of the Second World War, the Thakins, combined with the Poor Man's Party to create the Freedom Bloc, which opposed cooperation with the British war effort unless Burma was guaranteed independence immediately after the war and threatened to increase its anti-British and anti-war campaign. The British denied the Freedom Bloc's demands and much of its leadership was imprisoned until after the Japanese invasion in 1942. The Thakins looked elsewhere for support and planned on setting up ties with the Chinese communists. Aung San flew to China in 1940, intent to make contact with them in order to discuss investments into an independent Burmese Army. In 1940, the Japanese military interest in Southeast Asia had increased, the British were overtly providing military assistance to Nationalist China against which Japan was fighting in the Second Sino-Japanese War. In particular, they were sending war materials via the newly opened Burma Road. Colonel Keiji Suzuki, a staff officer at the Imperial General Headquarters in Japan, was given the task of devising a strategy for dealing with Southeast Asia and he produced a plan for clandestine operations in Burma. The Japanese knew little about Burma at the time and had few contacts within the country. The top Japanese agent in the country was Naval Reservist Kokubu Shozo, who had been resident there for several years and had contacts with most of the anti-British political groups. Suzuki visited Burma secretly, posing as a journalist for the Yomiuri Shimbun under the name Masuyo Minami, in September 1940, meeting with political leaders Thakin Kodaw Hmaing and Thakin Mya. The Japanese later made contact with Aung San in China who had reached Amoy when he was detained by Suzuki. Suzuki and Aung San flew to Tokyo. After discussions at the Imperial General Headquarters, it was decided in February 1941 to form an organisation named Minami Kikan, which was to support Burmese resistance groups and to close the Burma Road to China. In pursuing those goals, it would recruit potential independence fighters in Burma and train them in Japan's ally Thailand or Japanese occupied China. Aung San and 29 others, the future officers and core of the Burma Independence Army, known as the Thirty Comrades, left Burma in April 1941 and were trained on Hainan Island in leadership, espionage, guerrilla warfare and political tactics. Colonel Suzuki assumed the Burmese name "Bo Mo Gyo" (Commander Thunderbolt), for his work with Minami Kikan.

== Formation and action of the Burma Independence Army ==
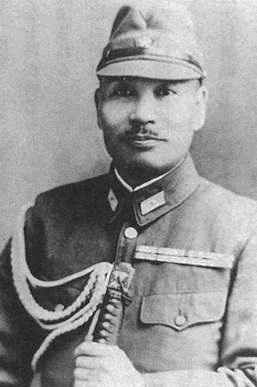
Keiji Suzuki as Major General

On 7 December 1941, Japan attacked the United States and Britain. On 28 December, at a ceremony in Bangkok, the Burma Independence Army (BIA) was officially formed. The Thirty Comrades, as well as Colonel Suzuki, had their blood drawn from their arms in syringes, then poured into a silver bowl and mixed with liquor from which each of them drank – thway thauk in time-honoured Burmese military tradition – pledging "eternal loyalty" among themselves and to the cause of Burmese independence. The BIA initially numbered 227 Burmese and 74 Japanese. Some of the Burmese soldiers were second-generation residents in Thailand, who could not speak Burmese.

The BIA formed was broken into six units which were assigned to participate in the invasion of Burma in January 1942, initially as intelligence-gatherers, saboteurs and foragers. The leader of the Burma Independence Army were declared with Keiji Suzuki as Commander-in-Chief, with Aung San as Senior Staff Officer. When the army entered into Burma it was made up of 2,300 men and organised in the following way.

Unit	Commanders	Task
First & Second	Keiji Suzuki, Aung San, Set Kya and Thakin Tun Oke.	Would take the Mae Sot route into Burma as combat teams with most of the Japanese forces
Third	Bo Ne Win and Lt. Tanaka	Would infiltrate Rangoon and move into Burma for guerilla actions
Fourth	Bo Hpone Myint	Would go together with the Japanese 55th Division and carry out relations with the Burmese people
Fifth	Bo Let Ya, Bo La Yaung, and Captain Kawashima	Would enter Burma from Nat Eidaung near Tavoy
Sixth	Bo Yan Naing, Bo Lin Yone, Bo Min Gaung, and Lt. Hirayama.	Would go through Ranong and enter at Victoria Point, the southern tip of Burma

As the Japanese and the BIA entered Burma, the BIA gained a lot of support from the civilian population and were bolstered by many Bamar volunteers. This caused their numbers to grow to such a level that by the time the Japanese forces reached Rangoon on 8 March, the BIA numbered 10,000–12,000, and eventually expanded to between 18,000 and 23,000. Many of the volunteers who joined the BIA were however not officially recruited, but rather officials or even criminal gangs who took to calling themselves BIA to further their own activities. The Japanese provided few weapons to the BIA, but they armed themselves from abandoned or captured British weapons. With the help of a propaganda campaign from the BIA, Suzuki was welcomed by the Burmese people since word was spread that "Bo Mo Gyo" (Suzuki) was a decedent of the Prince of Myingun, a Burmese prince in the direct line of succession to the Burmese throne who had been exiled after a failed rebellion to Saigon, where he died in 1923. Propaganda claiming that Bo Mo Gyo was to lead the resistance into restoring the throne soon spread throughout Burma, which helped to provide a format for the Burmese villagers to accept the involvement of Japanese help in overthrowing the British.

Throughout the invasion, the swelling numbers of the BIA were involved in attacks on minority populations (particularly the Karens) and preyed on Indian refugees fleeing from the Japanese. The worst atrocities against the Karens in the Irrawaddy Delta south of Rangoon cannot however be attributed to dacoits or unorganised recruits, but rather the actions of a subset of regular BIA and their Japanese officers. Elements of the BIA in Irrawaddy destroyed 400 Karen villages with a death toll reaching 1,800. In one instance, which was also described in Kyaw Zaw's, one of the Thirty Comrades, memoirs, Colonel Suzuki personally ordered the BIA to destroy two large Karen villages and killing all within as an act of retribution after one of his officers was killed in an attack by anti-Japanese resistance.

=== Battle of Shwedaung ===
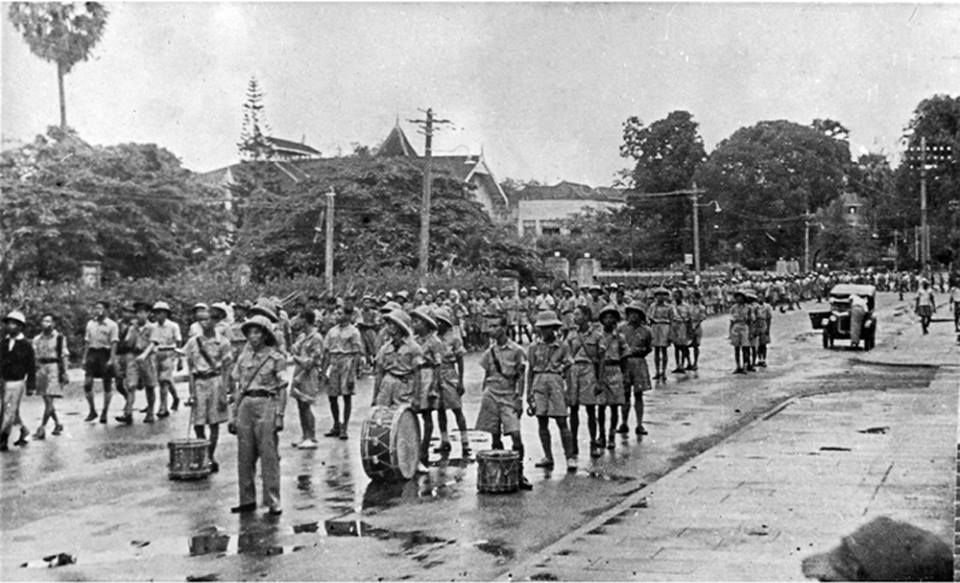
The Burma Independence Army enter Rangoon in early 1942

One action in which the BIA played a major part was at Shwedaung, near Prome, in Southern Burma. On 29 March 1942, a detachment from the British 7th Armoured Brigade commanded by Brigadier John Henry Anstice was retreating from nearby Paungde. Another detachment of two Indian battalions was sent to clear Shwedaung, which lay on Anstice's line of retreat and was held by the II Battalion of the Japanese 215th Regiment, commanded by Major Misao Sato, and 1,300 men belonging to the BIA under Bo Yan Naing, one of the Thirty Comrades. Two Japanese liaison officers named Hirayama and Ikeda accompanied the BIA. With Anstice's force and the Indian troops attacking Shwedaung from two sides, the roadblocks were soon cleared, but a lucky shot from a Japanese anti-tank gun knocked out a tank on a vital bridge and forced the British to retreat across open fields where Bo Yan Naing ambushed them with 400 men. Eventually the British and Indian force broke free and continued their retreat, having lost ten tanks, two field guns and 350 men killed or wounded. The BIA's casualties were heavy; 60 killed, 300 wounded, 60 captured and 350 missing, who had deserted. Hirayama and Ikeda were both killed. Most of the BIA's casualties resulted from inexperience and lack of equipment. Though Burmese political leader Ba Maw and others later eulogised the BIA's participation in the battle, the official Japanese history never mentioned them.

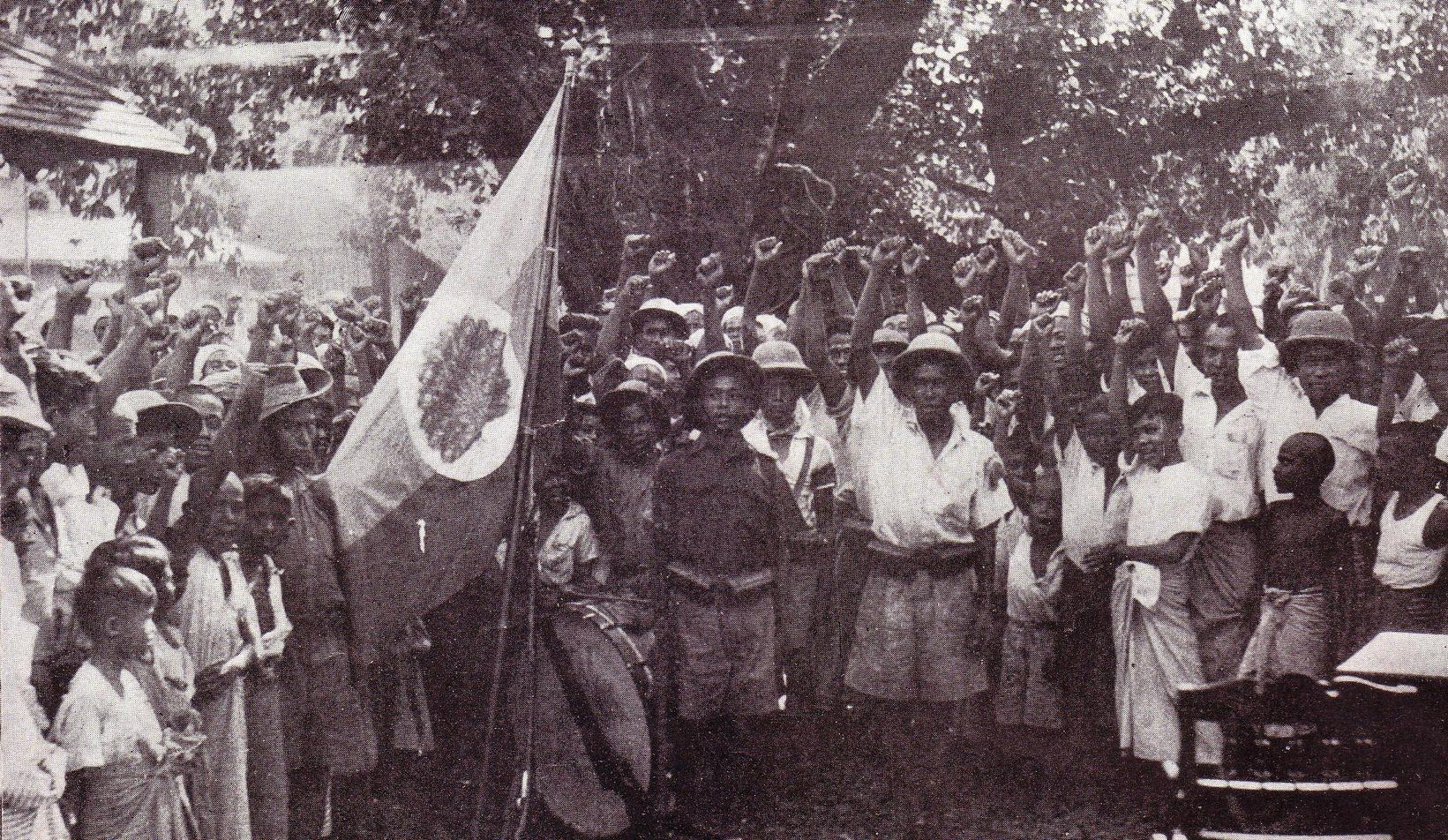
Burmese people and soldiers of the BIA with their flag

=== Tension between the Japanese and BIA ===
Second flag of the Burma Independence Army

As the invasion speedily continued in Japan's favour, more and more territory fell into Japanese hands who disregarded the agreement for Burma's independence. As the BIA's ranks had swelled with thousands of unorganised army and volunteers, with plenty of weapons spread throughout the country which led to widespread chaos, looting and killings were common. The Japanese army command formed an administration on their own terms and the commanders of the Fifteenth Army began undermining the creation of a Burmese government. Thakin Tun Oke had been selected to be the political administrator and government organiser. BIA attempted to form local governments in Burma. Attempts over the administration of Moulmein, the Japanese 55th Division had flatly refused Burmese requests and even forbade them to enter the town. Many in the BIA considered the Japanese suppression of them to be based on notions of racial superiority. However, the BIA's attempts at creating a government were dared by Colonel Suzuki, who said to U Nu that:

"Independence is not the kind of thing you can get by begging for it from other people. You should proclaim it yourselves. The Japanese refuse to give it? Very well then, tell them that you will cross over to someplace like Twante and proclaim it and set up your government. What's the difficulty about that? If they start shooting, you shoot back."

Aung San tried to establish a training school in Bhamo. His efforts were too late and interrupted by the Kempeitai. After the Japanese invasion of Burma the Japanese Commander of the 15th Army, Lieutenant-General Shōjirō Iida, recalled Suzuki to Japan. In its place the Japanese created civil organisations designed to guide Burma toward puppet state. the BIA was disarmed and disbanded on 24 July. Now the Burma Defence Army (BDA), placed under the command of Colonel Aung San with Bo Let Ya as Chief of Staff, led by several Japanese commanders. An officers' training school was established in Mingaladon and the new force of 3,000 men were recruited and trained by Japanese instructors as regular army battalions instead of a guerrilla force during the second half of 1942. After the change in leadership, Aung Sun tried to push for what he considered the true mission of the army, which was not just a military group composed of the Thakins, but an army of "true patriots irrespective of political creed or race and dedicated to national independence".

== Transition into the Burma National Army ==
Flag of the Thakins, which was commonly used by the BIA and later adopted as the flag of the State of Burma (1943–1945)

After a year of occupation, on 1 August 1943, the newly created State of Burma was granted nominal independence by Japan and became a member of the Greater East Asia Co-Prosperity Sphere. Its Head of State became Dr. Ba Maw, an outspoken anti-colonial politician imprisoned by the British before the war. Aung San became Minister of Defence in the new regime, with the new rank of Major General and Bo Let Ya as his Deputy. Bo Ne Win (who would much later become the dictator of Burma after World War II) became Commander-in-Chief of the expanded Burma National Army (BNA). The BNA eventually consisted of seven battalions of infantry and a variety of supporting units with a strength which grew to around 11,000–15,000 men. Most were from the majority Bamar population, but there was one battalion raised from the Karen minority.

Although Burma was nominally self-governing, the power of the State of Burma to exercise its sovereignty was largely circumscribed by wartime agreements with Japan. The Imperial Japanese Army maintained a large presence and continued to act arbitrarily, despite Japan no longer having official control over Burma. The resulting hardships and Japanese militaristic attitudes turned the majority Burman population against the Japanese. The insensitive attitude of the Japanese Army extended to the BNA. Even the officers of the BNA were obliged to salute low-ranking privates of the Imperial Japanese Army as their superiors. Aung San soon became disillusioned about Japanese promises of true independence and of Japan's ability to win the war. As the British General in the Burma Campaign William Slim put it:

"It was not long before Aung San found that what he meant by independence had little relation to what the Japanese were prepared to give—that he had exchanged an old master for an infinitely more tyrannical new one. As one of his leading followers once said to me, "If the British sucked our blood, the Japanese ground our bones!"

== Change of sides ==
During 1944, the BNA made contacts with other political groups inside Burma, such as the communists who had taken to the hills in the initial invasion. In August 1944, a popular front organisation called the Anti-Fascist Organisation (AFO) was formed with Thakin Soe, a founding member of the Communist Party of Burma, as leader. Through the communists, Aung San were eventually able to make contact with the British Force 136 in India. The initial contacts were always indirect. Force 136 was also able to make contacts with members of the BNA's Karen unit in Rangoon through agents dropped by parachute into the Karenni State, the Karen-populated area in the east of Burma. In December 1944, the AFO contacted the Allies indicating their readiness to launch a national uprising which would include the BNA. The situation was not immediately considered favourable by the British for a revolt by the BNA and there were internal disputes about supporting the BNA among them; the British had reservations over dealing with Aung San. In contrast to Force 136, Civil Affair officers of Lord Mountbatten in the South East Asia Command (SEAC) wanted him tried for war crimes, including a 1942 murder case in which he had personally executed a civilian, the Headman of Thebyugone village, in front of a large crowd. General William Slim later wrote:

"I would accept [Aung San's] help and that of his army only on the clear understanding that it implied no recognition of any provisional government. ... The British Government had announced its intention to grant self-government to Burma within the British Commonwealth, and we had better limit our discussion to the best method of throwing the Japanese out of the country as the next step toward self-government."

In late March 1945, the BNA paraded in Rangoon and marched out ostensibly to take part in the battles then raging in Central Burma. Instead, on 27 March, they openly declared war on the Japanese and rose up in a country-wide rebellion. BNA units were deployed all over the country under ten different regional commands (see table below). Those near the British front-lines around the Irrawaddy River requested arms and supplies from Allied units operating in this area. They also seized control of the civil institutions in most of the main towns. 27 March is now marked as Armed Forces Day, a national holiday in Myanmar. Aung San and others subsequently began negotiations with Mountbatten and officially joined the Allies as the Patriotic Burmese Forces (PBF) on 23 June 1945. At the first meeting, the AFO represented itself to the British as the provisional government of Burma with Thakin Soe as chairman and Aung San as a member of its ruling committee.

Region	Geography	Military commander	Political adviser
No. 1	Prome, Henzada, Tharrawaddy, Insein	Aung San	Thakin Ba Hein
No. 2	Pyapon, eastern Irrawaddy Delta	Ne Win (Note: One of the Thirty Comrades)	Thakin Soe
No. 3	Western Irrawaddy Delta	Saw Kyar Doe (Note: A Karen Ethnicity)	
No. 4	Hanthawaddy, south of Toungoo	Kyaw Zaw	Thakin Chit (Note: Leader of the Burma Socialist Party)
No. 5	Tavoy–Mergui	Tin Tun	Thakin Ba Thein Tin (Note: Member of the Communist Party of Burma)
No. 6	Pyinmana–Meiktila	Bo Ye Htut	Thakin Kyaw Nyein
No. 7	Thayet–Minbu	Bo Hmu Aung	Thakin Tin Mya
No. 8	Upper Burma	Bo Ba Htoo	

== Aftermath ==
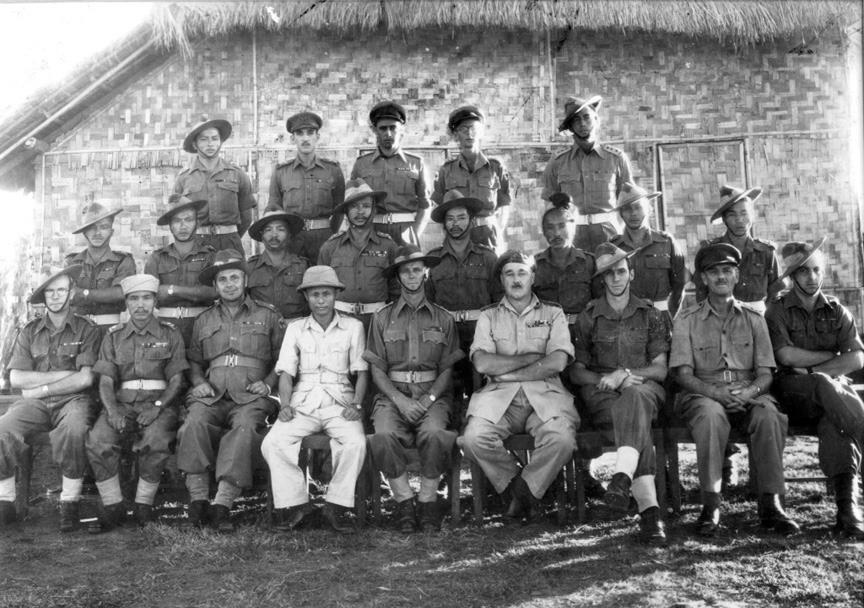
Aung San (in bright khaki) with British officers

The Japanese were routed from most of Burma by May 1945. Negotiations then began with the British over the disarming of the AFO, which earlier in March the same year had been transformed into a united front comprising the Patriotic Burmese Forces, the Communists and the Socialists, and renamed the Anti-Fascist People's Freedom League (AFPFL). Had the British Governor of Burma, Reginald Dorman-Smith, still in exile in Simla, and General William Slim gotten their way, the BNA would have been declared illegal and dissolved. Aung San would have been arrested as a traitor for his cooperation with the Japanese and charged with war crimes. However, Supreme Allied Commander Louis Mountbatten was anxious to avoid a civil war and to secure the cooperation of Aung San, who had authority over thousands of highly politicised troops.

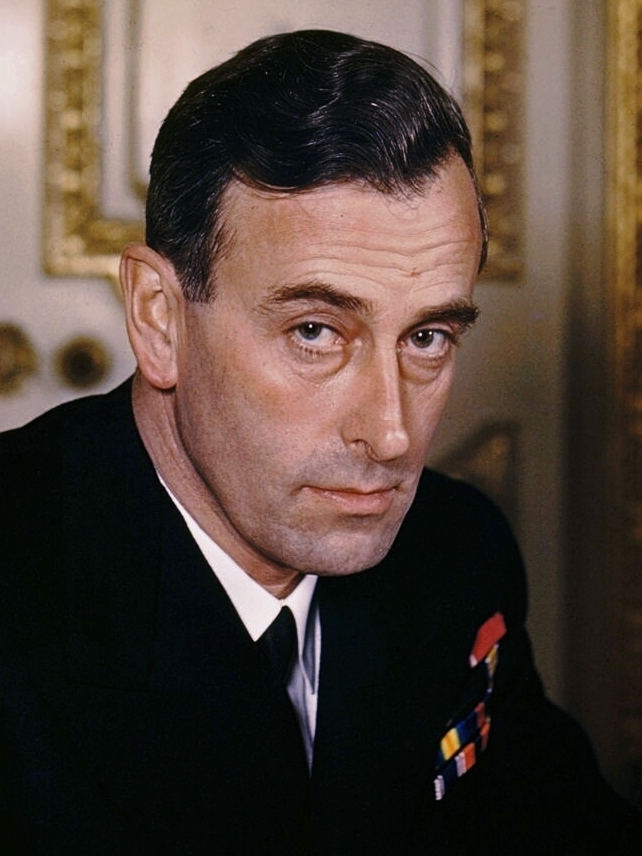
Louis Mountbatten, Supreme Allied Commander in Southeast Asia

When the British noticed with alarm that PBF troops were withholding weapons, ready to go underground, tense negotiations in a conference in Kandy, Ceylon, were held in September 1945. Aung San, six PBF commanders and four political representatives of the AFPFL met with the Supreme Allied Command were Lord Mountbatten acknowledged the BNA's contribution the victory in Burma to ease tensions. The British offered for around 5,000 veterans and 200 officers of the PBF to form the core of a post-war Burma Army under British command into which colonial Karen, Kachin, and Chin battalions would be integrated. In the end, only a small number of PBF troops were selected for the army, with most being sent home with two months pay.

Aung San was offered the rank of Deputy Inspector General of the Burma Army, but which he declined upon the return of Governor Dorman-Smith's government. Bo Let Ya instead got the position while Aung San became a civilian political leader in the AFPFL and the leader of the People's Volunteer Organisation (PVO), ostensibly a veterans organisation for ex-BNA, but in reality, a paramilitary force who were openly drilling in uniform with numbers eventually reaching 50,000. It was to replace the BNA as a major deterrence against both the British and his communist rivals in the AFPFL. Aung San became head of the AFPFL in 1946 and continued the more peaceful struggle for Burmese independence until his assassination after the overwhelming victory of the AFPFL in the April 1947 constituent assembly elections. Burma finally became independent on 4 January 1948.

=== Significance of the Burma Independence Army today ===
The BIA was the first major step of the towards Burmese independence without colonial powers involved, even though this result never genuinely occurred under the BIA or its successors. The army's formation helped to create strong ties between the military and the government which are still present within Burmese society today. In addition, the BIA did achieve results in its need to unite the Burmese as a single nation instead of many different smaller states. Many scholars attribute the failure of the BIA due to the lack of resources, lack of strong administrative control and the failure to include both the highland and lowland regions of Burma. However, the BIA became the first truly national Burmese army and remains honoured in Burma today, with Aung San and many of the Thirty Comrades being seen as national heroes.

== See also ==
- State of Burma
- Burma Campaign
- Indian National Army
- Anti-Fascist People's Freedom League
- Thirty Comrades

== Bibliography ==
- Allen, Louis (1984). Burma: The Longest War 1941–45. J.M. Dent and Sons. ISBN 0-460-02474-4.
- Bayly, Christopher; Tim Harper (2005). Forgotten Armies. London: Penguin. ISBN 0-14-029331-0.
- Callahan, Mary P. (2003). Making Enemies. Cornell University Press.
- Carey, Peter (1997). Burma : the challenge of change in a divided society. New York: Macmillan Press. p. 5.
- Charney, Michael (2009). A History Of Modern Burma. United Kingdom: Cambridge University Press.
- Fredholm, Michael (1993). Burma: Ethnicity and Insurgency. Westport: Praeger Publishers.
- Latimer, Jon (2004). Burma: The Forgotten War. John Murray. ISBN 978-0-7195-6576-2.
- Lintner, Bertil (1990). The Rise and Fall of the Communist Party of Burma (CPB). Cornell Southeast Asia Program. ISBN 0-87727-123-2.
- Naw, Angelene (2001). Aung Sun and The Struggle for Burmese Independence. Thailand: Silkworm Books.
- Silverstein, Josef (1977). Burma: Military Rule and the Politics of Stagnation. Cornell University Press.
- Smith, Martin (1991). Burma: Insurgency and the Politics of Ethnicity. London and New Jersey: Zed Books Ltd.
- Suu Kyi, Aung San (1984). Aung San. Queensland Press.
- Tucker, Shelby (2000). Among Insurgents. Penguin Books.
