= Henry Foley Knight =

British administrator and civil servant

Sir Henry Foley Knight KCSI CIE

Governor of Madras Presidency (acting)
- In office 26 February 1946 – 5 May 1946
- Governor-General: Archibald Wavell, 1st Earl Wavell
- Premier: Tanguturi Prakasam
- Preceded by: Arthur Hope, 2nd Baron Rankeillour
- Succeeded by: Archibald Nye

Personal details
- Born: 19 January 1886 United Kingdom
- Died: United Kingdom
- Spouse: Jesse Spence Duncan
- Profession: Civil servant

Sir Henry Foley Knight KCSI CIE (b. 19 January 1886 - d. 8 July 1960) was a British administrator and civil servant who served as the Acting Governor of Madras in 1946.

== Early life ==
Henry Foley Knight was born to John Henry Knight and Elizabeth Bligh Foley in Farnham on 19 January 1886. He graduated from Caius College, Cambridge and in 1909, passed the Indian Civil Service examinations.

== Career ==
In 1910, Foley was sent to India as an Assistant Collector and Magistrate in Bombay Presidency. He served in the army during the First World War and as an Indian Army Reserve Officer from 1916 to 1919. Between 1919 and 1920, Foley served as an Under Secretary and then, Deputy Secretary of the Revenue and Financial Department of the Government of Bombay.

From 1939 to 1945, he served as Adviser to the Governor of Bombay Presidency in charge of finance, food, agriculture, and rural development.

He served as acting Governor of Bombay from March to May 1945; acting Governor of Burma from June to August 1945; acting Governor of Madras February to May 1946 and acting Governor of Burma from June to August 1946.

Returning to Great Britain in 1947, he served as Adviser to the Secretary of State for India.

== Family ==
Knight married Jesse Spence Bell in 1926 in Bombay, India and had one son and one daughter. Knight died in Rotterdam on 8 July 1960.
