= History of Myanmar =

The history of Myanmar (Burmese: မြန်မာ့သမိုင်း Myănma thămāing) covers the period from the time of first-known human settlements 13,000 years ago to the present day. Native to three imperial dynasties of South-east asia, the history of Myanmar is intertwined with the socio-political and cultural developments in the region over the past millennium. The earliest inhabitants of recorded history were Tibeto-Burman-speaking people who established an array of Pyu city-states that ranged as far south as Pyay and adopted Theravada Buddhism.

Another group, the Bamar people, entered the upper Irrawaddy valley in the early 9th century. They went on to establish the Pagan Kingdom (1044–1297), the first-ever unification of the Irrawaddy valley and its periphery. The Burmese language and culture slowly came to replace Pyu norms during this period. After the First Mongol invasion of Burma in 1287, several small kingdoms, of which the Kingdom of Ava, the Hanthawaddy kingdom, the Kingdom of Mrauk U and the Shan States were principal powers, came to dominate the landscape, replete with ever-shifting alliances and constant wars. From this time, the history of this region has been characterised by geopolitical struggles between the Bamar ethnic group, and the multitude of smaller ethnic groups surrounding them.

In the second half of the 16th century, the Toungoo dynasty (1510–1752) reunified the country, and founded the largest empire in the history of Southeast Asia for a brief period. Later Toungoo kings instituted several key administrative and economic reforms that gave rise to a smaller, more peaceful and prosperous kingdom in the 17th and early 18th centuries. In the second half of the 18th century, the Konbaung dynasty (1752–1885) restored the kingdom, and continued the Toungoo reforms that increased central rule in peripheral regions and produced one of the most literate states in Asia. The dynasty also went to war with all its neighbors. The Anglo-Burmese wars (1824–85) eventually led to British colonial rule.

British rule brought several enduring social, economic, cultural and administrative changes that completely transformed the once-agrarian society. British rule highlighted out-group differences among the country's myriad ethnic groups. Since independence in 1948, the country has been in one of the longest running civil wars involving insurgent groups representing political and ethnic minority groups and successive central governments. The country was under military rule under various guises from 1962 to 2010 and again from 2021–present, and in the seemingly cyclical process has become one of the least developed nations in the world.

== Early history (to the 9th century) ==
=== Prehistory ===
The earliest archaeological evidence suggests that cultures existed in Burma as early as 11,000 BCE. Most indications of early settlement have been found in the central dry zone, where scattered sites appear in close proximity to the Irrawaddy River. The Anyathian, Burma's Stone Age, existed at a time thought to parallel the Lower Paleolithic and Middle Paleolithic in Europe. The Neolithic or New Stone Age, when plants and animals were first domesticated and polished stone tools appeared, is evidenced in Burma by three caves located near Taunggyi at the edge of the Shan plateau that are dated from 10000 to 6000 BC.

About 1500 BCE, people in the region were turning copper into bronze, growing rice, and domesticating chickens and pigs; they were among the first people in the world to do so. By 500 BCE, iron-working settlements emerged in an area south of present-day Mandalay. Bronze-decorated coffins and burial sites filled with earthenware remains have been excavated. Archaeological evidence at Samon Valley south of Mandalay suggests rice growing settlements that traded with China between 500 BC and 200 CE. During the Iron Age, archaeological evidence also out of Samon Valley reveals changes in infant burial practices that were greatly influenced by India. These changes include burying infants in jars whose size depicts their family status.

=== Pyu city-states ===
Pyu city-states

Major Pyu city-states

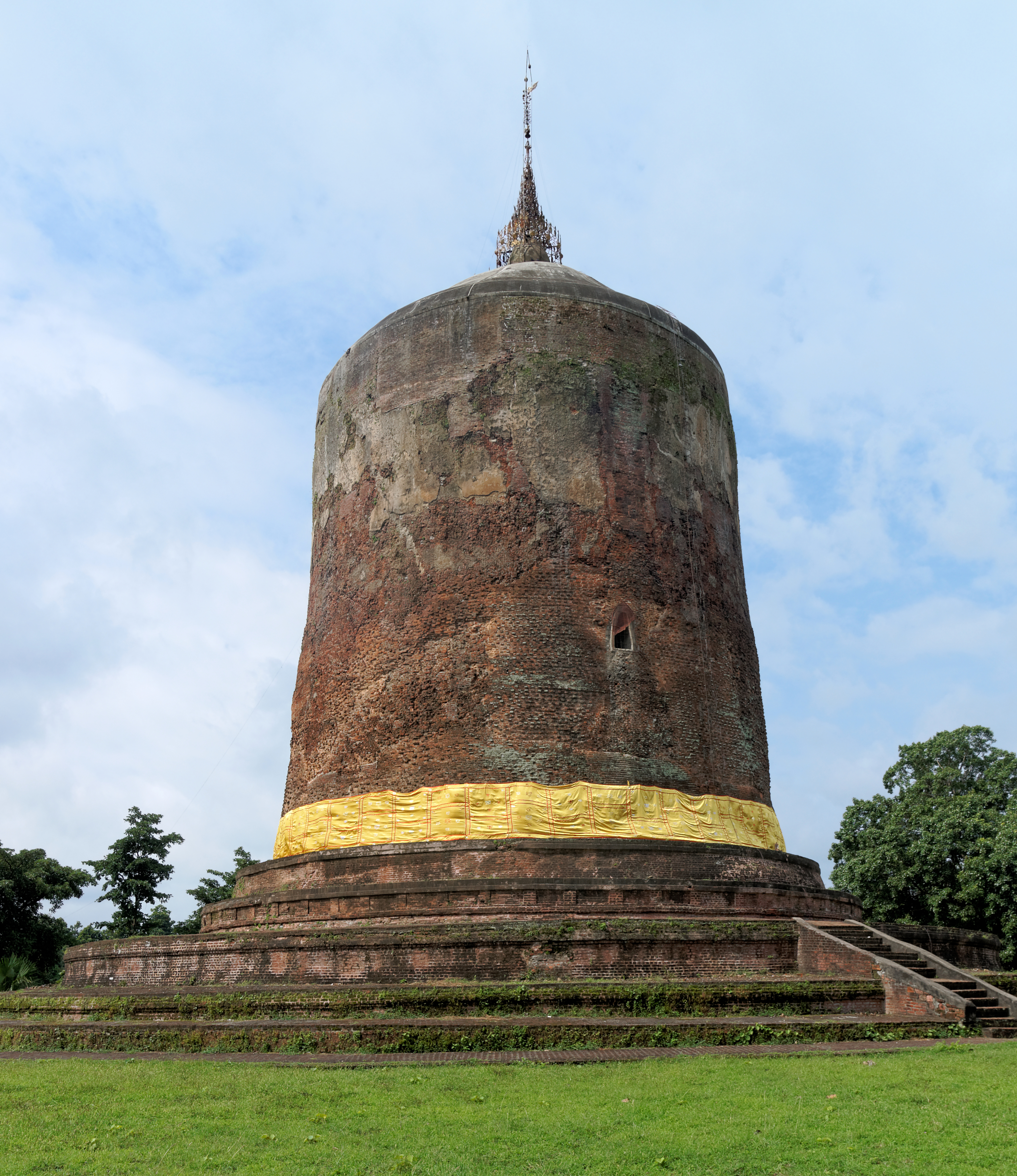
Bawbawgyi Pagoda at Sri Ksetra, prototype of Pagan-era pagodas.

The Pyu entered the Irrawaddy valley from present-day Yunnan, c. 2nd century BCE, and went on to found city-states throughout the Irrawaddy valley. The original home of the Pyu is reconstructed to be Qinghai Lake in present-day Qinghai and Gansu. The Pyu were the earliest inhabitants of Burma of whom records are extant. During this period, Burma was part of an overland trade route from China to India. Trade with India brought Buddhism from India, and by the 4th century, many in the Irrawaddy valley had converted to Buddhism. Of the many city-states, the largest and most important was the Sri Ksetra Kingdom southeast of modern Pyay, also thought to once be the capital city. In March 638, the Pyu of Sri Ksetra launched a new calendar that later became the Burmese calendar.

Eighth-century Chinese records identify 18 Pyu states throughout the Irrawaddy valley, and describe the Pyu as a humane and peaceful people to whom war was virtually unknown and who wore silk cotton instead of actual silk so that they would not have to kill silkworms. The Chinese records also report that the Pyu knew how to make astronomical calculations, and that many Pyu boys entered the monastic life at seven to the age of 20.

It was a long-lasting civilisation that lasted nearly a millennium until the early 9th century, when a new group of "swift horsemen" from the north, the Bamars, entered the upper Irrawaddy valley. In the early 9th century, the Pyu city-states of Upper Burma came under constant attacks by Nanzhao (in modern Yunnan). In 832, the Nanzhao sacked Halingyi, which had overtaken Prome as the chief Pyu city-state and informal capital. Archaeologists interpret early Chinese texts detailing the plundering of Halingyi in 832 to detail the capturing of 3000 Pyu prisoners, later becoming Nanzhao slaves at Kunming.

While Pyu settlements remained in Upper Burma until the advent of the Pagan Empire in the mid 11th century, the Pyu were gradually absorbed into the expanding Burman kingdom of Pagan in the next four centuries. The Pyu language still existed until the late 12th century. By the 13th century, the Pyu had assumed Bamar ethnicity. The histories/legends of the Pyu were also incorporated into those of the Bamars.

=== Mon kingdoms ===
According to the colonial era scholarship, as early as the 6th century, another people called the Mon began to enter the present-day Lower Burma from the Mon kingdoms of Haribhunjaya and Dvaravati in modern-day Thailand. By the mid 9th century, the Mon had founded at least two small kingdoms (or large city-states) centred around Bago (Pegu) and Thaton. The earliest external reference to a Mon kingdom in Lower Burma was in 844–848 by Arab geographers. But recent research shows that there is no evidence (archaeological or otherwise) to support colonial period conjectures that a Mon-speaking polity existed in Lower Burma until the late 13th century, and the first recorded claim that the kingdom of Thaton existed came only in 1479.

== Pagan dynasty (849–1297) ==
=== Early Pagan ===
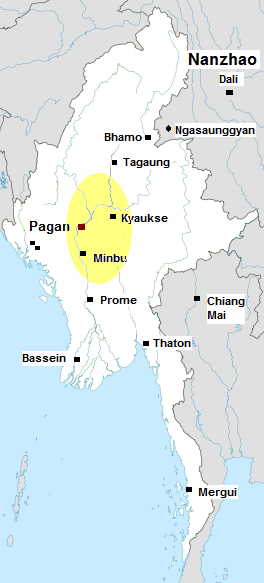
Principality of Pagan at Anawrahta's accession in 1044 CE.

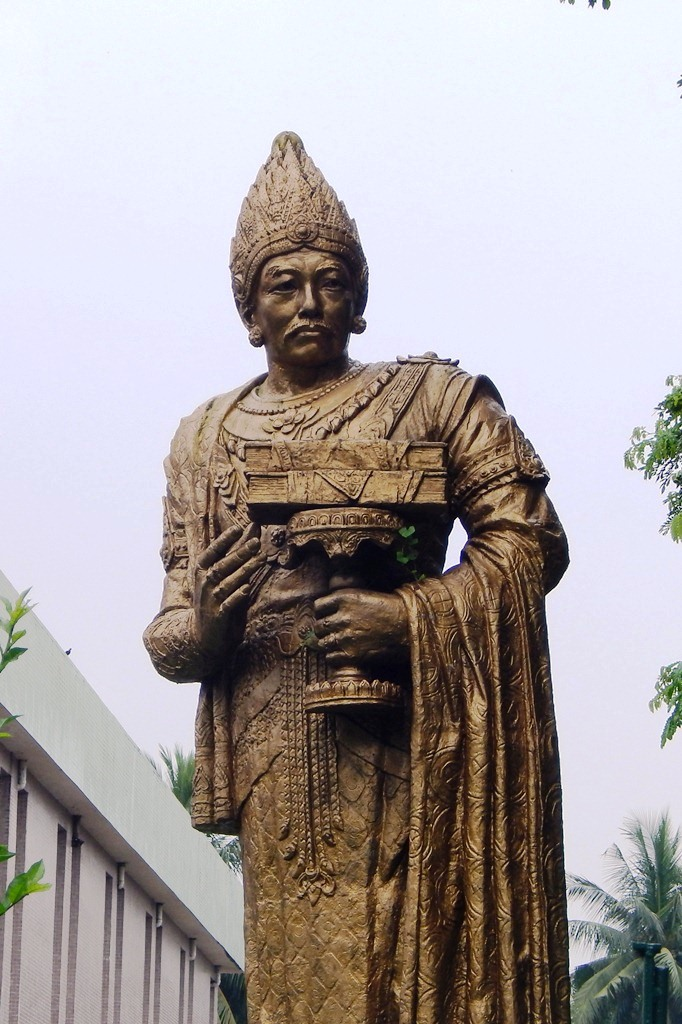
Anawrahta was the founder of the Pagan Kingdom.

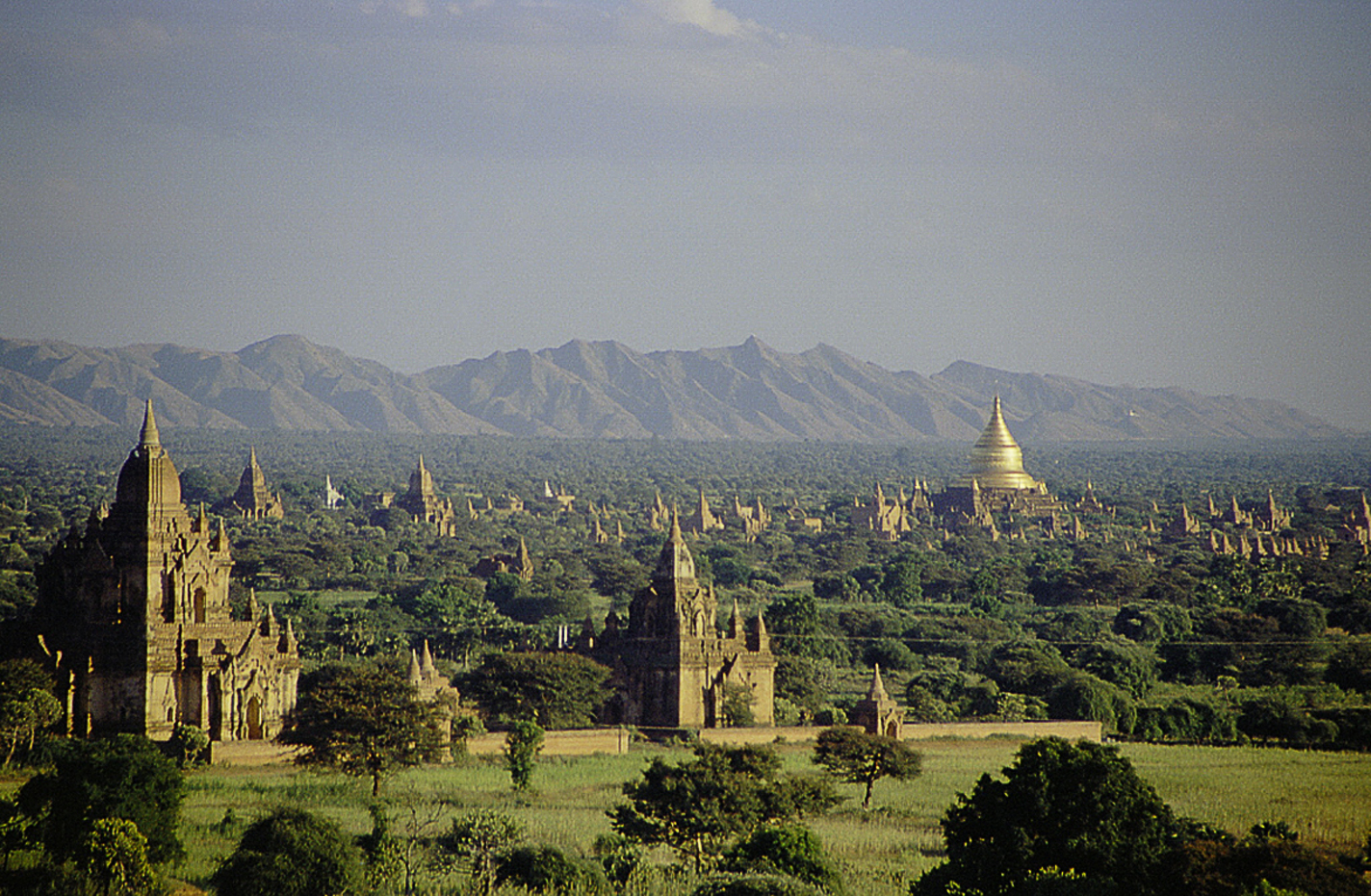
Pagodas and kyaungs in present-day Bagan, the capital of the Pagan Kingdom.

The Burmans who had come down with the 9th-century Nanzhao raids of the Pyu states remained in Upper Burma. (Trickles of Burman migrations into the upper Irrawaddy valley might have begun as early as the 7th century.) In the mid-to-late 9th century, Pagan was founded as a fortified settlement along a strategic location on the Irrawaddy near the confluence of the Irrawaddy and its main tributary, the Chindwin River.

It may have been designed to help the Nanzhao pacify the surrounding countryside. Over the next two hundred years, the small principality gradually grew to include its immediate surrounding areas, to about 200 miles north to south and 80 miles from east to west by Anawrahta's accession in 1044.

=== Pagan Empire (1044–1297) ===
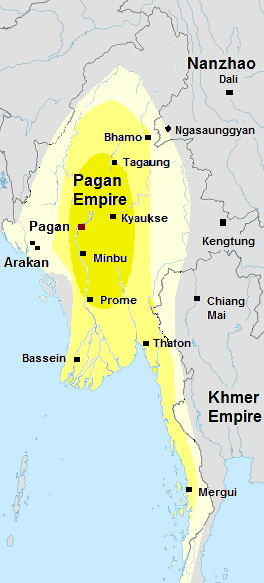
Pagan Kingdom during Narapatisithu's reign. Burmese chronicles also claim Kengtung and Chiang Mai. Core areas shown in darker yellow. Peripheral areas in light yellow. Pagan incorporated key ports of Lower Burma into its core administration by the 13th century.

Over the next 30 years, Anawrahta founded the Pagan Kingdom, unifying for the first time the regions that would later constitute modern-day Burma. Anawrahta's successors by the late 12th century had extended their influence farther south into the upper Malay Peninsula, at least to the Salween River in the east, below the current China border in the farther north, and to the west, northern Arakan and the Chin Hills. The Burmese Chronicles claim Pagan's suzerainty over the entire Chao Phraya Valley, and the Thai chronicles include the lower Malay Peninsula down to the Strait of Malacca to Pagan's realm.

By the early 12th century, Pagan had emerged as a major power alongside the Khmer Empire in Southeast Asia, recognised by Song China and the Chola dynasty of India. Well into the mid-13th century, most of mainland Southeast Asia was under some degree of control of either the Pagan Empire or the Khmer Empire.

Anawrahta also implemented a series of key social, religious, and economic reforms that would have a lasting impact on Burmese history. His social and religious reforms later developed into the modern-day culture of Myanmar. The most important development was the introduction of Theravada Buddhism to Upper Burma after Pagan's conquest of the Thaton Kingdom in 1057. Supported by royal patronage, the Buddhist school gradually spread to the village level in the next three centuries, although Vajrayana Buddhist, Mahayana, Hindu, and animism remained heavily entrenched at all social strata.

Pagan's economy was primarily based on the Kyaukse agricultural basin northeast of the capital, and Minbu, south of Bagan, where the Bamars had built a large number of new weirs and diversionary canals. It also benefited from external trade through its coastal ports. The wealth of the kingdom was devoted to building over 10,000 Buddhist temples in the Pagan capital zone between the 11th and 13th centuries (of which 3000 remain to the present day). The wealthy donated tax-free land to religious authorities.

The Burmese language and culture gradually became dominant in the upper Irrawaddy valley, eclipsing the Pyu and Pali norms by the late 12th century. By then, the Bamar leadership of the kingdom was unquestioned. The Pyu had largely assumed the Bamar ethnicity in Upper Burma. The Burmese language, once an alien tongue, was now the lingua franca of the kingdom.

The kingdom went into decline in the 13th century due to the continuous growth of tax-free religious wealth. By the 1280s, two-thirds of Upper Burma's cultivable land had been alienated to the religion, which affected the crown's ability to retain the loyalty of courtiers and military servicemen. This ushered in a vicious circle of internal disorders and external challenges by Mons, Mongols, and Shans.

Beginning in the early 13th century, the Shan began to encircle the Pagan Empire from the north and the east. The Mongols, who had conquered Yunnan, the former homeland of the Bamar, in 1253, began their invasion in 1277 in response to an embassy crisis, and in 1287 sacked Pagan, ending the Pagan Kingdom's 250-year rule of the Irrawaddy valley and its periphery when the Pagan king of that time abandoned his palace on the news of the Mongol march. Pagan's rule of central Burma came to an end ten years later in 1297 when it was toppled by the Myinsaing Kingdom of Shan rulers.

== Small kingdoms ==
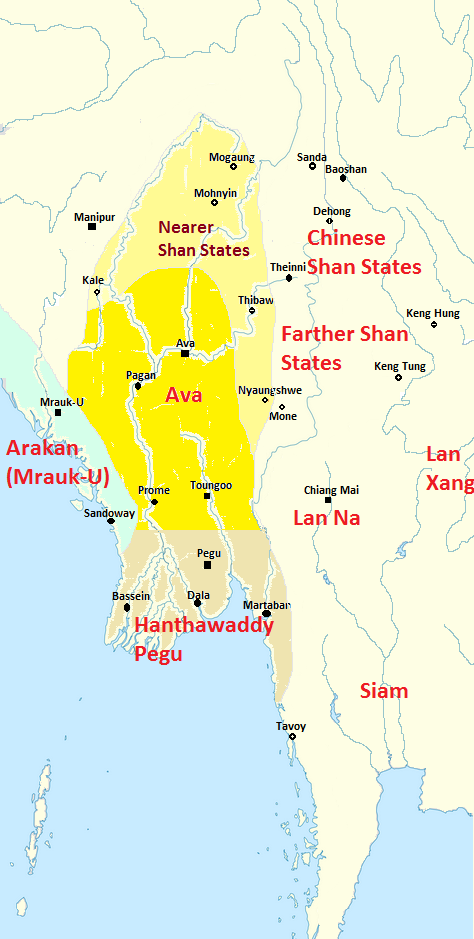
Political map of Burma (Myanmar) c. 1450 CE.

After the fall of Pagan, the Mongols left the searing Irrawaddy valley, but the Pagan Kingdom was irreparably broken up into several small kingdoms. By the mid-14th century, the country had become organised along four major power centres: Upper Burma, Lower Burma, Shan States, and Arakan. Many of the power centres were themselves made up of (often loosely held) minor kingdoms or princely states. This era was marked by a series of wars and switching alliances. Smaller kingdoms played a precarious game of paying allegiance to more powerful states, sometimes simultaneously.

=== Ava (1364–1555) ===
Founded in 1364, the Kingdom of Ava (Inwa) was the successor state to earlier, even smaller kingdoms based in central Burma: Toungoo (1287–1318), Myinsaing–Pinya Kingdom (1297–1364), and Sagaing Kingdom (1315–64). In its first years of existence, Ava, which viewed itself as the rightful successor to the Pagan Kingdom, tried to reassemble the former empire. While it was able to pull the Toungoo-ruled kingdom and peripheral Shan states (Kalay, Mohnyin, Mogaung, Hsipaw) into its fold at the peak of its power, it failed to reconquer the rest.

The Forty Years' War (1385–1424) with Hanthawaddy left Ava exhausted, and its power plateaued. Its kings regularly faced rebellions in their vassal regions but were able to put them down until the 1480s. In the late 15th century, the Prome Kingdom and some Shan states successfully broke away, and in the early 16th century, Ava itself came under attacks from its former vassals. In 1510, Toungoo also broke away. In 1527, the Confederation of Shan States led by Mohnyin captured Ava. The Confederation's rule of Upper Burma, though it lasted until 1555, was marred by internal fighting between Mohnyin and Thibaw houses. The kingdom was toppled by Toungoo forces in 1555.

The Burmese language and culture came into its own between the last period of the Pagan Kingdom (Old Burmese starts in the XII° century) and the Ava period.

=== Hanthawaddy Pegu (1287–1539, 1550–52) ===
The Mon-speaking Hanthawaddy kingdom was founded as Ramannadesa right after Pagan's collapse in 1297. In the beginning, the Lower-Burma-based kingdom was a loose federation of regional power centres in the Mottama, the Pegu, and the Irrawaddy Delta. The energetic reign of Razadarit (1384–1421) cemented the kingdom's existence. Razadarit firmly unified the three Mon-speaking regions together, and successfully held off Ava in the Forty Years' War (1385–1424).

After the war, Hanthawaddy entered its golden age, whereas its rival Ava gradually went into decline. From the 1420s to the 1530s, Hanthawaddy was the most powerful and prosperous kingdom of all post-Pagan kingdoms. Under a string of especially gifted monarchs, the kingdom enjoyed a long golden age, profiting from foreign commerce. The kingdom, with a flourishing the Mon language and culture, became a Centre of commerce and Theravada Buddhism.

Due to the inexperience of its last ruler, the powerful kingdom was conquered by the upstart Toungoo dynasty in 1539. The kingdom was briefly revived between 1550 and 1552. It effectively controlled only Pegu and was crushed by Toungoo in 1552.

=== Shan States (1287–1563) ===
The Shans, ethnic Tai peoples who came down with the Mongols, stayed and quickly came to dominate much of the northern to eastern arc of Burma, from northwestern Sagaing Division to Kachin Hills to the present day Shan Hills.

The most powerful Shan states were Mohnyin and Mogaung in present-day Kachin State, followed by Hsenwi (Theinni) (split up in a northern and a southern state in 1988), Hsipaw (Thibaw) and Momeik in present-day northern Shan State.

Minor states included Kalay, Bhamo (Wanmaw or Manmaw), Hkamti Long (Kantigyi), Hopong (Hopon), Hsahtung (Thaton), Hsamönghkam (Thamaingkan), Hsawnghsup (Thaungdut), Hsihkip (Thigyit), Hsumhsai (Hsum Hsai), Kehsi Mangam (Kyithi Bansan), Kengcheng (Kyaingchaing), Kenghkam (Kyaingkan), Kenglön (Kyainglon), Kengtawng, Kengtung (Kyaington), Kokang (Kho Kan), Kyawkku Hsiwan (Kyaukku), Kyong (Kyon), Laihka (Legya), Lawksawk (Yatsauk), Loi-ai (Lwe-e), Loilong (Lwelong), Loimaw (Lwemaw), Nyaung Shwe, and many more.

Mohnyin, in particular, constantly raided Ava's territory in the early 16th century. The Monhyin-led Confederation of Shan States, in alliance with Prome Kingdom, captured Ava itself in 1527. The Confederation defeated its erstwhile ally Prome in 1532 and ruled all of Upper Burma except Toungoo. But the Confederation was marred by internal bickering, and could not stop Toungoo, which conquered Ava in 1555 and all of the Shan States by 1563.

=== Arakan (1287–1785) ===
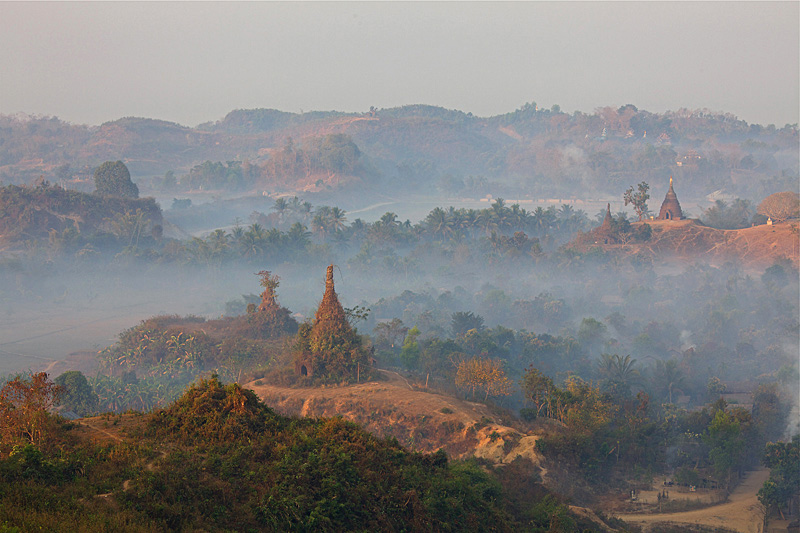
Temples at Mrauk U, the capital of the Mrauk U Kingdom, which ruled over what is now Rakhine State

Although Arakan had been de facto independent since the late Pagan period, the Launggyet dynasty of Arakan was ineffectual. Until the founding of the Mrauk-U Kingdom in 1429, Arakan was often caught between bigger neighbours, and found itself a battlefield during the Forty Years' War between Ava and Pegu. Mrauk-U went on to be a powerful kingdom in its own right between the 15th and 17th centuries, including East Bengal between 1459 and 1666. Arakan was the only post-Pagan kingdom not to be annexed by the Toungoo dynasty.

== Toungoo dynasty (1510–1752) ==
=== First Toungoo Empire (1510–99) ===
First Toungoo Empire

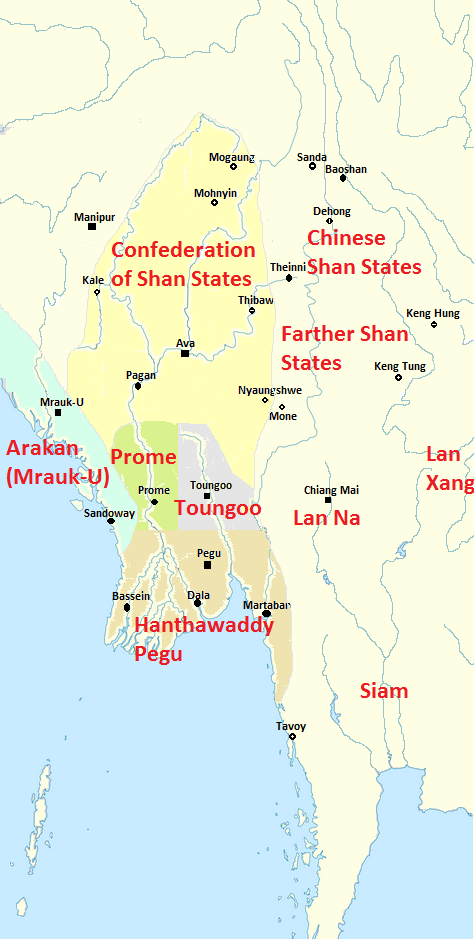
Political map of Burma (Myanmar) in 1530 CE at Tabinshwehti's accession

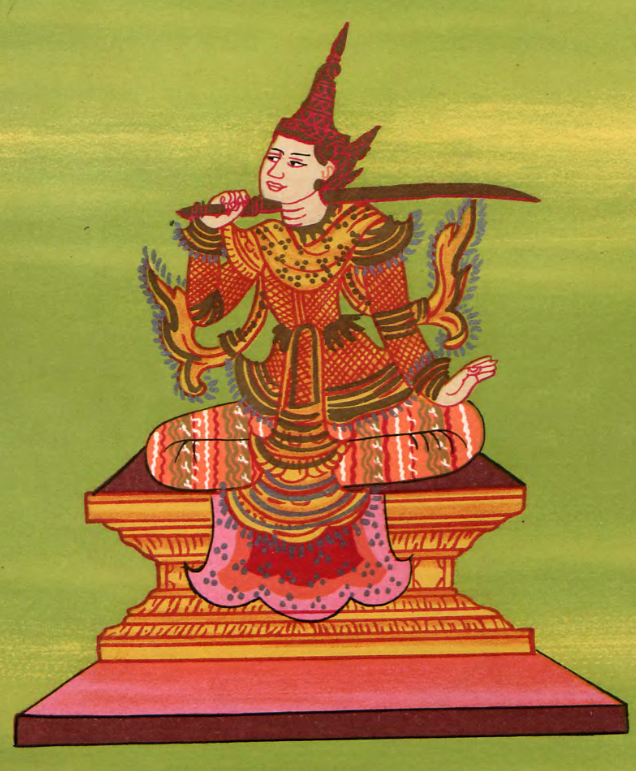
Tabinshwehti was the founder of Toungoo Empire.

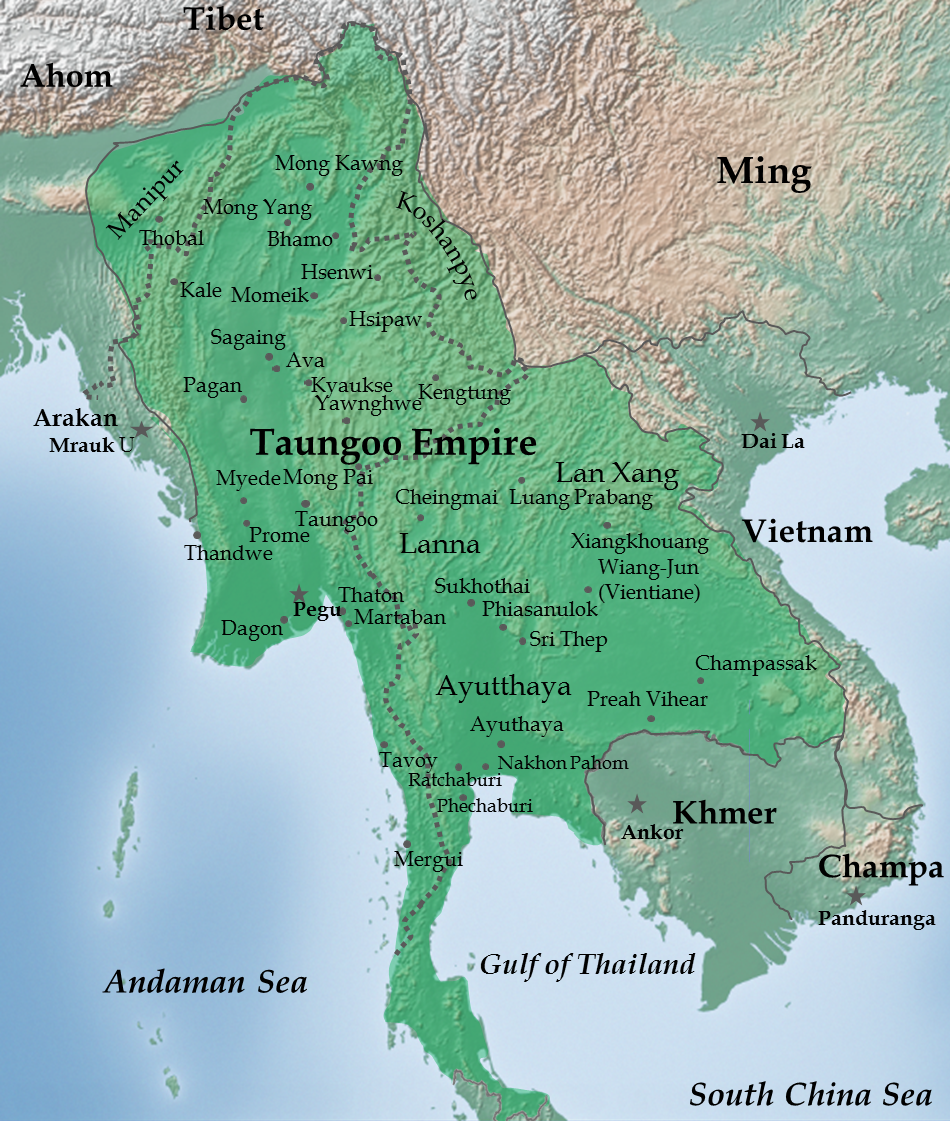
Toungoo Empire under Bayinnaung in 1580 CE

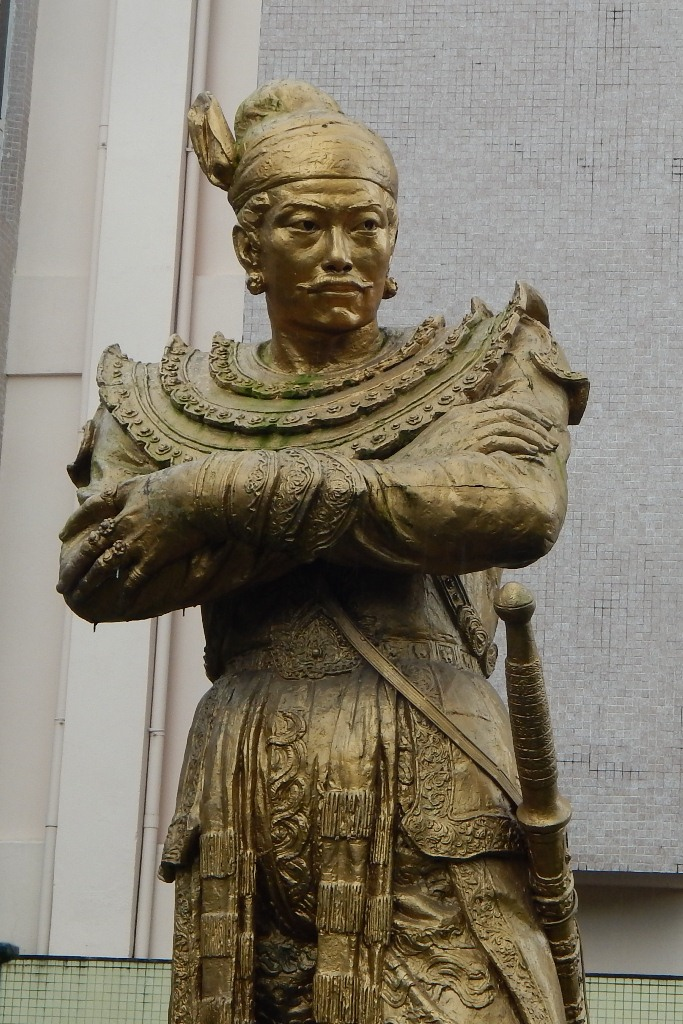
Statue of King Bayinnaung in front of the National Museum

Beginning in the 1480s, Ava faced constant internal rebellions and external attacks from the Shan States, and began to disintegrate. In 1510, Toungoo, located in the remote southeastern corner of the Ava kingdom, also declared independence. When the Confederation of Shan States conquered Ava in 1527, many refugees fled southeast to Toungoo, the only kingdom in peace, and one surrounded by larger hostile kingdoms.

Toungoo, led by its ambitious king Tabinshwehti and his deputy general Bayinnaung, would go on to reunify the petty kingdoms that had existed since the fall of the Pagan Empire, and found the largest empire in the history of Southeast Asia. First, the upstart kingdom defeated a more powerful Hanthawaddy in the Toungoo–Hanthawaddy War (1534–41). Tabinshwehti moved the capital to newly captured Pegu in 1539.

Toungoo had expanded its authority up to Pagan by 1544 but failed to conquer Arakan in 1545–47 and Siam in 1547–49. Tabinshwehti's successor Bayinnaung continued the policy of expansion, conquering Ava in 1555, Nearer/Cis-Salween Shan States (1557), Lan Na (1558), Manipur (1560), Farther/Trans-Salween Shan states (1562–63), the Siam (1564, 1569), and Lan Xang (1565–74), and bringing much of western and central mainland Southeast Asia under his rule. Bayinnaung put in place a lasting administrative system that reduced the power of hereditary Shan chiefs, and brought Shan customs in line with low-land norms. But he could not replicate an effective administrative system everywhere in his far flung empire. His empire was a loose collection of former sovereign kingdoms, whose kings were loyal to him as the Cakkavatti (စကြဝတေးမင်း, [sɛʔtɕà wədé mɪ́ɰ̃]; Universal Ruler), not the kingdom of Toungoo.

The overextended empire unravelled soon after Bayinnaung died in 1581. Siam broke away in 1584 and went to war with Burma until 1605. By 1597, the kingdom had lost all its possessions, including Toungoo, the ancestral home of the dynasty. In 1599, the Arakanese forces, aided by Portuguese mercenaries, and in alliance with the rebellious Toungoo forces, sacked Pegu. The country fell into chaos, with each region claiming a king. Portuguese mercenary Filipe de Brito e Nicote promptly rebelled against his Arakanese masters, and established Goa-backed Portuguese rule at Thanlyin in 1603.

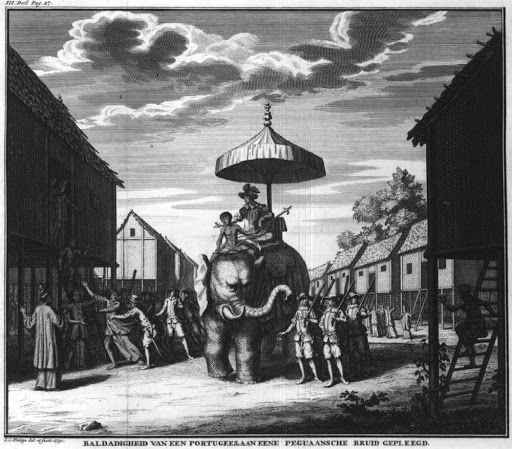
Portuguese ruler and soldiers mounting an elephant. Jan Caspar Philips (draughtsman and engraver).

Despite being a tumultuous time for Myanmar, the Toungoo expansions increased the international reach of the nation. Newly rich merchants from Myanmar traded as far as the Rajahnate of Cebu in the Philippines where they sold Burmese Sugar (śarkarā) for Cebuano gold. Filipinos also had merchant communities in Myanmar, historian William Henry Scott, quoting the Portuguese manuscript Summa Orientalis, noted that Mottama in Burma (Myanmar) had a large presence of merchants from Mindanao, Philippines. The Lucoes, a rival to the other Filipino group, the Mindanaoans, who instead came from the island of Luzon, were also hired as mercenaries and soldiers for both Siam (Thailand) and Burma (Myanmar), in the Burmese-Siamese Wars, the same case as the Portuguese, who were also mercenaries for both sides.

=== Restored Toungoo kingdom (Nyaungyan restoration) (1599–1752) ===
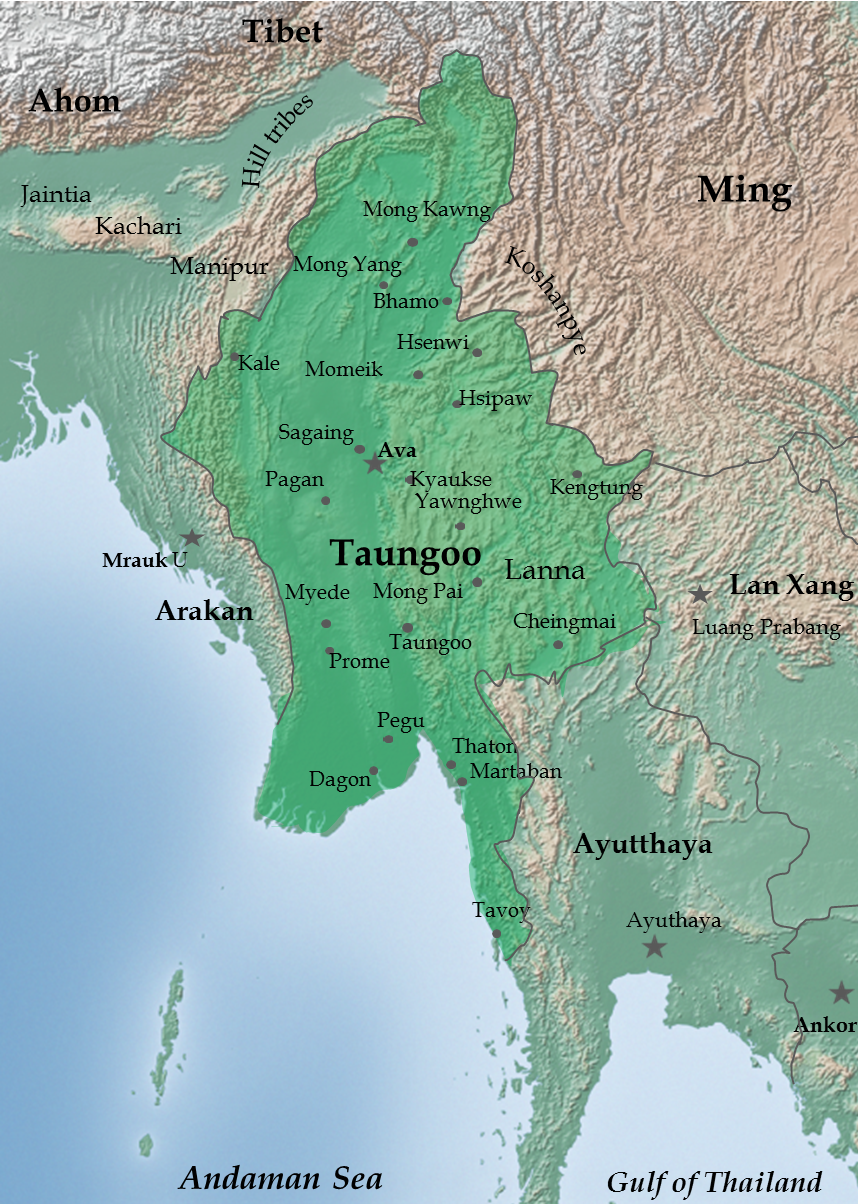
The restored Toungoo or Nyaungyan dynasty, c. 1650 CE

While the interregnum that followed the fall of the Pagan empire lasted over 250 years (1287–1555), that following the fall of First Toungoo was relatively short-lived. One of Bayinnaung's sons, Nyaungyan Min, immediately began the reunification effort, successfully restoring central authority over Upper Burma and nearer Shan states by 1606.

His successor Anaukpetlun defeated the Portuguese at Thanlyin in 1613. He recovered the upper Tanintharyi coast to Dawei and Lan Na from the Siamese by 1614. He also captured the trans-Salween Shan states (Kengtung and Sipsongpanna) in 1622–26.

His brother Thalun rebuilt the war-torn country. He ordered the first ever census in Burmese history in 1635, which showed that the kingdom had about two million people. By 1650, the three able kings–Nyaungyan, Anaukpetlun, and Thalun–had successfully rebuilt a smaller but far more manageable kingdom.

More importantly, the new dynasty proceeded to create a legal and political system whose basic features would continue under the Konbaung dynasty well into the 19th century. The crown completely replaced the hereditary chieftainships with appointed governorships in the entire Irrawaddy valley, and greatly reduced the hereditary rights of Shan chiefs. It also reined in the continuous growth of monastic wealth and autonomy, giving a greater tax base. Its trade and secular administrative reforms built a prosperous economy for more than 80 years. Except for a few occasional rebellions and an external war—Burma defeated Siam's attempt to take Lan Na and Mottama in 1662–64—the kingdom was largely at peace for the rest of the 17th century.

The kingdom entered a gradual decline, and the authority of the "palace kings" deteriorated rapidly in the 1720s. From 1724 onwards, the Meitei people began raiding the upper Chindwin River. In 1727, southern Lan Na (Chiang Mai) successfully revolted, leaving just northern Lan Na (Chiang Saen) under an increasingly nominal Burmese rule. Meitei raids intensified in the 1730s, reaching increasingly deeper parts of central Burma.

In 1740, the Mon in lower Burma began a rebellion, and founded the restored Hanthawaddy kingdom, and by 1745 controlled much of lower Burma. The Siamese also moved their authority up the Tanintharyi coast by 1752. Hanthawaddy invaded Upper Burma in November 1751 and captured Ava on 23 March 1752, ending the 266-year-old Toungoo dynasty.

== Konbaung dynasty (1752–1885) ==
=== Reunification ===
Konbaung dynasty

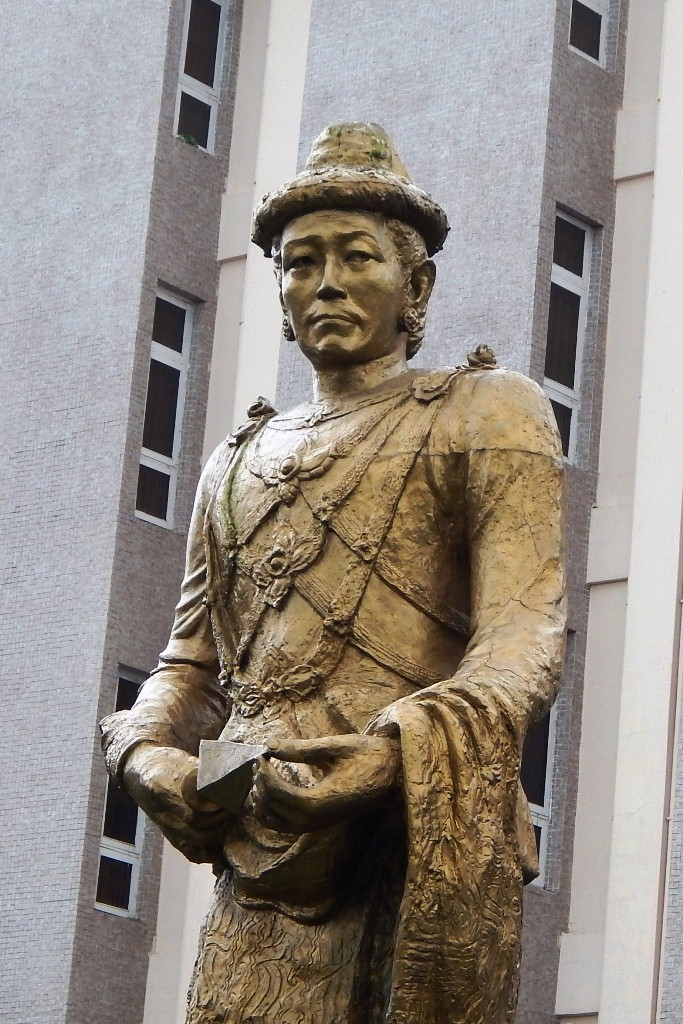
Alaungpaya was the founder of the Konbaung dynasty.

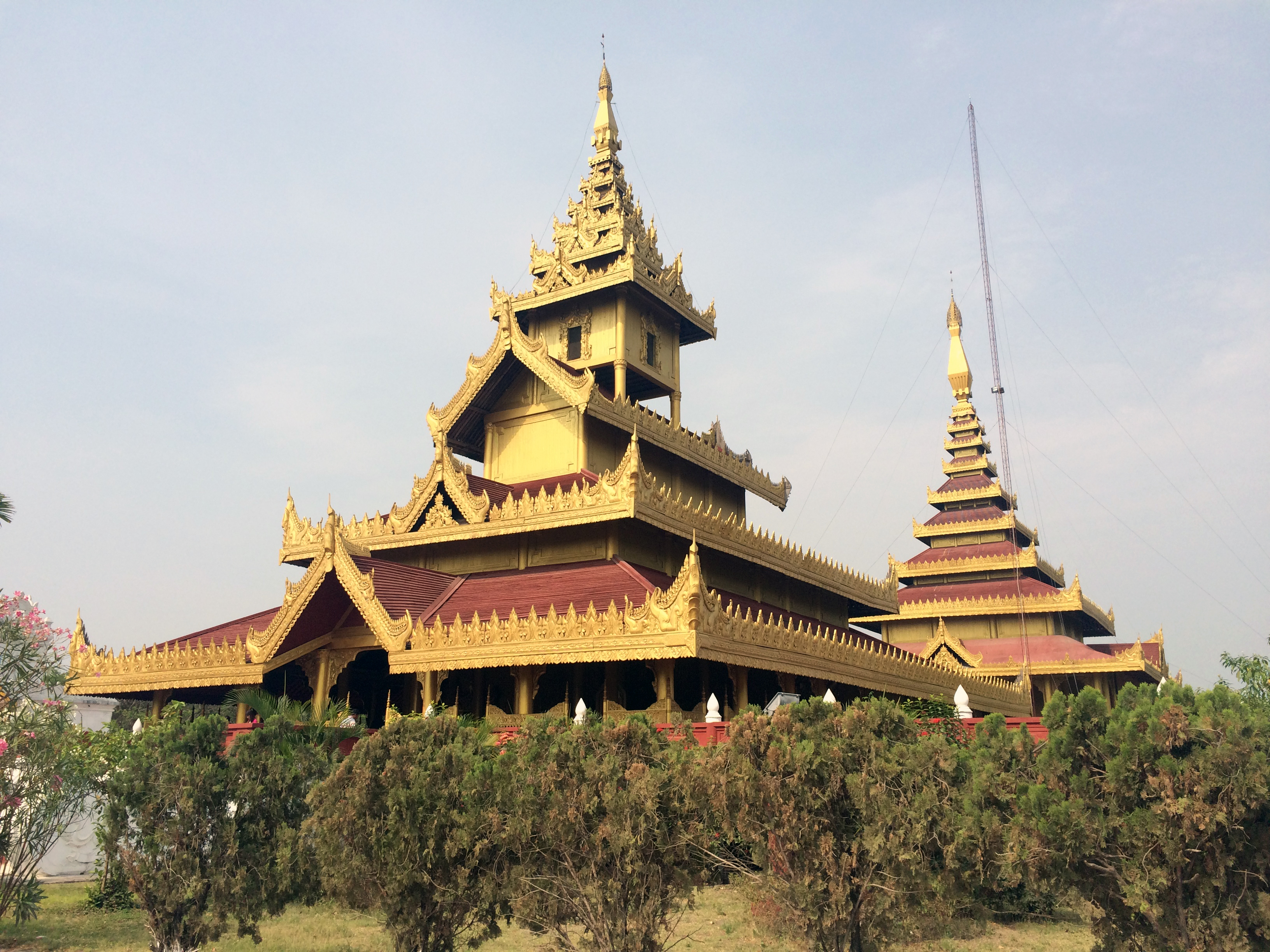
Shwebo Palace is a royal palace built in 1753 CE by King Alaungphaya.

Soon after the fall of Ava, a new dynasty rose in Shwebo to challenge the authority of Hanthawaddy. Over the next 70 years, the highly militaristic Konbaung dynasty went on to create the largest Burmese empire, second only to the empire of Bayinnaung. By 1759, King Alaungpaya's Konbaung forces had reunited all of Burma (and Manipur), extinguished the Mon-led Hanthawaddy dynasty once and for all, and driven out the European powers who provided arms to Hanthawaddy—the French from Thanlyin and the English from Cape Negrais.

=== Wars with Siam and China ===
The kingdom then went to war with the Ayutthaya Kingdom, which had occupied up the Tanintharyi coast to Mottama during the Burmese civil war (1740–1757), and had provided shelter to the Mon refugees. By 1767, the Konbaung armies had subdued much of Laos and defeated Siam. But they could not finish off the remaining Siamese resistance as they were forced to defend against four invasions by Qing China (1765–1769). While the Burmese defences held in "the most disastrous frontier war the Qing dynasty had ever waged", the Burmese were preoccupied with another impending invasion by the world's largest empire for years. The Qing kept a heavy military line-up in the border areas for about one decade in an attempt to wage another war while imposing a ban on inter-border trade for two decades.

The Ayutthaya Kingdom used the Konbaung preoccupation with the Qing to recover their lost territories by 1770, and in addition, went on to capture much of Lan Na by 1775, ending over two centuries of Burmese suzerainty over the region. They went to war again in 1775–1776, 1785–1786, 1787, 1792, 1803–1808, 1809–1812 and 1849–1855, but these all resulted in a stalemate. After decades of war, the two countries essentially exchanged Tanintharyi (to Burma) and Lan Na (to Siam).

=== Westward expansion and wars with British Empire ===
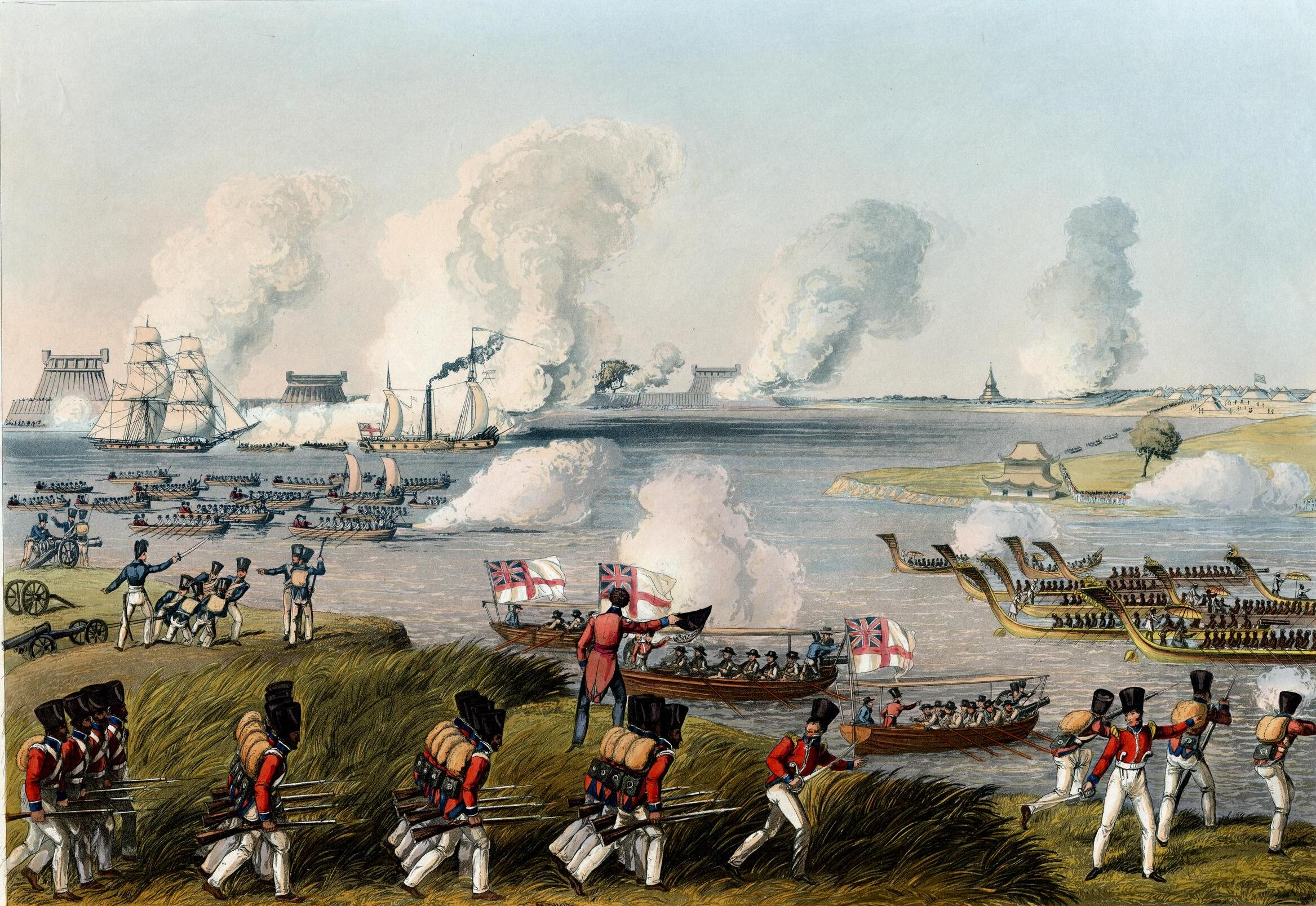
First Anglo-Burmese War in 1824

Faced with a powerful China in the northeast and a resurgent Siam in the southeast, King Bodawpaya turned westward for expansion. He conquered Arakan in 1785, annexed Manipur in 1814, and captured Assam in 1817–1819, leading to a long ill-defined border with British India. Bodawpaya's successor King Bagyidaw was left to put down British instigated rebellions in Manipur in 1819 and Assam in 1821–1822. Cross-border raids by rebels from the British protected territories and counter-cross-border raids by the Burmese led to the First Anglo-Burmese War (1824–26).

British soldiers dismantling cannons belonging to King Thibaw's forces, Third Anglo-Burmese War, Ava, 27 November 1885. Photographer: Hooper, Willoughby Wallace (1837–1912).

Lasting 2 years and costing 13 million pounds, the first Anglo-Burmese War was the longest and most expensive war in British Indian history, but ended in a decisive British victory. Burma ceded all of Bodawpaya's western acquisitions (Arakan, Manipur, and Assam) plus Tenasserim. Burma was crushed for years by repaying a large indemnity of one million pounds (then US$5 million). In 1852, the British unilaterally and easily seized the Pegu province in the Second Anglo-Burmese War.

After the war, King Mindon Min tried to modernise the Burmese state and economy, and made trade and territorial concessions to stave off further British encroachments, including ceding the Karenni States to the British in 1875. Nonetheless, the British, alarmed by the consolidation of French Indochina, annexed the remainder of the country in the Third Anglo-Burmese War in 1885, and sent the last Burmese king Thibaw Min and his family to exile in India.

=== Administrative and economic reforms ===
Konbaung kings extended administrative reforms first begun in the Restored Toungoo dynasty period (1599–1752), and achieved unprecedented levels of internal control and external expansion. Konbaung kings tightened control in the lowlands and reduced the hereditary privileges of Shan saophas (chiefs). Konbaung officials, particularly after 1780, began commercial reforms that increased government income and rendered it more predictable. The money economy continued to gain ground. In 1857, the crown inaugurated a full-fledged system of cash taxes and salaries, assisted by the country's first standardised silver coinage.

=== Culture ===
Cultural integration continued. For the first time in history, the Burmese language and culture came to predominate the entire Irrawaddy valley, with the Mon language and ethnicity completely eclipsed by 1830. The nearer Shan principalities adopted more lowland norms. The evolution and growth of Burmese literature and theatre continued, aided by an extremely high adult male literacy rate for the era (half of all males and 5% of females). Monastic and lay elites around the Konbaung kings, particularly from Bodawpaya's reign, also launched a major reformation of Burmese intellectual life and monastic organisation and practice known as the Sudhamma Reformation. It led to, among other things, Burma's first proper state histories.

== British rule ==
Recorder's Court on Sule Pagoda Road, with the Sule Pagoda at the far end, Rangoon, 1868. Photographer: J. Jackson.

Britain made Burma a province of India in 1886, with the capital at Rangoon. Traditional Burmese society was drastically altered by the demise of the monarchy and the separation of religion and state. Though war officially ended after only a couple of weeks, resistance continued in northern Burma until 1890, with the British finally resorting to a systematic destruction of villages and appointment of new officials to finally halt all guerrilla activity. The economic nature of society also changed dramatically. After the opening of the Suez Canal, the demand for Burmese rice grew, and vast tracts of land were opened up for cultivation. However, to prepare the new land for cultivation, farmers were forced to borrow money from Indian moneylenders called chettiars at high interest rates and were often foreclosed on and evicted, losing land and livestock. Most of the jobs also went to indentured Indian labourers, and whole villages became outlawed as they resorted to 'dacoity' (armed robbery). While the Burmese economy grew, most of the power and wealth remained in the hands of several British firms, Anglo-Burmese people, and migrants from India. The civil service was largely staffed by the Anglo-Burmese community and Indians, and Bamars were largely excluded almost entirely from military service.

By around the start of the 20th century, a nationalist movement began to take shape in the form of the Young Men's Buddhist Association (YMBA), modelled on the YMCA, as religious associations were allowed by the colonial authorities. They were later superseded by the General Council of Burmese Associations (GCBA), which was linked with Wunthanu athin or National Associations that sprang up in villages throughout Burma proper. Between 1900 – 1911, the "Irish Buddhist" U Dhammaloka challenged Christianity and British rule on religious grounds. A new generation of Burmese leaders arose in the early 20th century from amongst the educated classes that were permitted to go to London to study law. They came away from this experience with the belief that the Burmese situation could be improved through reform. Progressive constitutional reform in the early 1920s led to a legislature with limited powers, a university, and more autonomy for Burma within the administration of India. Efforts were also undertaken to increase the representation of Burmese in the civil service. Some people began to feel that the rate of change was not fast enough and the reforms were not expansive enough.

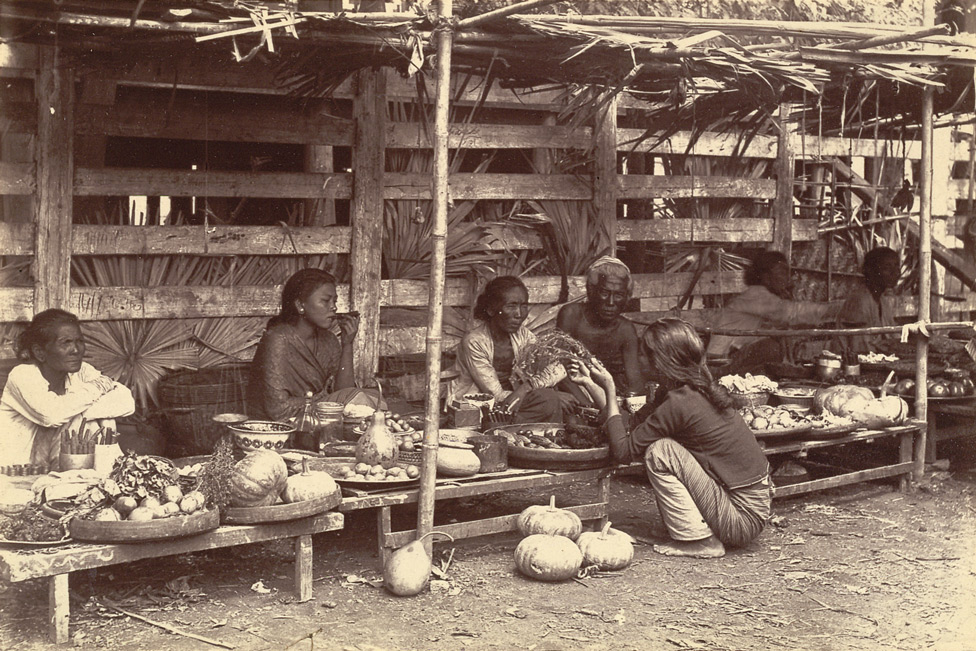
Vegetable stall on the roadside at the Madras Lancer Lines, Mandalay, January 1886. Photographer: Hooper, Willoughby Wallace (1837–1912).

In 1920, the first university students' strike in history broke out in protest against the new University Act which the students believed would only benefit the elite and perpetuate colonial rule. 'National Schools' sprang up across the country in protest against the colonial education system, and the strike came to be commemorated as 'National Day'. There were further strikes and anti-tax protests in the later 1920s led by the Wunthanu athins. Prominent among the political activists were Buddhist monks (pongyi), such as U Ottama and U Seinda in the Arakan who subsequently led an armed rebellion against the British and later the nationalist government after independence, and U Wisara, the first martyr of the movement to die after a protracted hunger strike in prison. (One of the main thoroughfares in Yangon is named after U Wisara.) In December 1930, a local tax protest by Saya San in Tharrawaddy quickly grew into first a regional and then a national insurrection against the government. Lasting for two years, the Galon Rebellion, named after the mythical garuda — the enemy of the nāgas (i.e., the British) – emblazoned on the pennants the rebels carried, required thousands of British troops to suppress, along with promises of further political reform. The eventual trial of Saya San, who was executed, allowed several future national leaders, including Ba Maw and U Saw, who participated in his defence, to rise to prominence.

The paddle steamer Ramapoora (right) of the British India Steam Navigation Company on the Rangoon river, having just arrived from Moulmein. 1895. Photographers: Watts and Skeen.

May 1930 saw the founding of the Dobama Asiayone ("We Bamars Association") whose members called themselves Thakin (an ironic name since thakin means "master" in Burmese, rather like sahib— proclaiming that they were the true masters of the country entitled to the term usurped by the colonial masters). The second university students strike in 1936 was triggered by the expulsion of Aung San and Ko Nu, leaders of the Rangoon University Students Union (RUSU), for refusing to reveal the name of the author who had written an article in their university magazine, making a scathing attack on one of the senior university officials. It spread to Mandalay, leading to the formation of the All Burma Students Union (ABSU). Aung San and Nu subsequently joined the Thakin movement progressing from student to national politics. The British separated Burma from India in 1937 and granted the colony a new constitution calling for a fully elected assembly, but this proved to be a divisive issue as some Burmese felt that this was a ploy to exclude them from any further Indian reforms whereas other Burmese saw any action that removed Burma from the control of India to be a positive step. Ba Maw served as the first prime minister of Burma, but he was succeeded by U Saw in 1939, who served as prime minister from 1940 until he was arrested on 19 January 1942 by the British for communicating with the Japanese.

A wave of strikes and protests that started from the oilfields of central Burma in 1938 became a general strike with far-reaching consequences. In Rangoon, student protesters, after successfully picketing the Secretariat, the seat of the colonial government, were charged by mounted police from the Indian Imperial Police, who were wielding batons, which killed a Rangoon University student called Aung Kyaw. In Mandalay, the colonial police shot into a crowd of protesters led by Buddhist monks, killing 17 people. The movement became known as Htaung thoun ya byei ayeidawbon (the '1300 Revolution' named after the Burmese calendar year), and 20 December, the day the first martyr Aung Kyaw fell, commemorated by students as 'Bo Aung Kyaw Day'.

== World War II ==
Some Burmese nationalists saw the outbreak of World War II as an opportunity to extort concessions from the British in exchange for support in the war effort. Other Burmese, such as the Thakin movement, opposed Burma's participation in the war under any circumstances. Aung San co-founded the Communist Party of Burma (CPB) with other Thakins in August 1939. Marxist literature as well as tracts from the Sinn Féin movement in Ireland had been widely circulated and read among political activists. Aung San also co-founded the People's Revolutionary Party (PRP), renamed the Socialist Party after World War II. He was also instrumental in founding the Freedom Bloc by allying the Dobama, ABSU, politically active monks and Ba Maw's Poor Man's Party. After the Dobama organisation called for a national uprising, an arrest warrant was issued for many of the organisation's leaders including Aung San, who escaped to China. Aung San intended to make contact with the Chinese Communist Party, but he was detected by the Japanese authorities, who offered him support by forming a secret intelligence unit called the Minami Kikan headed by Colonel Suzuki with the objective of closing the Burma Road and supporting a national uprising. Aung San briefly returned to Burma to enlist twenty-nine young men who went to Japan with him to receive military training on Hainan Island, China, and they came to be known as the "Thirty Comrades". When the Japanese occupied Bangkok in December 1941, Aung San announced the formation of the Burma Independence Army (BIA) in anticipation of the Japanese invasion of Burma in 1942.

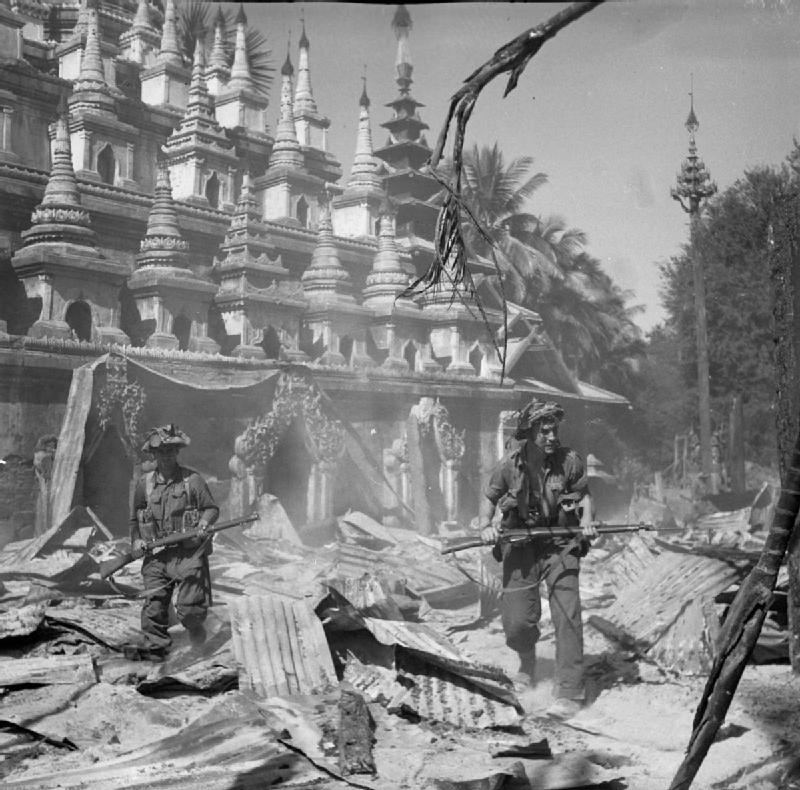
British soldiers on patrol in the ruins of the Burmese town of Bahe during the advance on Mandalay, January 1945

The BIA formed a provisional government in some areas of the country in the spring of 1942, but there were differences within the Japanese leadership over the future of Burma. While Colonel Suzuki encouraged the Thirty Comrades to form a provisional government, the Japanese Military leadership had never formally accepted such a plan. Eventually, the Japanese Army turned to Ba Maw to form a government. During the war in 1942, the BIA had grown in an uncontrolled manner, and in many districts, officials and even criminals appointed themselves to the BIA. It was reorganised as the Burma Defence Army (BDA) under the Japanese but still headed by Aung San. While the BIA had been an irregular force, the BDA was recruited by selection and trained as a conventional army by Japanese instructors. Ba Maw was afterwards declared head of state, and his cabinet included both Aung San as War Minister and the Communist leader Thakin Than Tun as Minister of Land and Agriculture, as well as the Socialist leaders Thakins Nu and Mya. When the Japanese declared Burma, in theory, independent in 1943, the Burma Defence Army (BDA) was renamed the Burma National Army (BNA).

=== Joining the Allies ===
It soon became apparent that Japanese promises of independence were merely a sham and that Ba Maw was deceived. As the war turned against the Japanese, they declared Burma a fully sovereign state on 1 August 1943, but this was just another facade. Disillusioned, Aung San began negotiations with Communist leaders Thakin Than Tun and Thakin Soe, and Socialist leaders Ba Swe and Kyaw Nyein which led to the formation of the Anti-Fascist Organisation (AFO) in August 1944 at a secret meeting of the CPB, the PRP and the BNA in Pegu. The AFO was later renamed the Anti-Fascist People's Freedom League (AFPFL). Thakin Than Tun and Thakin Soe, while in Insein prison in July 1941, had co-authored the Insein Manifesto which, against the prevailing opinion in the Dobama movement, identified world fascism as the main enemy in the coming war and called for temporary co-operation with the British in a broad allied coalition which should include the Soviet Union. Soe had already gone underground to organise resistance against the Japanese occupation, and Thakin Than Tun was able to pass on Japanese intelligence to Soe, while other Communist leaders Thakin Thein Pe and Tin Shwe made contact with the exiled colonial government in Simla, India.

There were informal contacts between the AFO and the Allies in 1944 and 1945 through the British organisation Force 136. On 27 March 1945, the Burma National Army rose in a countrywide rebellion against the Japanese. 27 March had been celebrated as 'Resistance Day' until the military renamed it 'Tatmadaw (Armed Forces) Day'. Aung San and others subsequently began negotiations with Lord Mountbatten and officially joined the Allies as the Patriotic Burmese Forces (PBF). At the first meeting, the AFO represented itself to the British as the provisional government of Burma with Thakin Soe as chairman and Aung San as a member of its ruling committee. The Japanese were routed from most of Burma by May 1945. Negotiations then began with the British over the disarmament of the AFO and the participation of its troops in a post-war Burma Army. Some veterans had been formed into a paramilitary force under Aung San, called the Pyithu yèbaw tat or People's Volunteer Organisation (PVO), and were openly drilling in uniform. The absorption of the PBF was concluded successfully at the Kandy conference in Ceylon in September 1945.

Under Japanese occupation, 170,000 to 250,000 civilians died. Inter-ethnic tensions were further inflamed during the occupation as many minority ethnic groups such as the Karen and the Kachin remained loyal to the British. This caused further bloodshed as communal violence erupted in several places.

== Post World War II ==
The surrender of the Japanese brought a military administration to Burma and demands to try Aung San for his involvement in a murder during military operations in 1942. Lord Mountbatten realised that this was an impossibility, considering Aung San's popular appeal.

After the war ended, the British Governor, Sir Reginald Dorman-Smith, returned. The restored government established a political program that focused on the physical reconstruction of the country and delayed discussion of independence.

The AFPFL opposed the government, leading to political instability in the country. A rift had also developed in the AFPFL between the Communists and Aung San together with the Socialists over strategy, which led to Than Tun being forced to resign as general secretary in July 1946 and the expulsion of the CPB from the AFPFL the following October.

Dorman-Smith was replaced by Sir Hubert Rance as the new governor, and almost immediately after his appointment, the Rangoon Police went on strike. The strike, starting in September 1946, then spread from the police to government employees and came close to becoming a general strike.

Rance calmed the situation by meeting with Aung San and convincing him to join the Governor's Executive Council along with other members of the AFPFL. The new executive council, which now had increased credibility in the country, began negotiations for Burmese independence, which were concluded successfully in London as the Aung San-Attlee Agreement on 27 January 1947. The agreement left parts of the communist and conservative branches of the AFPFL dissatisfied, however, sending the Red Flag Communists led by Thakin Soe underground and the conservatives into opposition.

Aung San also succeeded in concluding an agreement with ethnic minorities for a unified Burma at the Panglong Conference on 12 February, celebrated since as 'Union Day'. U Aung Zan Wai, U Pe Khin, Myoma U Than Kywe, Major Aung, Sir Maung Gyi, and Dr. Sein Mya Maung. The most important negotiators and leaders of the historical pinlon (panglong) Conference negotiated with the Burmese national top leader, General Aung San, and other top leaders in 1947. All these leaders decided to join to form the Union of Burma. Union Day celebration is one of the greatest in the history of Burma. The popularity of the AFPFL, now dominated by Aung San and the Socialists, was eventually confirmed when it won an overwhelming victory in the April 1947 constituent assembly elections. On 19 July 1947 U Saw, a conservative pre-war Prime Minister of Burma, engineered the assassination of Aung San and several members of his cabinet including his eldest brother Ba Win, while meeting in the Secretariat. 19 July has been commemorated since as Martyrs' Day. Shortly after, rebellion broke out in the Arakan led by the veteran monk U Seinda, and it began to spread to other districts.

Thakin Nu, the Socialist leader, was now asked to form a new cabinet, and he presided over Burmese independence, which was established under the Burma Independence Act 1947 on 4 January 1948. The popular sentiment to part with the British was so strong at the time that Burma opted not to join the Commonwealth of Nations, unlike India or Pakistan.

== Independent Myanmar ==
=== 1948–1962 ===
Civil war broke out almost immediately following independence, as the Communist Party of Burma withdrew from the government and began its insurrection, while the Karen insurgency began the following year. The first years of Burmese independence were marked by successive insurgencies by the Red Flag Communists led by Thakin Soe, the White Flag Communists led by Thakin Than Tun, the Yebaw Hpyu or (White Band) People's Volunteer Organisation led by Bo La Yaung, a member of the Thirty Comrades, army rebels calling themselves the Revolutionary Burma Army (RBA) led by Communist officers Bo Zeya, Bo Yan Aung and Bo Yè Htut – all three of them members of the Thirty Comrades, Arakanese Muslims or the Mujahid, and the Karen National Union (KNU).

After the Communist victory in China in 1949, remote areas of Northern Burma were for many years controlled by an army of Kuomintang (KMT) forces under the command of General Li Mi.

Burma accepted foreign assistance in rebuilding the country in these early years, but continued American support for the Chinese Nationalist military presence in Burma finally resulted in the country rejecting most foreign aid, refusing to join the South-East Asia Treaty Organization (SEATO), and supporting the Bandung Conference of 1955. Burma generally strove to be neutral in world affairs, and was one of the first countries in the world to recognise Israel and the People's Republic of China.

By 1958, the country was beginning to recover economically, but was beginning to fall apart politically due to a split in the AFPFL into two factions. One faction was led by Thakins Nu and Tin, and the other was led by Ba Swe and Kyaw Nyein. And this was despite the unexpected success of U Nu's "Arms for Democracy" offer taken up by U Seinda in the Arakan, the Pa-O, some Mon and Shan groups, but more significantly by the PVO surrendering their arms.

The situation however became very unstable in parliament, with U Nu surviving a no-confidence vote only with the support of the opposition National United Front (NUF), believed to have 'crypto-communists' amongst them. Army hardliners now saw the 'threat' of the CPB coming to an agreement with U Nu through the NUF, and in the end U Nu 'invited' Army Chief of Staff General Ne Win to take over the country. Over 400 'communist sympathisers' were arrested, of which 153 were deported to the Coco Island in the Andaman Sea. Among them was the NUF leader Aung Than, older brother of Aung San. The Botataung, Kyemon and Rangoon Daily newspapers were also closed down.

Ne Win's caretaker government successfully improved the security situation and paved the way for new general elections in 1960 that returned U Nu's Union Party with a large majority. The situation did not remain stable for long, when the Shan Federal Movement, started by Nyaung Shwe Sawbwa Sao Shwe Thaik (the first President of independent Burma 1948–52) and aspiring to a 'loose' federation, was seen as a separatist movement insisting on the government honouring the right to secession in 10 years provided for by the 1947 Constitution. Ne Win had already succeeded in stripping the Shan Sawbwas of their feudal powers in exchange for comfortable pensions for life in 1959.

=== 1962–1988 ===
On 2 March 1962, Ne Win, with sixteen other senior military officers, staged a coup d'état, arrested U Nu, Sao Shwe Thaik, and several others, and declared a socialist state to be run by their Union Revolutionary Council. Sao Shwe Thaik's son, Sao Mye Thaik, was shot dead in what was generally described as a "bloodless" coup. Thibaw Sawbwa Sao Kya Seng also disappeared mysteriously after being stopped at a checkpoint near Taunggyi.

A number of protests followed the coup, and initially, the military's response was mild. However, on 7 July 1962, a peaceful student protest on Rangoon University campus was suppressed by the military, killing over 100 students. The next day, the army blew up the Students Union building. Peace talks were convened between the RC and various armed insurgent groups in 1963, but without any breakthrough, and during the talks as well as in the aftermath of their failure, hundreds were arrested in Rangoon and elsewhere from both the right and the left of the political spectrum. All opposition parties were banned on 28 March 1964. The Kachin insurgency by the Kachin Independence Organisation (KIO) had begun earlier in 1961 triggered by U Nu's declaration of Buddhism as the state religion, and the Shan State Army (SSA), led by Sao Shwe Thaik's wife Mahadevi and son Chao Tzang Yaunghwe, launched a rebellion in 1964 as a direct consequence of the 1962 military coup.

Ne Win quickly took steps to transform Burma into his vision of a "socialist state" and to isolate the country from contact with the rest of the world. A one-party system was established with his newly formed Burma Socialist Programme Party (BSPP) in complete control. Commerce and industry were nationalised across the board, but the economy did not grow at first, if at all, as the government put too much emphasis on industrial development at the expense of agriculture. In April 1972, General Ne Win and the rest of the Union Revolutionary Council retired from the military, but now as U Ne Win, he continued to run the country through the BSPP. A new constitution was promulgated in January 1974 that resulted in the creation of a People's Assembly (Pyithu Hluttaw) that held supreme legislative, executive, and judicial authority, and local People's Councils. Ne Win became the president of the new government.

Despite the Union Revolutionary Council leaders' phraseology being socialist, their actions were those of ardent nationalists seeking to maximize the power of their state. According to a 1981 scholarly analysis, "there is little evidence that Burma either is now, or is in the process of becoming a socialist society". The study also stated that "the leadership, although demonstrating a certain social concern, clearly lacks the ability and the will necessary to build a socialist society".Significant gains were made, though not without blemish, in some of the social sectors. Adult literacy rate grew from 60% to 80% between the late 1960s and 1980s, and the number enrolled in primary schools as a percentage of the age group increased from 44% to 54% during the same period. In the health sector, life expectancy rose from 44% to 54%, infant mortality rate declined from 129 to 50, and the number of persons per physician, from 15,560 to 3,900 during the same period.

Beginning in May 1974, a wave of strikes hit Rangoon and elsewhere in the country against a backdrop of corruption, inflation, and food shortages, especially rice. In Rangoon workers were arrested at the Insein railway yard, and troops opened fire on workers at the Thamaing textile mill and Simmalaik dockyard. In December 1974, the biggest anti-government demonstrations to date broke out over the funeral of former UN Secretary-General U Thant. U Thant had been former prime minister U Nu's closest advisor in the 1950s and was seen as a symbol of opposition to the military regime. The Burmese people felt that U Thant was denied a state funeral that he deserved as a statesman of international stature because of his association with U Nu.

On 23 March 1976, over 100 students were arrested for holding a peaceful ceremony (Hmaing yabyei) to mark the centenary of the birth of Thakin Kodaw Hmaing, who was the greatest Burmese poet, writer, and nationalist leader of the 20th century history of Burma. He had inspired a whole generation of Burmese nationalists and writers by his work, mainly written in verse, fostering immense pride in their history, language, and culture, and urging them to take direct action such as strikes by students and workers. It was Hmaing, as leader of the mainstream Dobama (Us Burma) Organization, who sent the Thirty Comrades abroad for military training, which became the origin of the modern Myanmar Army, and after independence, devoted his life to internal peace and national reconciliation until he died at the age of 88 in 1964. Hmaing lies buried in a mausoleum at the foot of the Shwedagon Pagoda.

A young staff officer called Captain Ohn Kyaw Myint conspired with a few fellow officers in 1976 to assassinate Ne Win and San Yu, but the plot was uncovered, and the officer was tried and hanged.

In 1978, a military operation was conducted against the Rohingya Muslims in Arakan, called the King Dragon operation, causing 250,000 refugees to flee to neighbouring Bangladesh.

U Nu, after his release from prison in October 1966, had left Burma in April 1969, and formed the Parliamentary Democracy Party (PDP) the following August in Bangkok, Thailand with the former Thirty Comrades, Bo Let Ya, co-founder of the CPB and former Minister of Defence and deputy prime minister, Bo Yan Naing, and U Thwin, ex-BIA and former Minister of Trade. Another member of the Thirty Comrades, Bohmu Aung, former Minister of Defence, joined later. The fourth, Bo Setkya, who had gone underground after the 1962 coup, died in Bangkok shortly before U Nu arrived. The PDP launched an armed rebellion across the Thai border from 1972 till 1978 when Bo Let Ya was killed in an attack by the Karen National Union (KNU). U Nu, Bohmu Aung, and Bo Yan Naing returned to Rangoon after the 1980 amnesty. Ne Win also secretly held peace talks later in 1980 with the KIO and the CPB, again ending in a deadlock as before.

=== Crisis and the 1988 Uprising ===
Ne Win retired as president in 1981, but remained in power as Chairman of the BSPP until his sudden, unexpected announcement to step down on 23 July 1988. In the 1980s, the economy began to grow as the government relaxed restrictions on foreign aid, but by the late 1980s, falling commodity prices and rising debt led to an economic crisis. This led to economic reforms in 1987–1988 that relaxed socialist controls and encouraged foreign investment. This was not enough, however, to stop growing turmoil in the country, compounded by periodic "demonetisation" of certain banknotes in the currency, the last of which was decreed in September 1987, wiping out the savings of the vast majority of people.

In September 1987, Burma's de facto ruler, U Ne Win, suddenly cancelled certain currency notes, which caused a great downturn in the economy. The main reason for the cancellation of these notes was superstition on U Ne Win's part, as he considered the number nine his lucky number—he only allowed 45 and 90 kyat notes, because these were divisible by nine. Burma's admittance to Least Developed Country status by the UN the following December highlighted its economic bankruptcy.

Triggered by brutal police repression of student-led protests, causing the death of over a hundred students and civilians in March and June 1988, widespread protests and demonstrations broke out on 8 August throughout the country. The military responded by firing into the crowds, alleging Communist infiltration. Violence, chaos, and anarchy reigned. Civil administration had ceased to exist, and by September of that year, the country was on the verge of a revolution. The armed forces, under the nominal command of General Saw Maung, staged a coup on 8 August to restore order. During the 8888 Uprising, as it became known, the military killed over 3,000 people. The military swept aside the Constitution of 1974 in favour of martial law under the State Law and Order Restoration Council (SLORC) with Saw Maung as chairman and prime minister.

At a special six-hour press conference on 5 August 1989, Brig. Gen. Khin Nyunt, the SLORC Secretary 1, and chief of Military Intelligence Service (MIS), claimed that the uprising had been orchestrated by the Communist Party of Burma through its underground organisation. Although there had inevitably been some underground CPB presence as well as that of ethnic insurgent groups, there was no evidence of their being in charge to any extent. In fact, in March 1989, the CPB leadership was overthrown by a rebellion by the Kokang and Wa troops that it had come to depend on after losing its former strongholds in central Burma and re-establishing bases in the northeast in the late 1960s; the Communist leaders were soon forced into exile across the Chinese border.

=== 1990–2006 ===
The military government announced a change of name for the country in English from Burma to Myanmar in 1989. It also continued the economic reforms started by the old regime and called for a Constituent Assembly to revise the 1974 Constitution. This led to multiparty elections in May 1990 in which the newly formed National League for Democracy (NLD) won a landslide victory over the National Unity Party (NUP, the successor to the BSPP) and about a dozen smaller parties.

The military ignored the results and continued to rule. The two leaders of the NLD, Tin Oo and Aung San Suu Kyi, daughter of Aung San, were kept under the house arrest imposed on them the previous year. Burma came under increasing international pressure to convene the elected assembly, particularly after Aung San Suu Kyi was awarded the Nobel Peace Prize in 1991, and also faced economic sanctions. In April 1992, the military replaced Saw Maung with General Than Shwe.

Than Shwe released U Nu from prison and relaxed some of the restrictions on Aung San Suu Kyi's house arrest, finally releasing her in 1995, although she was forbidden to leave Rangoon. Than Shwe also finally allowed a National Convention to meet in January 1993, but insisted that the assembly preserve a major role for the military in any future government, and suspended the convention from time to time. The NLD, fed up with the interference, walked out in late 1995, and the assembly was finally dismissed in March 1996 without producing a constitution.

During the 1990s, the military regime had also had to deal with several insurgencies by tribal minorities along its borders. General Khin Nyunt was able to negotiate cease-fire agreements that ended the fighting with the Kokang, hill tribes such as the Wa, and the Kachin, but the Karen would not negotiate. The military finally captured the main Karen base at Manerplaw in spring 1995, but there has still been no final peace settlement. Khun Sa, a major opium warlord who nominally controlled parts of Shan State, made a deal with the government in December 1995 after US pressure.

After the failure of the National Convention to create a new constitution, tensions between the government and the NLD mounted, resulting in two major crackdowns on the NLD in 1996 and 1997. The SLORC was abolished in November 1997 and replaced by the State Peace and Development Council (SPDC), but it was merely a cosmetic change. Continuing reports of human rights violations in Burma led the United States to intensify sanctions in 1997, and the European Union followed suit in 2000.

The military placed Aung San Suu Kyi under house arrest again in September 2000 until May 2002, when her travel restrictions outside of Rangoon were also lifted. Reconciliation talks were held with the government, but these came to a stalemate, and Suu Kyi was once again taken into custody in May 2003 after an ambush on her motorcade, reportedly by a pro-military mob. The government also carried out another large-scale crackdown on the NLD, arresting many of its leaders and closing down most of its offices. The situation in Burma remains tense to this day.

In August 2003, Kyin Nyunt announced a seven-step "roadmap to democracy". There was no timetable or any independent mechanism for verifying that it was moving forward. Most Western governments and Burma's neighbours have been sceptical of the roadmap.

On 17 February 2005, the government reconvened the National Convention, for the first time since 1993, in an attempt to rewrite the Constitution. However, major pro-democracy organisations and parties, including the National League for Democracy, were barred from participating, the military allowing only selected smaller parties. It was adjourned once again in January 2006.

In November 2005, the military junta started moving the government away from Yangon to an unnamed location near Kyatpyay just outside Pyinmana, to a newly designated capital city. This public action follows a long-term unofficial policy of moving critical military and government infrastructure away from Yangon to avoid a repetition of the events of 1988. On Armed Forces Day (27 March 2006), the capital was officially named Naypyidaw Myodaw (lit. Royal City of the Seat of Kings).

In November 2006, the International Labour Organization (ILO) announced it will be seeking – at the International Court of Justice – "to prosecute members of the ruling Myanmar junta for crimes against humanity" over the continuous forced labour of its citizens by the military. According to the ILO, an estimated 800,000 people are subject to forced labour in Myanmar.

=== 2007 anti-government protests ===
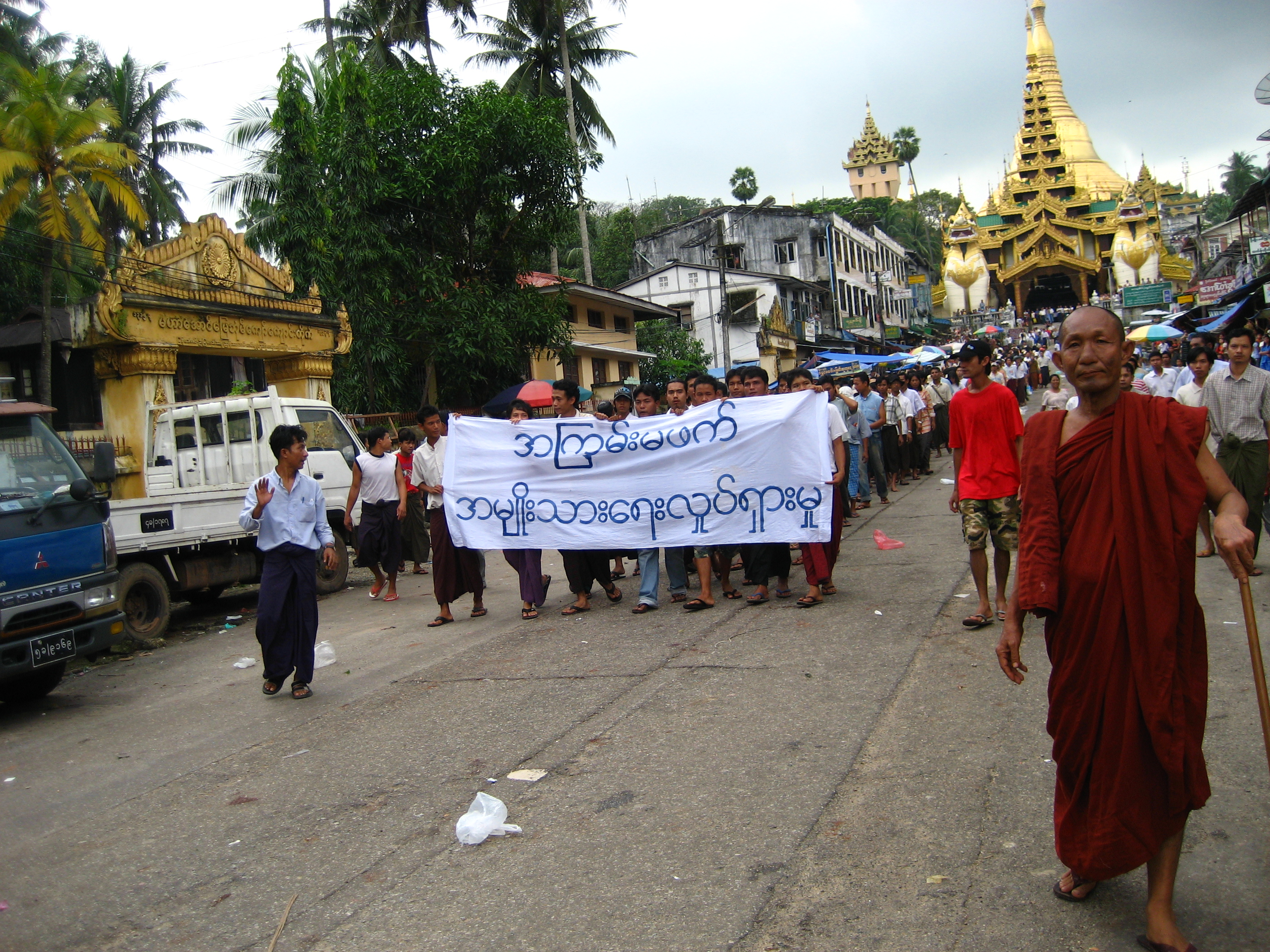
Protesters in Yangon with a banner that reads "non-violence: national movement" in Burmese. In the background is Shwedagon Pagoda.

The 2007 Burmese anti-government protests were a series of anti-government protests that started in Burma on 15 August 2007. The immediate cause of the protests was mainly the unannounced decision of the ruling junta, the State Peace and Development Council, to remove fuel subsidies, which caused the price of diesel and petrol to suddenly rise as much as 100%, and the price of compressed natural gas for buses to increase fivefold in less than a week. The protest demonstrations were at first dealt with quickly and harshly by the junta, with dozens of protesters arrested and detained. Starting 18 September, the protests had been led by thousands of Buddhist monks, and those protests had been allowed to proceed until a renewed government crackdown on 26 September.

During the crackdown, there were rumours of disagreement within the Burmese military, but none were confirmed. At the time, independent sources reported, through pictures and accounts, 30 to 40 monks and 50 to 70 civilians killed as well as 200 beaten. However, other sources reveal more dramatic figures. In a White House statement President Bush said: "Monks have been beaten and killed ... Thousands of pro-democracy protesters have been arrested". Some news reports referred to the protests as the Saffron Revolution.

On 7 February 2008, SPDC announced that a referendum for the Constitution would be held, and Elections by 2010. The 2008 Burmese constitutional referendum was held on 10 May and promised a "discipline-flourishing democracy" for the country in the future.

=== Cyclone Nargis ===
On 3 May 2008, Cyclone Nargis devastated the country when winds of up to 215 km/h (135 mph) touched land in the densely populated, rice-farming delta of the Irrawaddy Division. It is estimated that more than 130,000 people died or went missing and damage totalled 10 billion US dollars; it was the worst natural disaster in Burmese history. The World Food Programme reported that, "Some villages have been almost totally eradicated, and vast rice-growing areas are wiped out."

The United Nations estimated that as many as 1 million were left homeless, and the World Health Organization "received reports of malaria outbreaks in the worst-affected area." Yet in the critical days following this disaster, Burma's isolationist regime complicated recovery efforts by delaying the entry of United Nations planes delivering medicine, food, and other supplies. The government's failure to permit entry for large-scale international relief efforts was described by the United Nations as "unprecedented."

=== 2011–2016 ===
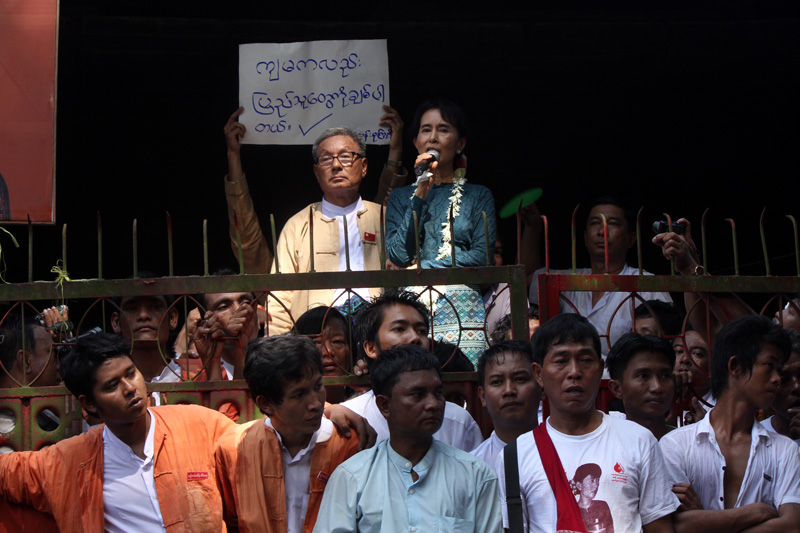
Aung San Suu Kyi addresses crowds at the NLD headquarters shortly after her release.

The 2011–2012 Burmese democratic reforms were an ongoing series of political, economic and administrative changes in Burma undertaken by the military-backed government. These reforms included the release of pro-democracy leader Aung San Suu Kyi from house arrest and subsequent dialogues with her, establishment of the National Human Rights Commission, general amnesties of more than 200 political prisoners, institution of new labour laws that allow labour unions and strikes, relaxation of press censorship, and regulations of currency practices.

As a consequence of the reforms, ASEAN approved Burma's bid for the chairmanship in 2014. United States Secretary of State Hillary Clinton visited Burma on 1 December 2011, to encourage further progress; it was the first visit by a US Secretary of State in more than fifty years. United States President Barack Obama visited one year later, becoming the first US president to visit the country.

Suu Kyi's party, the National League for Democracy, participated in by-elections held on 1 April 2012 after the government abolished laws that led to the NLD's boycott of the 2010 general election. She led the NLD in winning the by-elections in a landslide, winning 41 out of 44 of the contested seats, with Suu Kyi herself winning a seat representing Kawhmu Constituency in the lower house of the Burmese Parliament.

2015 election results gave the National League for Democracy an absolute majority of seats in both chambers of the Burmese parliament, enough to ensure that its candidate would become president, while NLD leader Aung San Suu Kyi is constitutionally barred from the presidency. However, clashes between Burmese troops and local insurgent groups continued.

=== 2016–2021 ===
The new parliament convened on 1 February 2016 and, on 15 March 2016, Htin Kyaw was elected as the first non-military president of the country since the 1962 coup d'état. Aung San Suu Kyi assumed the newly created role of the State Counsellor, a position similar to Prime Minister, on 6 April 2016.

The resounding victory of Aung San Suu Kyi's National League for Democracy in 2015 general elections raised hope for a successful transition of Myanmar from a closely held military rule to a free democratic system. However, internal political turmoil, crumbling economy and ethnic strife continued to make the transition to democracy a painful one. The 2017 murder of Ko Ni, a prominent Muslim lawyer and a key member of Myanmar's governing National League for Democracy party is seen as a serious blow to the country's fragile democracy. Mr. Ko Ni's murder deprived Aung San Suu Kyi of his perspective as an adviser, particularly on reforming Myanmar's military-drafted Constitution and ushering the country to democracy.

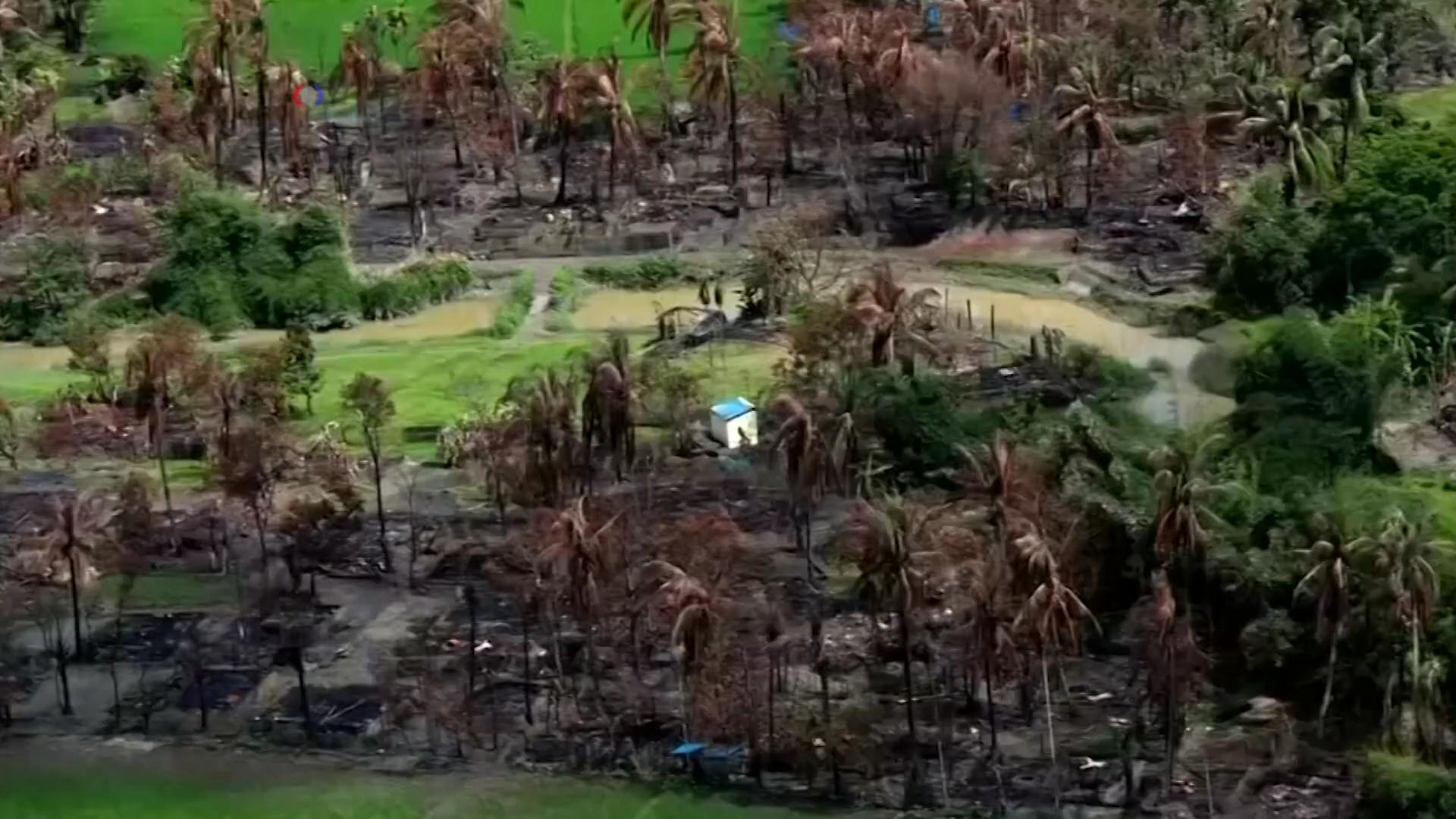
Aerial view of a burned Rohingya village in Rakhine state, September 2017

There was a military crackdown against Rohingya that occurred from October 2016 to January 2017, and the second has been occurring since August 2017. The crisis forced over a million Rohingya to flee to other countries. Most fled to Bangladesh, resulting in the creation of Kutupalong refugee camp, the world's largest refugee camp.

At the general election on 8 November 2020, the National League for Democracy (NLD) won 396 out of 476 seats in parliament, an even larger margin of victory than in the 2015 election. The military's proxy party, the Union Solidarity and Development Party, won only 33 seats.

=== 2021–present ===
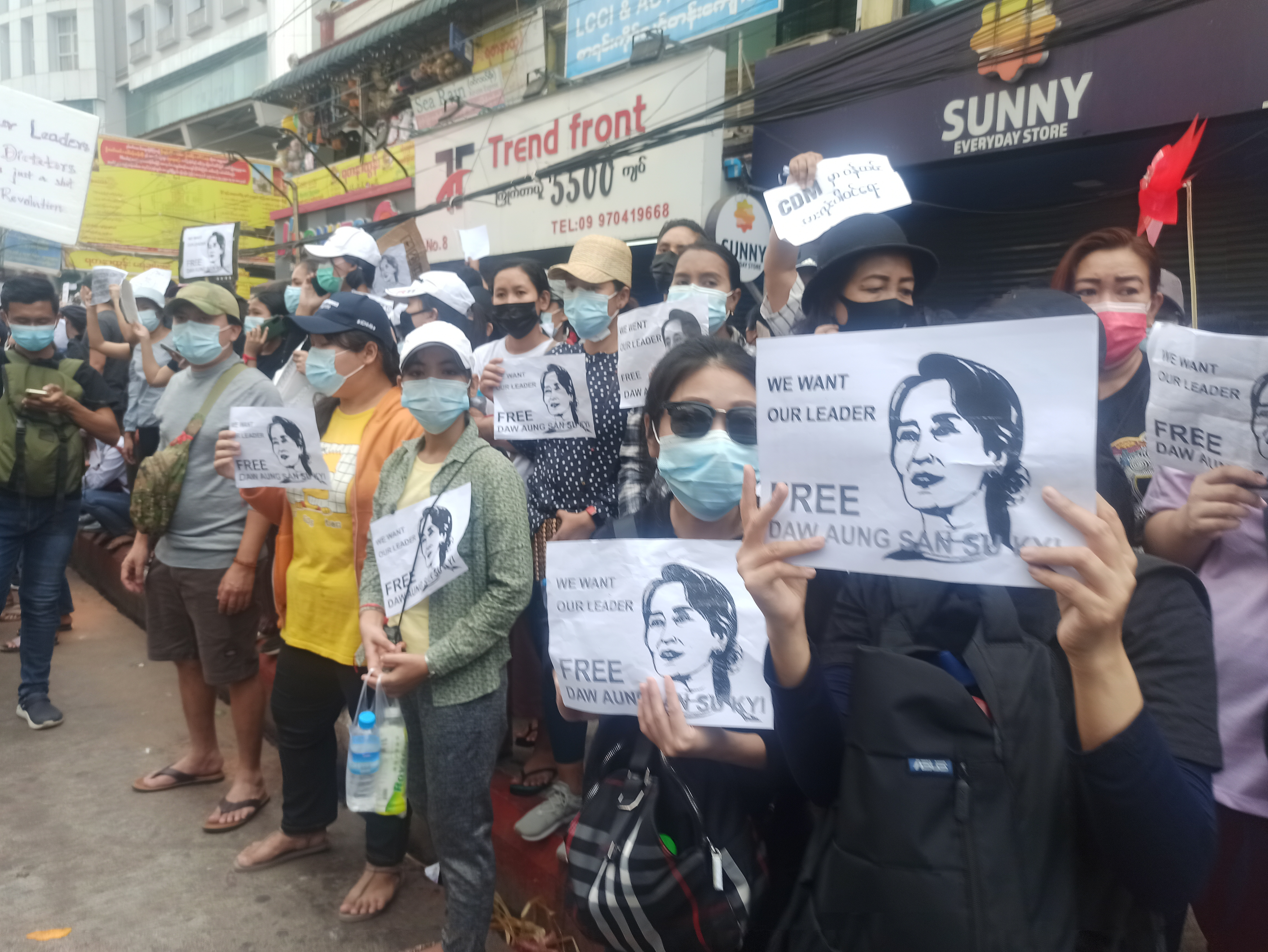
Protesters in Yangon carrying signs reading "Free Daw Aung San Suu Kyi" on 8 February 2021

On 1 February 2021, Myanmar's military, the Tatmadaw, detained the state counsellor Aung San Suu Kyi and other government members. The military handed power to the military chief Min Aung Hlaing and a state of emergency was declared for one year.

Military situation in Myanmar as of 2024. Areas controlled by the Tatmadaw are highlighted in red.

On 2 February 2021, healthcare workers and civil servants across the country, including in the national capital, Naypyidaw, launched a national civil disobedience movement (အာဏာဖီဆန်ရေးလှုပ်ရှားမှု), in opposition to the coup d'état. Protesters have employed peaceful and nonviolent forms of protest, which include acts of civil disobedience, labour strikes, a military boycott campaign, a pot-banging movement, a red ribbon campaign, public protests, and formal recognition of the election results by elected representatives.

On 20 February, two people were shot dead, and at least two dozen more were injured in Mandalay by the military in a violent crackdown. These people were residents of Maha Aung Myay Township guarding government shipyard workers involved in the civil disobedience movement from the police who were forcing them back to work. In addition to firing live rounds, the police and military personnel also beat, arrested, used water cannon, and threw various objects such as marbles and stones at civilians.

As of 26 March 2021, at least 3,070 people have been detained, and at least 423 protesters have been killed by military or police forces.

Armed insurgencies by the People's Defence Force of the National Unity Government have erupted throughout Myanmar. In many villages and towns, junta forces' attacks drove out tens of thousands of people at least. UNOCHA said that as of early September 2022, 974,000 people had been internally displaced since the coup. In addition, between the February 2021 coup and June 2022, over 40,000 people fled into neighboring countries, including many from communities close to the borders that came under regime attacks.

== See also ==
- History of Asia
- List of Burmese monarchs
  - Burmese monarchs' family tree
- List of presidents of Burma
- Politics of Burma
- Prime Minister of Burma
- Timeline of Burmese history

== References and further reading ==
- Aung-Thwin, Michael, and Maitrii Aung-Thwin. A history of Myanmar since ancient times: Traditions and transformations (Reaktion Books, 2013) online.
- Aung-Thwin, Michael A. (2005). The Mists of Rāmañña: The Legend that was Lower Burma (illustrated ed.). Honolulu: University of Hawaiʻi Press. ISBN 0-8248-2886-0.
- Brown, Ian. Burma's Economy in the Twentieth Century (Cambridge University Press, 2013) 229 pp. online review at http://eh.net/book-reviews
- Callahan, Mary (2003). Making Enemies: War and State Building in Burma. Ithaca: Cornell University Press.
- Cameron, Ewan. "The State of Myanmar," History Today (May 2020), 70#4 pp 90–93.
- Charney, Michael W. (2009). A History of Modern Burma. Cambridge University Press. ISBN 978-0-521-61758-1.
- Charney, Michael W. (2006). Powerful Learning: Buddhist Literati and the Throne in Burma's Last Dynasty, 1752–1885. Ann Arbor: University of Michigan.
- Cooler, Richard M. (2002). "The Art and Culture of Burma". Northern Illinois University.
- Dai, Yingcong (2004). "A Disguised Defeat: The Myanmar Campaign of the Qing Dynasty". Modern Asian Studies. 38. Cambridge University Press: 145–189. doi:10.1017/s0026749x04001040. S2CID 145784397.
- Fernquest, Jon (Autumn 2005). "Min-gyi-nyo, the Shan Invasions of Ava (1524–27), and the Beginnings of Expansionary Warfare in Toungoo Burma: 1486–1539". SOAS Bulletin of Burma Research. 3 (2). ISSN 1479-8484.
- Hall, D. G. E. (1960). Burma (3rd ed.). Hutchinson University Library. ISBN 978-1-4067-3503-1.
- Harvey, G. E. (1925). History of Burma: From the Earliest Times to 10 March 1824. London: Frank Cass & Co. Ltd.
- Htin Aung, Maung (1967). A History of Burma. New York and London: Cambridge University Press. online free to borrow
- Hudson, Bob (March 2005), "A Pyu Homeland in the Samon Valley: a new theory of the origins of Myanmar's early urban system" (PDF), Myanmar Historical Commission Golden Jubilee International Conference, archived from the original (PDF) on 26 November 2013
- Kipgen, Nehginpao. Myanmar: A political history (Oxford University Press, 2016) online.
- Kyaw Thet (1962). History of Burma (in Burmese). Yangon: Yangon University Press.
- Lieberman, Victor B. (2003). Strange Parallels: Southeast Asia in Global Context, c. 800–1830, volume 1, Integration on the Mainland. Cambridge University Press. ISBN 978-0-521-80496-7.
- Luce, G. H.; et al. (1939). "Burma through the fall of Pagan: an outline, part 1" (PDF). Journal of the Burma Research Society. 29: 264–282. Archived from the original (PDF) on 24 January 2024.
- Mahmood, Syed S., et al. "The Rohingya people of Myanmar: health, human rights, and identity." The Lancet 389.10081 (2017): 1841–1850. online
- Mark, Karl (1853). War in Burma—The Russian Question—Curious Diplomatic Correspondence. Vol. 12. Clemens Dutt (trans.) (1979 ed.). New York: International Publishers.
- Moore, Elizabeth H. (2007). Early Landscapes of Myanmar. Bangkok: River Books. ISBN 978-974-9863-31-2.
- Myint-U, Thant (2001). The Making of Modern Burma. Cambridge University Press. ISBN 0-521-79914-7.
- Myint-U, Thant (2006). The River of Lost Footsteps—Histories of Burma. Farrar, Straus and Giroux. ISBN 978-0-374-16342-6.
- Phayre, Lt. Gen. Sir Arthur P. (1883). History of Burma (1967 ed.). London: Susil Gupta.
- Seekins, Donald M. Historical Dictionary of Burma (Myanmar) (Rowman & Littlefield, 2017).
- Selth, Andrew (2012). Burma (Myanmar) Since the 1988 Uprising: A Select Bibliography. Australia: Griffith University.
- Smith, Martin John (1991). Burma: insurgency and the politics of ethnicity (Illustrated ed.). Zed Books. ISBN 0-86232-868-3.
- Steinberg, David I. (2009). Burma/Myanmar: what everyone needs to know. Oxford University Press. ISBN 978-0-19-539068-1.
- Topich, William J., and Keith A. Leitich. The history of Myanmar (ABC-CLIO, 2013). online
- Wyatt, David K. (2003). Thailand: A Short History (2 ed.). Yale University Press. p. 125. ISBN 978-0-300-08475-7.

=== Historiography ===
- Englehart, Neil A. "Liberal Leviathan or Imperial Outpost? J. S. Furnivall on Colonial Rule in Burma", Modern Asian Studies (2011) 45#4 pp 759–790.
