= Hopong State =

Former Shan state in Myanmar

Coordinates: 20°47′52″N 97°10′34″E

Hopong (Burmese: Hopon) was a Shan state in the Central Division of the Southern Shan States in what is today Burma.
